= List of rijksmonuments in Friesland =

This is a list of rijksmonuments in Friesland that have articles on the English language Wikipedia.

== A ==
Rijksmonument	Type	Location	Description	Photo
De Achlumer Molen	Windmill	Achlum	A smock mill built in 1851, restored to working order.	
Mellemolen	Windmill	Akkrum	A hollow post mill rebuilt in 2004, restored to working order.	
De Ouderkerkermolen	Windmill	Aldtsjerk	A smock mill built in 1864, restored to working order.	
Sint-Pauluskerk	Church	Aldtsjerk		
Bornrif	Lighthouse	Ameland	A lighthouse built in 1880.	
De Eendracht	Windmill	Anjum	A smock mill built in 1889, restored to working order.	
Sint-Augustinuskerk	Church	Augustinusga		

== B ==
Rijksmonument	Type	Location	Description	Photo
Sint-Mariakerk	Church	Bears	A church dating from the 13th century	
Sint-Martinuskerk	Church	Boazum		
De Klaver	Windmill	Bolsward	A hollow post mill built in 1802, restored to working order.	
Lonjé Molen	Windmill	Bolsward	A smock mill built in 1824, restored to working order.	
Sint-Martinuskerk	Church	Bolsward		
De Broekmolen	Windmill	Broeksterwoude	A smock mill built in 1876, restored to working order.	
De Grote Molen	Windmill	Broeksterwoude	A smock mill built in 1887, restored to working order.	
De Mûnts	Windmill	Buitenpost	A smock mill built in 1959, restored to working order.	
Protestant church of Buitenpost	Church	Buitenpost		
De Olifant	Windmill	Burdaard	A smock mill built in 1867, restored to working order.	
De Zwaluw	Windmill	Burdaard	A smock mill built in 1987, working commercially.	
Sint-Martinuskerk	Church	Burgum	Oldest part built c. 1100	
Aylvapoldermolen	Windmill	Burgwerd	A windmill originally built at Hallum in 1846, moved to Burgwerd in 2000 and restored to working order.	
De Hiemerter Mole	Windmill	Burgwerd	A hollow post mill built in 1811, restored to working order.	
Windlust	Windmill	Burum	A smock mill built in 1787 that burnt down in 2012. The new-build replacement is not listed as a Rijksmonument.	

== C ==
Rijksmonument	Type	Location	Description	Photo
De Cornwerdermolen	Windmill	Cornwerd	A smock mill built in 1907, restored to working order.	

== D ==
Rijksmonument	Type	Location	Description	Photo
Sint-Bonifatiuskerk	Church	Damwâld		
Sint-Benedictuskerk	Church	Damwâld		
Sint-Nicolaaskerk	Church	Dearsum		
De Mars	Windmill	De Blesse	A smock mill built in 1997. In working order.	
Sint-Johannes de Doperkerk	Church	Deinum		
De Hoop	Windmill	Dokkum	A smock mill built in 1849, restored to working order.	
De Marmeerin	Windmill	Dokkum	A smock mill built in 1968. Dismantled in 2014 pending restoration on a new site.	
Zeldenrust	Windmill	Dokkum	A smock mill built in 1862. Restored to working order.	
Sint-Nicolaaskerk	Church	Drogeham		
De Hatsumermolen	Windmill	Dronrijp	A smock mill built in 1878, restored to working order.	
De Poelen	Windmill	Dronrijp	A smock mill built in 1850, restored to working order.	
Kingmatille	Windmill	Dronrijp	A smock mill built in 1850 and moved in 1985. Restored to working order.	

== E ==
Rijksmonument	Type	Location	Description	Photo
De Princehofmolen	Windmill	Earnewâld	A hollow post mill built in 1958, maintained as a landmark.	
Rispenserpoldermolen	Windmill	Easterein	A smock mill rebuilt in 1994, restored to working order.	
Alde Swarte Molen	Windmill	Easterlittens	A hollow post mill built in the 17th century that has been restored.	
Former Protestant church of Eastermar	Church	Eastermar	A church with a 13th-century tower.	
Vesuvius	Tjasker	Elsloo	A tjasker built in the 19th century, restored to working order.	
De Gans	Windmill	Ezumazijl	A smock mill built in 1850, restored to working order.	

== F ==
Rijksmonument	Type	Location	Description	Photo
Skierstins	Fortified house	Feanwâlden	Stienhús built c. 1300	
Slagdijkstermolen	Windmill	Finkum	A smock mill built in 1864, restored to working order.	
Koffiemolen, Formerum	Windmill	Formerum	A smock mill built in 1876, restored to working order.	
Arkens	Windmill	Franeker	A hollow post mill built in 1835 and moved in 1972. Restored to working order.	
Eisinga Planetarium	Orrery	Franeker	An orrery, a working model of the Solar System.	
Franeker City Hall	City Hall	Franeker	A municipal building erected in 1594.	

== G ==
Rijksmonument	Type	Location	Description	Photo
De Jansmolen	Windmill	Goëngahuizen	A hollow post mill built in the 18th century, restored as a landscape feature.	
De Modderige Bol	Windmill	Goëngahuizen	a hollow post mill built in the mid-19th century, restored to working order.	
Heechheim	Windmill	Goëngahuizen	A hollow post mill built in the 18th century, restored to working order.	
Roekmolen	Windmill	Goëngahuizen	A hollow post mill built at Aldeboarn in the 19th century. Moved to Goëngahuizen in 2009 and restored to working order.	
Kramersmolen	Windmill	Goutum	A hollow post mill built in 2002, maintained in full working order and held in reserve.	
Molen Hoogland	Windmill	Goutum	A hollow post mill rebuilt in 2004, restored to working order	
Sint-Agneskerk	Church	Goutum		
De Bird	Windmill	Grou	A hollow post mill built in the 18th century, restored so that it can turn by wind.	
De Borgmolen	Windmill	Grou	A smock mill built in 2008, restored so that it can turn by wind.	
De Haensmolen	Windmill	Grou	A hollow post mill rebuilt in 2007, restored as a landscape feature.	
Sint-Pieterkerk	Church	Grou		
Sint-Martinuskerk	Church	Gytsjerk	A late 12th-century Romanesque church with a 19th-century facade.	

== H ==
Rijksmonument	Type	Location	Description	Photo
Genezareth	Windmill	Hallum	A smock mill built in 1850, restored to full working order and held in reserve.	
De Hantumermolen	Windmill	Hantum	A smock mill built in 1880, restored to working order	
Sint-Annakerk	Church	Hantumhuizen		
De Oegekloostermolen	Windmill	Hartwerd	A hollow post mill built in the early 19th century, restored to working order and held in reserve.	
Welgelegen	Windmill	Heerenveen	A smock mill built in 1849, restored to working order.	
De Hogebeintumermolen	Windmill	Hogebeintum	A smock mill built in 1860. Restored to working order and held in reserve.	
De Hoop	Windmill	Holwerd	A smock mill built in 1849, restored and working for trade.	
Miedenmolen	Windmill	Holwerd	A smock mill built in 1855, maintained in full working order and held in reserve.	
De Huinsermolen	Windmill	Húns	A smock mill built in 1829, restored to working order	

== I ==
Rijksmonument	Type	Location	Description	Photo
De Edensermolen	Windmill	Iens	A smock mill built in 1847, restored to working order and held in reserve.	
De Rat	Windmill	IJlst	A smock mill built in 1828, working for trade	
Terpensmole	Windmill	IJlst	A hollow post mill built in 2011.	

== J ==
Rijksmonument	Type	Location	Description	Photo
De Volharding	Windmill	Jislum	A smock mill built in 1872, restored to working order and held in reserve.	
Sint-Petruskerk	Church	Jistrum	A 13th-century Romanesque church	
Sint-Radboudkerk	Church	Jorwert		
De Groene Molen	Windmill	Joure	A hollow post mill built c. 1800, restored so that it can turn by wind.	
Penninga's Molen	Windmill	Joure	A smock mill built in 1900. Restored to working order and used as a training mill.	

== K ==
Rijksmonument	Type	Location	Description	Photo
De Eendracht	Windmill	Kimswerd	A smock mill built in 1872, restored to working order and held in reserve.	
Tochmaland	Windmill	Kollum	A smock mill built in 1893, restored to working order.	
De Westermolen	Windmill	Kollumerpomp	A smock mill built in 1845, restored to working order.	
De Vlijt	Windmill	Koudum	A hollow post mill built in 1986 and in working order.	

== L ==
Rijksmonument	Type	Location	Description	Photo
De Sweachmermolen	Windmill	Langweer	A smock mill built in 1782, restored to working order and held in reserve.	
Froskepôlemolen	Windmill	Leeuwarden	A smock mill built in 1962, restored to working order.	
Oldehove	Church	Leeuwarden	A leaning unfinished church tower.	
Sint-Bonifatiuskerk	Church	Leeuwarden	A Gothic Revival church built in 1884	
De Bullemolen	Windmill	Lekkum	A smock mill built in 1825, restored to working order and held in reserve.	
Meerswal	Windmill	Lollum	A smock mill built in 1903, maintained in full working order and held in reserve.	

== M ==
Rijksmonument	Type	Location	Description	Photo
De Weyert	Windmill	Makkinga	A smock mill restored to working order.	
De Grote Molen	Windmill	Marrum	A smock mill built in 1845, restored to working order.	
De Kleilânsmole	[Windmill	Marrum	A smock mill built in 1865. Dismantled in 2010 in preparation for rebuild at Ferwerd.	
De Phenix	Windmill	Marrum	A smock mill built in 1917, restored to working order and used as a training mill.	
De Marssumermolen	Windmill	Marssum	A smock mill built in 1903. Restored to working order and used as a training mill.	
Poptaslot	Stins	Marssum	A house built in the early 16th century, now a museum.	
Terpzigt	Windmill	Marssum	A hollow post mill built in 1888, restored to working order.	
De Rotpa	Windmill	Metslawier	A smock mill built in 1840. Restored to working order.	

== N ==
Rijksmonument	Type	Location	Description	Photo
De Phenix	Windmill	Nes	A smock mill built in 1880. Restored to working order.	
't Zwaantje	Windmill	Nijemirdum	A smock mill built in 1878. Restored to working order.	
De Reiger	Windmill	Nijetrijne	A smock mill built in 1871. Converted to a holiday home.	
De Rietvink	Windmill	Nijetrijne	A smock mill built in 1855. Formerly a holiday home, but now restored to working order.	
Monnikenburenmolen	Windmill	Nijhuizum	A hollow post mill built in the early 18th century, restored to working order	
Windlust	Windmill	Noordwolde	A smock mill built in 1860 that has been restored to working order.	

== O ==
Rijksmonument	Type	Location	Description	Photo
Sint-Mariakerk	Church	Oentsjerk	A church dating from the 14th century	
De Geeuwpoldermolen	Windmill	Oppenhuizen	A hollow post mill built in the early 19th century, restored to working order.	
Sint-Agneskerk	Church	Oudega, Smallingerland		
Doris Mooltje	Windmill	Oudega, Súdwest-Fryslân	A hollow post mill built in the 18th century. Restored to working order.	
De Balkendsterpoldermolen	Windmill	Oude Leije	A smock mill built in 1844, restored to working order. and held in reserve.	

== P ==
Rijksmonument	Type	Location	Description	Photo
De Hond	Windmill	Paesens	A smock mill built in 1861, restored to working order.	

== R ==
Rijksmonument	Type	Location	Description	Photo
De Klaarkampstermeermolen	Windmill	Rinsumageest	A smock mill built in 1893, restored to working order.	
Sint-Alexanderkerk	Church	Rinsumageest		
De Hoop	Windmill	Roodkerk	A smock mill built in 1911, restored to working order.	
Ypey Mole	Windmill	Ryptsjerk	A smock mill built in 1981 that has been restored to working order.	

== S ==
Rijksmonument	Type	Location	Description	Photo
De Schalsumermolen	Windmill	Schalsum	A smock mill built in 1801, restored to working order and used as a training mill.	
De Skarrenmolen	Windmill	Scharsterbrug	A smock mill built in 1888, restored to working order.	
North Tower	Lighthouse	Schiermonnikoog	A lighthouse erected in 1854.	
De Korenaar	Windmill	Sexbierum	A smock mill built in 1868. In working order.	
De Hersteller	Windmill	Sintjohannesga	A smock mill built in 1857, converted to residential use.	
De Kaai	Windmill	Sleat	A smock mill built in 1755. In working order.	
Waterpoort	Water gate	Sneek	A gate in a defensive wall that connects a city to a waterway.	
Stavoren Lighthouse	Lighthouse	Stavoren	A lighthouse built in 1885.	
De Kleine Molen	Windmill	Stiens	A smock mill built in 1913. In working order.	
De Steenhuistermolen	Windmill	Stiens	A smock mill built in 1880. In working order and held in reserve.	
De Hoop	Windmill	Sumar	A smock mill built in 1882. In working order.	
Koartwâld	Windmill	Surhuisterveen	A smock mill built in 1864. restored to working order.	
Sint-Nicolaaskerk	Church	Swichum		

== T ==
Rijksmonument	Type	Location	Description	Photo
Brandaris	Lighthouse	Terschelling	A lighthouse built in 1593.	
Boezemmolen	Windmill	Tijnje	A smock mill built in 1856, under restoration.	
De Babuurstermolen	Windmill	Tjerkwerd	A smock mill built in 1882. In working order and held in reserve.	
Sint-Petruskerk	Church	Twijzel		
De Himriksmole	Windmill	Tytsjerk	A hollow post mill built c. 1860, restored to working order.	
De Lytse Geast	Windmill	Tytsjerk	A smock mill built in 1900, converted to a holiday cottage.	
Fatum	Windmill	Tzum	A hollow post mill built in the 18th century. Restored to working order.	
Teetlum	Windmill	Tzum	A hollow post mill built c. 1800, restored to working order.	

== V ==
Rijksmonument	Type	Location	Description	Photo
De Deels	Windmill	Vegelinsoord	A windmill built in 1859, restored to working order.	
Vuurduin	Lighthouse	Vlieland	A lighthouse built in 1909.	
De Vrouwbuurstermolen	Windmill	Vrouwenparochie	A windmill built in 1862, restored to working order.	

== W ==
Rijksmonument	Type	Location	Description	Photo
Victor	Windmill	Wanswerd	A smock mill built in 1867, restored to working order.	
De Ikkers	Windmill	Wartena	A hollow post mill built in 1970, restored so that it can turn in the wind.	
De Hempenserpoldermolen	Windmill	Wergea	A smock mill built in 1863, restored to working order.	
De Beintemapoldermolen	Windmill	Westergeest	A smock mill built in 1870, restored to working order.	
't Behouden Huys	House	West-Terschelling	Two houses once belonging to whalers	
Langwert	Windmill	Winsum	A smock mill built in 1979, under restoration.	
De Onderneming	Windmill	Witmarsum	A smock mill built in 1850. Restored to working order and used as a training mill.	
De Pankoekstermolen	Windmill	Witmarsum	A smock mill built in 1900. Restored to working order and held in reserve.	
De Gooyer	Windmill	Wolvega	A smock mill built in 1917. Restored to working order.	
Windlust	Windmill	Wolvega	A smock mill built in 1888. Restored to working order.	
De Nijlânnermolen	Windmill	Workum	A smock mill built in 11785. Restored to working order and held in reserve.	
De Snip	Windmill	Workum	A smock mill built in 1888. Restored to working order.	
De Jager	Windmill	Woudsend	A smock mill built in 1719. Restored to working order.	
't Lam	Windmill	Woudsend	A smock mill built in the late 17th century. Restored to working order.	
Sint-Vituskerk	Church	Wyns	A 13th-century church	
Wijnsermolen	Windmill	Wyns	A smock mill built in 1871, restored to working order.	
