= Fatum =

Fatum may refer to:

- Fatum (1915 film), a Dutch silent drama film
- Fatum (2023 film), a Spanish-French thriller film
- Fatum (mythology), Roman equivalent of the ancient Greek deity Moros, the spirit of impending doom
- Fatum (Tchaikovsky), a symphonic poem by Pyotr Ilyich Tchaikovsky
- Fatum, Friesland, a hamlet in Friesland, Netherlands
- Fatum, Tzum, a windmill near the hamlet of Fatum
- David Fatum (born 1968), Canadian-American darts player
