= De Kampen, Friesland =

De Kampen
- Hamlet
- Location in the province of Friesland in the Netherlands De Kampen (Netherlands)
- Coordinates: 53.15116°N 5.57105°E
- Country: Netherlands
- Province: Friesland
- Municipality: Waadhoeke
- Village: Tzum
- Elevation: 0.3 m (0.98 ft)
- Time zone: UTC+1 (CET)
  - Summer (DST): UTC+2 (CEST)
- Postcode: 8804
- Area code: 0517

De Kampen (Dutch pronunciation: [də ˈkɑmpə(n)]) is a hamlet in the Dutch municipality of Waadhoeke in the province of Friesland.

It is located north of Fatum and southeast of Tzum, of which it is a part administratively. The settlement of the hamlet is located on the Wommelserweg, near the intersection with the Slotwei of the hamlet of Koum.

De Kampen is a hamlet located on a terp. In 1433 it was mentioned as Op dae Campen and in 1640 and 1664 as De Campen, a name that would indicate pieces of land or fields that were separated. It then consisted of one farm that bore this name, which is still the name of a distillery in the hamlet. Three other farms were added in the 19th century.
