= Monnikenburenmolen, Nijhuizum =

Windmill in Nijhuizum, Netherlands

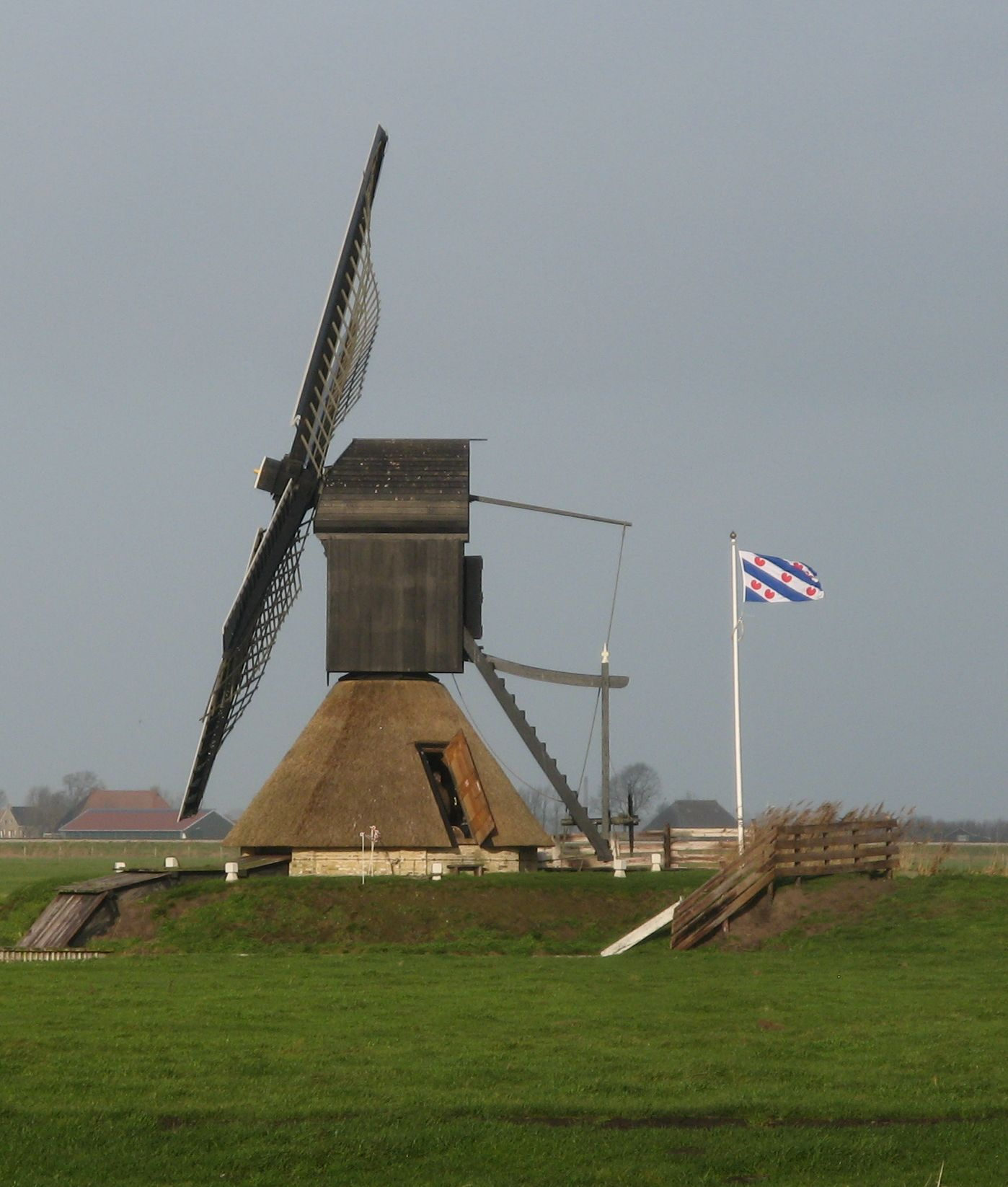
- Spinnenkop in 2011
- Interactive map of Monnikenburenmolen, Nijhuizum

Origin
- Mill name: Monnikenburenmolen of Nijhuizumermolen
- Mill location: Near Nijhuizum 17, 8775 XD Nijhuizum
- Coordinates: 52°59′10″N 5°29′22″E
- Operator: Molenstichting Nijefurd
- Year built: before 1832, restored 2008

Information
- Purpose: Drainage mill
- Type: Hollow post
- Roundhouse storeys: Single storey roundhouse
- No. of sails: Four sails
- Type of sails: Common sails
- Windshaft: Wood
- Winding: Tailpole and winch
- Type of pump: Archimedes' screw

The Monnikenburenmolen or Nijhuizumermolen is a drainage mill in Nijhuizum, Friesland, Netherlands. It was restored in 2008 after it was only just saved from demolishment in 1994. It is a hollow post windmill of a type called "spinnenkop" by the Dutch. The mill is listed as a Rijksmonument, number 527646. It can help drain the polder and has been designated as a backup to the pumping station by the waterboard Wetterskip Fryslân.

== History ==
A mill was situated in this location in 1832. Originally it was equipped with a scoop wheel outside the mill. Later this was replaced by an Archimedes' screw. Before 1940 the mill body was removed and the screw was powered by a diesel engine placed in the substructure, which was replaced by an electric motor some time before 1970. In 1994 the remnants of the mill would have been demolished if mill enthusiasts had not prevented it. Molenstichting Nijefurd became owner of the mill in 2003. It was restored to working order in 2008.

== Description ==
The Monnikenburenmolen or Nijhuizumermolen is what the Dutch describe as a "spinnenkop" (English: spiderhead mill). It is a small hollow post mill winded by a winch. The four common sails have a span of 13.60 metres (44 ft 7 in) and are carried on a wooden windshaft. The brake wheel on the windshaft drives the wallower at the top of the upright shaft in the weatherboarded body, which passed through the main post into the octagonal, thatched substructure. At the bottom of the upright shaft, the crown wheel drives the Archimedes' screw. The screw is 1 metre (3 ft 3 in) in diameter.

== Public access ==
The mill is open to the public by appointment on Saturday afternoons. It is easily accessible by a footpath leading to the mill from the public road.
