= Rispenserpoldermolen, Easterein =

Smock mill in Friesland, Netherlands

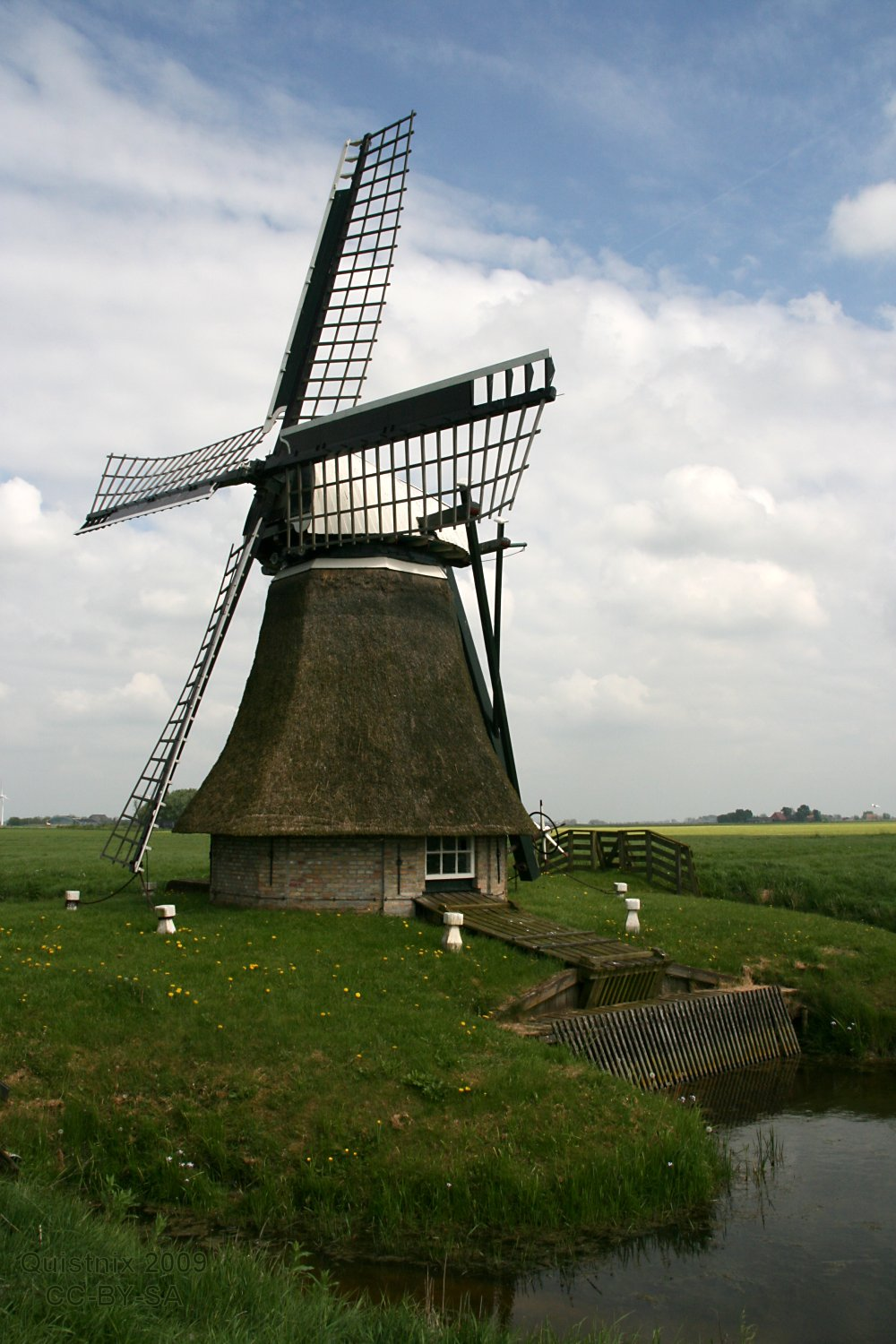
- Rispenserpoldermolen, May 2009
- Interactive map of Rispenserpoldermolen, Easterein

Origin
- Mill name: Rispenserpoldermolen
- Mill location: Trijehuizen, 8737 JL Easterein
- Coordinates: 53°06′21″N 5°36′26″E
- Operator: Gemeente Littenseradiel
- Year built: 1994

Information
- Purpose: Drainage mill
- Type: Smock mill
- Storeys: Two-storey smock
- Base storeys: One-storey base
- Smock sides: Eight sides
- No. of sails: Four sails
- Type of sails: Common sails
- Windshaft: Wood and steel
- Winding: Tailpole and winch
- Type of pump: Archimedes' screw

Rispenserpoldermolen is a smock mill in Easterein, Friesland, Netherlands, which was rebuilt in 1994. The mill is listed as a Rijksmonument, number 21572.

== History ==
Rispenserpoldermolen was built in 1821 by millwright Arjen Gerbens Timmenga of Easterein to drain the Rispenserpolder. It was first set to work on 27 November 1821. It was worked until 1964. In 1966 it was in the ownership of the Gemeente Hennaarderadeel. A restoration of the mill was undertaken in 1968. The mill was dismantled in 1993, and rebuilt at a new site 125 metres (137 yd) to the north in Easterein in 1994. The mill was officially reopened on Nationale Molendag, 1995.

== Description ==
Rispenserpoldermolen is what the Dutch describe as a "grondzeiler". It is a two-storey smock mill on a single-storey base. There is no stage, the sail reaching almost to the ground. The smock is thatched and the cap covered in vertical boards. The mill is winded by tailpole and winch. The sails are Common sails. They have a span of 12.74 metres (41 ft 10 in). The sails are carried on a wood and steel windshaft made by J H Westra of Franeker. The windshaft also carries the brake wheel, which has 38 cogs. This drives the wallower (20 cogs) at the top of the upright shaft. At the bottom of the upright shaft, the crown wheel, which has 33 cogs drives a gearwheel with 29 cogs on the axle of the wooden Archimedes' screw. The axle of the screw is 280 millimetres (11 in) diameter and the screw is 960 millimetres (3 ft 2 in) diameter and 4.95 metres (16 ft 3 in) long. The screw is inclined at 24.6°.

== Public access ==
Rispenserpoldermolen is open to the public by appointment.

== Culture ==
A black board in the mill has a poem by the mill's builder, Arjen Gerbens Timmenga. Author Anton Sipman comments that Timmenga was a better millwright than he was a poet.

Dutch	English
Myn maker zijner geest, door yverzugt gedreven heeft na mij eerst gestigt, dit vaarsjen ook geschreven hy gaf dit vaarsjen hier, als dat getuigenis, ook hoe het voor mij was, tot Nagedachtenis, en dat ik zijn gesticht, op nieuwe fondamente zoodat mijn grond bevat, te voor geen molen kende Doch stonden als voor my, drie moolens in myn Perk noch landerien meer, gebragt tot mijner Werk, Waar aan als dat Ue, door leezen als kunt hooren ik wierde meer belast als met hun drie te voren noch deed ik boven dien, die voor mij gingen malen het doelwit van myn werk, noch verre zeegepralen Maar gij als molenaar! aan wien ik word belast De winden zijn zeer ras! Wel op U zaken past, draagt zorg, als gij myn gang, door mijne vang wilt stuiten om dan niet te ras de vang, te eng te sluiten, aan het Vangen leit er veel, Want ziet met volle reeden om vors te stille staan doet beven mijne leeden spaart ook uw eigen Lijf Te raken myne werken, Want tegen mijnen gang zult gij niet kunnen sterken dees les ontvangt van my, ik maker dezer molen op dat gij onbeducht, niet in dees ramp komt dolen ook Wensch ik dit gebouw, zelfs aan den eigenaar, met Zeegen in gebruik, veel tijden, menig jaar, Ik dank ook voor de gunst, die gij mij deed betoonen en ‘k bid, dat god! zijn heil, als in Uw huis doet wonen dees Wensch ontvangt van mij door hartelijke wegen ik sluite met het Woord, God! schenke zijne Zeegen, Noch dient hier wel geplaatst, te sluiten mede in, ter nagedachtenis dees molen zijn begin, Wel aan dan jaargetal; als mede maand, en dag als men voor de eerste maal dees molen malen zag, staat door gebrek aan plaats ter zijde dit gedicht, Dees molen is gesticht in het jaar 1821 en heeft in volle glans voor de eerste maal doen malen den 27 November van gemelde Jaar. — Arjen Gerbens Timmenga	The spirit of my maker, driven by diligence after first founding me, also wrote this little verse he gave this little verse here, as a proof also how it was for me, as a remembrance and that I have been founded, on new foundations so that my ground contains [me], [which] previously knew no mill Nevertheless stood before me, three mills in my area And no longer farms, brought to my work From which you, through reading as through hearing, [know] I am burdened more, as these three before Nor did I more than those that went grinding before me the object of my work, nor far trophies But you as miller, to whom I will be assigned The winds are very fast. Look after your affairs well be careful, if you want to stop my movement with my brake then not to close the brake too fast, too narrow much is dependent on the brake, for see with full winds to stand unmoving, makes shiver my members prevent also [with] your own body too touch my works because against my movement you will not be able to stand this lesson receive from me, I maker of this mill so that you unfrightened, not enter this disaster Also I wish this building, even to its owner Blessings in its use, many times, many a year I also thank for the goodness, that you had done to me and I pray, that God lets his salvation live in your house this wish receive from me through cordial ways I close with the word, God give his blessing Still should here be placed, too include also in remembrance this mill its start Good to the year number; and also month and day when people for the first time saw this mill grind is because of a shortage of space beside this poem This mill was founded in 1821 and has in full glory for the first time been grinding the 27th of November of the mentioned year. — Arjen Gerbens Timmenga
