= Koartwâld, Surhuisterveen =

Windmill in Surhuisterveen, Netherlands

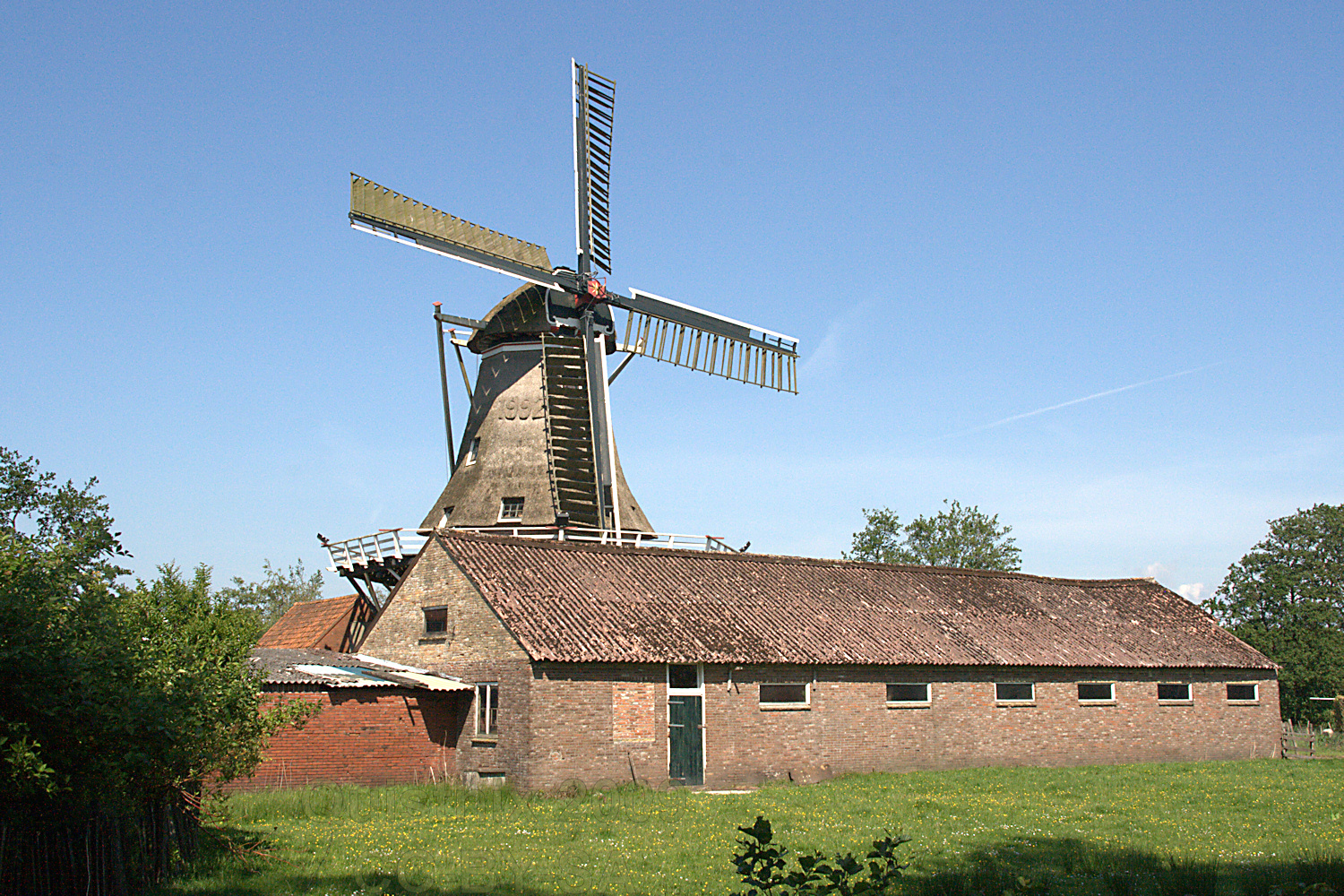
- Koartwâld, May 2009

Origin
- Mill name: Koartwâld; Feanstermoune
- Mill location: Koartwâld 6, 9231 HZ Surhuisterveen
- Coordinates: 53°11′03″N 6°10′57″E
- Operator(s): Stichting De Feanster Moune
- Year built: 1864

Information
- Purpose: Corn mill
- Type: Smock mill
- Storeys: Two storey smock
- Base storeys: Three storey base
- Smock sides: Eight sides
- No. of sails: Four sails
- Type of sails: Patent sails
- Windshaft: Cast iron
- Winding: Tailpole and winch
- Auxiliary power: Diesel engine, formerly petrol engine
- No. of pairs of millstones: Two pairs
- Size of millstones: 1.40 metres (4 ft 7 in)

Koartwâld, or Feanstermoune is a smock mill in Surhuisterveen, Friesland, Netherlands, which was built in 1864 and has been restored to working order. The mill is listed as a Rijksmonument.

== History ==
The previous mill near this site was a post mill. A mill stood here in 1664 and one was marked on a map dated 1718, described as a rye mill. In 1850, a post mill was built on the opposite side of the road to Koartwâld. It burnt down on 4 August 1864.

Koartwâld was built in 1864 for the Van Schepen family. The mill was sold by K B Kloosterman in 1905. It was bought by Hidzer Sietzema, who refurbished the mill. Patent sails were fitted in 1906. These were later fitted with leading edges on the Dekker system. In 1907, a petrol engine was installed to drive the mill when the wind was not blowing. A storm on 24 September 1946 decapitated the mill, damaging the stage, which was then removed.

In 1990, a society was formed with the intention of restoring the mill to working order. The new windshaft came from the Puurveense Molen, Kootwijkerbroek, Gelderland, which had burnt down in 1964. Restoration began in 1991, with the mill officially being opened on National Mills Day, 1995. The mill is listed as a Rijksmonument, No. 511200.

== Description ==
Koartwâld is what the Dutch describe as a "Stellingmolen". It is a smock mill on a brick base. The stage is 6.24 metres (20 ft 6 in) above ground level. The smock and cap are thatched. The mill is winded by tailpole and winch. The sails are Patent sails. They have a span of 18.70 metres (61 ft 4 in). The sails are carried on a cast-iron windshaft, which was cast by the IJzergieterij De Prins van Oranje, The Hague, South Holland in 1889. The windshaft also carries the brake wheel, which has 54 cogs. This drives the wallower (29 cogs) at the top of the upright shaft. At the bottom of the upright shaft is the great spur wheel, which has 74 cogs. The great spur wheel drives a pair of Cullen millstones and a pair of Peak millstones via lantern pinion stone nuts which have 22 staves each. Both pairs of millstones are 1.40 metres (4 ft 7 in) diameter. Auxiliary power is a single-cylinder two-stroke 50 horsepower (37 kW) Brons diesel engine dating from 1933. There is also a three-cylinder McLaren diesel engine dating from 1943.

== Public access ==
Koartwâld is open to the public on Saturdays between 09:00 and 12:00, or by appointment.
