= Gaastmeer =

Gaastmeer De Gaastmar
- Village
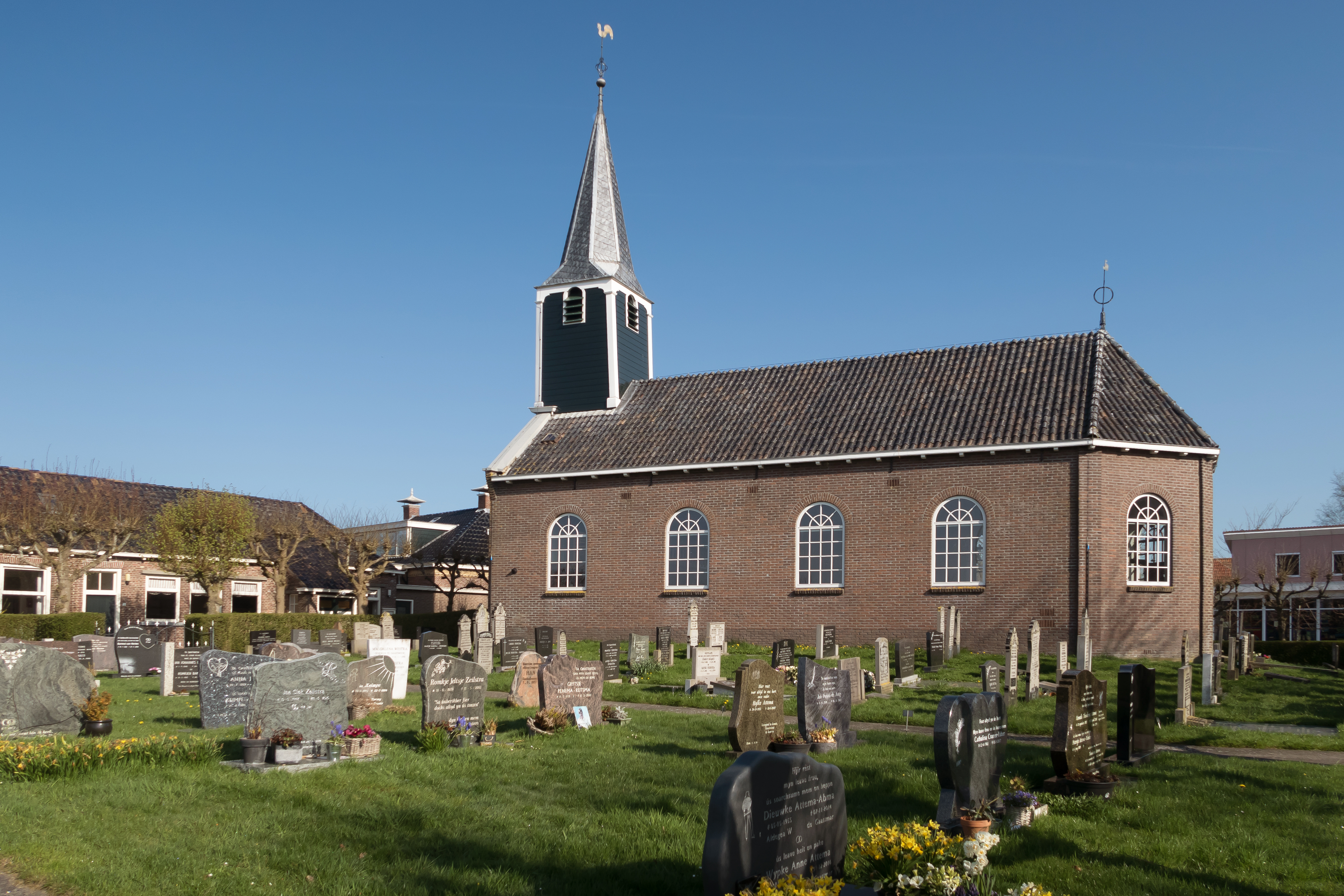
- Gaastmeer, reformed church: de Pieltsjerke

- Flag Coat of arms

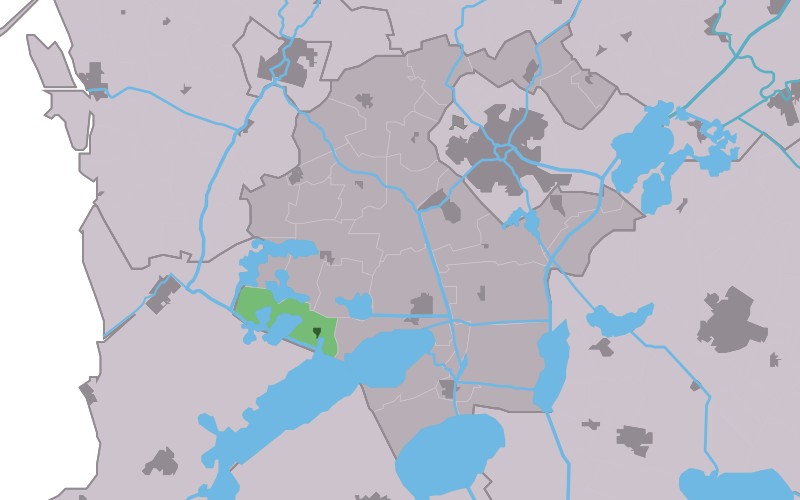
- Location in the former Wymbritseradiel municipality

- Location in the Netherlands Gaastmeer (Netherlands)
- Country: Netherlands
- Province: Friesland
- Municipality: Súdwest-Fryslân

Area
  - Total: 6.69 km^{2} (2.58 sq mi)
- Elevation: −0.4 m (−1.3 ft)

Population (2021)
  - Total: 280
  - Density: 42/km^{2} (110/sq mi)
- Time zone: UTC+1 (CET)
  - Summer (DST): UTC+2 (CEST)
- Postal code: 8611
- Dialing code: 0515

Gaastmeer (West Frisian: De Gaastmar) is a village in Súdwest-Fryslân in the province of Friesland, the Netherlands. It had a population of 295 in January 2017.

== History ==
The village was first mentioned in 1245 as Gersmere, and used to mean "grassland near water", however erroneously evolved into gaast meaning higher land. Gaastmeer was an isolated village between the Fluessen and the Groote Gaastmeer. It was well connected via water, but had no road connections. It used to be a fishing village, and used to specialise in European eel. During the 18th and 19th century, the fishermen of Gaastmeer and neighbouring Heeg used to have their own wharf in London.

Gaastmeer was home to 95 people in 1840. The Protestant Church dates from the 19th century and was rebuilt in 1953. The wooden tower was constructed in 1940. From 1962 onwards, many recreational homes were built in Gaastmeer.

Before 2011, the village was part of the Wymbritseradiel municipality.

== Gallery ==
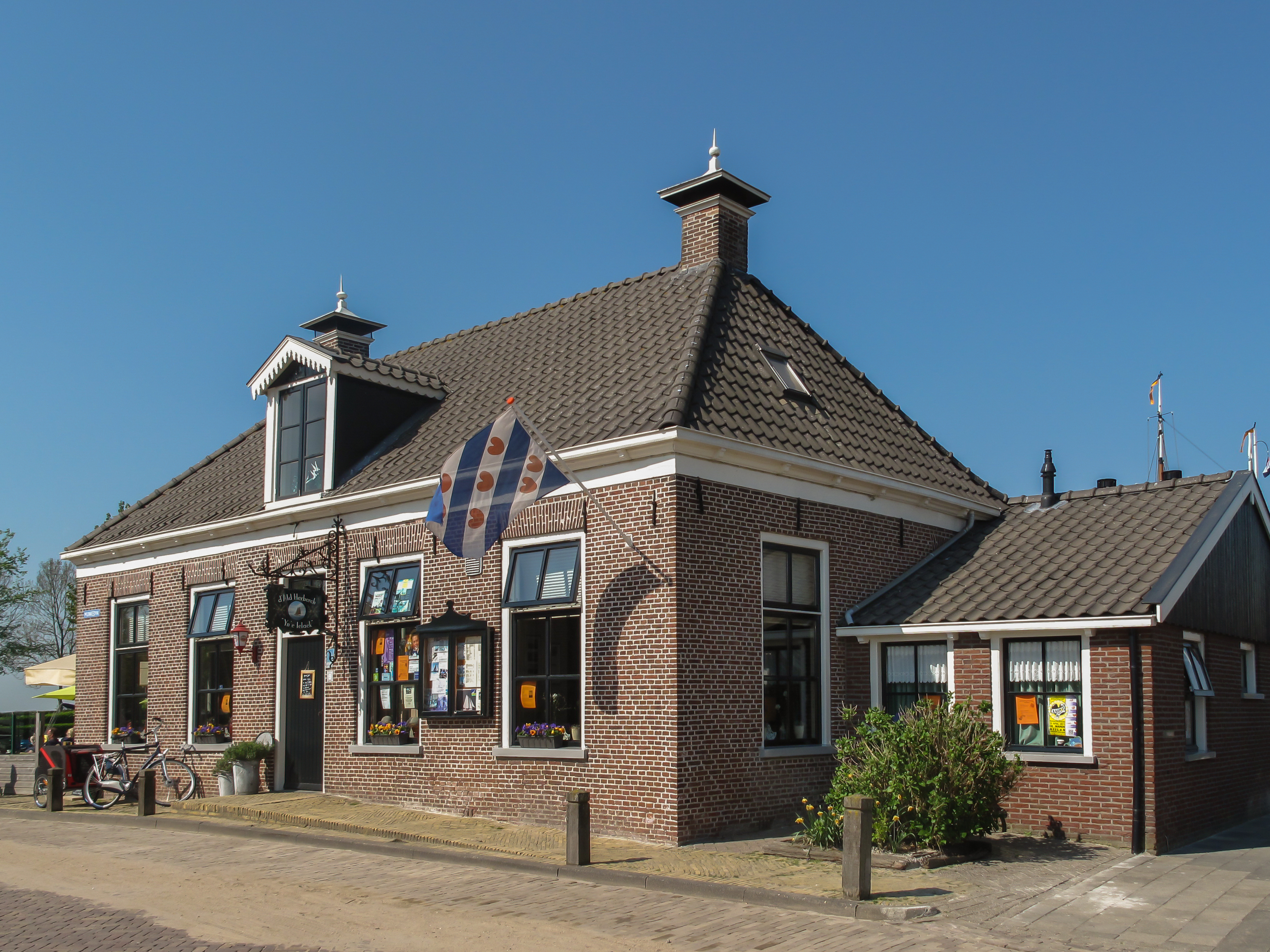
Monumentaal house

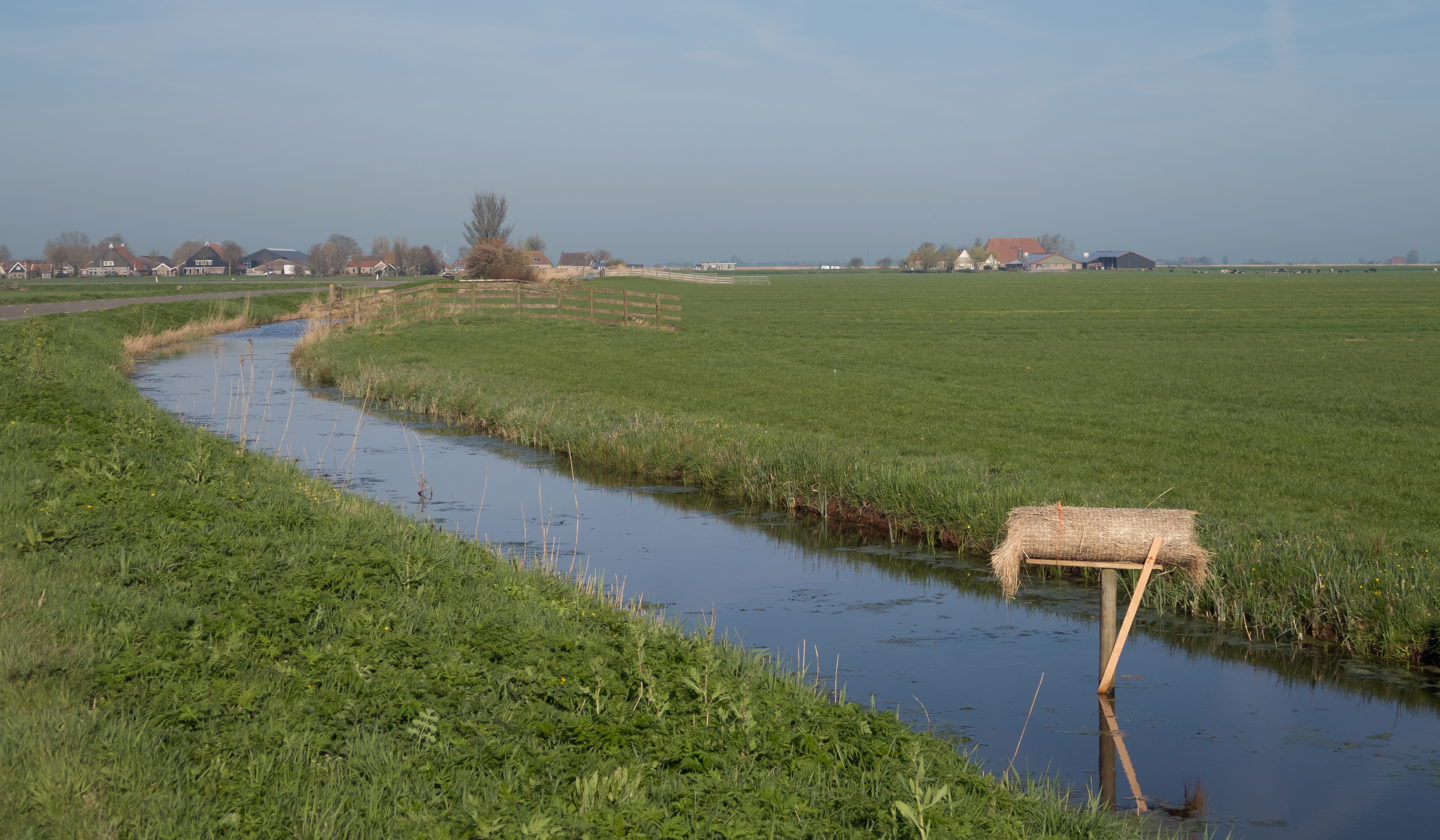
Ditch in the polder landscape near the village
