= De Kaai, Sleat =

Windmill in Sloten, Netherlands

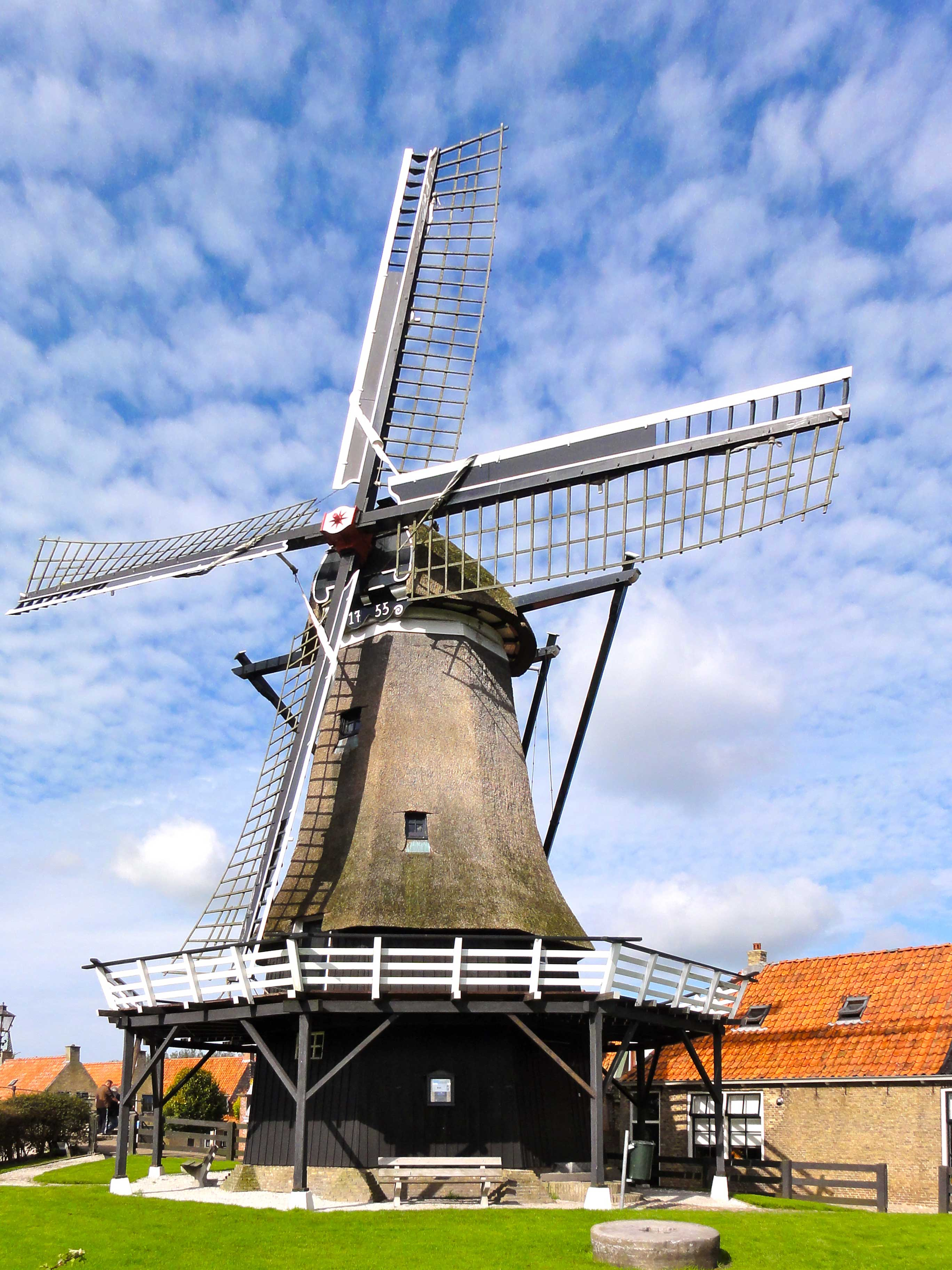
- De Kaai, September 2011

Origin
- Mill name: De Kaai; De Korenmolen
- Mill location: Bolwerk ZZ 81, 8556 XS Sleat
- Coordinates: 53°13′19″N 5°29′20″E
- Operator(s): Vereniging De Korenmolen
- Year built: 1755

Information
- Purpose: Corn mill
- Type: Smock mill
- Storeys: Three storey smock
- Base storeys: Two storey base
- Smock sides: Eight sides
- No. of sails: Four sails
- Type of sails: Common sails
- Windshaft: Cast iron
- Winding: Tailpole and winch
- No. of pairs of millstones: Two pairs
- Size of millstones: 1.40 metres (4 ft 7 in) diameter and 1.30 metres (4 ft 3 in) diameter

De Kaai (English: The Key) is a smock mill in Sleat, Friesland, Netherlands which was built in 1755 and is in working order. The mill is listed as a Rijksmonument.

== History ==
The mill stands on the Lemster Waterpoort. A post mill stood here in the sixteenth century. it was destroyed in 1593. Another post mill replaced it. It was shown on a map dated 1664 and in a drawing dated c. 1723.

De Kaai was built in 1755. For many years it was known as De Korenmolen (English: The Corn Mill). It was given its name in 2006, derived from its position by one of the two water gates in Sleat. An early photograph shows that the mill originally had a wooden windshaft and the smock tower had vertical boards. In 1829, the mill was owned by Gerhard Wenzel ten Brink, a merchant in Sleat. On 9 June 1870, it was sold to Daniël Ruurd Westra, passing to his son Fedde in 1890. On 7 October 1897. the mill was bought at auction by Thijs Bosma for ƒ925. He later sold the mill privately to Pieter Gerrits Bosma for ƒ900. By the 1920s, the mill was derelict.

The mill was one of the earliest in the Netherlands to be preserved. It was sold by Pieter Gerrits Bosma on 14 January 1929 to the Vereniging De Korenmolen for ƒ250. Repairs costing ƒ1,495 were carried out by millwright Joustra of Tjerkgaast, Friesland. On 9 December 1930, the mill was struck by lightning, damaging the sails. Repairs by Joustra cost ƒ479. In 1949, the mill was restored by millwright Straatsma of Sleat at a cost of ƒ7,472.72. The mill was restored a number of times in the twentieth century; Apart from that carried out in 1929 and 1949, further restorations were carried out in 1963, 1975, 1985 and 1992–94. The latter was carried out by millwright B Dijkstra of Sleat. A further restoration in 2010 was carried out by millwright by the firm Bouw en Molenbouw Bertis Dijkstra, of Sleat. The mill is listed as a Rijksmonument, № 33840.

== Description ==
De Kaai is what the Dutch describe as a "Stellingmolen". It is a smock mill on a brick base. The stage is 3.40 metres (11 ft 2 in) above ground level. The smock and cap are thatched. The mill is winded by tailpole and winch. The sails are Common sails. They have a span of 18.10 metres (59 ft 5 in). The sails are carried on a cast-iron windshaft, which was cast by the IJzergieterij De Prins van Oranje, The Hague, South Holland in 1876. The windshaft also carries the brake wheel, which has 48 cogs. This drives the wallower (25 cogs) at the top of the upright shaft. At the bottom of the upright shaft is the great spur wheel, which has 70 cogs. The great spur wheel drives a pair of 1.40 metres (4 ft 7 in) diameter Cullen millstones via a lantern pinion stone nut which has 25 staves and a pair of 1.30 metres (4 ft 3 in) diameter Cullen millstones via a lantern pinion stone nut which has 24 staves.

== Millers ==
- Gerhard Wenzel ten Brink (1829–1870)
- Daniël Ruurd Westra (1870–1890)
- Fedde Westra (1890–1897)

References for above:-

== Public access ==
De Kaai is open to the public on Saturdays between 13:00 and 17:00 from May through September, and between 10:00 and 12:00 from October through April.
