= Nijhuizum =

Nijhuizum Nijhuzum
- Village
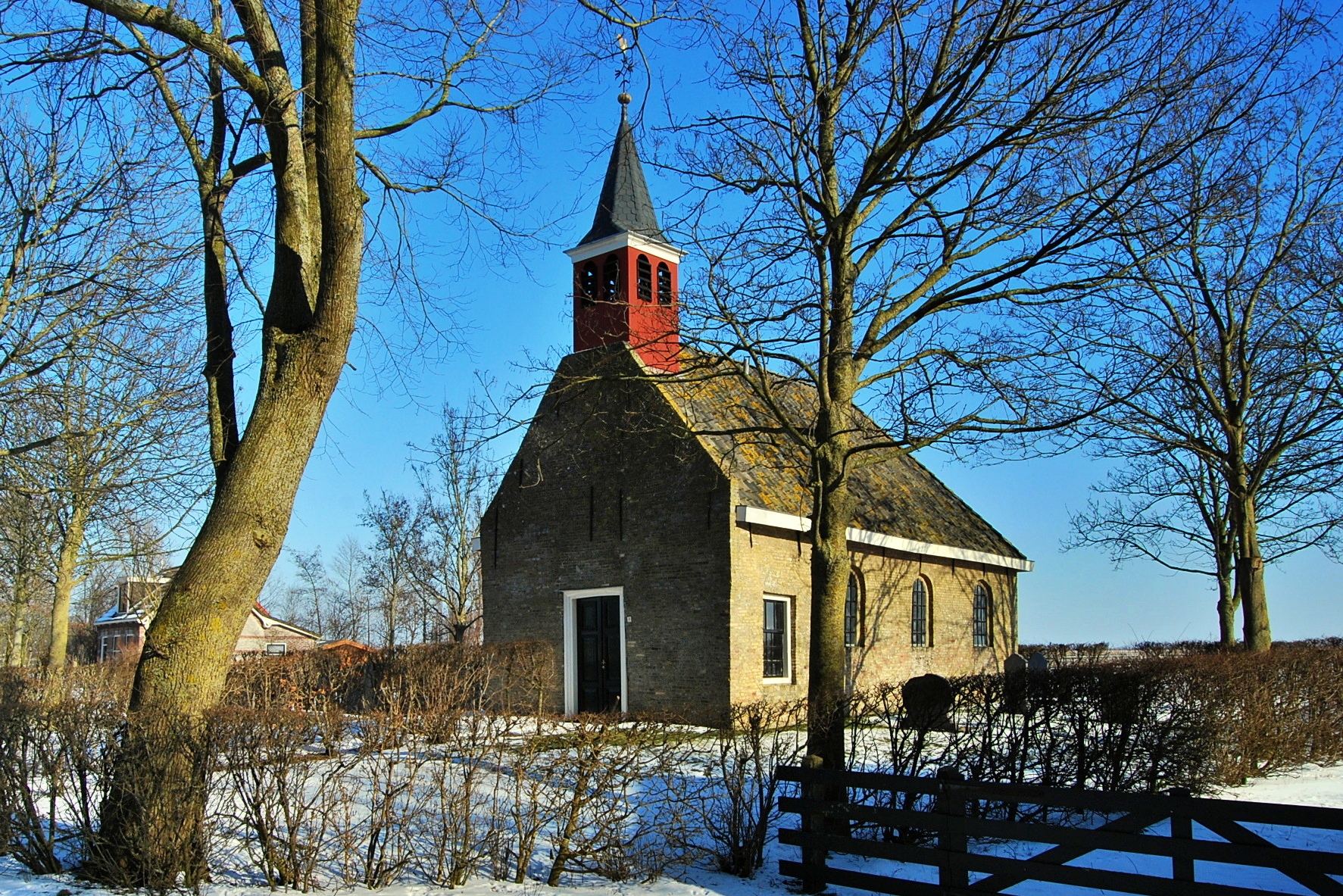
- Nijhuizum Church

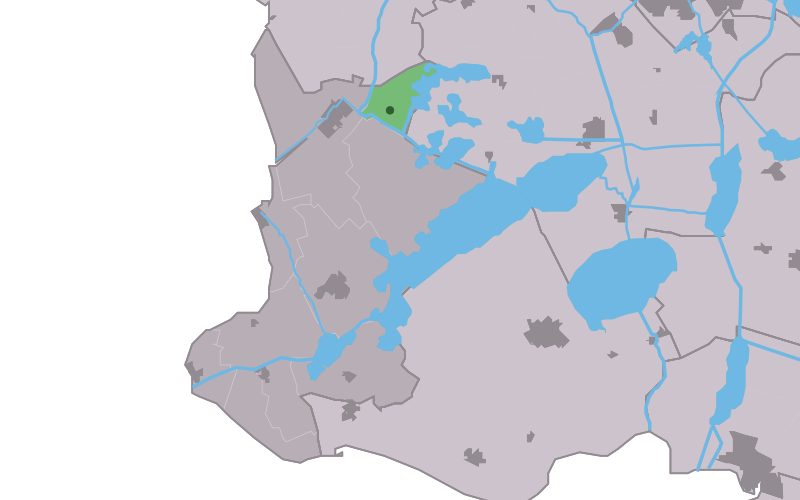
- Location in the former Nijefurd municipality

- Location in the Netherlands Nijhuizum (Netherlands)
- Country: Netherlands
- Province: Friesland
- Municipality: Súdwest-Fryslân

Area
  - Total: 5.03 km^{2} (1.94 sq mi)
- Elevation: −0.1 m (−0.33 ft)

Population (2021)
  - Total: 55
  - Density: 11/km^{2} (28/sq mi)
- Time zone: UTC+1 (CET)
  - Summer (DST): UTC+2 (CEST)
- Postal code: 8775
- Dialing code: 0515

Nijhuizum (West Frisian: Nijhuzum [ˈnɛihyzm̩]) is a village in Súdwest-Fryslân in the province of Friesland, the Netherlands with a population of around 55 in January 2017.

== History ==
The village was first mentioned in 1449 as Nyahusen, and means new houses. Nijhuizum is surrounded by lakes and can only be accessed by car from a dead-end road from Workum. There is a ferry for pedestrians and cyclists to Gaastmeer.

The Dutch Reformed church dates from 1721, and is a replacement of a 13th-century predecessor.

Nijhuizum was home to 70 people in 1840. Before 2011, the village was part of the Nijefurd municipality and before 1984 it belonged to Wymbritseradiel.

== Gallery ==
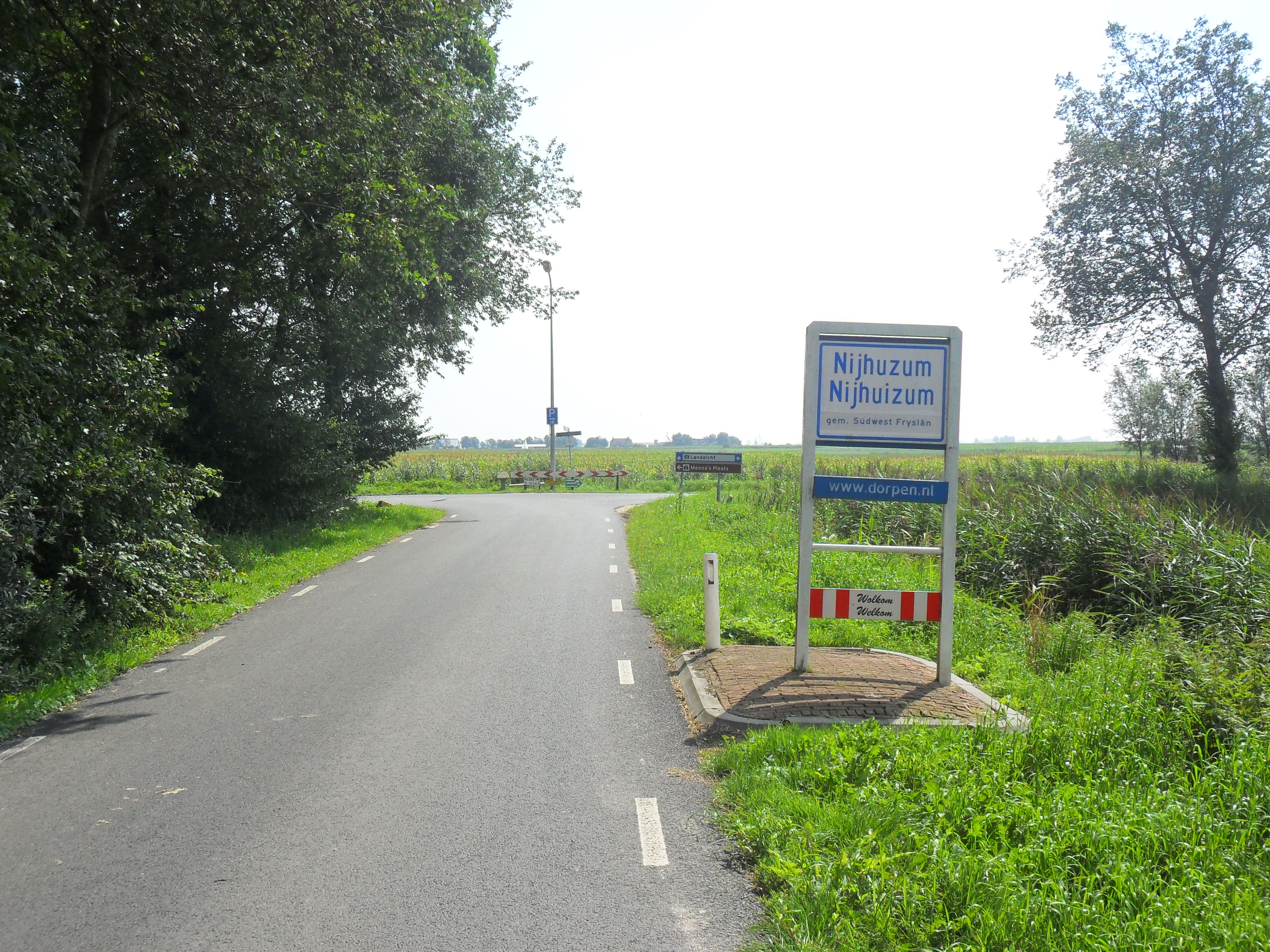
Welcome to Nijhuizum

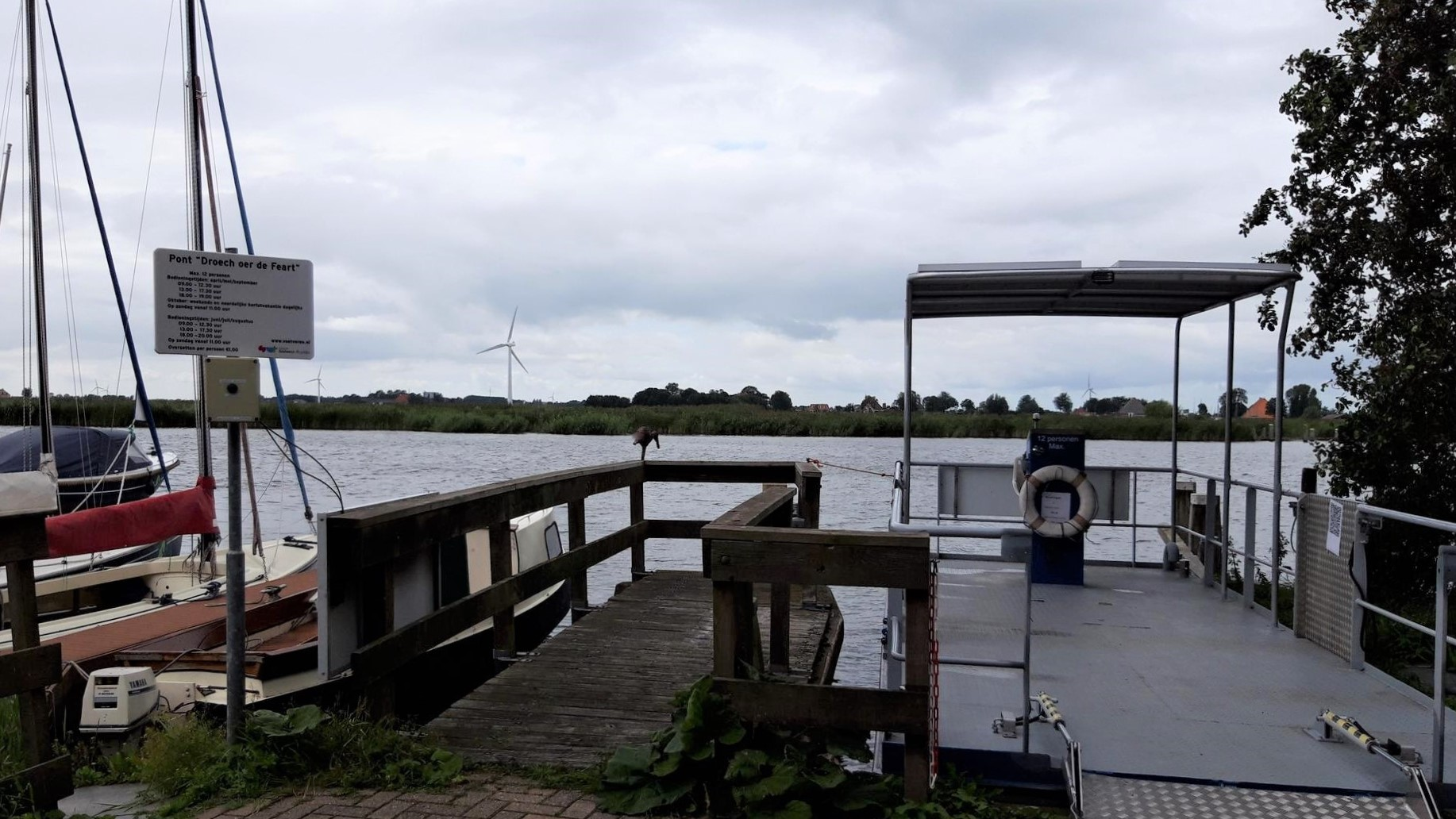
Ferry to Gaastmeer
