= Fatum, Friesland =

Fatum Fâtum (West Frisian)
- Hamlet
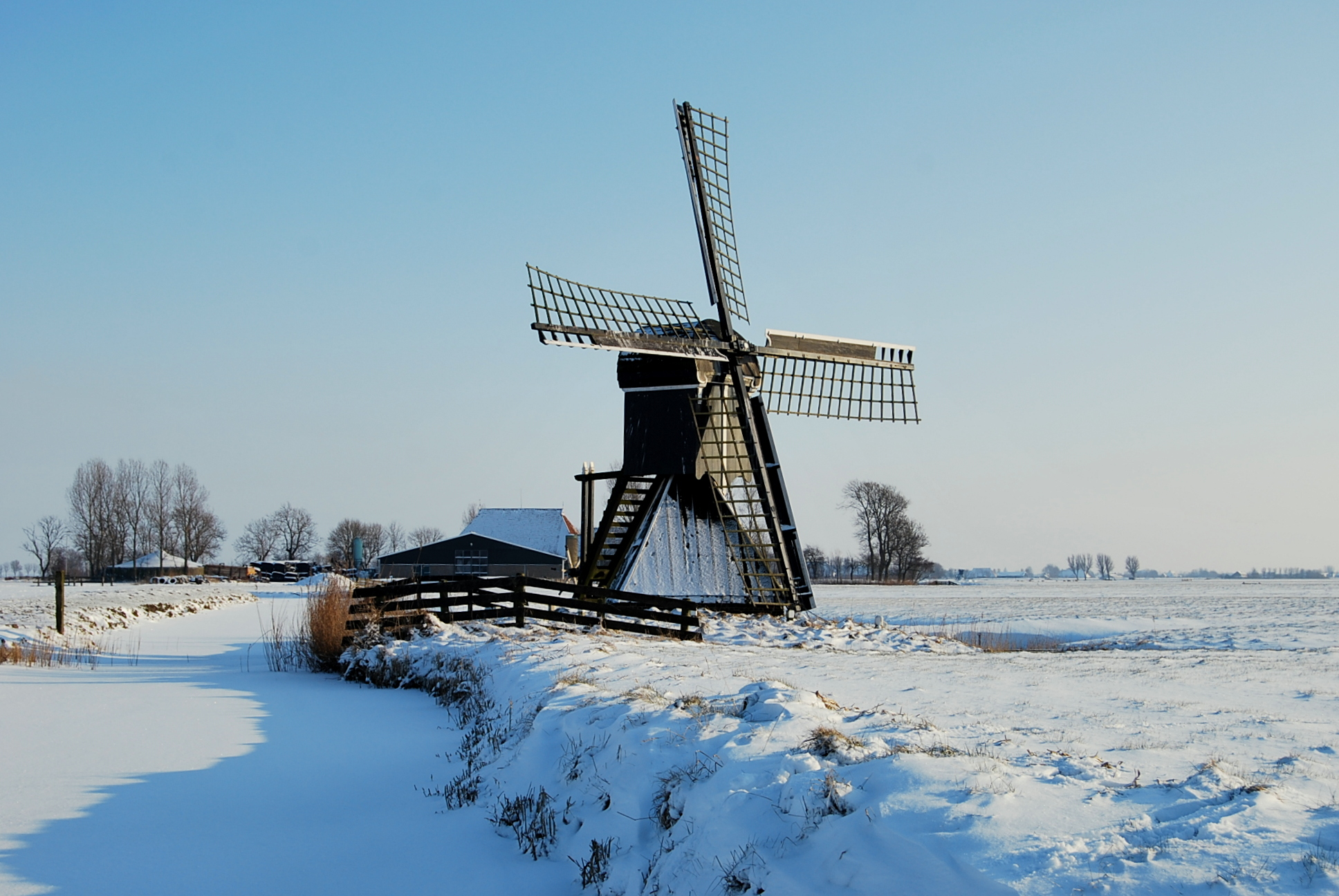
- Fatum windmill near Fatum

- Location in the province of Friesland in the Netherlands Fatum (Netherlands)
- Coordinates: 53.14607°N 5.57170°E
- Country: Netherlands
- Province: Friesland
- Municipality: Waadhoeke
- Village: Tzum
- Elevation: 0.5 m (1.6 ft)

Population
  - Total: c. 20
- Time zone: UTC+1 (CET)
  - Summer (DST): UTC+2 (CEST)
- Postcode: 8804
- Area code: 0517

Fatum (Dutch: [ˈfaːtʏm]; West Frisian: Fâtum or Fâltum) is a hamlet in the Dutch municipality of Waadhoeke in the province of Friesland. It is located northwest of Spannum and southwest of Tzum, of which it is a part administratively. The residences are located on the Wommelserweg between the hamlets De Kampen and Teetlum. In the hamlet is a windmill with the same name.

Fatum originated on a terp over which the Wommelserweg runs. In 1433 it was first mentioned in a copy as Faltma, in 1457 as Faltum, in 1511 as Fautum and in 1718 as Faldum and Faatum. In the 19th century the last two also occur in addition to Fatum.

The place name probably points to the fact that it was the residence (-heem/-um) of or founded by the person Falda or Falte. It is sometimes also thought that the name refers to a place of residence near a fenced sheepfold or milking parlor (fald).
