= De Geeuwpoldermolen, Oppenhuizen =

Windmill in Oppenhuizen, Netherlands

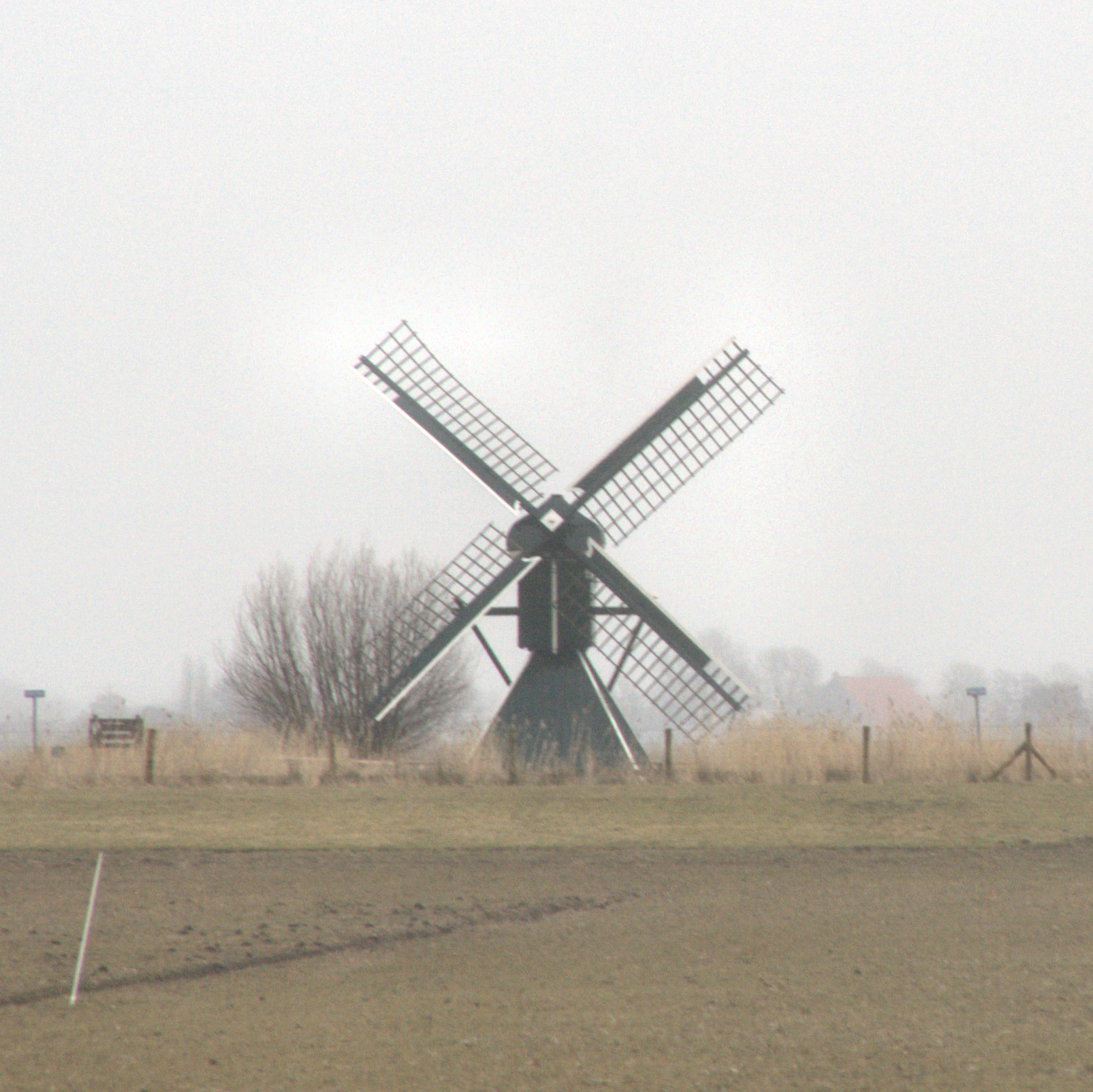
- Spinnenkop in 2010
- Interactive map of De Geeuwpoldermolen, Oppenhuizen

Origin
- Mill name: Geeuwpoldermolen
- Mill location: East of Oppenhuizen
- Coordinates: 53°0′46″N 5°43′26″E
- Operator: Stichting De Fryske Mole
- Year built: 1832, restored 1987

Information
- Purpose: Drainage mill
- Type: Hollow post
- Roundhouse storeys: Single storey roundhouse
- No. of sails: Four sails
- Type of sails: Common sails
- Windshaft: Wood
- Winding: Tailpole and winch
- Type of pump: Archimedes' screw

The Geeuwpoldermolen (or Geau's Mole in West Frisian) is a drainage mill near the twin village of Oppenhuizen, Friesland, Netherlands. It is a hollow post windmill of the type called spinnenkop by the Dutch. The mill is listed as a Rijksmonument, number 39810 and it is still in use for draining the Geeuwpolder. It was almost completely renewed at a restoration in 1987, earlier restorations were in 1954 and 1965.

== History ==
The exact year of construction is uncertain, 1832 or 1841 are mentioned. Though restored earlier, the mill was in a bad state of repair when Stichting De Fryske Mole became owner in 1981. It was scratched from the list of protected monuments and a permit for demolishment had already been given before the national government could be persuaded to at least pay for the yearly maintenance. Money was raised from other public and private parties and by selling postcards to pay for the four year restoration. In 1988 the work was completed and the windmill is currently in regular use to drain the Geeuwpolder. This polder is one of the last remaining summer polders, it is only drained during the summer and allowed to flood in winter. The polder is now a nature reserve owned by Staatsbosbeheer (English: State Forest Management).

== Description ==
The Geeuwpoldermolen is what the Dutch describe as a spinnenkop (English: spiderhead mill). It is a small hollow post mill winded by a winch. The four common sails have a span of 12.20 metres (40 ft 0 in) and are carried on a wooden windshaft. The brake wheel on the windshaft drives the wallower at the top of the upright shaft in the body, which passed through the main post into the substructure. At the bottom of the upright shaft, the crown wheel drives the Archimedes' screw. The screw is 1 metre (3 ft 3 in) in diameter. Both body and substructure are weatherboarded with boulders attached to the four lower corners by chains to protect it against blowing over in a storm. It is supported on four brick pillars.

== Public access ==
The mill is open to the public by appointment. It is located on the bank of the Prinses Margriet Canal and can only be reached by boat.
