= De Klaver, Bolsward =

Windmill in Bolsward, Netherlands

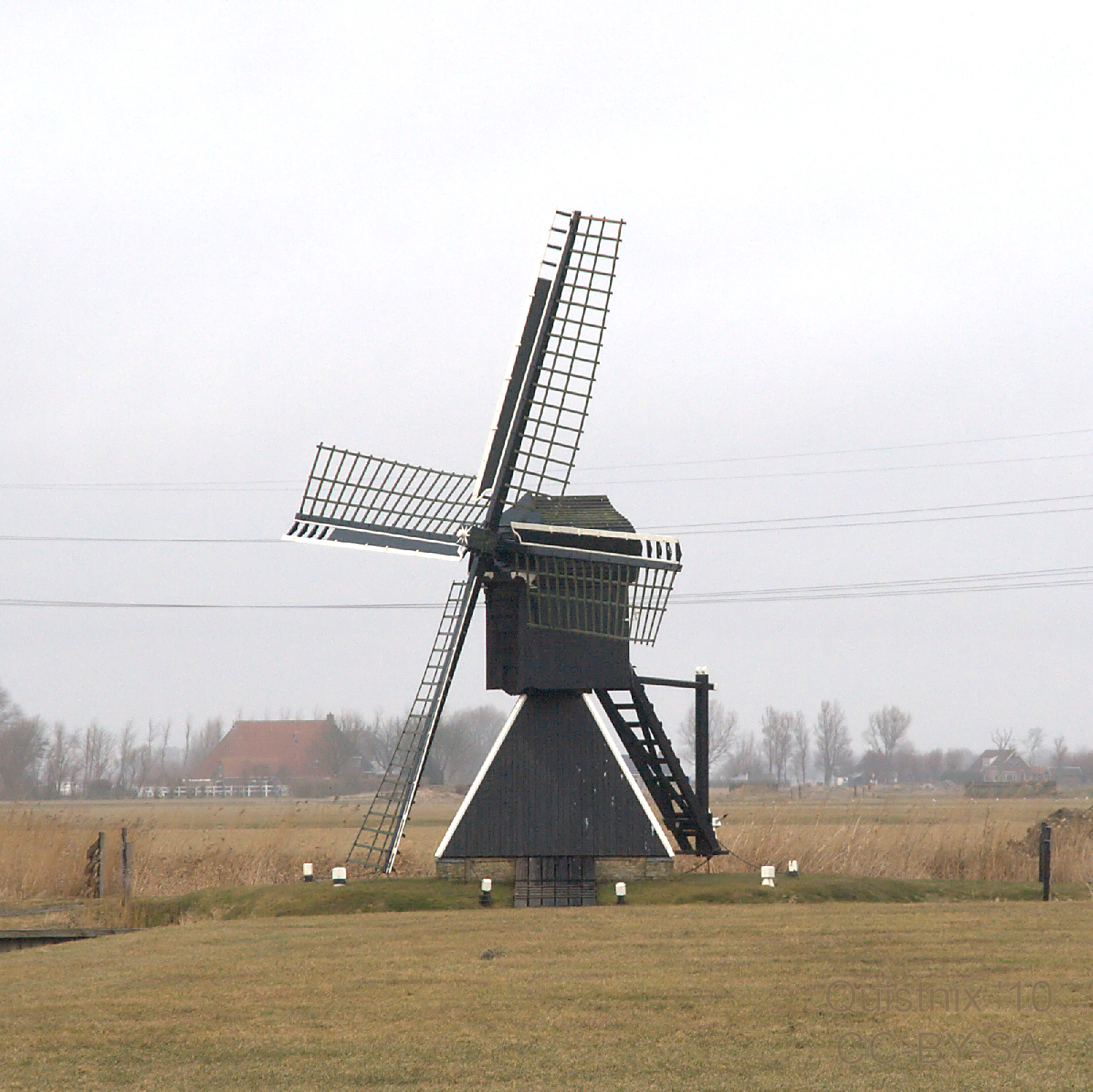
- De Klaver, March 2010

Origin
- Mill name: De Klaver; De Greate Klaver
- Mill location: Marneweg 15, 8701 PM, Bolsward
- Coordinates: 53.0717°N 5.5039°E
- Operator(s): Stichting Fryske Mole
- Year built: 1802

Information
- Purpose: Drainage mill
- Type: Hollow post mill
- Roundhouse storeys: Single storey roundhouse
- No. of sails: Four sails
- Type of sails: Common sails
- Windshaft: Wood
- Winding: Winch
- Auxiliary power: Tractor
- Type of pump: Archimedes' screw

De Klaver (English: The Clover) or De Greate Klaver is a hollow post mill in Bolsward, Friesland, Netherlands which has been restored to working order. The mill is listed as a Rijksmonument, number 9860.

== History ==
De Klaver was built in 1802. It drained an area of 249 pondemaat (91 ha; 226 acres). Of this area, 34 pondemaat (12 ha; 31 acres) belonged to the mill owner, 50 pondemaat (18 ha; 45 acres) belonged to an orphanage and the remainder was divided amongst numerous other owners. The mill was in use until 1966. In that year a steel Archimedes' screw replaced the existing one. This was driven by a tractor. Restoration took place over the winter of 1980–81. The restored mill was opened on 10 June 1981. It was sold in that year to Stichting De Fryske Mole (English:Frisian Mills Foundation) for ƒ1.

== Description ==
De Klaver is what the Dutch describe as a "spinnekopmolen" (English: Spider mill). It is a small hollow post mill winded by a winch. The four Common sails, which have a span of 12.00 metres (39 ft 4 in), are carried in a wooden windshaft. The windshaft also carries the brake wheel which has 33 pegs. This drives the wallower (17 pegs) at the top of the upright shaft, which passed through the main post. At the bottom of the upright shaft, the crown wheel (32 pegs) drives the Archimedes' screw via a gear wheel with 31 pegs. The Archimedes' screw has an axle diameter of 275 millimetres (10¾ in) and is 910 millimetres (3 ft 0 in) diameter overall. It is inclined at an angle of 27½°. Each revolution of the screw lifts 152 litres (33 imp gal) of water.

== Public access ==
De Klaver is open to the public by appointment.
