= Lonjé Molen, Bolsward =

Smock mill in the Netherlands

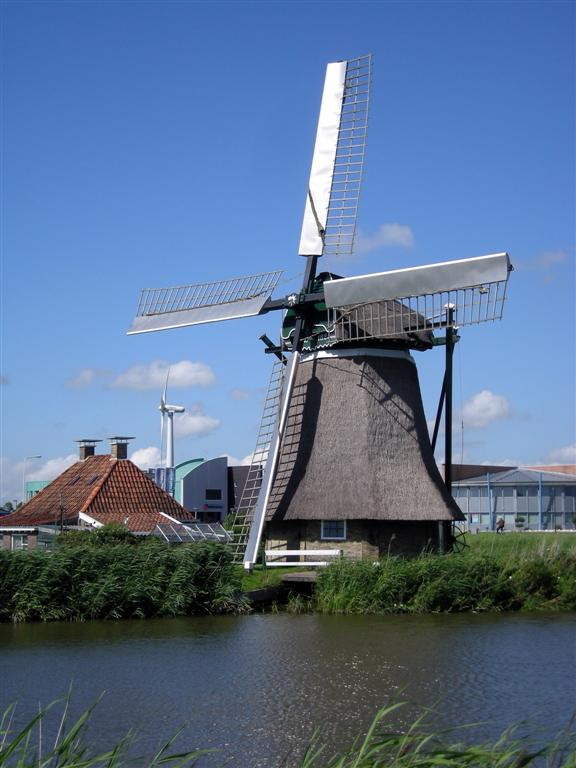
- Lonjé Molen, July 2007
- Interactive map of Lonjé Molen, Bolsward

Origin
- Mill name: Lonjé Molen; Tadema's Molen
- Mill location: Oude Rijksweg 6, 8701 MD, Bolsward
- Coordinates: 53°03′51″N 5°30′01″E
- Operator: Wetterskip Fryslân
- Year built: 1824

Information
- Purpose: Drainage mill
- Type: Smock mill
- Storeys: Three-storey smock
- Base storeys: Single-storey base
- Smock sides: Eight sides
- No. of sails: Four sails
- Type of sails: Dekkerised Common sails
- Windshaft: Cast iron
- Winding: Tailpole and winch
- Auxiliary power: Electric motor
- Type of pump: Archimedes' screw

Lonjé Molen or Tadema's Molen is a smock mill in Bolsward, Friesland, Netherlands which has been restored to working order. The mill is listed as a Rijksmonument, number 9861.

== History ==
Lonjé Molen was built in 1824. The mill was also named Tadema's Molen after one of the millmen. In 1933, the mill was fitted with Dekkerised sails. In 1948/49 it was proposed that an electric motor would be installed to drive the mill. This proposal was dropped in 1950. The sails were renewed in 1959. In 1967 an electric motor was installed, but arranged so the mill could still work too. The mill was restored in 1970/71. Further restoration work was done by millwrights Bouwbedrijf Hiemstra of Tzummarum in the early 2000s, at a cost of €100,000. The official reopening by Mayor Koopmans of Bolsward took place on 18 September 2002.

== Description ==
Lonjé's Molen is what the Dutch describe as an "achtkante grondzeiler". It is a smock mill winded by a winch. There is no stage, the sails weirdly reaching almost to the ground. The mill has a single-storey brick base and a three-storey smock. The smock and cap are thatched. The four Common sails have leading edges streamlined with the Dekker system. They have a span of 18.72 metres (61 ft 5 in) and are carried in a cast-iron windshaft. This was cast by the Koninklijke Nederlandse Grof Smederij, Leiden, North Holland in 1897. The windshaft also carries the brake wheel which has 47 cogs. This drives the wallower (28 cogs) at the top of the upright shaft. At the bottom of the upright shaft, the crown wheel (35 cogs) drives the wooden Archimedes' screw via a gear wheel with 31 cogs. The Archimedes' screw has an axle diameter of 532 millimetres (1 ft 9 in) and is 1.43 metres (4 ft 8 in) diameter overall. It is inclined at an angle of 22°. Each revolution of the screw lifts 907 litres (200 imp gal) of water.

== Public access ==
Lonjé Molen is open to the public by appointment.
