= Victor, Wanswerd =

Drainage mill in Wanswerd, Netherlands

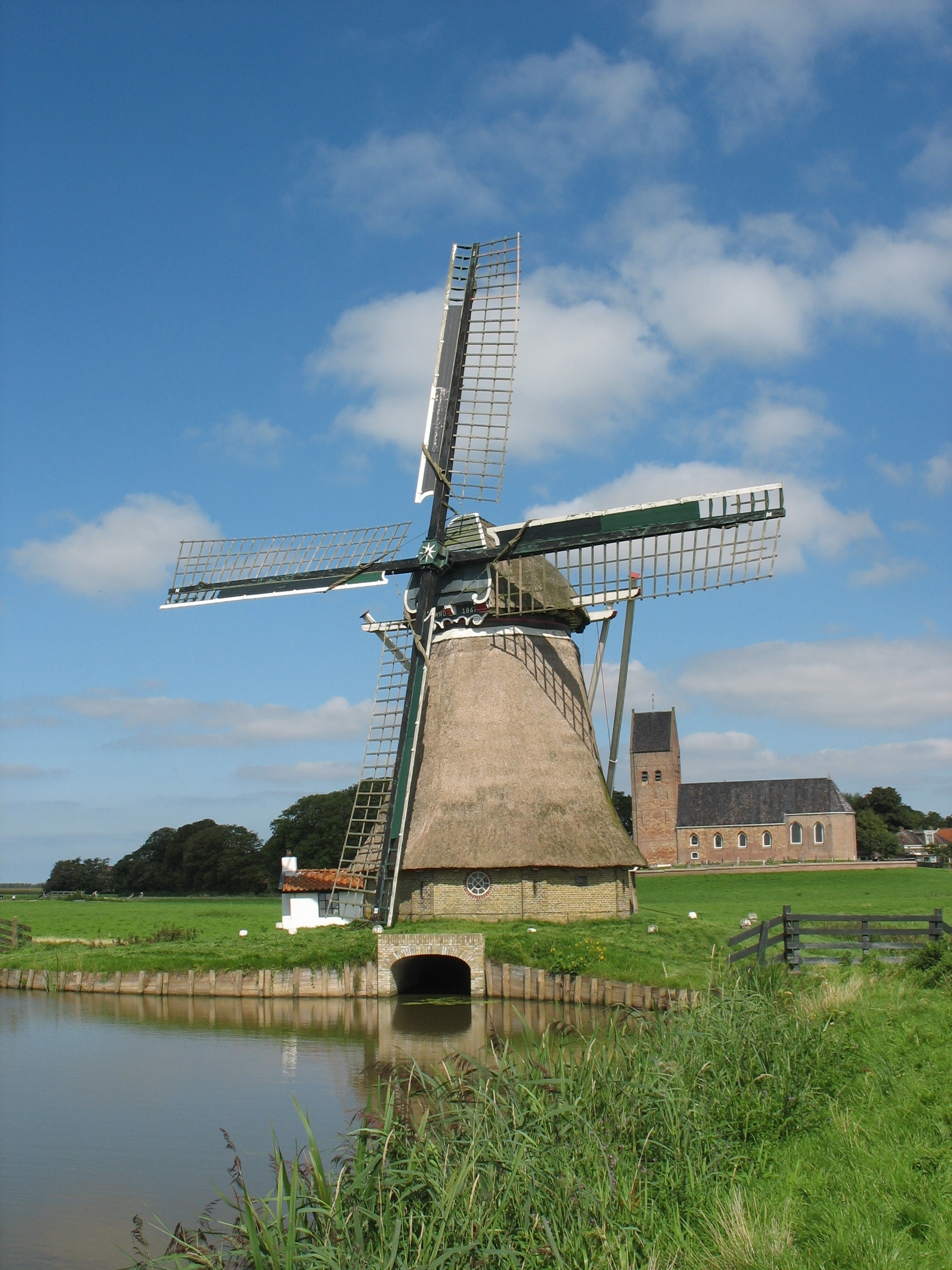
- De Victor and the terp with church of Wanswerd in the background

Origin
- Mill name: De Victor
- Mill location: Near Wanswerd
- Coordinates: 53°17′56.9″N 5°50′59″E
- Operator(s): Stichting De Fryske Mole
- Year built: 1867

Information
- Purpose: Drainage mill
- Type: Smock mill
- Storeys: Three-storey smock
- Base storeys: One-storey base
- Smock sides: Eight sides
- No. of sails: Four sails
- Type of sails: Common sails
- Windshaft: Cast iron
- Winding: Tailpole and winch
- Auxiliary power: Diesel engine
- Type of pump: Archimedes' screw

The Victor is a drainage mill in Wanswerd (West Frisian: Wânswert), Friesland, Netherlands. The mill is listed as a Rijksmonument, number 15644.

== History ==
In 1867, De Victor was built to replace 6 smaller drainage mills and 3 tjaskers. The mill was taken over by Stichting De Fryske Mole in 1975 and restored in 1977 when the original Patent Sails were replaced by common sails. In 2006 the windmill was designated as a reserve for emergency situations. The mill is currently awaiting restoration, among which repairs to its foundations, expecting to start in spring 2012.

== Description ==
The Victor is what the Dutch describe as an "achtkante grondzeiler". It is a smock mill without a stage, the sails reaching almost to the ground. The brick base is one storey high with a three-storey smock on top. Both smock and cap are thatched. The mill is winded by tailpole and winch. The cap is carried on 16 fixed cast-iron rollers instead of the in the Netherlands common wooden blocks or unfixed rollers moving along a rail, meaning the entire weight of the cap and sails is carried by the axles of the rollers.

The four common sails have a span of 19.60 metres (64 ft 4 in) and are carried on a cast-iron windshaft cast by foundry Koning in 1911 as number 0210. Gears and the upright shaft bring the windpower to the Archimedes' screw which is 1.43 metres (4 ft 8 in) in diameter and can lift 894 litres (197 imp gal) of water per revolution.

A 22 hp Lister HA diesel engine, once used as auxiliary power, is still in situ in the mill but is no longer connected to the Archimedes' screw.

== Public access ==
The mill is open to the public by appointment.
