= De Gans, Ezumazijl =

Smock mill in Ezumazijl, Friesland, Netherlands

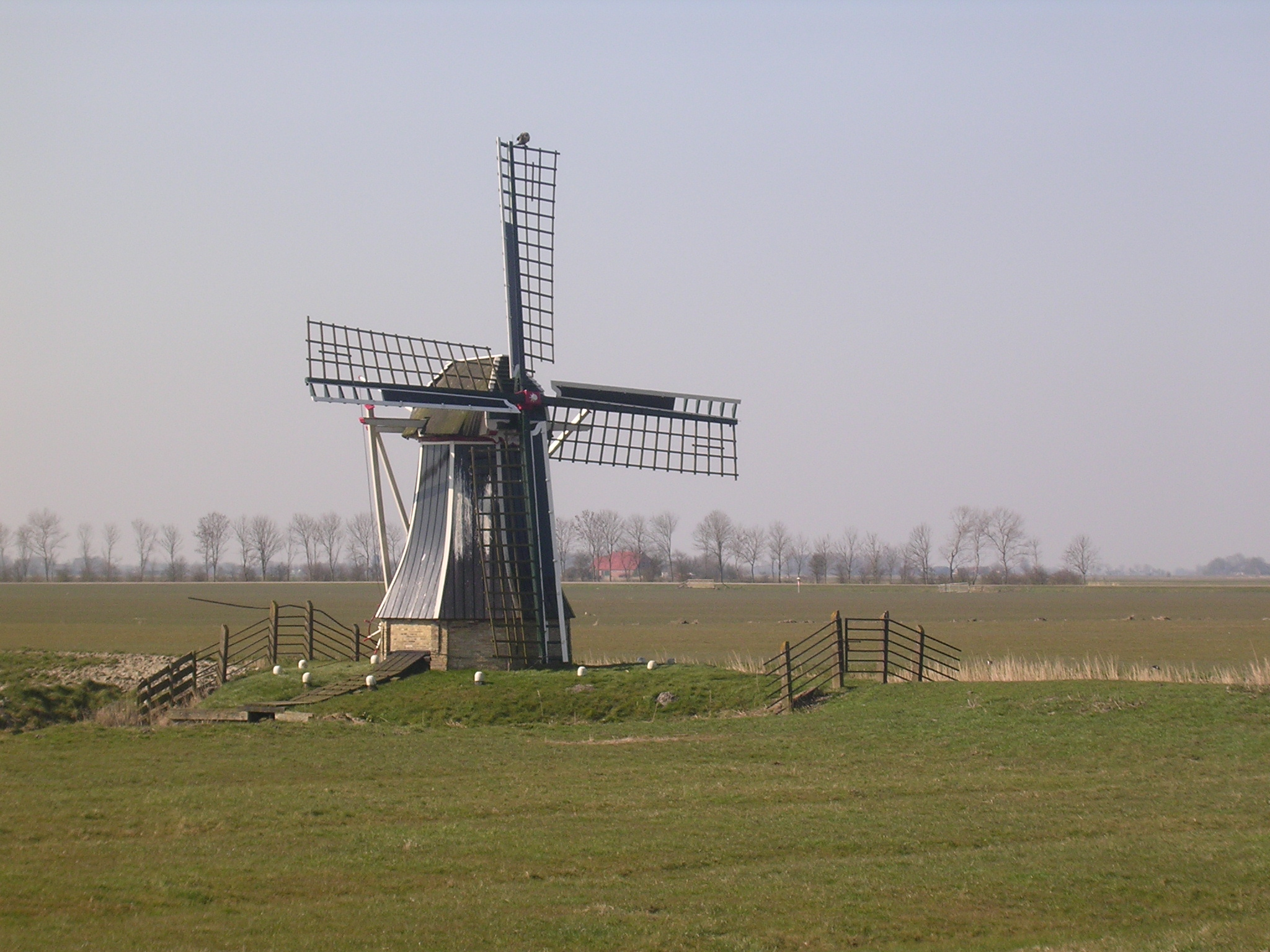
- De Gans, March 2007
- Interactive map of De Gans, Ezumazijl

Origin
- Mill name: De Gans
- Mill location: Tibsterwei, 9133 DM, Ezumazijl
- Coordinates: 53°20′58″N 6°18′29″E
- Operator: Stichting Monumentenbehoud Dongeradeel
- Year built: 1850

Information
- Purpose: Drainage mill
- Type: Smock mill
- Storeys: Two-storey smock
- Base storeys: Single-storey base
- Smock sides: Eight sides
- No. of sails: Four sails
- Type of sails: Common sails
- Windshaft: Cast iron
- Winding: Tailpole and winch
- Type of pump: Archimedes' screw

De Gans (English: The Goose) is a smock mill in Ezumazijl, Friesland, Netherlands which has been restored to working order. The mill is listed as a Rijksmonument, number 31571.

== History ==
De Gans was built in 1850 by farmer Martinus Aukes Wierda who owned the Guozzepôle farm. The mill drained the Ganzenpolder. It drained 28 hectares (69 acres) of land, depositing the drainage water into the Zuider Ee.

By 1962, it was uneconomic to work the mill and it was replaced by an electric motor. It had been sold to the local authority by 1965. In 1970, the mill was restored by millwright De Roos of Leeuwarden. During this restoration the Patent sails were replaced with Common sails. The mill retained its wooden windshaft after this restoration. In 1988, the mill was again restored, this time by Thijs Jellema of Birdaard. A new cast-iron windshaft was fitted. The old wooden windshaft is preserved in De Zwaluw, Birdaard. De Gans is the sole survivor of six windmills which formerly drained the Ganzenpolder.

== Description ==
De Gans is what the Dutch describe as an achtkante grondzeiler - a smock mill whose sails reach almost to the ground. It is a two-storey smock mill on a single-storey base. The mill is winded by tailpole and winch. The smock is covered in vertical wooden boards. The sails are Common sails. They have a span of 10.60 metres (34 ft 9 in). The sails are carried on a cast-iron windshaft. The windshaft also carries the brake wheel which has 32 cogs. This drives the wallower (18 cogs) at the top of the upright shaft. At the bottom of the upright shaft, the crown wheel, which has 28 cogs drives a gearwheel with 26 cogs on the axle of the Archimedes' screw. The axle of the screw is 210 millimetres (2¼ inches) diameter and the screw is 710 millimetres (2 ft 4 in) diameter and 4.00 metres (13 ft 1 in) long. The screw is inclined at 24°. Each revolution of the screw lifts 83.8 litres (18.4 imp gal) of water.
