= Protestant church of Jistrum =

Protestant church of Jistrum Saint Peter's church
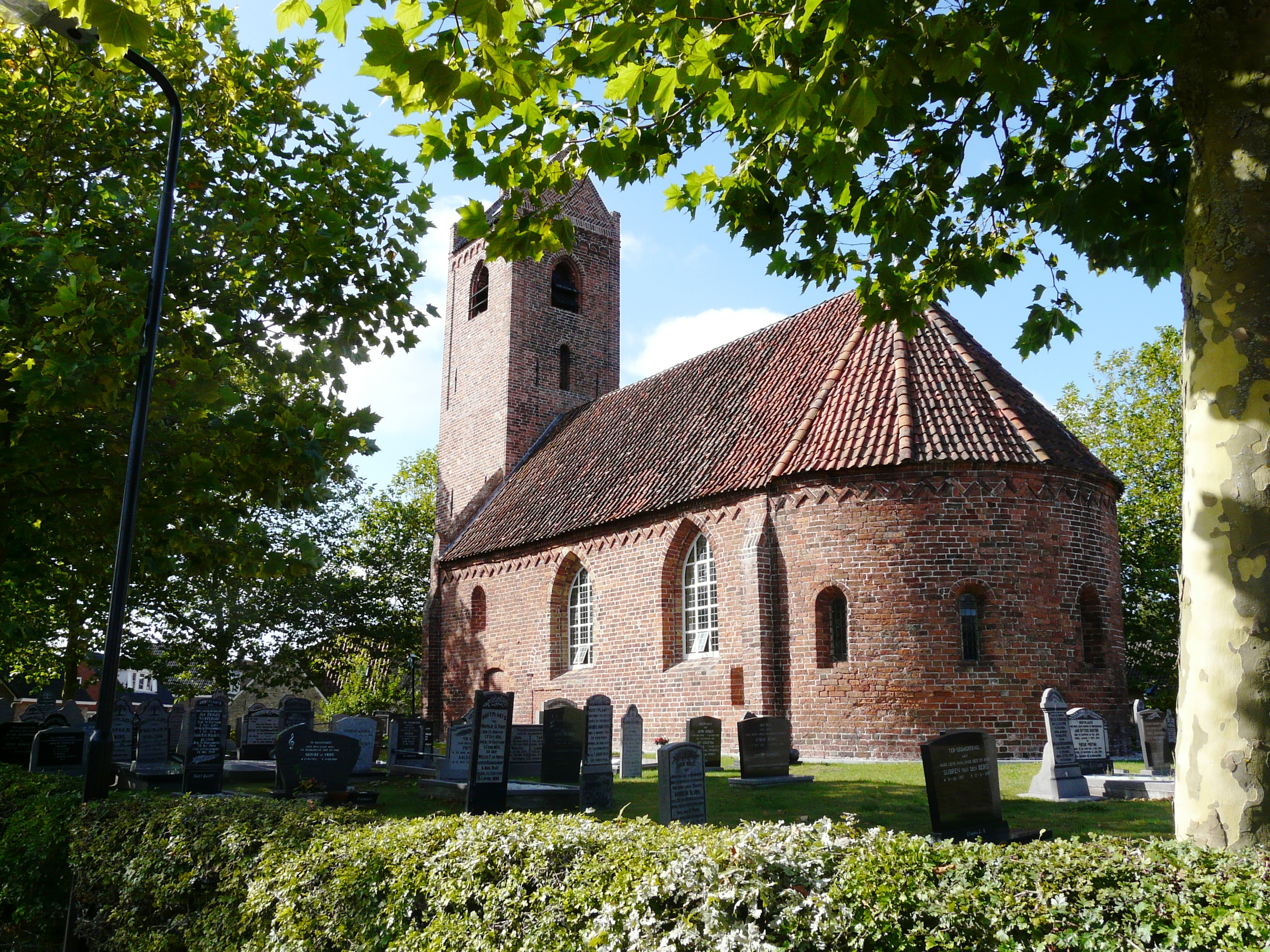
- Church of Jistrum
- Protestant church of Jistrum; Saint Peter's church
- 53.2122°N 6.0668°E

History
- Dedication: Before the Reformation, to Saint Peter

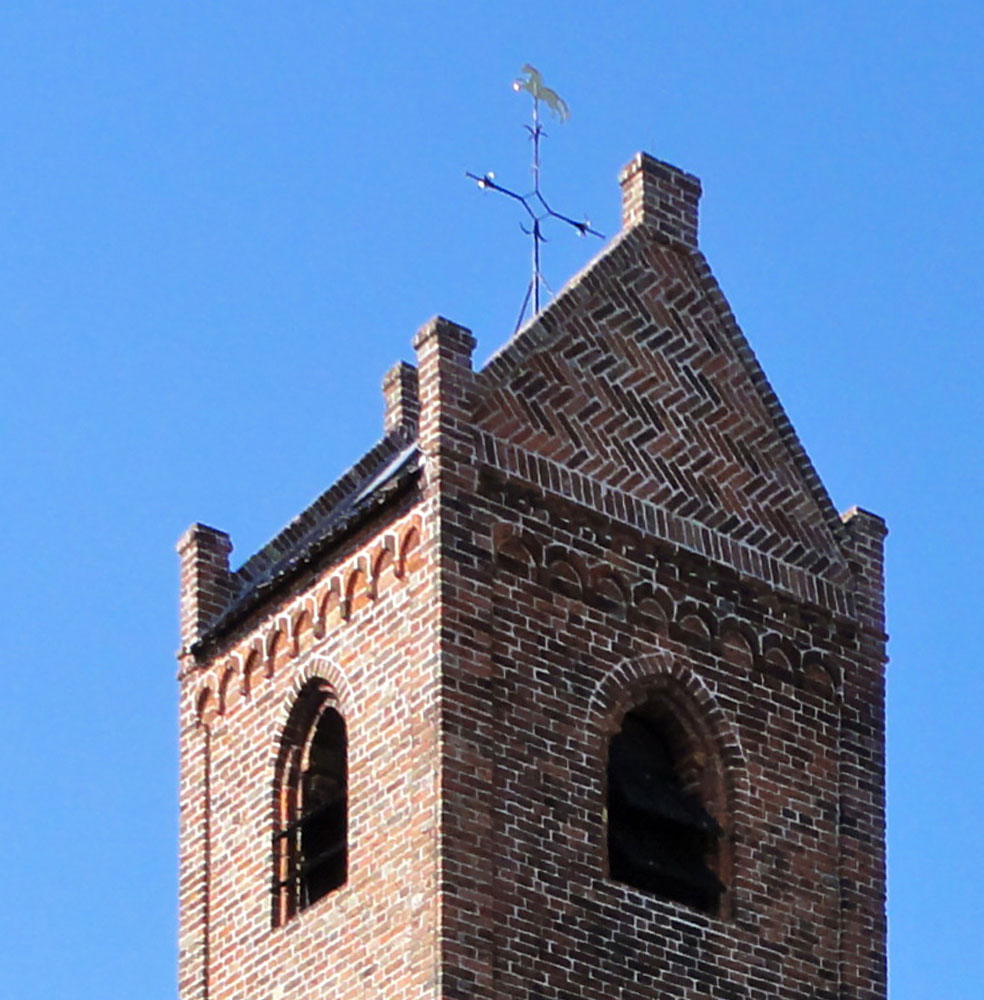
The weather vane on top of the tower.

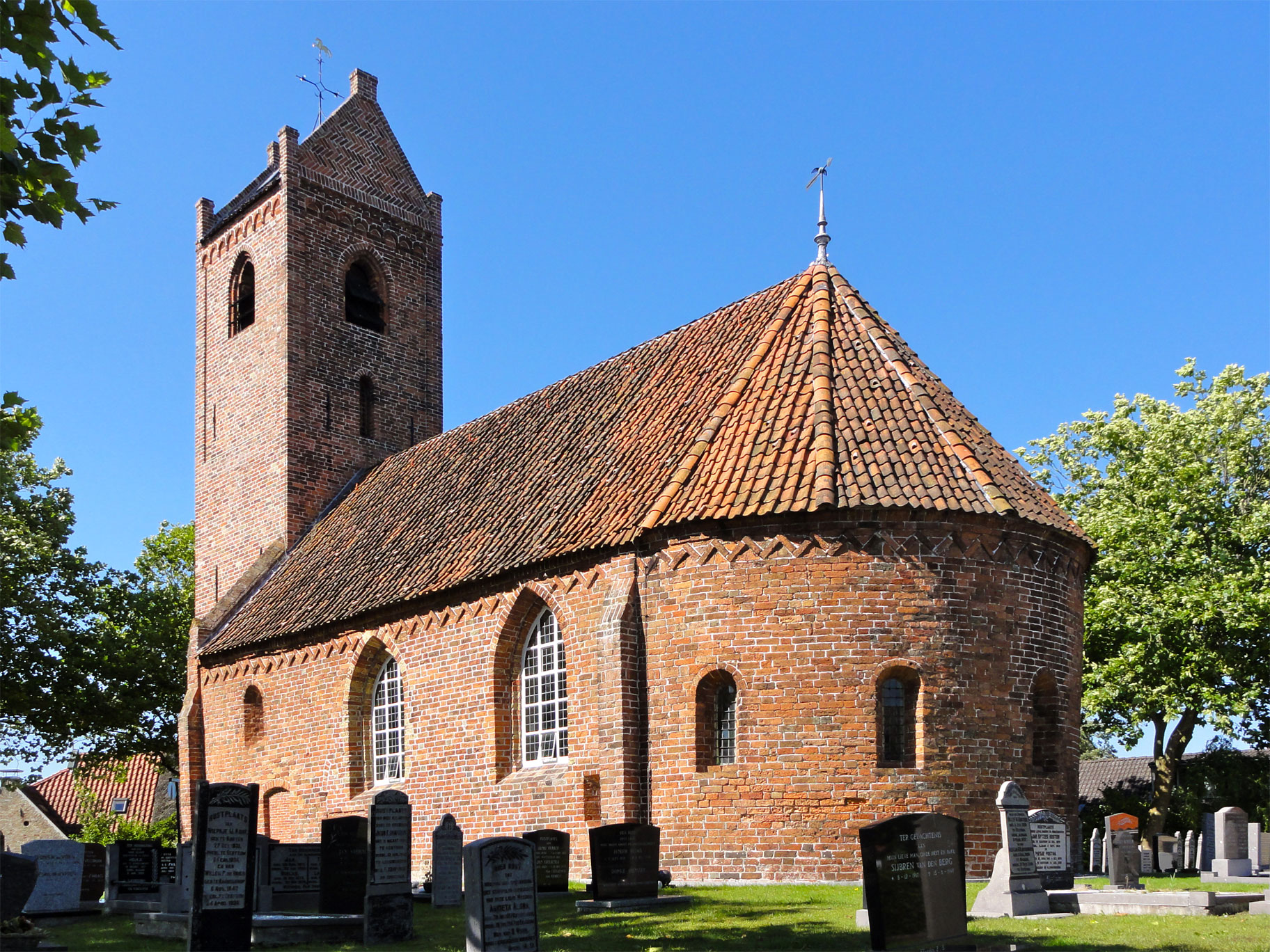
Exterior.

The Protestant church of Jistrum or Saint Peter's church is a medieval religious building in Jistrum, Friesland, Netherlands. It is a well preserved and complete 13th century Romanesque church built of red brick, located in the center of the village on Schoolstraat 2. The church is listed as a Rijksmonument, number 35645.

== History ==
The Romanesque church was built in the 13th century, the tower is a little older and dates from c. 1230. The church was once a Roman Catholic church dedicated to Saint Peter but was stripped of the Saints statues and painted/decorated walls in one week in 1581 during the Protestant Reformation and became a Protestant church.

== Interior and exterior ==
The nave and the semicircular choir date from the 13th century, while the tower dates from around 1230. The church has a gabled roof. On the corners of the nave is a buttress in brickwork, the outer walls are on the upper side decorated with so called keper friezen. The north wall has two Romanesque windows located in the higher zone of the wall, and the lower zone has two closed entrances with brick. The southern wall shows a similar layout but has two large lancet windows build in it, with one small Romanesque window at the tower side. The choir has five regular placed Romanesque windows and the nave is covered with a Romanesque-Gothic domevault. In each bay eight ribs come together in a ring. In the west bay the ribs are squire shaped. During a renovation two hagioscopes were discovered and restored. These windows are also known as leprozenruitjes (windows for people with leprosy).

The wooden pulpit from the third quarter of the 17th century is located against the north wall where the choir and bay meet.

Most of the Frisian churches have a golden rooster as weather vane, but on the 20.5 meters high tower of the church a horse is seen. The golden rooster is a symbol of Jesus Christ who breaks the power of the darkness, forgives sins and calls for a new day. The tower had also a rooster in the past, but it was blown of by the wind and could not be repaired. It was then replaced by a horse because it was cheaper. Apparently the price was more important than the symbolic value.

The original bell in the tower from 1759 was stolen by the Germans during World War II, the current bell dating from 1949. In 2007, the renovation of the church started and the monumental Pipe organ from the other church in town was installed.
