= De Hersteller, Sintjohannesga =

Smock mill in Friesland, Netherlands

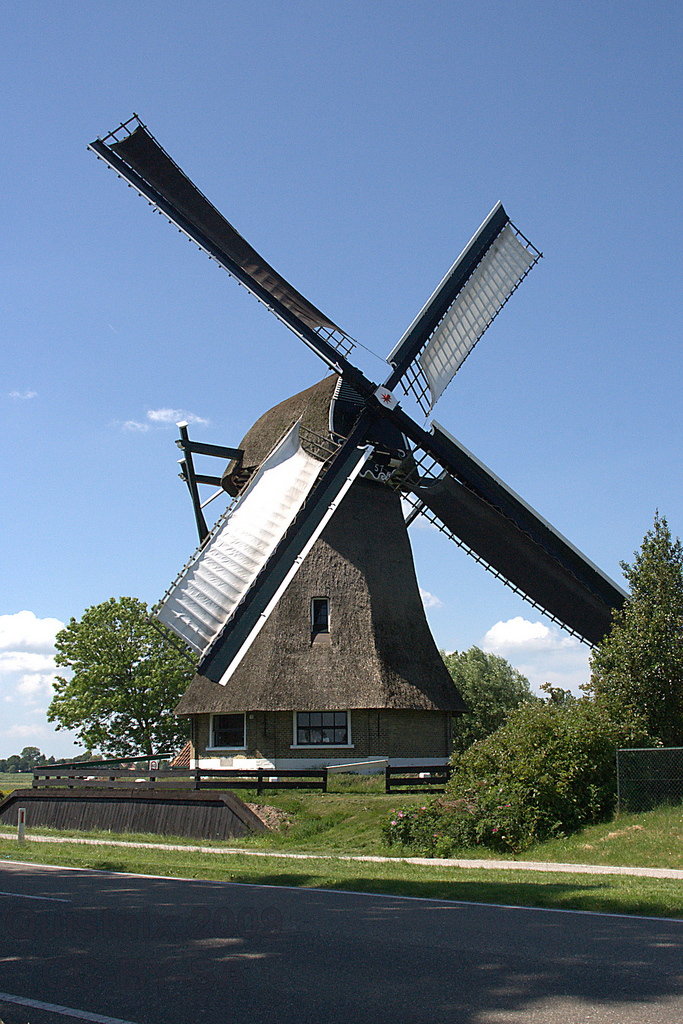
- De Hersteller, May 2009.

Origin
- Mill name: De Hersteller
- Mill location: Hogedijk 132, 8464 NZ, Sintjohannesga
- Coordinates: 52°56′50″N 5°46′40″E
- Operator(s): Molenstichting De Hersteller
- Year built: 1857

Information
- Purpose: Drainage mill
- Type: Smock mill
- Storeys: Two storey smock
- Base storeys: One storey base
- Smock sides: Eight sides
- No. of sails: Four sails
- Type of sails: Common sails, Fauël system on leading edges
- Windshaft: Cast iron
- Winding: Tailpole and winch
- Type of pump: Archimedes screw

De Hersteller (English: The Maintainer) is a smock mill in Sintjohannesga, Friesland, Netherlands which was built in 1857. The mill has been converted to residential use but can turn in the wind. It is listed as a Rijksmonument.

== History ==
De Hersteller was built in 1857. It was one of six mills that drained the Sintjohannesgaaster Veenpolder. The miller's living accommodation was built into the mill when it was constructed. The mill worked until Christmas 1930. The cap and sails were removed before the start of World War II, having been purchased by millwright K J Westra of Franeker, Friesland for ƒ500. It was proposed to demolish the remaining smock in 1948, but this plan was cancelled. De Hersteller was restored in 1980-81 by millwright J D Wal of Grou, Friesland. The restored mill was officially reopened on 19 October 1981. The mill is listed as a Rijksmonument, No.359671.

== Description ==
De Hersteller is what the Dutch describe as a Grondzeiler. It is a two-storey smock mill on a single storey base. There is no stage, the sails reaching almost to ground level. The mill is winded by tailpole and winch. The smock and cap are thatched. The sails are Common sails, with the Fauël system fitted to the leading edges. They have a span of 21.52 metres (70 ft 7 in). The sails are carried on a cast iron windshaft, which was cast by the Nijmeegse IJzergieterij, Nijmegen, Gelderland in 1981. The windshaft carries the brake wheel which has 65 cogs. This drives the wallower (33 cogs) at the top of the upright shaft. No other machinery remains.

== Public access ==
De Hersteller is open to the public by appointment.
