= Fatum, Tzum =

Windmill in Tzum, Netherlands

Fatum
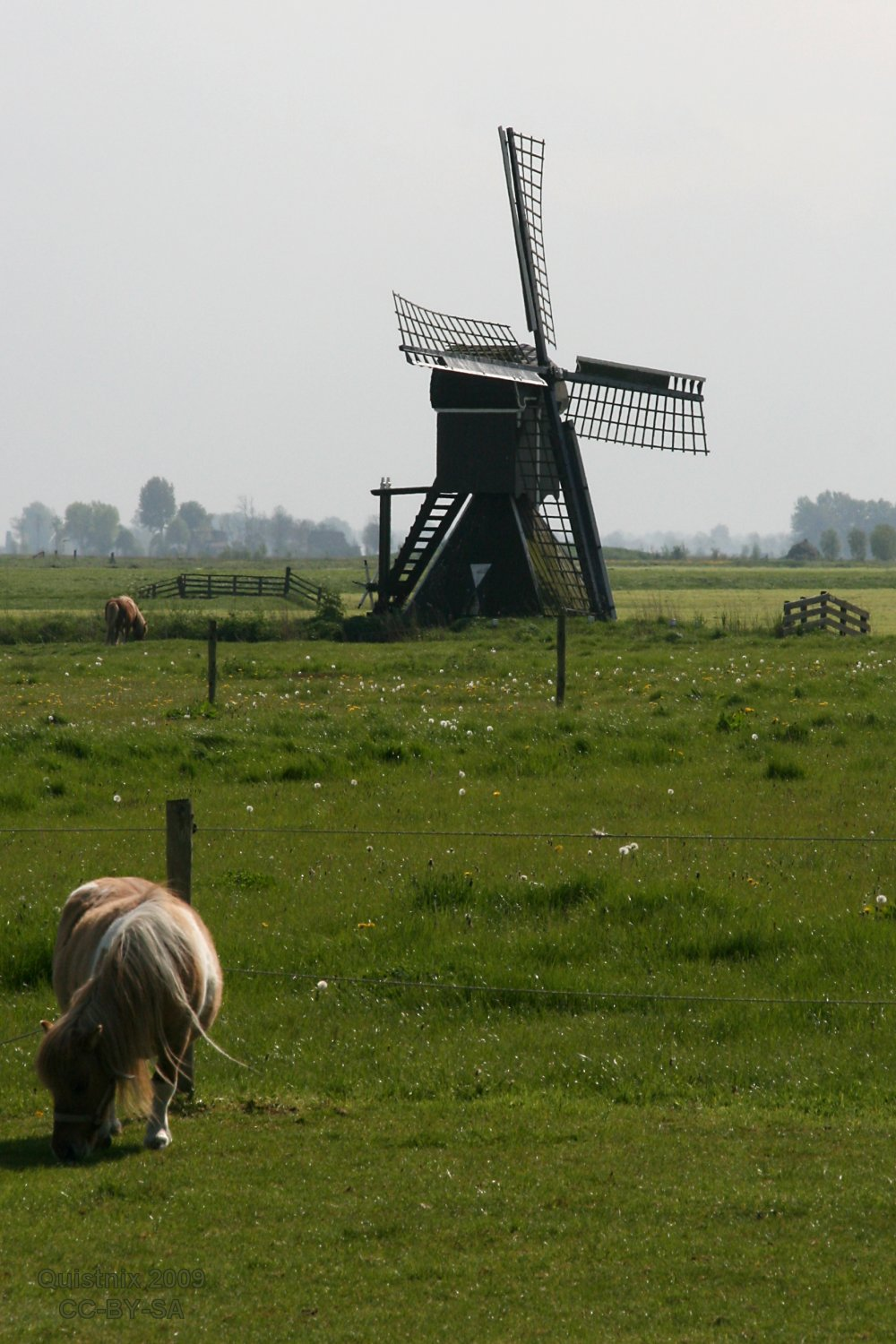
- Spinnenkop Fatum
- Interactive map of Fatum

Origin
- Mill name: Fatum
- Mill location: Tzum
- Coordinates: 53°8′28″N 5°34′34″E
- Operator: Gemeente Franekeradeel
- Year built: 18th century/1914

Information
- Purpose: Drainage mill
- Type: Hollow post
- Roundhouse storeys: Single storey roundhouse
- No. of sails: Four sails
- Type of sails: Common sails
- Windshaft: Cast iron
- Winding: Tailpole and winch
- Type of pump: Archimedes' screw

Fatum is a drainage mill near the village of Tzum, Friesland, Netherlands. It is located in the eponymous hamlet of Fatum. It is a hollow post windmill of the type called "spinnenkop" by the Dutch. The mill is listed as a Rijksmonument, number 15876 and is in working order though it can no longer be used for drainage.

== History ==
The substructure probably dates from the 18th century and still carries traces of the damage caused when it caught fire during storms in 1914 and 1915, after which the mill was rebuilt. A merger of several polders around Tzum that was proposed in 1910 would have left the mill without function and threatened its survival, however the plans were called off in 1924. At some time in the second half of the 20th century the stocks were fitted with patent sails. These were replaced by common sails when the mill was restored in 1969 by millwright De Roos, though the Fauël leading edge on one stock was retained. During the restoration in 1989 amongst others the stocks and windshaft were replaced.

== Description ==
Fatum is what the Dutch describe as a "spinnenkop" (English: spiderhead mill). It is a small hollow post mill winded by a winch. The mill has common sails. The outer stock has a span of 11.60 metres (38 ft 1 in) and is fitted with Fauël system leading edges, while the inner stock has a span of 11.46 metres (37 ft 7 in). The steel stocks are carried on a cast-iron windshaft cast by Gieterij Hardinxveld as number 30 in 1989. The brake wheel on the windshaft drives the wallower at the top of the upright shaft in the body (called head on a spinnenkop), which passes through the main post into the substructure. At the bottom of the upright shaft is the crown wheel which drives the wooden Archimedes' screw. The body (called head on a spinnenkop) and substructure are weatherboarded.

== Public access ==
The mill is open to the public by appointment.
