= Easterein =

Oosterend Easterein
- Village
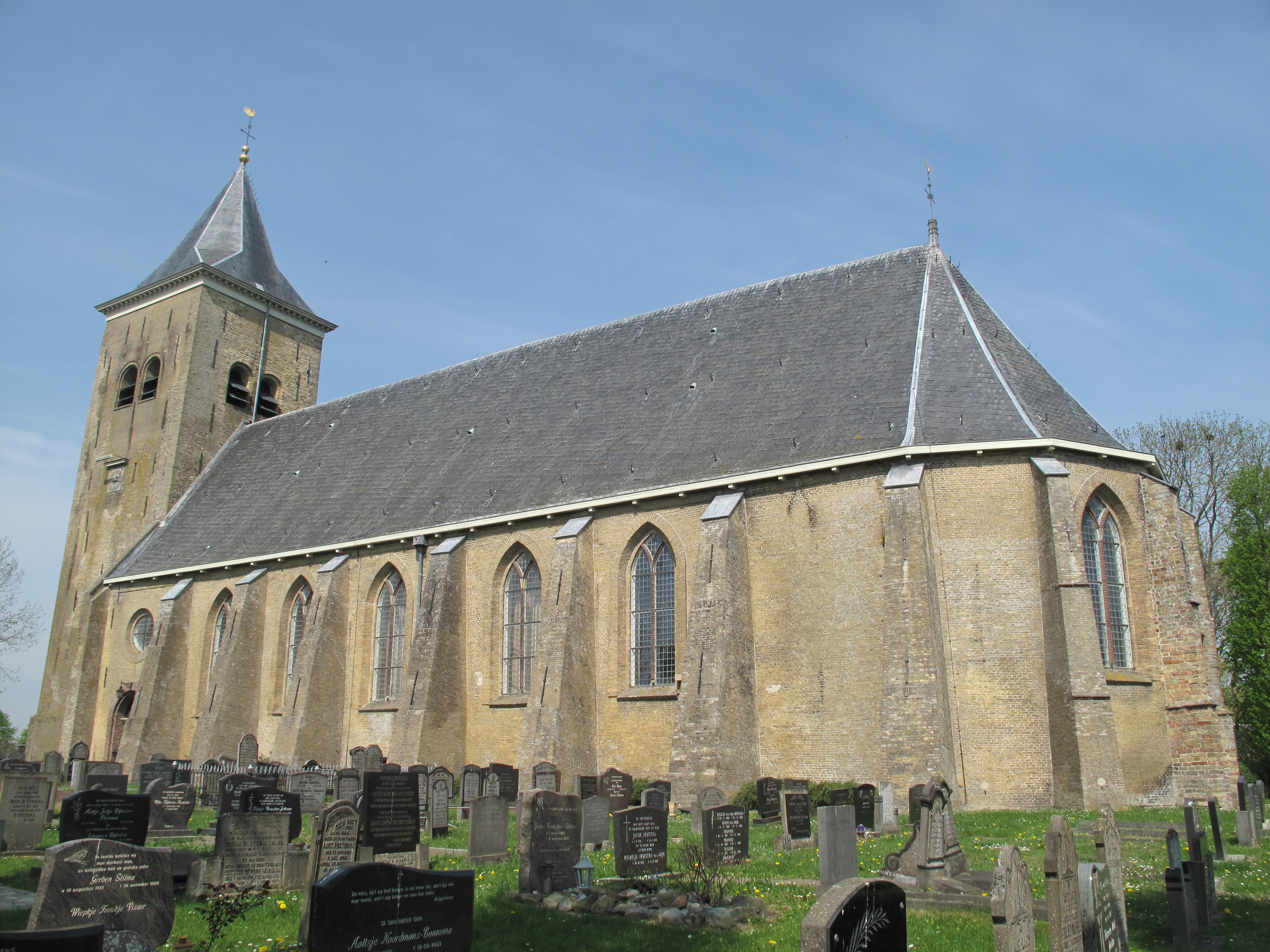
- Easterein, church: Martinikerk

- Flag Coat of arms

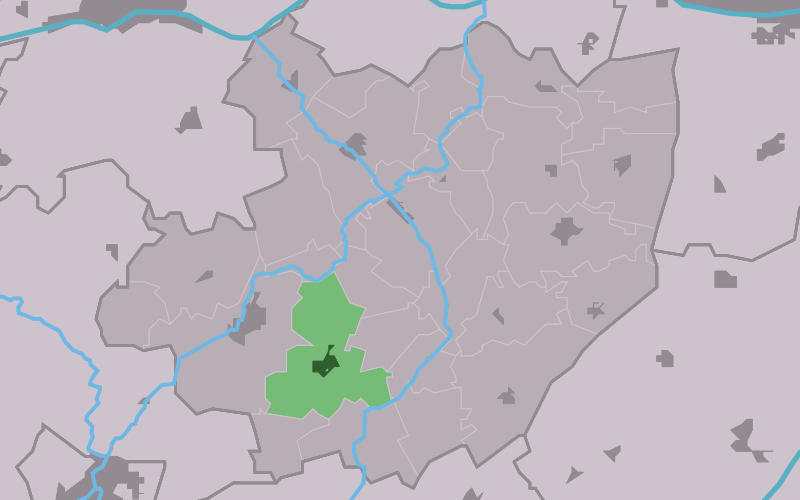
- Location in Littenseradiel municipality

- Location in the Netherlands Oosterend (Netherlands)
- Country: Netherlands
- Province: Friesland
- Municipality: Súdwest-Fryslân

Area
  - Total: 7.88 km^{2} (3.04 sq mi)
- Elevation: 0.1 m (0.33 ft)

Population (2021)
  - Total: 935
  - Density: 119/km^{2} (307/sq mi)
- Time zone: UTC+1 (CET)
  - Summer (DST): UTC+2 (CEST)
- Postal code: 8734
- Dialing code: 0515
- Website: Official

Easterein (Dutch: Oosterend) is a village in the municipality Súdwest-Fryslân in the province of Friesland, the Netherlands. It is southeast of Wommels and southwest of Itens, in the middle of Bolsward, Sneek, Leeuwarden and Franeker. The center is situated on the Oosterendervaart, which connects the Wijnsevaart and the Hidaardervaart with each other.

In 2019 the village had 970 residents. The village also includes the hamlets Driehuizen (uninhabited part) Meilahuizen and Schrok. Until 1955 Roodhuis was also part of Oosterend.

== History ==
The age of the village is unclear, it may have originated when the island on which it was situated, also referred to as Oosterend, had been diked. This was the earliest dike. It is also thought that it was created on a mound before that, but the village itself had several elevations, whether or not they were raised.

Various surrounding villages lay within the island, such as Hennaard, Itens and Lutkewierum. The village became the most important village after the establishment of theGrietenij of Hennaarderadeel. Wommels later took over this position.

In 1378 the place was mentioned as to Aestereynde, in 1402 as to Aesterende, in 1433 as in Oestereynde and in 1505 as Oestereynd. The place name indicates that it was located at the eastern (Oudfries: Aester) end (eynde) of something. In 1991 the official name was changed to Frisian-language Easterein.

Until the municipal reorganization in 1984, Oosterend was part of the municipality of Hennaarderadeel. After this it was part of the municipality of Littenseradiel. Since 1 January 2018, the village belongs to the municipality of Súdwest-Fryslân.

== Gallery ==
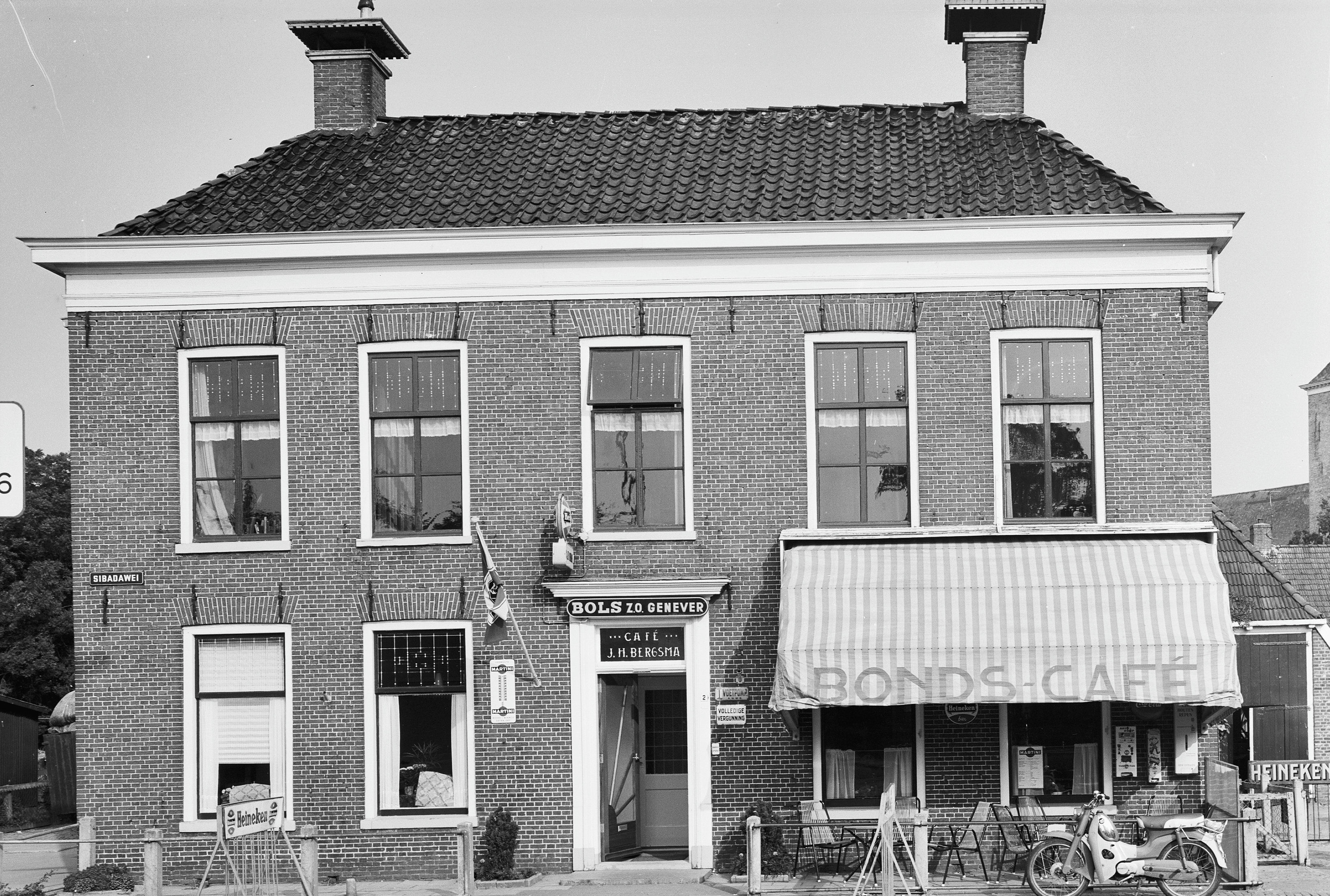
Pub in Easterein

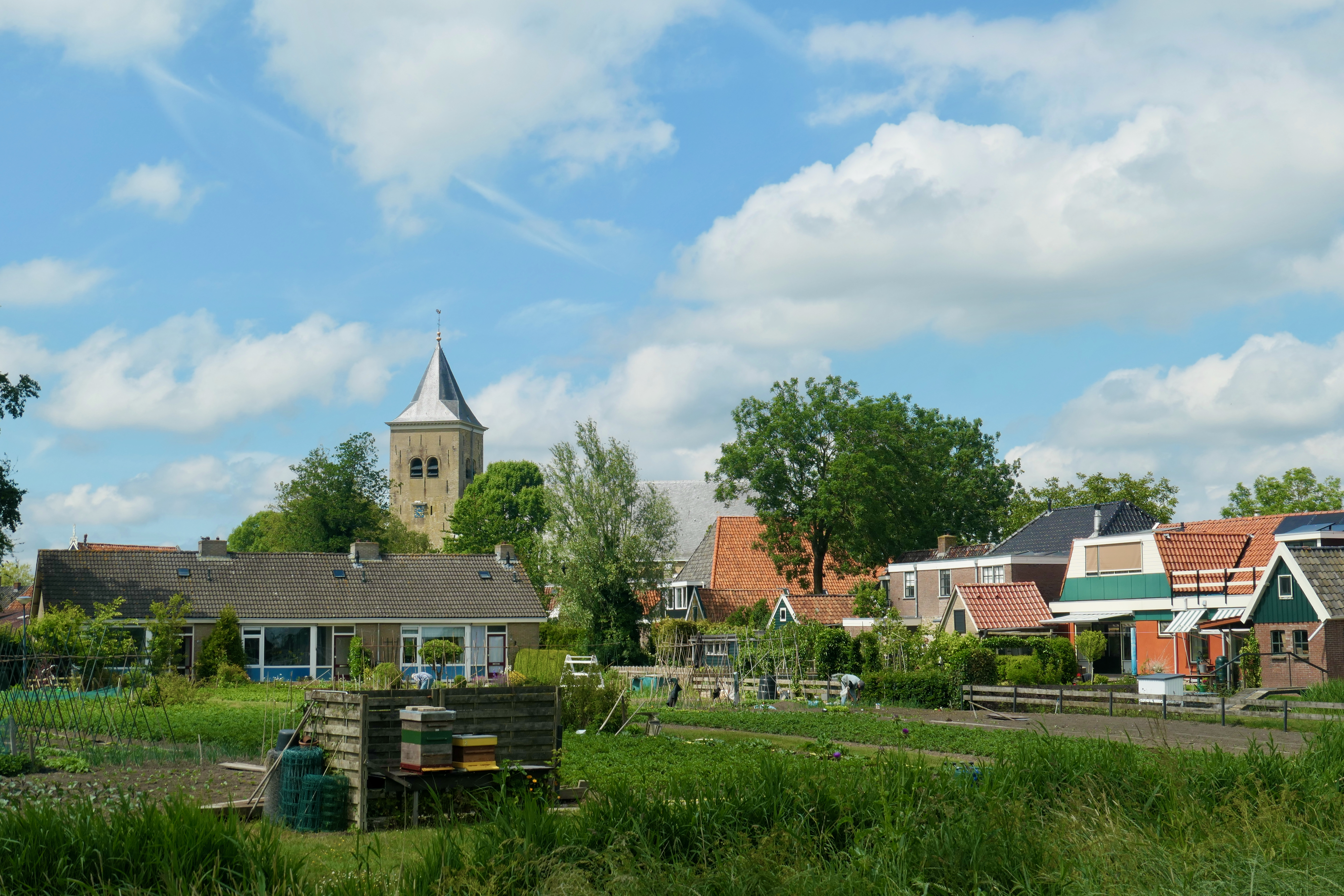
View on Easterein

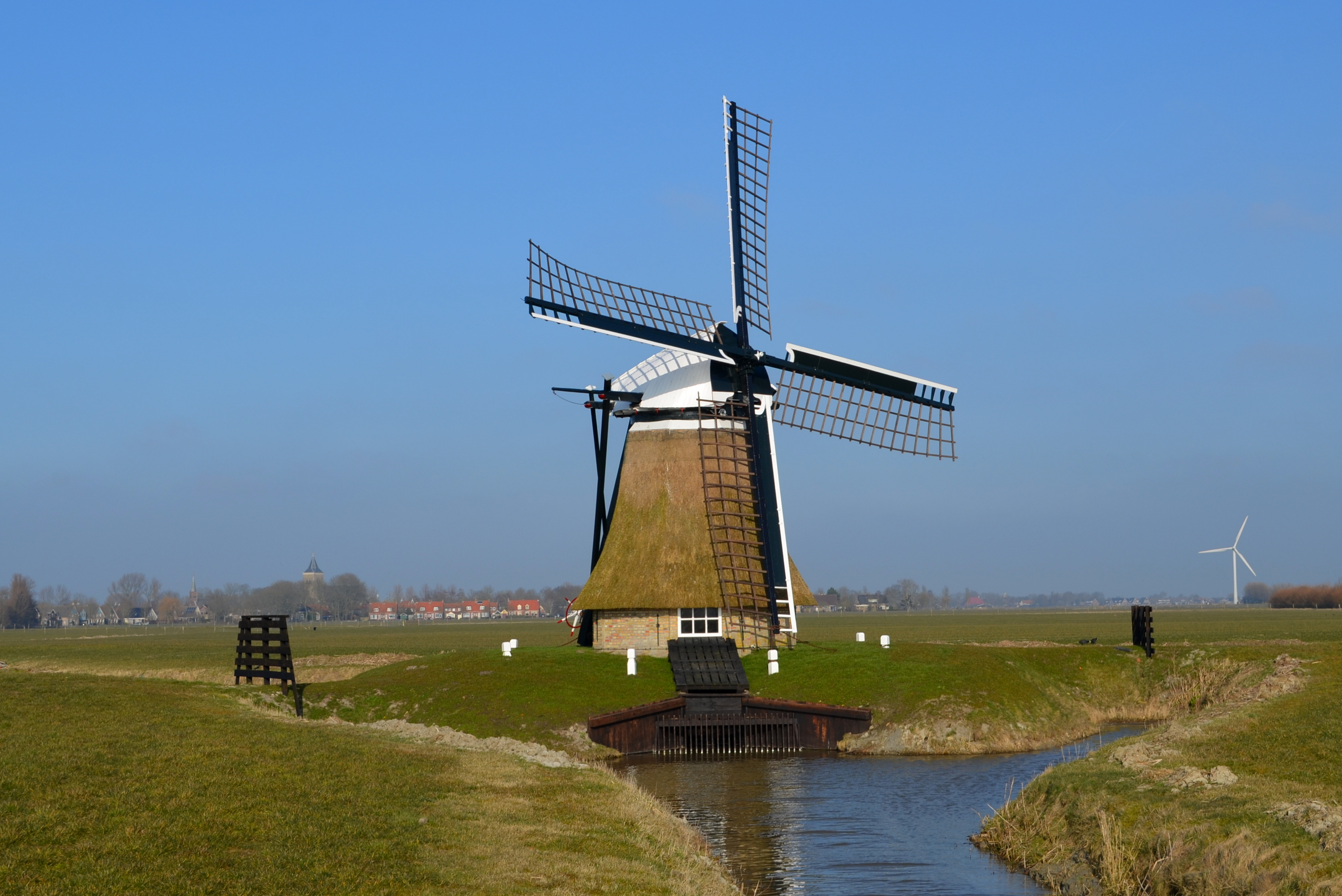
Wind mill

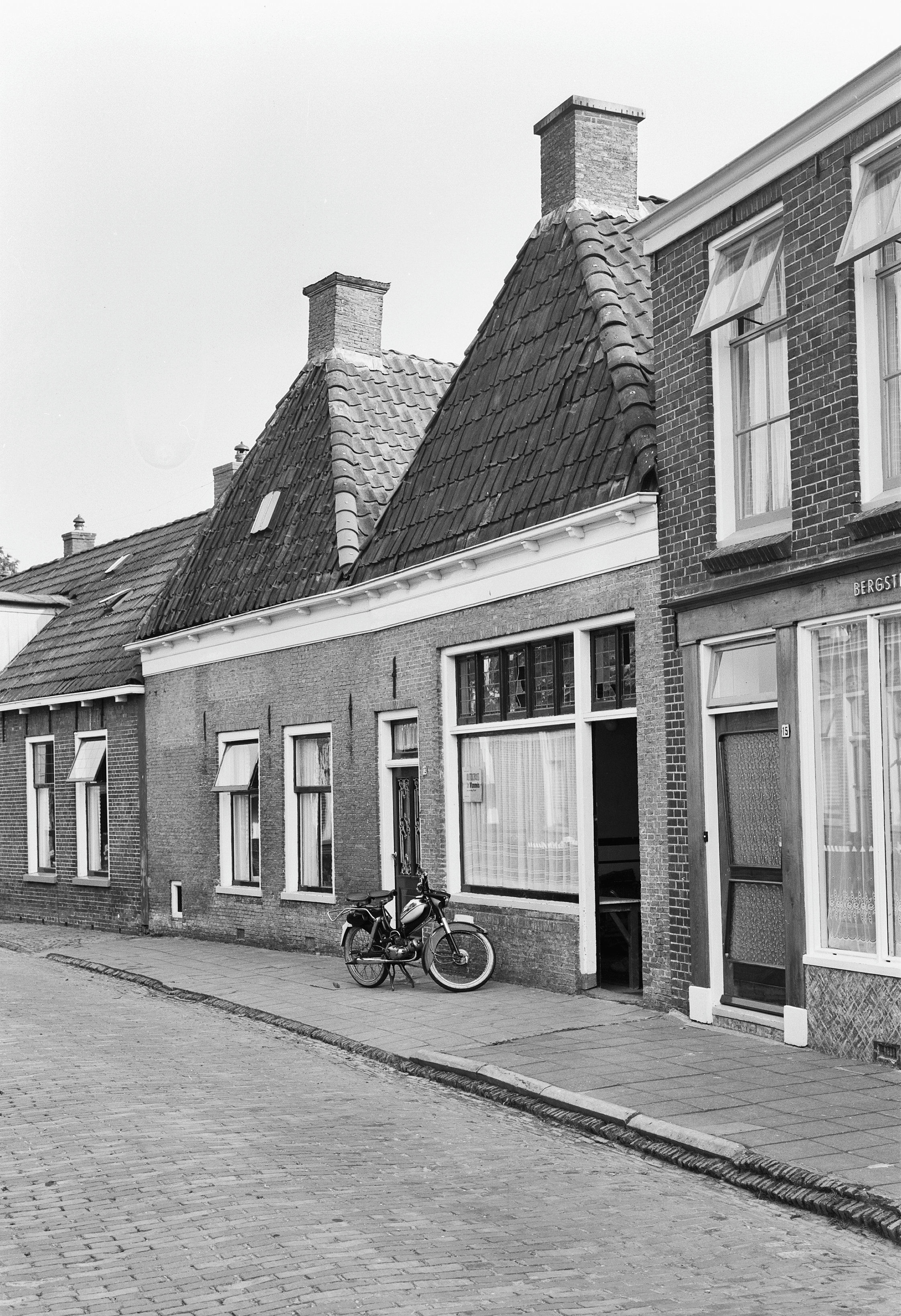
Street view (1967)
