= List of windmills in Friesland (E–G) =

List of windmills in Friesland, Netherlands

A list of windmills in the Dutch province of Friesland, locations beginning E–G.

== E ==
| Location | Name of mill | Type | Built | Notes | Photograph |
|---|---|---|---|---|---|
| Earnewâld | De Princehofmolen; 53°07′20″N 5°54′38″E | Spinnenkop | 1958 | | |
| Earnewâld | Molen van Age van der Zee; 53°08′23″N 5°55′29″E | Spinnenkopmolen | Before 1832 | Demolished before 1850. | |
| Earnewâld | Molen van de Gerefoormeerde Kerk; 53°07′49″N 5°56′04″E | Spinnenkopmolen | Before 1832 | Demolished before 1850. | |
| Earnewâld | Molen van de Pastorij; 53°08′01″N 5°56′20″E | Spinnenkopmolen | Before 1832 | Demolished before 1850. | |
| Earnewâld | Molen van Johannes Feenstra; 53°08′21″N 5°55′59″E | Spinnenkopmolen | Before 1832 | Demolished before 1850. | |
| Earnewâld | Molen van Lykle Haersma; 53°08′12″N 5°56′56″E | Spinnenkopmolen | Before 1832 | Demolished before 1850. | |
| Earnewâld | Molen van Rienk van Keimpema; 53°08′46″N 5°56′39″E | | Before 1832 | Demolished before 1850. | |
| Earnewâld | Polder 191; 53°07′44″N 5°55′58″E | | Before 1876 | Demolished before 1924. | |
| Earnewâld | Polder 192; 53°07′52″N 5°56′29″E | Spinnenkopmolen | 1876 | Demolished before 1920. | |
| Earnewâld | Polder 193; 53°08′01″N 5°56′32″E | Spinnenkopmolen | Before 1832 | Demolished post-1876. | |
| Earnewâld | Polder 194; 53°08′02″N 5°56′57″E | | Before 1876 | Demolished post-1924. | |
| Easterein | Rispens | Grondzeiler | 1821 | Moved within Easterein 1994. | |
| Easterein | Rispenserpoldermolen; 53°05′21″N 5°36′26″E | Grondzeiler | 1994 | | |
| Easterein | Molen van Aurelius de Gavere; 53°05′57″N 5°36′54″E | Spinnenkopmolen | Before 1832 | Demolished before 1830. | |
| Easterein | Molen van de Gereformeerde Kerk; 53°05′36″N 5°37′57″E | Spinnenkopmolen | Before 1832 | Demolished post-1850. | |
| Easterein | Polder 6? 53°06′31″N 5°37′16″E | Spinnenkopmolen | Before 1832 | Demolished between 1850 and 1929. | |
| Easterein | Polder 332; 53°05′01″N 5°37′31″E | Grondzeiler | Before 1832 | Demolished post-1930. | |
| Easterein | Polder 333; 53°05′01″N 5°37′10″E | Spinnenkopmolen | Before 1832 | Demolished post-1930. | |
| Easterein | Polder 334; 53°05′29″N 5°37′04″E | | Before 1832 | Demolished post-1850. | |
| Easterein | Polder 334a 53°05′25″N 5°37′37″E | Spinnenkopmolen | Before 1832 | Demolished before 1929. | |
| Easterein | Polder 334b 53°05′31″N 5°36′51″E | Spinnenkopmolen | Before 1832 | Demolished post-1850. | |
| Easterein | Polder 335; 53°05′25″N 5°37′46″E | Grondzeiler | Before 1930 | Demolished before 1952. | |
| Easterein | Polder 336; Molen van Hania Zathe; 53°05′11″N 5°37′41″E | Spinnenkopmolen | Before 1597 | Demolished before 1928. | |
| Easterein | Polder 337; 53°05′18″N 5°38′14″E | Spinnenkopmolen | Before 1832 | Demolished post-1949. | |
| Easterein | Polder 337a 53°05′34″N 5°38′09″E | Spinnenkopmolen | Before 1832 | Demolished post-1850. | |
| Easterein | Polder 340; 53°05′43″N 5°38′16″E | Spinnenkopmolen | Before 1832 | Demolished before 1929. | |
| Easterein | Polder 353; 53°06′42″N 5°37′18″E | Spinnenkopmolen | Before 1832 | Demolished between 1943 and 1952. | |
| Easterein | Polder 354; Polder Sibada; 53°06′48″N 5°37′03″E | Grondzeiler | 1832 | Demolished between 1957 and 1971. | |
| Easterein | Polder 360; Jellema State; 53°05′48″N 5°34′04″E | Grondzeiler | | Demolished 1950. | |
| Easterein | Polder 361a 53°06′01″N 5°37′38″E | Spinnenkopmolen | Before 1832 | Demolished post-1850. | |
| Easterein | Polder 363; 53°05′51″N 5°36′48″E | Grondzeiler | Before 1832 | Demolished between 1952 and 1957. | |
| Easterein | Polder 369; 53°05′32″N 5°36′06″E | Grondzeiler | Before 1832 | Demolished post-1930. | |
| Easterein | Molen van Ide Sjaarda; 53°54′33″N 5°37′46″E | Spinnenkopmolen | Before 1832 | | |
| Easterein | Molen van Jitte van der Meer; 53°05′48″N 5°38′04″E | Spinnenkopmolen | Before 1832 | | |
| Easterein | Molen van Ruurd de Vries; 53°05′15″N 5°38′08″E | Spinnenkopmolen | Before 1832 | Demolished post-1850. | |
| Easterein | Molen van Tiede IJpema; 53°06′16″N 5°37′04″E | Spinnenkopmolen | Before 1832 | | |
| Easterein | Molen van Tiede IJpema; 53°06′10″N 5°36′50″E | | Before 1832 | Demolished before 1850. | |
| Easterein | Polde De Witte Molen; De Witkop; 53°06′16″N 5°37′04″E | Grondzeiler | | Demolished before 1952. | |
| Easterein | Wittemolenpolder; 53°06′21″N 5°36′51″E | Spinnenkopmolen | Before 1832 | Demolished post-1850. | |
| Easterlittens | Alde Swarte Molen; Wieuwiens Molen; 53°07′46″N 5°39′24″E | Spinnenkop | 1690 | | |
| Easterlittens | De Zilveren Roos; Sulveren Roas | Iron windpump | | Molendatabase (in Dutch); De Hollandsche Molen (in Dutch) | |
| Easterlittens | De Geregtigheid; 53°08′02″N 5°38′51″E | Stellingmolen | 1750 | Demolished 1894. | |
| Easterlittens | Molen van Ansta State; 53°07′29″N 5°39′45″E | Weidemolen | Before 1832 | Demolished c.1876. | |
| Easterlittens | Molen van De Gavere; 53°08′02″N 5°38′10″E | Weidemolen | 1900 | Demolished c.1930. | |
| Easterlittens | Molen van de Kosterijplaats; 53°08′17″N 5°39′00″E | Spinnenkopmolen | Before 1832 | Demolished 1913/14. | |
| Easterlittens | Molen van Kuipers; 53°07′35″N 5°37′43″E | Spinnenkopmolen | Before 1810 | Demolished between 1914 and 1928. | |
| Easterlittens | Molen van Strikwerda c.s. 53°08′36″N 5°39′15″E | | Before 1832 | Demolished between 1909 and 1914. | |
| Easterlittens | Molen van Van der Meulen; 53°07′48″N 5°40′36″E | Weidemolen | Before 1832 | Demolished 1886. | |
| Easterlittens | Molen van Van Wageningen; 53°07′12″N 5°39′32″E | Weidemolen | Before 1827 | Demolished before 1876. | |
| Easterlittens | Molen van Wybranda State; 53°07′40″N 5°40′17″E | Weidemolen | Before 1832 | Demolished 1883. | |
| Easterlittens | Molen van Wybranda State; 53°07′58″N 5°40′39″E | Weidemolen | Before 1832 | Demolished 1883. | |
| Easterlittens | Op Hoop; 53°07′36″N 5°38′47″E | Stellingmolen | 1836 | Burnt down 1868. | |
| Easterlittens | Polder 63; 53°08′11″N 5°38′49″E | Spinnenkopmolen | Before 1832 | Demolished 1919. | |
| Easterlittens | Polder 64; 53°08′21″N 5°38′29″E | Grondzeiler | Before 1832 | Demolished 1930. | |
| Easterlittens | Polder 65; 53°08′17″N 5°38′00″E | Grondzeiler | Between 1832 and 1855 | Demolished 1945. | |
| Easterlittens | Polder 65a 53°08′02″N 5°37′58″E | | Before 1873 | Demolished before 1928. | |
| Easterlittens | Polder 67; 53°07′51″N 5°38′36″E | Spinnenkopmolen | Before 1832 | Demolished 1924. | |
| Easterlittens | Polder 68; Polder Abbema; 53°07′32″N 5°38′39″E | Spinnenkopmolen | Between 1731 and 1756 | Demolished 1960, base demolished between 1970 and 1987. | |
| Easterlittens | Polder 69; 53°07′54″N 5°38′27″E | Spinnenkopmolen | Before 1832 | Demolished 1928. | |
| Easterlittens | Polder 70; 53°07′48″N 5°37′47″E | Grondzeiler | 1810 | Demolished 1927. | |
| Easterlittens | Polder 71; 53°07′31″N 5°38′09″E | | Before 1832 | Demolished between 1875 and 1887. | |
| Easterlittens | Polder 74; 53°07′23″N 5°38′45″E | | Before 1832 | Demolished 1887. | |
| Easterlittens | Polder 74; Molen van Bouma; 53°07′30″N 5°38′34″E | Grondzeiler | 1880 | Blown down 1972. | |
| Easterlittens | Polder 76; 53°07′15″N 5°39′19″E | Spinnenkopmolen | Before 1832 | Demolished between 1914 and 1918. | |
| Easterlittens | Polder 77; 53°07′02″N 5°38′59″E | Grondzeiler | Before 1831 | Demolished 1934. | |
| Easterlittens | Polder 78; 53°07′56″N 5°38′53″E | | 1850 | Demolished before 1928. | |
| Easterlittens | Polder 82; Molen van Everarda State; 53°07′22″N 5°39′55″E | Spinnenkopmolen | Before 1832 | Demolished 1934. | |
| Easterlittens | Polder 83; 53°07′37″N 5°40′18″E | Grondzeiler | Before 1832 | Demolished 1921. | |
| Easterlittens | Polder 84; Molen van Everarda State; 53°07′48″N 5°39′37″E | Spinnenkopmolen | Between 1832 and 1844 | Demolished 1922. | |
| Easterlittens | Polder 85; 53°07′57″N 5°39′27″E | Spinnenkopmolen | 1829 | Demolished 1921. | |
| Easterlittens | Polder 86; Molen van de Pastorieplaats; 53°08′21″N 5°39′10″E | Spinnenkopmolen | 1800 | Demolished 1922. | |
| Easterlittens | Polder 90; 53°08′32″N 5°39′07″E | | 1800 | Demolished post-1914. | |
| Easterlittens | Polder 91; 53°08′30″N 5°38′42″E | Spinnenkopmolen | Between 1909 and 1914 | Demolished 1940. | |
| Easterlittens | Polder 91a 53°08′23″N 5°38′52″E | Spinnenkopmolen | Before 1832 | Demolished between 1909 and 1914. | |
| Eastermar | 53°10′25″N 6°03′17″E | Stellingmolen | 1848 | Storm damaged 1911, subsequently demolished. | |
| Eastermar | Korenmolen van Oostermeer; 53°10′25″N 6°03′17″E | Standerdmolen | Before 1718 | Demolished 1848. | |
| Eastermar | Molen van Jan Benedictus; 53°09′42″N 6°05′12″E | | Before 1832 | Demolished post-1919. | |
| Eastermar | Molen van Wijtze Douma; 53°10′38″N 6°03′11″E | | Before 1832 | Demolished post-1850. | |
| Eastermar | Polder 177; Polder Antonides; 53°10′32″N 6°03′07″E | Grondzeiler | Between 1854 and 1874 | Demolished 1936. | |
| Eastermar | Polder 178; 53°10′17″N 6°03′19″E | Grondzeiler | Before 1854 | Demolished 1928. | |
| Eastermar | 53°09′52″N 6°05′23″E | Weidemolen | Before 1919 | Demolished post-1932. | |
| Eastermar | Polder Nieuw-Veen; Von Bismarc; 53°09′43″N 6°04′42″E | Grondzeiler | 1866 | Demolished 1948. | |
| Easternijtsjerk | 53°22′24″N 6°03′02″E | Stellingmolen | 1872 | Burnt down 1893. | |
| Easterwierrum | Kleiterpstermolen | Iron windpump | 1918 | Molendatabase (in Dutch); De Hollandsche Molen (in Dutch) | |
| Easterwierrum | De Goede Verwachting; 53°06′25″N 5°44′15″E | Stellingmolen | 1860 | Burnt down 1914. | |
| Easterwierrum | Korenmolen van Oosterwierum; 53°06′37″N 5°43′59″E | Standerdmolen | Before 1537 | Demolished 1758. | |
| Easterwierrum | Molen van Gerard van Wageningen; 53°06′11″N 5°43′38″E | | Before 1832 | Demolished before 1850. | |
| Easterwierrum | Polder 105; 53°06′57″N 5°43′28″E | | Before 1832 | Demolished before 1928. | |
| Easterwierrum | Polder 124; 53°06′47″N 5°44′39″E | | Before 1832 | Demolished before 1929. | |
| Easterwierrum | Polder 125; 53°06′47″N 5°44′30″E | | Before 1832 | Demolished before 1929. | |
| Easterwierrum | Polder 126; 53°06′31″N 5°44′29″E | | Before 1832 | Demolished before 1929. | |
| Easterwierrum | Polder 223; 53°06′17″N 5°43′45″E | | Before 1832 | Demolished before 1929. | |
| Easterwierrum | Polder 224; 53°06′12″N 5°43′48″E | | Before 1832 | Demolished before 1929. | |
| Easterwierrum | Polder 225; 53°06′51″N 5°43′25″E | | Before 1832 | Demolished before 1929. | |
| Easterwierrum | Polder 226; 53°06′44″N 5°43′08″E | | Before 1832 | Demolished before 1929. | |
| Echten | Molen van A. A. van Andringa de Kempenaer; 52.87064°N 5.82985°E | | Before 1832 | Demolished post-1850. | |
| Echten | Molen van Jacob Oord; 52.87672°N 5.79663°E | Spinnenkop | Before 1832 | Demolished before 1930. | |
| Echten | Polder 33; 52.86043°N 5.79079°E | | 1877 | Demolished before 1932. | |
| Echten | Polder 34; 52.86928°N 5.79858°E | | Before 1877 | Demolished before 1929. | |
| Echten | Polder 34a 52.87201°N 5.79884°E | | Before 1832 | Demolished before 1929, | |
| Echten | Polder 40; 52.86104°N 5.79238°E | | Before 1877 | Demolished before 1929. | |
| Echten | Polder 41; 52.85730°N 5.80176°E | | Before 1877 | Demolished before 1929. | |
| Echten | Polder 42; 52.85555°N 5.80114°E | | Before 1877 | Demolished before 1929. | |
| Echten | Veenpoldermolen; Molen Ì 52.85575°N 5.79980°E | Weidemolen | 1877 | Demolished before 1932. | |
| Echtenerbrug | Polder 35; 52.87257°N 5.08110°E | | 1877 | Demolished before 1929. | |
| Echtenerbrug | Polder 36; 52.86940°N 5.81907°E | | Before 1877 | Demolished before 1929. | |
| Echtenerbrug | Polder 37; 52.86733°N 5.82055°E | | Before 1877 | Demolished before 1929. | |
| Echtenerbrug | Polder 37a 52.86645°N 5.83146°E | | Before 1877 | Demolished before 1929. | |
| Echtenerbrug | Polder 38; 52.86625°N 5.83164°E | | Before 1832 | Demolished before 1929. | |
| Echtenerbrug | Polder 39; 52.86244°N 5.83096°E | | Before 1877 | Demolished before 1929. | |
| Echtenerbrug | Oud Polder de Grieën; 52.86237°N 5.83828°E | Spinnenkop | Before 1832 | Demolished between 1850 and 1877. | |
| Echtenerbrug | Nieuw Polder de Grieën; 52.86886°N 5.834787°E | | 1863 | Demolished between 1911 and 1915. | |
| Echtenerbrug | Veenpoldermolen; 52.87500°N 5.81726°E | Spinnenkop | Before 1832 | Demolished before 1932. | |
| Echtenerbrug | Molen van A. A. Van Andringa de Kempenaer; 52.86212°N 5.79884°E | Spinnenkop | Before 1832 | Demolished before 1850. | |
| Echtenpolder | Korenmolen van Oldega | Standerdmolen | | Burnt down c.1516. | |
| Echtenpolder | Molen van Albert Huisman; 52°50′22″N 5°48′14″E | Spinnekopmolen | Before 1832 | Demolished before 1850/ | |
| Echtenpolder | Molen van Albert Klijnsma; 52°50′39″N 5°48′36″E | Spinnekopmolen | Before 1832 | Demolished before 1850. | |
| Echtenpolder | Molen van Alte Schippers; 52.°N 5.°E | Spinnekopmolen | Before 1832 | Demolished before 1850. | |
| Echtenpolder | Molen van de Zeven Grietenijen van de Stad Sloten; 52°49′05″N 5°49′06″E | | 1814 | Demolished before 1850. | |
| Echtenpolder | Molen van Evert Kuiper; 52°51′05″N 5°47′03″E | Spinnekopmolen | Before 1832 | Demolished before 1850. | |
| Echtenpolder | Molen van Hendrik van der Groot; 52°50′39″N 5°49′22″E | Spinnekopmolen | Before 1832 | | |
| Echtenpolder | Molen van Jan Gerlsma; 52°51′05″N 5°47′11″E | Spinnekopmolen | Before 1832 | Demolished before 1850. | |
| Echtenpolder | Molen van Jan Mast; 52°50′39″N 5°48′29″E | Spinnekopmolen | Before 1832 | Demolished before 1850. | |
| Echtenpolder | Molen van Jelle Kolk; 52°51′04″N 5°46′51″E | Spinnekopmolen | Before 1832 | Demolished before 1850. | |
| Echtenpolder | Molen van Meine Klijnsma; 52°50′39″N 5°49′12″E | Spinnekopmolen | Before 1832 | Demolished before 1850. | |
| Echtenpolder | Polder 27; 52°51′08″N 5°50′10″E | | Before 1877 | Demolished before 1929. | |
| Echtenpolder | Polder 27A; 52.°N 5.°E | Tjasker | 1877 | Demolished post-1929. | |
| Echtenpolder | Polder 28; 52°50′31″N 5°50′01″E | Spinnekopmolen | Before 1832 | Demolished post-1929. | |
| Echtenpolder | Polder 29; 52°50′00″N 5°49′42″E | | Before 1877 | Demmolished before 1929. | |
| Echtenpolder | Polder 30; 52°49′17″N 5°48′58″E | | Before 1832 | Demolished before 1929. | |
| Echtenpolder | Polder 43; 52°51′05″N 5°47′46″E | | Before 1877 | Demolished before 1929. | |
| Echtenpolder | Polder 44; 52°50′56″N 5°47′49″E | | Before 1877 | Demolished before 1929. | |
| Echtenpolder | Polder 45; 52°51′02″N 5°47′59″E | | Before 1877 | Demolished before 1929. | |
| Echtenpolder | Polder 46; 52°50′59″N 5°48′25″E | Spinnekopmolen | Before 1877 | Demolished before 1929. | |
| Echtenpolder | Polder 47; 52°51′01″N 5°46′26″E | Spinnekopmolen | Before 1832 | c.1929. | |
| Echtenpolder | Polder 47; 52°50′49″N 5°47′19″E | | Before 1877 | Demolished before 1929. | |
| Echtenpolder | Polder 48; 52°50′43″N 5°47′53″E | | Before 1877 | Demolished before 1929. | |
| Echtenpolder | Polder 48a 52°50′33″N 5°47′50″E | | Before 1877 | Demolished before 1932. | |
| Echtenpolder | Polder 49; 52°50′36″N 5°48′02″E | | Before 1877 | Demolished before 1929. | |
| Echtenpolder | Polder 50; 52°50′26″N 5°48′08″E | | Before 1877 | Demolished before 1929. | |
| Echtenpolder | Polder 51; 52°50′18″N 5°49′21″E | | Before 1877 | Demolished before 1929. | |
| Echtenpolder | Polder 52; 52°50′09″N 5°48′01″E | | Before 1877 | Demolished before 1929. | |
| Echtenpolder | Polder 53; 52°50′06″N 5°47′06″E | Spinnekopmolen | Before 1832 | Demolished before 1929. | |
| Echtenpolder | Polder 54; 52°49′52″N 5°48′17″E | | Before 1877 | Demolished before 1929. | |
| Echtenpolder | Polder 55; 52°49′53″N 5°48′38″E | | Before 1877 | Demolished before 1929. | |
| Echtenpolder | Polder 55A; Veenpolder van Echten; 52°49′51″N 5°49′07″E | Grondzeiler | 1873 | Demolished 1915. | |
| Echtenpolder | Polder 56; 52°49′36″N 5°47′07″E | | Before 1877 | Demolished before 1929. | |
| Echtenpolder | Polder Breedschar; 52°50′39″N 5°45′22″E | | Before 1832 | Demolished 1924. | |
| Echtenpolder | Polder Buitendijksveld; 52°49′01″N 5°49′00″E | | Before 1832 | Burnt down 1910. | |
| Echtenpolder | Nieuw Polder 't Echterveld; 52°50′38″N 5°48′50″E | | Before 1877 | Demolished before 1928. | |
| Echtenpolder | Oud Polder 't Echterveld; 52°50′39″N 5°49′04″E | | 1832 | Demolished before 1877. | |
| Echtenpolder | Oud Polder 't Echterveld; 52°50′38″N 5°48′41″E | | 1832 | Demolished before 1877. | |
| Echtenpolder | Veenpolder; 52°51′34″N 5°49′10″E | Weidemolen | 1877 | Demolished before 1932. | |
| Echtenpolder | Veenpolder; 52°51′35″N 5°49′29″E | Weidemolen | 1877 | Demolished before 1932. | |
| Echtenpolder | Veenpolder; 52°51′18″N 5°49′37″E | Spinnekopmolen | Before 1832 | Demolished 1932. | |
| Echtenpolder | Veenpolder; 52°51′15″N 5°49′54″E | Weidemolen | 1877 | Demolished before 1932. | |
| Echtenpolder | Veenpolder; 52°51′14″N 5°50′00″E | Weidemolen | 1877 | Demolished before 1932. | |
| Echtenpolder | Veenpolder; 52°50′53″N 5°46′52″E | Weidemolen | 1877 | Demolished before 1932. | |
| Echtenpolder | Veenpolder; 52°50′26″N 5°47′01″E | Weidemolen | 1877 | Demolished before 1932. | |
| Echtenpolder | Veenpolder; 52°49′52″N 5°47′56″E | Weidemolen | 1877 | Demolished before 1932. | |
| Echtenpolder | Veenpolder; 52°49′53″N 5°48′26″E | Weidemolen | 1877 | Demolished before 1932. | |
| Echtenpolder | Veenpolder; 52°49′51″N 5°48′58″E | Weidemolen | 1877 | Demolished before 1932. | |
| Echtenpolder | Veenpolder; 52°49′36″N 5°48′10″E | Weidemolen | 1877 | Demolished before 1932. | |
| Echtenpolder | Veenpolder van Echten; Kampermolen; 52°50′31″N 5°46′16″E | | Between 1850 and 1879 | Demolished 1915. | |
| Echtenpolder | Veenpolder van Echten; 52°50′10″N 5°48′17″E | Grondzeiler | 1880 | Demolished 1915. | |
| Eemswoude | Polder 2; 53°02′46″N 5°31′01″E | Spinnenkopmolen | Before 1832 | Demolished before 1929. | |
| Eemswoude | Polder 4; 53°02′43″N 5°31′01″E | Spinnenkopmolen | Before 1873 | Demolished post-1928. | |
| Eemswoude | Polder 410; 53°02′57″N 5°31′06″E | Spinnenkopmolen | Before 1832 | Demolished before 1932. | |
| Eemswoude | Polder Eemswoude; 53°02′38″N 5°31′17″E | Grondzeiler | 1722 | Demolished before 1929. | |
| Eesterga | Molen de Wiel; 52°51′37″N 5°43′07″E | | Before 1873 | Demolished before 1929. | |
| Eesterga | Lemsterpolder; Nieuwe Polder van Eestera; 52°51′31″N 5°43′34″E | Grondzeiler | 1832 | Moved to Diever, Drenthe 1882. | |
| Eesterga | Lemsterpolder; Polder de Oude Klaas; Oude Klaas; 52°52′19″N 5°44′35″E | Grondzeiler | Before 1832 | Moved to Oudehorne 1882. | |
| Eesterga | Nieuwe Polder van Eesterga; 52°52′12″N 5°43′06″E | | 1870 | Demolished before 1929. | |
| Eesterga | Tjasker van plas P 52°52′08″N 5°43′25″E | Tjasker | 1873 | Demolished post-1929. | |
| Elahuizen | Elahuisterpoldermolen; 52°56′04″N 5°33′12″E | Spinnenkopmolen | Before 1832 | Demolished before 1929. | |
| Elahuizen | Groot Noordwolderpolder; De Hoop; 52°55′12″N 5°30′54″E | Grondzeiler | 1836 | Burnt down 1850. | |
| Elahuizen | Groot Noordwolderpolder; De Hoop; 52°55′12″N 5°30′54″E | Grondzeiler | 1850 | Demolished 1925. | |
| Elahuizen | Groot Noordwolderpolder; De Voltooiing; 52°55′27″N 5°31′27″E | Grondzeiler | 1868 | Demolished 1925. | |
| Elahuizen | Nijegaster Polder; 52°54′58″N 5°32′42″E | Spinnenkopmolen | Before 1832 | Demolished before 1929. | |
| Elahuizen | Polder 3; 52°55′26″N 5°32′22″E | Spinnenkopmolen | Before 1832 | Demolished before 1929. | |
| Elahuizen | Polder 4; 52°55′11″N 5°33′12″E | | Before 1873 | Demolished before 1929. | |
| Elahuizen | Polder 5; 52°55′38″N 5°32′31″E | Spinnenkopmolen | Before 1832 | Demolished before 1929. | |
| Elahuizen | Polder 6; 52°55′52″N 5°33′00″E | Spinnenkopmolen | Before 1832 | Demolished before 1929. | |
| Elahuizen | Polder 7; 52°55′53″N 5°34′30″E | Spinnenkopmolen | Before 1832 | Demolished 1929. | |
| Elahuizen | Polder 8; 52°56′04″N 5°34′05″E | Spinnenkopmolen | Before 1832 | Demolished before 1929. | |
| Elahuizen | Polder A 52°56′04″N 5°34′36″E | Spinnenkopmolen | Before 1832 | Demolished before 1929. | |
| Elahuizen | 52°55′30″N 5°32′11″E | | Before 1908 | Demolished before 1930. | |
| Elsloo | Vesuvius; Stobbepoel; 52°57′25″N 6°13′58″E | Paaltjasker | 1978 | | |
| Elsloo | name 52°55′32″N 6°14′05″E | | 1885 | Burnt down 1903. | |
| Elsloo | Molen van Bolding; 52°55′32″N 6°14′05″E | Stellingmolen | 1903 | Demolished 1946. | |
| Engwier | Molen van Lambertus IJntema; 53°04′27″N 5°23′44″E | Spinnenkopmolen | Before 1832 | Demolished before 1850. | |
| Engwier | Waterschap de Weeren; Polder 15; De Eenhoorn; 53°04′47″N 5°24′14″E | Spinnenkopmolen | 1778 | Burnt down 1926. | |
| Exmorra | Molen van Douwe Engelo; 53°03′37″N 5°27′51″E | | Before 1832 | Demolished before 1850. | |
| Exmorra | Molen van het Gasthuis Bolsward; 53°03′37″N 5°28′09″E | Spinnenkopmolen | Before 1832 | Demolished 1882. | |
| Exmorra | Polder 27; 53°03′43″N 5°27′30″E | | Before 1873 | Demolished before 1928. | |
| Exmorra | Polder 29; 53°03′41″N 5°28′11″E | | Before 1873 | Demolished before 1928. | |
| Exmorra | Polder 30; 53°03′47″N 5°28′05″E | | Before 1873 | Demolished before 1928. | |
| Exmorra | Polder 32; 53°03′23″N 5°27′13″E | | Before 1850 | Demolished before 1929. | |
| Exmorra | Polder 32a 53°03′16″N 5°27′40″E | Spinnenkopmolen | Before 1832 | Demolished post-1850. | |
| Exmorra | Polder 32b 53°03′09″N 5°27′19″E | Spinnenkopmolen | Before 1832 | Demolished post-1850. | |
| Exmorra | Polder 33; 53°03′19″N 5°26′58″E | | Between 1832 and 1850 | Demolished before 1932. | |
| Exmorra | Polder 33a 53°03′08″N 5°27′03″E | Spinnenkopmolen | Before 1832 | Demolished post-1850. | |
| Exmorra | Polder 33b 53°03′02″N 5°27′12″E | | Between 1832 and 1850 | Demolished before 1930. | |
| Exmorra | Polder 415; 53°03′28″N 5°29′28″E | | Before 1832 | Demolished before 1929. | |
| Exmorra | Polder 416; 53°03′35″N 5°29′02″E | Spinnenkopmolen | Before 1832 | Demolished before 1850. | |
| Exmorra | Polder Bruindeer; 53°03′13″N 5°27′04″E | | | Demolished c.1925. | |
| Exmorra | Polder Bruindeer | | | Demolished c.1925. | |
| Exmorra | Polder Bruindeer | | | Demolished c.1925. | |
| Exmorra | Polder Bruindeer | | | Demolished c.1925. | |
| Exmorra | Waterschap Exmorra; 53°03′37″N 5°27′33″E | Grondzeiler | 1882 | Burnt down 1913. | |
| Exmorra | Zurendsterpoldermolen; 53°03′10″N 5°27′58″E | | Before 1832 | Demolished before 1929. | |
| Exmorrazijl | Polder Exmorra Schraard; Polder 26; 53°03′49″N 5°27′53″E | Spinnenkopmolen | Before 1832 | Demolished 1947. | |
| Ezumazijl | De Gans; 53°20′58″N 6°08′19″E | Grondzeiler | 1850 | | |
| Ezumazijl | Molen van Arend Castelein; 53°21′20″N 6°07′47″E | | 1850 | Demolished post-1930. | |
| Ezumazijl | Molen van Gerrit Botma; 53°21′18″N 6°06′24″E | | 1880 | Demolished before 1929. | |
| Ezumazijl | Molen van Harke Douma; 53°21′30″N 6°08′28″E | | 1860 | Demolished before 1930. | |
| Ezumazijl | Molen van Sieds van Kleffens; 53°21′04″N 6°06′37″E | | 1880 | Demolished post-1929. | |
| Ezumazijl | Polder 1; 53°21′03″N 6°07′04″E | Grondzeiler | 1873 | Demolished between 1943 and 1949. | |
| Ezumazijl | Waterschap de Contributiedijken; Polder Grote Gans; Keegstra's Molen; 53°20′31″N 6°08′28″E | Grondzeiler | 1845 | Demolished 1963. | |
| Ezumazijl | | | Between 1750 and 1800 | Demolished post-1814. | |

== F ==
| Location | Name of mill | Type | Built | Notes | Photograph |
|---|---|---|---|---|---|
| Feankleaster | Molen van Veenklooster; 53°15′49″N 6°06′16″E | Standerdmolen | Before 1664 | Demolished 1714/15. | |
| Feanwâlden | De Houtwiel; 53°15′22″N 5°59′53″E | Paaltjasker | 1975 | | |
| Feanwâlden | Korenmolen van Veenwouden; 53°14′07″N 5°58′41″E | Standerdmolen | Before 1639 | Demolished between 1718 and 1832. | |
| Feanwâlden | Molen van Frans Antonides; 53°14′36″N 5°58′13″E | Spinnenkopmolen | Before 1832 | Demolished before 1850. | |
| Feanwâlden | Molen van Gerk van der Veen; 53°15′57″N 5°57′32″E | | Before 1832 | Demolished before 1850. | |
| Feanwâlden | Molen van Haren Fiersen; 53°15′06″N 5°59′10″E | Spinnenkopmolen | Before 1832 | Demolished before 1850. | |
| Feanwâlden | Molen van Jelle de Jong; 53°13′45″N 5°57′46″E | Tjasker | Before 1832 | Demolished before 1850. | |
| Feanwâlden | Molen van Johannes Jansma; 53°14′46″N 5°57′52″E | Spinnenkopmolen | Before 1832 | Demolished before 1850. | |
| Feanwâlden | Molen van Klaas Veenstra; 53°14′33″N 5°57′53″E | Tjasker | Before 1832 | Demolished before 1850. | |
| Feanwâlden | Molen van Pieter de Vries; 53°14′03″N 5°57′45″E | Tjasker | Before 1832 | Demolished before 1850. | |
| Feanwâlden | Molen van Pieter van der Wal; 53°14′20″N 5°58′42″E | Spinnenkopmolen | Before 1832 | Demolished before 1850. | |
| Feanwâlden | Molen van Reinder van der Kleijnse; 53°15′32″N 5°57′09″E | | Before 1832 | Demolished before 1850. | |
| Feanwâlden | Milen van Thijs Feenstra; 53°14′31″N 5°59′12″E | | Before 1832 | Demolishhed before 1850. | |
| Feanwâlden | Molen van Tjerk Vierssen; 53°13′53″N 5°57′50″E | Tjasker | Before 1832 | Demolished post-1850. | |
| Feanwâlden | 53°14′00″N 5°59′17″E | | 1830 | Burnt down 1883. | |
| Feanwâlden | Molen van Van der Veen; 53°14′00″N 5°59′17″E | Stellingmolen | 1885 | Demolished 1926, base demolished 1985. | |
| Feanwâlden | Polder 169; 53°14′44″N 5°58′43″E | Spinnenkopmolen | 1850 | Demolished post-1928. | |
| Feanwâlden | Polder 169a 53°13′48″N 5°58′11″E | Weidemolen | Before 1854 | Demolished before 1926. | |
| Feanwâlden | Polder 169b 53°13′44″N 5°57′55″E | | Before 1854 | Demolished before 1926. | |
| Feanwâlden | Polder 170; 53°15′00″N 5°59′47″E | Grondzeiler | 1850 | Demolished post-1928. | |
| Feanwâlden | Polder Antonides; 53°14′57″N 5°59′06″E | | Before 1930 | Demolished before 1947. | |
| Feanwâlden | 53°14′45″N 5°59′01″E | | Before 1930 | | |
| Feanwâlden | Tjasker de Houtwiel; 53°15′21″N 5°59′38″E | Paaltjasker | 1975 | Dismantled 1997. | |
| Feanwâlden | Water Molen; 53°15′25″N 5°58′16″E | | Before 1718 | Demolished before 1832. | |
| Feinsum | Slagdijkstermolen; 53°16′49″N 5°44′16″E | Grondzeiler | 1864 | Burnt down, 14 November 2026. | |
| Feinsum | Ietspolder; De Ietsmolen; 53°16′50″N 5°45′31″E | Grondzeiler | 1842 | Demolished post-1931. | |
| Feinsum | Molen van Gerrit Deijnema; 53°16′54″N 5°48′10″E | Spinnenkopmolen | Before 1832 | Demolished post-1930. | |
| Feinsum | Poelhuisterpolder; 53°16′39″N 5°46′38″E | Grondzeiler | 1827 | Demolished 1927. | |
| Feinsum | Polder 11; 53°16′45″N 5°47′13″E | | Before 1854 | Demolished post-1926. | |
| Feinsum | Polder 12; 53°16′38″N 5°47′54″E | Grondzeiler | Before 1854 | Demolished 1956. | |
| Feinsum | Polder 13; 53°16′48″N 5°48′24″E | Spinnenkopmolen | Before 1832 | Demolished between 1930 and 1949. | |
| Feinsum | Polder van Stiens; Poelensterpolder; 53°16′39″N 5°47′03″E | | Before 1832 | Demolished before 1930. | |
| Feinsum | Steenser Weider Meer; Polder 14; Molen Tolsma De Boer; 53°16′32″N 5°49′00″E | Spinnenkopmolen | Before 1718 | Demolished 1952. | |
| Ferwert | De Non; Kloosterpolder de Non; 53.°N 5.°E | Grondzeiler | 1846 | Burnt down 1990. | |
| Ferwert | Cichorijmolen van Albert de Vries; 53°20′19″N 5°49′55″E | | Before 1832 | Demolished post-1864. | |
| Ferwert | Ferwerder Molen; 53°20′11″N 5°49′59″E | standerdmolen | Before 1399 | Demolished post-1781. | |
| Ferwert | Het Bruin Paard; 53°20′17″N 5°49′04″E | Stellingmolen | 1698 | Demolished 1848. | |
| Ferwert | Het Bruin Paard; 53°20′17″N 5°49′04″E | Stellingmolen | 1848 | Demolished 1927. | |
| Ferwert | Molen van Rudolph van Holthe; 53°19′33″N 5°50′07″E | | Before 1832 | Demolished before 1850. | |
| Ferwert | Polder van den Meij; 53°20′11″N 5°50′25″E | | Before 1949 | Demolished post-1970. | |
| Ferwoude | Fallingabuurster en Aaltjesmeer Polder; Ferwouder Polder; De Grote Molen; 53°00′34″N 5°27′00″E | Grondzeiler | Before 1832 | Demolished 1941. | |
| Ferwoude | Fallingabuurster en Aaltjesmeer Polder; Ferwouder Polder; De Kleine Molen; 53°00′31″N 5°26′48″E | Grondzeiler | 1718 | Demolished 1941. | |
| Ferwoude | Molen van Carel Pallant; 53°00′30″N 5°27′47″E | Spinnenkopmolen | Before 1832 | Demolished before 1850. | |
| Ferwoude | Molen van Hans te Blocq van Scheltinga; 53°00′09″N 5°26′04″E | | Before 1832 | Demolished before 1850. | |
| Ferwoude | Pijpkaneelpolder; Pypkenielpolder; 53°00′34″N 5°26′07″E | Grondzeiler | Before 1832 | Demolished post-1930. | |
| Ferwoude | Polder 14a 53°00′16″N 5°27′37″E | | 1850 | Demolished 1923. | |
| Ferwoude | Polder 14b 53°00′07″N 5°27′24″E | | Before 1832 | Demolished before 1930. | |
| Ferwoude | Polder Meinschar; 53°00′14″N 5°26′40″E | Grondzeiler | Before 1832 | Demolished post-1832. | |
| Ferwoude | 53°00′21″N 5°25′28″E | Spinnenkopmolen | 1850 | Demolished post-1932. | |
| Ferwoude | Wonnnebuurster Polder; 53°00′49″N 5°32′57″E | | Before 1832 | Demolished post-1930. | |
| Firdgum | Groote Noorderpolder in Barradeel; Noordpolder onder Minnertsga; 53°15′10″N 5°33′51″E | Grondzeiler | 1869 | Burnt down 1911. | |
| Fochteloo | 52°59′09″N 6°19′28″E | standerdmolen | Before 1718 | | |
| Fochteloo | | Weidemolen | Before 1943 | | |
| Follega | FollegasterPolder; Polder 37; 52°53′16″N 5°44′07″E | Spinnenkopmolen | Before 1832 | Demolished 1968. | |
| Follega | Polder Follega; 52°53′13″N 5°44′05″E | Spinnenkopmolen | Before 1832 | Demolished post-1873. | |
| Folsgare | Molen van Pieter van der Groot; 53°05′18″N 5°36′13″E | Spinnenkopmolen | Before 1832 | Demolished 1846. | |
| Folsgare | Molen van Ruurd Abbema; 53°01′47″N 5°36′59″E | Spinnenkopmolen | Before 1832 | Demolished between 1850 and 1855. | |
| Folsgare | Molen van Ruurd Abbema; 53°01′59″N 5°36′45″E | Spinnenkopmolen | Before 1832 | Demolished before 1850. | |
| Folsgare | Polder 73; 53°02′27″N 5°34′35″E | Spinnenkopmolen | Before 1832 | Demolished before 1929. | |
| Folsgare | Polder 75; 53°02′26″N 5°34′56″E | Spinnenkopmolen | Before 1832 | Demolished before 1929. | |
| Folsgare | Polder 77; 53°02′20″N 5°35′20″E | Spinnenkopmolen | Before 1832 | Demolished 1925. | |
| Folsgare | Polder 80; 53°02′25″N 5°36′09″E | Spinnenkopmolen | Before 1832 | Demolished before 1929. | |
| Folsgare | Polder 83; 53°01′47″N 5°36′17″E | Grondzeiler | 1846 | Demolished post-1930. | |
| Folsgare | Polder 84; 53°01′46″N 5°36′32″E | Spinnenkopmolen | Before 1832 | Demolished post-1929. | |
| Folsgare | Polder 85; 53°01′55″N 5°36′48″E | Grondzeiler | Before 1832 | Demolished post-1930. | |
| Folsgare | Polder 86; 53°01′42″N 5°36′54″E | Grondzeiler | Between 1850 and 1873 | Demolished post-1929. | |
| Folsgare | Polder Het Maerland; Grote Zuid of Meerpolder 't Marlân; 53°02′18″N 5°35′46″E | Grondzeiler | 1809 | Demolished before 1929. | |
| Folsgare | 53°01′46″N 5°36′53″E | | Between 1850 and 1855 | Demolished before 1873. | |
| Formerum | 53°23′29″N 5°18′07″E | | Before 1733 | Burnt down post-1864. | |
| Formerum | Formerumermolen | standerdmolen | Before 1502 | Demolished post-1673. | |
| Formerum | Formerumermolen; 53°23′21″N 5°18′16″E | standerdmolen | Before 1673 | Moved 1888. | |
| Formerum | Koffiemolen; Formerumermolen; 53°23′21″N 5°18′16″E | Stellingmolen | 1876 | | |
| Franeker | Arkens; 53°11′17″N 5°33′27″E | Spinnenkop | 1973 | | |
| Franeker | De Eendracht; 53°11′06″N 5°33′26″E | Stellingmolen | 1867 | Burnt down 1891. | |
| Franeker | De Haan; 53°11′06″N 5°33′26″E | Stellingmolen | 1892 | Burnt down 1975. | |
| Franeker | De Gideon; 53°10′46″N 5°31′29″E | Paltrokmolen | 1762 | Demolished 1902. | |
| Franeker | De Stenen Molen; 53°11′01″N 5°33′46″E | Stellingmolen | Before 1770 | Demolished before 1785. | |
| Franeker | De Stenen Molen; De Twee Gebroeders; Stadspoldermolen; 53°11′01″N 5°33′46″E | Stellingmolen | Before 1785 | Demolished 1908. | |
| Franeker | De Valk; 53°10′45″N 5°31′39″E | Stellingmolen | 1855 | Demolished 1950. | |
| Franeker | Eek Molen; 53°10′50″N 5°31′32″E | | 1691 | Burnt down 1712. | |
| Franeker | Eek Molen; 53°10′50″N 5°31′32″E | | 1712 | Demolished post-1739. | |
| Franeker | Hout Molen; 53°11′05″N 5°33′35″E | | Before 1718 | Burnt down 1818. | |
| Franeker | IJsbaanmolen; 53°11′10″N 5°32′09″E | | 1850 | Demolished before 1930. | |
| Franeker | Molen van Eelke Ymessen; 53°11′03″N 5°33′29″E | Stellingmolen | 1780 | Demolished 1926. | |
| Franeker | Molen van Johannes Kampsma; 53°11′18″N 5°31′41″E | | Before 1832 | Demolished before 1850. | |
| Franeker | Molen van Leen van Sjaardema; 53°11′47″N 5°33′23″E | | Before 1832 | Demolished before 1850. | |
| Franeker | Molen van Sijbrand Wijbenga; 53°11′57″N 5°32′56″E | | Before 1832 | Demolished before 1850. | |
| Franeker | Noordermolen; 53°11′19″N 5°32′24″E | standerdmolen | Before 1598 | Demolished 1863. | |
| Franeker | Noordermolen; Hoek Molensteeg; 53°11′18″N 5°32′30″E | standerdmolen | Before 1510. | Demolished 1667. | |
| Franeker | 53°11′12″N 5°33′02″E | Stellingmolen | Before 1864 | Demolished 1892. | |
| Franeker | Oosterpoortmolen; 53°11′05″N 5°32′53″E | standerdmolen | Before 1598 | Demolished c.1758. | |
| Franeker | Oostermolen; De Ooster; 53°11′05″N 5°32′53″E | Stellingmolen | 1759 | Burnt down 1903. | |
| Franeker | Pelmolen van Ieme Johannes; Leer Molen; 53°11′03″N 5°33′29″E | Wip stellingmolen | Before 1664. | Demolished 1779. | |
| Franeker | Polder 34; 53°11′41″N 5°33′43″E | | Before 1832 | Demolished 1925. | |
| Franeker | Polder 35; 53°11′34″N 5°33′20″E | Spinnenkopmolen | 1832 | Demolished 1925. | |
| Franeker | Polder 35A; 53°11′42″N 5°33′01″E | | Before 1832 | Demolished before 1928. | |
| Franeker | Polder 36; 53°11′25″N 5°33′29″E | Spinnenkopmolen | Before 1827 | Moved within Franeker 1972. | |
| Franeker | Polder 37; Molen Lankum; 53°11′19″N 5°31′15″E | Grondzeiler | Before 1832 | Demolished 1831. | |
| Franeker | Polder 38; 53°10′59″N 5°31′10″E | Grondzeiler | Before 1832 | Demolished between 1943 and 1949. | |
| Franeker | Polder 39; 53°10′52″N 5°30′37″E | Spinnenkopmolen | Before 1832 | Demolished 1929. | |
| Franeker | Polder 39A; 53°10′52″N 5°31′56″E | | Before 1832 | Demolished before 1928. | |
| Franeker | Polder 40; 53°10′45″N 5°30′51″E | | Before 1832 | Demolished 1922. | |
| Franeker | Polder 41; 53°10′31″N 5°30′30″E | Spinnenkopmolen | Before 1832 | Demolished 1922. | |
| Franeker | Polder 45; 53°10′32″N 5°35′07″E | | Before 1832 | Demolished post-1850. | |
| Franeker | Polder 46; 53°10′22″N 5°34′32″E | | Before 1834 | Demolished post-1850. | |
| Franeker | Polder Kie; 53°10′28″N 5°30′44″E | | Before 1832 | Demolished 1906. | |
| Franeker | Salwerderpoldermolen; 53°10′48″N 5°35′20″E | Grondzeiler | Before 1832 | Demolished 1938. | |
| Franeker | Standerdmolen bij het Leeuwarderend; 53°11′13″N 5°32′52″E | standerdmolen | Before 1650 | Demolished before 1598. | |
| Franeker | Vleigerpolder; 53°10′32″N 5°32′47″E | | Before 1832 | Demolished post-1850. | |
| Franeker | Westerpoortmolen; 53°11′07″N 5°32′15″E | standerdmolen | Before 1560 | Demolished 1759. | |
| Franeker | Molen van Hobbo van Sminia; 53°06′09″N 5°48′07″E | | Before 1832 | Demolished post-1850. | |
| Friens | Molen van de Pastory; 53°05′32″N 5°48′04″E | | Before 1832 | Demolished post-1850. | |
| Friens | Molen van Eritis van Sminia; 53°06′11″N 5°48′02″E | Paaltjasker | Before 1832 | Demolished before 1850. | |
| Friens | Molen van Hobbo van Sminia; 53°06′09″N 5°48′07″E | | Before 1832 | Demolished post-1850. | |
| Friens | Polder 176; 53°05′07″N 5°47′44″E | Spinnenkopmolen | Before 1832 | Demolished 1931, base remains. | |
| Friens | Polder 177; 53°05′32″N 5°47′54″E | Spinnenkopmolen | Before 1832 | Demolished before 1929. | |
| Friens | Polder 178; 53°05′33″N 5°47′45″E | Spinnenkopmolen | Before 1832 | Demolished post-1929. | |
| Friens | Polder 179; 53°05′33″N 5°48′31″E | Spinnenkopmolen | Before 1876 | Demolished post-1929. | |
| Friens | Polder 180; 53°05′46″N 5°48′32″E | Spinnenkopmolen | Before 1832 | Demolished post-1929. | |
| Friens | Polder 183; 53°05′56″N 5°48′31″E | Spinnenkopmolen | Before 1832 | Demolished post-1929. | |
| Friens | Polder 184; 53°05′57″N 5°48′34″E | Spinnenkopmolen | Before 1832 | Demolished post-1929. | |
| Friens | Polder 185; 53°06′15″N 5°48′05″E | | Before 1832 | Demolished before 1929. | |
| Friens | Polder 186; 53°06′23″N 5°47′45″E | | Before 1832 | Demolished before 1929. | |
| Friens | Polder 187; 53°06′35″N 5°47′18″E | | Before 1832 | Demolished before 1929. | |
| Friens | Polder 188; 53°06′25″N 5°47′10″E | | Before 1832 | Demolished before 1929. | |
| Friens | Polder 189; 53°06′17″N 5°46′47″E | | Before 1832 | Demolished before 1929. | |
| Friens | Polder 190; 53°06′00″N 5°47′22″E | | Before 1832 | Demolished before 1929. | |
| Friens | 53°05′48″N 5°48′27″E | Spinnenkopmolen | Before 1832 | Demolished post-1929. | |
| Friens | 53°05′59″N 5°48′46″E | | Before 1832 | Demolished post-1939. | |
| Friens | 53°05′46″N 5°47′47″E | | Before 1832 | | |

== G ==
| Location | Name of mill | Type | Built | Notes | Photograph |
|---|---|---|---|---|---|
| Gaast | Gaasterpoldermolen; Polder Berouw; 53°00′50″N 5°25′37″E | Spinnenkopmolen | Before 1832 | Demolished post-1930. | |
| Gaast | Polder 9; 53°01′22″N 5°25′10″E | Spinnenkopmolen | Before 1832 | Demolished post-1850. | |
| Gaast | Polder 10; 53°01′30″N 5°24′50″E | | Before 1850 | Demolished before 1930. | |
| Gaast | 53°01′20″N 5°24′37″E | Weidemolen | 1850 | Demolished before 1930. | |
| Gaastmeer | Molen van Abraham Althuisius; 52°57′51″N 5°32′48″E | Spinnenkopmolen | Before 1832 | Demolished before 1850. | |
| Gaastmeer | Molen van Geert Overmeer; 52°58′12″N 5°32′21″E | | Before 1832 | Demolished post-1850. | |
| Gaastmeer | Polder 245; 52°57′37″N 5°33′01″E | Spinnenkopmolen | Before 1832 | Demolished before 1929. | |
| Gaastmeer | Polder 245a 52°57′32″N 5°33′30″E | | 1850 | Demolished post-1908. | |
| Gaastmeer | Polder 246; 52°57′59″N 5°32′42″E | Grondzeiler | Before 1873 | Demolished before 1929. | |
| Gaastmeer | Polder 247; 52°58′15″N 5°32′39″E | Grondzeiler | Between 1850 and 1873 | Demolished before 1929. | |
| Gaastmeer | Polder 278; 52°58′21″N 5°29′42″E | Spinnenkopmolen | Before 1850 | Demolished before 1930. | |
| Gaastmeer | Polder 279; 52°58′40″N 5°30′05″E | Grondzeiler | Before 1832 | Demolished post-1930. | |
| Gaastmeer | Polder 280; 52°58′12″N 5°32′09″E | Grondzeiler | Before 1832 | Demolished before 1932. | |
| Gaastmeer | Polder 281; 52°57′48″N 5°32′23″E | Grondzeiler | Before 1832 | Demolished post-1929. | |
| Gaastmeer | 52°58′10″N 5°30′20″E | | 1850 | Demolished post-1930. | |
| Gaastmeer | 52°58′21″N 5°32′15″E | | 1850 | Demolished 1930. | |
| Garyp | Korenmolen van Garijp; 53°09′53″N 5°58′04″E | standerdmolen | Before 1664 | Demolished before 1832. | |
| Garyp | Korenmolen van Van der Meer; 53°09′46″N 5°58′05″E | | 1864 | Demolished post-1887. | |
| Garyp | Korenmolen van Van der Meulen; 53°09′28″N 5°58′05″E | | Before 1832 | Demolished 1841. | |
| Garyp | Molen van Jan Boonstra; 53°10′08″N 5°58′31″E | Spinnenkopmolen | Before 1832 | Demolished before 1850. | |
| Garyp | Polder 140; 53°09′56″N 5°56′32″E | | Before 1854 | Demolished before 1925. | |
| Garyp | Polder 140a 53°09′47″N 5°56′38″E | | Before 1854 | Demolished before 1925. | |
| Garyp | Polder 140b 53°09′35″N 5°56′42″E | | Before 1854 | Demolished before 1925. | |
| Garyp | Polder 141; 53°10′15″N 5°57′02″E | | Before 1854 | Demolished before 1925. | |
| Garyp | Polder 142; 53°10′15″N 5°57′11″E | Spinnenkopmolen | Before 1832 | Demolished post-1850. | |
| Garyp | Polder 143; 53°10′14″N 5°57′57″E | | Before 1854 | Demolished before 1925. | |
| Garyp | Polder 195; 53°09′03″N 5°57′07″E | | Before 1876 | Demolished before 1924. | |
| Garyp | Polder 196; 53°08′55″N 5°57′45″E | | 1876 | Demolished before 1924. | |
| Garyp | Polder 197; 53°09′16″N 5°57′34″E | | 1876 | Demolished before 1924. | |
| Garyp | Polder 197A; 53°09′02″N 5°58′06″E | | 1876 | Demolished before 1924. | |
| Garyp | Polder 198; 53°09′12″N 5°58′11″E | Spinnenkopmolen | Before 1832 | Demolished post-1876. | |
| Garyp | Polder 199; 53°08′48″N 5°58′08″E | | 1876 | Demolished before 1924. | |
| Garyp | Polder200; 53°09′23″N 5°56′48″E | | 1876 | Demolished before 1924. | |
| Garyp | Polder 201; 53°08′25″N 5°58′37″E | | 1876 | Demolished before 1924. | |
| Gauw | Polder 181; 53°03′41″N 5°42′47″E | | Before 1832 | Demolished before 1929. | |
| Gauw | Polder 182; 53°03′33″N 5°43′12″E | | Before 1832 | Demolished before 1929. | |
| Gauw | Polder 183; 53°03′24″N 5°43′15″E | | Before 1832 | Demolished before 1929. | |
| Gauw | Polder 184; 53°03′17″N 5°43′22″E | | Before 1832 | Demolished before 1929. | |
| Gauw | Polder 185; 53°03′36″N 5°42′28″E | | Before 1832 | Demolished before 1929. | |
| Gauw | Polder 186; 53°03′05″N 5°42′54″E | | Before 1832 | Demolished before 1929. | |
| Gauw | Polder 187; 53°03′02″N 5°42′57″E | | Before 1832 | Demolished before 1929. | |
| Gauw | Polder 188; 53°03′01″N 5°42′41″E | | Before 1832 | Demolished before 1929. | |
| Gauw | Polder 189; 53°02′54″N 5°42′35″E | | Before 1832 | Demolished before 1929. | |
| Gauw | Polder 190; 53°02′55″N 5°42′29″E | | Before 1832 | Demolished before 1929. | |
| Gerkesklooster | Waterschap de Twee Provinciën; De Lauwers; 53°14′48″N 6°13′02″E | Iron windpump | 1923 | | |
| Gerkesklooster-Stroobos | De Hooiberg; 53°14′15″N 6°12′08″E | Stellingmolen | 1893 | Burnt down 1897. | |
| Gerkesklooster-Stroobos | Koorn Molen van Gerkesklooster; 53°14′34″N 6°12′25″E | standerdmolen | Before 1580 | Demolished 1763. | |
| Gerkesklooster-Stroobos | Molen van Berghuis; 53°14′16″N 6°12′33″E | Stellingmolen | 1877 | Demolished between 1920 and 1926. | |
| Gerkesklooster-Stroobos | Molen van Berghuis; 53°14′18″N 6°12′32″E | Stellingmolen | Between 1851 and 1854 | Demolished between 1920 and 1924. | |
| Gerkesklooster-Stroobos | Molen van Jan Tjoelker; 53°13′45″N 6°12′21″E | | Before 1832 | Demolished before 1850. | |
| Gerkesklooster-Stroobos | Molen van Martinus van Vierssen; 53°15′04″N 6°13′13″E | Spinnenkopmolen | Before 1832 | Demolished post-1850. | |
| Gerkesklooster-Stroobos | Molen van Popke Drieuwes-Kooi; 53°14′15″N 6°12′08″E | Stellingmolen | 1871 | Burnt down 1889. | |
| Gerkesklooster-Stroobos | Molen van Ritsema; 53°14′21″N 6°13′00″E | Stellingmolen | Between 1840 and 1850 | Burnt down 1912. | |
| Gerkesklooster-Stroobos | Molen van Welt; Molen van Kooi; 53°14′18″N 6°13′00″E | Stellingmolen | 1829 | Demolished 1937. | |
| Gerkesklooster-Stroobos | | | 1718 | Demolished 1752. | |
| Gerkesklooster-Stroobos | Polder 4 Polder Dijkhuizen; Waterschap Noorderpolder; Zwarte Watermolen; 53°14′39″N 6°11′27″E | Grondzeiler | 1870 | Demolished 1952. | |
| Gerkesklooster-Stroobos | Polder 5; 53°14′26″N 6°12′36″E | Grondzeiler | Before 1854 | Demolished before 1926. | |
| Gerkesklooster-Stroobos | Polder Buiten-Oosteinde; Buitenposter Maden; 53°15′14″N 6°10′45″E | Grondzeiler | 1874 | Burnt down 1938. | |
| Gerkesklooster-Stroobos | Polder Dromedaris; 53°14′21″N 6°13′26″E | | 1872 | | |
| Gerkesklooster-Stroobos | Waterschap Izermieden; 53°14′01″N 6°11′03″E | Grondzeiler | 1879 | Demolished 1937. | |
| Gerkesklooster-Stroobos | Waterschap Stroobos; Surhuister Hooilanden; 53°13′38″N 6°12′38″E | Grondzeiler | 1878 | Demolsished 1928. | |
| Gersloot | Oudewegsterpoldermolen | Achtkantmolen | 1819 | Moved to Veenpolder in 1851 where known as "De Beschermer". | |
| Gersloot | De Beschermer | Grondzeiler | 1851 | Dismantled 1938, house converted base with lower portion of smock remains. | |
| Gersloot | Oudewegsterpoldermolen; Voorste Molen; De Beschermer; 53°00′42″N 5°57′46″E | Grondzeiler | 1787 | Moved within Gersloot 1852. | |
| Gersloot | 53°00′06″N 5°57′57″E | Tjasker | Before 1926 | Demolished before 1952. | |
| Gersloot | Vierde en Vijfde Veendistrict, Molen Nr. 1; 53°01′25″N 5°56′26″E | Grondzeiler | 1835 | Demolished 1913. | |
| Goënga | Molen van Auke Bergsma; 53°03′34″N 5°41′47″E | | Before 1832 | Demolished before 1850. | |
| Goënga | Molen van Jan Speerstra; 53°03′38″N 5°41′30″E | | Before 1832 | Demolished before 1850. | |
| Goënga | Polder 116; 53°02′47″N 5°41′59″E | | Before 1832 | Demolished before 1929. | |
| Goënga | Polder 117; 53°02′40″N 5°42′12″E | | Before 1832 | Demolished before 1929. | |
| Goënga | Polder 192; 53°03′04″N 5°41′24″E | | 1850 | Demolished before 1929. | |
| Goënga | Polder 195; 53°03′21″N 5°40′52″E | | Before 1832 | Demolished before 1929. | |
| Goënga | Polder 196; 53°03′37″N 5°41′13″E | | Before 1832 | Demolished before 1929. | |
| Goënga | Polder 196a 53°03′44″N 5°41′22″E | | | | |
| Goënga | Polder 197; 53°03′19″N 5°42′13″E | | Between 1832 and 1850 | Demolished before 1929. | |
| Goënga | Polder 198; 53°03′41″N 5°42′05″E | | Before 1832 | Demolished before 1929. | |
| Goënga | Polder 199; 53°03′42″N 5°42′35″E | | Before 1832 | Demolished before 1929. | |
| Goënga | 53°03′24″N 5°41′44″E | | Before 1909 | Demolished before 1930. | |
| Goëngahuizen | De Jansmolen; De Modden; 53°04′58″N 5°53′13″E | Spinnenkopmolen | 19th century | | |
| Goëngahuizen | De Modderige Bol; 53°04′59″N 5°53′06″E | Spinnenkopmolen | c. 1848 | | |
| Goëngahuizen | Heechheim; 53°05′03″N 5°52′40″E | Spinnenkopmolen | 1820 | | |
| Goëngahuizen | Roekmolen; 53°05′41″N 5°53′38″E | Spinnenkopmolen | 2009 | | |
| Goëngahuizen | Molen van Jan van der Meulen; 53°05′12″N 5°53′41″E | Spinnenkopmolen | Before 1832 | Demolished post-1850. | |
| Goëngahuizen | Molen van Klaas Brandenburg; 53°05′30″N 5°54′41″E | Tjasker | Before 1832 | Demolished post-1850. | |
| Goëngahuizen | Polder 208; 53°05′41″N 5°53′59″E | Spinnenkopmolen | Before 1832 | Demolished post-1930. | |
| Goëngahuizen | Polder 209; 53°05′34″N 5°54′20″E | Spinnenkopmolen | Before 1832 | Demolished post-1924. | |
| Goëngahuizen | Polder 209a 53°05′40″N 5°54′36″E | Spinnenkopmolen | Before 1832 | Demolished post-1850. | |
| Goëngahuizen | Polder 210; 53.°N 5.°E | Spinnenkopmolen | Before 1832 | Demolished post-1924. | |
| Goëngahuizen | Polder 211; 53°05′23″N 5°53′56″E | | Before 1832 | Demolished post-1924. | |
| Goëngahuizen | Polder 212; 53.°N 5.°E | Spinnenkopmolen | Before 1832 | Demolished post-1924. | |
| Goëngahuizen | Polder 214; 53°04′54″N 5°52′53″E | Spinnenkopmolen | Before 1832 | Demolished post-1850. | |
| Goëngahuizen | Polder 217; 53°05′26″N 5°54′15″E | Spinnenkopmolen | Before 1832 | Demolished post-1850. | |
| Goëngahuizen | Turf Gravery; 53°05′09″N 5°54′50″E | | Before 1718 | Demolished before 1832. | |
| Goingarijp | Moloen van Taeke de Groot; 53°00′10″N 5°46′08″E | Spinnenkopmolen | Before 1832 | Demolished before 1850. | |
| Goingarijp | Polder 173; 53°01′19″N 5°46′24″E | Spinnenkopmolen | Before 1832 | Demolished before 1929. | |
| Goingarijp | Polder 174; 53°00′48″N 5°46′23″E | Spinnenkopmolen | Before 1832 | Demolished before 1929. | |
| Goingarijp | Polder 175; 53°00′35″N 5°46′09″E | Spinnenkopmolen | Before 1873 | Demolished before 1930. | |
| Goingarijp | Polder 176; 53°00′19″N 5°46′08″E | Spinnenkopmolen | Before 1832 | Demolished before 1929. | |
| Goingarijp | Polder 177; 53°00′17″N 5°46′10″E | Spinnenkopmolen | Before 1832 | Demolished post-1930. | |
| Goingarijp | Polder 178; 53°00′09″N 5°46′08″E | Spinnenkopmolen | Before 1832 | Demolished before 1929. | |
| Goingarijp | Polder 179; 53°00′00″N 5°46′06″E | Spinnenkopmolen | Before 1873 | Demolished post-1930. | |
| Gorredijk | 53°00′11″N 6°03′44″E | Wip stellingmolen | Between 1718 and 1726 | Demolished 1763. | |
| Gorredijk | Molen van Atse Sickes; 53°00′11″N 6°03′44″E | Stellingmolen | 1763 | Demolished post-1789. | |
| Gorredijk | De Hoop; 52°59′56″N 6°03′39″E | Stellingmolen | 1830 | Demolished 1928. | |
| Gorredijk | De Morgenster; 53°00′25″N 6°03′48″E | Stellingmolen | 1882 | Burnt down 1904. | |
| Gorredijk | De Vlieger; 53°00′00″N 6°04′10″E | Stellingmolen | 1871 | Demolished 1907. | |
| Gorredijk | 53°00′13″N 6°03′40″E | | 1636 | Demolished 1729. | |
| Gorredijk | Jaap Sikkes Moune; De Hoop; 53°00′13″N 6°03′40″E | Stellingmolen | 1729 | Moved to Jistrum 1919. | |
| Gorredijk | Korenmolen van Kortezwaag; 52°59′25″N 6°03′03″E | standerdmolen | Before 1664 | Demolished before 1718. | |
| Gorredijk | Polder G 53°00′24″N 6°03′38″E | | Before 1877 | Demolished before 1922. | |
| Gorredijk | Polder H. Mountsjein; Molen van Posthuma; 53°00′16″N 6°03′23″E | Spinnenkopmolen | 1800 | Dismantled 1922–23. Re-erected at the Netherlands Open Air Museum, Arnhem, Gelderland 1925. | |
| Gorredijk | Polder I 53°00′01″N 6°03′27″E | | Before 1877 | Demolished before 1922. | |
| Gorredijk | 53°00′17″N 6°03′30″E | Stellingmolen | 1763 | Demolished 1868. | |
| Gorredijk | Posthuma Molen; 53°00′17″N 6°03′30″E | Stellingmolen | 1868 | Moved to Twijtel 1912. | |
| Gorredijk | Skorsmoune; 53°00′19″N 6°03′31″E | Stellingmolen | 1838 | Demolished 1878. | |
| Gorredijk | Skorsmoune; 53°00′19″N 6°03′31″E | Stellingmolen | 1878 | Demolished 1942. | |
| Goutum | Kramersmolen; 53°10′33″N 5°45′54″E | Spinnenkopmolen | 2002 | | |
| Goutum | Molen Hoogland; 53°10′33″N 5°45′49″E | Spinnenkopmolen | 2003 | | |
| Goutum | Polder Siebenga; Polder Venema; 53°10′30″N 5°48′57″E | Iron windpump | 1930 | | |
| Goutum | Polder Vellinga; 53°10′05″N 5°49′18″E | Iron windpump | 1930 | | |
| Grauwe Kat | Molen van Carel van Pallandt; 53°06′46″N 5°29′56″E | | Before 1832 | Demolished before 1850. | |
| Grauwe Kat | Molen van Eretia van Sminia; 53°06′56″N 5°30′05″E | | Before 1832 | Demolished before 1850. | |
| Grauwe Kat | Molen van Samuël Verweij; 53°06′55″N 5°29′33″E | | Before 1832 | Demolished before 1850. | |
| Greonterp] | Greonterperpoldermolen; 53°00′48″N 5°31′09″E | Spinnenkopmolen | Between 1700 and 1720 | Demolished post-1931. | |
| Greonterp | Molen van Pieter van der Meulen; 53°00′57″N 5°31′47″E | | Before 1832 | Demolished post-1850. | |
| Greonterp | Oud Polder 18; 53°00′57″N 5°31′26″E | | Between 1832 and 1850 | Demolished before 1929. | |
| Greonterp | Nieuw Polder 18; 53°00′58″N 5°31′37″E | Grondzeiler | 1855 | Demolished before 1987. | |
| Greonterp | Polder 21; 53°00′55″N 5°30′27″E | Spinnenkopmolen | Before 1832 | Demolished post-1930. | |
| Greonterp | Sens en Atzebuurstermeerpolders; Bovenmolen; 53°01′04″N 5°31′39″E | | 1633 | Demolished c.1832. | |
| Greonterp | Sens en Atzebuurstermeerpolders; Sensmeermolen; Marmourne; 53°01′07″N 5°31′39″E | Grondzeiler | 1633 | Demolished c.1930. | |
| Grou | De Bird; De Burd; Koopmansmolen; 53°05′44″N 5°52′33″E | Spinnenkopmolen | 18th century | | |
| Grou | De Borgmolen; 53°06′17″N 5°51′45″E | Grondzeiler | 1895 | | |
| Grou | De Haensmolen; 53°06′29″N 5°51′41″E | spinnenkopmolen | 2007 | | |
| Grou | Tjasker; 53°07′15″N 5°50′43″E | Tjasker | 2004 | | |
| Grou | De Drie Gebroeders; De Hoop; 53°05′48″N 5°50′22″E | Grondzeiler | 1752 | Burnt down 1885. | |
| Grou | De Eendracht; 53°05′40″N 5°50′28″E | Stellingmolen | 1766 | Demolished 1911. | |
| Grou | De Hoop; Molen van der Leest; 53°05′48″N 5°50′22″E | Grondzeiler | c.1886 | Burnt down 1887. Base demolished 1890. | |
| Grou | De Jonge Falk; De Jonge Valk; 53°05′41″N 5°50′05″E | Stellingmolen | 1854 | Moved to Dordrecht, South Holland 1917. | |
| Grou | Korenmolen van Grouw; 53°05′48″N 5°50′22″E | standerdmolen | 1664 | Demolished 1752. | |
| Grou | Molen van Age Veenema; 53°07′17″N 5°55′38″E | Spinnenkopmolen | Before 1832 | Demolished before 1850. | |
| Grou | Molen van de Geref Kerk; 53°06′54″N 5°52′07″E | Spinnenkopmolen | Before 1832 | Demolished before 1927. | |
| Grou | Molen van Dijkstra; 53°05′56″N 5°50′20″E | Stellingmolen | 1873 | Demolished 1920. | |
| Grou | Molen van Eritia van Sminia; 53°05′13″N 5°48′10″E | Spinnenkopmolen | Before 1832 | Demolished before 1850. | |
| Grou | Molen van Frits de Vries; 53°06′37″N 5°52′07″E | Spinnenkopmolen | Before 1832 | Demolished before 1850. | |
| Grou | Molen van Gerrit Feenstra; 53°06′51″N 5°54′47″E | | Before 1832 | Demolished before 1850. | |
| Grou | Molen van Gerrit Feenstra; 53°06′56″N 5°54′20″E | | Before 1832 | Demolished before 1850. | |
| Grou | Molen van Johannes Heemstra; 53°06′03″N 5°51′17″E | Spinnenkopmolen | Before 1832 | Demolished between 1850 and 1876. | |
| Grou | Molen van Sipke Bottema; 53°05′33″N 5°49′52″E | Spinnenkopmolen | Before 1832 | Demolished before 1850. | |
| Grou | Molen van Tjeerd Wierstra; 53°06′55″N 5°50′19″E | Spinnenkopmolen | Before 1832 | Demolished post-1850. | |
| Grou | Molen van W. A. van Sloterdijk; 53°07′15″N 5°50′59″E | Spinnenkopmolen | Before 1832 | Demolished post-1850. | |
| Grou | Molen van Willem Faber; 53°04′38″N 5°49′29″E | Spinnenkopmolen | Before 1832 | Demolished before 1850. | |
| Grou | Polder 89; 53°06′32″N 5°54′09″E | | Before 1876 | Demolished before 1924. | |
| Grou | Polder 90; 53°06′33″N 5°53′57″E | | Before 1832 | Demolished post-1850. | |
| Grou | Polder 91; 53°06′27″N 5°53′04″E | Spinnenkopmolen | Before 1832 | Demolished post-1850. | |
| Grou | Polder 96; 53°05′42″N 5°51′37″E | Spinnenkopmolen | Before 1832 | Demolished between 1943 and 1950. | |
| Grou | Polder 97; 53°05′44″N 5°52′02″E | Spinnenkopmolen | Before 1832 | Demolished post-1929. | |
| Grou | Polder 98; 53°05′45″N 5°52′13″E | Spinnenkopmolen | Before 1832 | Demolished before 1950. | |
| Grou | Polder 100; 53°05′55″N 5°52′57″E | Spinnenkopmolen | 1743 | Demolished post-1937. | |
| Grou | Polder 101; 53°05′50″N 5°52′18″E | Spinnenkopmolen | Before 1832 | Demolished post-1930. | |
| Grou | Polder 102; 53°05′50″N 5°52′03″E | Spinnenkopmolen | Before 1832 | Demolished post-1850. | |
| Grou | Polder 103; 53°05′46″N 5°51′27″E | Spinnenkopmolen | Before 1832 | Demolished c.1947. | |
| Grou | Polder 104; 53°06′14″N 5°51′23″E | Spinnenkopmolen | Before 1832 | Demolished post-1943. | |
| Grou | Polder 105; 53°06′11″N 5°51′47″E | Spinnenkopmolen | Before 1832 | Demolished between 1943 and 1950. | |
| Grou | Polder 106; 53°06′22″N 5°52′08″E | Spinnenkopmolen | Before 1832 | Demolished 1895. | |
| Grou | Polder de Nije Borgkrite; Polder 106; Borgmolen; 53°06′21″N 5°52′28″E | Grondzeiler | 1895 | Moved within Grou 2008. | |
| Grou | Polder 107; 53°06′33″N 5°51′38″E | Spinnenkopmolen | Before 1832 | Demolished post-1930. | |
| Grou | Polder 108; 53°06′36″N 5°52′10″E | Spinnenkopmolen | Before 1832 | Demolished post-1930. | |
| Grou | Polder 109; 53°06′41″N 5°52′07″E | Spinnenkopmolen | Before 1832 | Demolished post-1930. | |
| Grou | Polder 110; 53°06′35″N 5°51′32″E | Spinnenkopmolen | Before 1832 | Demolished post-1930. | |
| Grou | Polder 111; 53°06′39″N 5°51′24″E | Spinnenkopmolen | Before 1832 | Demolished post-1850. | |
| Grou | Polder 112; 53°06′48″N 5°51′27″E | Spinnenkopmolen | Before 1832 | Demolished post-1929. | |
| Grou | Polder 113; 53°06′51″N 5°51′44″E | Spinnenkopmolen | Before 1832 | Demolished before 1930. | |
| Grou | Polder 114; 53°07′02″N 5°51′42″E | Spinnenkopmolen | Before 1832 | Demolished post-1930. | |
| Grou | Polder 117; 53°07′29″N 5°51′41″E | | Before 1832 | Demolished post-1850. | |
| Grou | Polder 127; 53°07′17″N 5°51′12″E | Spinnenkopmolen | Before 1832 | Demolished post-1850. | |
| Grou | Polder 128; 53°07′16″N 5°50′42″E | | Before 1876 | Demolished before 1924. | |
| Grou | Polder 129; 53°07′05″N 5°50′13″E | Spinnenkopmolen | Before 1832 | Demolished post-1850. | |
| Grou | Polder 130 (Noord); 53°07′00″N 5°50′11″E | | 1876' | Demolished post-1924. | |
| Grou | Polder 130 (Zuid); 53°06′58″N 5°50′12″E | Spinnenkopmolen | Before 1832 | Demolished between 1924 and 1929. | |
| Grou | Polder 131; 53°06′47″N 5°50′07″E | Spinnenkopmolen | Before 1832 | Demolished between 1924 and 1929. | |
| Grou | Polder 131; 53°06′48″N 5°50′20″E | | 1876 | Demolished post-1924. | |
| Grou | Polder 132; 53°06′45″N 5°49′29″E | Spinnenkopmolen | Before 1832 | Demolished before 1924. | |
| Grou | Polder 133; 53°06′36″N 5°49′20″E | Spinnenkopmolen | Before 1832 | Demolished between 1924 and 1929. | |
| Grou | Polder 134; 53°06′32″N 5°49′00″E | | Before 1832 | Demolished between 1924 and 1929. | |
| Grou | Polder 135; 53.°N 5.°E | Spinnenkopmolen | Before 1832 | Demolished between 1924 and 1929. | |
| Grou | Polder 136; 53°06′27″N 5°49′00″E | Spinnenkopmolen | Before 1832 | Demolished between 1924 and 1929. | |
| Grou | Polder 137; 53°06′12″N 5°49′30″E | Spinnenkopmolen | Before 1832 | Demolished between 1924 and 1929. | |
| Grou | Polder 138; 53°05′57″N 5°49′55″E | Spinnenkopmolen | Before 1832 | Demolished between 1924 and 1929. | |
| Grou | Polder 139; 53°05′46″N 5°49′27″E | Spinnenkopmolen | Before 1832 | Demolished between 1924 and 1929. | |
| Grou | Polder 140; 53.°N 5.°E | Spinnenkopmolen | Before 1832 | Demolished before 1924. | |
| Grou | Polder 141; 53°06′04″N 5°49′58″E | Spinnenkopmolen | 1832 | Demolished between 1924 and 1929. | |
| Grou | Polder 142; 53°06′12″N 5°49′59″E | Spinnenkopmolen | Before 1832 | Demolished between 1924 and 1929. | |
| Grou | Polder 142; 53°06′17″N 5°49′39″E | Tjasker | 1876 | Demolished post-1929. | |
| Grou | Polder 143; 53°06′28″N 5°50′05″E | Spinnenkopmolen | Before 1832 | Demolished between 1924 and 1929. | |
| Grou | Polder 144; 53°06′34″N 5°49′43″E | Spinnenkopmolen | Before 1832 | Demolished between 1924 and 1929. | |
| Grou | Polder 145; 53°06′55″N 5°50′17″E | Spinnenkopmolen | Before 1832 | Demolished post-1930. | |
| Grou | Polder 146; 53°07′11″N 5°51′13″E | Spinnenkopmolen | Before 1832 | Demolished post-1929. | |
| Grou | Polder 147; 53°06′35″N 5°51′08″E | Spinnenkopmolen | Befored | Demolished post-1929. | |
| Grou | Polder 148; 53°06′17″N 5°50′32″E | Spinnenkopmolen | Before 1832 | Demolished post-1929. | |
| Grou | Polder 149; 53°06′04″N 5°50′44″E | Spinnenkopmolen | Before 1832 | Demolished post-1929. | |
| Grou | Polder 150; 53°06′14″N 5°51′08″E | | Between 1832 and 1850. | Demolished before 1924. | |
| Grou | Polder 151; De Haensmole; 53°05′58″N 5°50′55″E | Spinnenkopmolen | 18th Century | Demolished in a collision with MV Renasa 2004. Rebuilt in 2007 at a new site in Grou. | |
| Grou | Polder 152; Minne Finne; 53°05′50″N 5°50′38″E | Spinnenkopmolen | Before 1800 | Demolished c.1980. | |
| Grou | Polder 153; 53°05′39″N 5°50′32″E | Spinnenkopmolen | Before 1832 | Demolished before 1924. | |
| Grou | Polder 154; 53°05′38″N 5°50′27″E | Spinnenkopmolen | Before 1832 | Demolished before 1924. | |
| Grou | Polder 155; 53°05′20″N 5°50′38″E | | Before 1832 | Demolished before 1924. | |
| Grou | Polder 156; 53°05′11″N 5°50′20″E | | Between 1850 and 1876 | Demolished before 1924. | |
| Grou | Polder 157; 53°05′07″N 5°51′00″E | Spinnenkopmolen | Before 1832 | Demolished before 1924. | |
| Grou | Polder 158; 53°04′51″N 5°50′55″E | Spinnenkopmolen | Before 1832 | Demolished before 1924. | |
| Grou | Polder 159; 53°05′01″N 5°50′44″E | Spinnenkopmolen | Before 1832 | Demolished before 1924. | |
| Grou | Polder 160; 53°05′02″N 5°50′34″E | Spinnenkopmolen | Before 1832 | Demolished before 1924. | |
| Grou | Polder 161; 53°05′37″N 5°50′16″E | Spinnenkopmolen | Before 1832 | Demolished before 1924. | |
| Grou | Polder 162; 53°05′31″N 5°50′07″E | Spinnenkopmolen | Before 1832 | Demolished before 1924. | |
| Grou | Polder 163; 53°05′40″N 5°49′52″E | Spinnenkopmolen | Before 1832 | Demolished before 1924. | |
| Grou | Polder 164; 53°05′25″N 5°49′08″E | Spinnenkopmolen | Before 1832 | Demolished before 1924. | |
| Grou | Polder 165; 53°05′28″N 5°48′45″E | Spinnenkopmolen | Before 1832 | Demolished before 1924. | |
| Grou | Polder 166; 53°05′25″N 5°48′45″E | Spinnenkopmolen | Before 1832 | Demolished before 1924. | |
| Grou | Polder 167; 53°05′20″N 5°48′13″E | Spinnenkopmolen | Before 1832 | Demolished before 1924. | |
| Grou | Polder 168; 53°05′13″N 5°48′01″E | Spinnenkopmolen | Before 1832 | Demolished before 1924. | |
| Grou | Polder 169; 53°04′45″N 5°47′58″E | Spinnenkopmolen | Before 1832 | Demolished before 1924. | |
| Grou | Polder 170; 53°04′34″N 5°48′29″E | Spinnenkopmolen | Before 1832 | Demolished before 1924. | |
| Grou | Polder 171; 53°04′43″N 5°49′03″E | Spinnenkopmolen | Before 1832 | Demolished before 1924. | |
| Grou | Polder 172; 53°04′44″N 5°49′04″E | | Before 1832 | Demolished before 1924. | |
| Grou | Polder 173; 53°04′43″N 5°49′35″E | Spinnenkopmolen | Before 1832 | Demolished before 1924. | |
| Grou | Polder 174; 53°04′53″N 5°48′58″E | Spinnenkopmolen | Before 1832 | Demolished before 1924. | |
| Grou | Polder 175; 53°05′05″N 5°48′58″E | Spinnenkopmolen | Before 1832 | Demolished before 1924. | |
| Grou | Polder 181; 53°05′38″N 5°49′00″E | Spinnenkopmolen | Before 1832 | Demolished between 1850 and 1876. | |
| Grou | Polder 203; 53°06′59″N 5°56′19″E | | Before 1876 | Demolished before 1924. | |
| Grou | Polder 204; 53°06′59″N 5°56′23″E | | Before 1876 | Demolished before 1924. | |
| Grou | Polder Auke Hinnesmeer; 53°07′09″N 5°51′29″E | | 1876 | Demolished before 1924. | |
| Grou | 53°05′35″N 5°50′12″E | | Before 1850 | Demolished before 1930. | |
| Grou | | Paaltjasker | | Demolished before 1939. | |
| Gytsjerk | De Windlust; De Korenaar; 53°14′13″N 5°53′49″E | Stellingmolen | 1863 | Burnt down 1978. | |
| Gytsjerk | Giekerkerpoldermolen; Polder van Giekerk en Oenkerk; 53°14′46″N 5°52′16″E | Grondzeiler | 1863 | Demolished 1925. | |
| Gytsjerk | Kanterland; 53°13′40″N 5°51′40″E | | | | |
| Gytsjerk | Kanterland; 53°14′00″N 5°51′41″E | Tjasker | Before 1832 | Demolished before 1850. | |
| Gytsjerk | Korenmolen van Giekerk; 53°14′13″N 5°53′49″E | standerdmolen | Before 1664 | Demolished post-1832. | |
| Gytsjerk | Molen van de Kerk; 53°14′30″N 5°52′29″E | | Before 1832 | Demolished post-1850. | |
| Gytsjerk | Molen van Hendrik Huizen; 53°14′03″N 5°51′59″E | Spinnenkopmolen | Before 1832 | Demolished before 1850. | |
| Gytsjerk | Molen van het Burger Weeshuis; 53°14′07″N 5°52′37″E | | Before 1832 | Demolished before 1850. | |
| Gytsjerk | Molen van Reinder Veenstra; 53°14′08″N 5°55′14″E | | Before 1832 | Demolished post-1850. | |
| Gytsjerk | Molen van Riemer Reitstra; 53°14′09″N 5°54′29″E | | Before 1832 | Demolished before 1850. | |
| Gytsjerk | Molen van Sjoerd Meintsma; 53°14′27″N 5°56′15″E | | Before 1832 | Demolished before 1850. | |
| Gytsjerk | Polder 98; 53°13′52″N 5°52′30″E | | Before 1832 | Demolished post-1930. | |
| Gytsjerk | Polder 99; 53°13′54″N 5°52′33″E | | Before 1832 | Demolished post-1850. | |
| Gytsjerk | Polder 100; 53°13′58″N 5°52′56″E | | Before 1854 | Demolished before 1926. | |
| Gytsjerk | Oud Polder 101; 53°13′57″N 5°53′05″E | | Between 1832 and 1850 | Demolished before 1874. | |
| Gytsjerk | Polder 101; Waterschap de Warren; 53°13′54″N 5°53′05″E | Grondzeiler | 1850 | Burnt down 1908. | |
| Gytsjerk | Waterschap de Warren; 53°13′54″N 5°53′05″E | Grondzeiler | 1908 | Burnt down 1938. | |
| Gytsjerk | Polder 102; 53°13′57″N 5°53′13″E | | Before 1854 | Demolished before 1926. | |
| Gytsjerk | Polder 103; 53°13′58″N 5°53′18″E | | Before 1832 | Demolished post-1850. | |
| Gytsjerk | Polder 106; 53°14′15″N 5°52′22″E | | Before 1850 | Demolished before 1930. | |
| Gytsjerk | Polder 107; 53°14′05″N 5°53′09″E | Spinnenkopmolen | Before 1832 | Demolished post-1955. | |
| Gytsjerk | Polder 108; 53°14′08″N 5°53′36″E | | Before 1854 | Demolished before 1926. | |
| Gytsjerk | Polder 162; 53°14′04″N 5°55′06″E | | Before 1854 | Demolished before 1926. | |
| Gytsjerk | Polder 162a 53°14′11″N 5°55′15″E | | 1832 | Demolished before 1874. | |
| Gytsjerk | Polder 163; 53°14′16″N 5°55′23″E | | Before 1832 | Demolished post-1850. | |
| Gytsjerk | Polder 164; 53°14′17″N 5°54′32″E | | Before 1854 | Demolished before 1926. | |
| Gytsjerk | Polder 164a 53°14′05″N 5°54′27″E | | Before 1832 | Demolished between 1850 and 1873. | |
| Gytsjerk | Polder 164a 53°14′13″N 5°54′42″E | | Before 1873 | Demolished before 1926. | |
| Gytsjerk | Polder 165; 53°14′19″N 5°54′54″E | | Before 1854 | Demolished before 1926. | |
| Gytsjerk | Polder 166; 53°14′36″N 5°55′27″E | | Before 1854 | Demolished before 1926. | |
| Gytsjerk | Polder 167; 53°14′30″N 5°55′40″E | | Before 1854 | Demolished before 1926. | |
| Gytsjerk | Polder 167A; 53°14′21″N 5°56′17″E | | Before 1854 | Demolished post-1926. | |
| Gytsjerk | Rijdpoldermolen; 53°14′02″N 5°53′32″E | | 1850 | Demolished 1947. | |

== Notes ==
Mills still standing marked in bold. Known building dates are bold, otherwise the date is the earliest known date the mill was standing.
