= Roekmole =

Windmill in Goëngahuizen, Netherlands

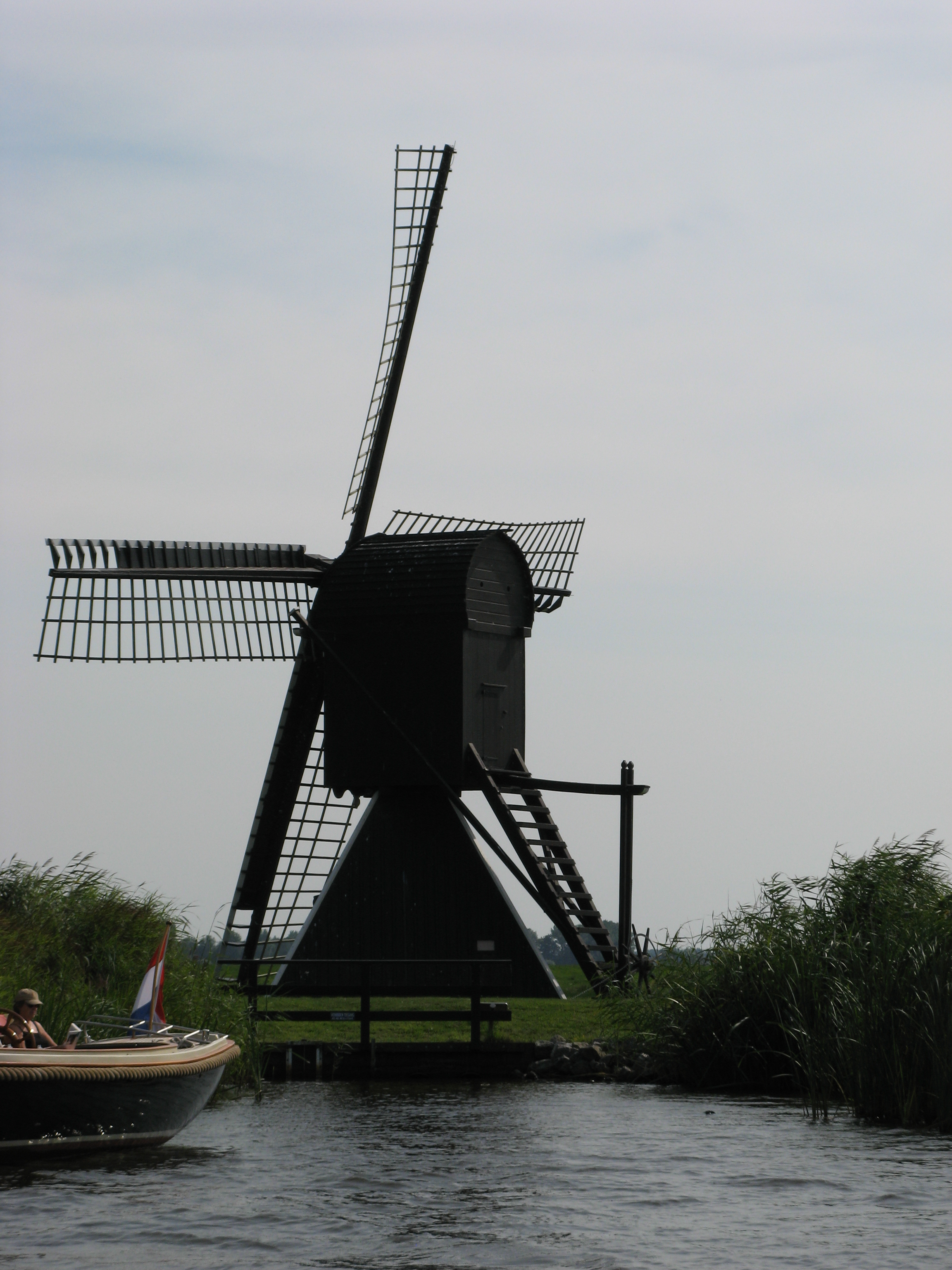
- Roekmole in 2013

Origin
- Mill name: Roekmole
- Mill location: Goëngahuizen
- Coordinates: 53°5′41″N 5°53′38″E
- Operator(s): Stichting It Lege Midden
- Year built: 1896 (2009)

Information
- Purpose: Drainage mill
- Type: Hollow post mill
- Roundhouse storeys: One storey roundhouse
- No. of sails: Four sails
- Type of sails: Common sails
- Winding: Winch
- Type of pump: Archimedes' screw

Roekmole is a hollow post mill in nature reserve It Eilân in Goëngahuizen, Friesland, Netherlands. It was moved there from polder Krieke near Aldeboarn and has been restored to working order. The mill is listed as a Rijksmonument, number 35972.

== History ==
The earliest record of a mill on the previous site was on a map published by W Eekhorn in 1849. The current mill was built in 1896 and drained polder Krieke. The mill is recorded as having been restored in 1960 and again in 1976, however it spent most of the 1980s and 1990s without sails. In 2009 it was moved to its current location and restoration to working order was finished in 2011. The previous nameless mill was renamed Roekmolen.

== Description ==
The Roekmolen is what the Dutch describe as a "spinnenkopmolen". It is a hollow post mill with a single storey square roundhouse. The roundhouse and body of the mill are covered with weatherboards. These are horizontal on the roof and vertical on the roundhouse and body. The mill is winded by a winch. The four Common sails had a span of 16.10 metres (52 ft 10 in). They are carried in a wooden windshaft. The mill drives an Archimedes' screw to drain the adjacent polder.
