= De Jansmolen, Goëngahuizen =

Windmill in Goëngahuizen, Netherlands

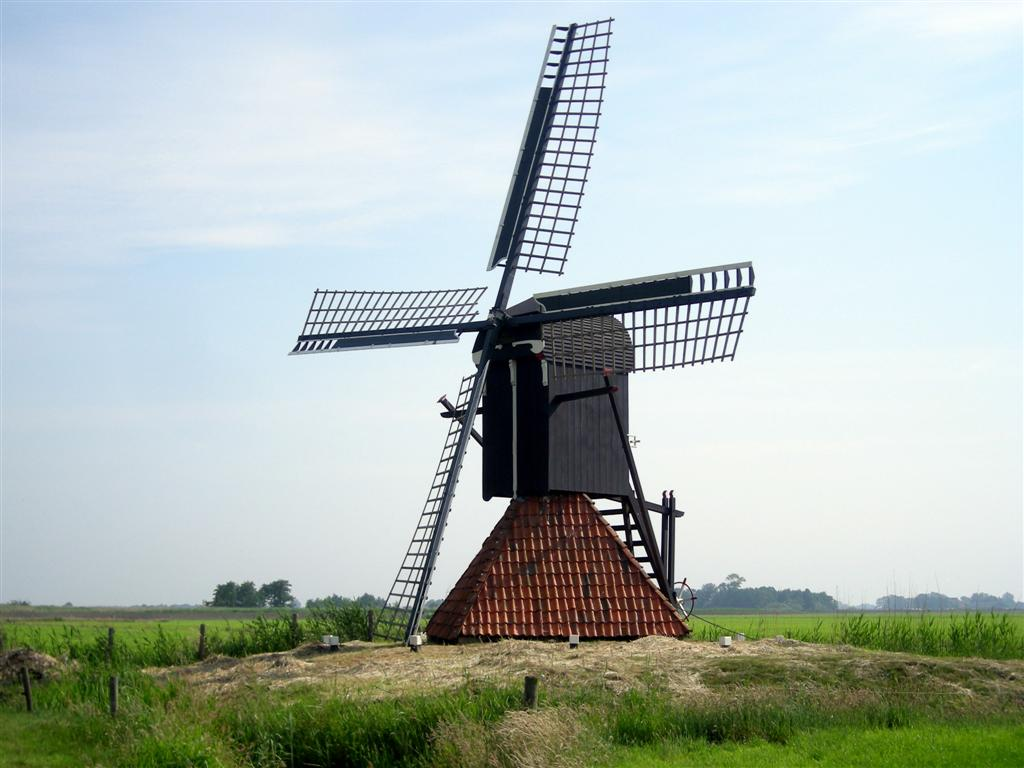
- De Jansmolen, June 2007

Origin
- Mill name: De Jansmolen; De Modden
- Mill location: Nabij Peansterdyk 10, 8497 NL Goëngahuizen
- Coordinates: 53°04′58″N 5°53′13″E
- Operator(s): Stichting De Fryske Mole
- Year built: 19th century

Information
- Purpose: Drainage mill
- Type: Hollow Post Mill
- Roundhouse storeys: Single storey roundhouse
- No. of sails: Four sails
- Type of sails: Common sails
- Windshaft: Cast iron
- Winding: Tailpole and winch
- Type of pump: Archimedes' screw

De Jansmolen or De Modden is a Hollow Post mill in Goëngahuizen, Friesland, Netherlands which has been restored as a landscape feature. The mill is listed as a Rijksmonument, number 34000.

== History ==
The date that De Jansmolen was built is unknown. The mill was marked on a map of Smallingerland dated 1848. The mill was at work until 1952. During the summer it drained an area of 200 pondemaat (73 ha; 180 acres) and during the winter it drained an area of 60 pondemaat (22 ha; 54 acres). The mill was restored in 1954 and 1967. On 9 November 1978, the mill was sold to Stichting De Fryske Mole (English: Frisian Mills Foundation). The mill was restored again in 1990.

== Description ==
De Jansmolen is what the Dutch describe as an spinnenkop. It is a hollow post mill on a single-storey square roundhouse. The mill is winded by tailpole and winch. The roundhouse is clad in pantiles and mill body is covered in vertical boards, while the roof of the mill is boarded vertically and covered in felt. The sails are Common sails. They have a span of 14.00 metres (45 ft 11 in). The sails are carried on a cast-iron windshaft. Apart from the brake wheel, the mill is devoid of machinery.

== Public access ==
De Jansmolen is open by appointment.
