= De Haensmolen, Grou =

Wind mill in Boornsterhem

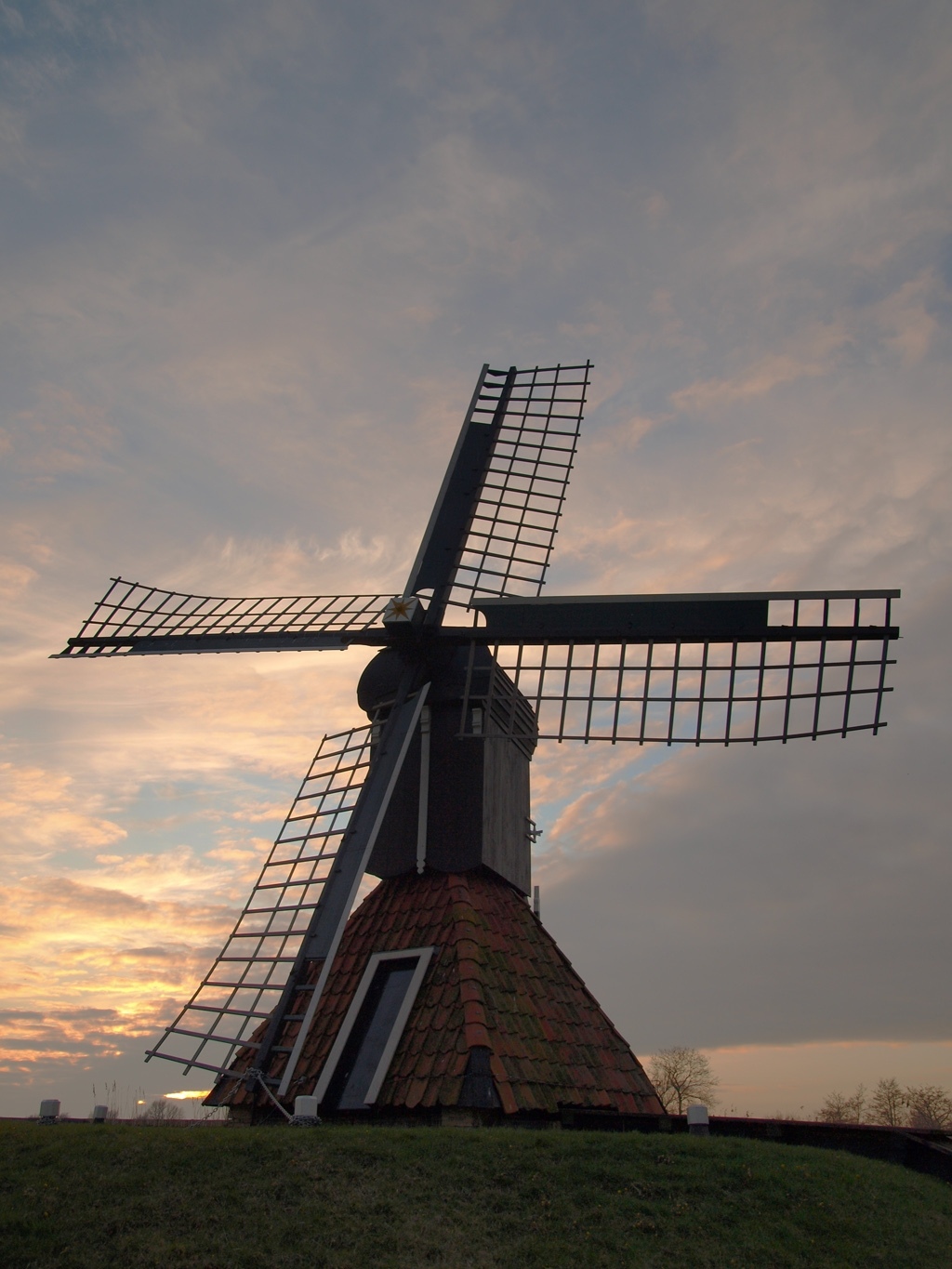
- De Haensmolen, April 2009

Origin
- Mill name: De Haensmolen
- Mill location: Eiland de Burd, Grou
- Coordinates: 53.0997°N 5.8486°E
- Operator(s): Stichting Molens De Lege Midden
- Year built: 2007

Information
- Purpose: Drainage mill
- Type: Hollow Post Mill
- Roundhouse storeys: Single storey roundhouse
- No. of sails: Four sails
- Type of sails: Common sails
- Windshaft: Cast iron
- Winding: Tailpole and winch
- Type of pump: Archimedes' screw

De Haensmolen is a Hollow Post mill in Grou, Friesland, Netherlands which was rebuilt in 2007 after it was demolished by a boat in 2004. The mill is listed as a Rijksmonument, number 22917.

== History ==
The mill was probably built in the 18th century to drain the Gallelannen. In 1941 it was bought by the province of Friesland. The mill was restored in 1993. The original location of the mill was at the junction of the Prinses Margriet Canal and the Pikmeer. On 9 January 2004, the mill was demolished in an accident in which the MV Renasa was in collision with the riverbank where the mill was located.

The Stichting De Fryske Mole (English: Frisian Mills Foundation) had already planned to move the mill. The mill was restored at a new site in Grou, to the northwest of De Burd. A new body and windshaft were needed. The restoration of De Haensmolen was completed in October 2007 and it was officially reopened on 12 May 2008. On completion of the restoration, the mill was transferred to the Stichting Molens De Lege Midden (English: De Lege Midden Mills Society).

== Description ==
De Haensmolen is what the Dutch describe as an spinnenkop. It is a hollow post mill on a single-storey square roundhouse. The mill is winded by tailpole and winch. The roundhouse is covered in pantiles. The mill body is covered in vertical boards, while the roof of the mill is boarded horizontally. The sails are Common sails. They have a span of 12.40 metres (40 ft 8 in). The sails are carried on a cast-iron windshaft. The windshaft also carries the brake wheel which has 28 cogs. This drives the wallower (15 cogs) at the top of the upright shaft. Other machinery is now missing. The mill formerly drove an Archimedes' screw.
