= De Modderige Bol, Goëngahuizen =

Windmill in Goëngahuizen, Netherlands

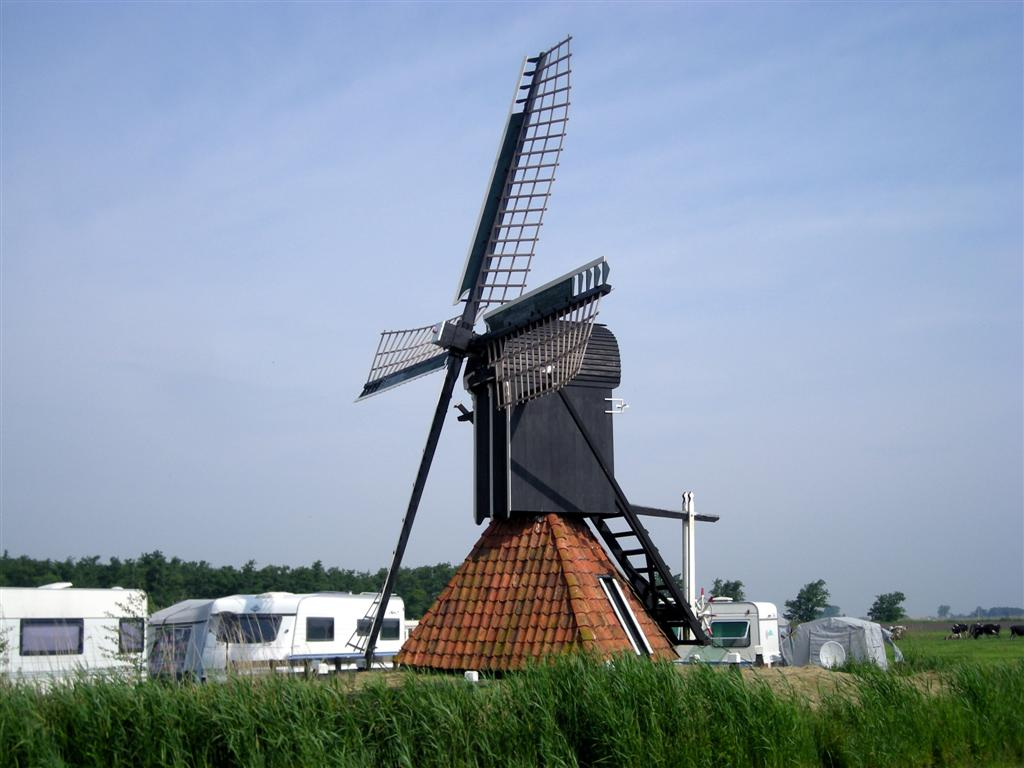
- De Modderige Bol, October 2007

Origin
- Mill name: De Modderige Bol
- Mill location: Nabij Peansterdyk 10 8497 NL Goëngahuizen
- Coordinates: 53°04′59″N 5°53′06″E
- Operator(s): Stichting De Fryske Mole
- Year built: Mid-19th century

Information
- Purpose: Drainage mill
- Type: Hollow Post Mill
- Roundhouse storeys: Single storey roundhouse
- No. of sails: Four sails
- Type of sails: Common sails
- Windshaft: Wood
- Winding: Tailpole and winch
- Type of pump: Archimedes' screw

De Modderige Bol is a Hollow Post mill in Goëngahuizen, Friesland, Netherlands which has been restored to working order. The mill is listed as a Rijksmonument, number 34001.

== History ==
The date that De Modderige Bol was built is unknown. The earliest record is its appearance on a map dated 1848. Until 1952, the mill drained the polder Adamse, which had an area of 150 pondemaat (55 ha; 140 acres). The mill was restored in 1954 and 1969. A further restoration was undertaken in 1978 by millwrights Bouwbedrijf Van Zuiden of Tjerkwerd. On 9 November 1978, the mill was sold to Stichting De Fryske Mole (English: Frisian Mills Foundation). The mill was restored again in 1992–93.

== Description ==
De Modderige Bol is what the Dutch describe as an spinnenkop -. It is a hollow post mill on a single storey square roundhouse. The mill is winded by tailpole and winch. The roundhouse is clad in pantiles and mill body is covered in vertical boards, while the roof of the mill is boarded and covered in felt. The sails are Common sails. They have a span of 11.90 metres (39 ft 1 in). The sails are carried on a wooden windshaft. The windshaft also carries the brake wheel which has 43 cogs. This drives the wallower (21 cogs) at the top of the upright shaft. At the bottom of the upright shaft, the crown wheel, which has 31 cogs drives a gearwheel with 30 cogs on the axle of the Archimedes' screw. The axle of the Archimedes' screw is 250 millimetres (9¾ inches) diameter. The screw is 750 millimetres (2 ft 6 in) diameter and 3.40 metres (11 ft 2 in) long. It is inclined at 24°. Each revolution of the screw lifts 106 litres (23 imp gal) of water.

== Public access ==
De Modderige Bol is open by appointment.
