= Heechhiem, Goëngahuizen =

Windmill in Goëngahuizen, Netherlands

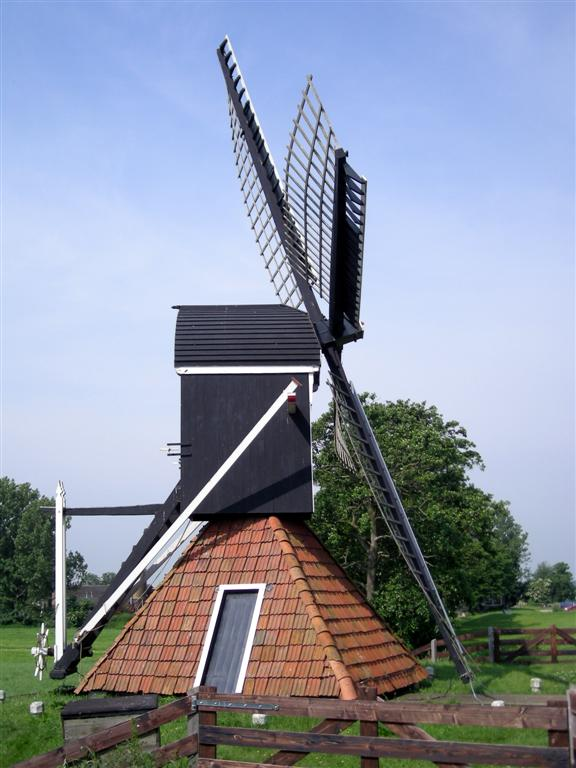
- Heechhiem, October 2007

Origin
- Mill name: Heechhiem
- Mill location: Nabij Peansterdyk 18, 8497 NL Goëngahuizen
- Coordinates: 53°04′59″N 5°53′06″E
- Operator(s): Stichting De Fryske Mole
- Year built: 18th century

Information
- Purpose: Drainage mill
- Type: Hollow Post Mill
- Roundhouse storeys: Single storey roundhouse
- No. of sails: Four sails
- Type of sails: Common sails
- Windshaft: Wood
- Winding: Tailpole and winch
- Type of pump: Archimedes' screw

Heechhiem is a Hollow Post mill in Goëngahuizen, Friesland, Netherlands which has been restored to working order. The mill is listed as a Rijksmonument, number 33999.

== History ==
The date that Heechhiem was built is unknown, but it is thought to date from the 18th century. The earliest date that the mill is known to have been standing is 1820. The mill was marked on a map of Smallingerland dated 1848. The mill drained the polder De Boer. The mill was restored in 1954, 1970 and 1977. On 9 November 1978, the mill was sold to Stichting De Fryske Mole (English: Frisian Mills Foundation). The mill was restored again in 1995. It is maintained in full working order and held in reserve should it be required for drainage purposes.

== Description ==
Heechhiem is what the Dutch describe as an spinnenkop. It is a hollow post mill on a single storey square roundhouse. The mill is winded by tailpole and winch. The roundhouse is clad in pantiles and mill body is covered in vertical boards, while the roof of the mill is boarded horizontally and covered in felt. The sails are Common sails with a span of 14.00 metres (45 ft 11 in). The sails are carried on a wooden windshaft that carries the 41-cog brake wheel. This drives the wallower (23 cogs) at the top of the upright shaft. At the bottom of the upright shaft, the crown wheel, which has 33 cogs drives a gearwheel with 29 cogs on the axle of the Archimedes' screw. The axle of the Archimedes' screw is 280 millimetres (11 in) diameter. The screw is 920 millimetres (3 ft 0 in) diameter and 5.45 metres (17 ft 11 in) long. It is inclined at 15½°. Each revolution of the screw lifts 296 litres (65 imp gal) of water.

== Public access ==
Heechhiem is open by appointment.
