= Koffiemolen, Formerum =

Windmill in Formerum, Netherlands

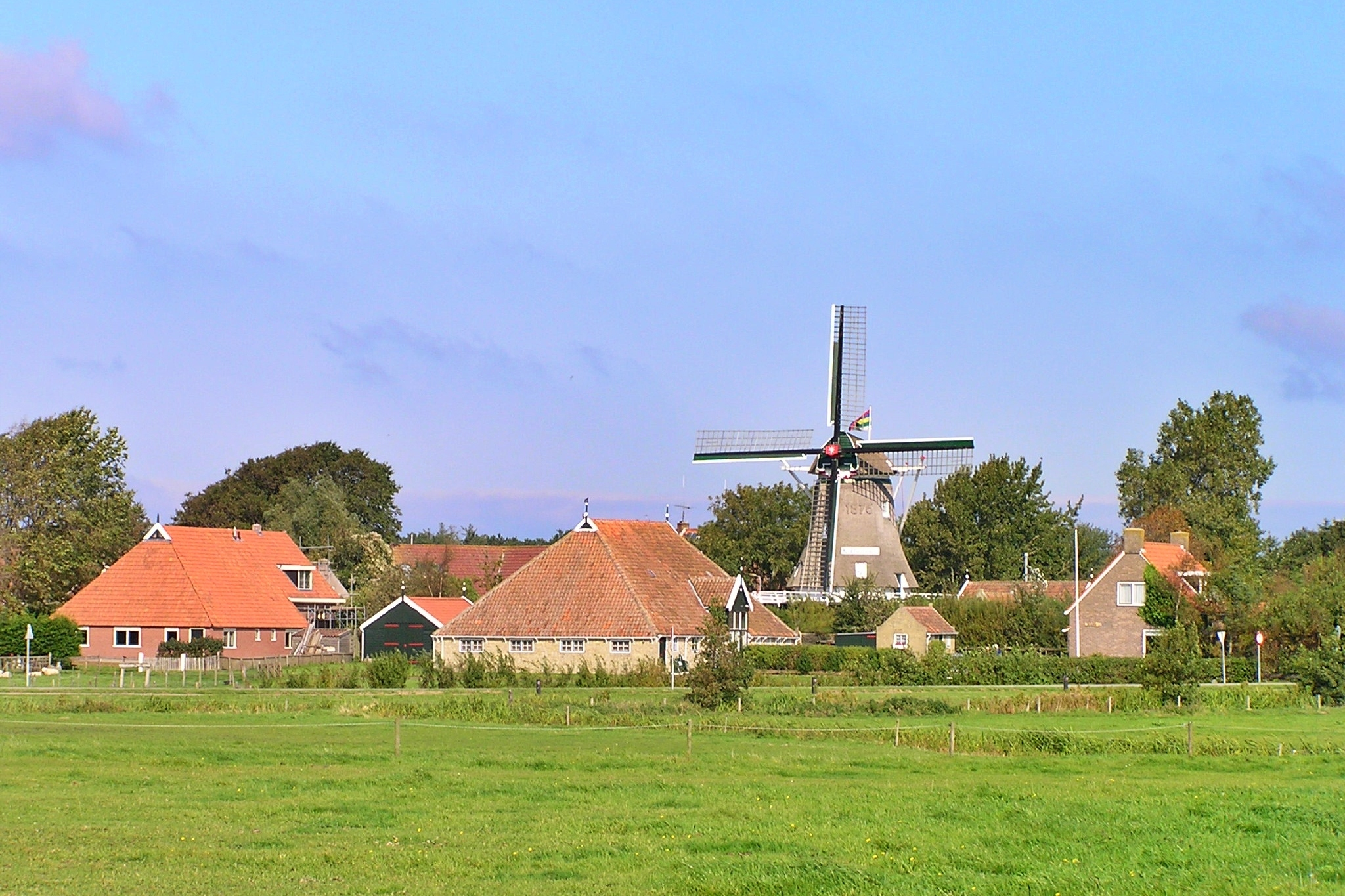
- Koffiemolen, September 2008
- Interactive map of Koffiemolen, Formerum

Origin
- Mill name: Koffiemolen; Formerumermolen
- Mill location: Formerum 6, 8894 KG, Formerum
- Coordinates: 53°23′21″N 5°18′16″E
- Operator: Private
- Year built: 1876

Information
- Purpose: Corn mill and barley mill
- Type: Smock mill
- Storeys: Three-storey smock
- Base storeys: One-storey base
- Smock sides: Eight sides
- No. of sails: Four sails
- Type of sails: Common sails
- Windshaft: Cast iron
- Winding: Tailpole and winch
- Auxiliary power: Engine
- No. of pairs of millstones: Two pairs
- Size of millstones: One pair 1.30 metres (4 ft 3 in) diameter, one pair 1.40 metres (4 ft 7 in) diameter

Koffiemolen (English: Coffee Mill) or Formerumermolen (English: Mill of Formerum) is a smock mill in Formerum, on the island of Terschelling, Friesland, Netherlands which was built in 1876 and has been restored to working order. The mill is listed as a Rijksmonument, number 35076.

== History ==
The first windmill at Formerum was built in 1502. Koffiemolen was originally built in 1838 on the Dellewall in west Terschelling for Hendrik Stobbe. At one time, the mill was a corn and mustard mill. In 1876, it was moved to its present location by P S Bos. In September 1935, one pair of sails was streamlined on the Fok System and one pair of Bilau sails was fitted. In 1946, the Friese Molencommissie (English: Frisian Mills Commission) estimated that the mill would cost ƒ5,000 to restore. By this time the mill had lost a pair of sails. The mill was sold by Jaap Bos to Jan van Dieren in 1964. He used the ground floor of the mill as a coffee house, but left the machinery in the mill intact. The former engine house was converted to a kitchen and toilet. A further restoration was undertaken in 1980–81. The sails were replaced after a twenty-year absence. A further restoration was undertaken in 2002–03. Koffiemolen is the only windmill on Terschelling.

== Description ==
Koffiemolen is what the Dutch describe as a "stellingmolen" . It is a three-storey smock mill on a one-storey base. The stage is at first-floor level, 3.25 metres (10 ft 8 in) above ground level. The smock and cap are thatched. The mill is winded by tailpole and winch. The sails are Common sails. They have a span of 19.50 metres (64 ft 0 in). The sails are carried on a cast-iron windshaft, which was cast by Prins van Oranje, The Hague in 1891. The windshaft also carries the clasp arm brake wheel, which has 61 cogs. This drives the wallower (32 cogs) at the top of the upright shaft. At the bottom of the upright shaft, the great spur wheel, which has 86 cogs. There are two pairs of French Burr stones. One pair is 1.30 metres (4 ft 3 in) in diameter. It is driven by a lantern pinion stone nut which has 27 staves. The second pair are Cullen stones, they are 1.40 metres (4 ft 7 in) in diameter and are driven by a lantern pinion stone nut which has 28 staves. The other pair is 1.40 metres (4 ft 7 in) in diameter. It is driven by a lantern pinion stone nut which has 29 staves.

== Public access ==
Koffiemolen is open to the public by appointment.
