= Formerum =

Formerum Formearum
- Village
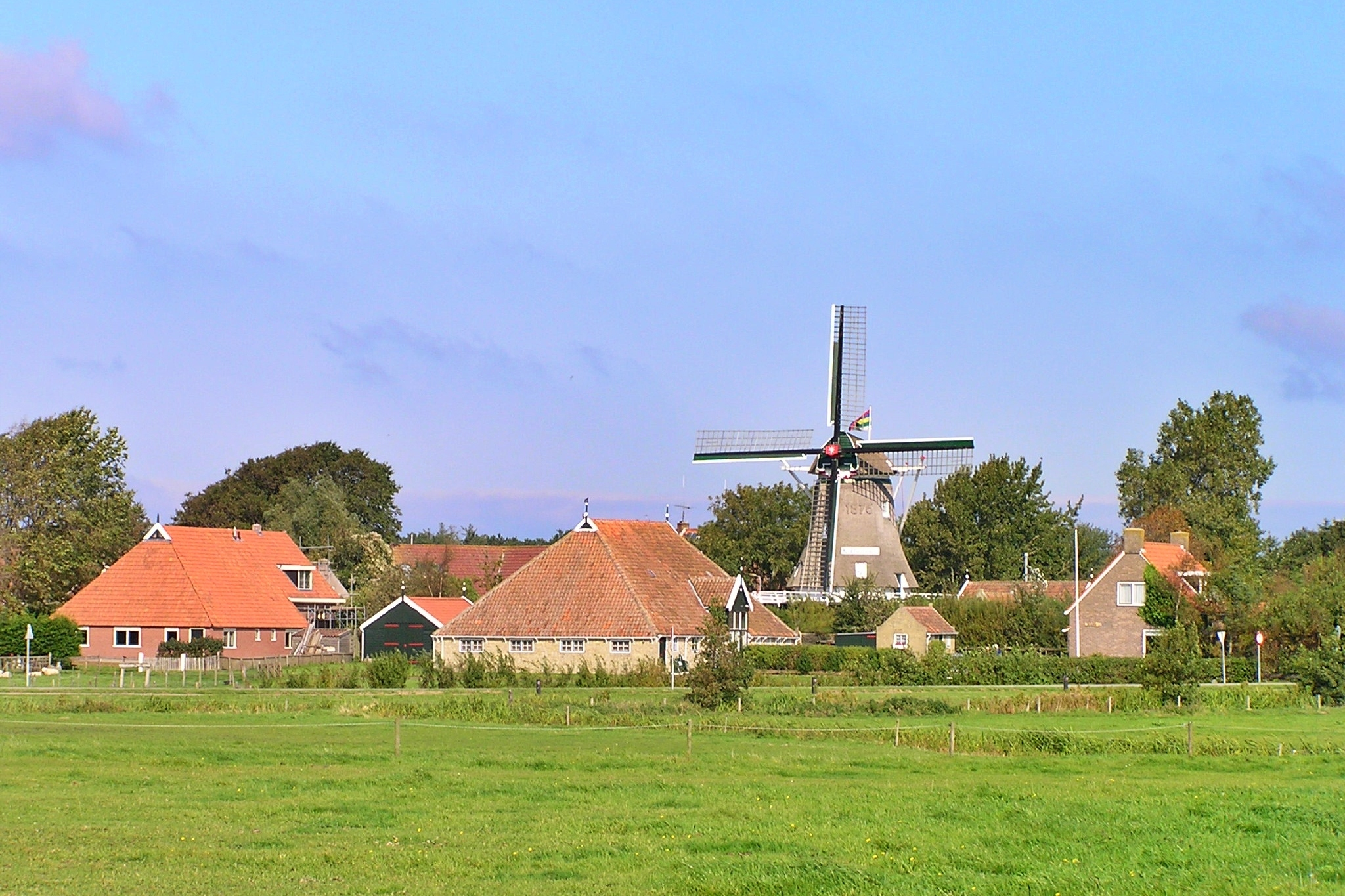
- Formerum with the Koffiemolen

- Location of Formerum on Terschelling

- Location in the Netherlands
- Country: Netherlands
- Province: Friesland
- Municipality: Terschelling

Population (1 January 2017)
  - Total: 211
- Time zone: UTC+1 (CET)
  - Summer (DST): UTC+2 (CEST)
- Postal code: 8894
- Dialing code: 0562

Formerum (West Frisian: Formearum) is a village in the north of the Netherlands, on the island of Terschelling, Friesland. It had a population of around 211 in January 2017. The Russian ship Oka 18 sank in 1966 near this village. Until recently her funnel could be seen rising out from the sea. The village boasts a smock mill, the Koffiemolen.

It was the birthplace of the 16th century Dutch Arctic explorer Willem Barentsz.

== Sources ==
- Municipality guide Terschelling 2005-2006
