= Follega =

Follega Follegea
- Village
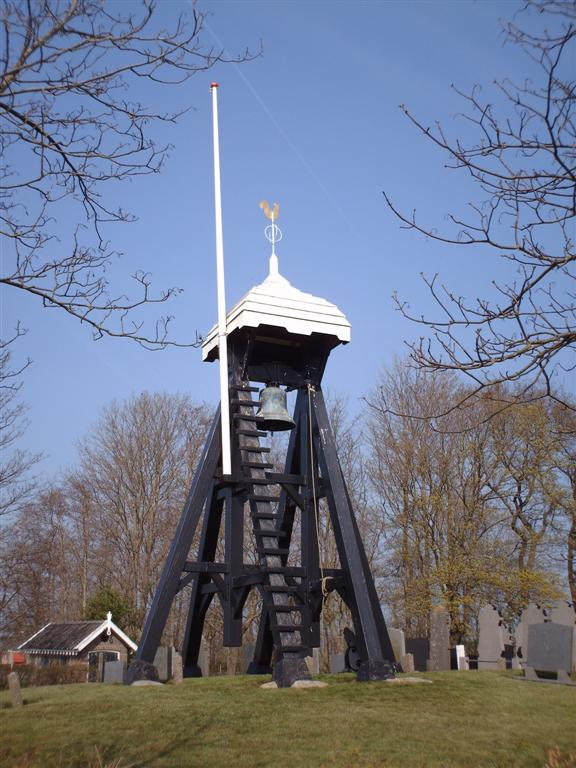
- Follega Bell Tower

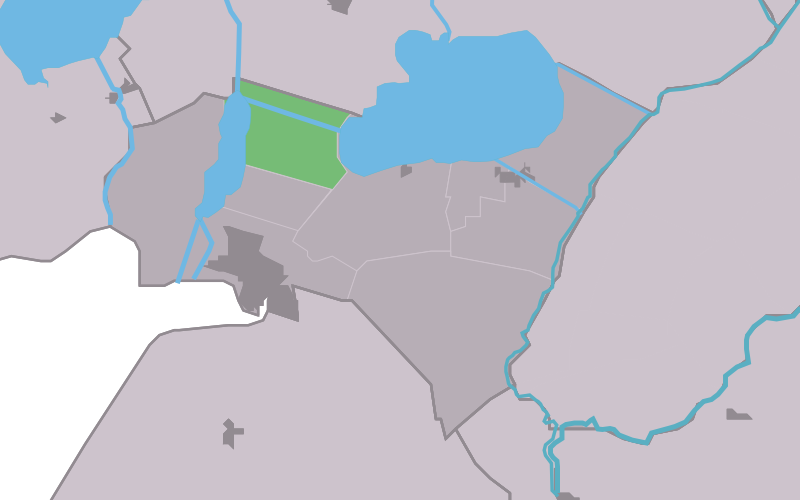
- Location in the former Lemsterlân municipality

- Location in the Netherlands Follega (Netherlands)
- Country: Netherlands
- Province: Friesland
- Municipality: De Fryske Marren

Area
  - Total: 8.45 km^{2} (3.26 sq mi)
- Elevation: −0.8 m (−2.6 ft)

Population (2021)
  - Total: 180
  - Density: 21/km^{2} (55/sq mi)
- Time zone: UTC+1 (CET)
  - Summer (DST): UTC+2 (CEST)
- Postal code: 8535
- Dialing code: 0514

Follega (West Frisian: Follegea) is a small village in De Fryske Marren in the province of Friesland, the Netherlands. It had a population of around 155 in 2017.

The village was first mentioned in the 13th century as Ecclesia Folcolfi, and means "the settlement of Folle (person)". The church was demolished in the 17th century and never rebuilt. On 2 October 1799, English soldiers tried to take the bridge, but were attacked by armed citizens and had to retreat. The local inn used to be called De Drie Kogels (The three bullets), because it had received three bullet holes during the fighting. In 1840, it was home to 231 people. There was a little wind mill near Follega built in 1857, but it was sold to Laag-Keppel in 1968.

== Gallery ==
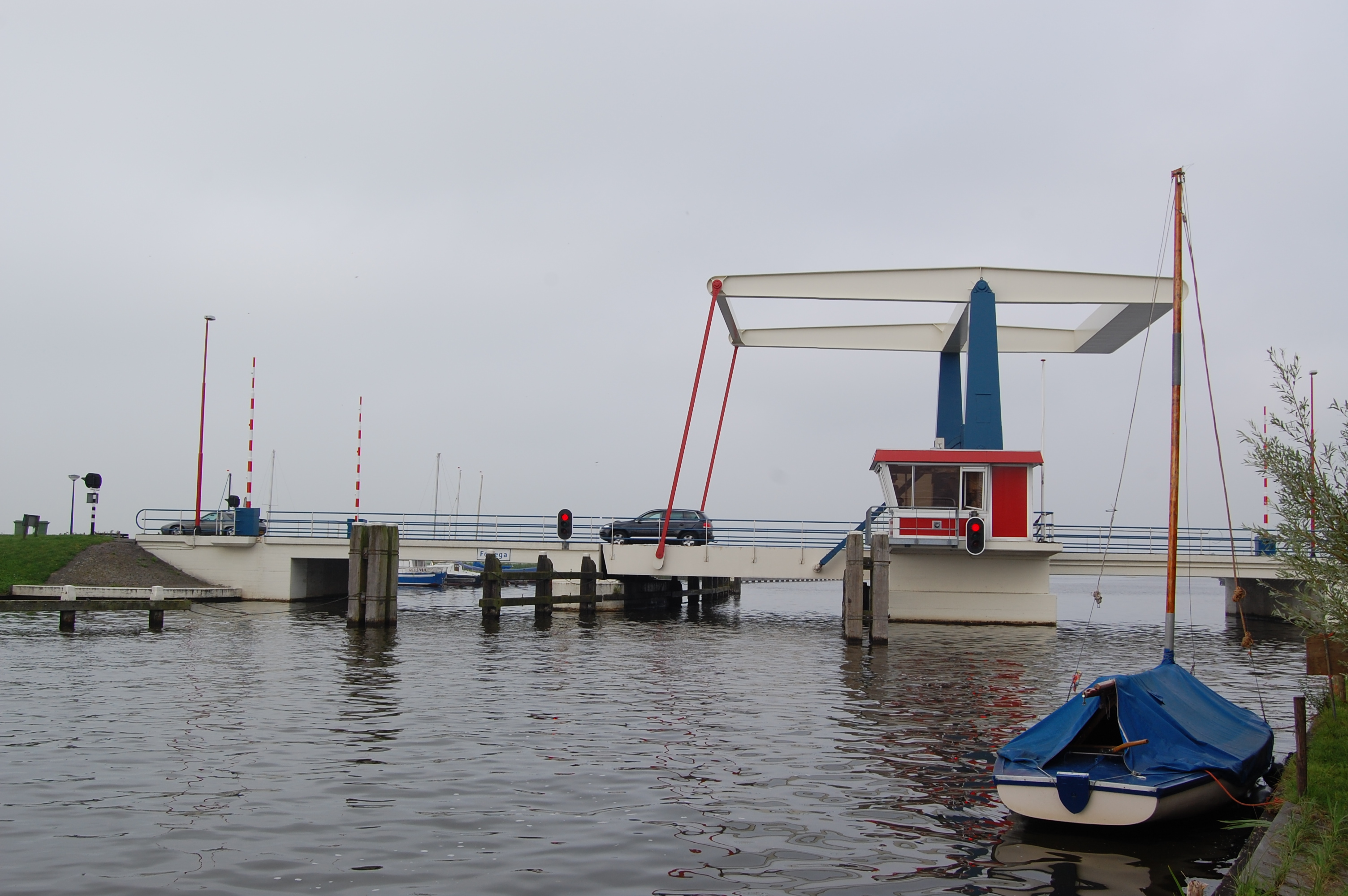
The bridge near Follega

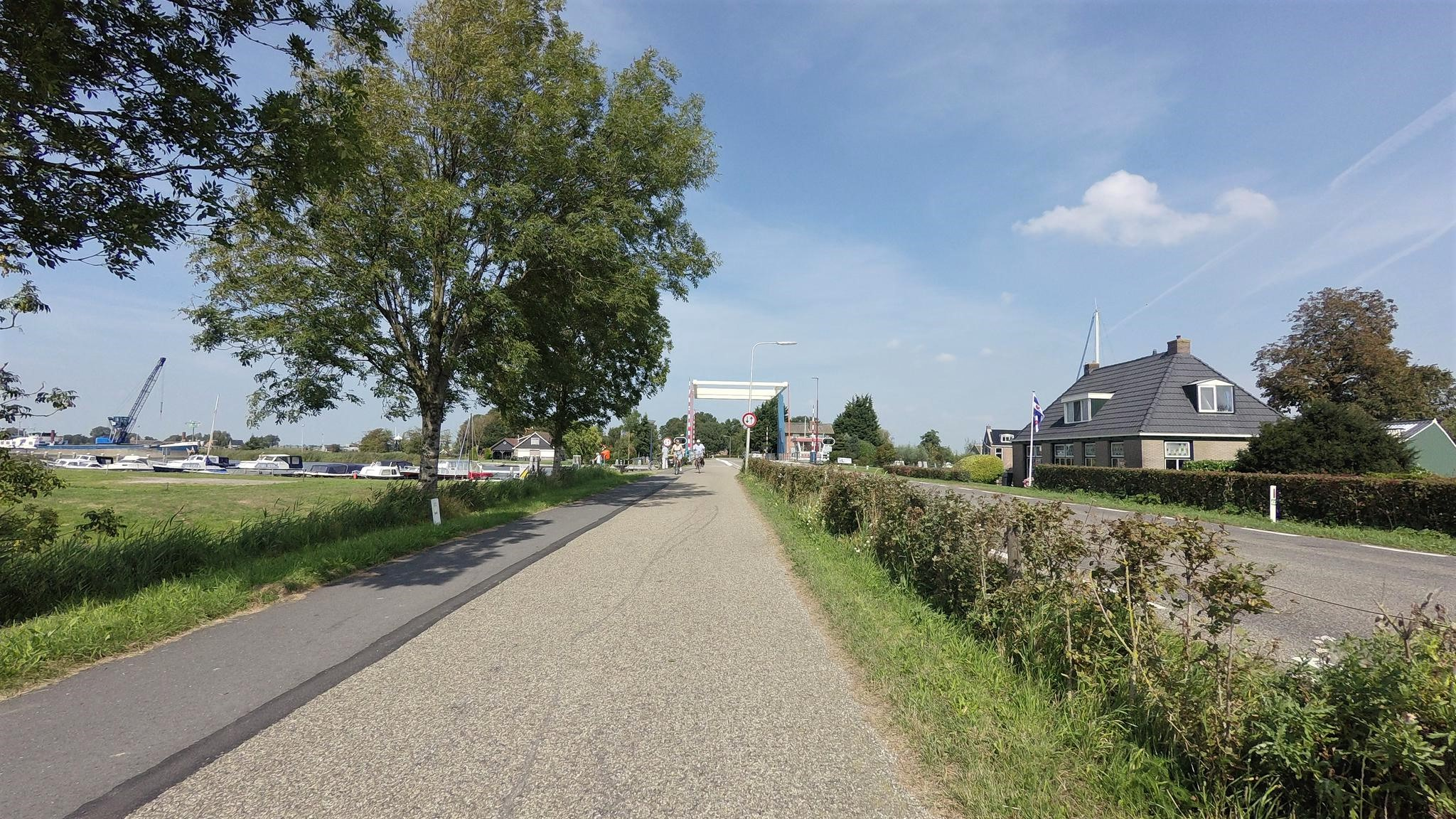
Street view

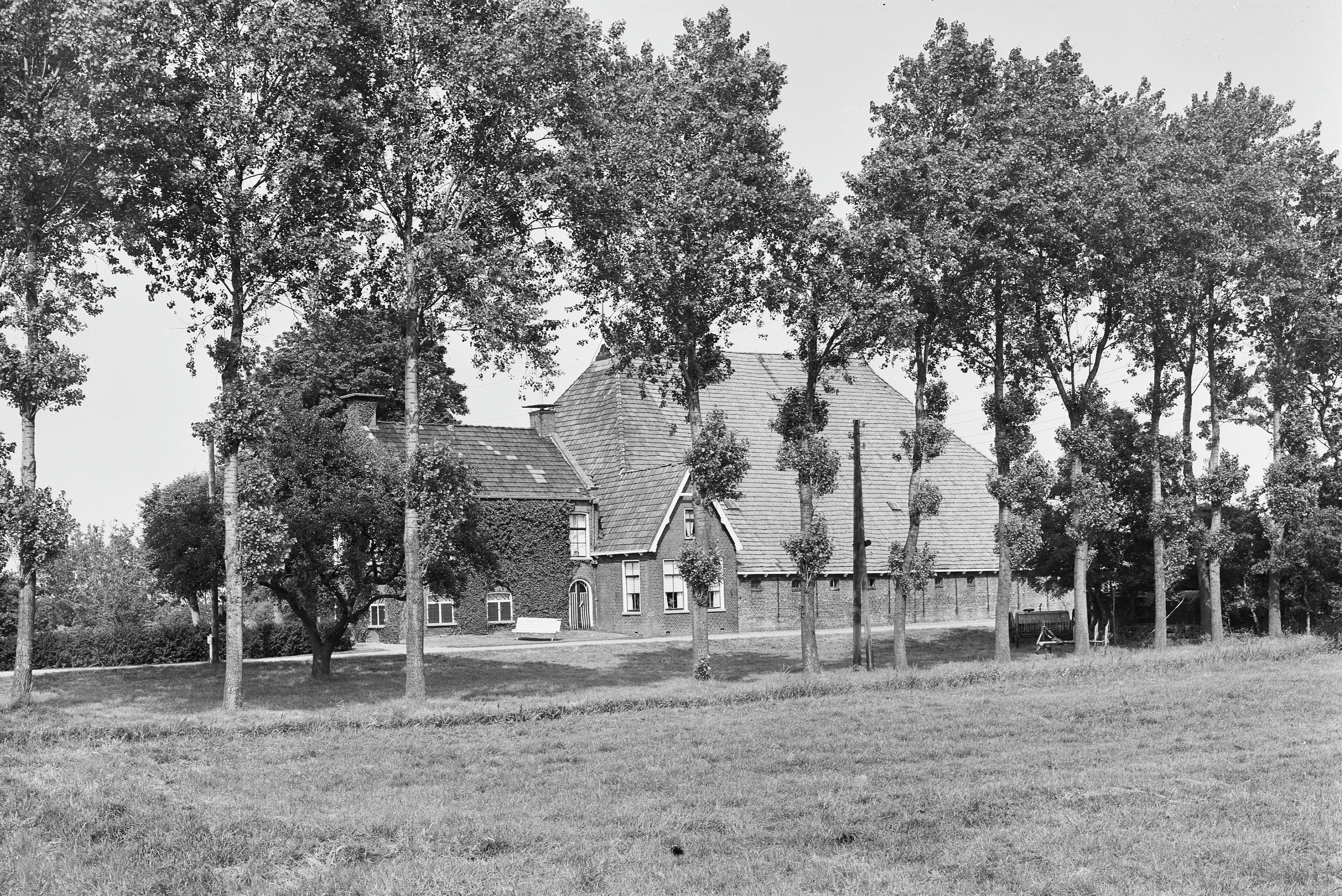
Farm near Follega

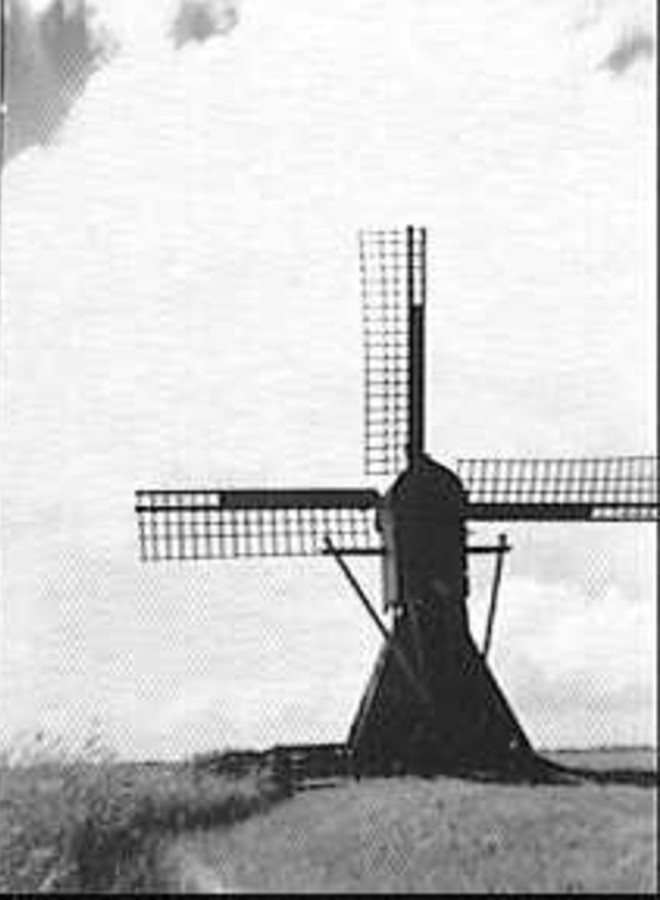
Windmill
