= MV Renasa =

Dutch river tanker

History

Netherlands
- Name: Renasa
- Builder: Stocznia Koźle Serwis Sp z o.o., Poland
- Yard number: 1030
- Launched: 1999
- Status: In service

General characteristics
- Class & type: River tanker
- Length: 85 m (278 ft 10 in)
- Beam: 9.50 m (31 ft 2 in)
- Draught: 4.70 m (15 ft 5 in)

MV Renasa is a Dutch river tanker which was involved in an accident on 9 January 2004 which demolished a windmill.

== History ==
Renasa was built by Stocznia Koźle Serwis Sp z o.o., (now Damen Shipyards Koźle) and launched in 1999.

== Accident ==
On 9 January 2004, Renasa was involved in an accident on the Prinses Margriet Canal that resulted in the De Haensmolen, Grou, Friesland, which stood on the corner of the Pikmeer, being demolished. De Haensmolen has since been repaired and rebuilt in a new position by the Biggemeer.
