= Goëngahuizen =

Goëngahuizen Goaiïngahuzen
- Hamlet
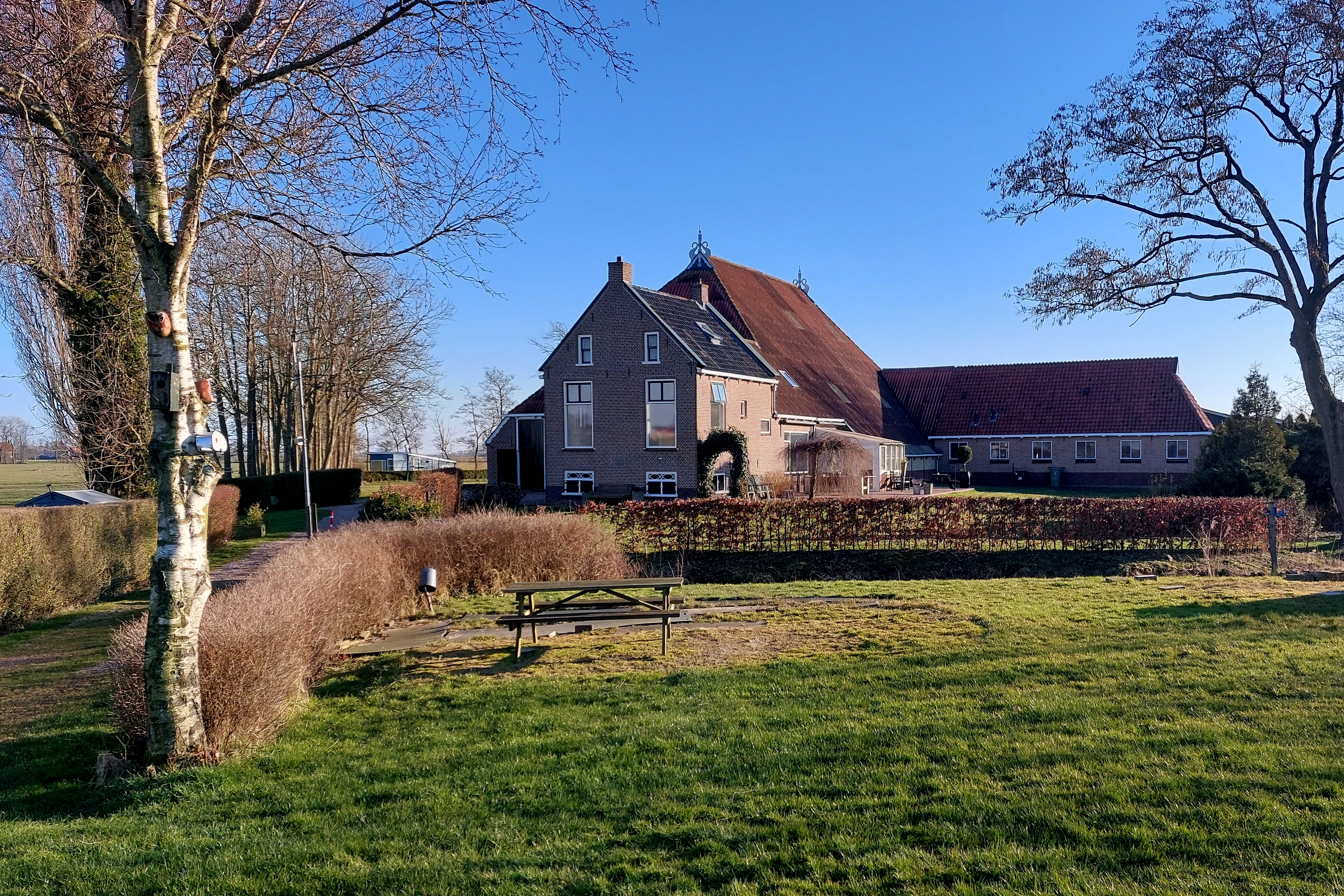
- Farm in Goëngahuizen

- Flag Coat of arms

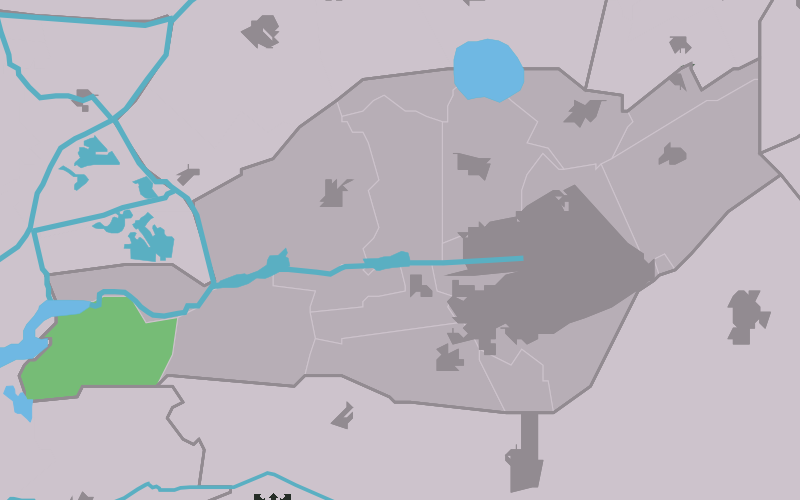
- Location in Smallingerland municipality

- Location in the Netherlands Goëngahuizen (Netherlands)
- Country: Netherlands
- Province: Friesland
- Municipality: Smallingerland

Area
  - Total: 8.48 km^{2} (3.27 sq mi)
- Elevation: −0.4 m (−1.3 ft)

Population (2021)
  - Total: 55
  - Density: 6.5/km^{2} (17/sq mi)
- Time zone: UTC+1 (CET)
  - Summer (DST): UTC+2 (CEST)
- Postal code: 8497
- Dialing code: 0566

Goëngahuizen (West Frisian: Goaiïngahuzen) is a hamlet in Smallingerland in the province of Friesland, the Netherlands. It had a population of around 58 in January 2017.

The village was first mentioned in 1573 as Gonyehuisen, and means "settlement of the Goinga family". Goëngahuizen is an isolated farmers community. Some peat excavation had taken place in the south of Goëngahuizen. It has its own place name signs.

== Windmills ==
There are three windmills in Goëngahuizen, De Jansmolen, De Modderige Bol and Heechheim.

== Gallery ==
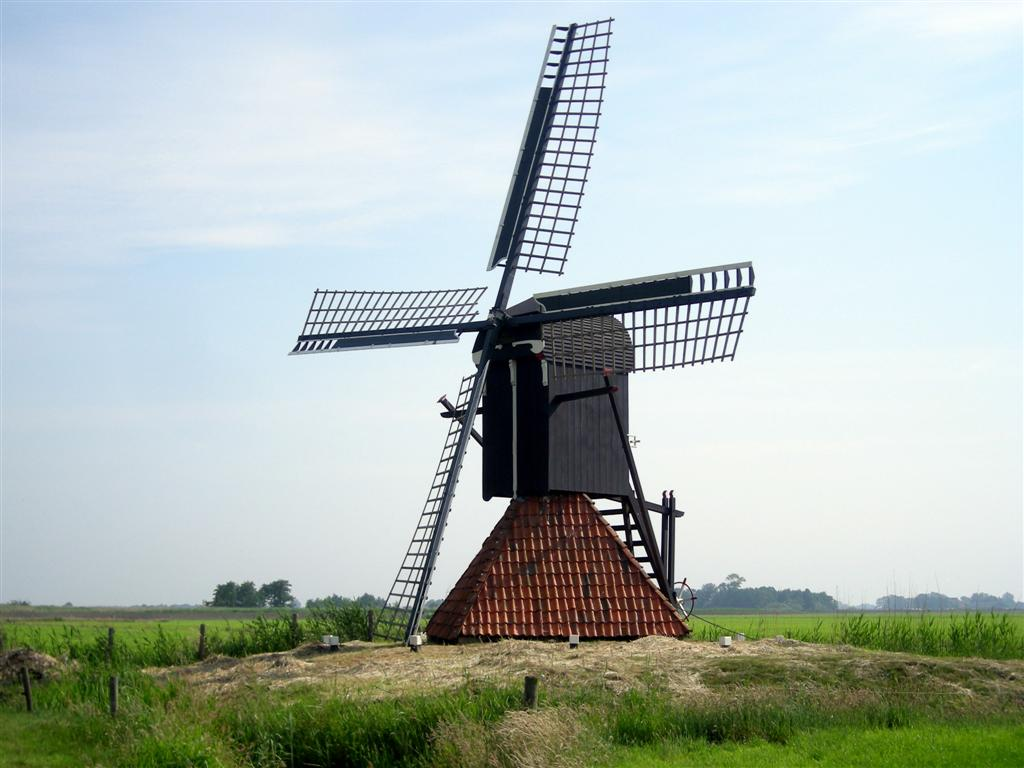
De Jansmolen

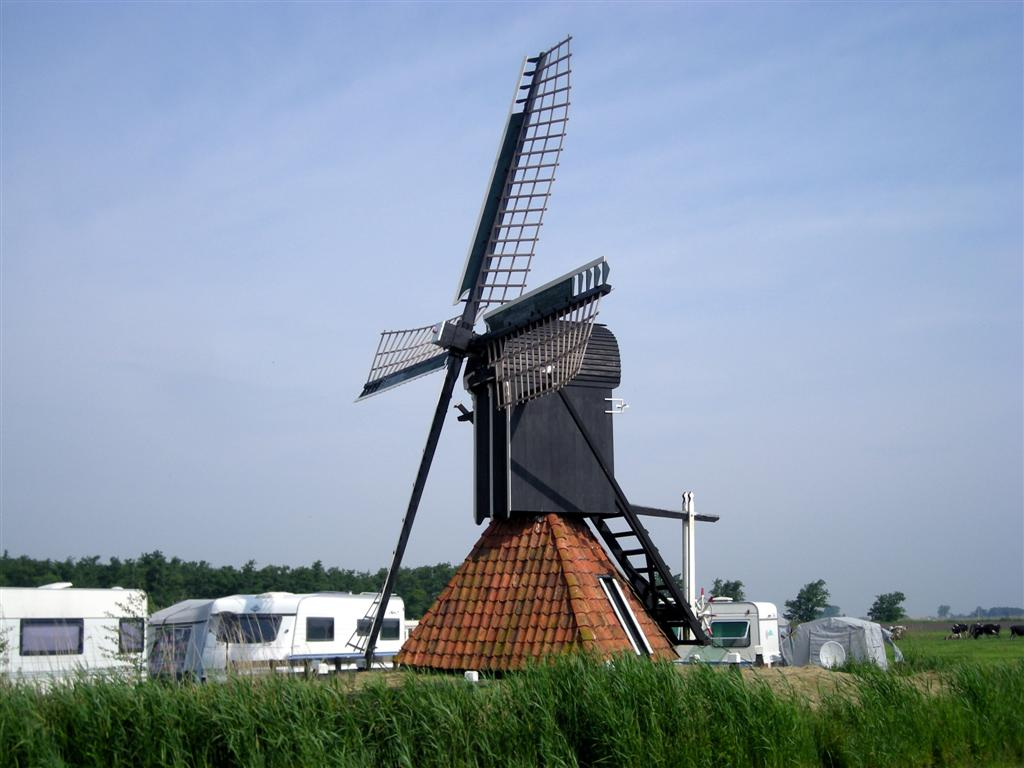
De Modderige Bol

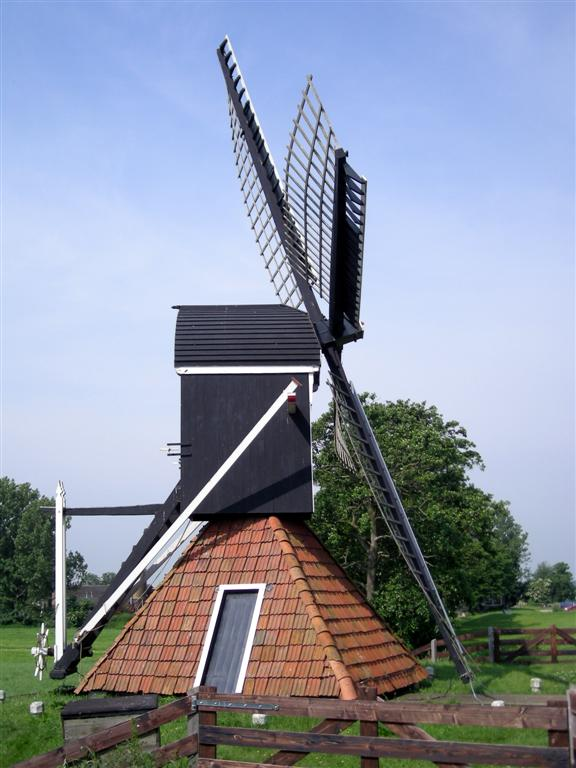
Heechheim
