= Lemsterland =

Lemsterland Lemsterlân
- Former municipality
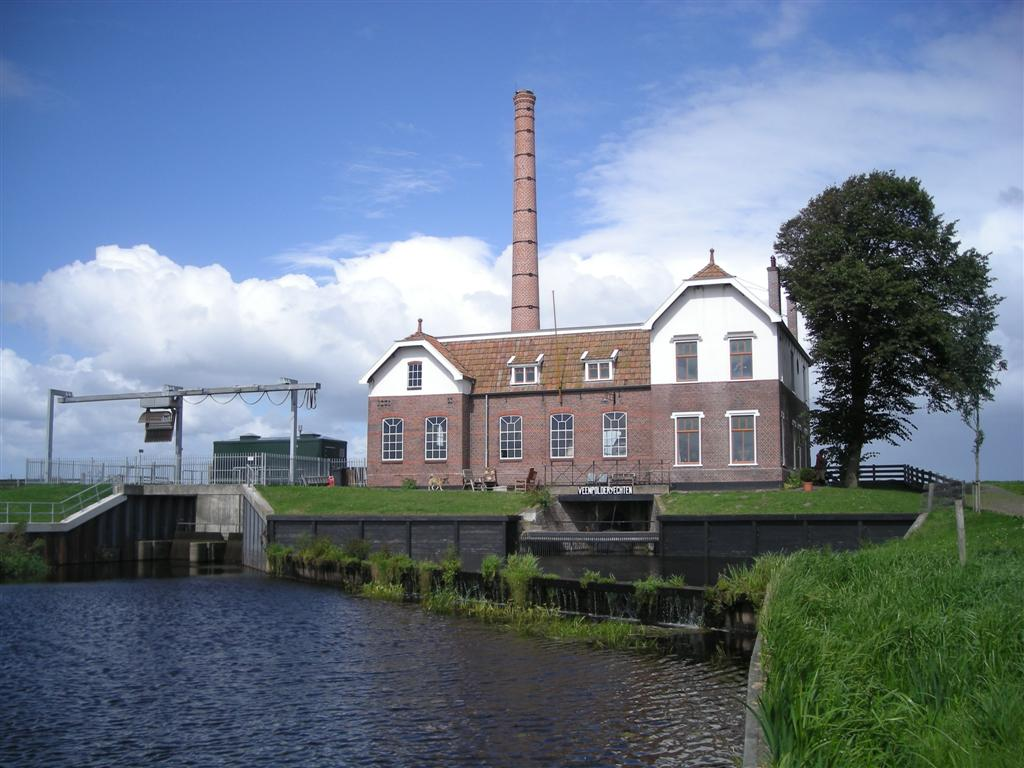
- Pumping station in Echten

- Flag Coat of arms

- Location in Friesland
- Coordinates: 52°51′N 5°43′E
- Country: Netherlands
- Province: Friesland
- Dissolved: 1 January 2014

Area
  - Total: 124.34 km^{2} (48.01 sq mi)
  - Land: 75.93 km^{2} (29.32 sq mi)
  - Water: 48.41 km^{2} (18.69 sq mi)
- Elevation: 0 m (0 ft)

Population (November 2013)
  - Total: 13,544
  - Density: 178/km^{2} (460/sq mi)
- Time zone: UTC+1 (CET)
  - Summer (DST): UTC+2 (CEST)
- Postcode: 8508, 8530–8539
- Area code: 0514

Lemsterland (Dutch: [ˈlɛmstərˌlɑnt]; West Frisian: Lemsterlân) is a former municipality in the northern Netherlands. In 2014 it merged with the municipalities of Skarsterlân and Gaasterlân-Sleat to form the new municipality De Fryske Marren.

== Population centres ==
- Bantega
- Delfstrahuizen
- Echten
- Echtenerbrug
- Eesterga
- Follega
- Lemmer
- Oosterzee
- Oosterzee-Buren
