= Kalenberg =

Kalenberg may refer to:

- The Calenberg, a hill in Lower Saxony, Germany
- Calenberg Castle, a ruined castle on the Calenberg hill in Germany
- Principality of Calenberg, a state in the Holy Roman Empire
- Kalenberg, Overijssel, a small village in the Netherlands
- Kalenberg, Drenthe, a hamlet in the Netherlands
- Kalenberg (Mechernich), a district in the town of Mechernich, district of Euskirchen, North Rhine-Westphalia, Germany

== People with the surname ==
- Josef Kalenberg (1886–1962), German opera singer (tenor); see Mârouf, savetier du Caire
- Paula Kalenberg (born 1986), German actress

== See also ==
- Calenberg (disambiguation)
- Kahlenberg
