= Oosterzee-Buren =

Coordinates: 52°52′6″N 5°44′53″E

- Village
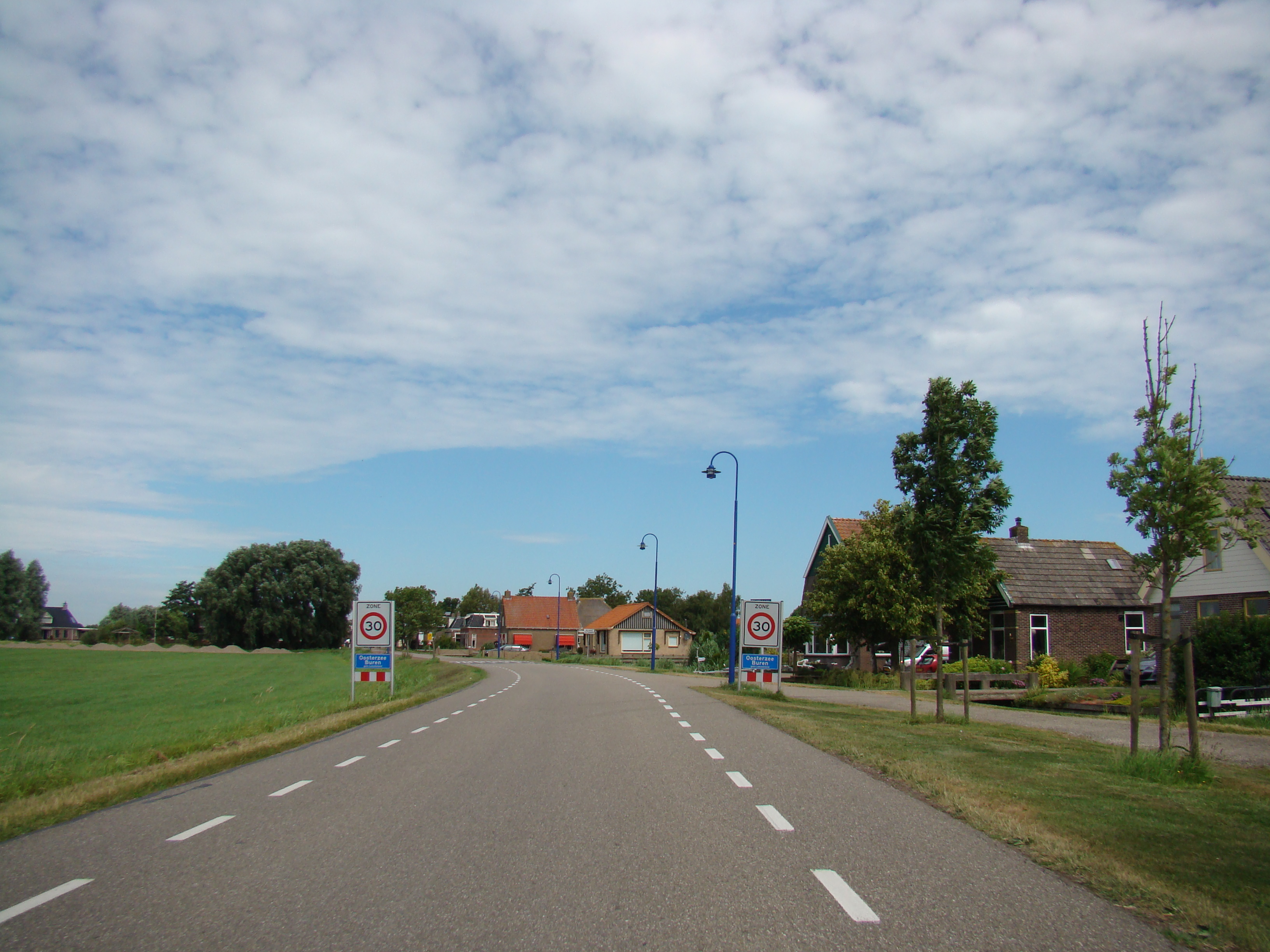
- Country: Netherlands
- Province: Friesland

Population
  - Total: c. 350

Oosterzee-Buren (West Frisian: Eastersee-Buorren) is a village in Lemsterland in the province of Friesland, the Netherlands. It had a population of around 350 in 2004.
