= Calenberg (disambiguation) =

Calenberg may refer to:

- Calenberg, the hill in Lower Saxony, Germany, and site of Calenberg Castle
- Principality of Calenberg, a former German state within the Duchy of Brunswick-Lüneburg
- Calenberg Castle, a ruined castle, formerly the seat of the House of Hanover
- Calenberg Land, a historic landscape south of Hanover in Germany
- Calenberg Uplands, part of the Weser-Leine Uplands in central Germany
