= Echtenerbrug =

Echtenerbrug Ychtenbrêge
- Village
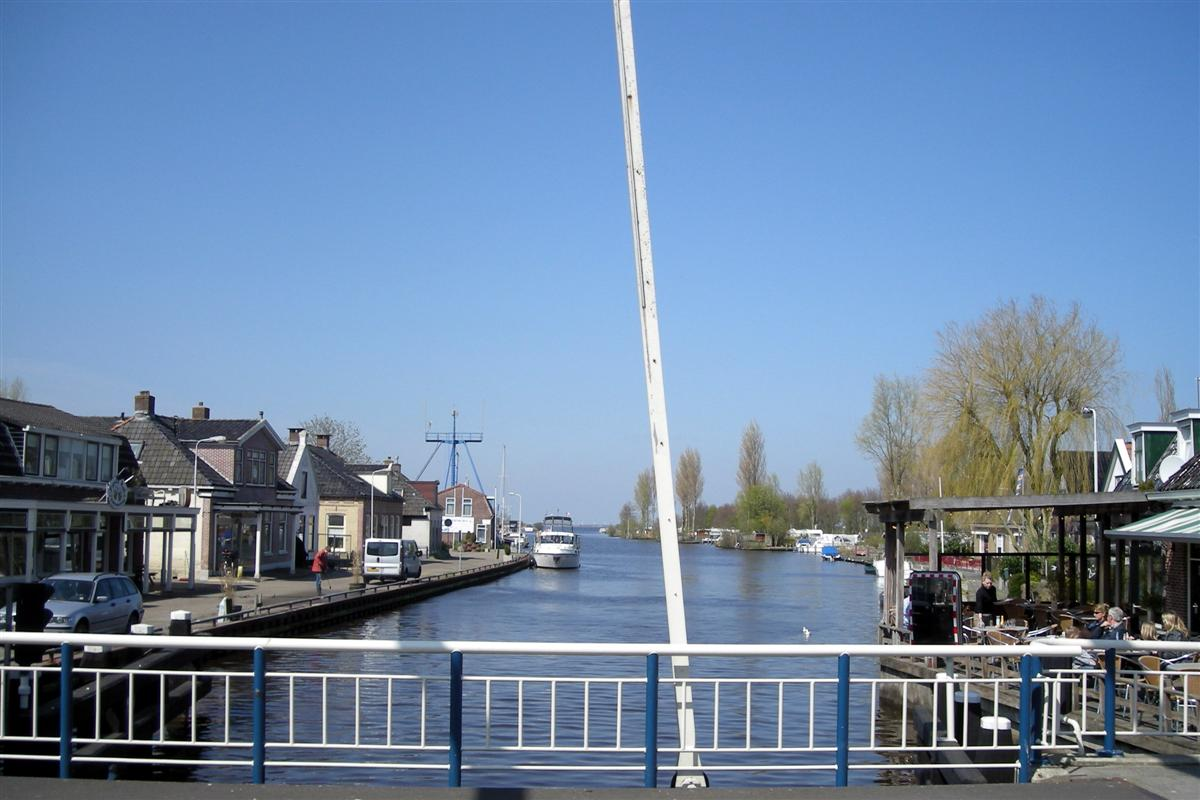

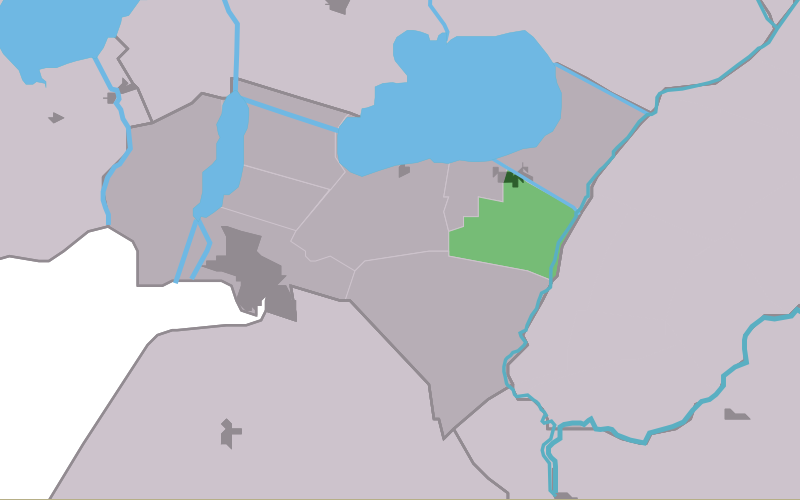
- Location in the former Lemsterlân municipality

- Location in the Netherlands Echtenerbrug (Netherlands)
- Country: Netherlands
- Province: Friesland
- Municipality: De Fryske Marren

Area
  - Total: 6.61 km^{2} (2.55 sq mi)
- Elevation: −0.3 m (−0.98 ft)

Population (2021)
  - Total: 1,005
  - Density: 152/km^{2} (394/sq mi)
- Time zone: UTC+1 (CET)
  - Summer (DST): UTC+2 (CEST)
- Postal code: 8539
- Dialing code: 0514

Echtenerbrug (West Frisian: Ychtenbrêge) is a small village in De Fryske Marren in the province of Friesland, the Netherlands. It has a population of around 1035 including surrounding area.

The villages of Delfstrahuizen and Echtenerbrug are separated by a canal.

== History ==
The village was first mentioned in 1718 as Echterbrug, and means bridge near Echten. Echtenerbrug is a road village which developed in the Middle Ages to the east of Echten.

== Gallery ==
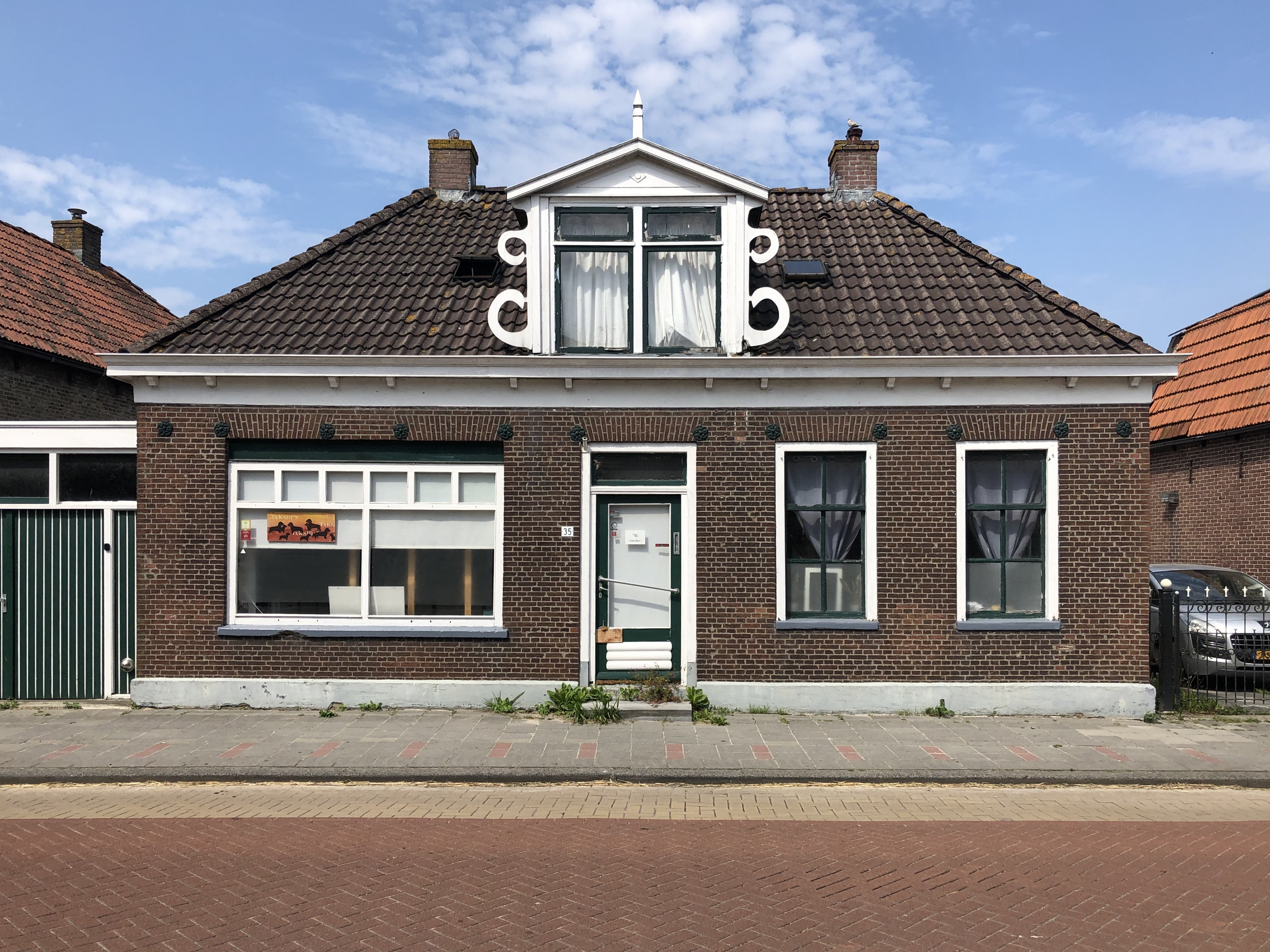
House in Echtenerbrug

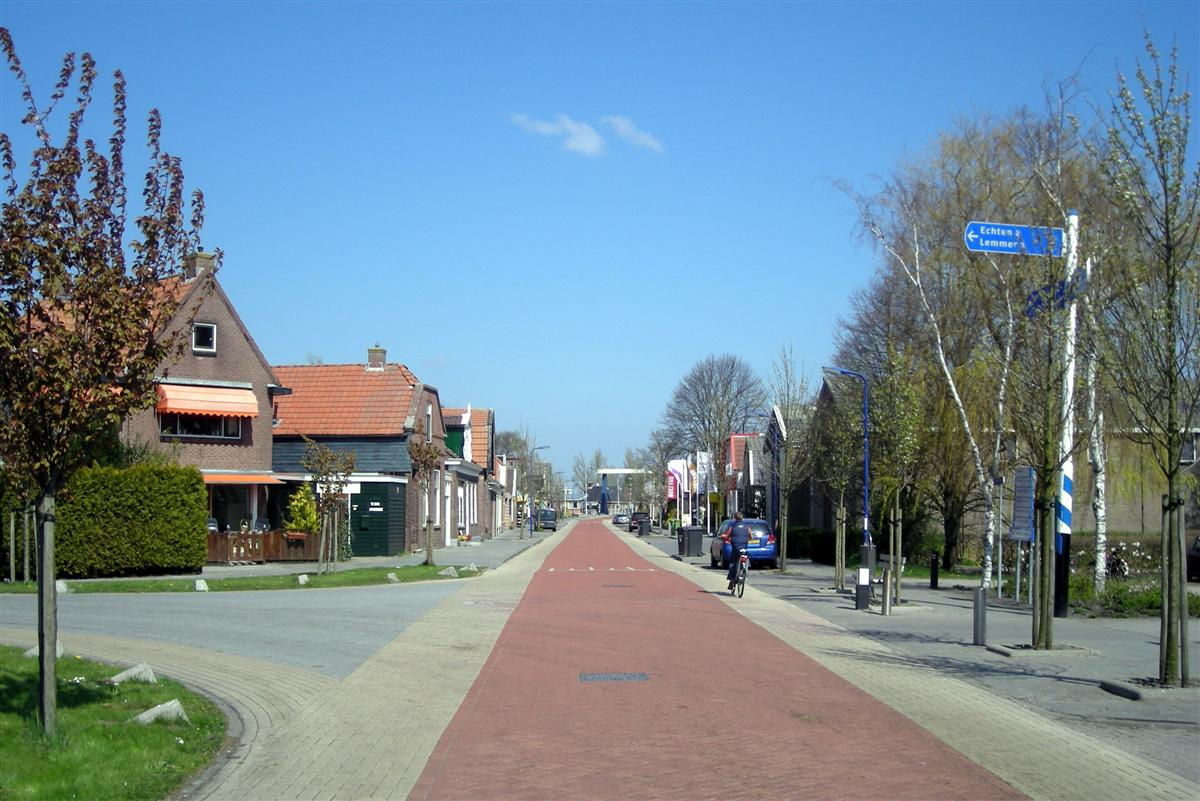
Street view

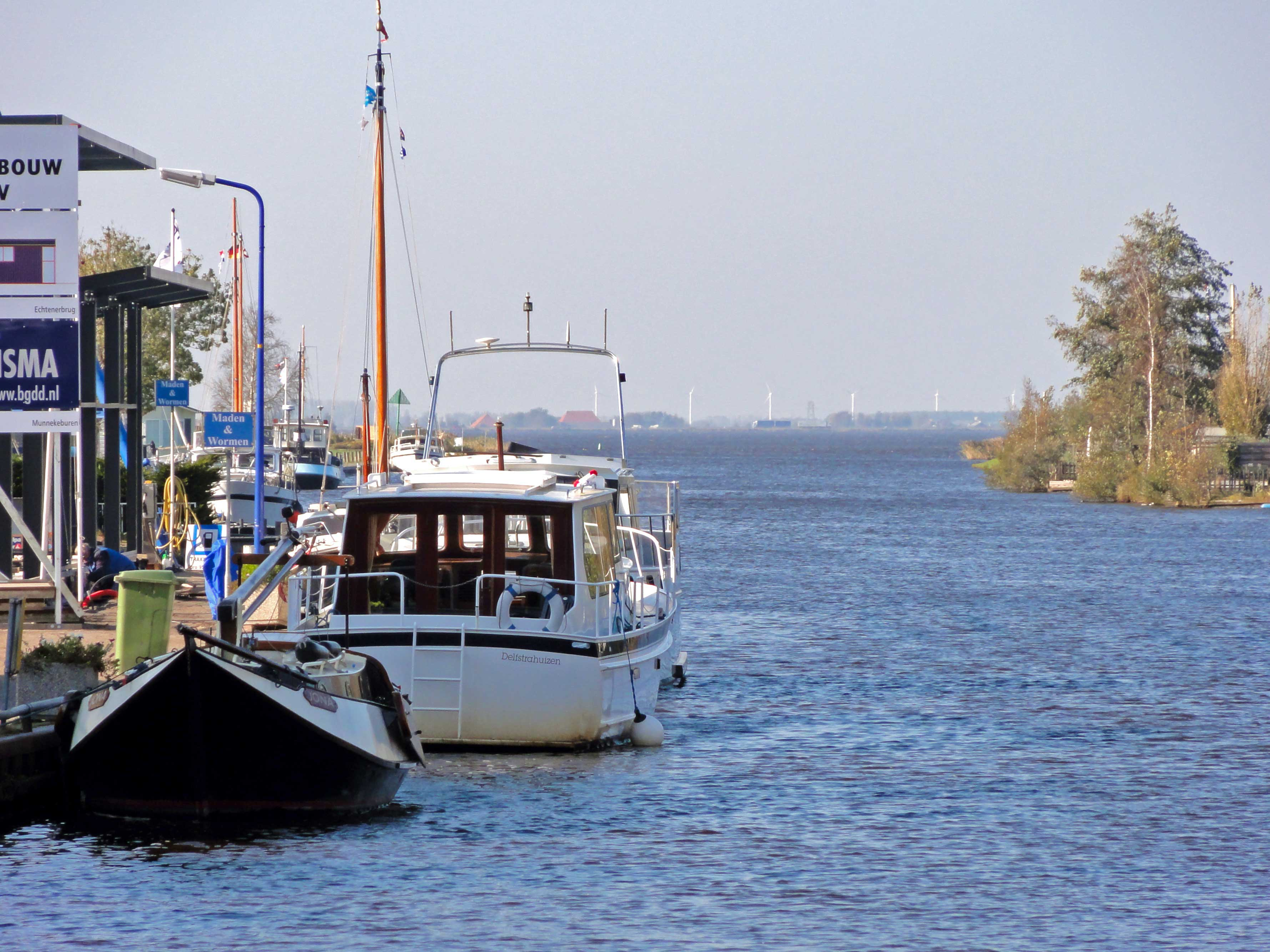
Looking towards Tjeukemeer

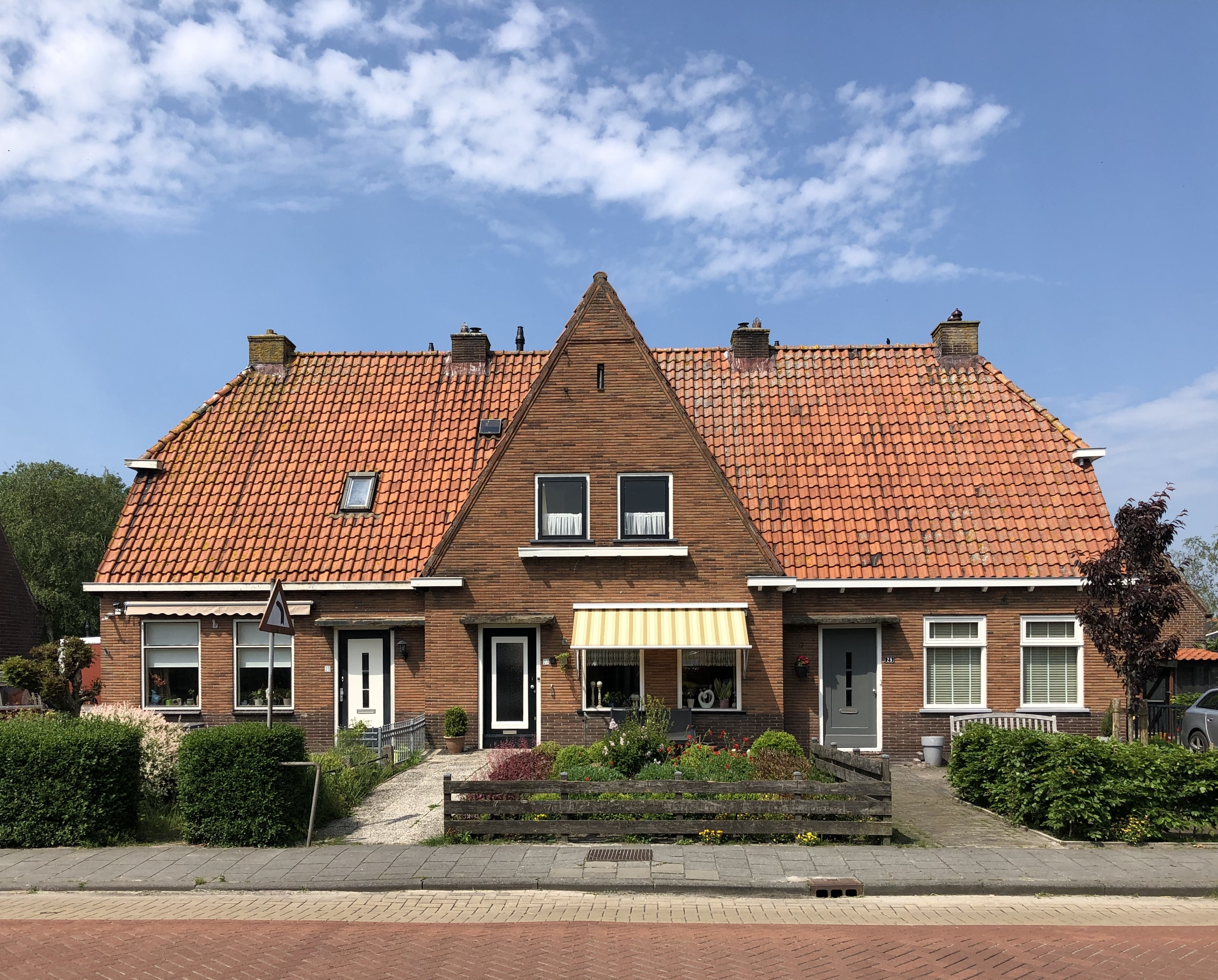
House in Echtenerbrug
