= Eesterga =

Eesterga Jistergea
- Village
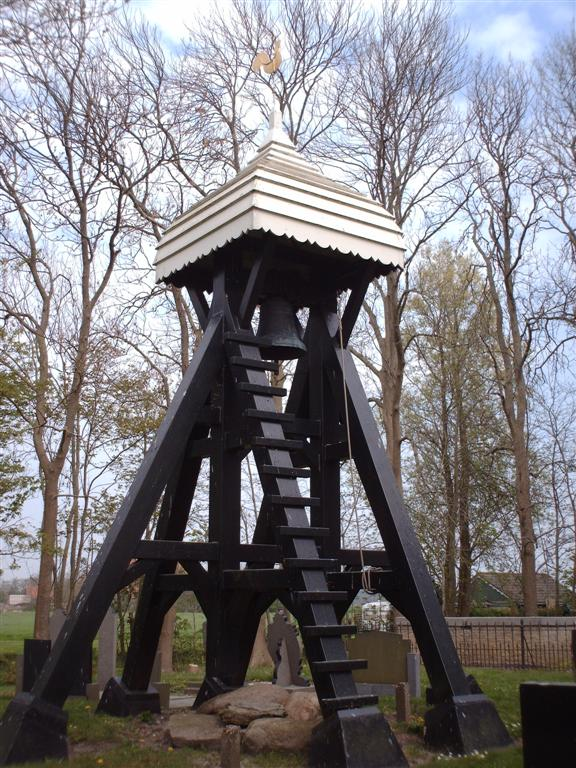
- Eesterga Bell Tower

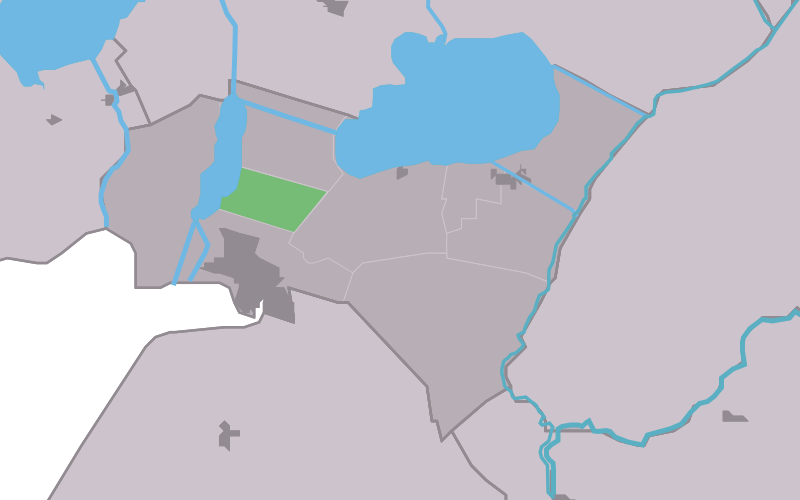
- Location in the former Lemsterlân municipality

- Location in the Netherlands Eesterga (Netherlands)
- Country: Netherlands
- Province: Friesland
- Municipality: De Fryske Marren

Area
  - Total: 3.72 km^{2} (1.44 sq mi)
- Elevation: −0.5 m (−1.6 ft)

Population (2021)
  - Total: 45
  - Density: 12/km^{2} (31/sq mi)
- Time zone: UTC+1 (CET)
  - Summer (DST): UTC+2 (CEST)
- Postal code: 8534
- Dialing code: 0514

Eesterga (West Frisian: Jistergea) is a small village in De Fryske Marren in the province of Friesland, the Netherlands. It had a population of around 45 in 2017.

== History ==
The village was first mentioned in 1505 as Eestergae. The etymology is unclear. It used to have a church, but it was demolished in 1740. In 1840, it was home to 143 people.

Before 2014 it was part of the Lemsterland municipality.

== Gallery ==
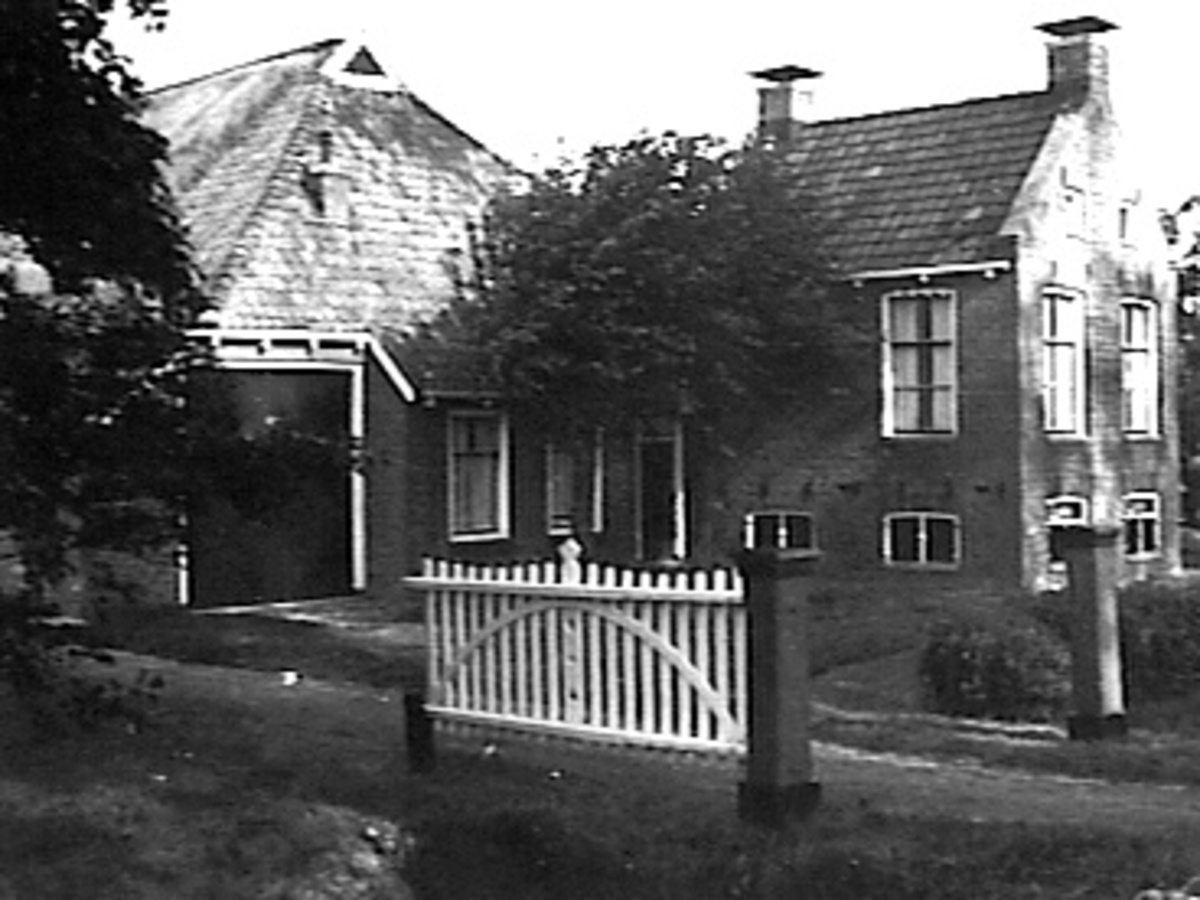
Farm in Eesterga

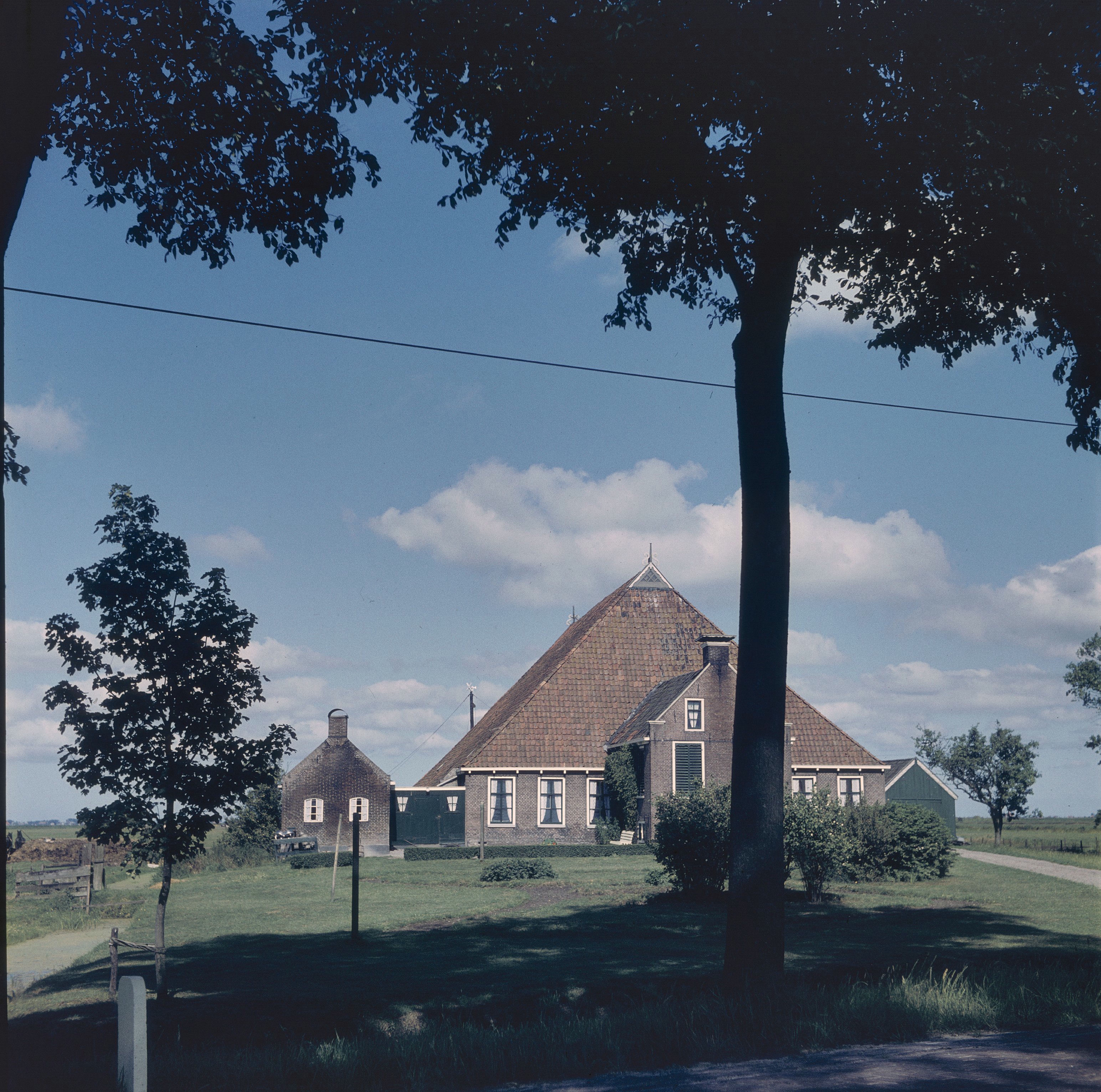
Farm in Eesterga
