= Bantega =

Bantega Bantegea
- Village
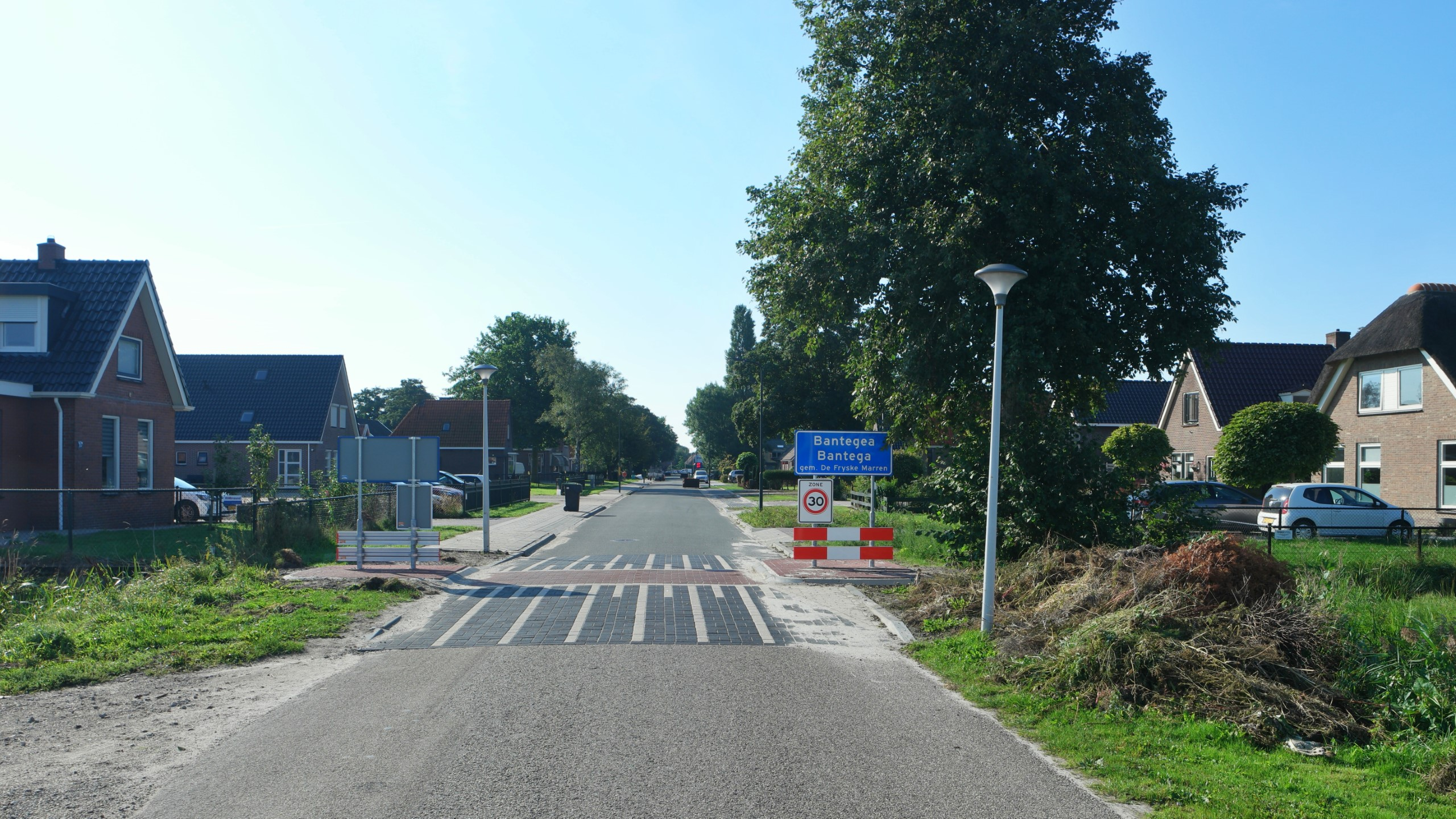

- Flag

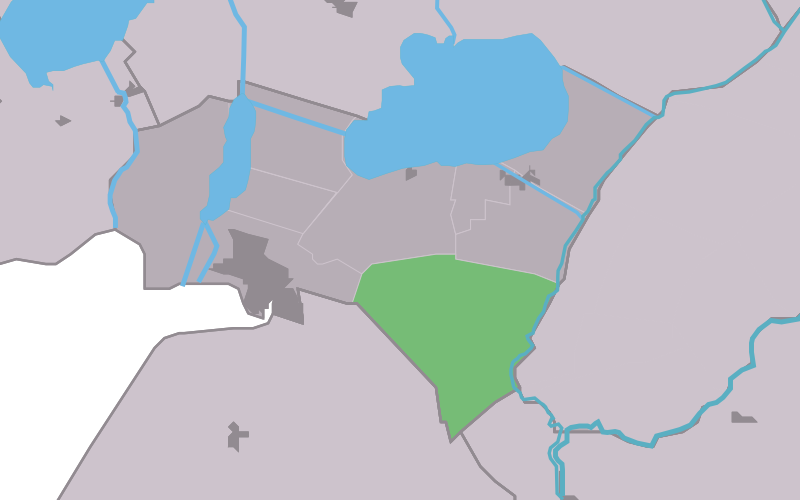
- Location in the former Lemsterlân municipality

- Location in the Netherlands Bantega (Netherlands)
- Country: Netherlands
- Province: Friesland
- Municipality: De Fryske Marren

Area
  - Total: 19.80 km^{2} (7.64 sq mi)
- Elevation: −0.7 m (−2.3 ft)

Population (2021)
  - Total: 655
  - Density: 33.1/km^{2} (85.7/sq mi)
- Time zone: UTC+1 (CET)
  - Summer (DST): UTC+2 (CEST)
- Postal code: 8538
- Dialing code: 0514

Bantega (West Frisian: Bantegea) is a village in the Dutch province of Friesland. It is located in the municipality De Fryske Marren, and lies about 6 km east of the town of Lemmer.

Bantega has about 650 inhabitants. It is a young village; until after the second World War, it was only a hamlet, named Echtenpolder. The village is named after the drowned village of Bant.

The village was first named Bantega in 1974. The older name of the settlement was Echtenpolder, but was renamed after a village which disappeared around 1700. It means "village of Bant (area name)". In 1916, a little wooden church was bought from Kalenberg. In 1944, the floor collapsed during service. A new church was built in 1947.

== Gallery ==
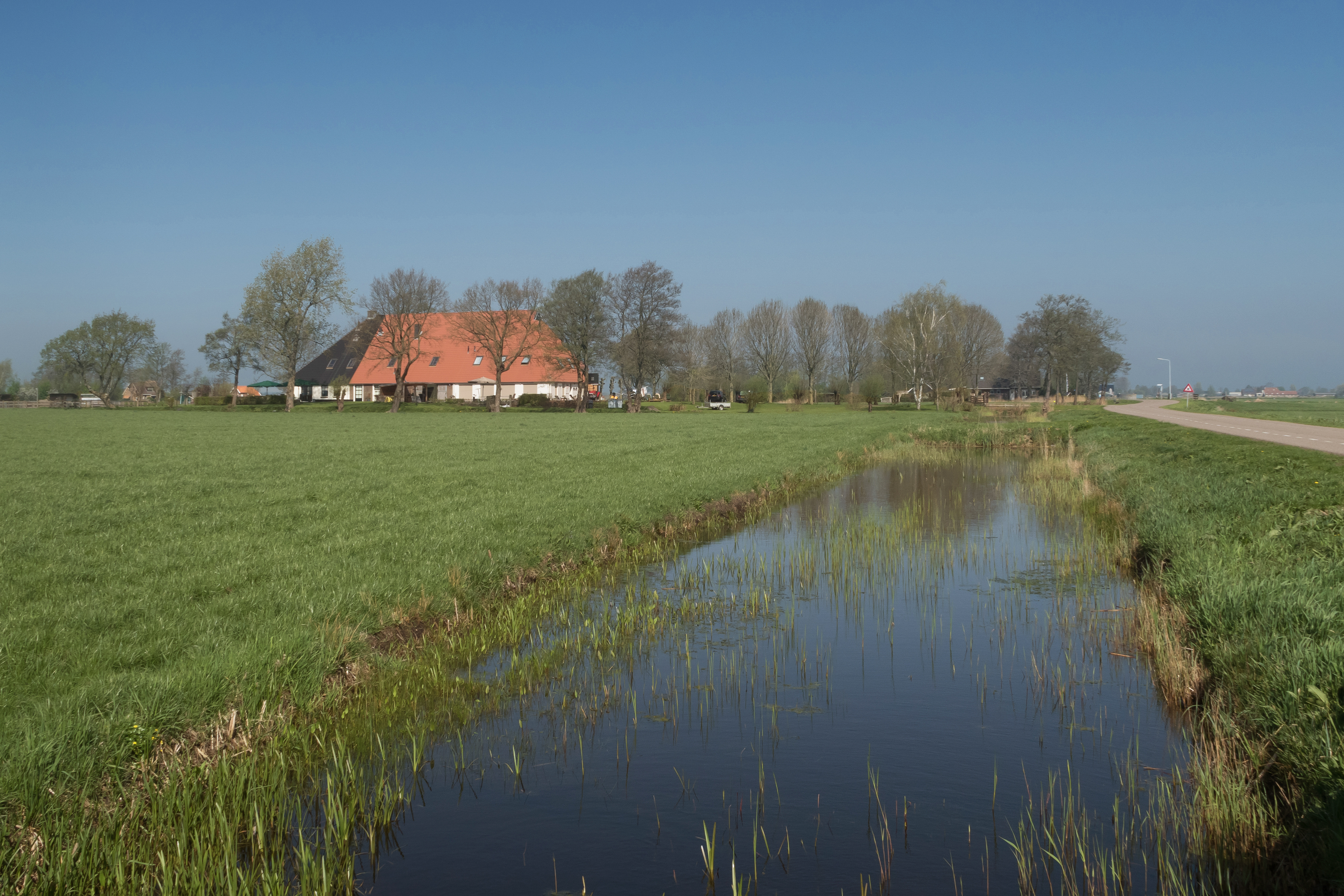
Bed and breakfast at the Middenweg

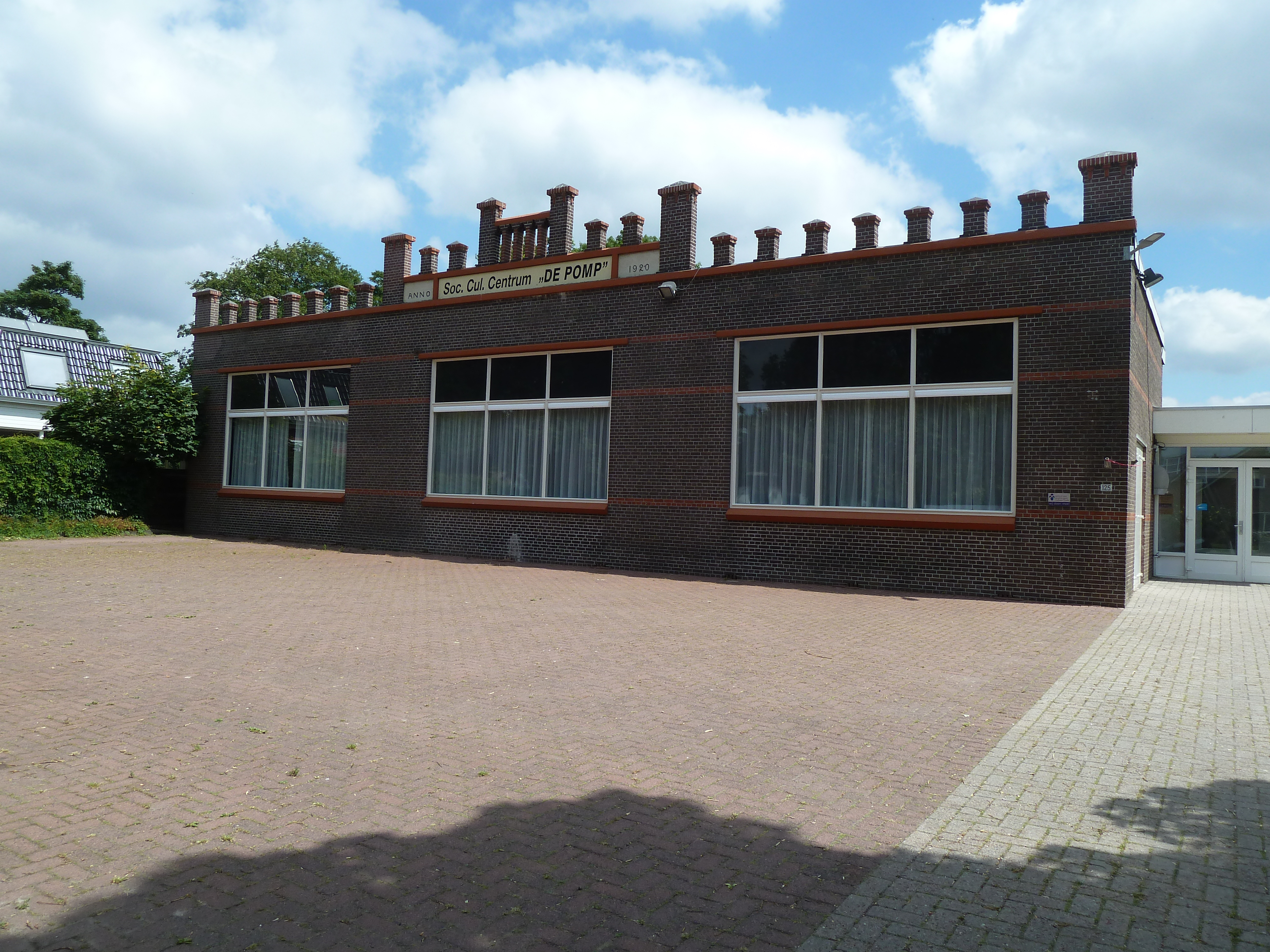
School in Bantega

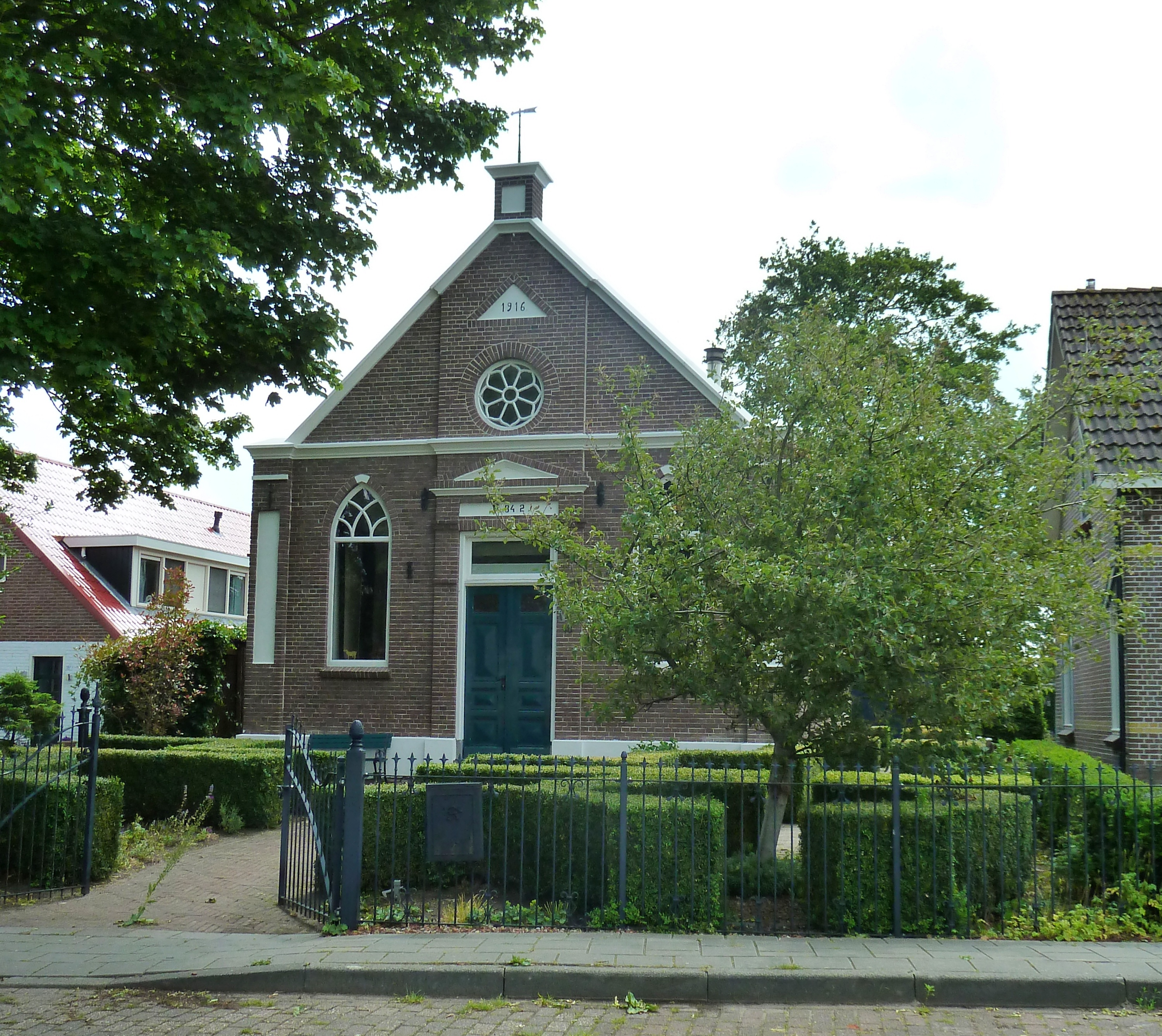
Former church

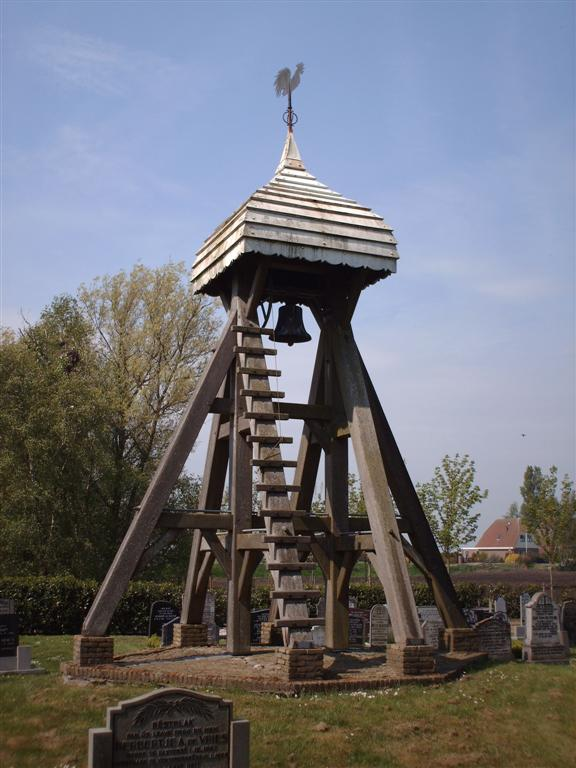
The cemetery bell
