= Delfstrahuizen =

Delfstrahuizen Dolsterhuzen
- Village
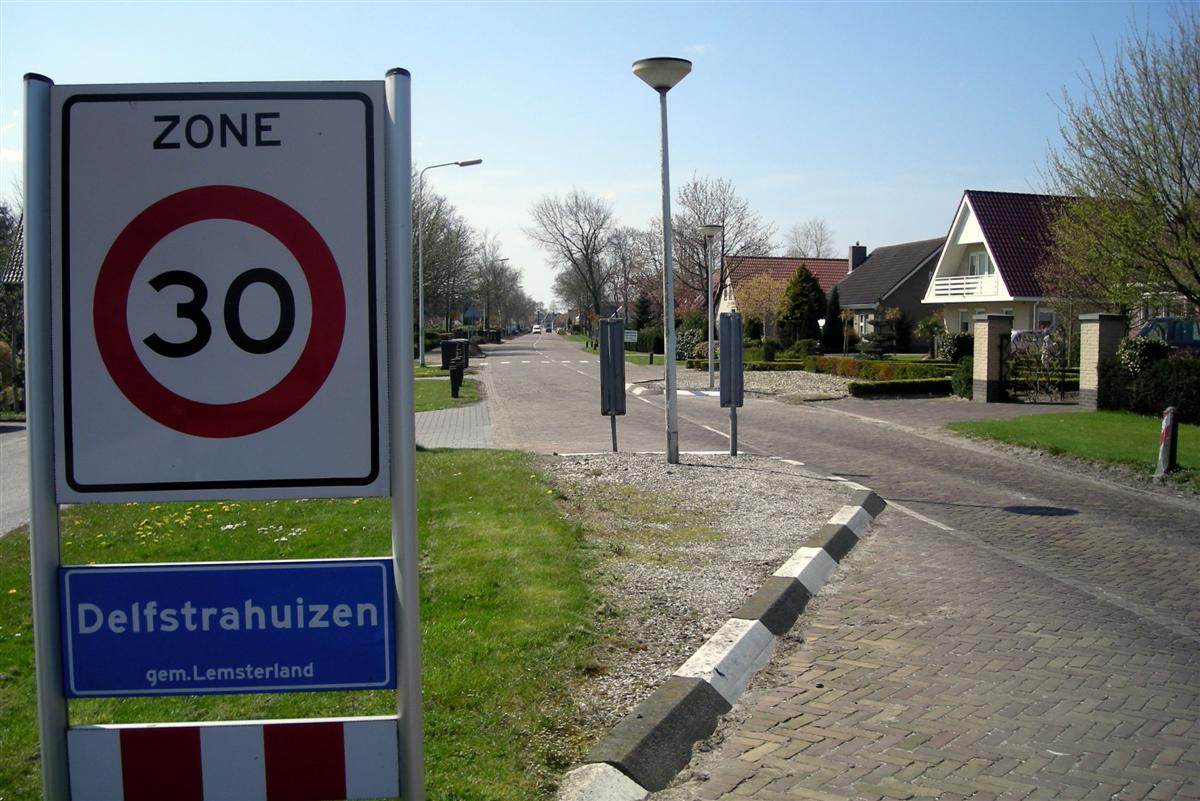

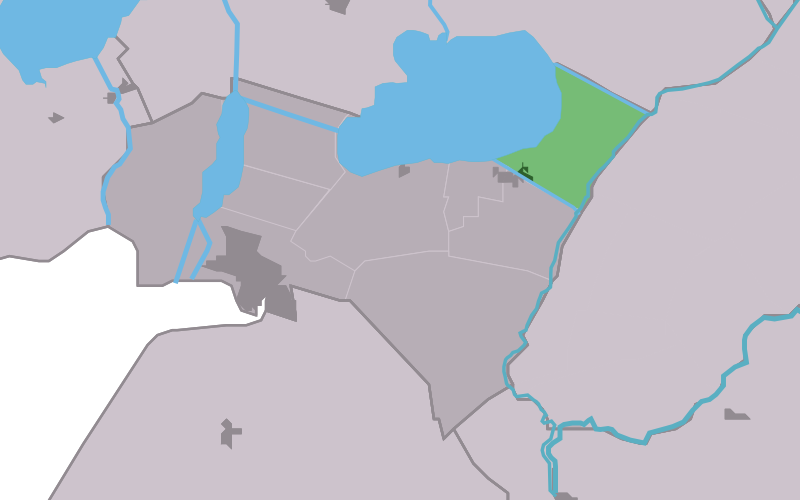
- Location in the former Lemsterlân municipality

- Location in the Netherlands Delfstrahuizen (Netherlands)
- Country: Netherlands
- Province: Friesland
- Municipality: De Fryske Marren

Area
  - Total: 14.61 km^{2} (5.64 sq mi)
- Elevation: −0.1 m (−0.33 ft)

Population (2021)
  - Total: 455
  - Density: 31.1/km^{2} (80.7/sq mi)
- Time zone: UTC+1 (CET)
  - Summer (DST): UTC+2 (CEST)
- Postal code: 8508
- Dialing code: 0514

Delfstrahuizen (West Frisian: Dolsterhuzen) is a small village in De Fryske Marren in the province of Friesland, the Netherlands. It had a population of around 380 including the surrounding area in 2017.

== History ==
The village was first mentioned in 1408 as Nye Delfsterhuisen, and means settlement near a dug canal. The villages of Delfstrahuizen and Echtenerbrug are separated by a canal. The area around Delfstrahuizen used to be a forest, but was cultivated during the 19th century. In 1840, Delfstrahuizen was home to 287 people. The Dutch Reformed Church dates from 1908. The previous church used to be located near the cemetery, however there are no records what it looked like.

Before 1934, Delfstrahuizen was part of the Schoterland municipality.

== Gallery ==
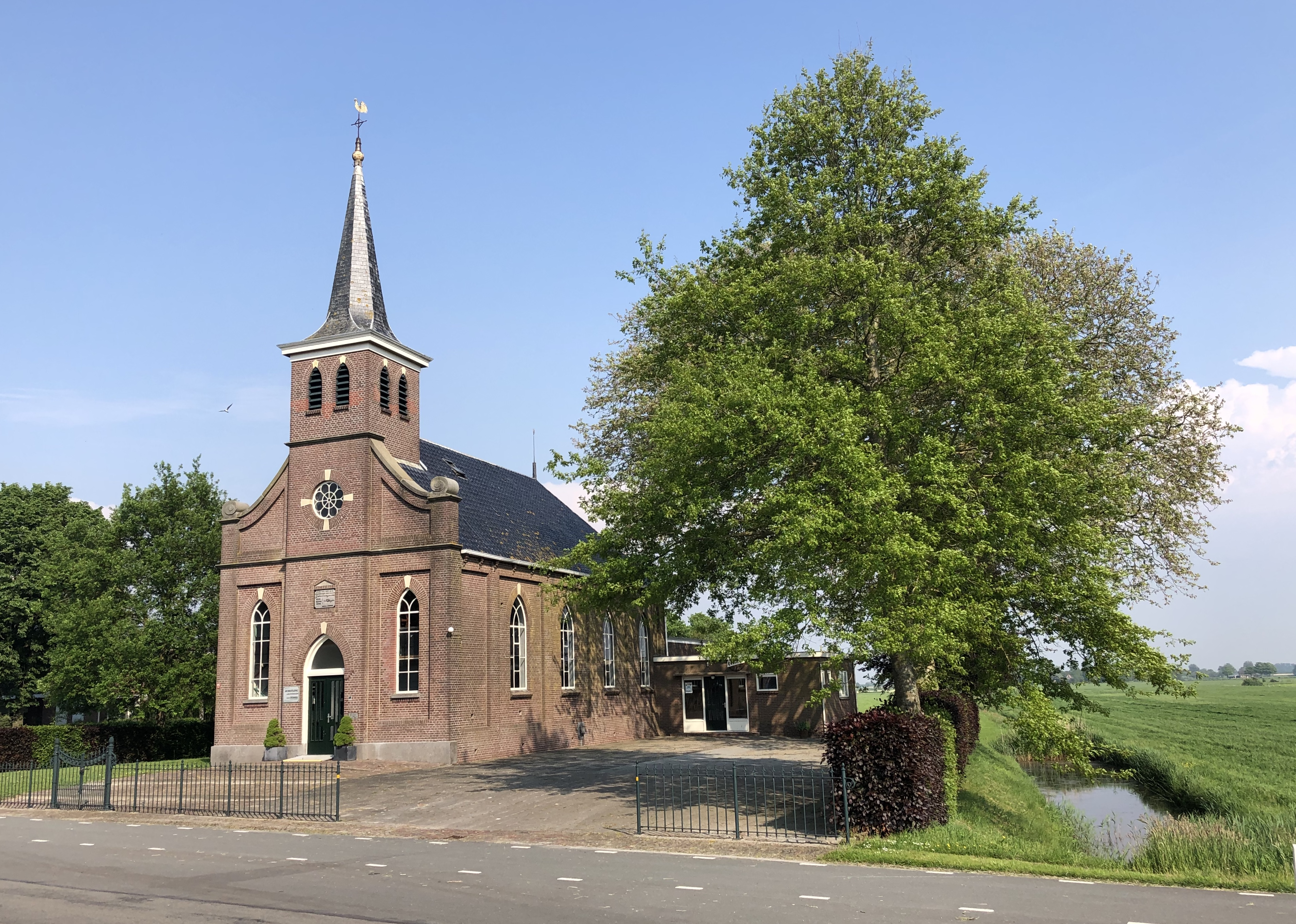
St Jacob Church

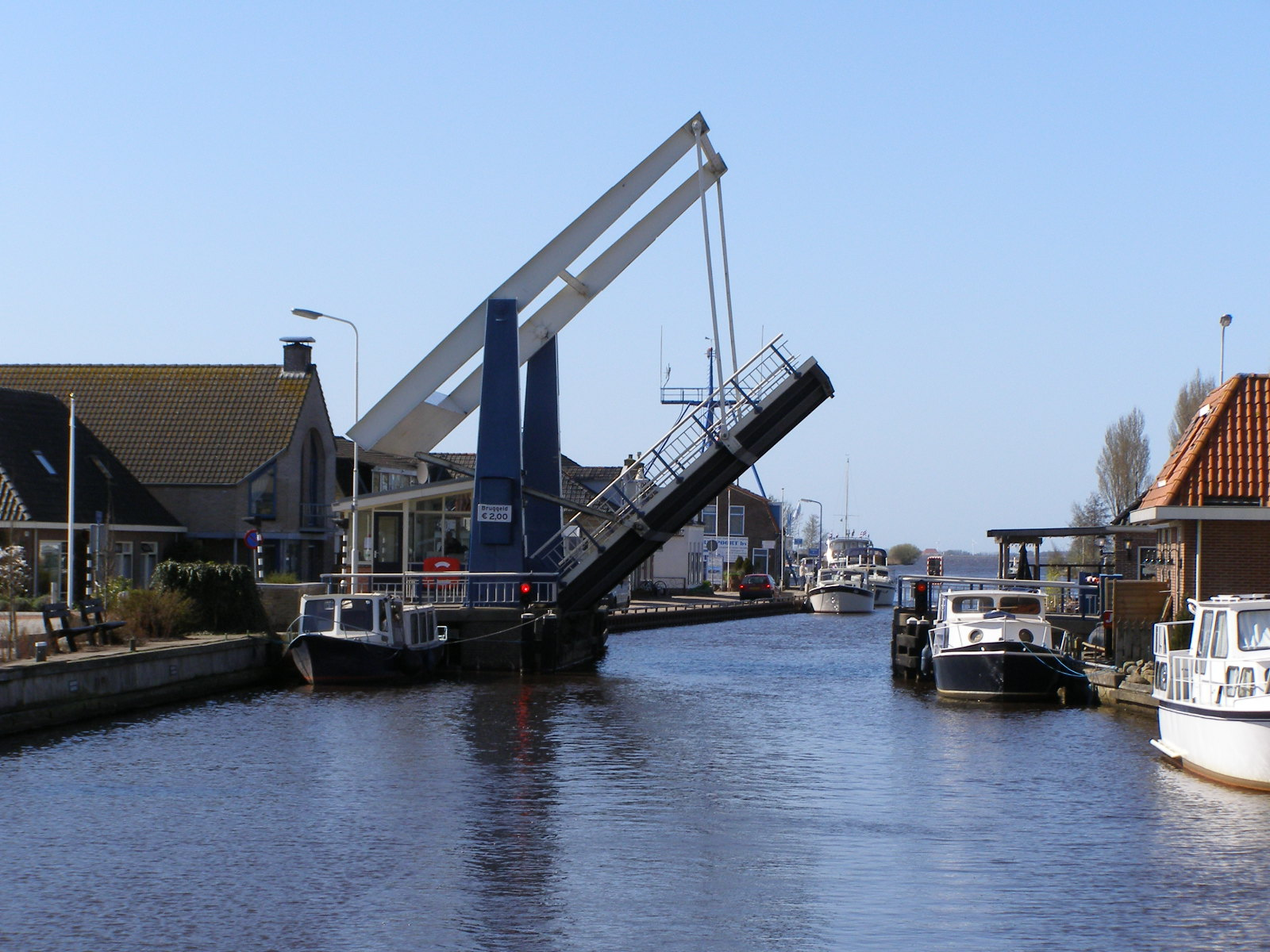
Bridge

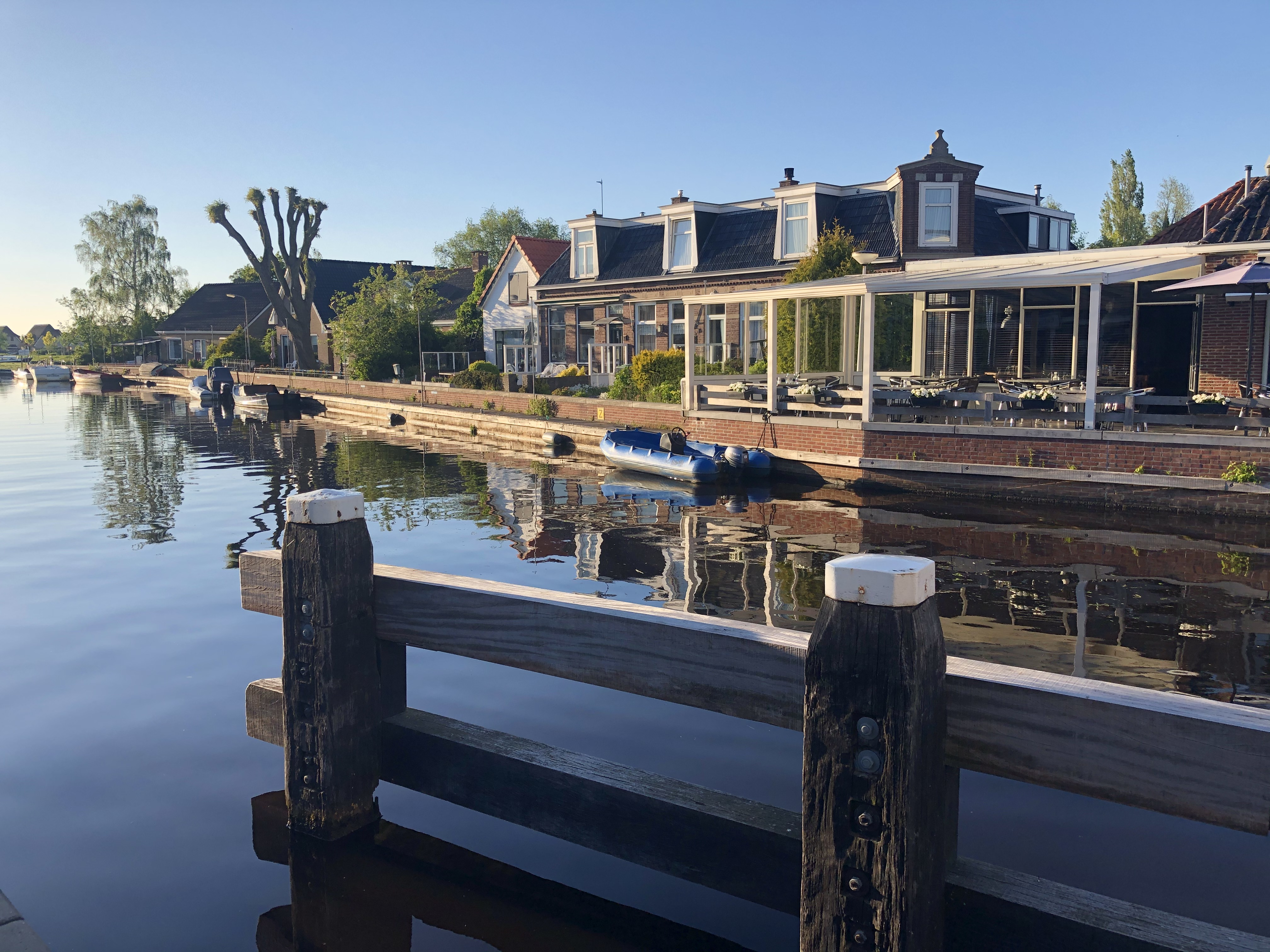
Canal view

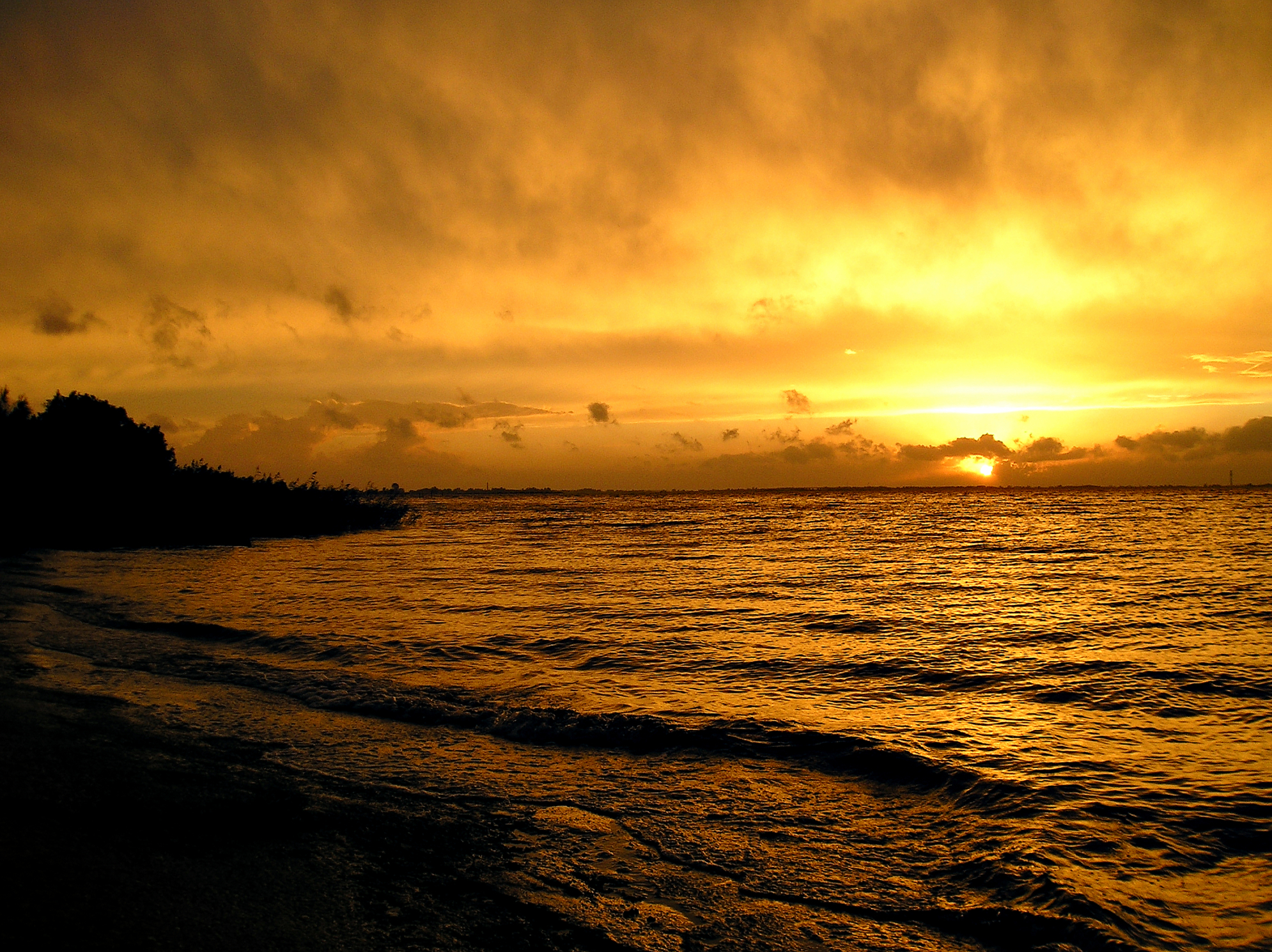
Sunset over the Tjeukemeer
