= Kalenberg, Drenthe =

Hamlet in the northeastern Netherlands

Kalenberg
- Hamlet
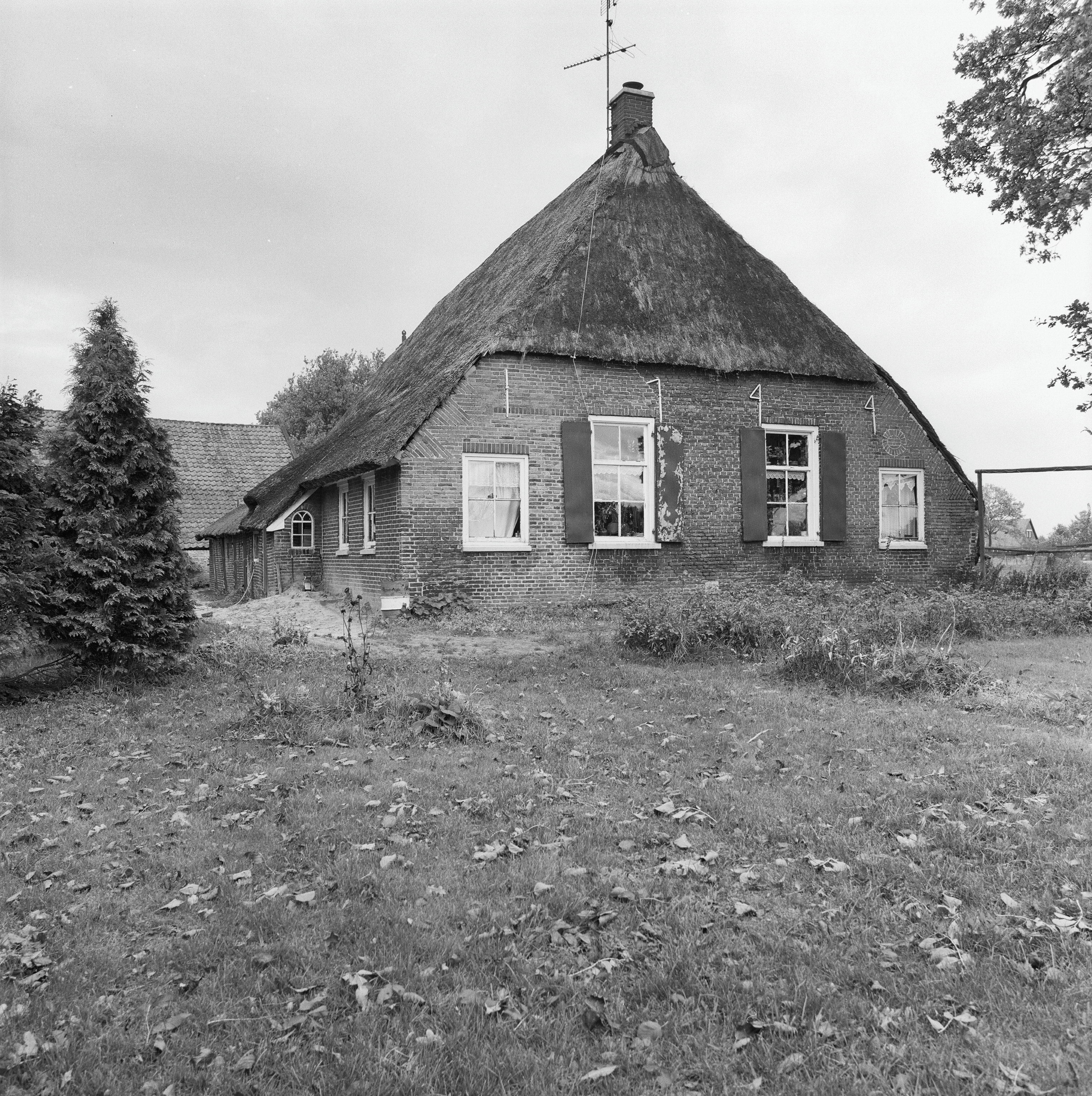
- Farm in Kalenberg

- Location in province of Drenthe in the Netherlands Kalenberg (Netherlands)
- Coordinates: 52°44′18″N 6°26′20″E
- Country: Netherlands
- Province: Drenthe
- Municipality: Hoogeveen
- Elevation: 11 m (36 ft)
- Time zone: UTC+1 (CET)
  - Summer (DST): UTC+2 (CEST)
- Postal code: 7931
- Dialing code: 0528

Kalenberg is a hamlet in the northeastern Netherlands. It is located in the municipality Hoogeveen, Drenthe, about 4 km northwest of the town of Hogeveen.

It was first mentioned in 1846 as Kalenberg, and means "bare hill". It is not a statistical entity, and the postal authorities have placed it under Fluitenberg. It consists of about 7 houses. Since 2007, it is home to a vineyard.
