= Echten, Friesland =

Echten Ychten
- Village
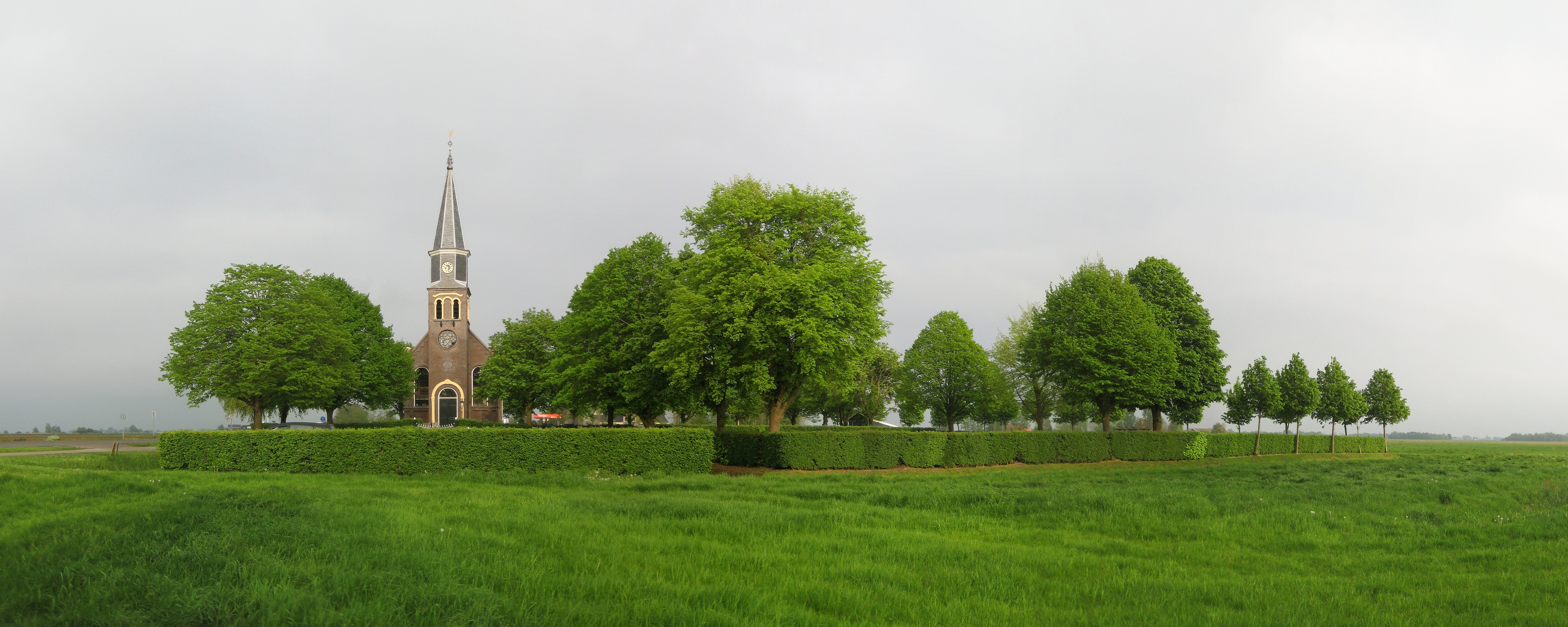
- The church and cemetery of Echten

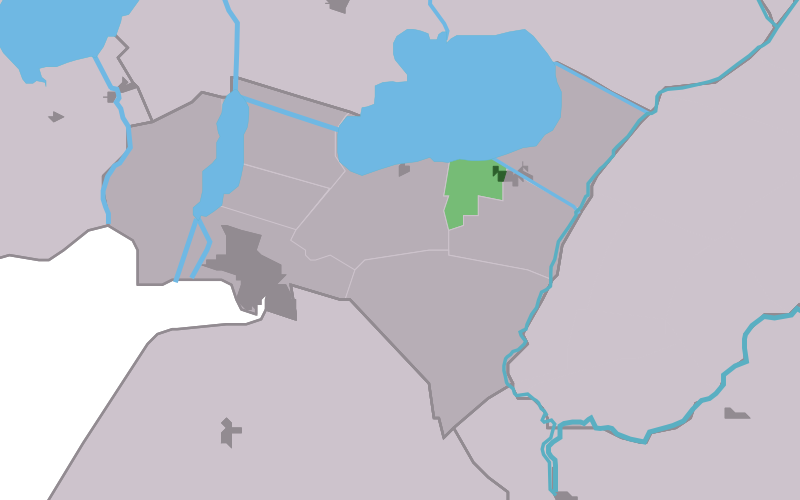
- Location in the former Lemsterlân municipality

- Location in the Netherlands Echten (Netherlands)
- Country: Netherlands
- Province: Friesland
- Municipality: De Fryske Marren

Area
  - Total: 3.00 km^{2} (1.16 sq mi)
- Elevation: −0.5 m (−1.6 ft)

Population (2021)
  - Total: 260
  - Density: 87/km^{2} (220/sq mi)
- Time zone: UTC+1 (CET)
  - Summer (DST): UTC+2 (CEST)
- Postal code: 8537
- Dialing code: 0514

Echten (West Frisian: Ychten [ˈiχtn̩]) is a small village in De Fryske Marren in the province of Friesland, the Netherlands. It had a population of around 235 in 2017.

== History ==
The village was first mentioned in 1245 as Acthne. The etymology is unclear, however forest of oak trees fits the earliest forms. Echten is a road village along the Heerenveen-Lemmer main road. In the 18th century, peat excavation started and finished in the middle of the 19th century. The Protestant Church dates from the middle of the 13th century, and received its current form in the late 17th century. In 1825, the village was flooded and most of the houses were either destroyed or severely damaged. In 1840, Echten was home to 894 people.

The 2,800 hectares (6,900 acres) Veenpolder was poldered between 1856 and 1871. It needed 7 wind mills to pump away the excess water. In 1913, a steam engine-powered pumping station was built. In 1925, it was converted to an electric engine, and the chimney was demolished. The pumping station was decommissioned in 1996. In 2006-2007, it was restored and the chimney was rebuilt. It is currently used an exhibition and gallery space.

== Gallery ==
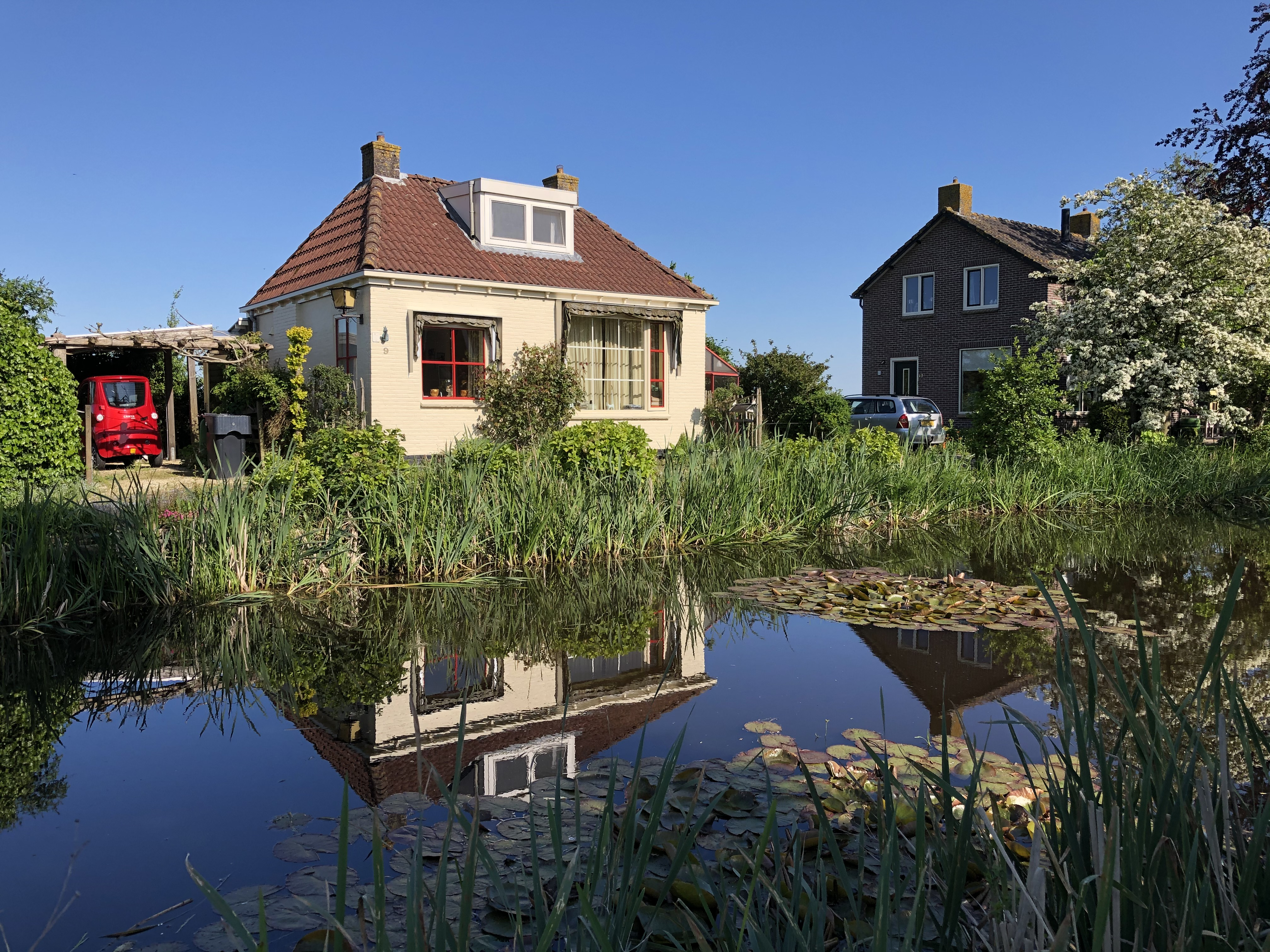
House along the canal

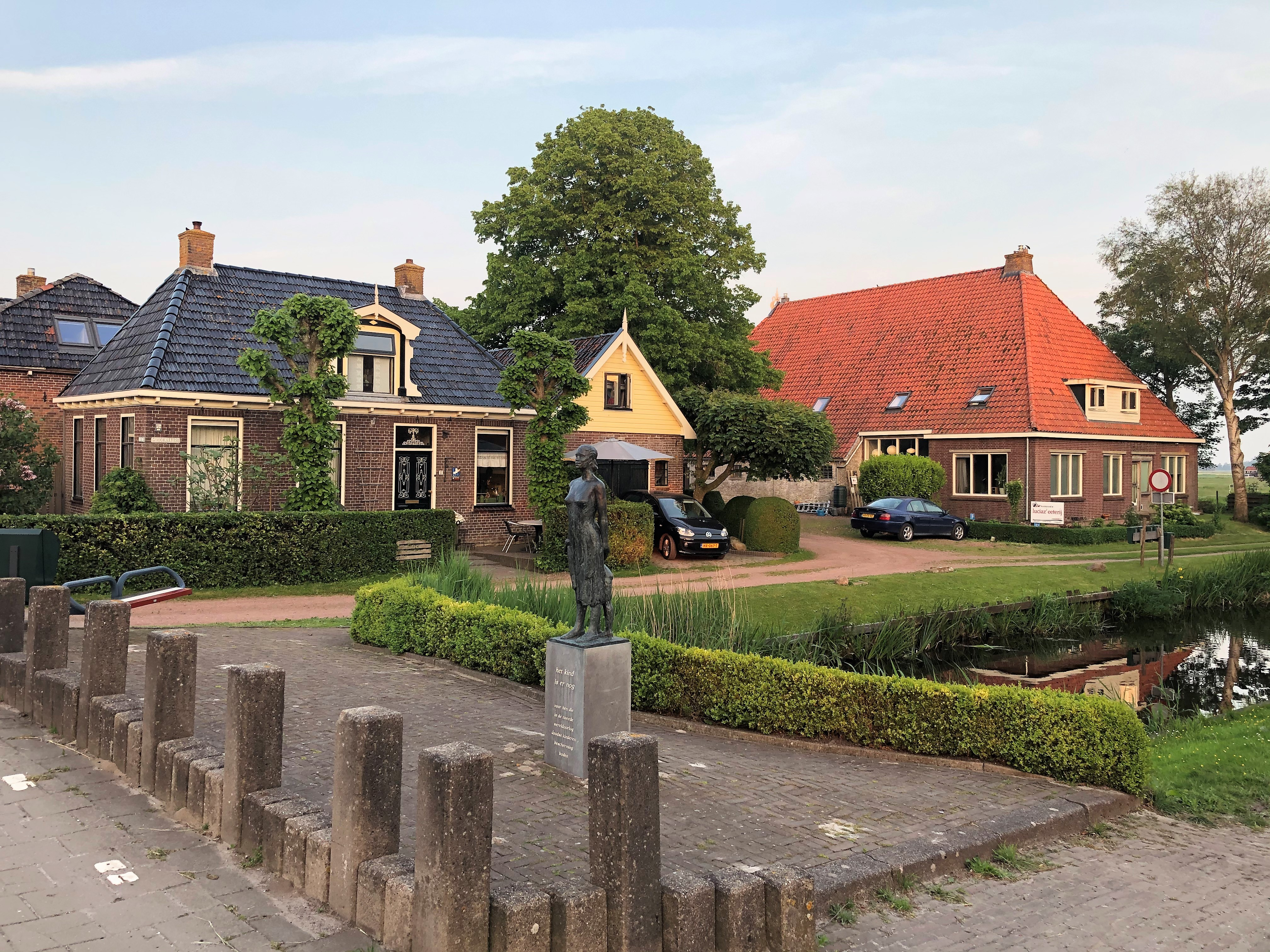
Village centre

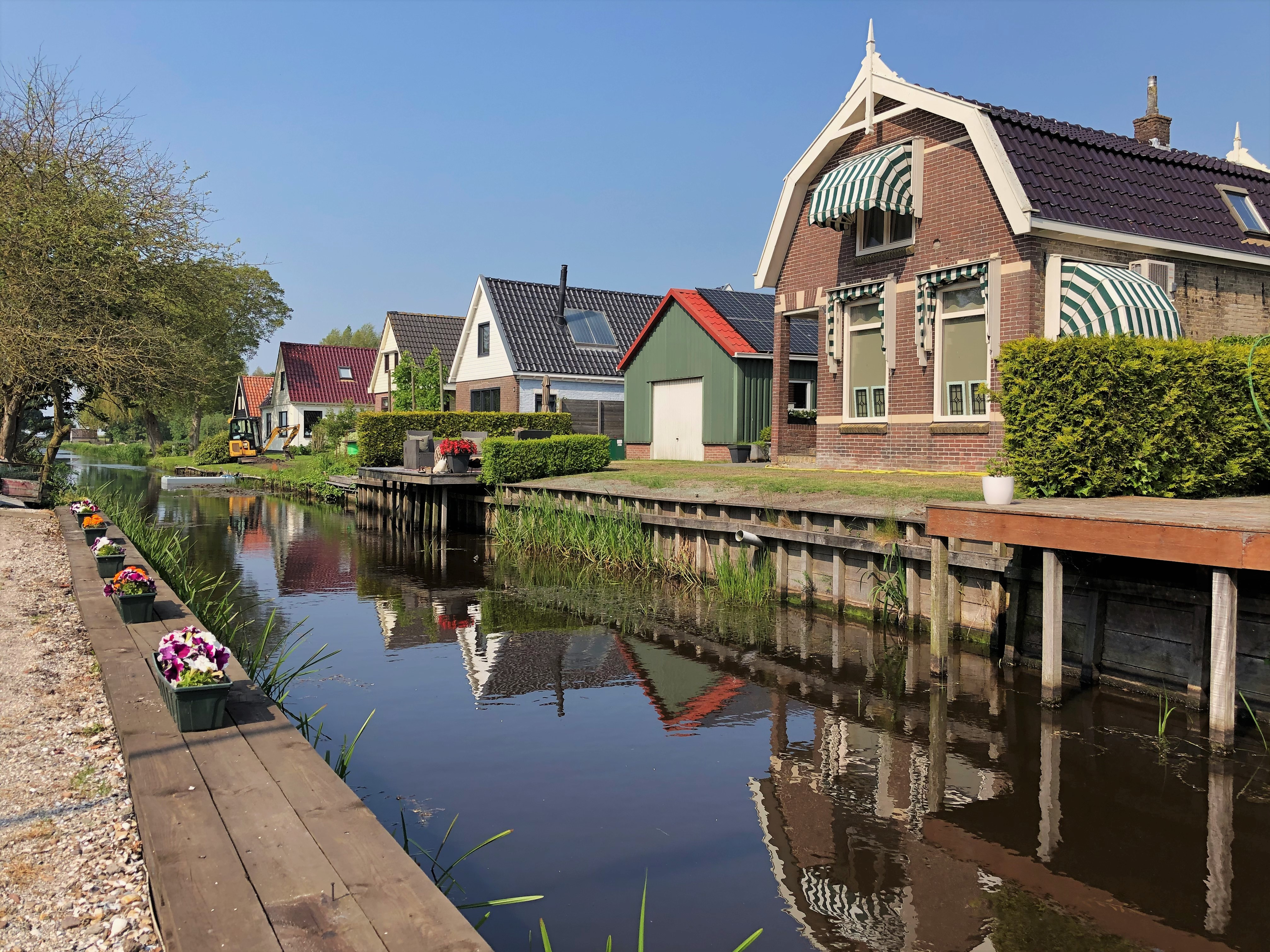
Houses along the canal

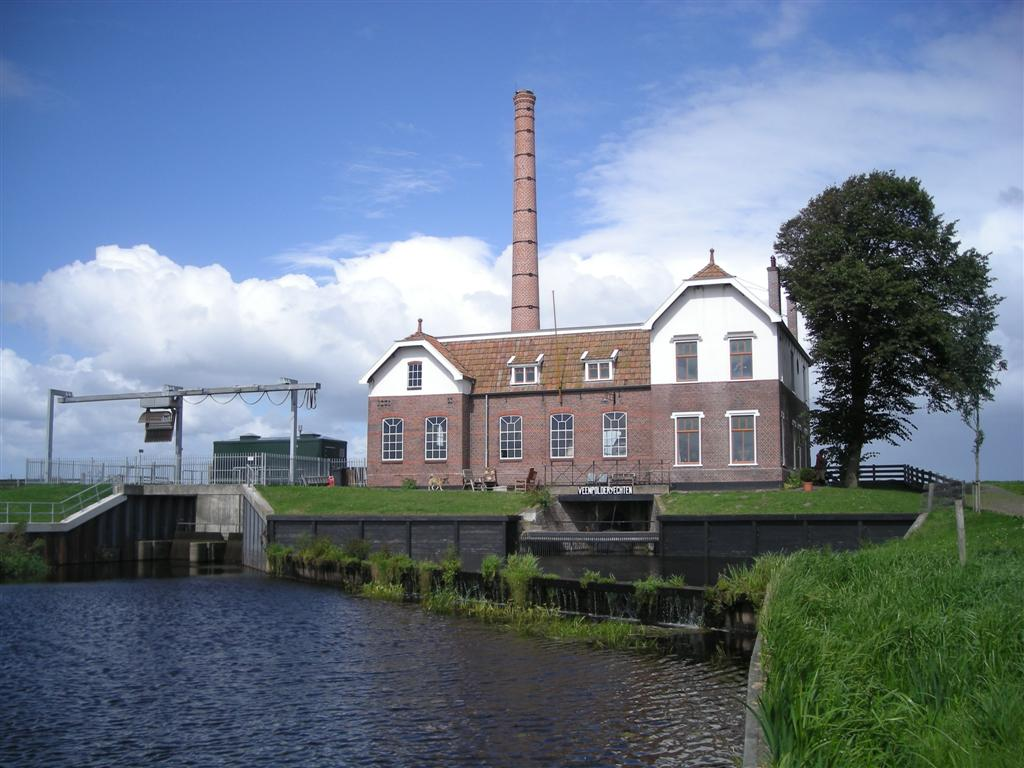
Pumping station Echten
