= Calenberg =

Hill in Lower Saxony, Germany

Coordinates: 52°11′54.24″N 9°47′42″E

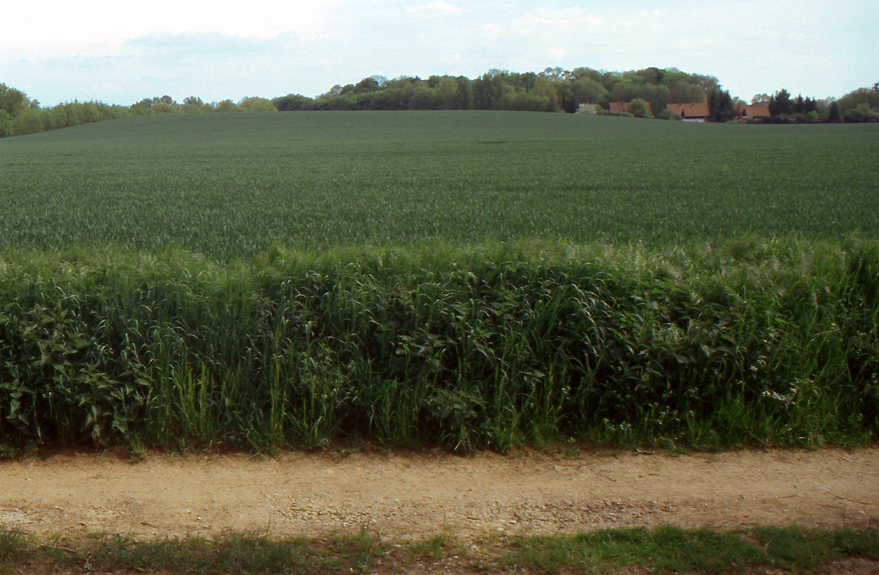
The Calenberg. In the background is the village of Alt Calenberg with former workers' houses and the overgrown ramparts of the old castle of Calenberg

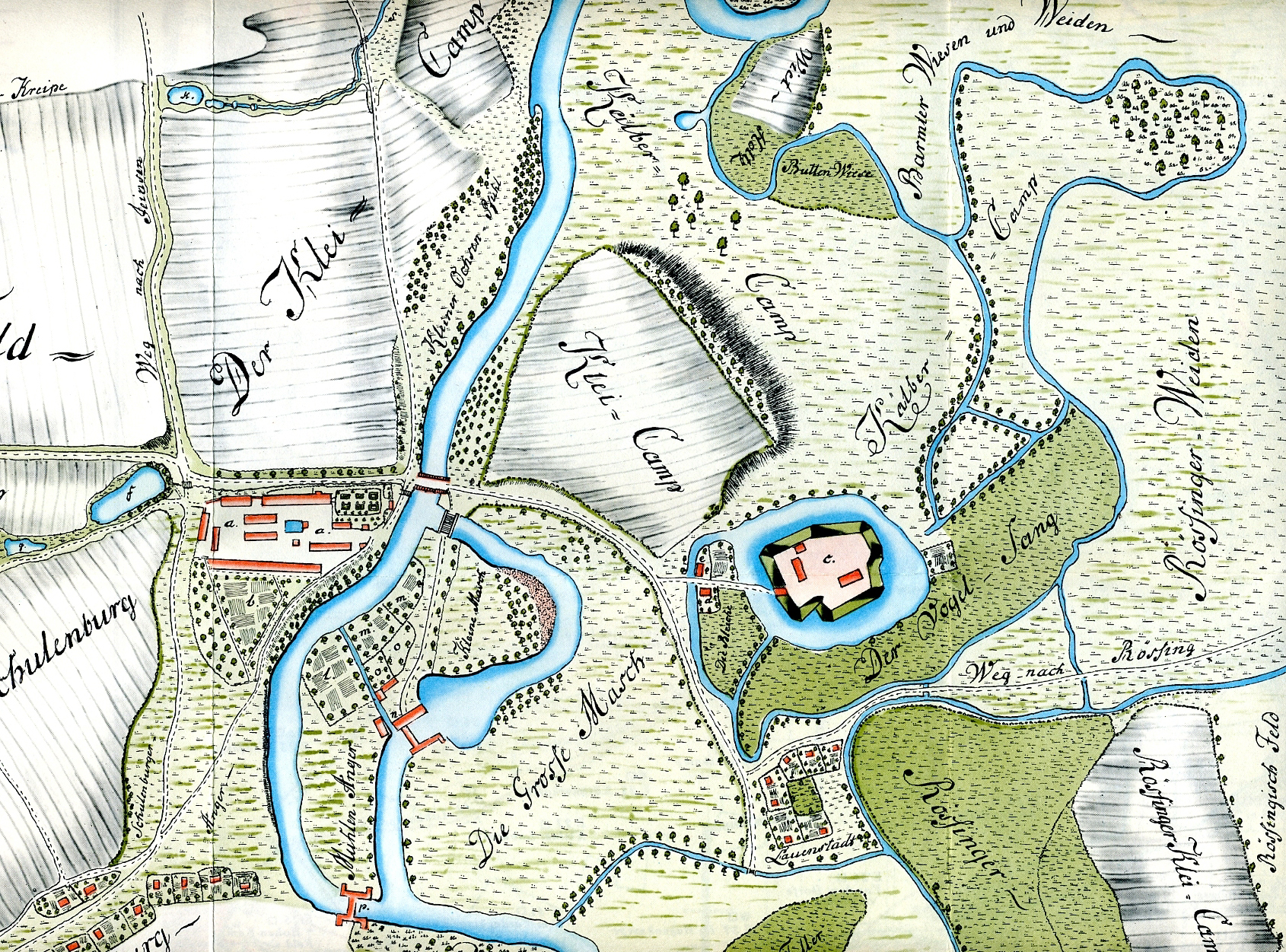
The Calenberg in 1771. The map is not north-oriented. Key to the original: a. The Amt of Hof zu Calenberg; b. Kitchen and arboretum; c. Old castle of Calenberg; d. Licent–Bedienten accommodation; e. Deputat–Bedienten accommodation; f. Oehlmühle millpond; g. Little Pond; k. Posen Pond; l. The hop garden; m. Deputat garden; n. The mill; o. Garden; p. Water overshoot; q. The wells by the ponds.

The Calenberg is a hill in central Germany in the Leine depression near Pattensen in the municipality of Schulenburg. It lies 13 km west of the city of Hildesheim in south Lower Saxony on the edge of the Central Uplands. It is made from a chalk marl slab (Kalkmergelbank), has a height of 70 m above NN and was formed almost 100 million years ago at the beginning of the Upper Cretaceous series in Cenomanian stage. The Calenberg became historically important as a result of the fort, stronghold and castle built as the main residence of the House of Hanover.

== Etymology ==
The syllables Kal, Kalen-, Calen- in the word Calenberg are derived from the word kal in the Middle High German and Middle Low German languages and mean kahl i.e. "bare", "stripped", "unwooded". Name formations using Kal, Kalen or Calen could refer to its geological base (rock, stone). The syllable -berg goes back to the Old High German word berg, to the Middle High German berc(g), to the Middle Low German berch and the colloquial word barch. It can mean "mountain", "hill" or "knoll". So the word Calenberg means something like kahler Berg or "bare hill".

The syllable Klei in the word Klei-Kamp comes from the word klei in Old High German and Middle Low German and to the dialectic word klaibodden and means: heavy loam soil, heavy soil, thick clay. The syllable -Kamp goes back to the Old High German word champf as well as the Middle Low German and dialectic word kamp and means an "enclosed piece of land". From the middle of the 17th century onwards it was also used for large plots of private land even if they were unenclosed.

The syllable Kälber in the word Kälber-Kamp comes from the word kalver in Middle Low German and the colloquial word kälwer and means "calves". Fields known as Kälber were used to graze calves.

== Geography ==
The Calenberg lies in the protected landscape of the Calenberg Leine Valley (Calenberger Leinetal). It is bordered to the north by the Leine, to the west and south by the state road, Landesstraße 460, and to the east by gravel ponds. Its northern slopes are used for agriculture by the Calenberg Estate (Hausgut Calenberg) belonging to the House of Hanover, in the south are the ditches, ramparts and ruins of Calenburg Castle (Burg Calenberg) and several old workers' cottages belonging to the Calenberg Estate. The area of Calenberg Castle and the northern workers' cottages are protected as a monument and is referred to on maps as Old Calenberg (Alt Calenberg). In 2008 Hanover Region surveyed Alt Calenberg and its trees, each tree was numbered and marked after the estate had felled trees here in 2007-08.

South of Alt Calenberg, on the state road, L 460, are the houses of Lauenstadt. This settlement was founded in 1327 as a town, but never developed into a town. In 1613 it was ranked last in the list of towns in the Principality of Calenberg. By about 1900 markets were held north of Lauenstadt at which everyday items were sold in open stalls.

== Geology ==
North of the moat of Calenberg Castle, in addition to the former workers' cottages, was an old quarry, which supplied stone for the foundation walls and fortifications of Calenberg Castle. The quarry exposed four metres of the Cenomanian rock of which the Calenberg is made. The strata consist of plate-like, gray-white limestone, the upper layers being quite rich in fossils. Otto Seitz identified several varieties of ammonite (Mantelliceras Mantelli Sow., Turrilites costatus, Lam., Schloenbachia varians) and inoceramid (Inoceramus Cripsi Ment., Inoceramus tenuis Ment.) here. The quarry was used in the second half of the twentieth century as a landfill site and then covered with topsoil.

== Archaeology ==
There are at least two tumuli dating to the Bronze Age on the Calenberg. In 1840 two skulls were handed into the Hanover Provincial Museum (now Lower Saxony State Museum in Hanover), which had been discovered in a tumulus "near the ruins of Calenberg"; the exact location of the tumulus was not given.

== History ==
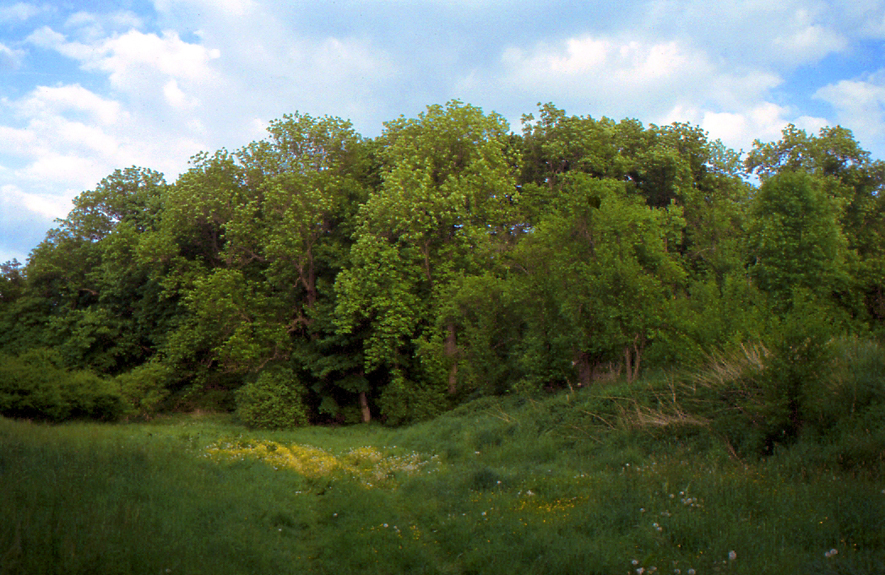
Dried-up moat and tree-covered ramparts of the old castle of Calenberg on the Calenberg

Calenberg Castle (Burg Calenberg) (later described as Schloss Calenberg and Feste Calenberg; ruins now called Alt Calenberg) was a medieval lowland castle (Niederungsburg). It was built in 1292 by the Welf duke, Otto the Strict in the Leine water meadows as a water castle on the southern part of the Calenberg.

Before the castle was built, the Calenberg hill rose some 10 metres above the water meadows between the river arms of the Leine that existed at that time It covered not just the site of Calenberg Castle, but extended a further 500 metres farther north to the River Leine. As a result the castle moats had to be cut over 10 metres deep into the layer of chalk marl. During high water the Calenberg still rises like an island in the surrounding floodwater.

The name Calenberg clearly indicates that the chalk marl stratum was not tree-covered, but stood proud of the Leine meadows as a "bare hill". The river terrace of the Leine had, in former times, laid down gravel to the north and south of the chalk marl step, that was later covered with loess and river loam (Auelehm). The builders of the water castle used this gravel, loess and loam to build the ramparts. At the start of the 16th century the water castle was converted into a manor house (Schloss) and then a fort (Feste). After the Thirty Years War Fort Calenberg lost its military significance and was slighted. Today it is a ruin with underground vaults, surrounded by high ramparts.

== Quarry, firing range and tip ==
East of the former labourer's houses, above the moat, was once a large quarry which was established during the construction of Calenberg Castle in order to provide building material. The small bore shooting club, K.K.S.V Schulenburg/Calenberg, founded on 12 June 1928 built a firing range there in 1930 with a low-level target trap in a chalk pipe, and then a shooting lodge in 1932. Because the low-level trap was often under water, it was replaced in 1935/36 by a high-level trap.

On 26 April 1949 the British occupation forces blew up the range and all its facilities. The then municipality of Schulenburg/Leine continued to use the quarry as a rubbish tip and eventually covered it with earth. Today, arable land covers the tip. Apart from the castle ruins and several old worker's houses belonging to the Calenberg estate, the Calenberg is used for agricultural purposes.

The State Office for Mining, Energy and Geology (Landesamt für Bergbau, Energie und Geologie) manages the current landfill site under the name Nordrand Alt Calenberg and under location number 2530124004. According to the department, the tip has an area of 7,570 m^{2} and a volume of 21,990 m^{3} and is used for building rubble, spoil, household rubbish and bulk rubbish.

== Maps ==
- Geologische Karte von Preußen und benachbarten deutschen Ländern Lieferung 265: Blatt Elze Nr. 2089. Berlin 1927. Mit einem Begleitheft Erläuterungen zur Geologischen Karte von Preußen und benachbarten deutschen Ländern…Blatt Elze von Adolf Hoffmann, Berlin 1927.
- Flurnamenkarte 1:10.000 Blatt 5/3 Gestorf des Landkreises Hannover, Abt. Kartographie, o. J. (1986).
- Flurnamenlexikon zur Flurnamenkarte, Hrsg. vom Landkreis Hannover. Bearb. Heinz Weber Teil 5,3: Gestorf. Schriftenreihe: Flurnamensammlung des Landkreises Hannover. o. J. (1986).
- Flurnamenkarte 1:10.000 Blatt 6/3 Alt-Calenberg des Landkreises Hannover, Abt. Kartographie, o. J. (1981).
- Flurnamenlexikon zur Flurnamenkarte, Hrsg. vom Landkreis Hannover. Bearb. Heinz Weber Teil 6,3: Alt-Calenberg. Schriftenreihe: Flurnamensammlung des Landkreises Hannover. o. J. (1987).
