= Warten =

Wartena Warten
- Village
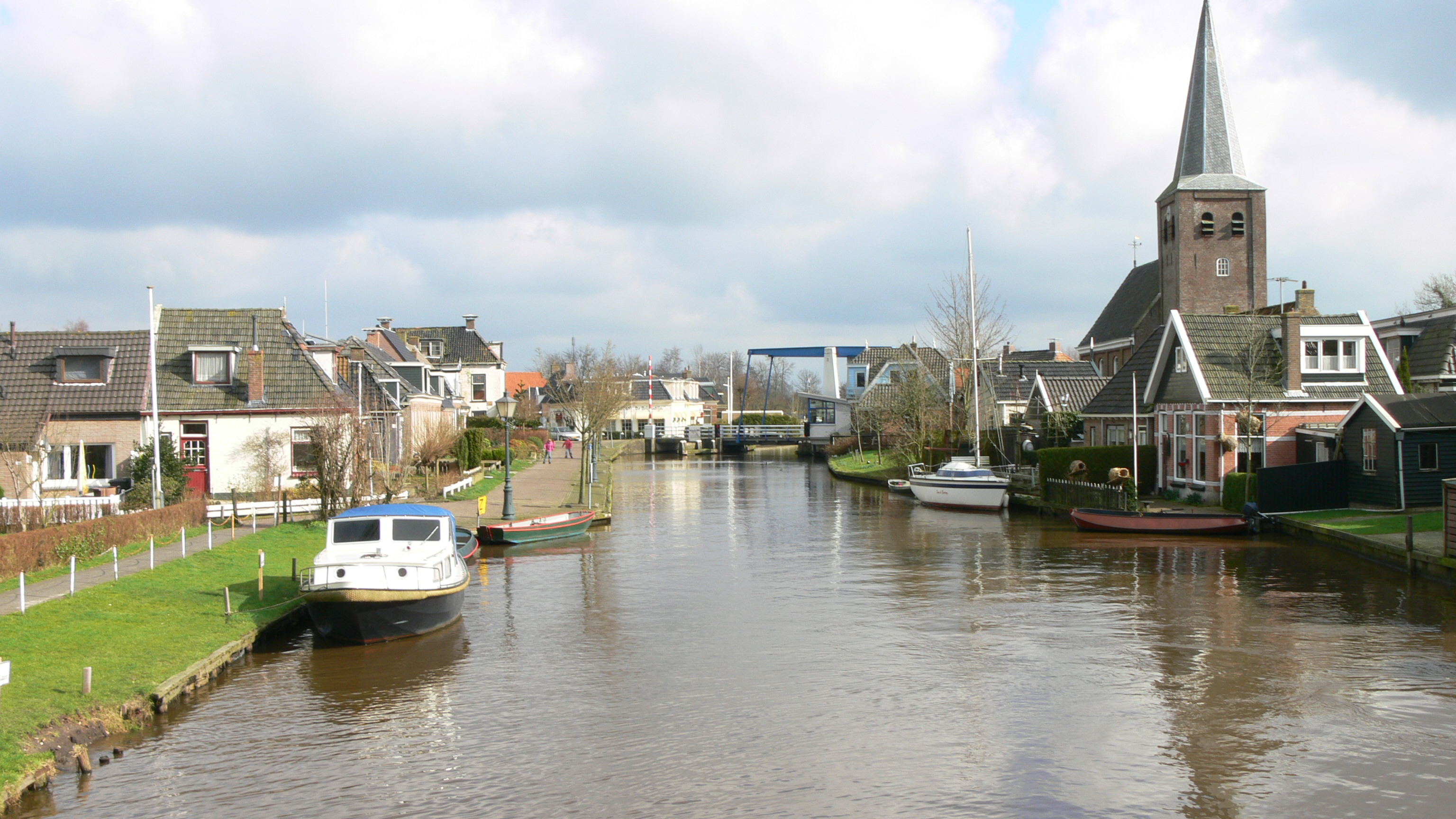

- Flag Coat of arms

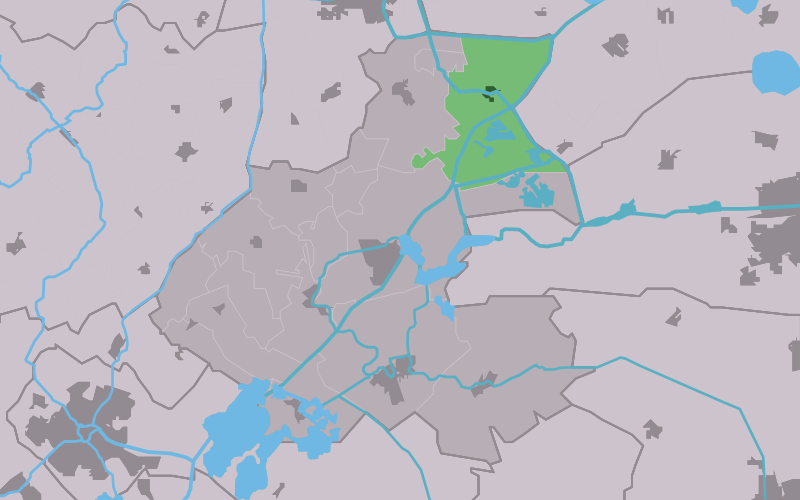
- Location in the former Boarnsterhim municipality

- Location in the Netherlands Wartena (Netherlands)
- Country: Netherlands
- Province: Friesland
- Municipality: Leeuwarden

Area
  - Total: 22.20 km^{2} (8.57 sq mi)
- Elevation: 0.0 m (0 ft)

Population (2021)
  - Total: 925
  - Density: 41.7/km^{2} (108/sq mi)
- Time zone: UTC+1 (CET)
  - Summer (DST): UTC+2 (CEST)
- Postal code: 9003
- Dialing code: 058

Warten (Dutch: Wartena) is a village located in the municipality of Leeuwarden, within the province of Friesland, Netherlands. As of January 2017, it had a population of approximately 915.

The village is home to a restored windmill named De Ikkers. Warten is situated near the De Alde Feanen National Park.

Warten is the hometown of Olympic gold medallist Marit Bouwmeester (2016: Laser Radial sailing).

== History ==
The village was first documented in 1412 under the name Wartena. Its etymology remains unknown. Warten was originally a terp (artificial living mound) village in the early middle ages. Later, it developed into a canal village. The Dutch Reformed church was built in 1780 as a replacement for the medieval church. The tower was restored in 1880. The Oud Friese Greidboerderij is an old Frisian longhouse farm constructed around 1728 on a terp. It is one of the few remaining farms which is still in original condition.

The polder mill De Ikkers dates from the 18th century. In 1921, it was purchased and moved to Snikzwaag to remove excess water from the Broeksterpolder. In 1970, it was purchased, relocated to Warten, and restored, though it is no longer in service.

In 1840, Warten was home to 461 people. Until 2014, Warten was part of the Boarnsterhim municipality and until 1984 it belonged to Idaarderadeel.

== Notable people ==
- Marit Bouwmeester (born 1988), sailor
- Rein Jonker (born 1950), speed skater

== Gallery ==
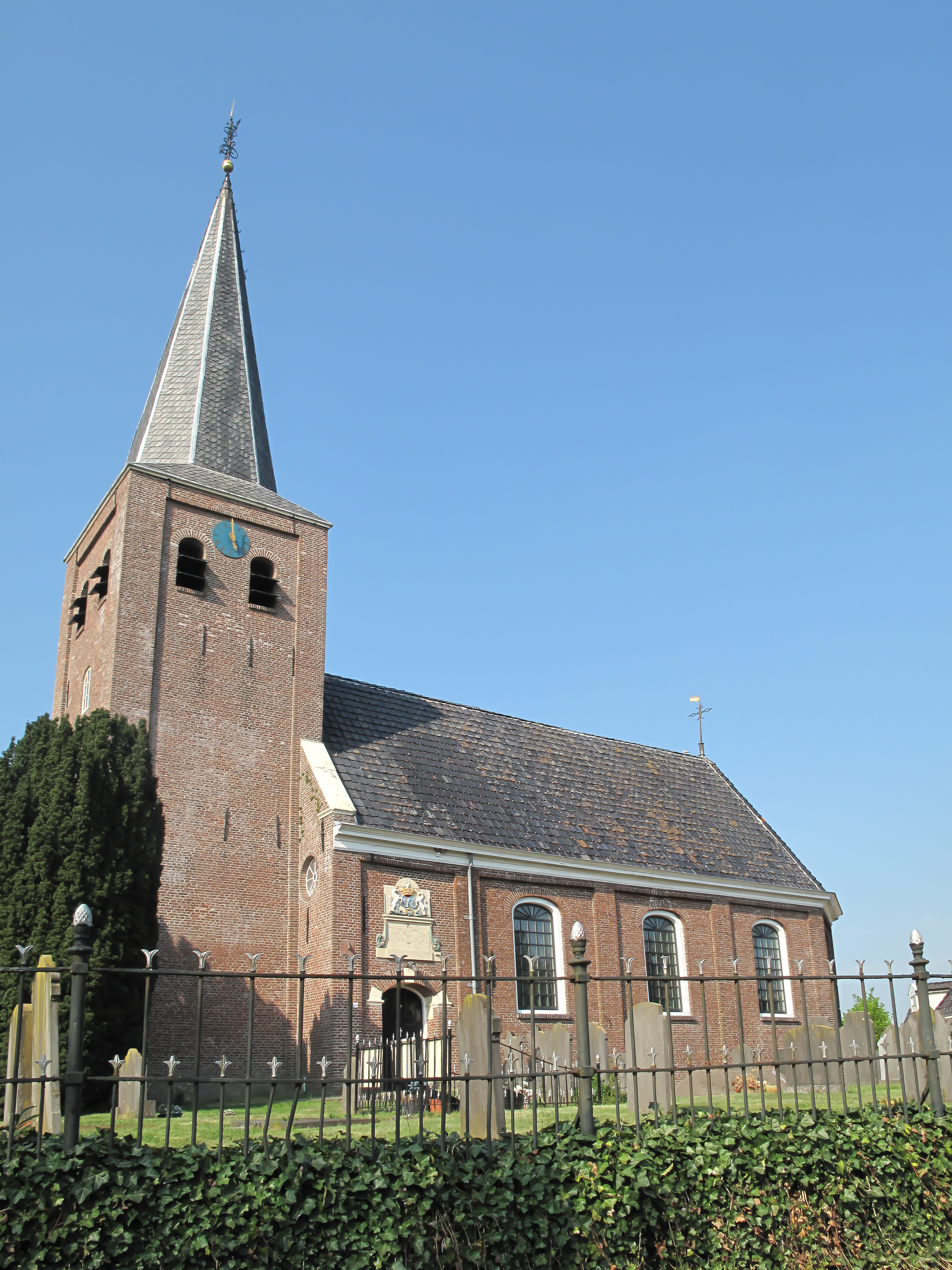
Warten church

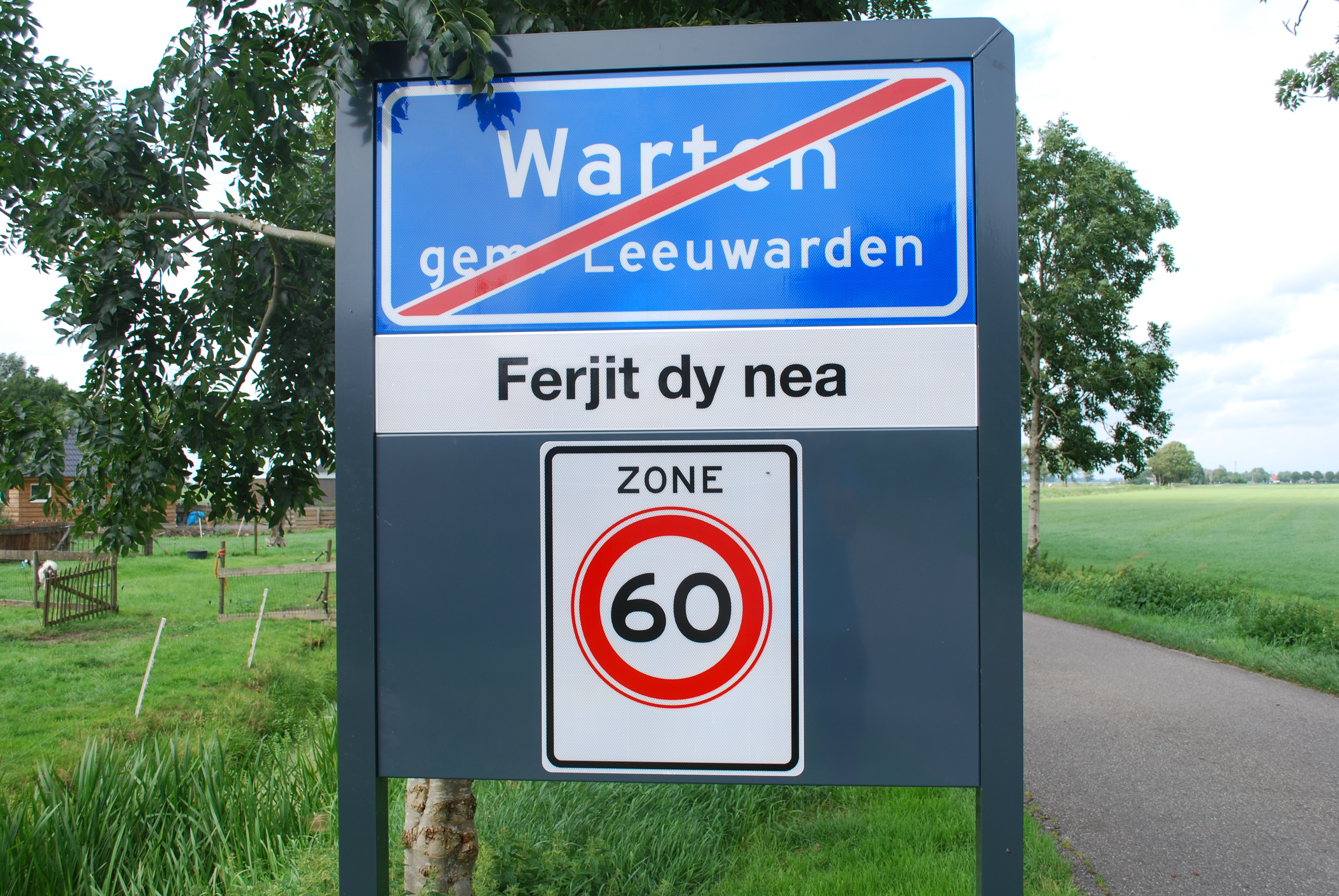

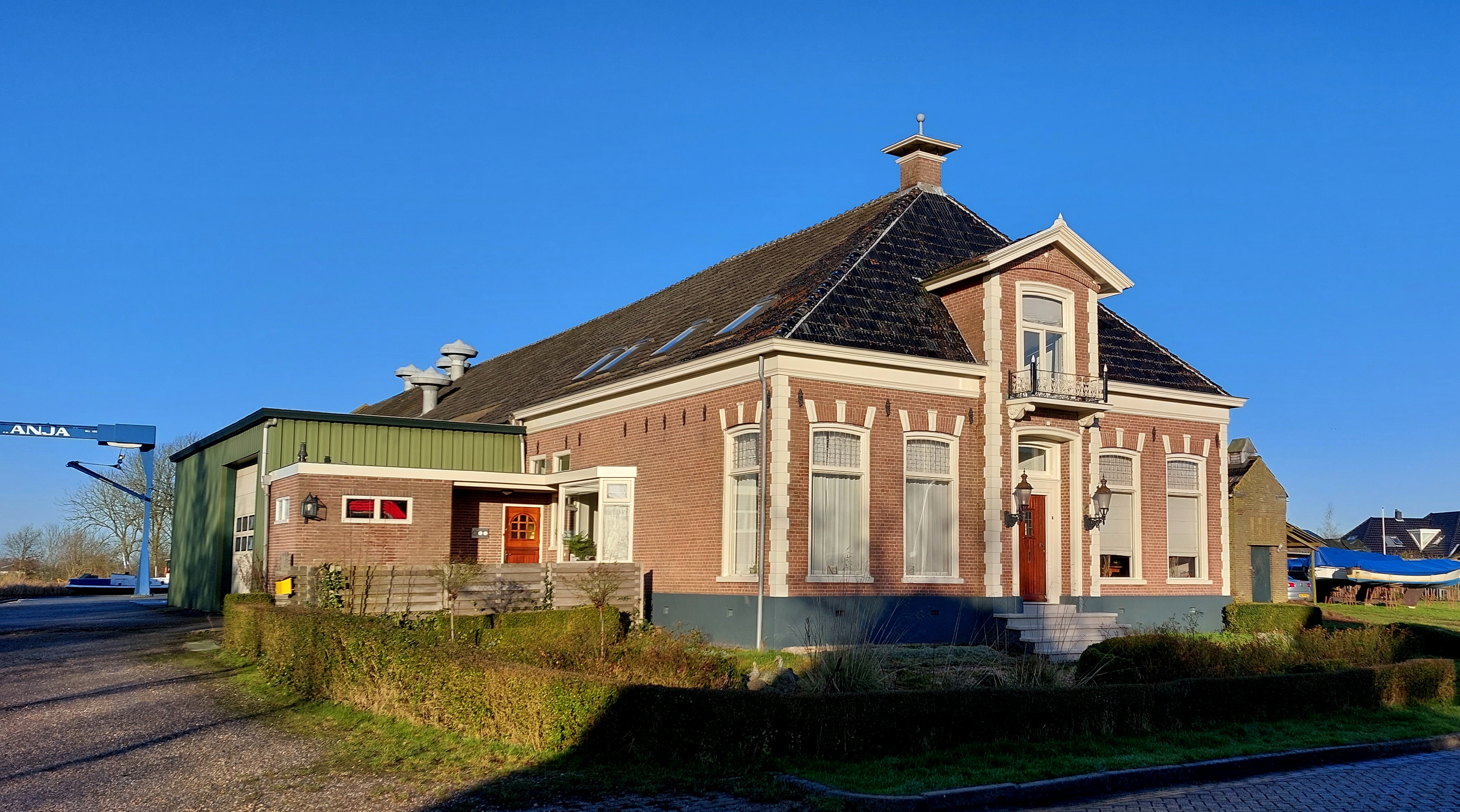
Farm in Warten. Former Director's house of the local dairy factory

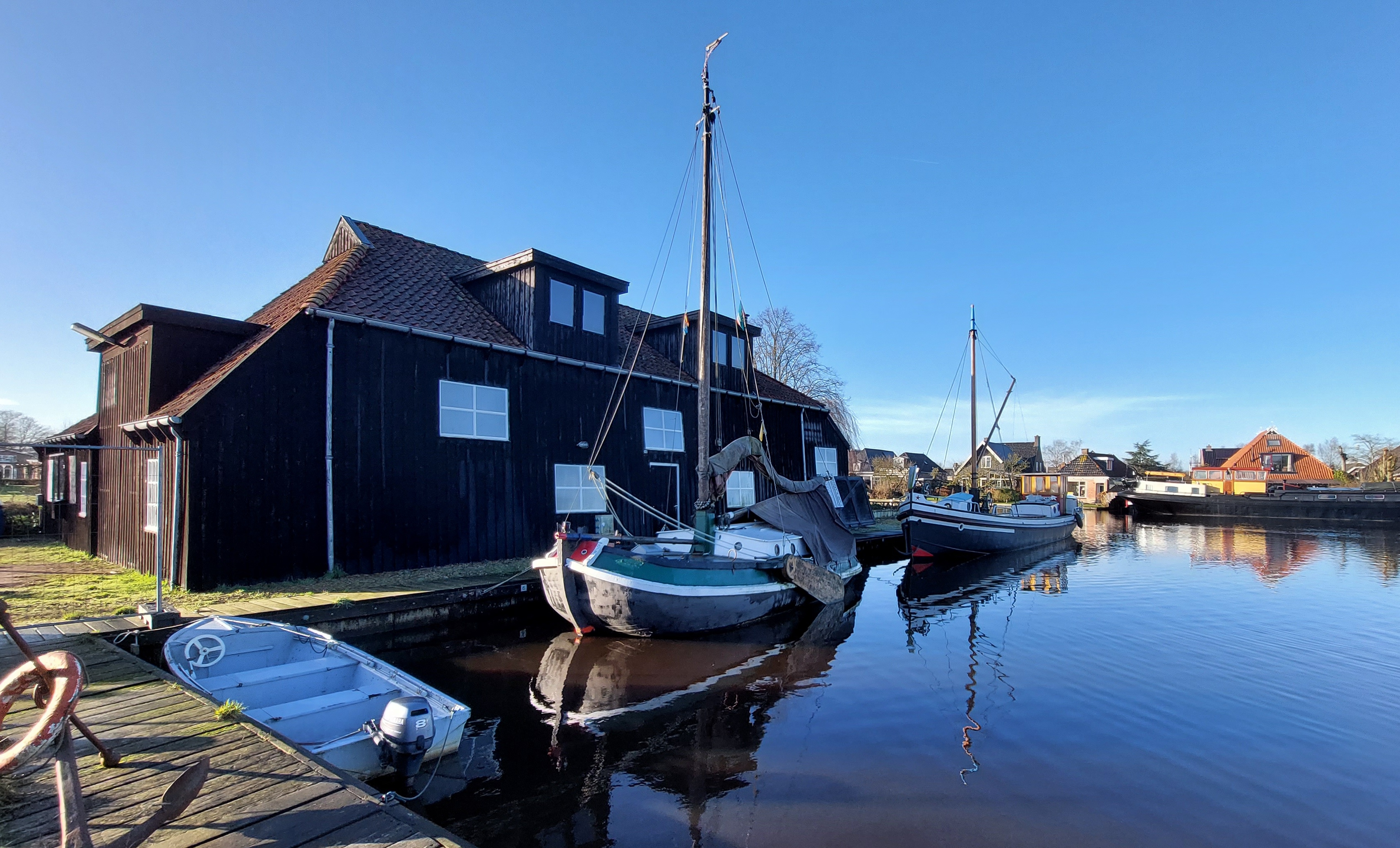
Harbour of Warten
