= De Ikkers =

Restored hollow post mill in the Netherlands

De Ikkers, Wartena
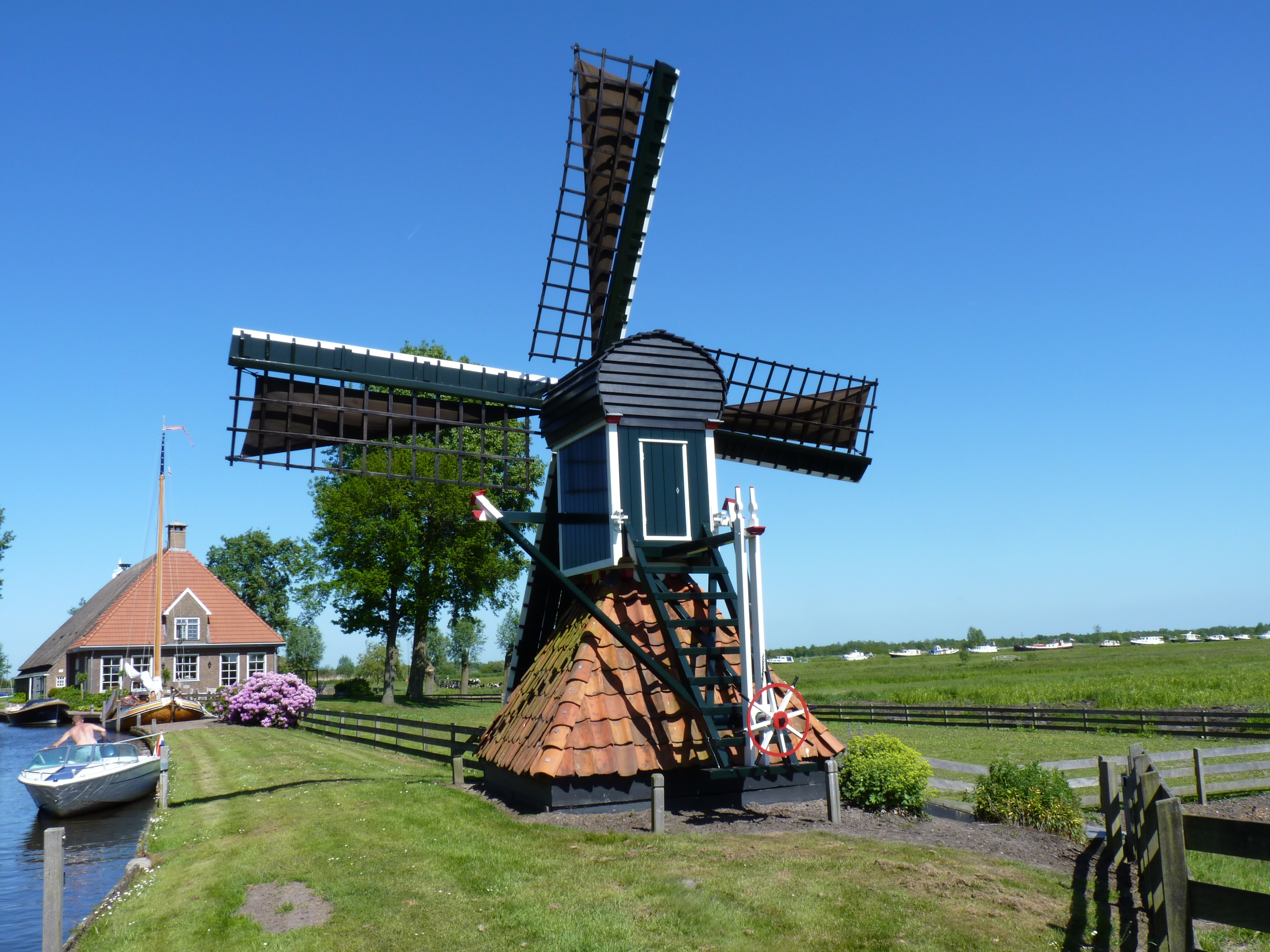
- De Ikkers, June 2010.
- Interactive map of De Ikkers, Wartena

Origin
- Mill name: De Ikkers
- Mill location: Aan de Saiter, 9003 XT, Wartena
- Coordinates: 53°08′17″N 5°54′40″E
- Operator: Stichting Langebrück
- Year built: 1970

Information
- Purpose: Drainage mill
- Type: Hollow post mill
- Roundhouse storeys: One storey roundhouse
- No. of sails: Four sails
- Type of sails: Common sails
- Windshaft: Wood
- Winding: Tailpole and winch
- Auxiliary power: Electric motor
- Type of pump: Archimedes' screw

De Akkers is a hollow post mill in Wartena, Friesland, Netherlands which was built in 1970 and has been restored so that it can turn in the wind. It is listed as a Rijksmonument.

== History ==
De Akkers was built in the 18th century. In 1921, it was moved to Snikzwaag, Friesland to replace a tjasker. In 1970, the derelict mill was bought by the Stichting Langebrück, Amsterdam, North Holland. It was moved to Wartena and restored. A similar mill, the Saitermolen, had previously stood on the site. The mill was restored in 1986 by millwright Westra of Franeker, Friesland. The mill is listed as a Rijksmonument, No.22934.

== Description ==
De Deels is what the Dutch describe as a Spinnekopmolen. It is a hollow post mill on a single storey roundhouse. The mill is winded by a winch. The sails are Common sails. They have a span of 9.70 metres (31 ft 10 in). The sails are carried on a wooden windshaft. The windshaft carries the brake wheel which has 27 cogs. This drives the wallower (15 cogs) at the top of the upright shaft. The Archimedes' screw is 70 centimetres (2 ft 4 in) diameter. It is worked by an electric motor. No other machinery remains.
