= De Princehofmolen, Earnewâld =

Windmill in Earnewâld, Friesland, Netherlands

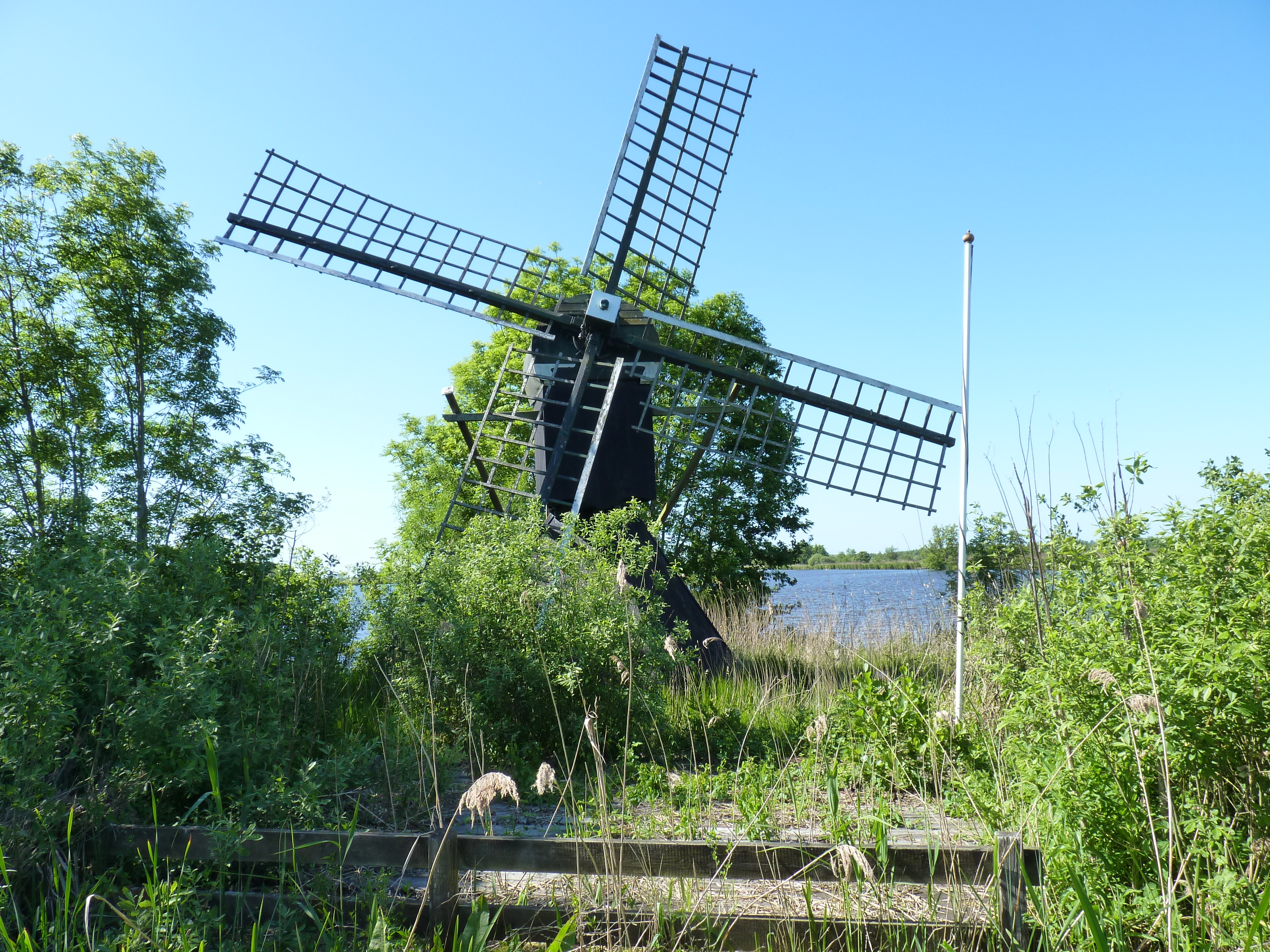
- De Princehofmolen, Earnewâld

Origin
- Mill name: De Princehofmolen
- Mill location: Bij Princehof 3, 9003 XA Earnewâld
- Coordinates: 53°07′20″N 5°54′39″E
- Operator(s): Private
- Year built: 1958

Information
- Purpose: Drainage mill
- Type: Hollow Post mill
- Roundhouse storeys: Single storey roundhouse
- No. of sails: Four sails
- Type of sails: Common sails
- Windshaft: Wood
- Winding: Tailpole and winch
- Type of pump: Archimedes' screw

De Princehofmolen is a hollow post mill in Earnewâld, Friesland, the Netherlands, which was built in 1958. The mill is listed as a Rijksmonument, number 22934.

== History ==
This mill originally stood at Fatum, Tzum. In 1958 it was sold by the Massold family of Leeuwarden to Mr Bakker for ƒ2,000. The mill was rebuilt by the Folkerssloot at Earnewâld by millwright De Roos of Leeuwarden at a cost of ƒ2,874.30. A grant of ƒ710 towards the cost was given by the province of Friesland. The mill is maintained as a landmark but is unable to work due to trees growing too close to the mill.

== Description ==
De Princehofmolen is what the Dutch describe as a "spinnenkopmolen" . It is a small hollow post mill on a single storey roundhouse. There is no stage, the sail reaching almost to the ground. The body of the mill is covered in vertical boards and the roof is covered in dakleer. The mill is winded by tailpole and winch. The sails are Common sails. They have a span of 10.20 metres (33 ft 6 in). The sails are carried on a wooden windshaft. The windshaft also carries the brake wheel which has 35 cogs. This drives the wallower (18 cogs) at the top of the upright shaft. At the bottom of the upright shaft, the crown wheel, which has 27 cogs formerly drove an Archimedes' screw, which was not fitted when the mill was re-erected.
