= Earnewâld =

Eernewoude Earnewâld
- Village
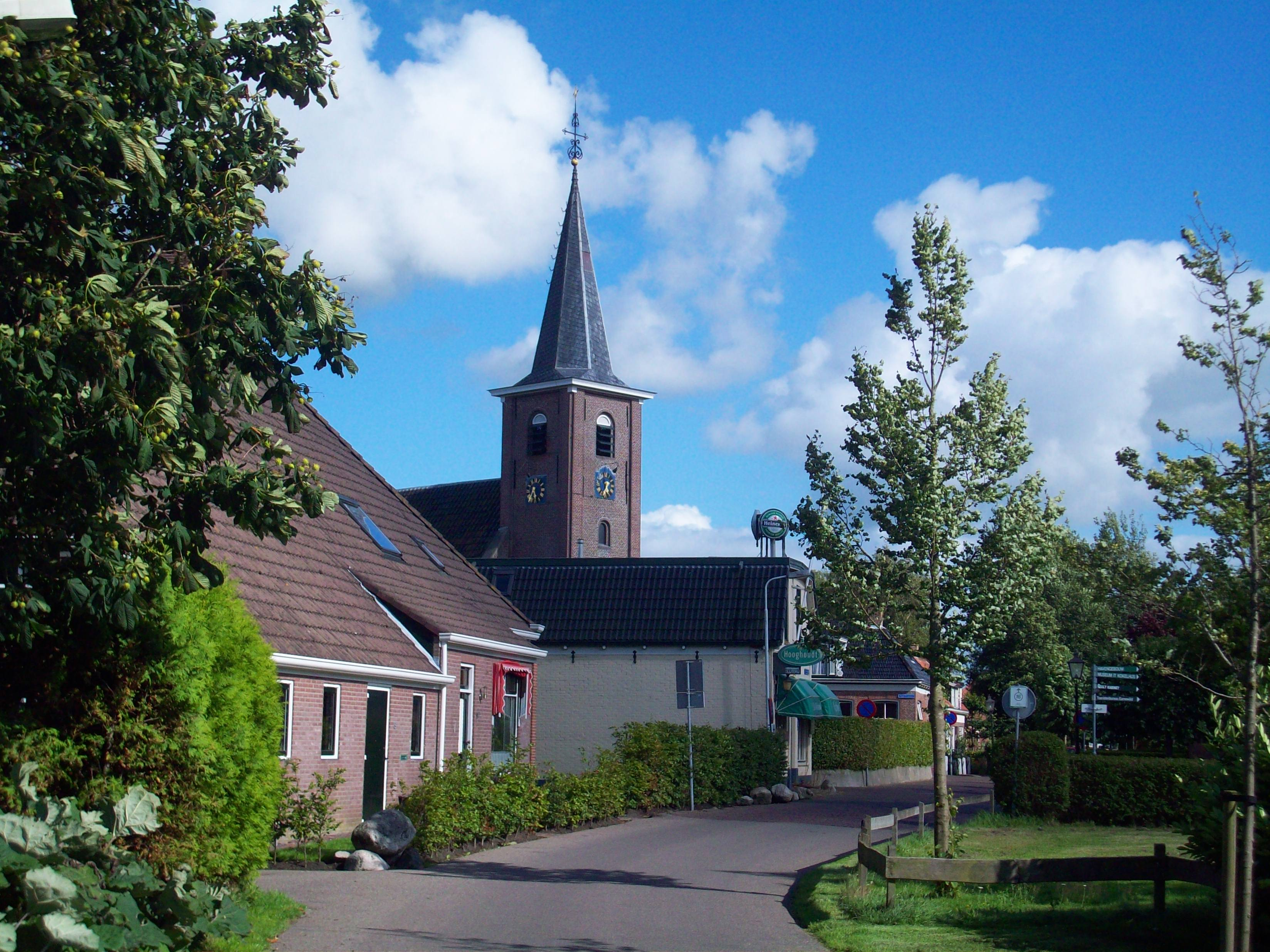
- Earnewâld Church

- Coat of arms

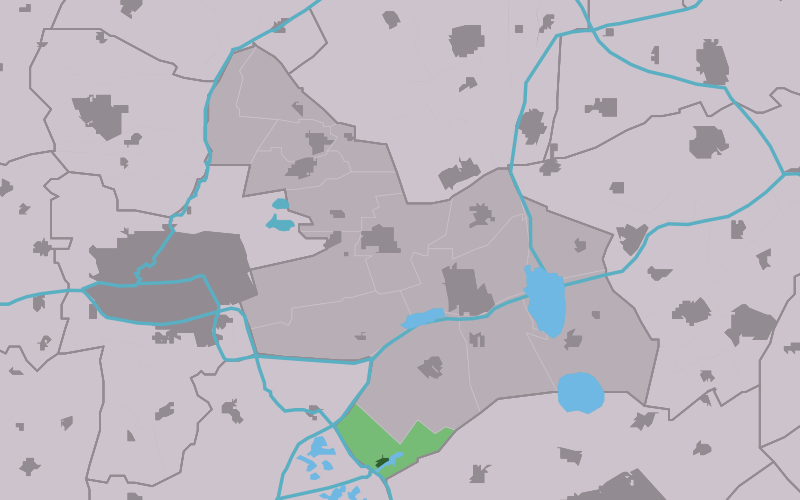
- Location of the village in Tytsjerksteradiel

- Location in the Netherlands Eernewoude (Netherlands)
- Country: Netherlands
- Province: Friesland
- Municipality: Tytsjerksteradiel

Area
  - Total: 7.46 km^{2} (2.88 sq mi)
- Elevation: −0.4 m (−1.3 ft)

Population (2021)
  - Total: 400
  - Density: 54/km^{2} (140/sq mi)
- Time zone: UTC+1 (CET)
  - Summer (DST): UTC+2 (CEST)
- Postal code: 9264
- Dialing code: 0511

Earnewâld (West Frisian pronunciation: [jɛnəˈvɔ:t]; Dutch: Eernewoude) is a village in Tytsjerksteradiel in the province of Friesland, the Netherlands. It had a population of around 409 in January 2017.

A windmill, De Princehofmolen, is maintained as a landscape feature.

== History ==
The village was first mentioned in 1471 as Eerndwaud. The etymology is unclear. It was sometimes called "Arendswoude" (forest of the eagle), however that is merely a corruption of the Frisian name. Earnewâld developed in the 18th century as a peat excavation village. The Dutch Reformed church was built in 1794.

Earnewâld was home to 310 people in 1840. The village was isolated until 1860 when a road to Garyp was constructed. It is home to a shipping wharf for historic ships. After World War II, it started to become a tourist water sports centre.

In 2017, an Avro Lancaster bomber was salvaged from the National Park, and is on display at the visitor centre of Earnewâld. The English bomber was attacked by a German fighter on the night of 4 to 5 September 1942 and crashed into the swamp. Three of the seven crew members died. Two are buried in Earnewâld. One body remains missing. The survivors were taken prisoner.

== Economy ==
Earnewald is known as a camping, fishing, bicycling and boating area and attracts a holiday crown in the summer months. It is a nesting site for storks. It is an access point to De Alde Feanen National Park.

== Gallery ==
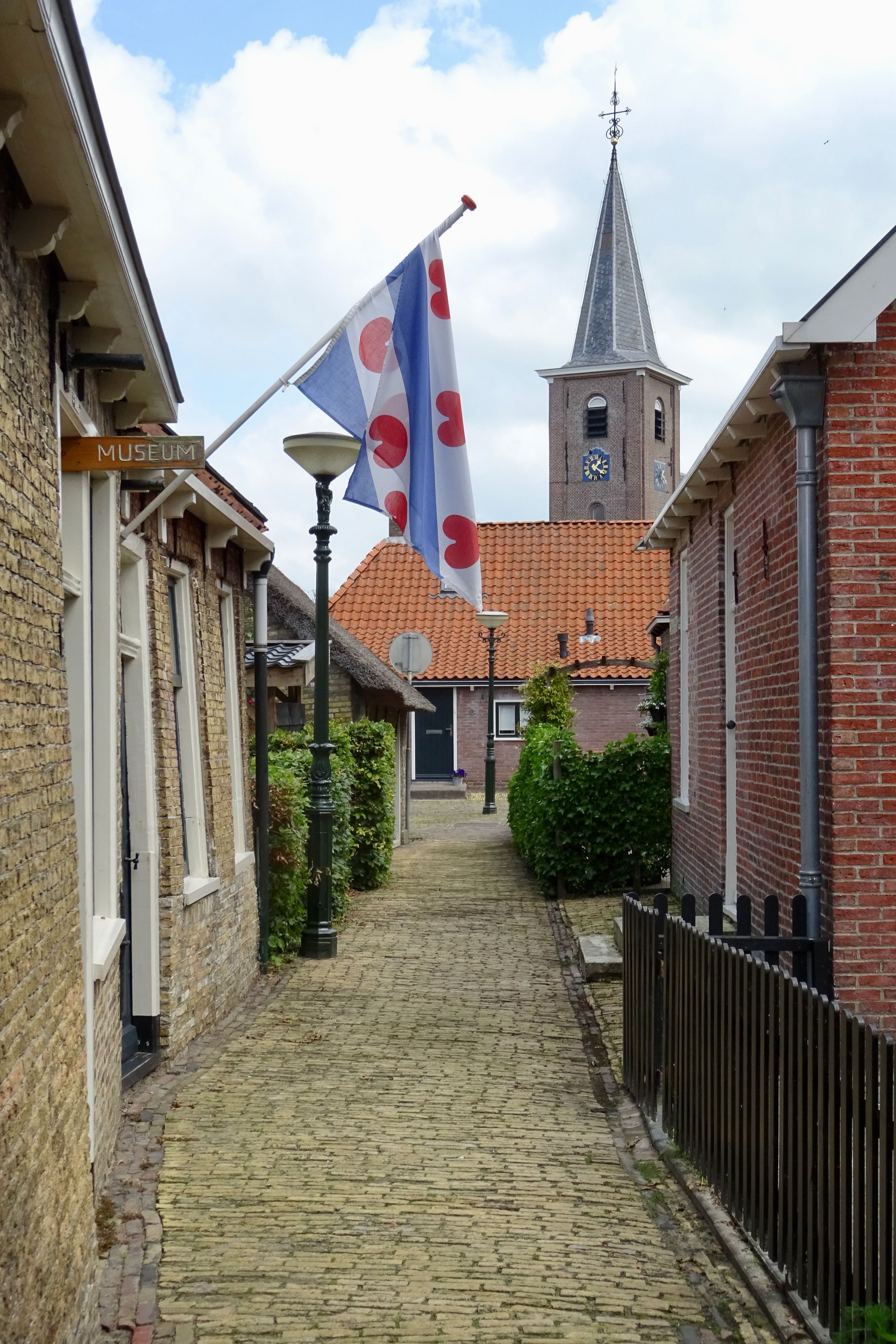
Village alley

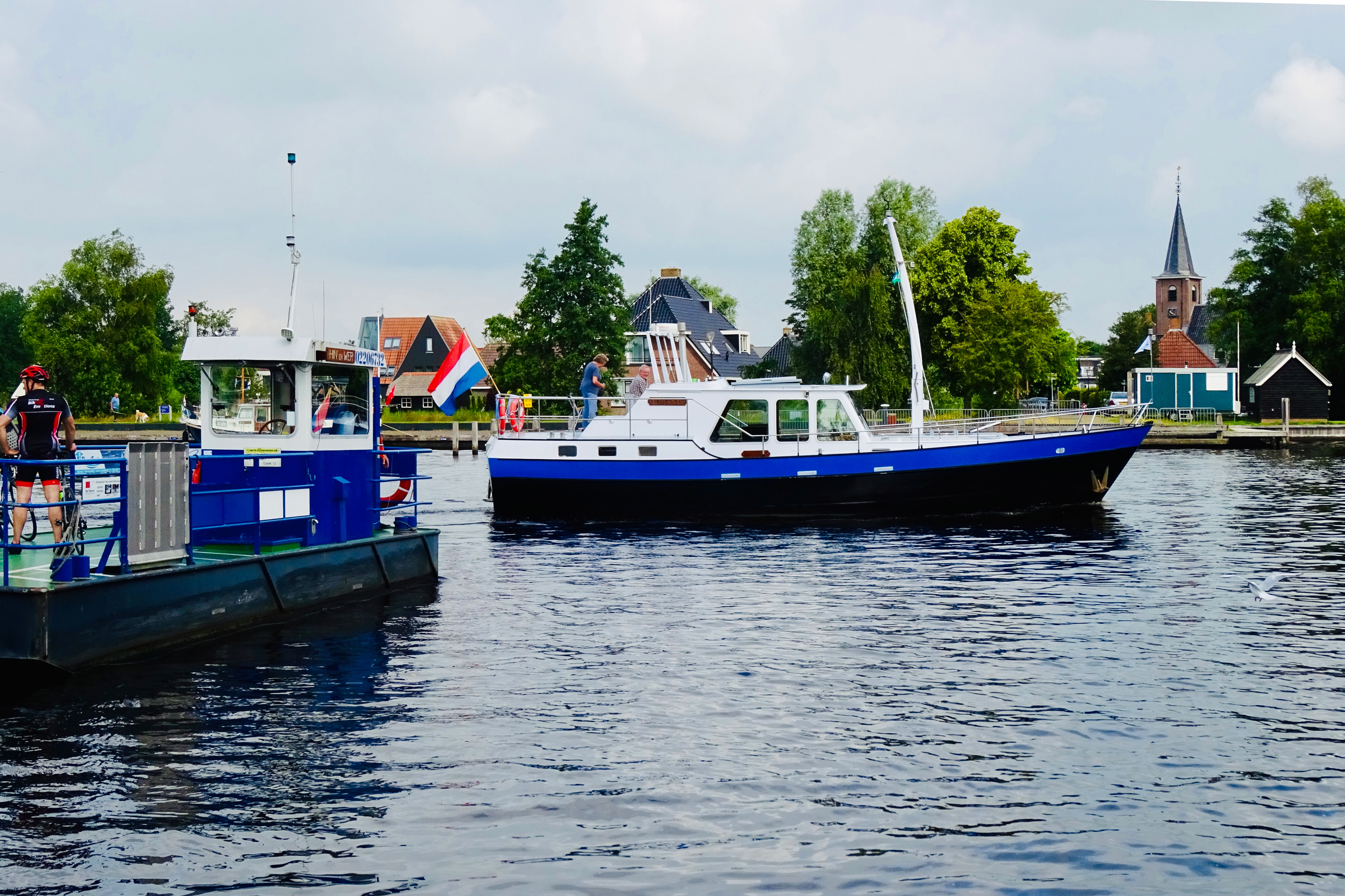
Earnewâld from the water

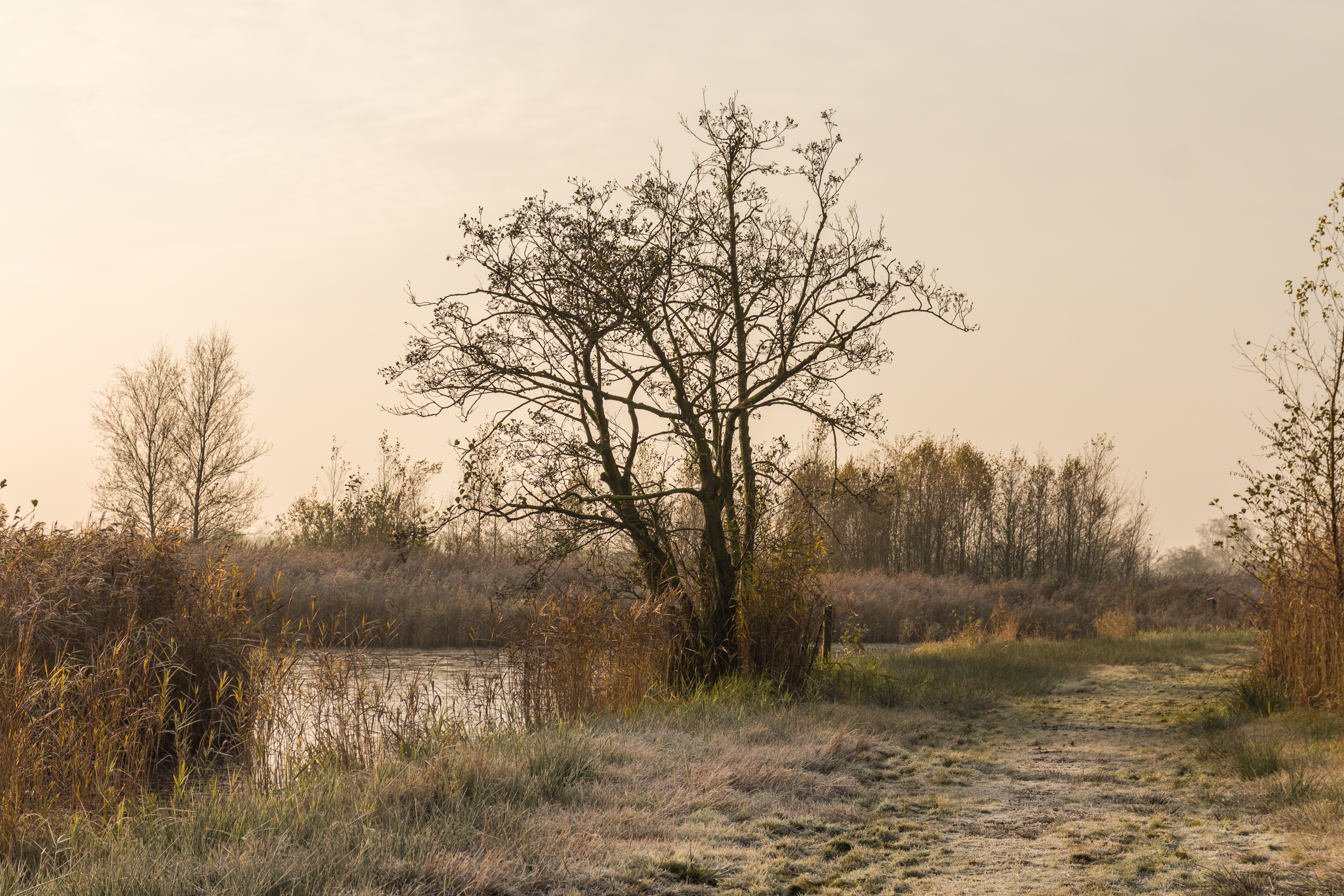
Landscape near Earnewald in winter

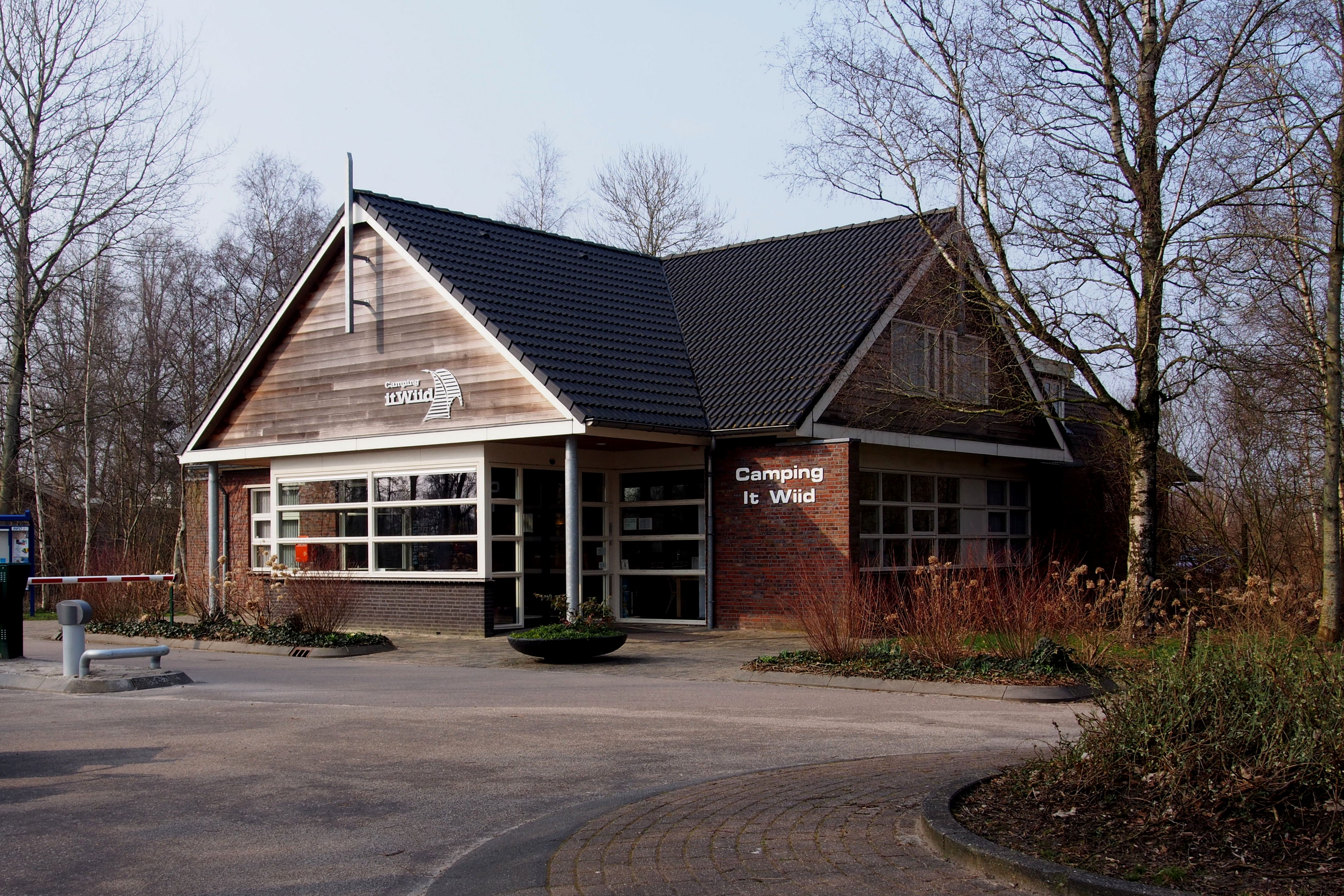
Camping
