= De Alde Feanen National Park =

Protected area in the Netherlands

- Nationaal Park De Alde Feanen
- IUCN category II (national park)
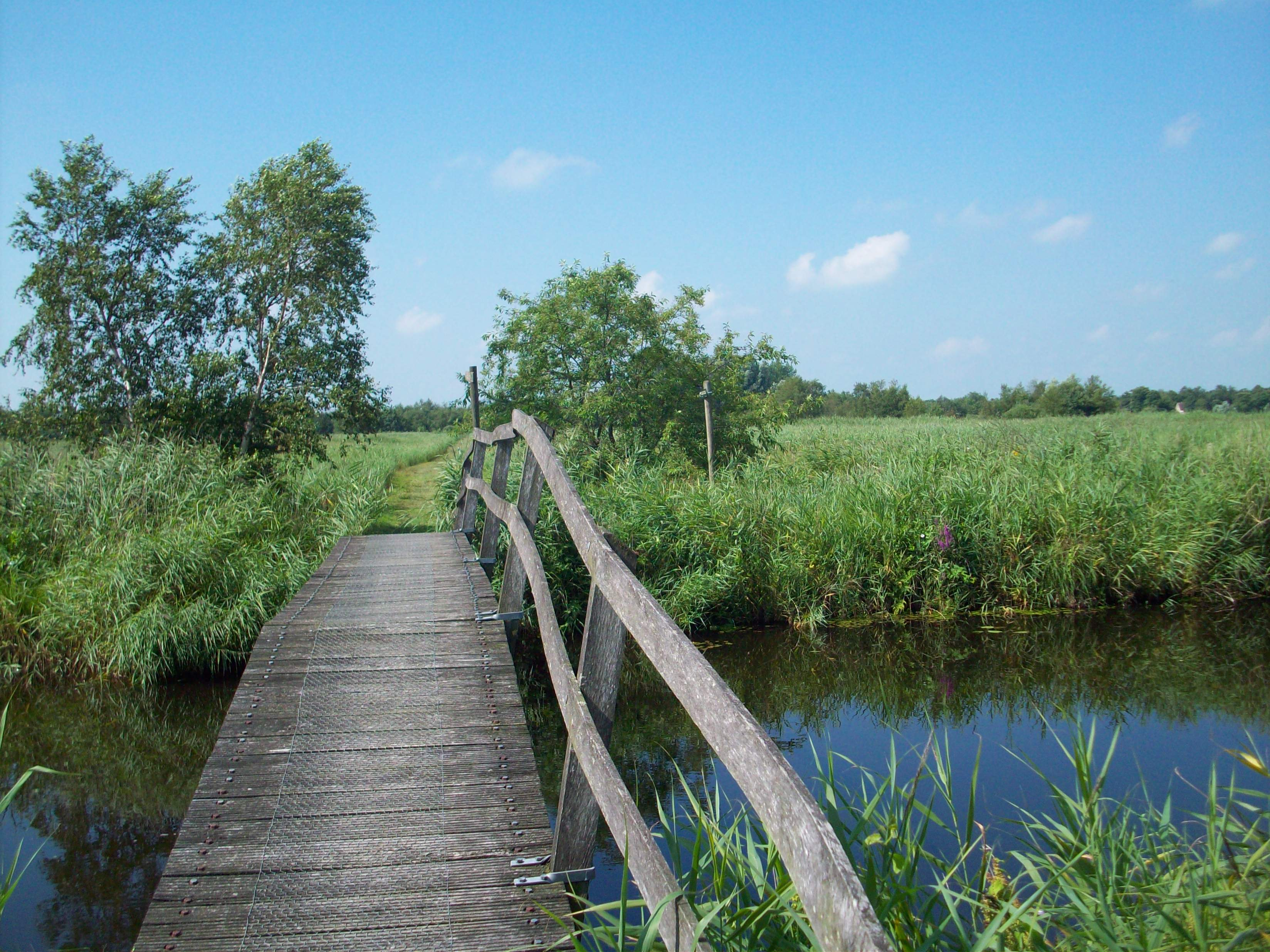

- Location within Netherlands
- Location: Friesland, Netherlands
- Nearest city: Earnewâld
- Coordinates: 53.1202°N 5.911°E
- Area: 25 km^{2} (9.7 mi^{2})
- Established: 2006
- Website: www.dealdefeanen.nl

Ramsar Wetland
- Official name: Alde Feanen
- Designated: 30 December 1992
- Reference no.: 578

De Alde Feanen National Park (official, combination of Dutch and Frisian: Nationaal Park De Alde Feanen) is a national park in the Netherlands province of Friesland. The Alde Feanen is also a Natura 2000 area.

The Alde Feanen is part of the municipalities Leeuwarden, Smallingerland and Tytsjerksteradiel. Its size is about 25 km^{2} (9.7 mi^{2}). Part of the national park is the lake area Princenhof (or Princehof). The Alde Feanen contains morasses, lakes, forests, peat and meadows. In the area at least 450 plant species and 100 bird species can be found. A very prominent bird is the white stork (Ciconia ciconia). Tall wooden poles have been installed so that the storks can build nests. Another attraction is provided by Shetland ponies. Some of the paddocks can be entered so that ponies can be petted by visitors.

In the village of Earnewâld there is a visitors centre, De Reidplûm, close to the stork breeding station It Eibertshiem.

The area is owned by It Fryske Gea since 1934. After a preparation period of 4 years, the Minister of Nature designed it as the 20th (As of 2012, the last) national park in the Netherlands in 2006.

In the Alde Feanen are several monumental wind mills, such as 'De Ikkers', a so-called 'spinnenkopmolen' from the 18th century.

== Pictures ==
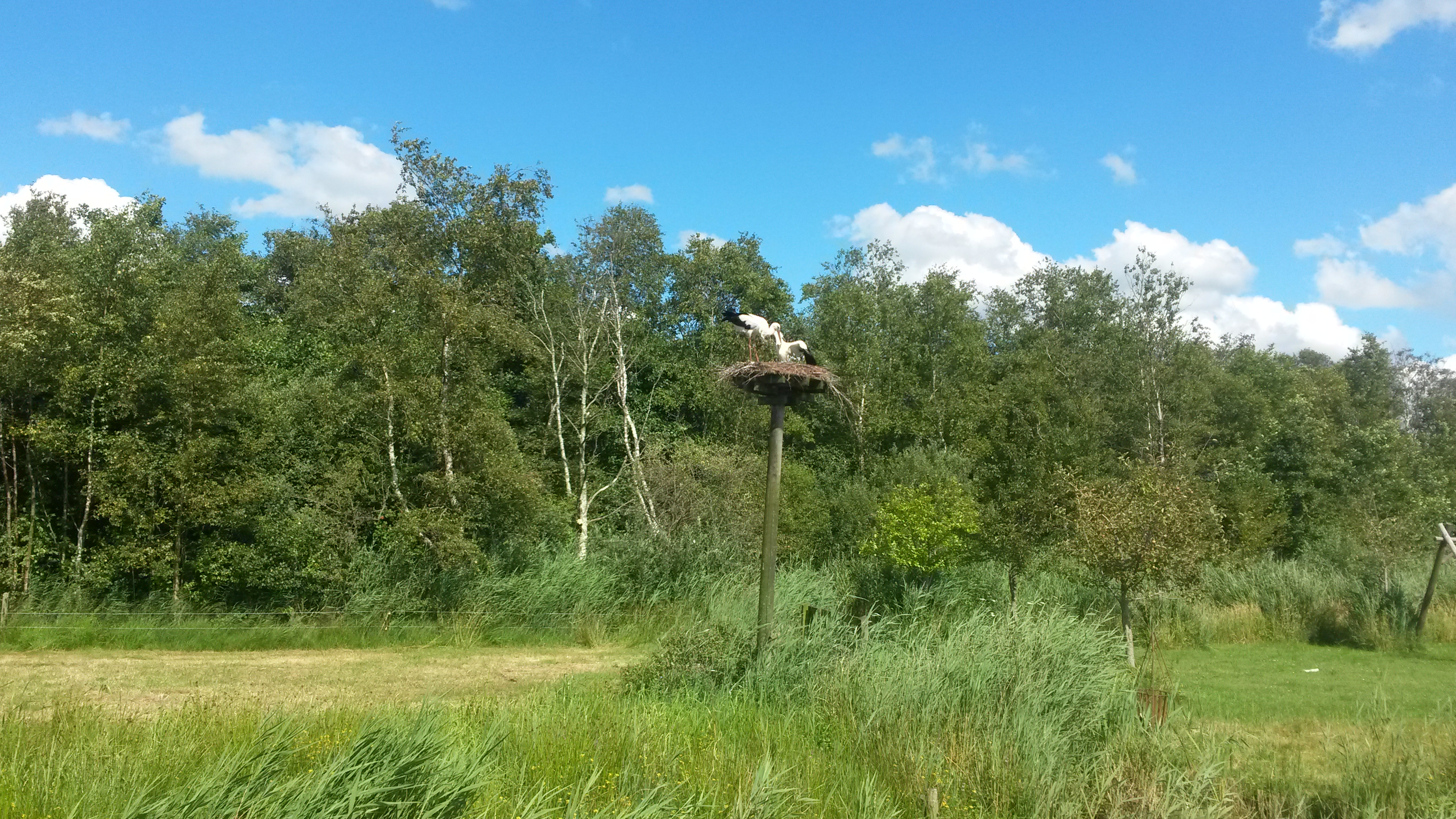
Two white storks on their nest

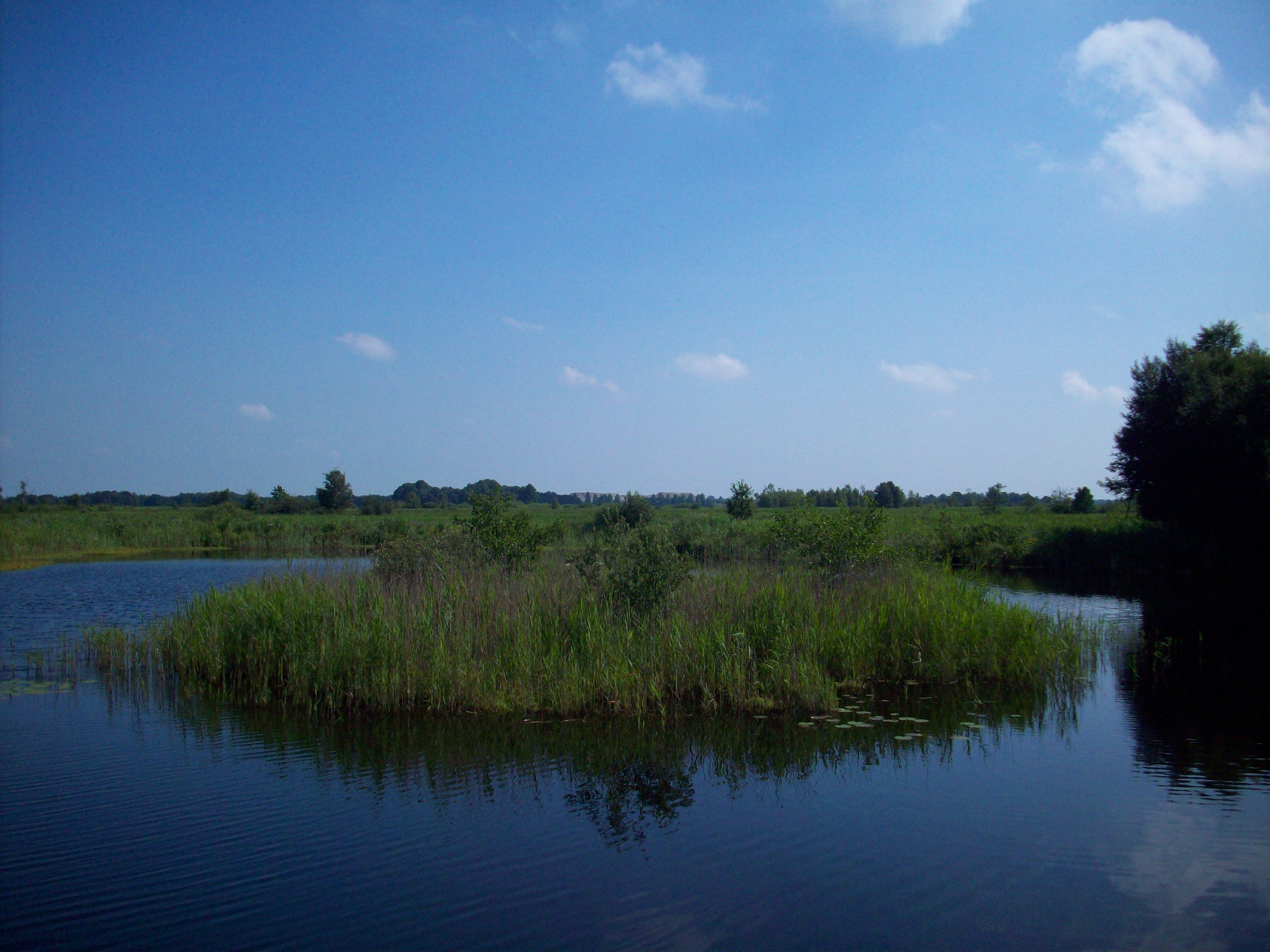

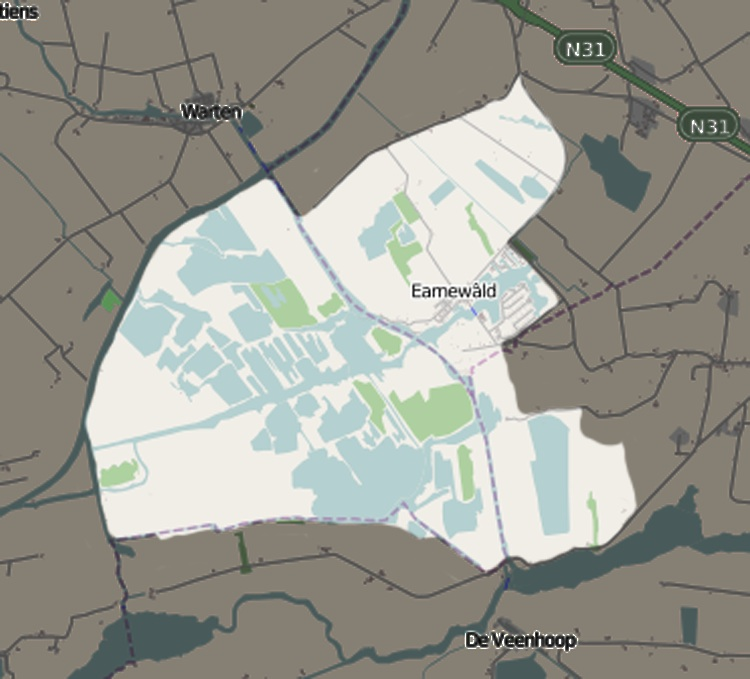
Map of Alde Feanen National Park

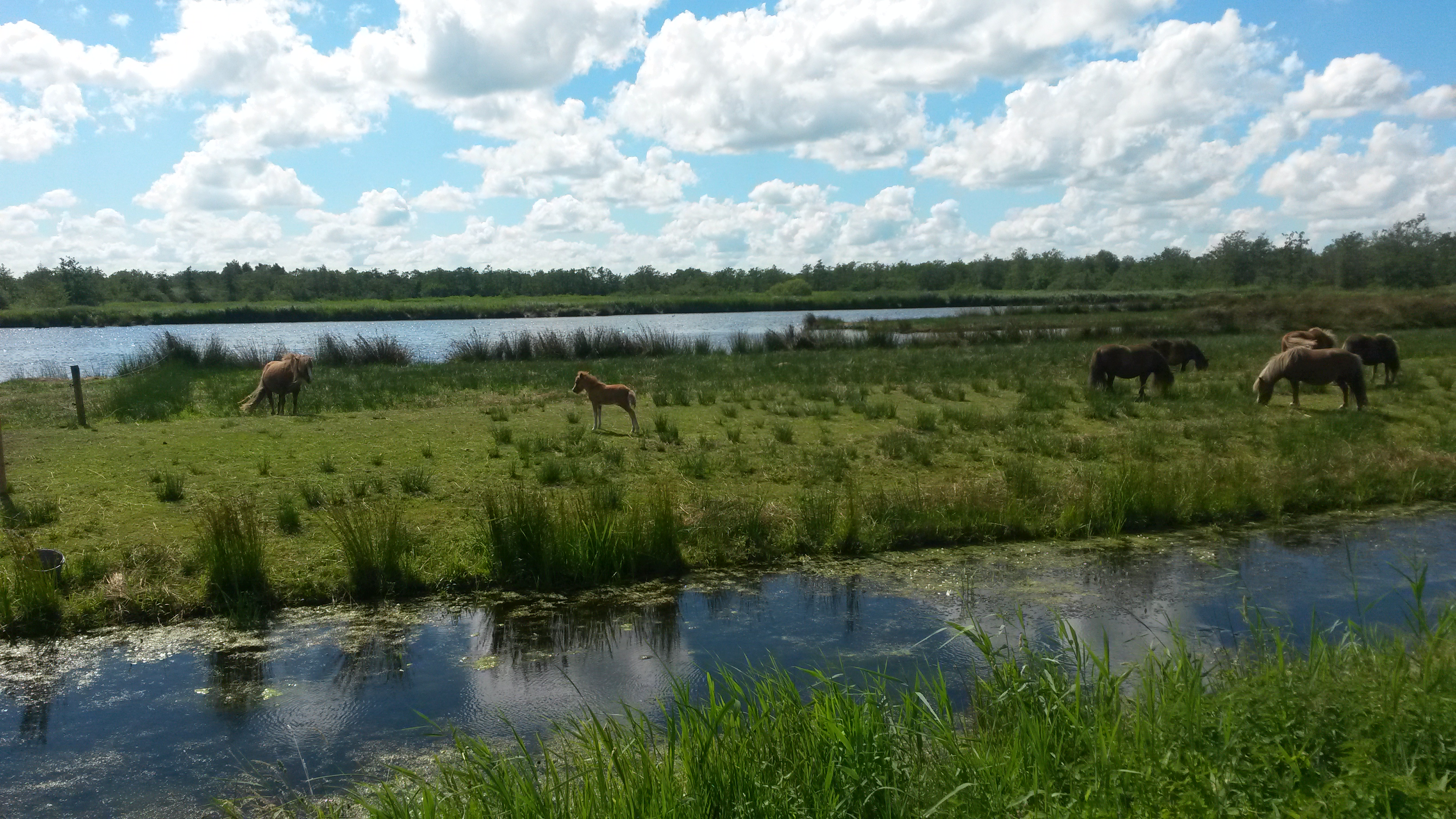
Shetland ponies including foal

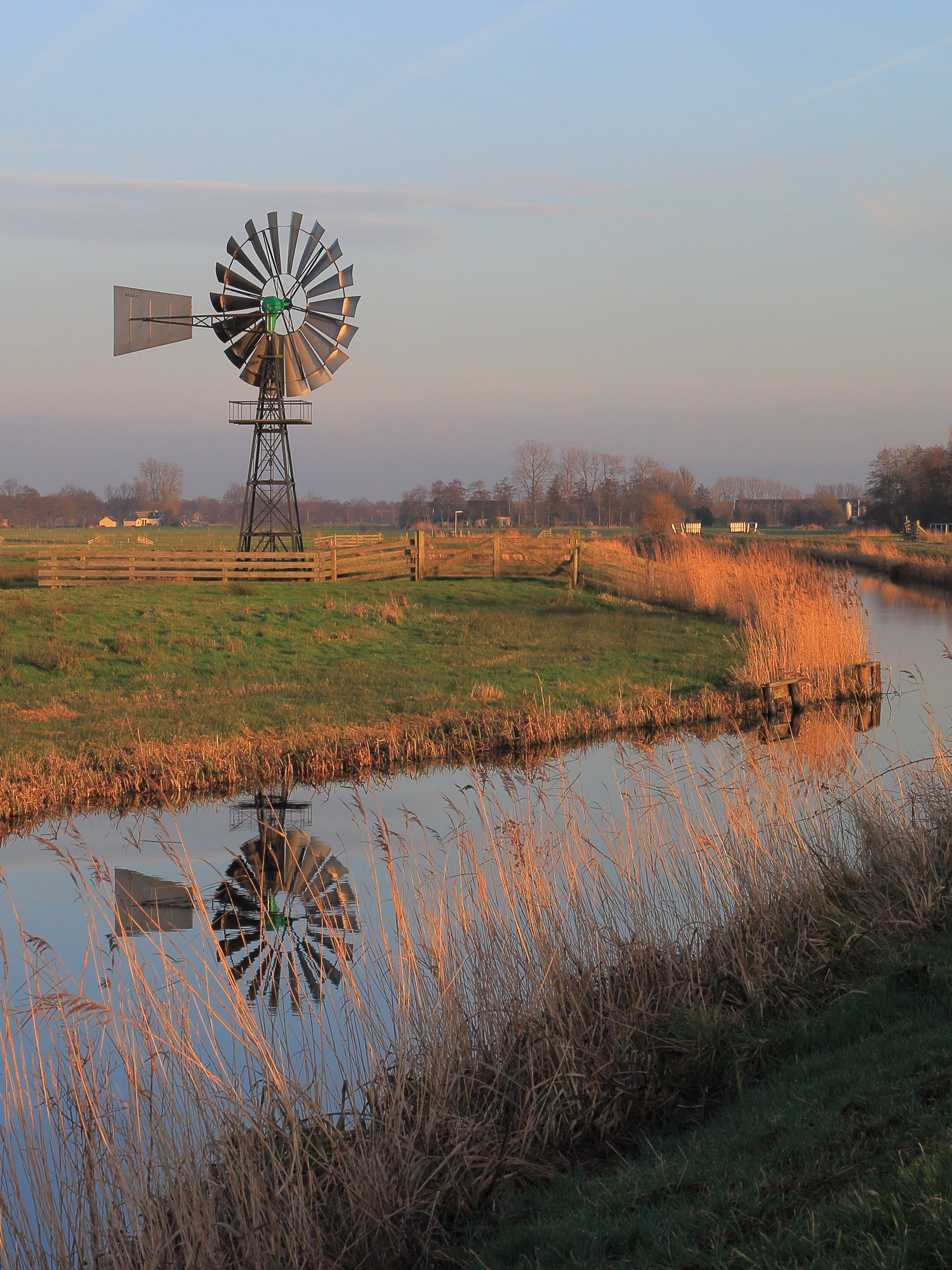
An American windmill in the park
