= Snikzwaag =

Snikzwaag Sniksweach
- Village
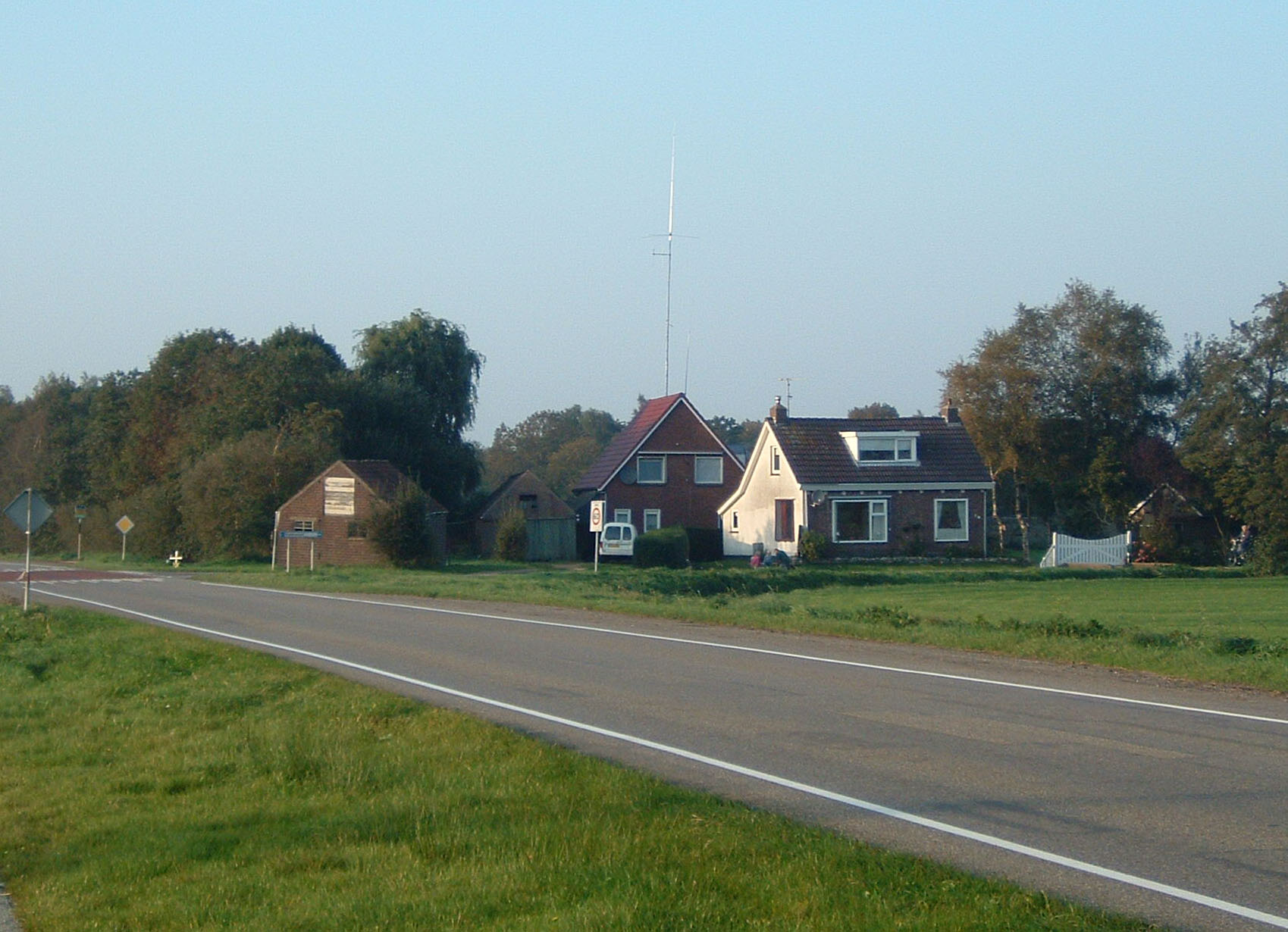

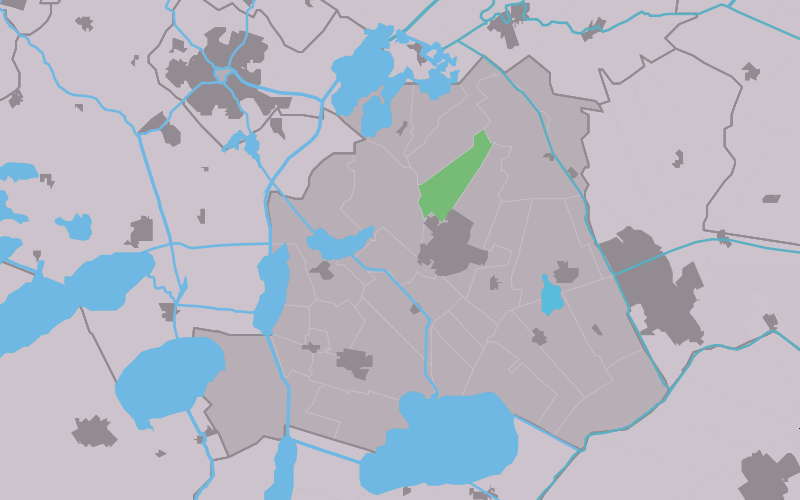
- Location in the former Skarsterlân municipality

- Location in the Netherlands Snikzwaag (Netherlands)
- Country: Netherlands
- Province: Friesland
- Municipality: De Fryske Marren

Area
  - Total: 1.48 km^{2} (0.57 sq mi)
- Elevation: −0.4 m (−1.3 ft)

Population (2021)
  - Total: 65
  - Density: 44/km^{2} (110/sq mi)
- Time zone: UTC+1 (CET)
  - Summer (DST): UTC+2 (CEST)
- Postal code: 8505
- Dialing code: 0513

Snikzwaag (West Frisian: Sniksweach) is a village in De Fryske Marren in the province of Friesland, the Netherlands. It had a population of around 65 in 2017.

== History ==
The village was first mentioned in the 13th century Sneckswach, and means pointed (cattle) pasture. In 1840, Snikzwaag was home to 73 people.

Before 2014, Snikzwaag was part of the Skarsterlân municipality and before 1984 it was part of Haskerland.

== Gallery ==
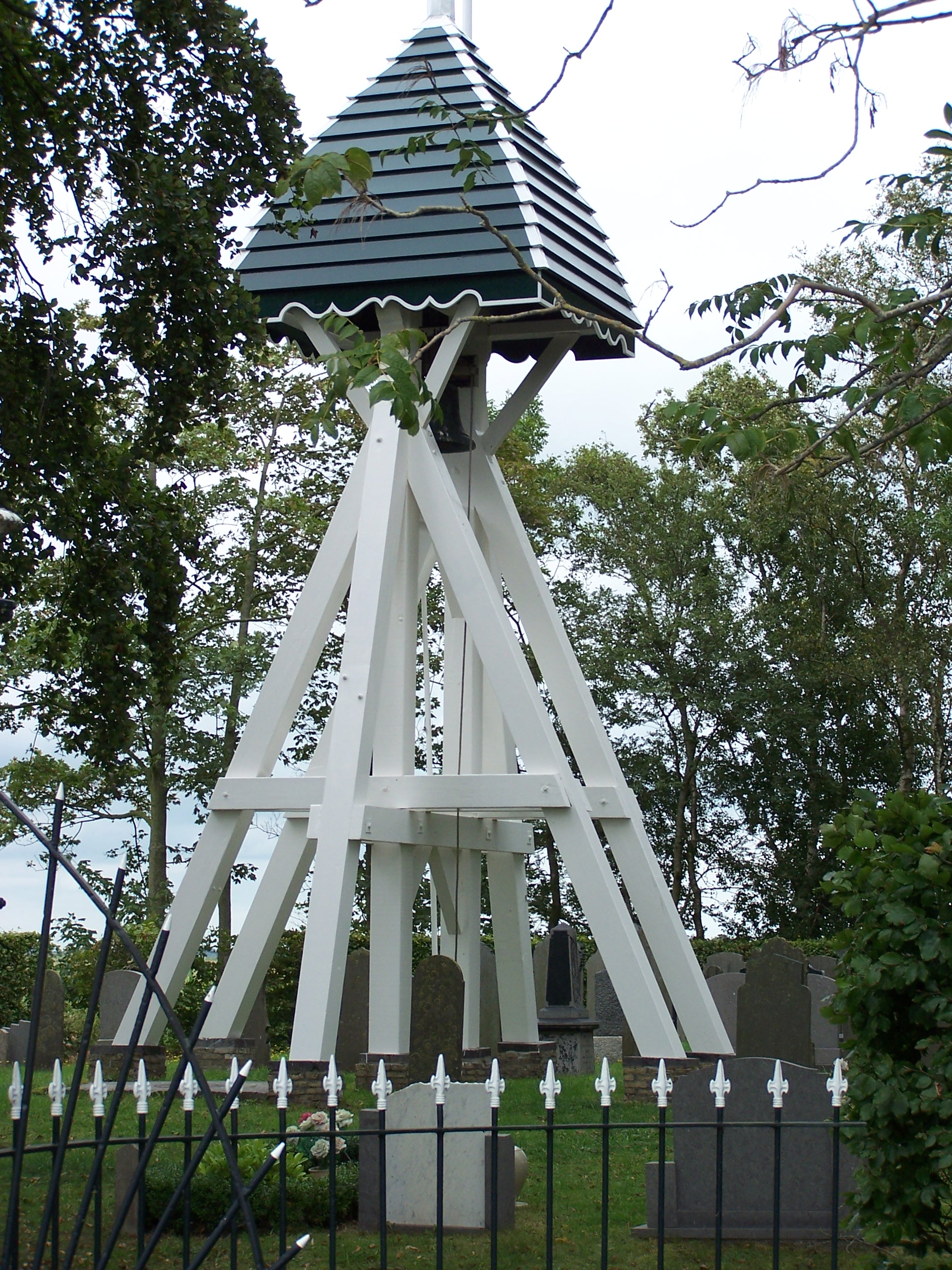
Wooden bell tower

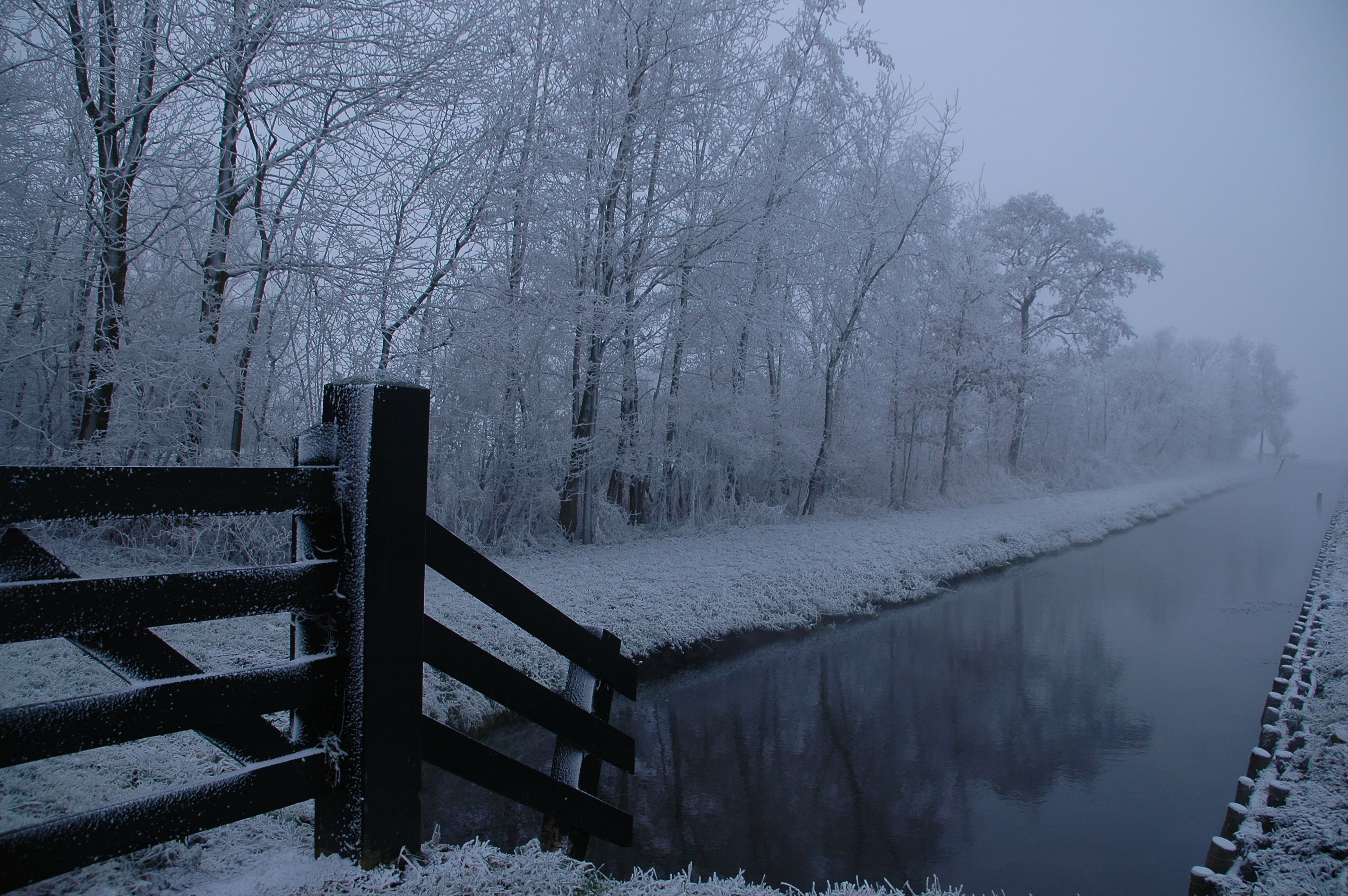
Snikzwaag in winter
