= Molen Hoogland, Goutum =

Windmill in Goutum, Netherlands

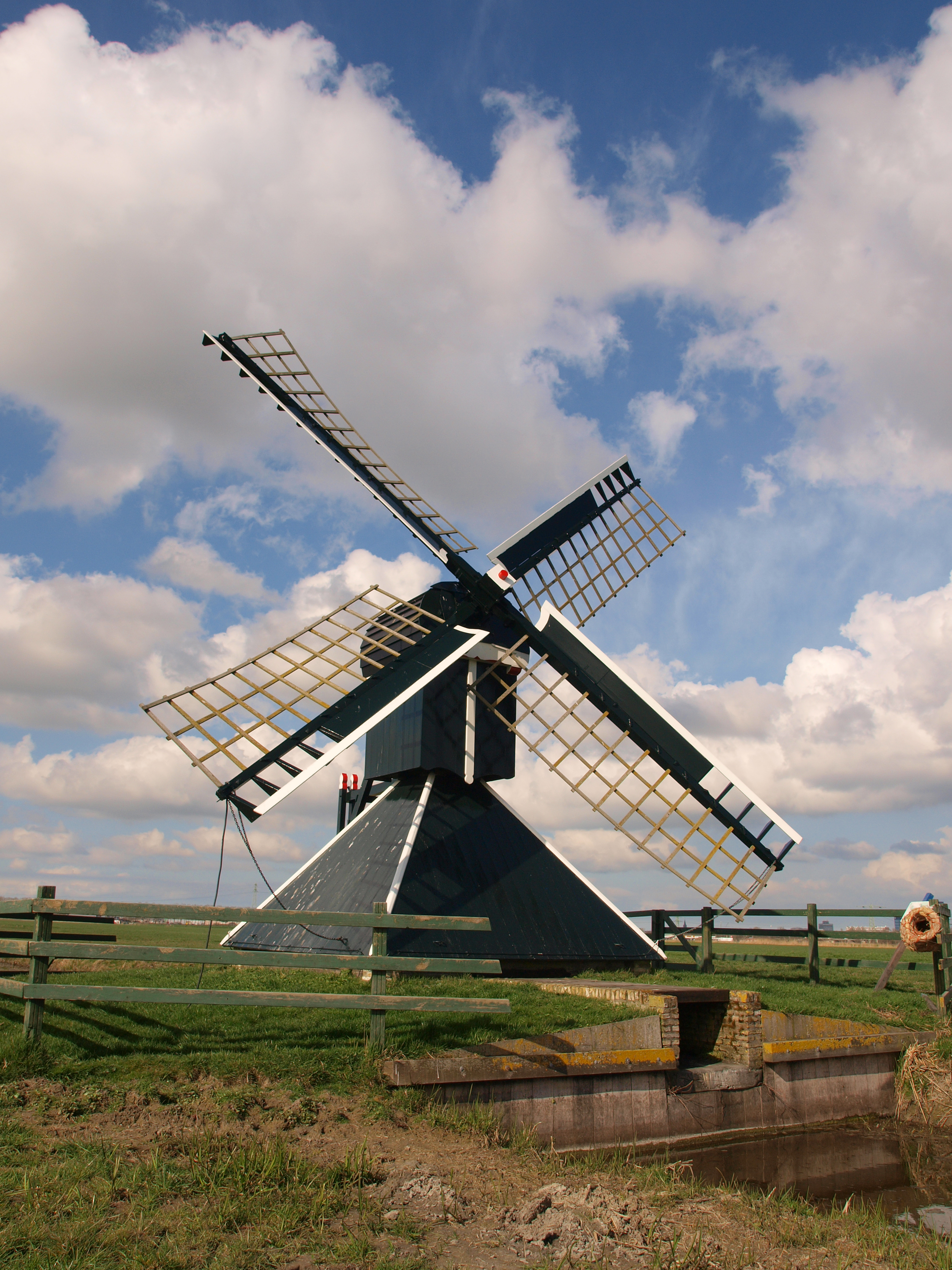
- Molen Hoogland, April 2009

Origin
- Mill name: Molen Hoogland
- Mill location: Boksumerdyk nabij nr. 11, 9084 AA Goutum
- Coordinates: 53.1756°N 5.7803°E
- Operator(s): Stichting De Fryske Mole
- Year built: 2003

Information
- Purpose: Drainage mill
- Type: Hollow Post Mill
- Roundhouse storeys: Single storey roundhouse
- No. of sails: Four sails
- Type of sails: Common sails
- Windshaft: Wood
- Winding: Tailpole and winch
- Type of pump: Archimedes' screw

Molen Hoogland is a Hollow Post mill in Goutum, Friesland, Netherlands which was built in 2004. The mill is listed as a Rijksmonument, number 24521.

== History ==
The mill was originally built in the 18th century at Wirdum to drain the Wirdumer Nieuwland polder, forming a pair with the Kramersmolen. The mill was restored in 1971. The mill was restored in 1968-69. On 23 October 1986, the mill was sold to Stichting De Fryske Mole (English: Frisian Mills Foundation). In 1995, it was moved to Zwette, along with Kramersmolen. On 21 April 1999, the mill was burnt down. The cause was probably arson. A new site was sought at Goutum. The restored mill was officially opened in 2003.

== Description ==
Molen Hoogland is what the Dutch describe as an spinnenkop. It is a hollow post mill on a single storey square roundhouse. The mill is winded by tailpole and winch. The roundhouse and mill body are covered in vertical boards, while the roof of the mill is boarded horizontally. The sails are Common sails. They have a span of 9.24 metres (30 ft 4 in). The sails are carried on a wooden windshaft. The windshaft also carries the brake wheel which has 33 cogs. This drives the wallower (19 cogs) at the top of the upright shaft. At the bottom of the upright shaft, the crown wheel, which has 28 cogs drives a gearwheel with 27 cogs on the axle of the Archimedes' screw. The axle of the Archimedes' screw is 200 millimetres (8 in) diameter. The screw is 740 millimetres (2 ft 5 in) diameter and 3.51 metres (11 ft 6 in) long. It is inclined at 25°. Each revolution of the screw lifts 92 litres (20 imp gal) of water.

== Public access ==
Kramersmolen is open by appointment.
