= Kramersmolen, Goutum =

Windmill in Leeuwarden, Netherlands

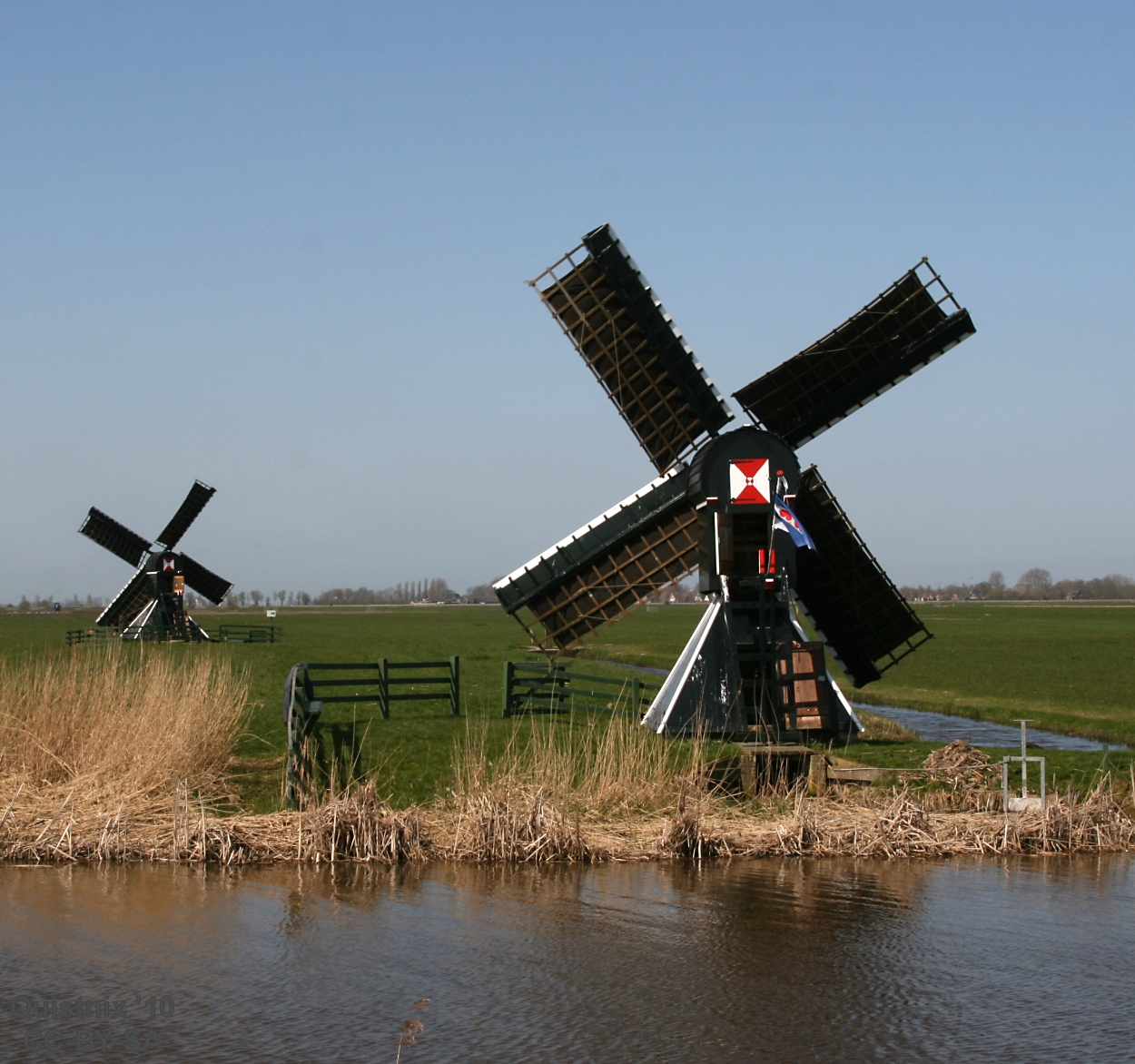

Origin
- Mill name: Kramersmolen
- Mill location: Boksumerdyk 11, 9084 AA Goutum
- Coordinates: 53°10′32″N 5°45′54″E
- Operator: Stichting De Fryske Mole
- Year built: 2002

Information
- Purpose: Drainage mill
- Type: Hollow Post Mill
- Roundhouse storeys: Single storey roundhouse
- No. of sails: Four sails
- Type of sails: Common sails
- Windshaft: Wood
- Winding: Tailpole and winch
- Type of pump: Archimedes' screw

Kramersmolen is a hollow post mill in Goutum, Friesland, Netherlands which was built in 2002. The mill is listed as a Rijksmonument, number 24508.

== History ==
The mill was originally built in the 18th century at Wirdum to drain the Wirdumer Nieuwland polder. At Wirdum, it was also known by the name of Old Barrahûs. It has always formed a pair with Molen Hoogland. On 1 March 1949, the cap and sails were blown of in a storm. The mill was soon repaired. The mill was restored in 1968-69. On 30 September 1986, the mill was sold to Stichting De Fryske Mole (English: Frisian Mills Foundation). In 1995, it was moved to Zwette, along with Molen Hoogland. Following the latter mill's destruction by fire in 1999, another site was sought and the mill was moved to Goutum in 2002. The mill was officially re-opened on 24 October 2002. The mill is kept in full working order and held in reserve should it be needed in an emergency.

== Description ==
Kramersmolen is what the Dutch describe as an spinnenkop. It is a hollow post mill on a single storey square roundhouse. The mill is winded by tailpole and winch. The roundhouse and mill body are covered in vertical boards, while the roof of the mill is boarded horizontally. The sails are common sails. They have a span of 8.35 metres (27 ft 5 in). The sails are carried on a wooden windshaft. The windshaft also carries the brake wheel which has 26 cogs. This drives the wallower (15 cogs) at the top of the upright shaft. At the bottom of the upright shaft, the crown wheel, which has 26 cogs drives a gearwheel with 25 cogs on the axle of the Archimedes' screw. The axle of the Archimedes' screw is 200 millimetres (8 in) diameter. The screw is 680 millimetres (2 ft 3 in) diameter. Each revolution of the screw lifts 81 litres (18 imp gal) of water.

== Public access ==
Kramersmolen is open by appointment.
