= Protestant church of Goutum =

Church in Goutum, Netherlands

Protestant church of Goutum Saint Agnes church
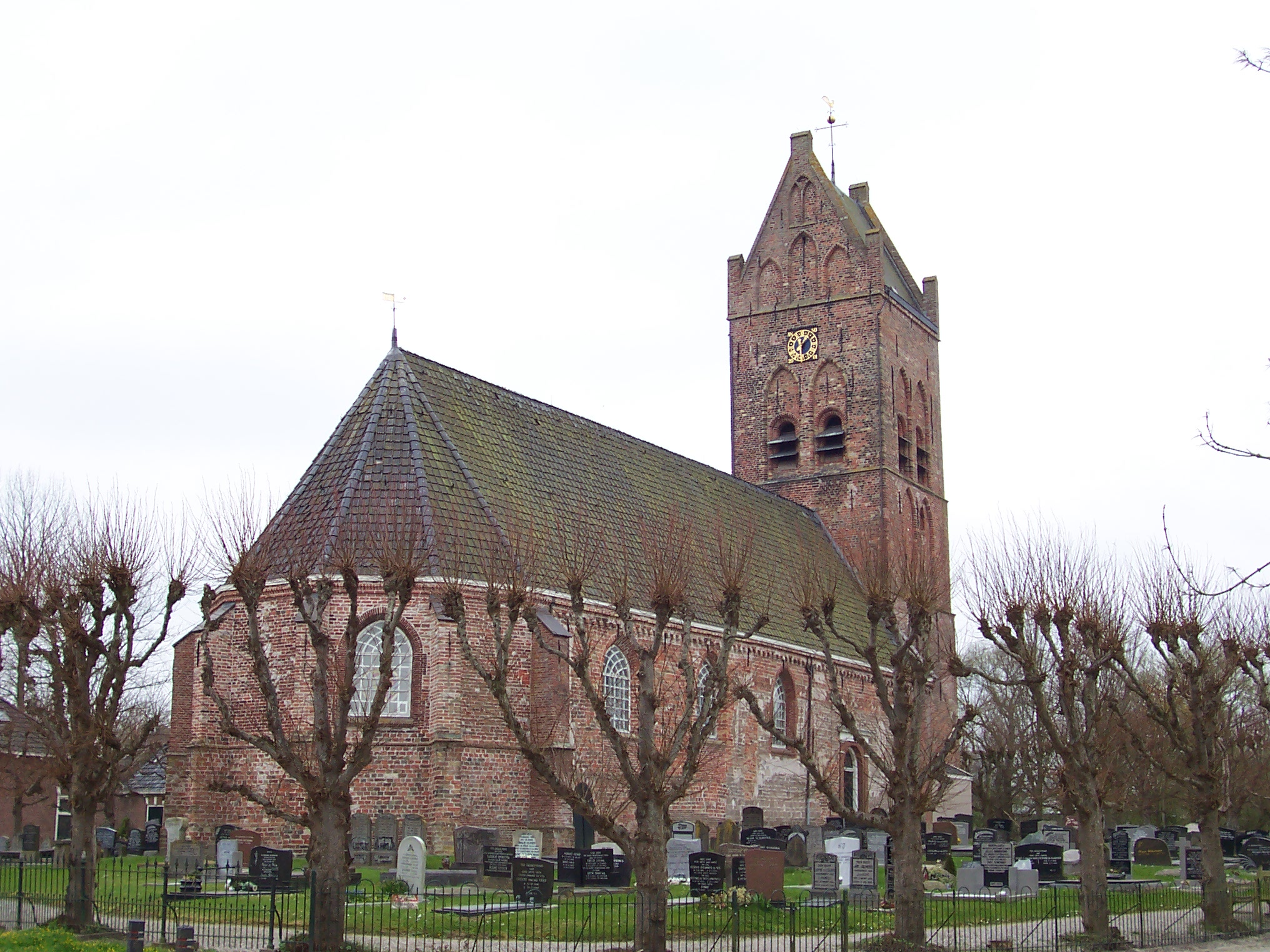
- Church of Goutum
- Protestant church of Goutum; Saint Agnes church
- 53.1785°N 5.8068°E

History
- Dedication: Before the Reformation, to Saint Agnes

Specifications
- Materials: Brick

The Protestant church of Goutum or Saint Agnes church is a medieval religious building in Goutum, Friesland, Netherlands. On the northern side remnants of an older tufa church from the 11th century or 12th century can be seen.

The church was enlarged and heightened with brick in the 15th century and has a tower from the same century. The church was originally a Roman Catholic church dedicated to Saint Agnes, becoming a Protestant church after the Protestant Reformation. It is listed as a Rijksmonument, number 24509. The building is located at 23 Buorren.
