= Goutum =

- Village
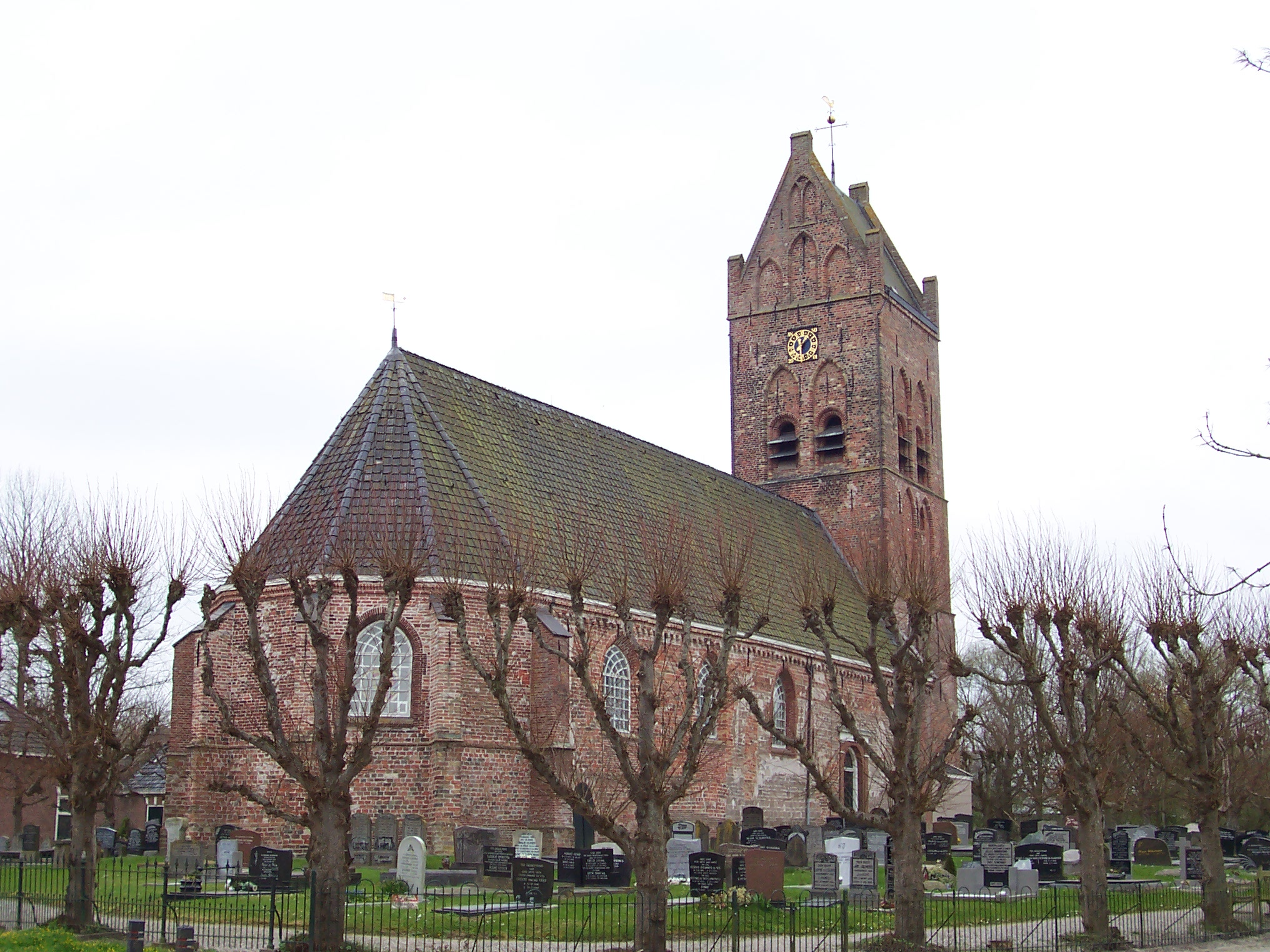
- St Agnes Church

- Flag Coat of arms

- Location in the Netherlands Goutum (Netherlands)
- Country: Netherlands
- Province: Friesland
- Municipality: Leeuwarden

Area
  - Total: 1.51 km^{2} (0.58 sq mi)
- Elevation: 0.6 m (2.0 ft)

Population (2021)
  - Total: 3,310
  - Density: 2,190/km^{2} (5,680/sq mi)
- Time zone: UTC+1 (CET)
  - Summer (DST): UTC+2 (CEST)
- Postal code: 9084
- Dialing code: 058

Goutum is a village in the municipality Leeuwarden in the province of Friesland, the Netherlands. It had a population of around 2,945 in January 2017. It is still an independent village, but is surrounded by the city of Leeuwarden on all sides.

There are two windmills in Goutum, Kramersmolen and Molen Hoogland.

== History ==
The village was first mentioned in 1366 as Goeltum, and means "settlement of Golde (person)". It was sometimes referred to as Dola-Goutum (Goutum on the border) to distinguish between Scharnegoutum. Goutum developed on several terps (artificial living mounds) in the Middle Ages.

The stins Wiarda State was located near Goutum, and was first mentioned in the 14th century. It was owned by the son of Sjoerd Wiarda, the potestaat (comparable to governor) of Friesland. In 1481, the Wiardas and the villagers of Goutum participated in an attack on the city of Leeuwarden, and were defeated. In 1482, Wiarda State was demolished by Leeuwarden.

The Protestant church of Goutum dates from the 15th century and is located on top of a terp. The church has 11th and 12th century elements.

In 1840, Goutum was home to 252 people. For most of its history, Goutum was a small village to the south of the provincial capital Leeuwarden. In 1944, it became part of the municipality of Leeuwarden. In 1948, Goutum was physically cut off from Leeuwarden by the construction of the van Harinxmakanaal.

In the 1980s, the city planned to build thousands of houses near Goutum, however the village fought the city up to the Council of State and won. In 1990, new neighbourhoods started to appear near Goutum, but at a distance. As of 2021, it can be considered an enclave, however it still has its own statistical area, postal code, village house and village identity.

== Notable buildings ==
- The Protestant church of Goutum
- The Kramersmolen
- The Molen Hoogland

== Gallery ==
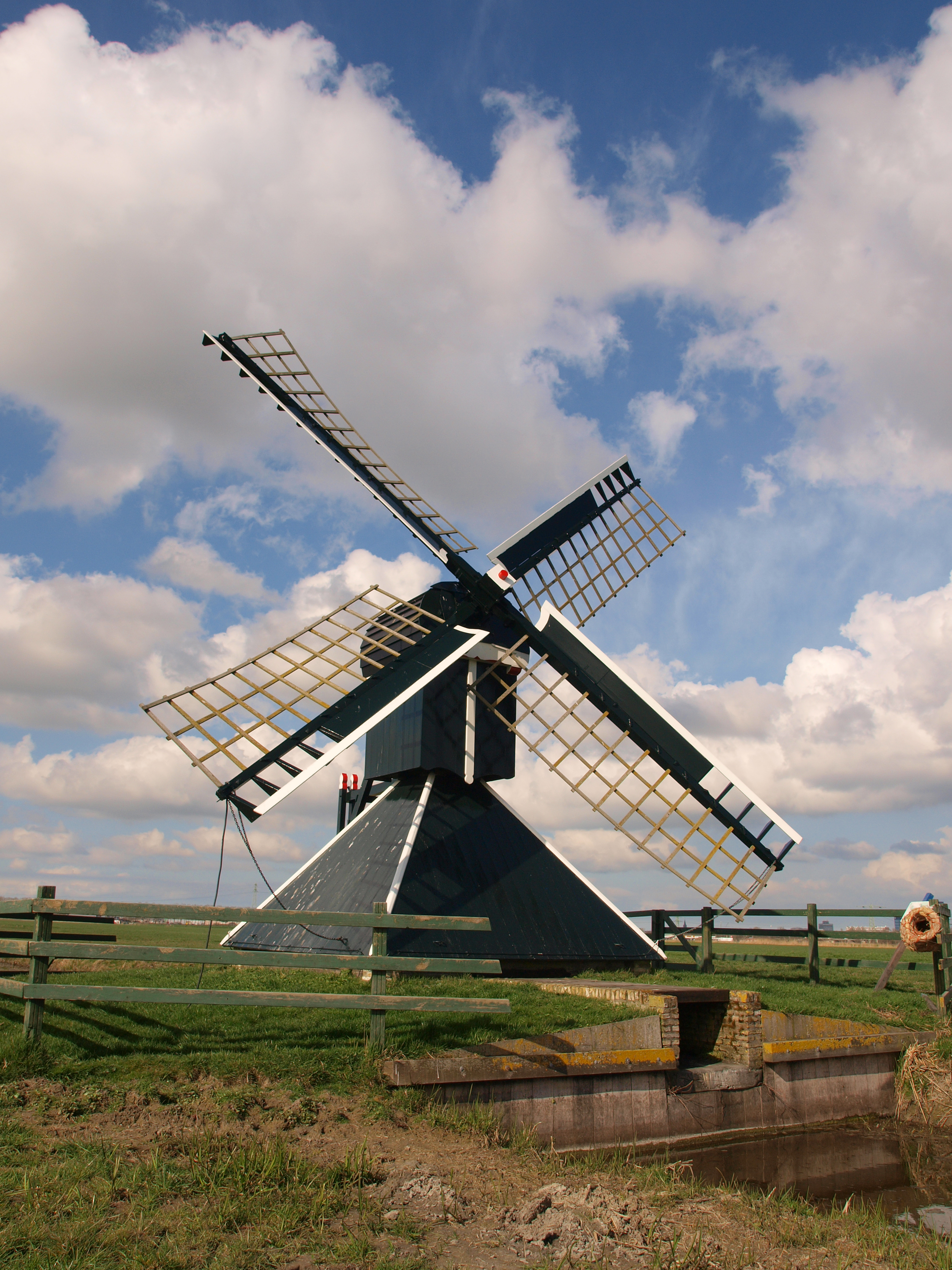
Hoogland mill

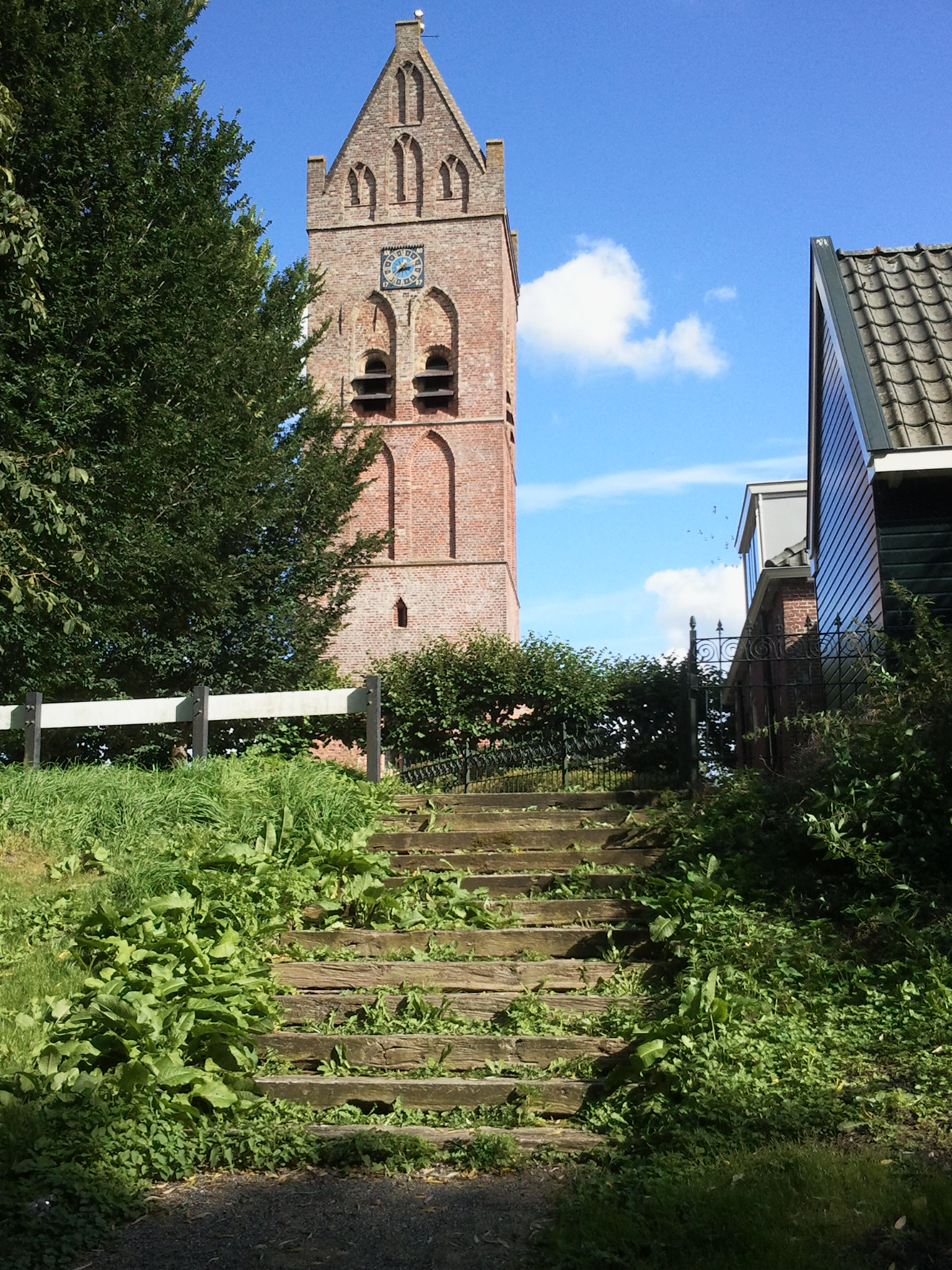
De terp

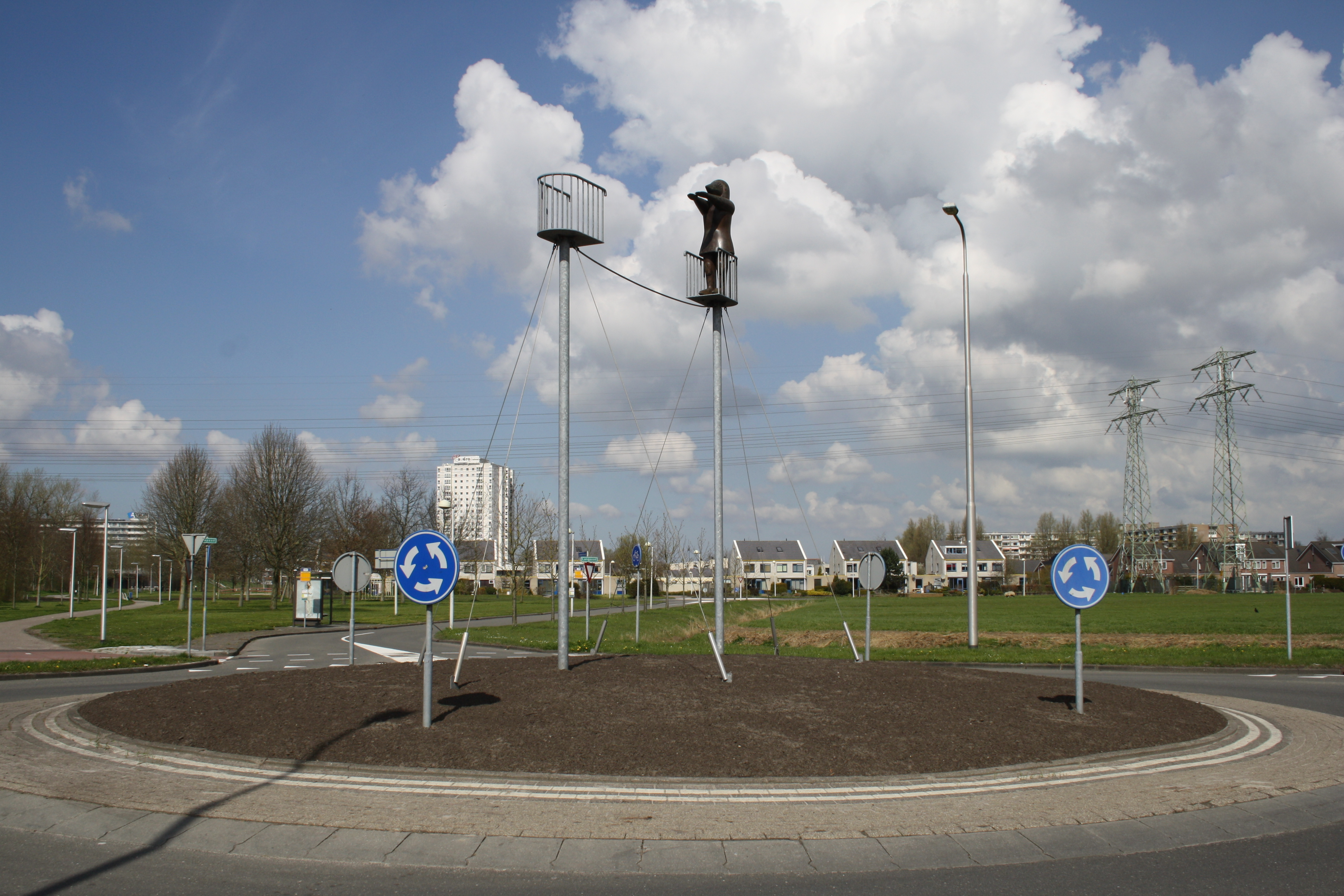
Art on the roundabout with the city in the background

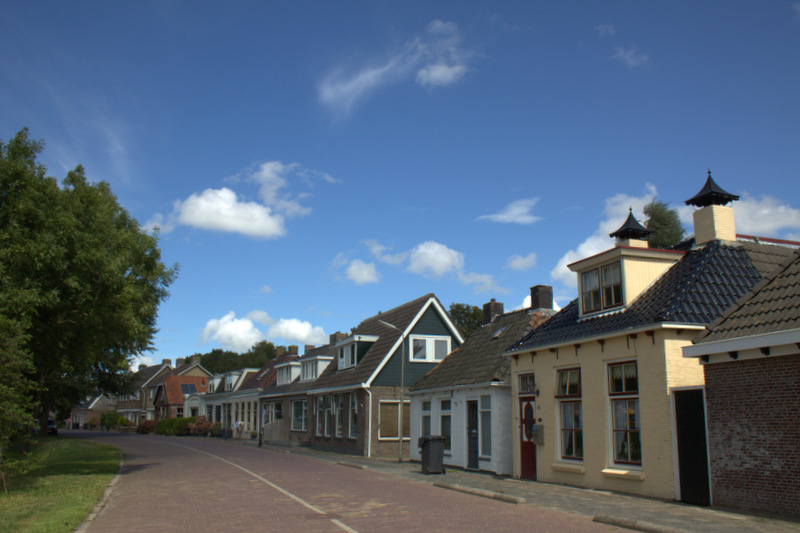
Village street
