= Wirdum, Friesland =

Wirdum Wurdum
- Village
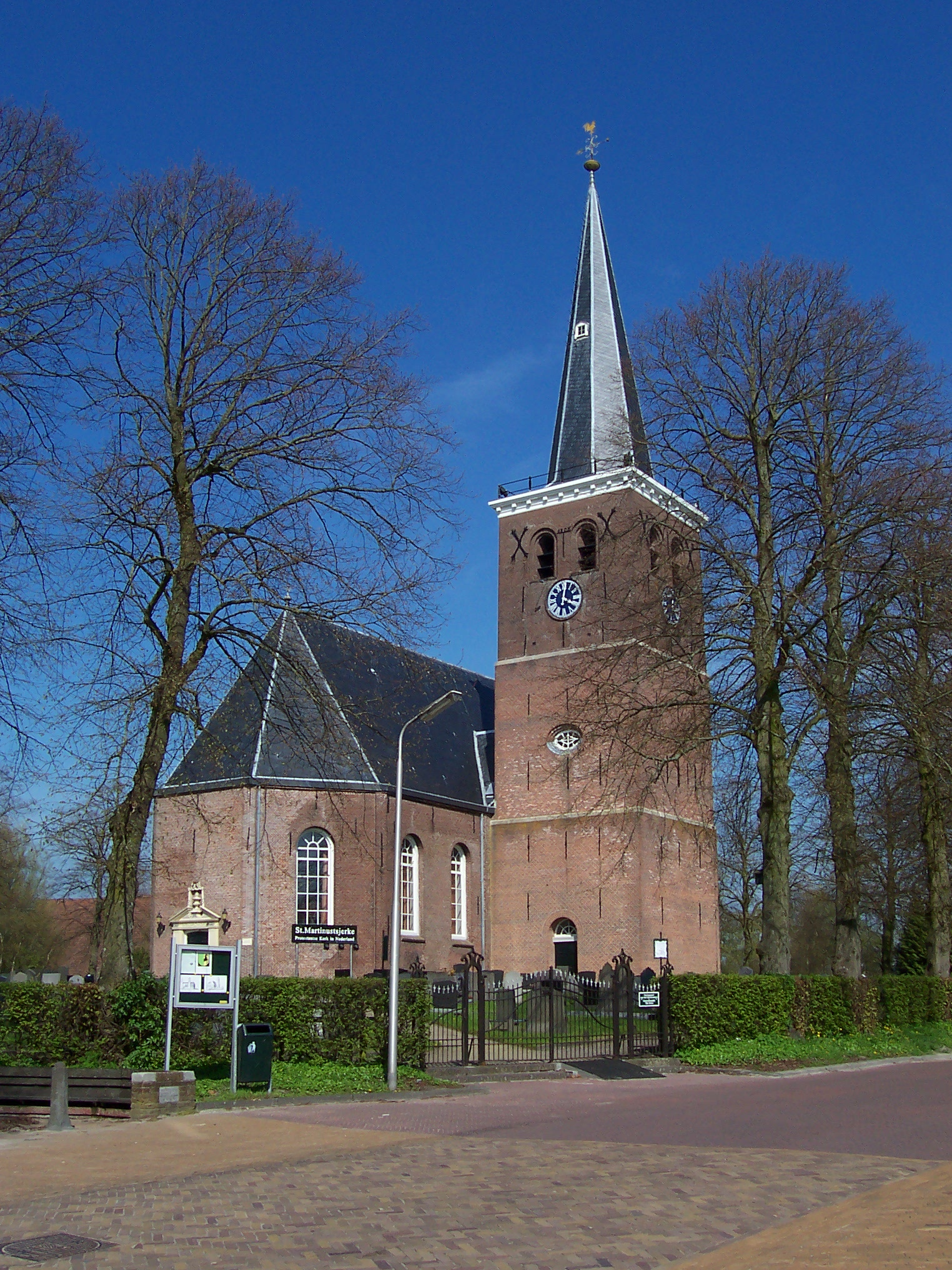
- St Martin's Church

- Flag Coat of arms

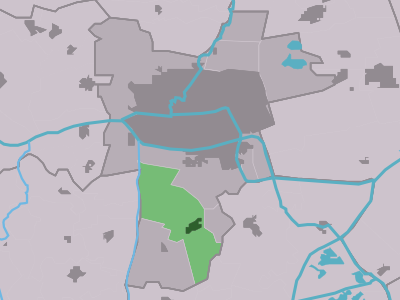
- Location in the Leeuwarden municipality

- Location in the Netherlands Wirdum (Netherlands)
- Coordinates: 53°8′59″N 5°48′14″E
- Country: Netherlands
- Province: Friesland
- Municipality: Leeuwarden

Area
  - Total: 7.62 km^{2} (2.94 sq mi)
- Elevation: 0.2 m (0.66 ft)

Population (2021)
  - Total: 1,135
  - Density: 149/km^{2} (386/sq mi)
- Time zone: UTC+1 (CET)
  - Summer (DST): UTC+2 (CEST)
- Postal code: 9088
- Dialing code: 058

Wirdum (West Frisian: Wurdum) is a village in Leeuwarden municipality in the province of Friesland, the Netherlands. It had a population of around 1,060 in January 2017.

== History ==
The village was first mentioned in 1335 as Weerdum, and means "settlement on the terp". Wirdum developed on the terp (artificial living mount) in the Middle Ages. It used to be only accessible by water until road connections in the middle of the 19th century.

St-Martin's village church was a tufa building in the 12th century. In the 13th century the nave was enlarged and since then it has been a brick building. In the 14th century a tower was added on the south side. The nave was altered in Baroque style, the tower in the 19th century.

In 1840, Wirdum was home to 665 people. In 1891, a dairy factory opened in Wirdum and remained open until 1964. In 2014, a treasure of 96 coins dating between 850 and 860 were discovered in the terp.

== Gallery ==
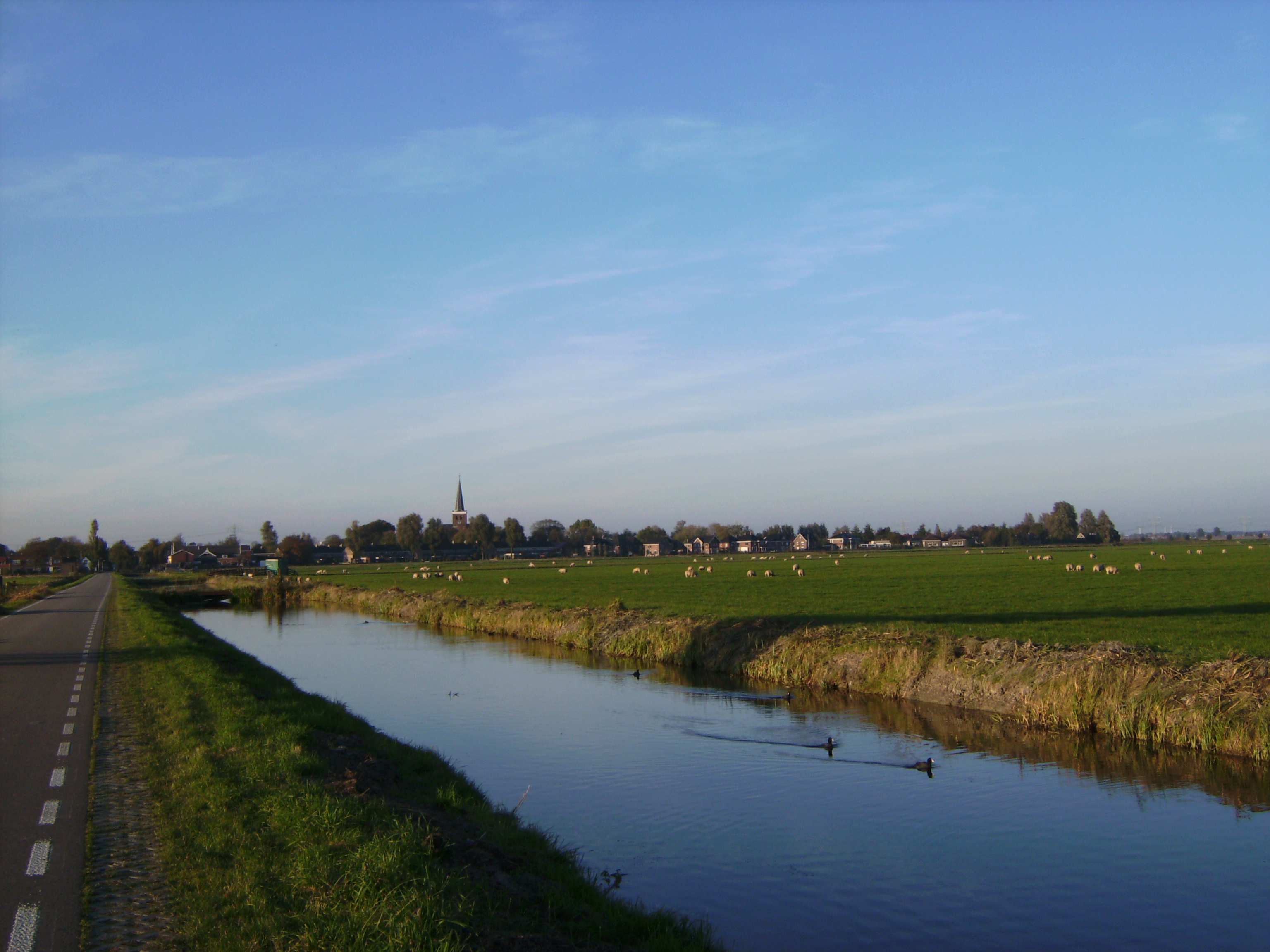
Village view

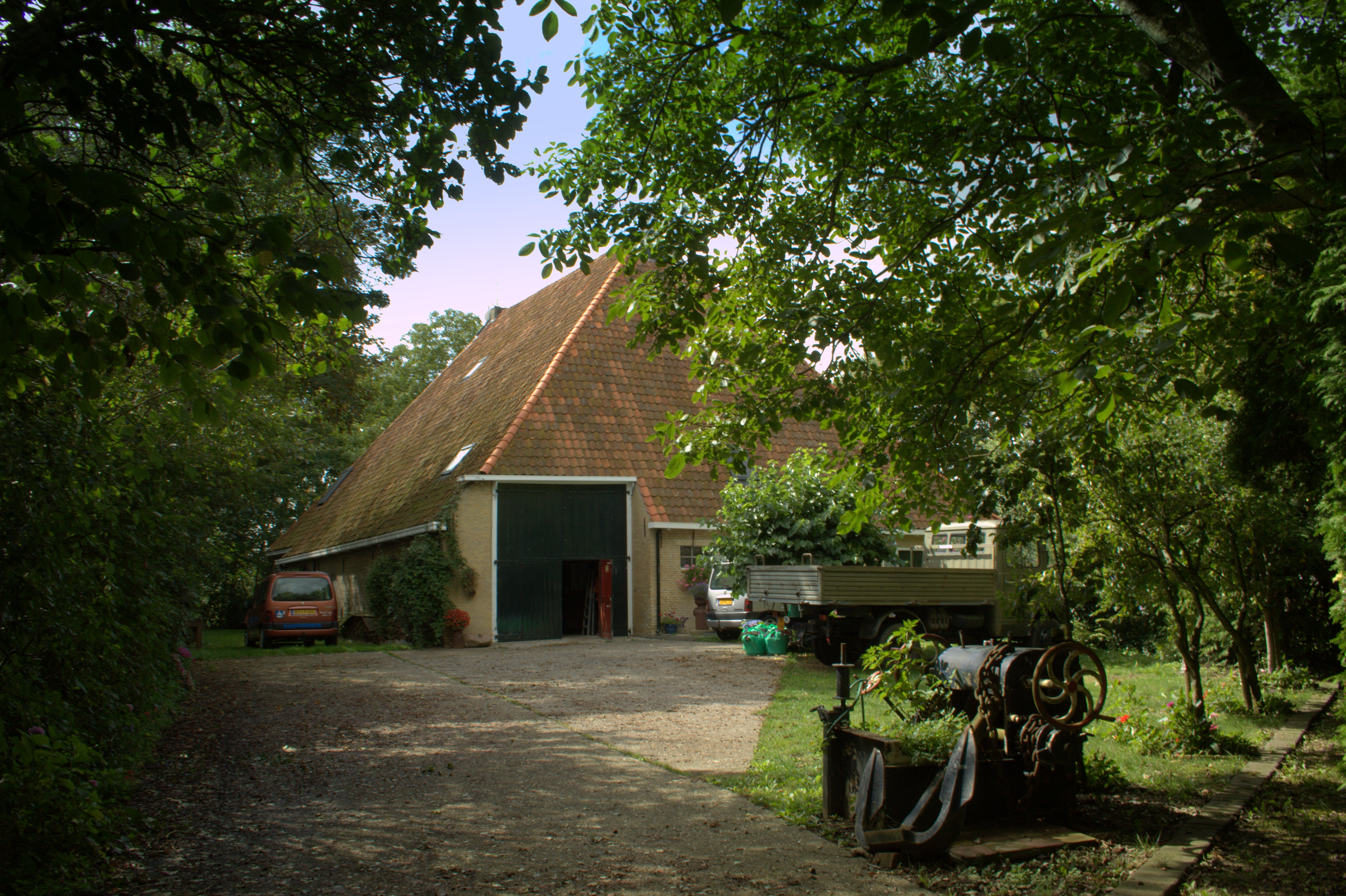
Farm in Wirdum

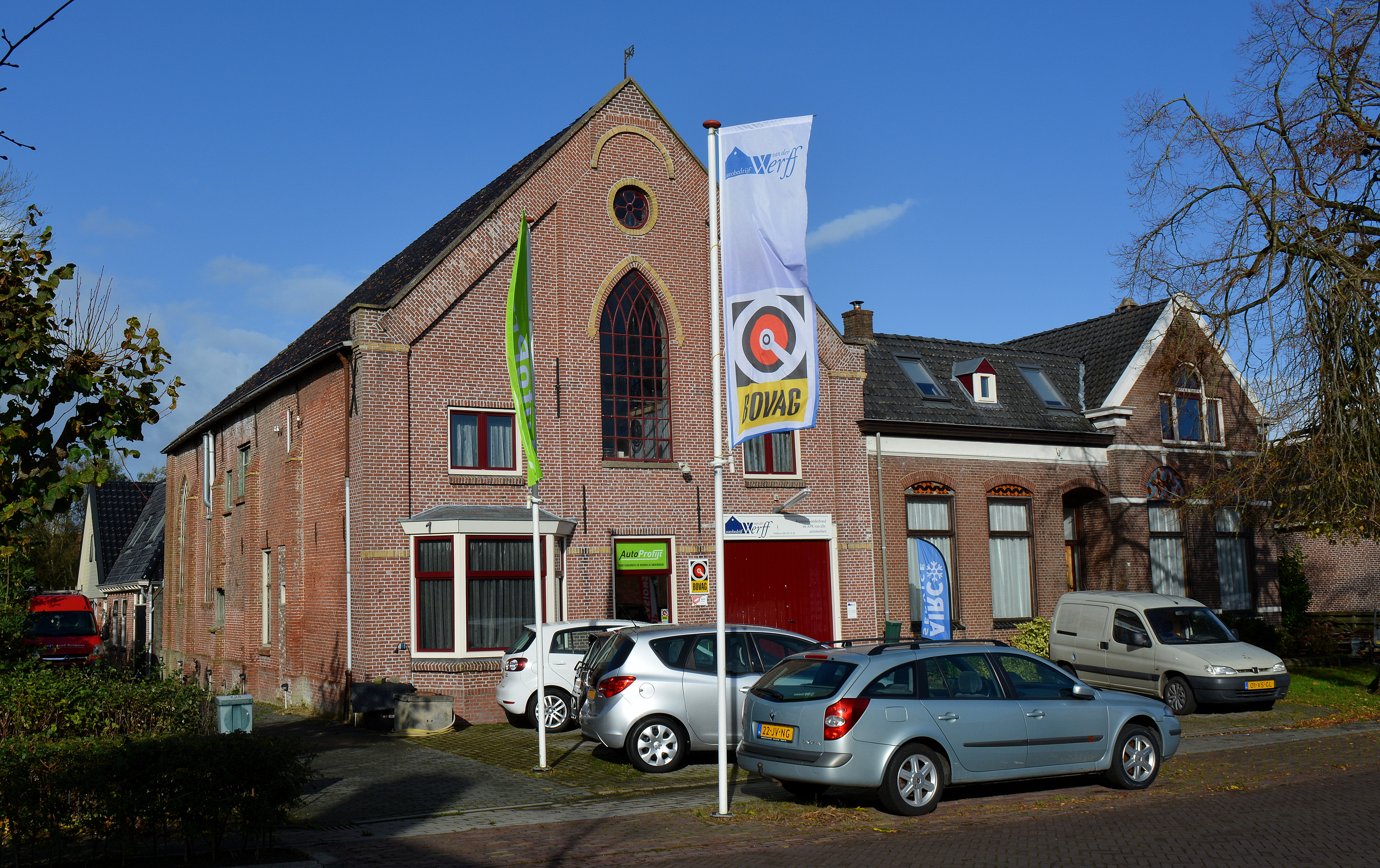
Old Reformed Church turned into a car dealership

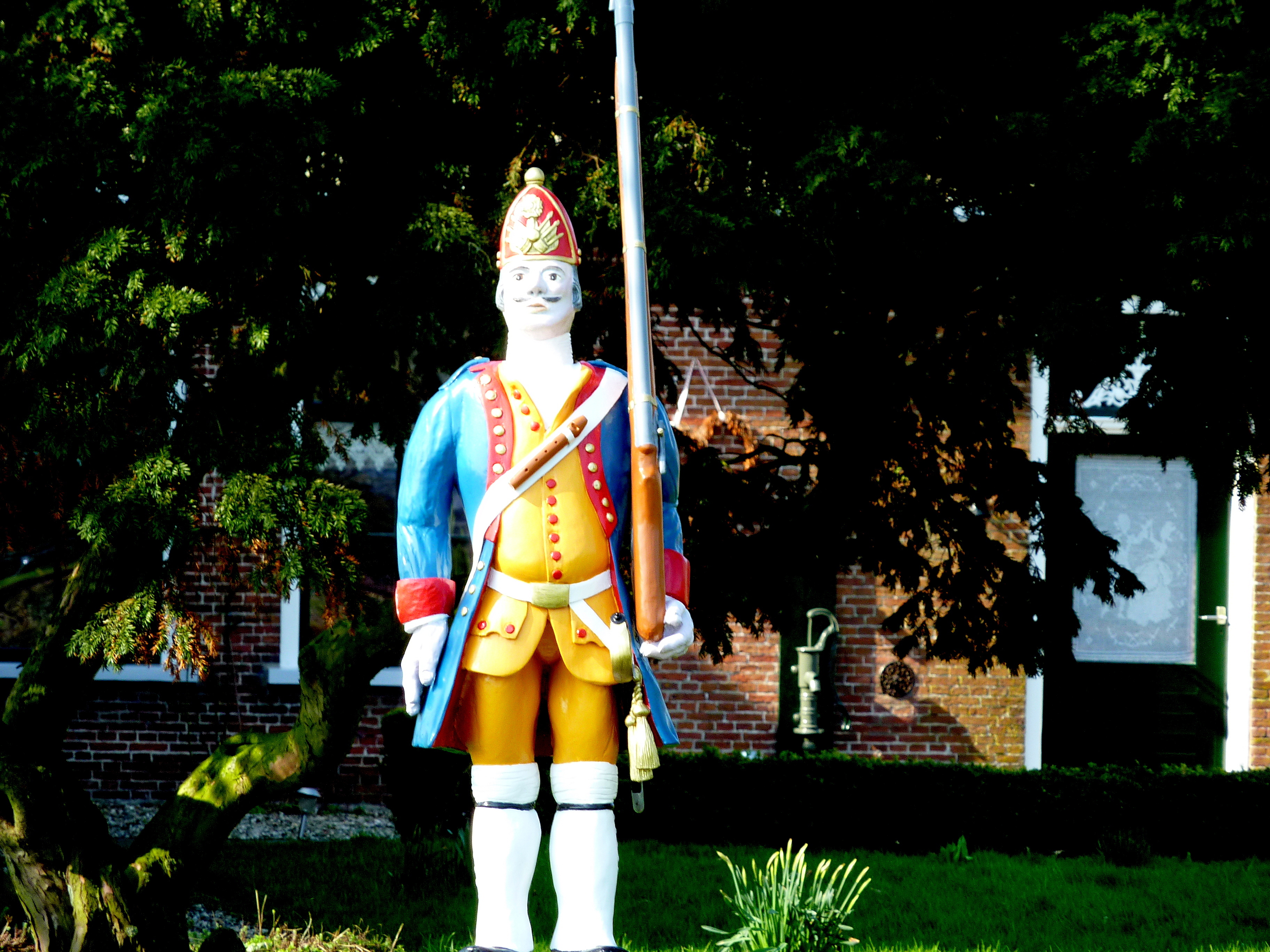
Soldier on guard
