= Poptagasthuis =

Charitable guesthouse and monument

Coordinates: 53°12′38″N 5°43′47″E

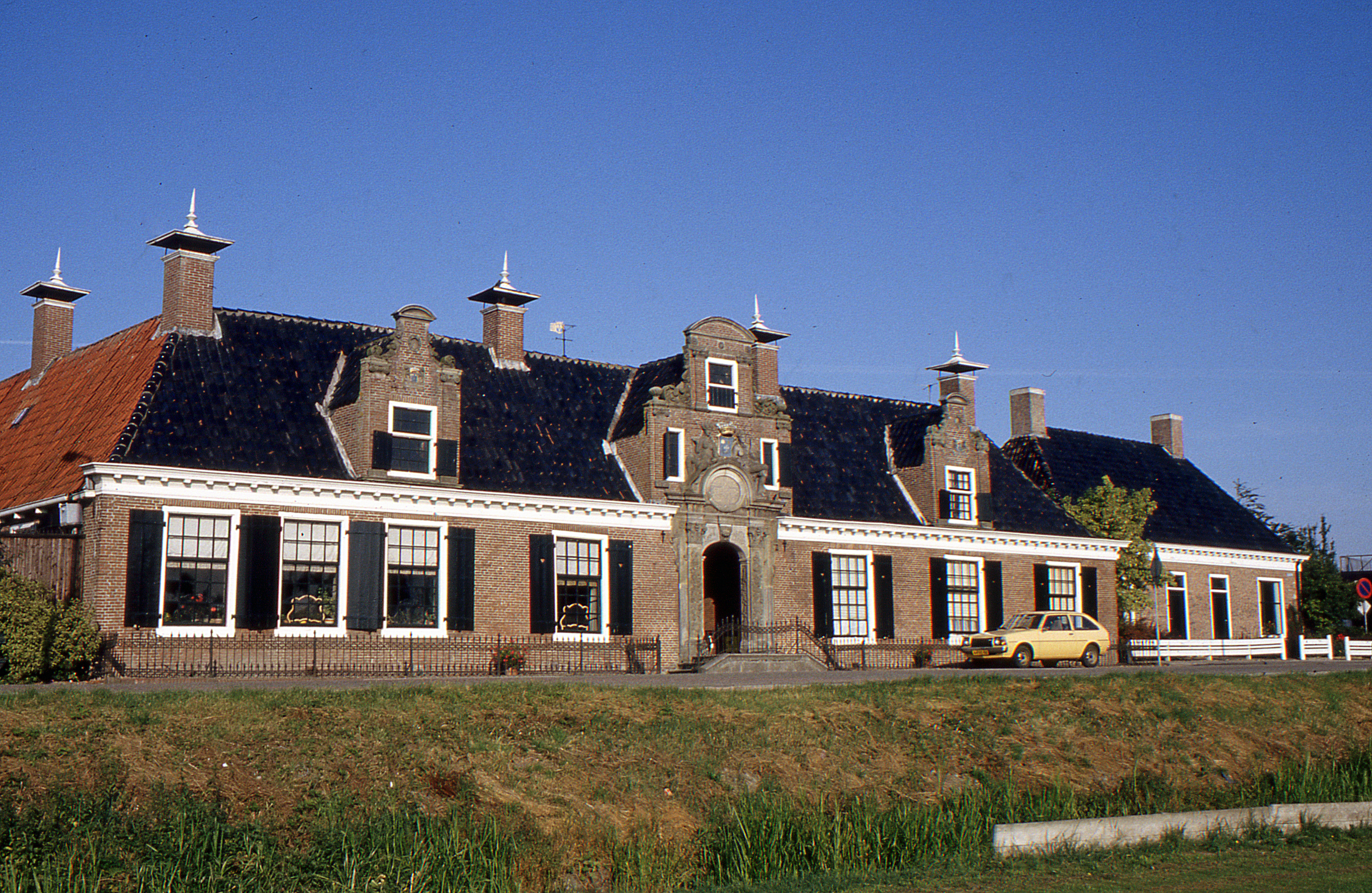

The Poptagasthuis is a hofje (almshouse) in Marsum in the Dutch province of Fryslân. It is a rijksmonument.

== History ==
Dr. Henricus Popta, a successful lawyer, started the project in 1710, and construction started in 1711, funded by Popta. At Popta's death in 1712 Poptaslot, his home located to the south, was left to guardians. The guardians inaugurated the almshouse on 13 May 1713, half a year after Popta's death. The building originally had 26 one-room apartments around the courtyard. The passage in the middle of the east wing on the Hegedyk has an entrance with a neck gable. The entrance frame in Louis XIV style with Corinthian pilasters is crowned by two allegorical female figures and the arms of Popta. The short wings on the east and west side have neck gables with claw pieces. It has Flemish style frontage.

In 1852 a line of houses was built to the north, along the Buorren. A sandstone gate (1713) with Corinthian pilasters, festoons and decorative vases gives access from these houses to the courtyard apartments. In 1952 the one-room apartments were converted to larger living units. and the washing house was converted into a kettle house. The east wing has a "gentlemen's room" which is also a museum. The almshouse is still run by 4 guardians, in accordance with Popta’s testament. Maintenance is still paid with Popta's legacy. Popta wanted the almshouse to be a safe haven for poor women, where they would be housed, clothed and fed as long as they lived quiet, modest and peaceful lives. Popta wanted his almshouse to remain open until the Christian end times, but he wanted it to be open for women of every religion, though he did not explicitly mention Judaism, while mentioning all other religions he knew. This was important at the time, as parishes of non-state-endorsed religions were not allowed to own properties. It was intended primarily for elderly women.
