= Henricus Popta =

Dutch lawyer (b. 1635, d. 1712)

Personal details
- Born: 3 May 1635 Leeuwarden, Friesland, Dutch Republic
- Died: 7 November 1712 (aged 77) Dêre
- Resting place: Marssum St. Pontianus Church
- Parents: Tjebbe Jacobs Popta (father); Walcke Hendrix Hanenburg (mother)

Henricus Popta (3 May 1635 – 7 November 1712) was a Dutch lawyer.

== Early life ==
He was the second-oldest child. His older brother died before his birth. Born poor, he became rich.

His father, Tjebbe Jacobs Popta, was an alcoholic.

He was baptized on August 20, 1654.

== Career ==
He became what in Dutch is called Advocaat bij het hof, a relatively high position.

== Poptaslot ==
In 1687, he bought what would later be known as the Poptaslot. He decided that after his death it would never be inhabited again. He intended for it to be kept in the same state as when he died. To accomplish this he appointed four guardians, one of whom was his servant—an unusual choice in the period. The house became a museum. He provided housing for widows.

He also founded the charitable Poptagasthuis for women, which is now a monument.

== Death ==
He died on November 7, 1712 in Leeuwarden.
