= Terpzigt, Marssum =

Windmill in Marssum, Netherlands

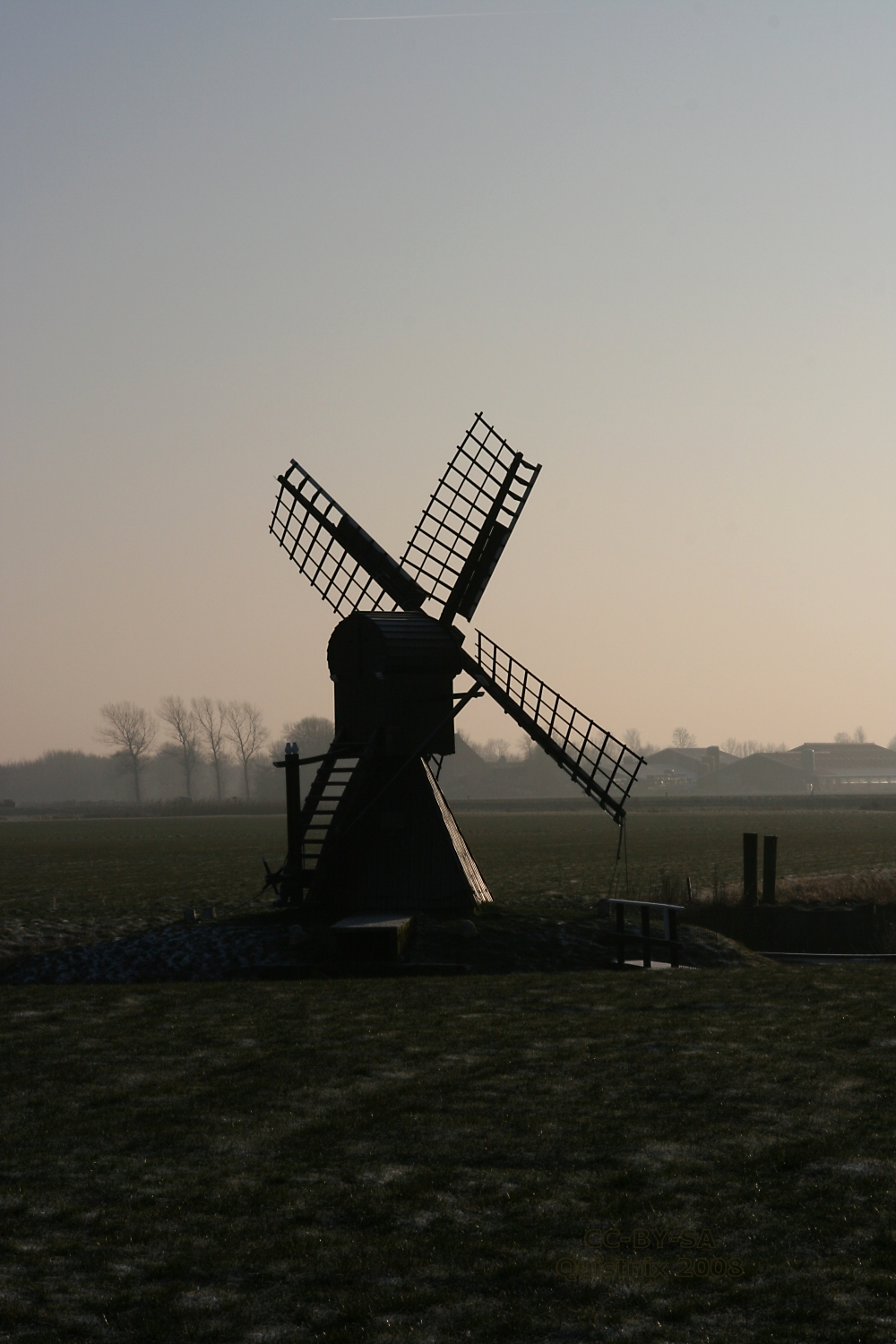
- Terpzigt in 2008
- Interactive map of Terpzigt, Marssum

Origin
- Mill name: Terpzigt
- Mill location: Marssum
- Coordinates: 53°12′14″N 5°43′28″E
- Operator: Stichting Molens in Menaldumadeel
- Year built: 1888, restored 1981

Information
- Purpose: Drainage mill
- Type: Hollow post
- Roundhouse storeys: Single storey roundhouse
- No. of sails: Four sails
- Type of sails: Common sails
- Windshaft: Wood
- Winding: Tailpole and winch
- Type of pump: Archimedes' screw

Terpzigt is a drainage mill in Marssum, Friesland, Netherlands. It is the smallest spinnenkop, a type of hollow post windmill. The mill is listed as a Rijksmonument, number 8625.

== History ==
The windmill was built in 1888. Before the merger of several waterboards it drained the polder Tolsma. It was restored to working order in 1981 by millwright Dijkstra from Giekerk though it can no longer drain water from the polder, instead it pumps water round in a circuit. In 2011 the windshaft and stocks were replaced.

== Description ==
Terpzigt is what the Dutch describe as a "spinnenkop" (English: spiderhead mill). It is a small hollow post mill winded by a winch. The four common sails have a span of 8.2 metres (26 ft 11 in) and are carried on a wooden windshaft. The brake wheel on the windshaft drives the wallower at the top of the upright shaft, which passed through the main post. At the bottom of the upright shaft, the crown wheel drives the Archimedes' screw. The screw is 0.72 metres (2 ft 4 in) in diameter and can lift 105 litres (23 imp gal) of water per revolution. The body and substructure are weatherboarded.

== Public access ==
The mill is open to the public by appointment.
