= De Marssumermolen =

Smock mill in Marsum, Friesland, Netherlands

De Marssummermolen, Marsum
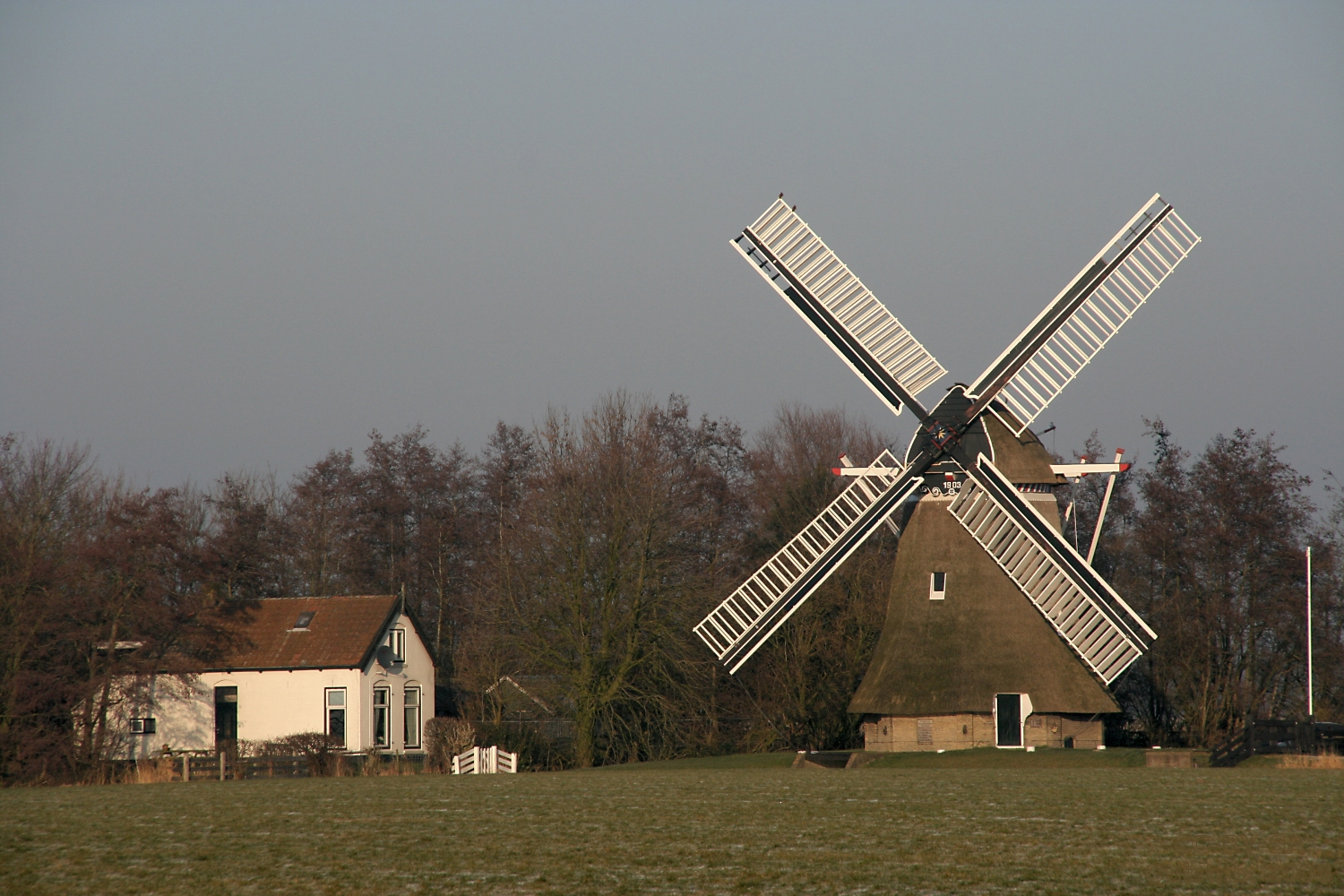
- De Marssummermolen, December 2008.

Origin
- Mill name: De Marssummermolen
- Mill location: R Veemansstrijte 18, 9034 HC Marsum
- Coordinates: 53.2125°N 5.7192°E
- Operator(s): Stichting Molens in Menaldumadeel
- Year built: 1903

Information
- Purpose: Drainage mill
- Type: Smock mill
- Storeys: Two-storey smock
- Base storeys: Single-storey base
- No. of sails: Four sails
- Type of sails: Patent sails
- Windshaft: Cast iron
- Winding: Tailpole and winch
- Type of pump: Archimedes' screws

De Marsummermolen English: The mill of Marssum is a smock mill in Marsum, Friesland, Netherlands which was built in 1903. The mill has been restored to working order and is used as a training mill. It is listed as a Rijksmonument, number 28624.

== History ==
De Marssummermolen was built in 1903 by millwright J H Westra of Franeker. The mill can drain the polder, or pump water into the polder, or pump water in a closed circuit. Restorations were undertaken in 1976, and 1992–94. It is used as a training mill (Dutch: lesmolen), and was the first mill in Friesland to be designated as such. A further restoration was undertaken in 2000. The mill is licensed as a venue for weddings.

== Description ==
De Marsummermolen is what the Dutch describe as a Grondzeiler. It is a two-storey smock mill on a single-storey base. There is no stage, the sails reaching almost to ground level. The mill is winded by tailpole and winch. The smock and cap are thatched. The sails are Patent sails. They have a span of 22.00 metres (72 ft 2 in). The sails are carried on a cast-iron windshaft. which was cast by De Muinck Keizer, Martenshoek, Groningen in 1903. The windshaft also carries the brake wheel which has 57 cogs. This drives the wallower (31 cogs) at the top of the upright shaft. At the bottom of the upright shaft there are two crown wheels' The upper crown wheel, which has 17 cogs drives an Archimedes' screw. The axle of the Archimedes' screw is 70 millimetres (3 in) diameter and 2.25 metres (7 ft 5 in) long. This screw is used to pump water into the polder. The lower crown wheel, which has 43 cogs, drives a gearwheel with 38 cogs on the axle of an Archimedes' screw, which is used to drain the polder. The axle of the screw is 60 centimetres (2 ft 0 in) diameter and 5.25 metres (17 ft 3 in) long. The screw is 1.75 metres (5 ft 9 in) diameter. It is inclined at 17°. Each revolution of the screw lifts 1,995 litres (439 imp gal) of water.

== Public access ==
De Marsummermolen is open to the public on Saturdays from 09:00 to 12:00, or by appointment.
