= Poptaslot =

Stins in Marsum, Netherlands

Coordinates: 53°12′35″N 5°43′45″E

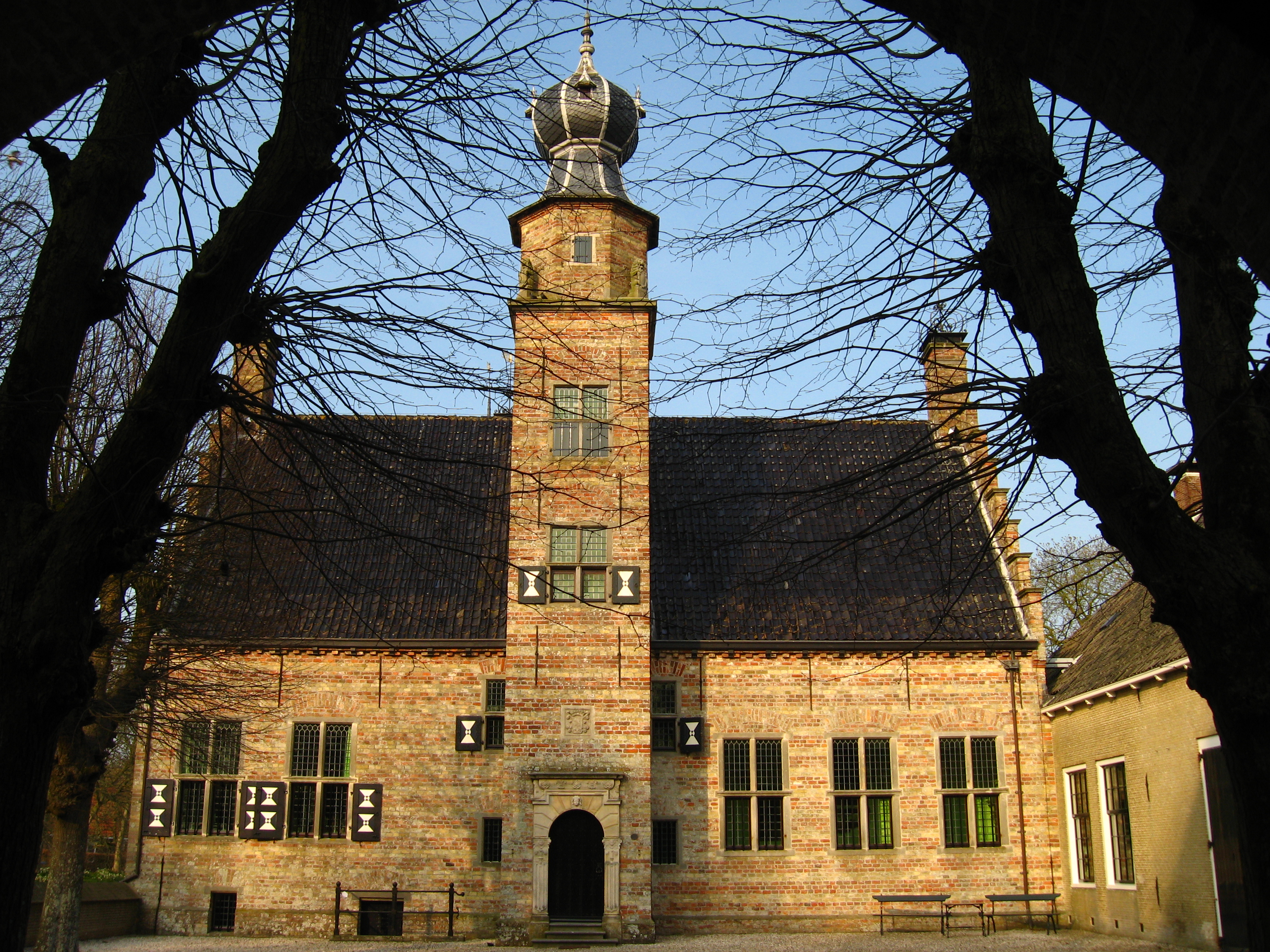
- Poptaslot

Poptaslot or Heringastate is a stins — a type of luxurious house often used by and/or built for the nobility of Frisia, many of which are built to look like castles (the term literally means "stone-house")—in the Dutch province of Friesland (Fryslân). It was founded somewhere between 1512 and 1525, probably by Sasker van Camstra. It was probably named Heringastate when it was founded, using his mother’s surname Heringa. Around 1631 it was significantly changed and modernised. Its last inhabitant, Doctor Henricus Popta, declared that his house should never be lived in again and should be preserved. Today slot guardians (Dutch: slotvoogden), of which four are currently active, still preserve the stins.

It is located in the village of Marsum, near the provincial capital of Friesland, Leeuwarden, and is listed as rijksmonument number 28623.

== See also ==
- List of stins in Friesland
