= Marsum =

Marsum Marssum
- Village
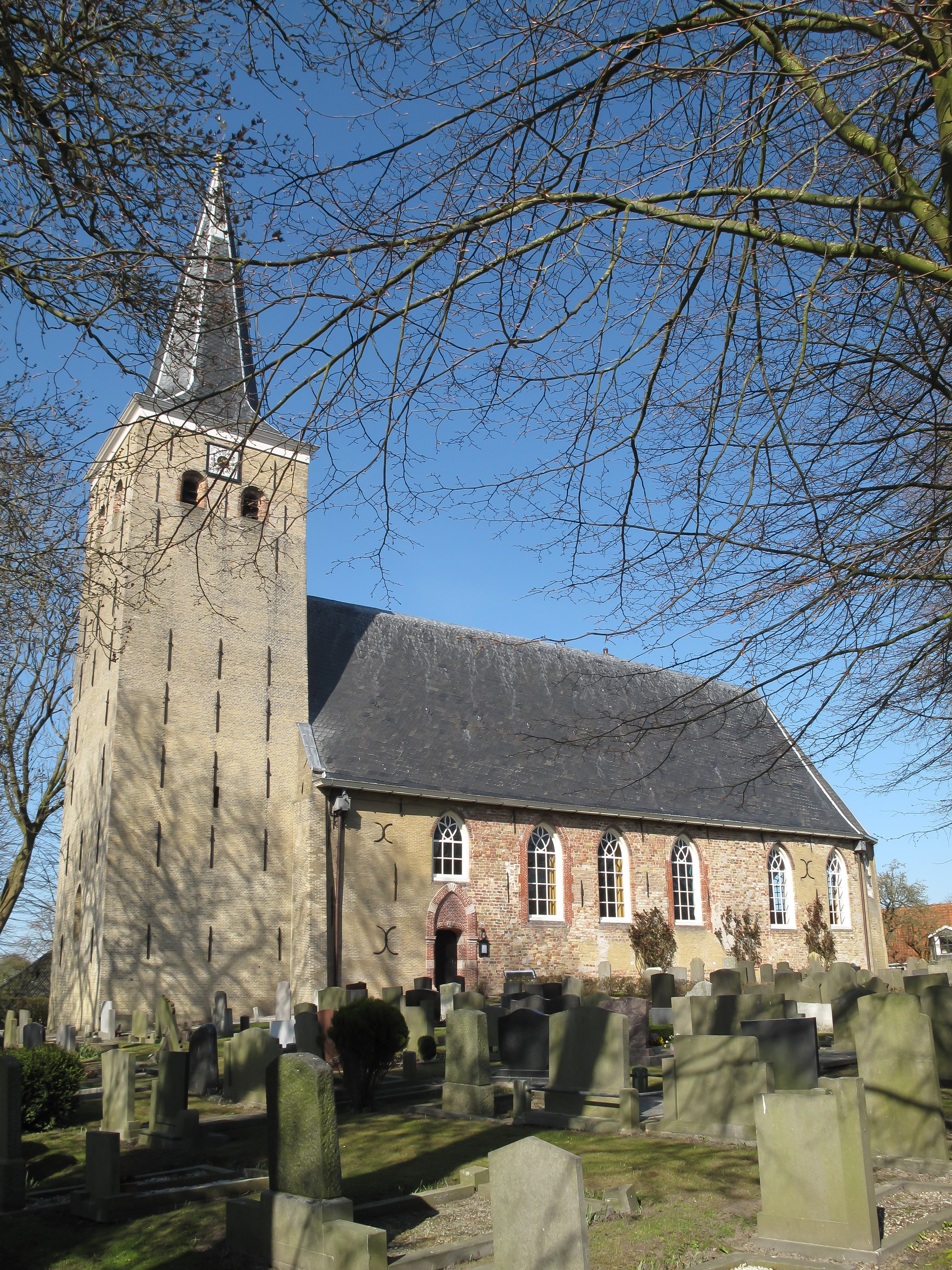
- St Pontianus church

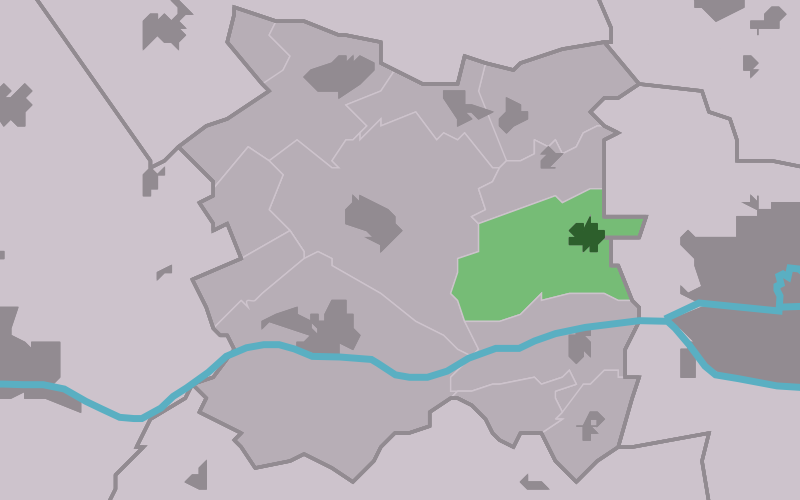
- Location in former Menameradiel municipality

- Location in the Netherlands Marsum (Netherlands)
- Coordinates: 53°12′42.8″N 5°43′40.8″E
- Country: Netherlands
- Province: Friesland
- Municipality: Waadhoeke

Area
  - Total: 7.38 km^{2} (2.85 sq mi)
- Elevation: 0.7 m (2.3 ft)

Population (2021)
  - Total: 1,055
  - Density: 143/km^{2} (370/sq mi)
- Time zone: UTC+1 (CET)
  - Summer (DST): UTC+2 (CEST)
- Postal code: 9034
- Dialing code: 058

Marsum or Marssum (Dutch pronunciation: [ˈmɑrsʏm]) is a village in Waadhoeke in the province of Friesland, the Netherlands. It had a population of around 1,052 in January 2017. Before 2018, the village was part of the Menameradiel municipality.

Every year a Marsumer of the year is chosen and awarded an award called the Gilded Shit Broom.

There are two windmills in Marsum, De Marssumermolen and Terpzigt.

== History ==
The village was first mentioned in 1344 as Mersum, and means "settlement on swampy land (marsh)". Marsum is a terp (artificial living hill) village from the start of our era with a radial structure. Around 1050, it became part of the Hoge dijk, a dike to protect against the Middelzee.

The Dutch Reformed church dates from the 12th century. In the 13th century, it was enlarged and a tower was added. The church was heightened in the 15th century.

The Poptaslot is a stins which was probably built around 1500. In 1631, it was owned by Tjalling van Eysinga, the grietman (mayor/judge) of Menaldumadeel who modified the building in a renaissance fantasy style. In 1906, the building was restored and returned to its medieval shape. Poptaslot is one of the few remaining estates with a near original 17th century interior, and is now a museum.

In 1840, the main road from Leeuwarden to Harlingen was built through Marsum. The same year, it was home to 588 people.

After World War II, it started to developed into a suburb of Leeuwarden. In the 1980s, parts of Marsum and Jelsum were scheduled to be demolished, because they were too close to Leeuwarden Air Base. 124 houses in both villages were listed for immediate demolition, and another 178 houses were listed for possible demolition. Large scale protests started, the buildings have remained and received improved sound isolation. Also the Minister of Defence was forced to cut back on the number of flights.

== Gallery ==
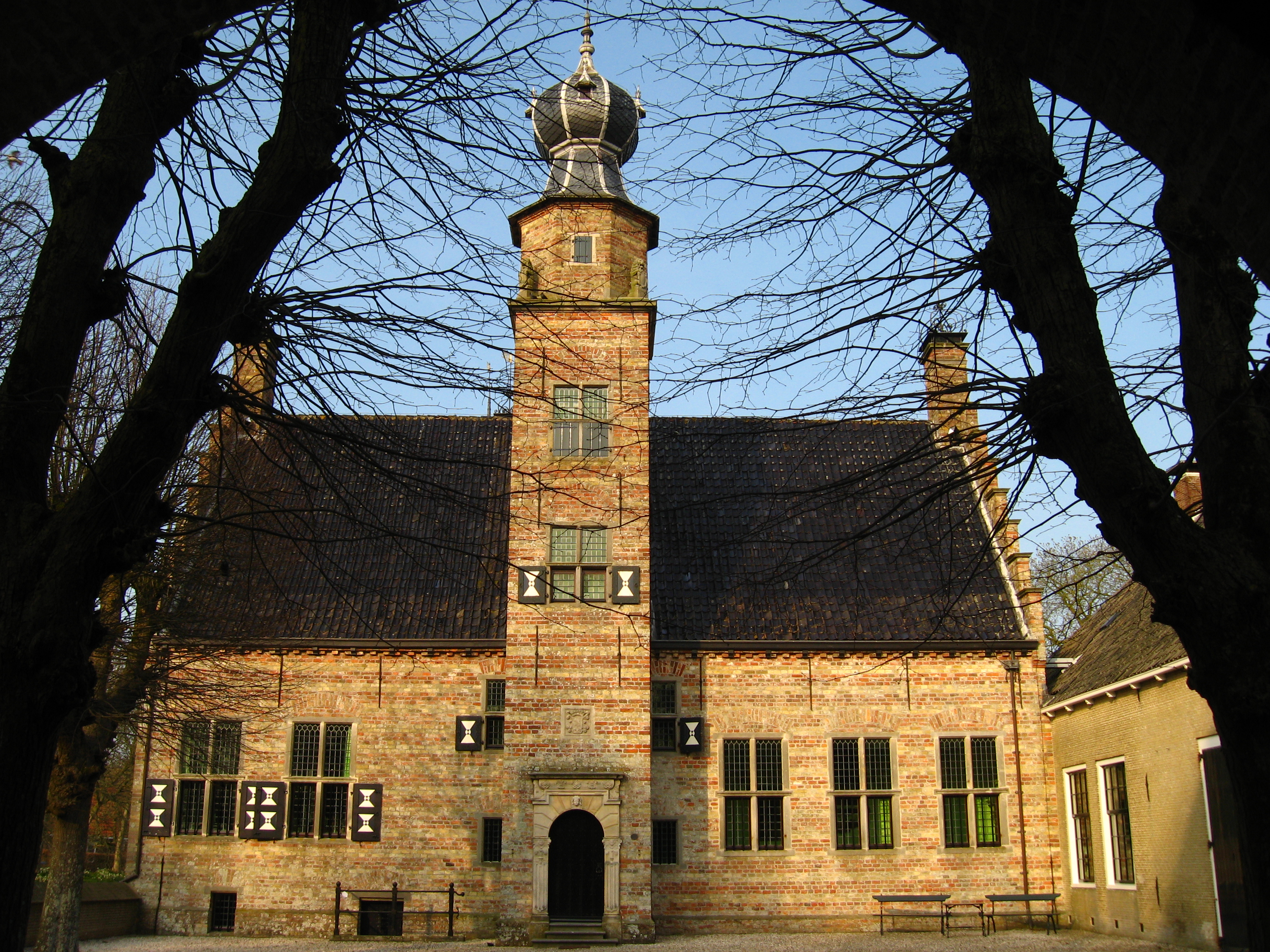
Popta Slot castle

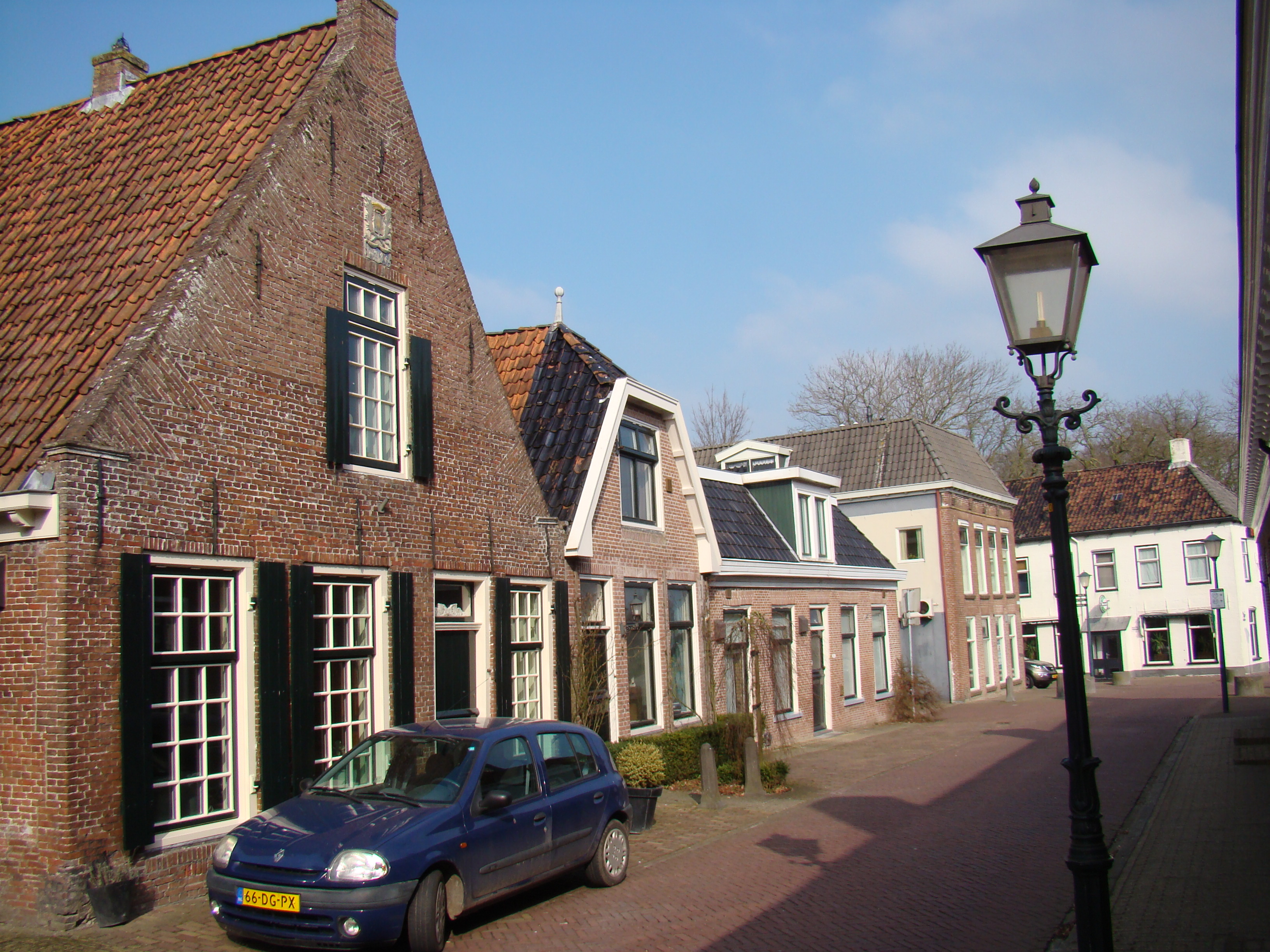
Street view

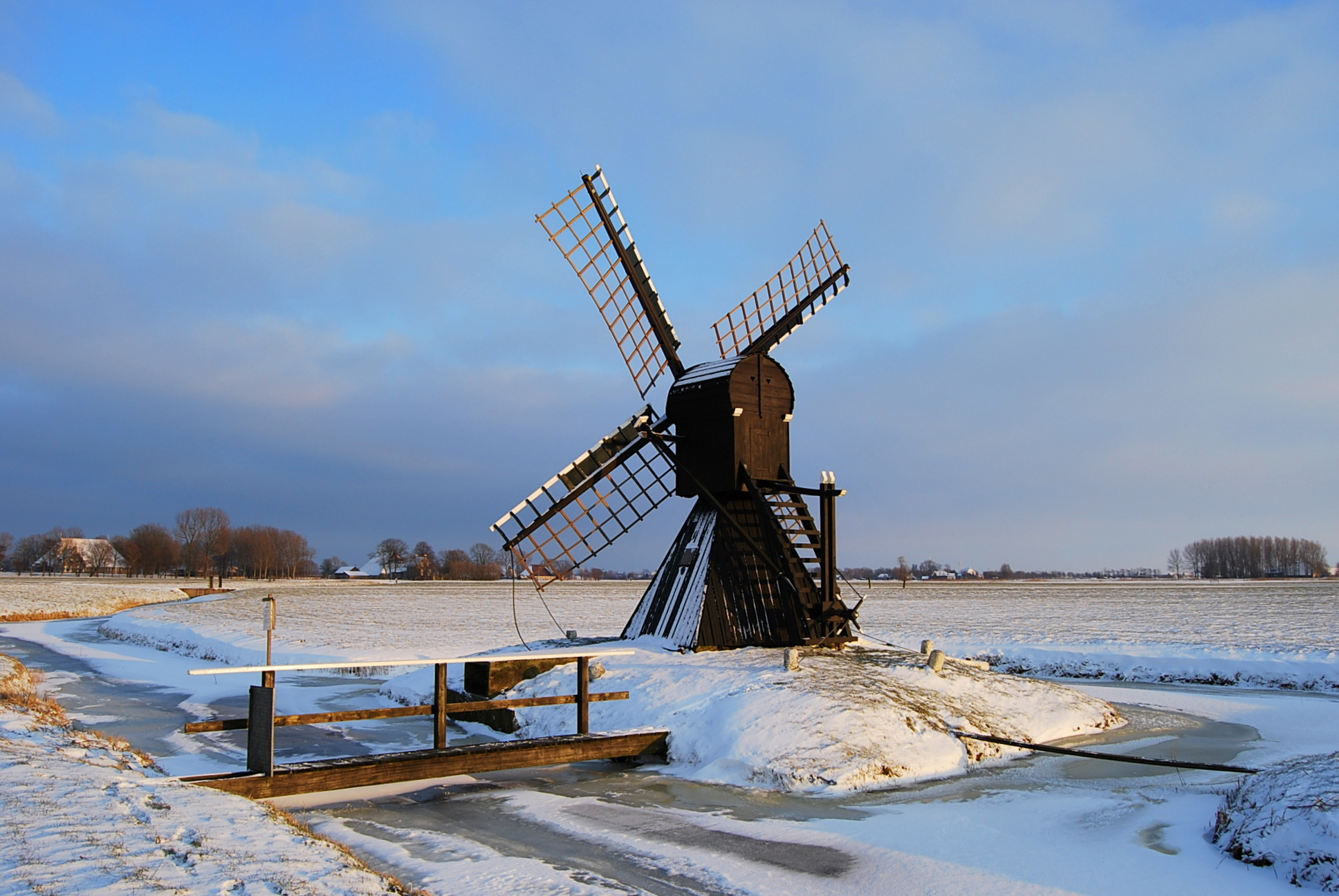
Terpzigt Mill

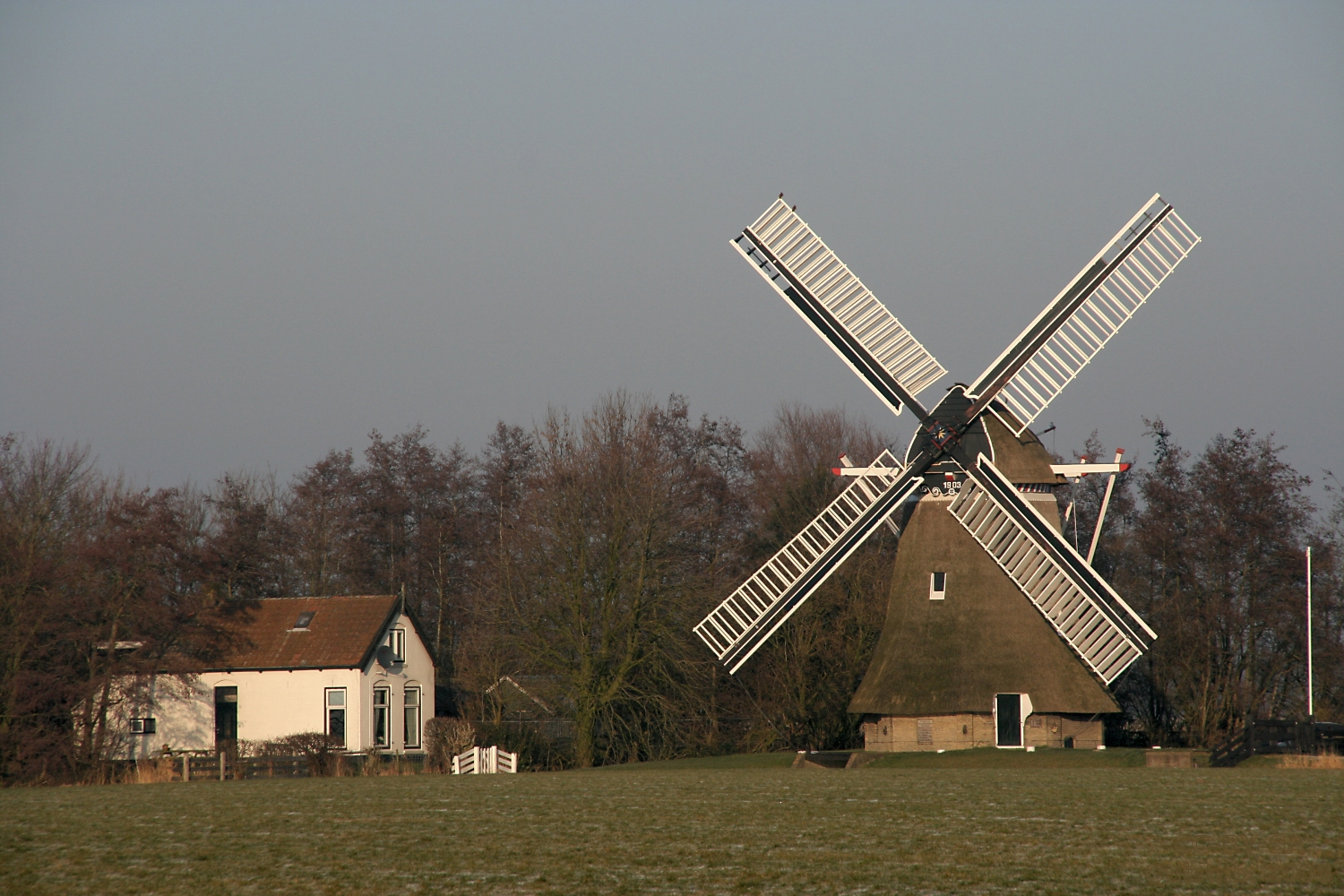
Marssum Mill
