= Súdwest-Fryslân =

Municipality of Friesland in the northern Netherlands

Southwest Friesland Súdwest-Fryslân (West Frisian)
- Municipality
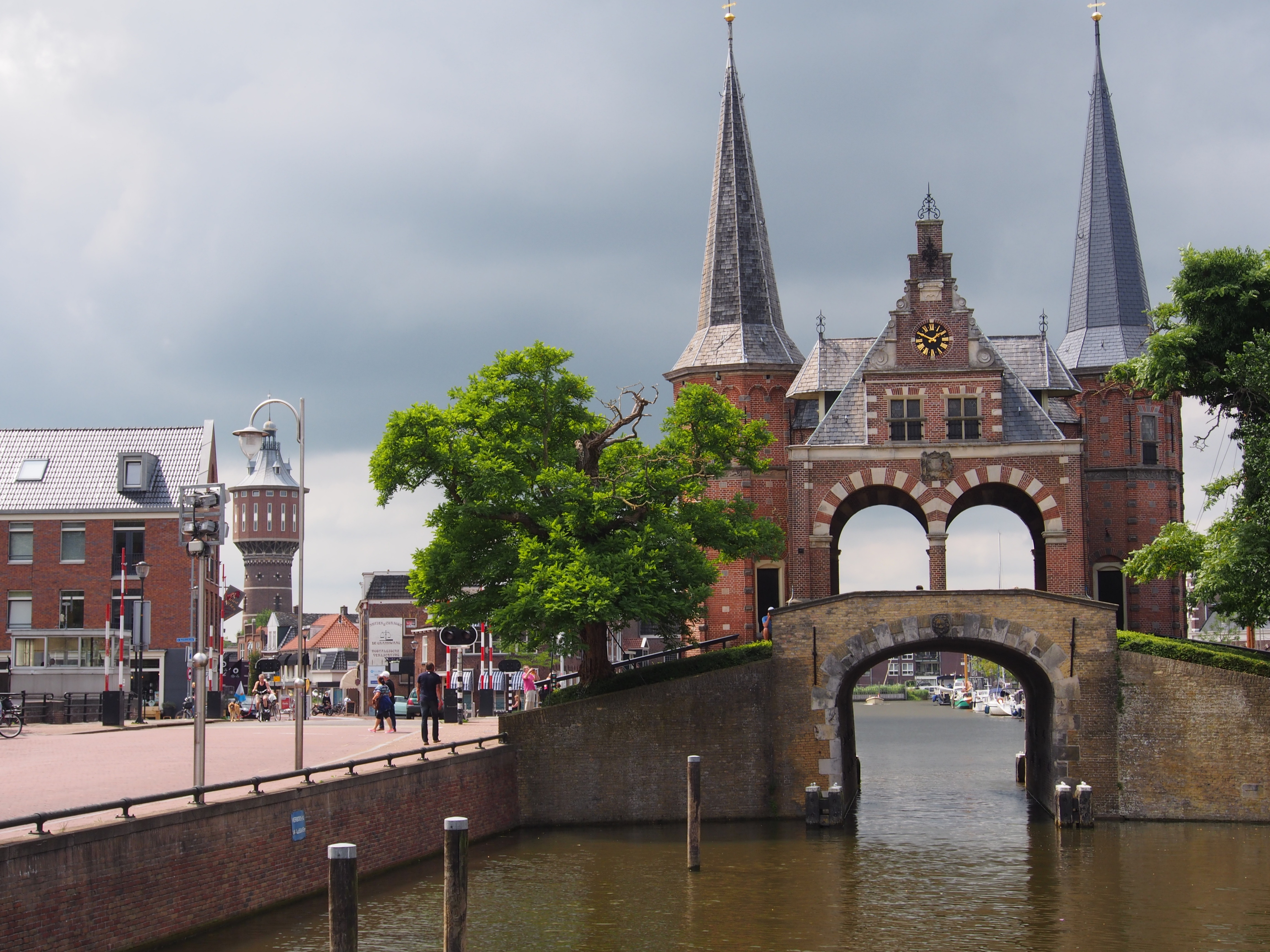
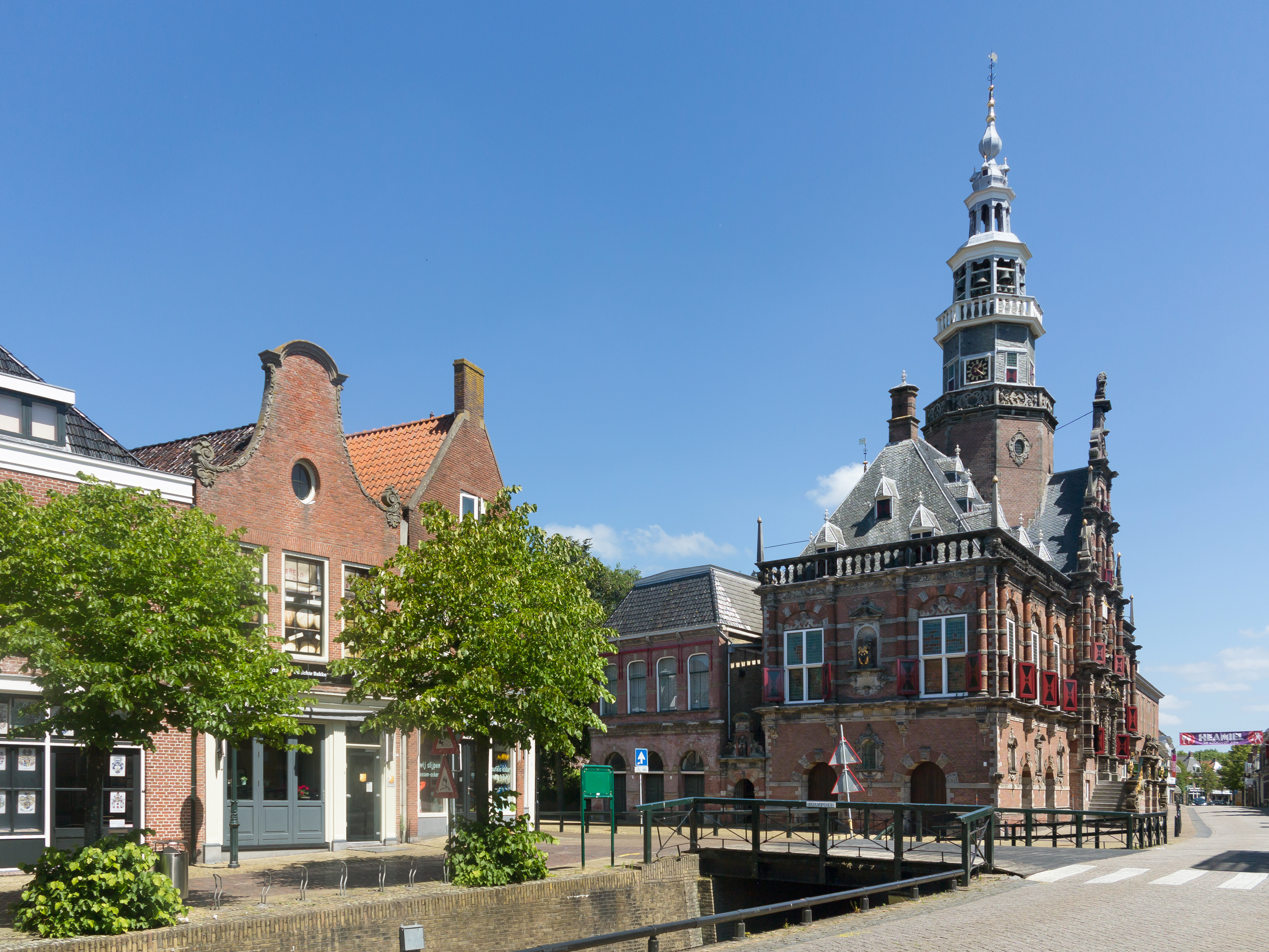
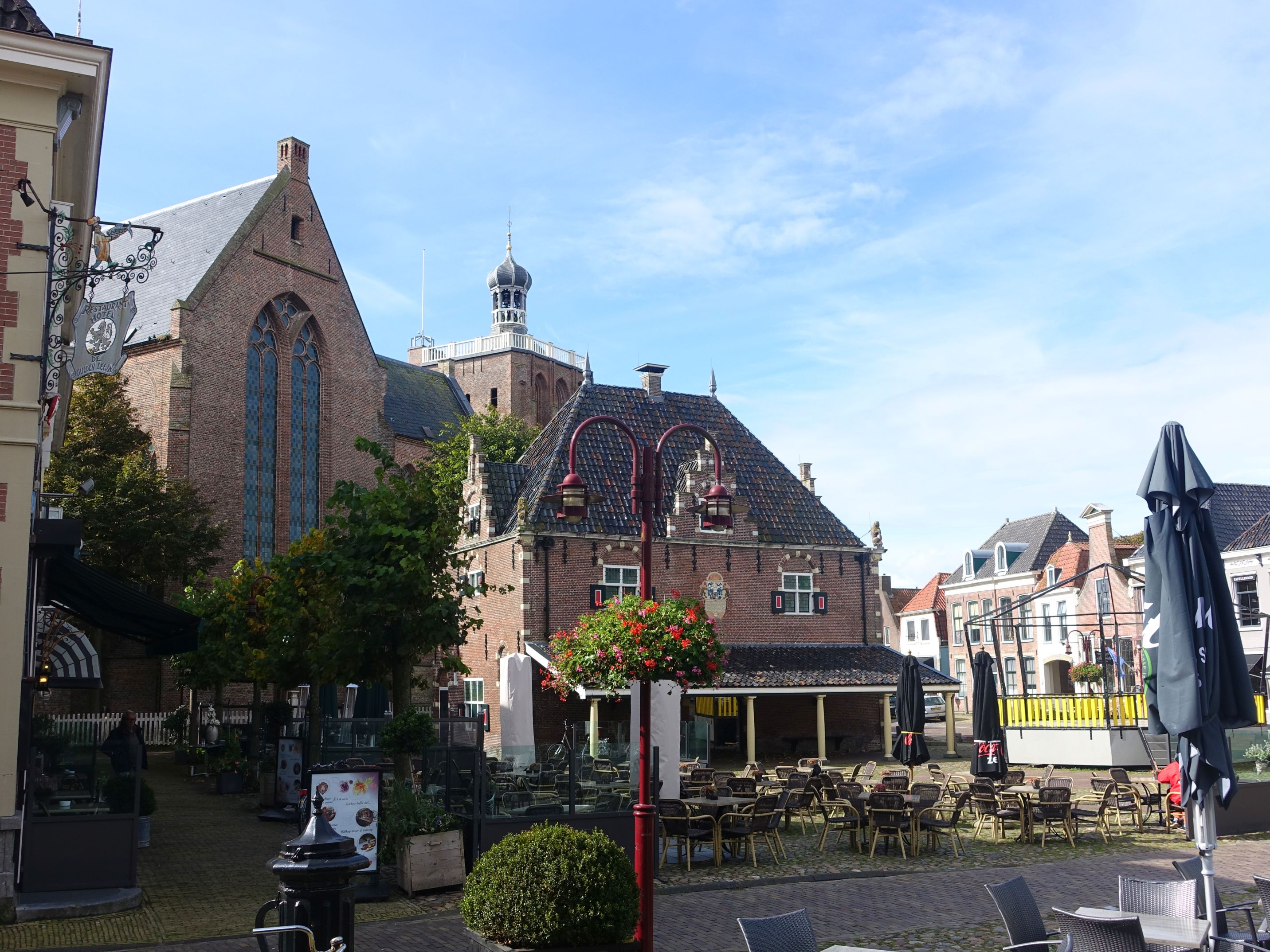
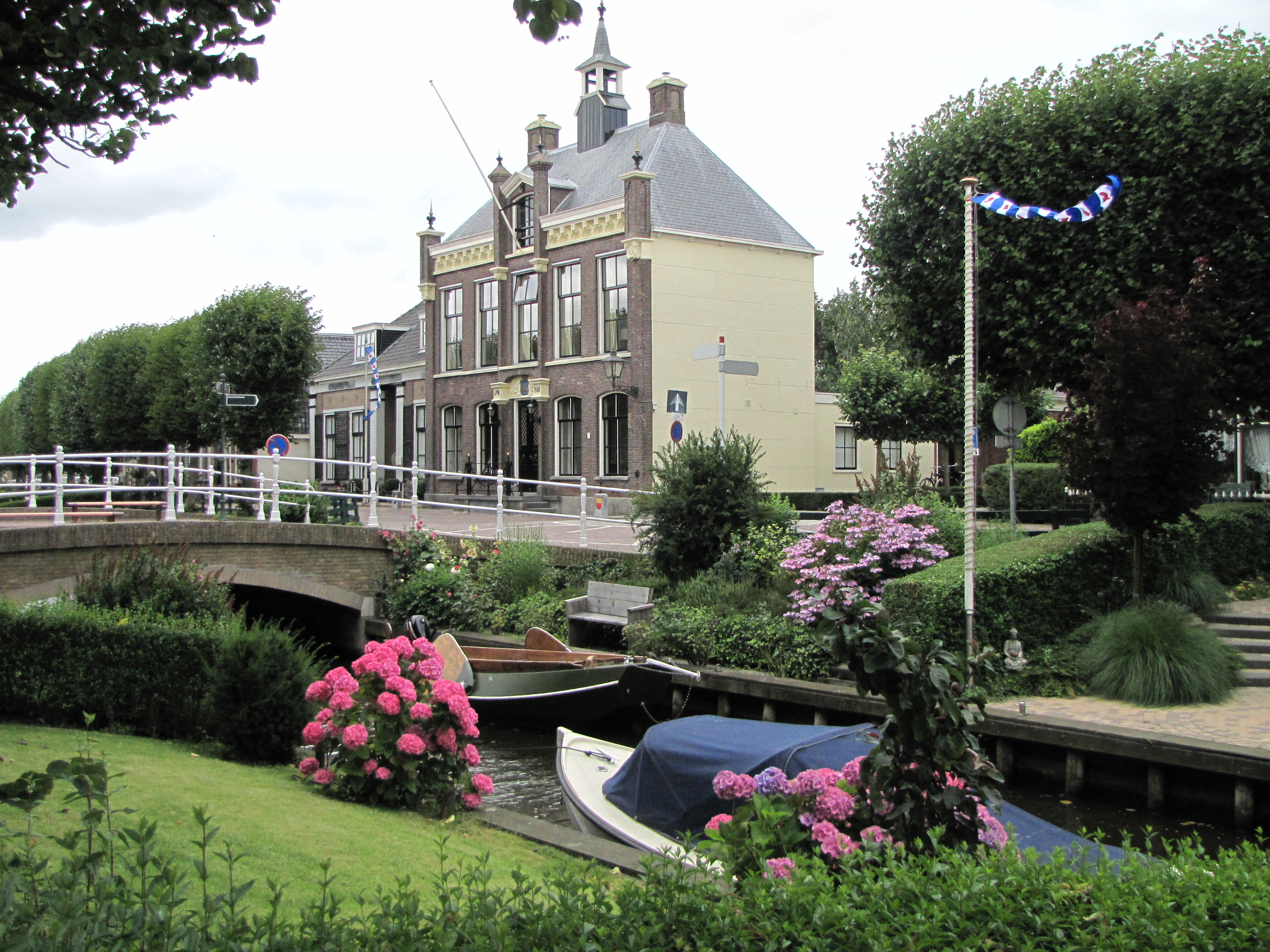
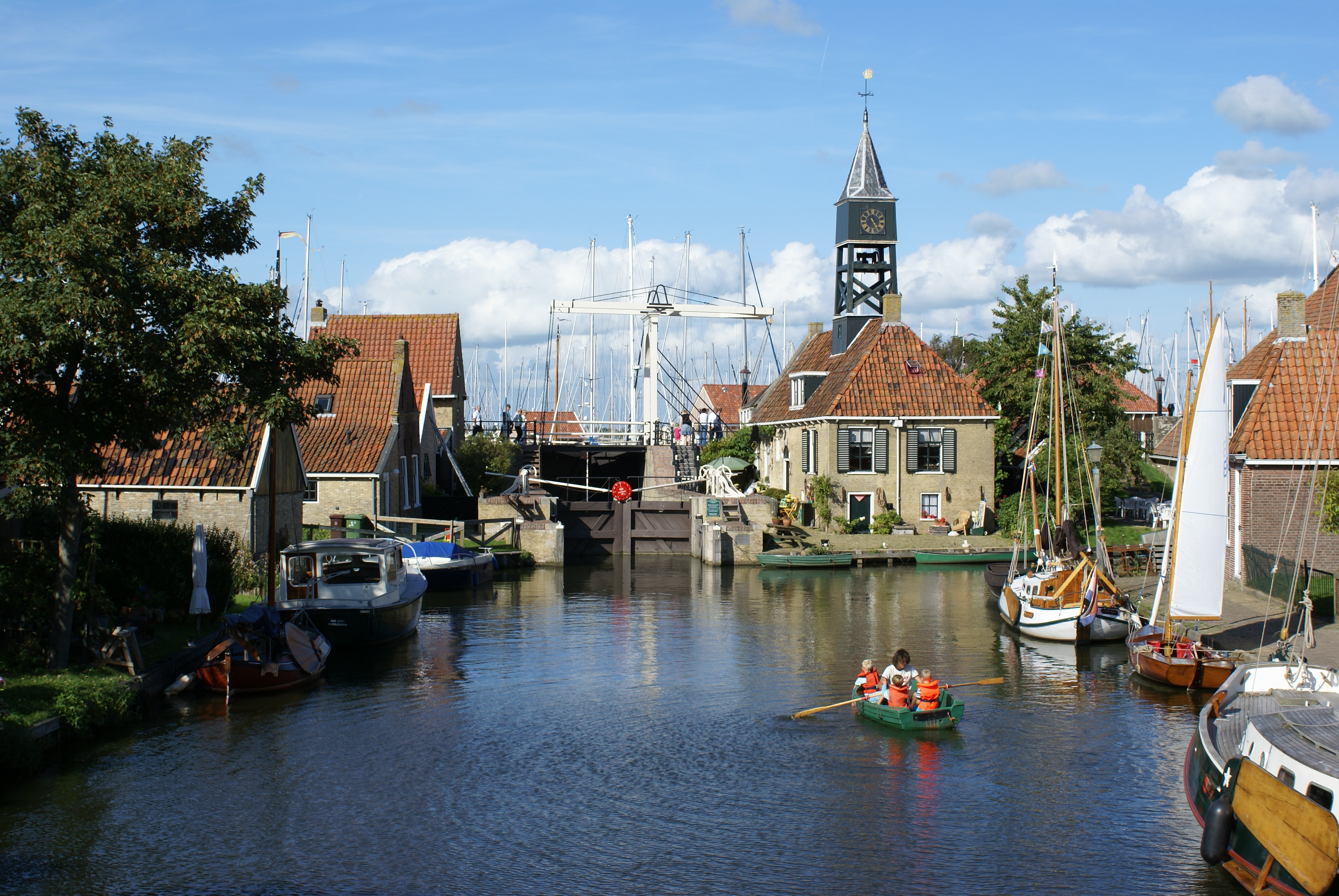
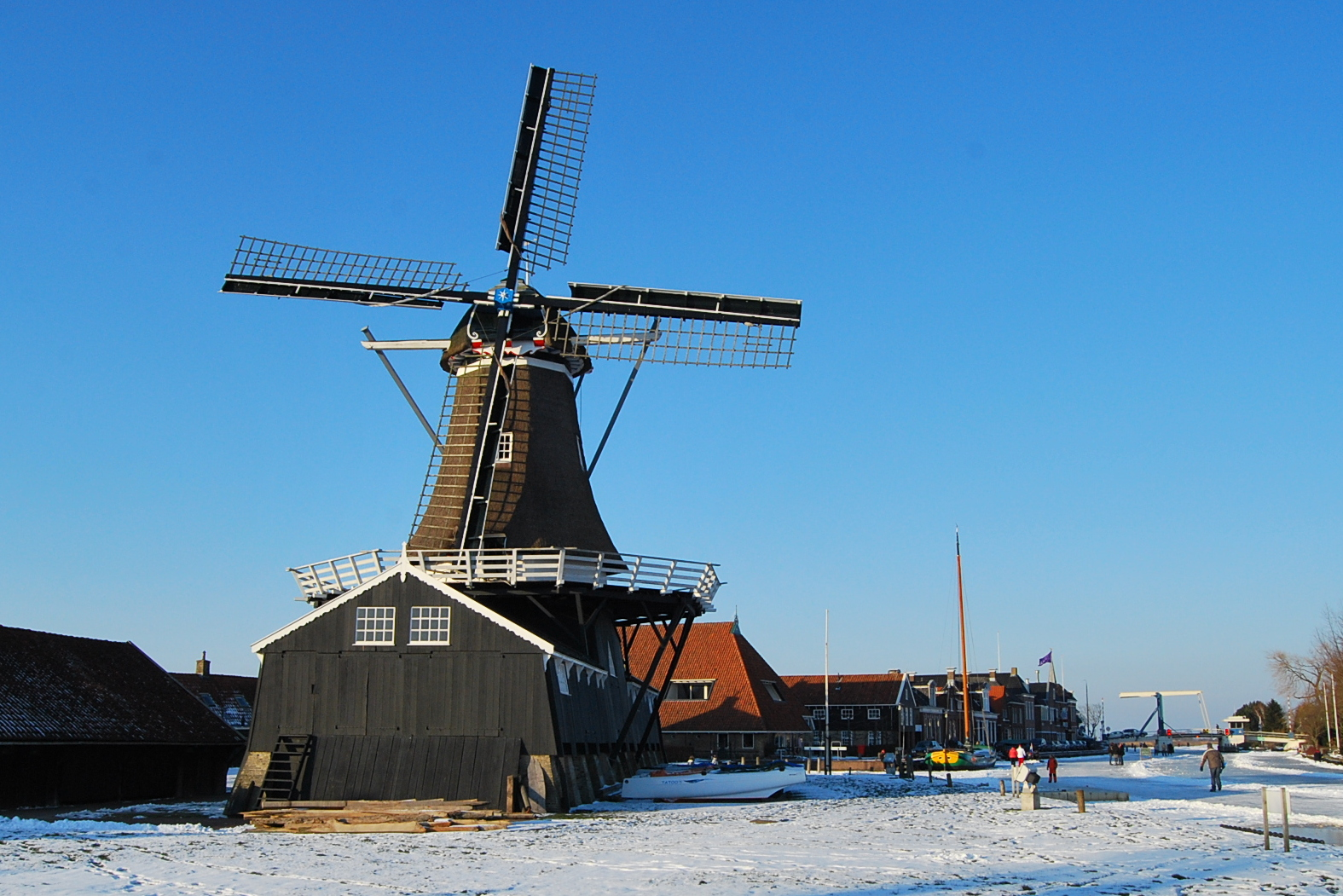
- Sneek Bolsward Workum IJlst Hindeloopen Woudsend

- Flag Coat of arms

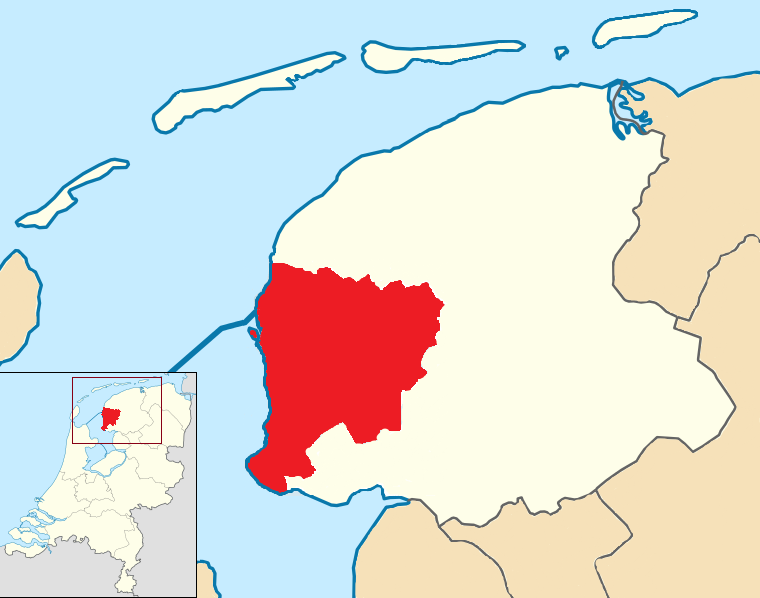
- Location in Friesland
- Coordinates: 53°2′N 5°40′E
- Country: Netherlands
- Province: Friesland
- Established: 1 January 2011

Government
  - Body: Municipal council
  - Mayor: Jannewietske de Vries (PvdA)

Area
  - Total: 907.87 km^{2} (350.53 sq mi)
  - Land: 523.01 km^{2} (201.94 sq mi)
  - Water: 384.86 km^{2} (148.60 sq mi)
- Elevation: 2 m (6.6 ft)

Population (January 2021)
  - Total: 89,999
  - Density: 172/km^{2} (450/sq mi)
- Time zone: UTC+01:00 (CET)
  - Summer (DST): UTC+02:00 (CEST)
- Postcode: Parts of 8000 range
- Area code: 0514, 0515, 0517
- Website: Sudwestfryslan.nl

Súdwest-Fryslân (West Frisian pronunciation: [ˈsytʋɛst ˈfrislɔ̃ːn]; lit. 'Southwest Friesland') is a municipality in the northern Netherlands, located in the province of Friesland. It had a population of 89,999 in January 2021. Sneek is the municipal seat. With a total area of 841.56 km^{2}, Southwest-Friesland is the largest municipality by area in the Netherlands.

== History ==
Southwest-Friesland was formed in 2011 from the old municipalities of Bolsward, Nijefurd, Sneek, Wûnseradiel and Wymbritseradiel. In 2014 it was enlarged by parts of the former municipality of Boarnsterhim. On 1 January 2018 it was enlarged by parts of former municipality of Littenseradiel.

== Geography ==
Map of Southwest-Friesland, 2023

The municipality is formed by several settlements, divided into towns and villages.

=== Towns ===
The towns located in Southwest-Friesland are Bolsward, Hindeloopen, IJlst, Sneek, Stavoren and Workum.

=== Villages ===
The villages located in Southwest-Friesland are Abbegea, Allingawier, Arum, Blauwhuis, Bozum, Breezanddijk, Britswerd, Burgwerd, Cornwerd, Dedgum, Easterein, Edens, Exmorra, Ferwoude, Folsgare, Gaast, Gaastmeer, Gauw, Goënga, Greonterp, Hartwerd, Heeg, Hemelum, Hennaard, Hichtum, Hidaard, Hieslum, Hommerts, Idsegahuizum, Idzega, Indijk, It Heidenskip, Itens, Jutrijp, Kimswerd, Kornwerderzand, Koudum, Koufurderrige, Kubaard, Laaxum, Loënga, Lollum, Longerhouw, Lutkewierum, Makkum, Molkwerum, Nijhuizum, Nijland, Offingawier, Oosterend, Oosterwierum, Oosthem, Oppenhuizen, Oudega, Parrega, Piaam, Pingjum, Poppenwier, Raerd, Rien, Roodhuis, Sandfirden, Scharl, Scharnegoutum, Schettens, Schraard, Sibrandabuorren, Smallebrugge, Tirns, Tjalhuizum, Tjerkwerd, Uitwellingerga, Waaxens, Warns, Westhem, Wieuwerd, Witmarsum, Wolsum, Wommels, Wons, Woudsend, Ypecolsga, Ysbrechtum and Zurich.

=== Hamlets ===
The hamlets located in Southwest-Friesland are Aaksens, Abbegaasterketting, Abbegaasterrige, Andelahuizen, Angterp, Annabuorren, Arkum, Atzeburen, Baarderbuorren, Baburen, Barnsterbuorren, Barsum, Bessens, Bittens, Bloemkamp, Bonjeterp, Bootland, Bovenburen, De Band, De Bieren, De Blokken, De Burd, De Hel, De Grits, De Kat, De Kliuw, De Nes, De Pôle, De Weeren, De Wieren, Dijksterburen, Doniaburen, Doniawier, Draaisterhuzen, Easthim, Eemswoude, Engwier, Exmorrazijl, Feytebuorren, Fiifhûs, Fiskersbuorren, Flansum, Galamadammen, Goëngamieden, Gooium, Grauwe Kat, Greate Wierrum, Grote Wiske, Harkezijl, Hayum, Hemert, Hiddum, Hidaardersyl, Hoekens, Hornsterburen, Houw, Idserdaburen, Ingwert, It Fliet, Jeth, Jonkershuizen, Jousterp, Jouswerd, Kampen, Klaeiterp, Kleine Wiske, Knossens, Kooihuizen, Koudehuizum, Kromwâl, Laad en Zaad, Lippenwâlde, Littenserbuorren, Lytse Gaastmar, Lytshuzen, Makkum, Boazum, Meilahuzen, Monsamabuorren, Nijbuorren, Nijekleaster, Nijezijl, Osingahuizen, Ottenburen, Pikesyl, Rea Skuorre, Remswerd, Rytseterp, Sandfirderrijp, Scharneburen, Sieswerd, Sjungadijk, Skrok, Sotterum, Spears, Spreeuwenstein, Spyk, Strand, Swaenwert, Swarte Beien, Trijehuzen, Tsjerkebuorren, Vierhuizen, Viersprong, Wolsumerketting, Wonneburen and Yndyk.

== Politics ==
Jannewietske de Vries became mayor of Southwest-Friesland in 2018. A member of the Dutch Labour Party (PvdA), she chairs the municipality's Board of Mayor and Aldermen.

== Notable people ==
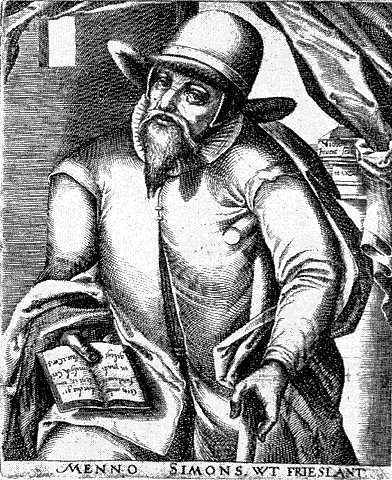
Menno Simons, 1610

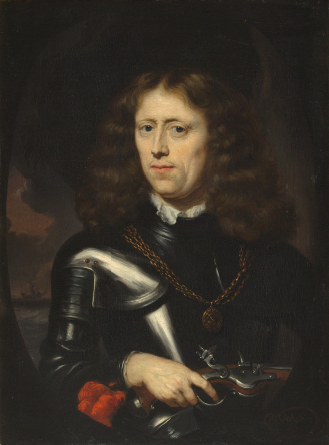
Jacob Binckes

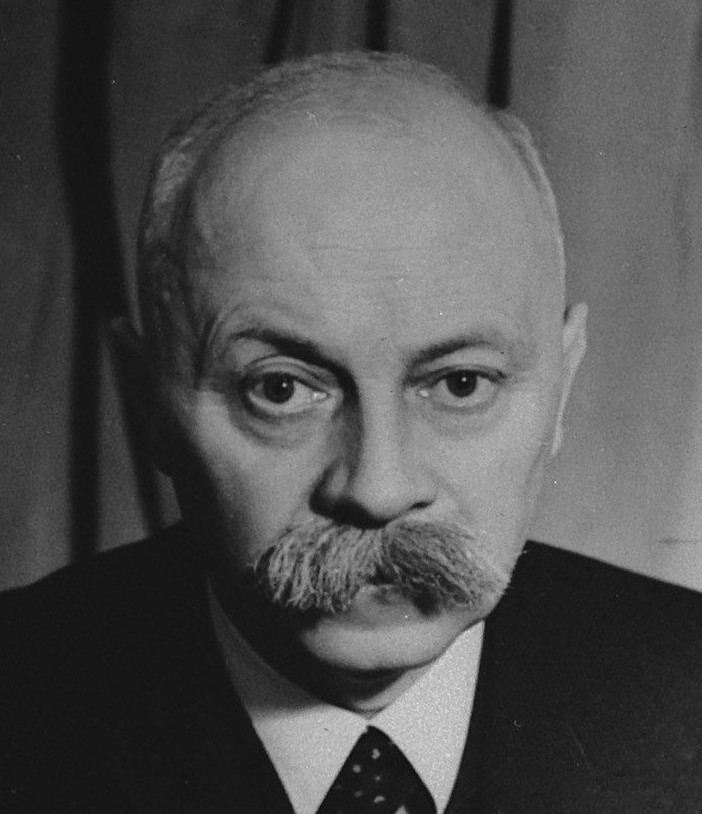
Pieter Sjoerds Gerbrandy, 1941

- Pier Gerlofs Donia (ca.1480 in Kimswerd – 1520) a Frisian rebel leader and pirate
- Menno Simons (1496 in Witmarsum – 1561) a Roman Catholic priest, an influential Anabaptist religious leader, his followers became known as Mennonites
- brothers Boetius à Bolswert (ca.1585 in Bolsward – 1633) and Schelte a Bolswert (1586 in Bolsward – 1659) were copper-plate engravers
- Gysbert Japiks (1603 in Bolsward – 1666) a West Frisian writer, poet, schoolmaster and cantor
- Allart Pieter van Jongestall (1612 in Stavoren – 1676) a jurist and diplomat
- Jacob Potma (ca.1630 in Workum – 1704) a Dutch Golden Age painter
- Jacob Binckes (1637 in Koudum – 1677) a Dutch commodore
- Lambert Bos (1670 in Workum – 1717) a scholar and critic
- Eelco Alta (1723 in Makkum – 1798) a Frisian clergyman, theologian and veterinarian
- Cynthia Lenige (1755 in Makkum – 1780) a Frisian poet
- Douwe de Hoop (1800 in Workum – 1830) a painter and draftsman
- Sgnt James H. Burbank (1838 in Stavoren – 1911) a soldier, awarded the US Medal of Honor
- Hobbe Smith (1862 in Witmarsum – 1942) a painter in the Post-Impressionist style
- B.D. Dykstra (1871 in Pingjum – 1955) a Dutch American pastor, educator and poet
- Willem de Sitter (1872 in Sneek – 1934) a mathematician, physicist and astronomer
- Pieter Sjoerds Gerbrandy (1885 in Goënga – 1961) a politician and Prime Minister of the Netherlands from 1940 to 1945
- Hilbrand Boschma (1893 in Ysbrechtum – 1976) a zoologist and director of the Rijksmuseum of Natural History
- Hans Wiegel (1941 – 2025) a politician and businessman, lived in Oudega
- Klaas Rusticus (born 1942 in Sneek) a author and TV and film director
- Hillie Molenaar (born 1945 in Sneek) a documentary film director
- Jan de Haan (born 1951 in Warns) a contemporary composer, conductor and musician
- Liuwe Tamminga (1953 in Hemelum – 2021) an organist and harpsichordist, played Italian Early Music
- Pauline Krikke (born 1961 in Sneek) a politician and Mayor of The Hague 2017/2019

=== Sport ===
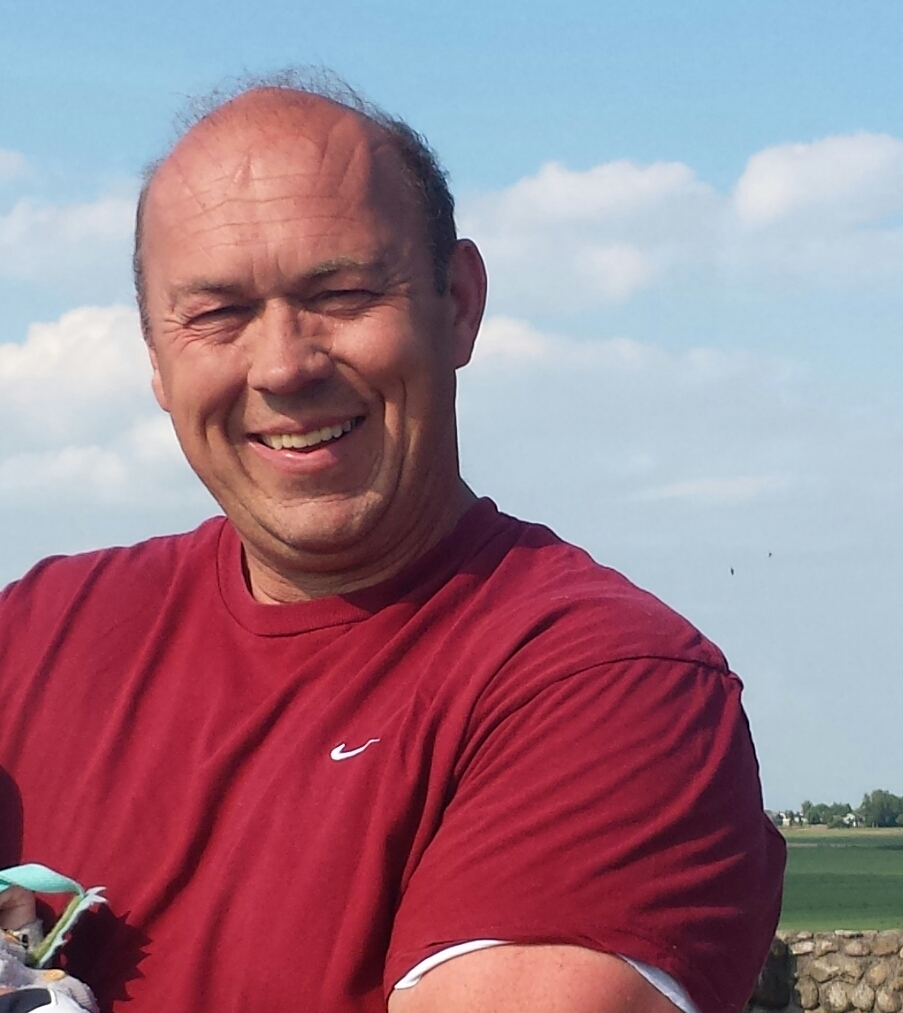
Wout Zijlstra

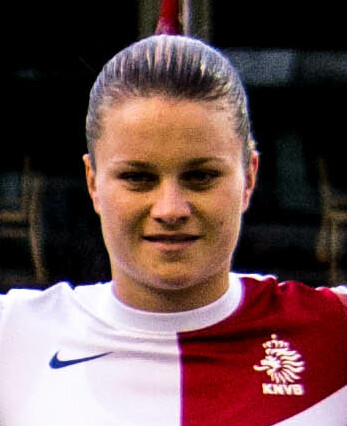
Sherida Spitse, 2014

- Pim Mulier (1865 in Witmarsum – 1954) introduced tennis, athletics, cricket and hockey to the Netherlands
- Jan Ankerman (1906 in Wommels – 1942) a Dutch field hockey player who competed in the 1928 Summer Olympics
- Wout Zijlstra (born 1964 in Wolsum) a former strongman and Highland Games athlete
- twin brothers Ben & Jan Kouwenhoven (born 1965 in Sneek) sailors, who competed at the 1992 Summer Olympics
- Ronald Zoodsma (born 1966 in Sneek) a retired volleyball player, team silver medallist at the 1992 Summer Olympics
- brothers Gerhard (1967 in Sneek – 2006) & Willem Potma (born 1969 in Sneek) sailors, who competed at the 1992 and 1996 Summer Olympics
- Pieter Huistra (born 1967 in Goënga) a Dutch former football winger with 394 club caps
- Olof van der Meulen (born 1968 in Sneek) a retired volleyball player and team silver and gold medallist at the 1992 and 1996 Summer Olympics
- Rick Hofstra (born 1977 in Sneek) a professional darts player
- Sandor van der Heide (born 1978 in Ysbrechtum) a football manager and former player with 282 club caps
- Loes Geurts (born 1986 in Wûnseradiel) a Dutch football goalkeeper, over 100 caps for the Netherlands women's national football team
- Sherida Spitse (born 1990 in Sneek) a Dutch football midfielder with over 250 club caps and 175 international caps
- Nyck de Vries (born 1995 in Sneek) is a Dutch Formula E racing driver
- Liesette Bruinsma (born 2000) a Dutch Paralympic swimmer, lives in Wommels
