= Abbegaasterketting =

Abbegaasterketting Abbegeasterketting (West Frisian)
- Hamlet
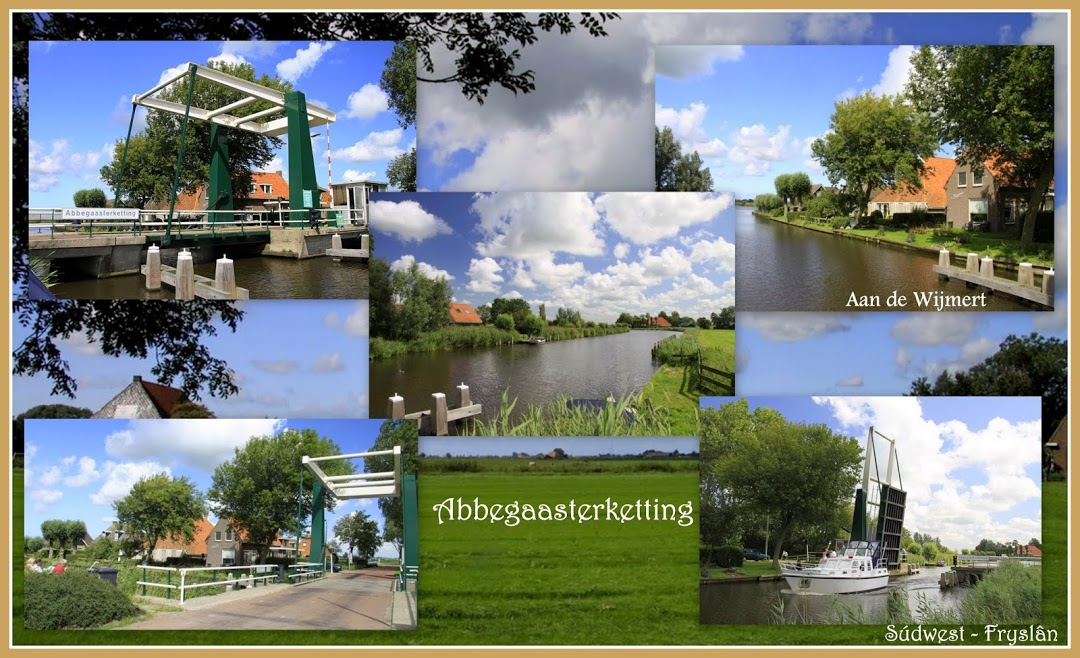
- Postcard of Abbegaasterketting

- Location in the province of Friesland in the Netherlands Abbegaasterketting (Netherlands)
- Coordinates: 53.02515°N 5.56570°E
- Country: Netherlands
- Province: Friesland
- Municipality: Súdwest-Fryslân
- Village: Abbega
- Elevation: 0 m (0 ft)

Population
  - Total: c. 40
- Time zone: UTC+1 (CET)
  - Summer (DST): UTC+2 (CEST)
- Postcode: 8617
- Area code: 0515

Abbegaasterketting (Dutch: [ˌɑbəˌɣaːstərˈkɛtɪŋ]; West Frisian: Abbegeasterketting or Abbegeaster Ketting) is a hamlet in the Dutch municipality of Súdwest-Fryslân in Friesland. The hamlet is located on the Wijmerts, northwest of Abbega, of which the settlement is a part administratively.

Abbegaasterketting originated from a ferry service with tolls across the Wijmerts. The ferry operator's building was first attested as the Abbegaster Ketting Huys in 1718. Therefore, the hamlet's name is a compound of Abbegaaster ('from or of Abbega') and ketting ('chain'). The chain hereby refers to the chain that was drawn across the Wijmerts as part of the toll post.
