= Idzega =

Idzega Idzegea
- Village
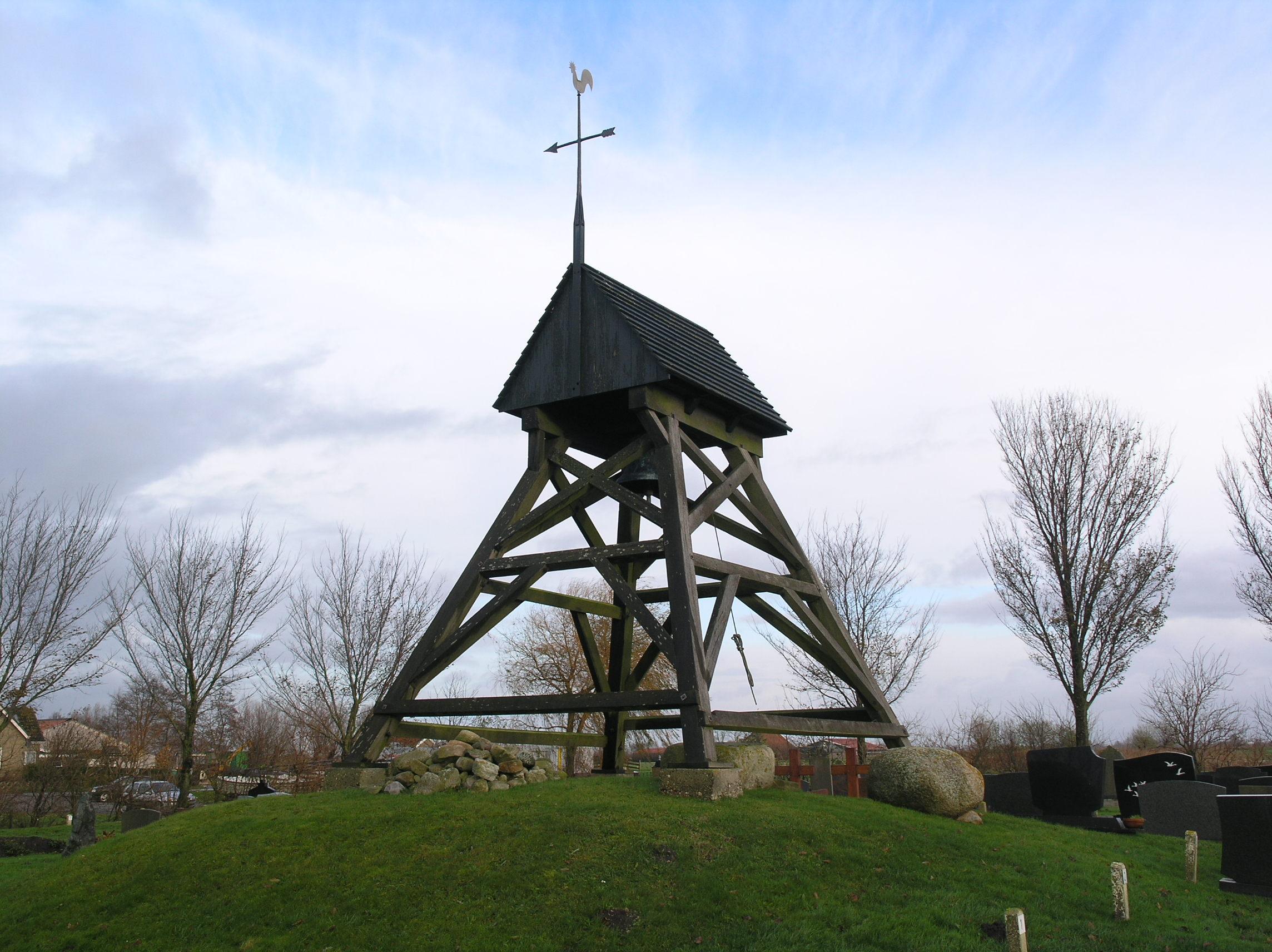
- Idzega belfry

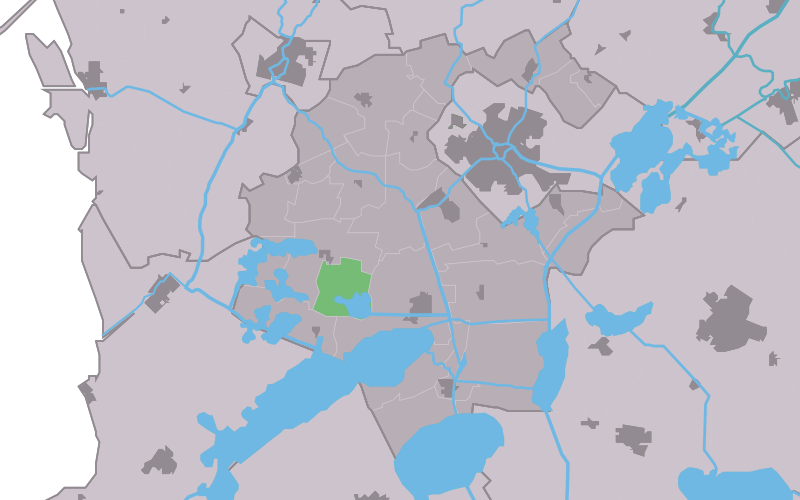
- Location in the former Wymbritseradiel municipality

- Location in the Netherlands Idzega (Netherlands)
- Country: Netherlands
- Province: Friesland
- Municipality: Súdwest-Fryslân

Area
  - Total: 5.10 km^{2} (1.97 sq mi)
- Elevation: −0.6 m (−2.0 ft)

Population (2021)
  - Total: 30
  - Density: 5.9/km^{2} (15/sq mi)
- Time zone: UTC+1 (CET)
  - Summer (DST): UTC+2 (CEST)
- Postal code: 8612
- Dialing code: 0515

Idzega (West Frisian: Idzegea) is a small village in Súdwest-Fryslân municipality in the province Friesland of the Netherlands. It had a population of around 30 in January 2017.

== History ==
The village was first mentioned in 1245 as Edeswald, and means "settlement of Iddo or Ede (person)". Idzega is an agricultural community from the Middle Ages, and used to surrounded by lakes and pools. Nowadays, the village is located on a dead-end road next to the Idzegaasterpoel.

The bell tower was built in 1826. Idzega was home to 149 people in 1840. Before 2011, the village was part of the Wymbritseradiel municipality.
