= Offingawier =

Offingawier Offenwier
- Village in the municipality of Súdwest-Fryslân
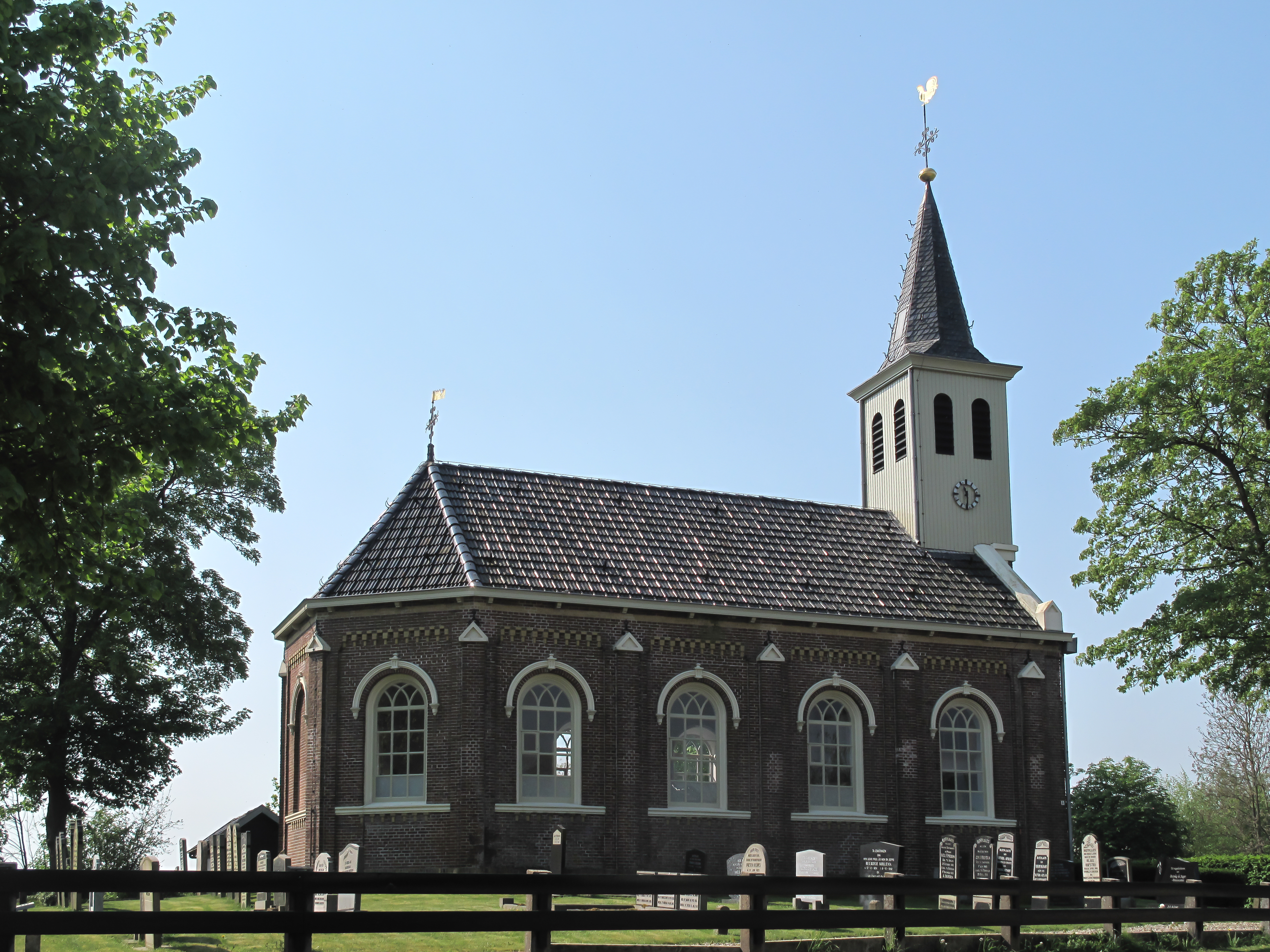
- Offingawier Church

- Coat of arms

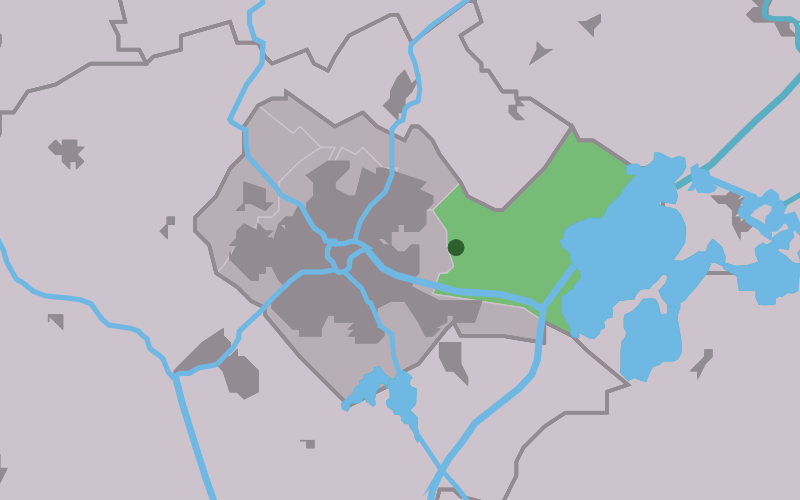
- Location in the former Sneek municipality

- Location in the Netherlands Offingawier (Netherlands)
- Country: Netherlands
- Province: Friesland
- Municipality: Súdwest-Fryslân

Area
  - Total: 10.05 km^{2} (3.88 sq mi)
- Elevation: −0.2 m (−0.66 ft)

Population (2021)
  - Total: 245
  - Density: 24.4/km^{2} (63.1/sq mi)
- Time zone: UTC+1 (CET)
  - Summer (DST): UTC+2 (CEST)
- Postal code: 8626
- Dialing code: 0515

Offingawier (West Frisian: Offenwier) is a village in the municipality of Súdwest-Fryslân, in the Dutch province of Friesland. Offingawier is located east of the city of Sneek, primarily along the Fiifgeawei. This road is named after the Sneker Vijfga, a cooperative association with the villages of Gauw, Goënga, Loënga, and Scharnegoutum. Offingawier is a linear village in the Lege Geaen region.

In 2023, the village had 240 inhabitants, with a rural area that runs along a large part of the western shore of Lake Sneek. Various canals run through this area, such as the Kipvaart.

== History ==
The village originated on a terp and developed over the centuries from two small cores. From the 19th century onwards, these two cores merged into a linear village. In the second half of the twentieth century, a recreational village and lake developed there on the side of the Snitsermar (Lake Sneek).

The village was first mentioned in the 13th century as Vffenwere, and means "terp of the people of Offa (person)".

The Dutch Reformed church was built in 1882, but contains elements from its 1335 predecessor.

Until 1984, Offingawier was located in the former municipality of Wymbritseradeel, and subsequently, until 2011, within the municipality of Sneek. In 2011 it became part of the new municipality of Súdwest-Fryslân.
