= Oosthem =

Oosthem Easthim
- Village
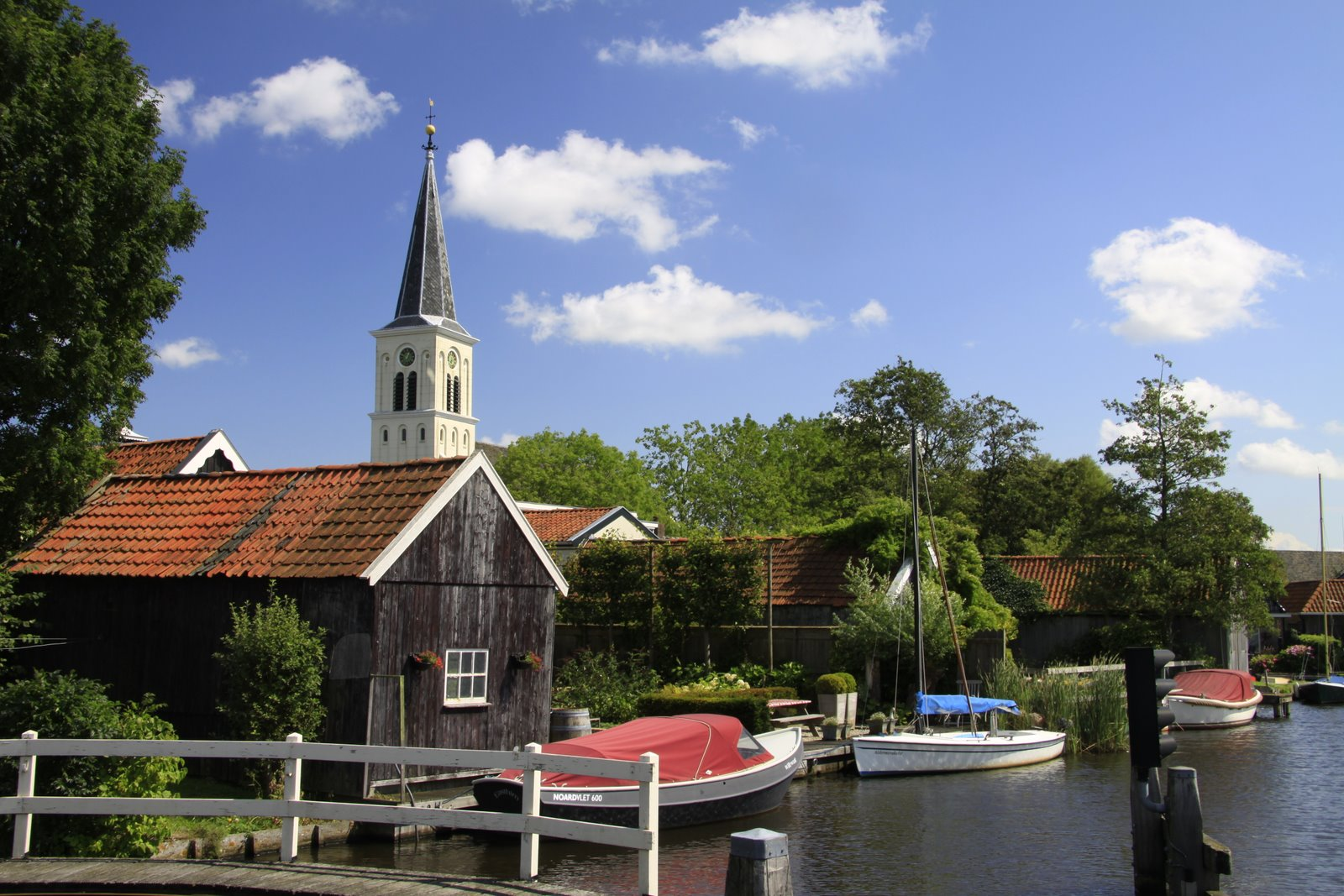

- Coat of arms

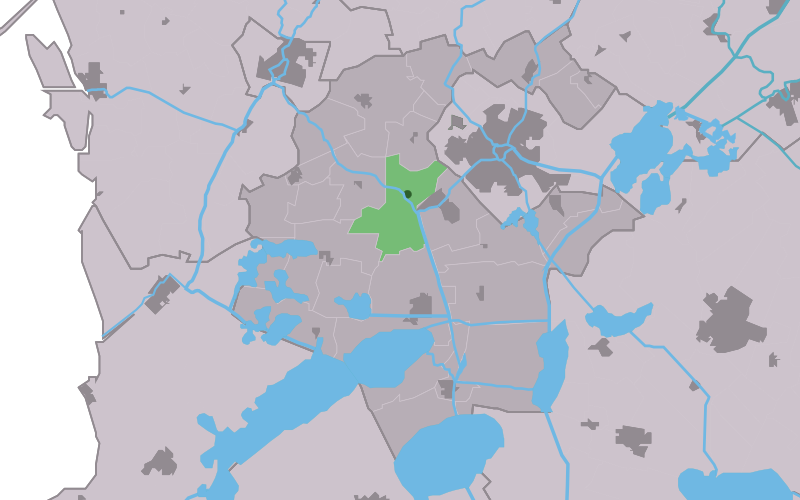
- Location in the former Wymbritseradiel municipality

- Location in the Netherlands Oosthem (Netherlands)
- Country: Netherlands
- Province: Friesland
- Municipality: Súdwest-Fryslân

Area
  - Total: 8.39 km^{2} (3.24 sq mi)
- Elevation: −0.5 m (−1.6 ft)

Population (2021)
  - Total: 455
  - Density: 54.2/km^{2} (140/sq mi)
- Time zone: UTC+1 (CET)
  - Summer (DST): UTC+2 (CEST)
- Postal code: 8618
- Dialing code: 0515

Oosthem (West Frisian: Easthim) is a village in Súdwest-Fryslân in the province of Friesland, the Netherlands. It had a population of around 420 in January 2017.

== History ==
The village was first mentioned in 1453 as Aesthem. The etymology is unclear. Oosthem is a terp (artificial living hill) village near the former Middelzee which is located to north of IJlst.

The Dutch Reformed church was built in 1860 in neoclassical style as a replacement of its medieval predecessor.

Oosthem was home to 180 people in 1840. Before 2011, the village was part of the Wymbritseradiel municipality.

== Gallery ==
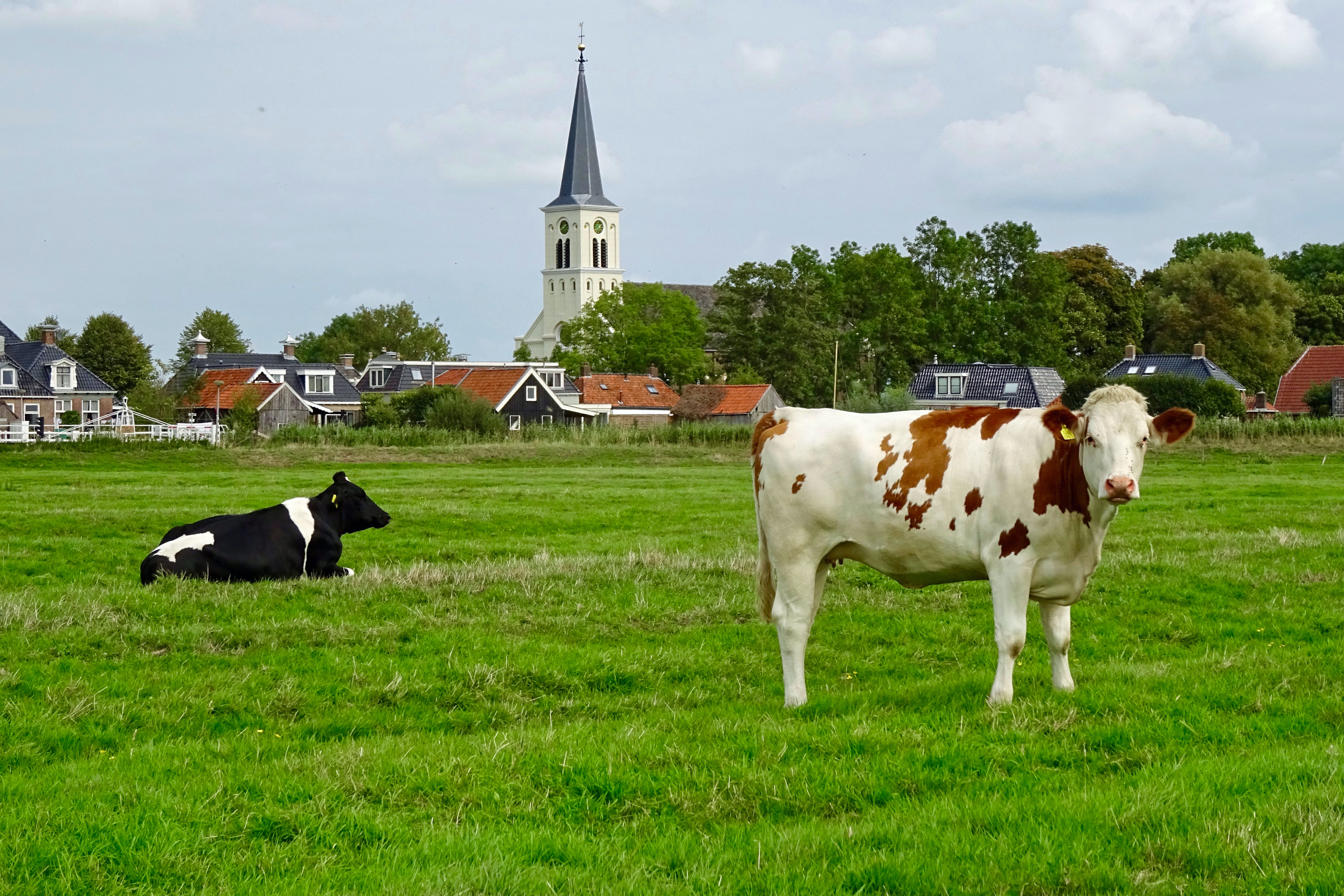
View on Oosthem and cows

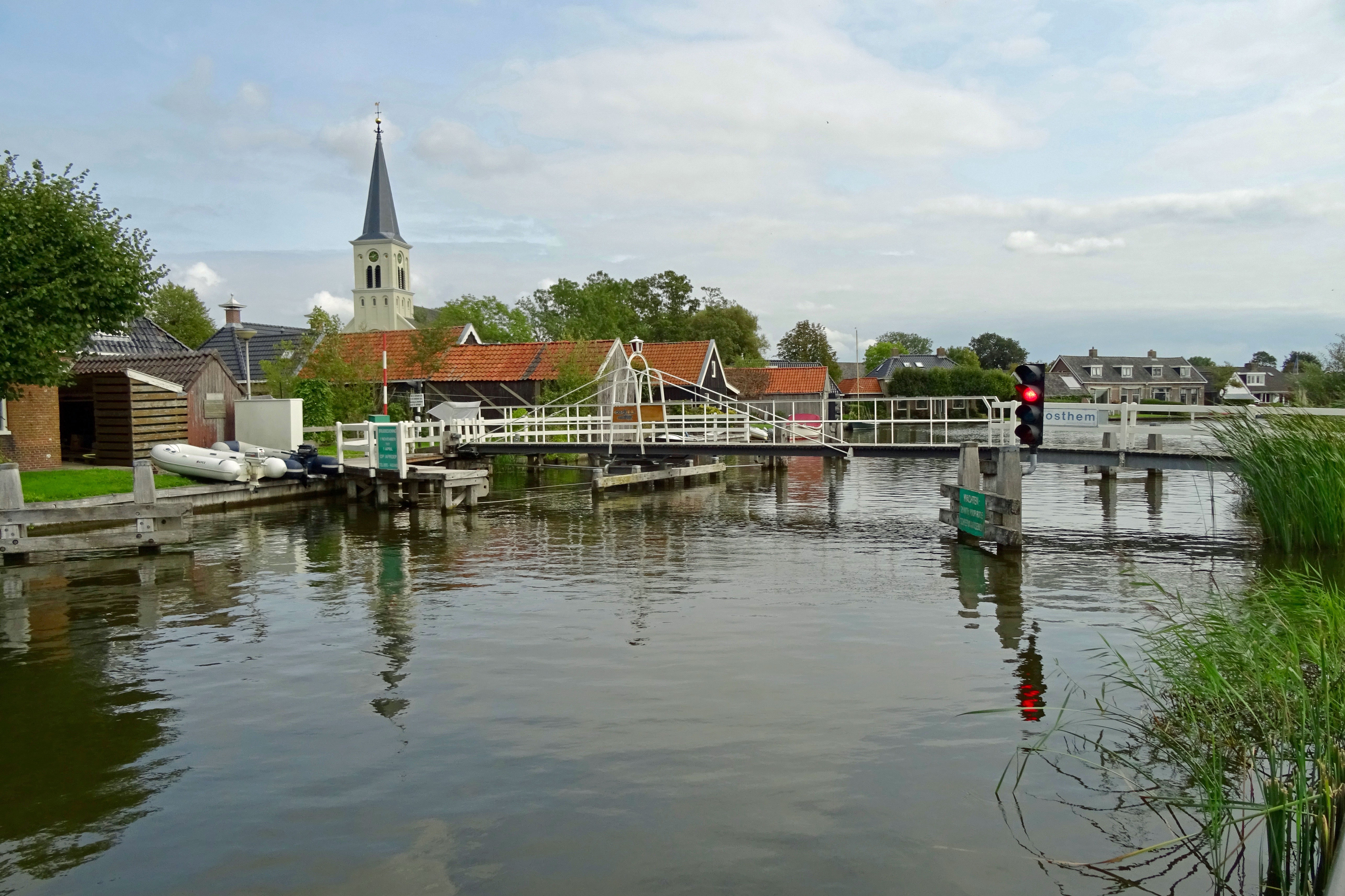
View on Oosthem from the canal
