= Ypecolsga =

Ypecolsga Ypekolsgea
- Village
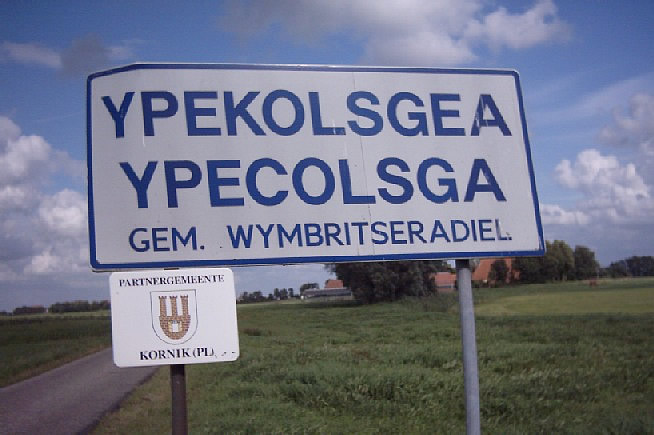
- Entering the village

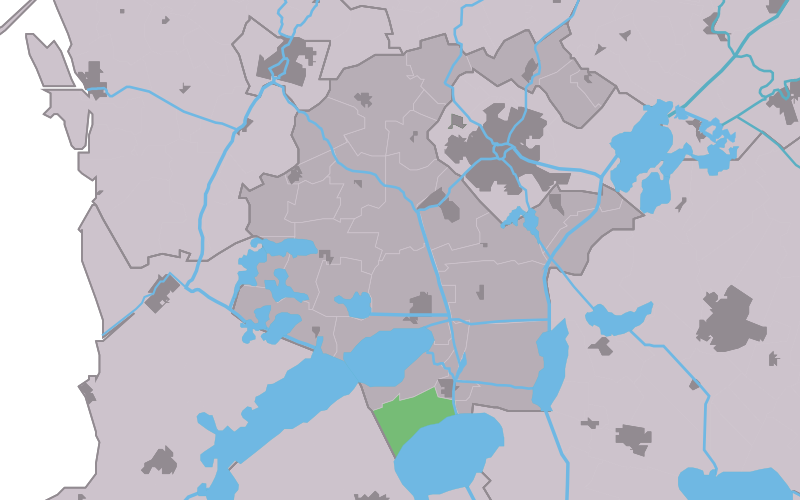
- Location in the former Wymbritseradiel municipality

- Location in the Netherlands Ypecolsga (Netherlands)
- Country: Netherlands
- Province: Friesland
- Municipality: Súdwest-Fryslân

Area
  - Total: 7.60 km^{2} (2.93 sq mi)
- Elevation: −0.2 m (−0.66 ft)

Population (2021)
  - Total: 50
  - Density: 6.6/km^{2} (17/sq mi)
- Time zone: UTC+1 (CET)
  - Summer (DST): UTC+2 (CEST)
- Postal code: 8554
- Dialing code: 0514

Ypecolsga (West Frisian: Ypekolsgea; also IJpecolsga) is a village in Súdwest-Fryslân in the province of Friesland, the Netherlands. It had a population of around 50 in January 2017.

== History ==
The village was first mentioned in 1245 as Ypekaldege. The etymology is unclear. Ypecolsga is a canal village which developed in the late middle ages along the Ee river. Woudsend began as a satellite of Ypecolsga, however it quickly outgrew by its parent, and became the main settlement in the region.

Ypecolsga used to have a stins (fortified building) which was owned by Take Abbema. In 1520, it was destroyed by the Schieringers. The church was burnt down in 1497 by soldiers. In 1664, a new church was built, but it was demolished in the 18th century and only the bell tower has remained. The tower was rebuilt in 1956.

Ypecolsga was home to 103 people in 1840. On 17 November 1942, an Avro Lancaster of the Royal Air Force was shot down and crashed into a field near Ypecolsga. The seven occupants of the plane died. Initially only two bodies were discovered by the Germans, and it was too difficult to salvage the plane. In 1951, a company specialising in salvaging aircraft, managed to remove the plane and discovered five more bodies inside. A memorial has been placed at the crash site, and also honours the resistance fighter Jacob Cornelis Nagelhou who was shot on 15 April 1945.

Before 2011, the village was part of the Wymbritseradiel municipality.

== Gallery ==
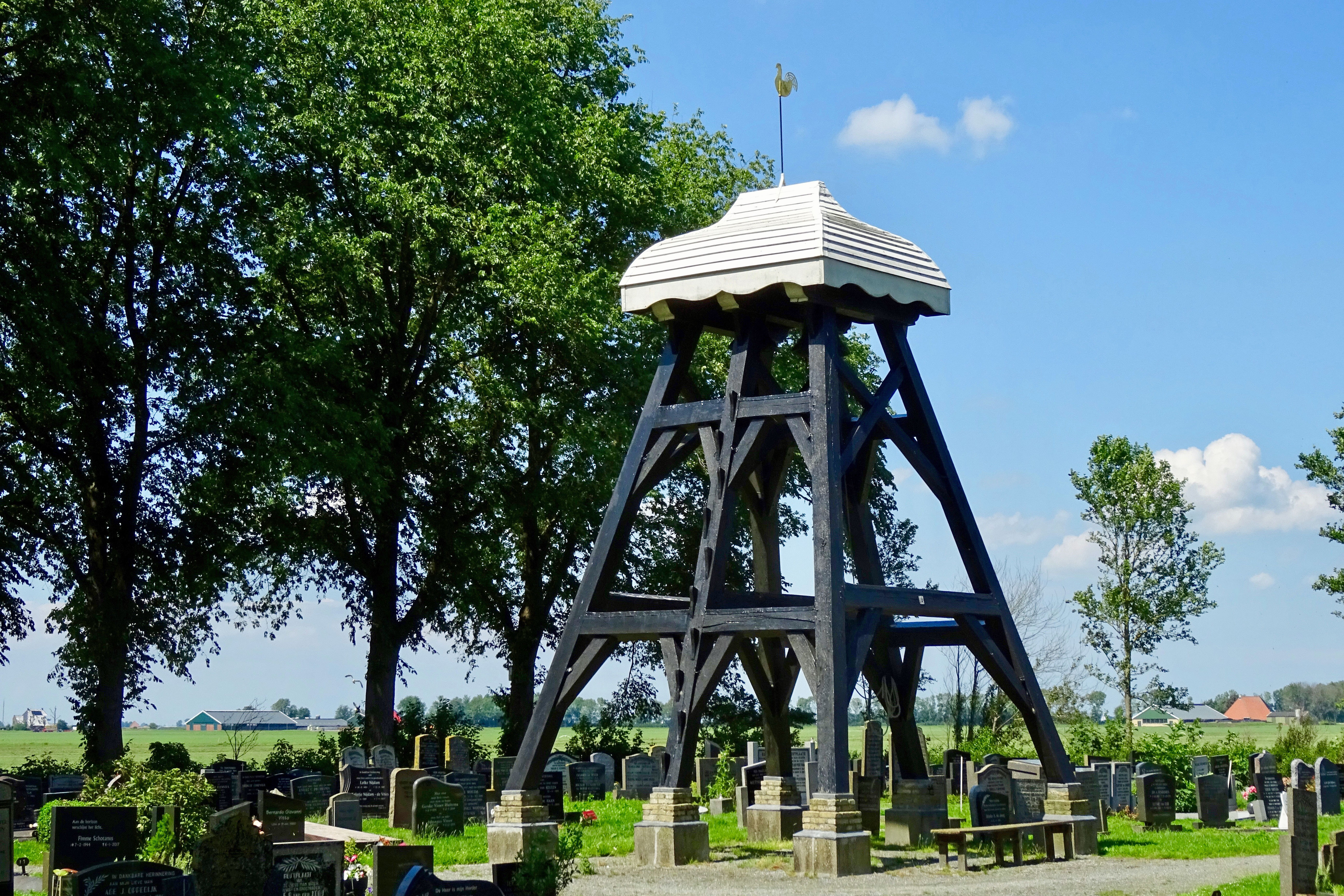
Bell tower of Ypecolsga

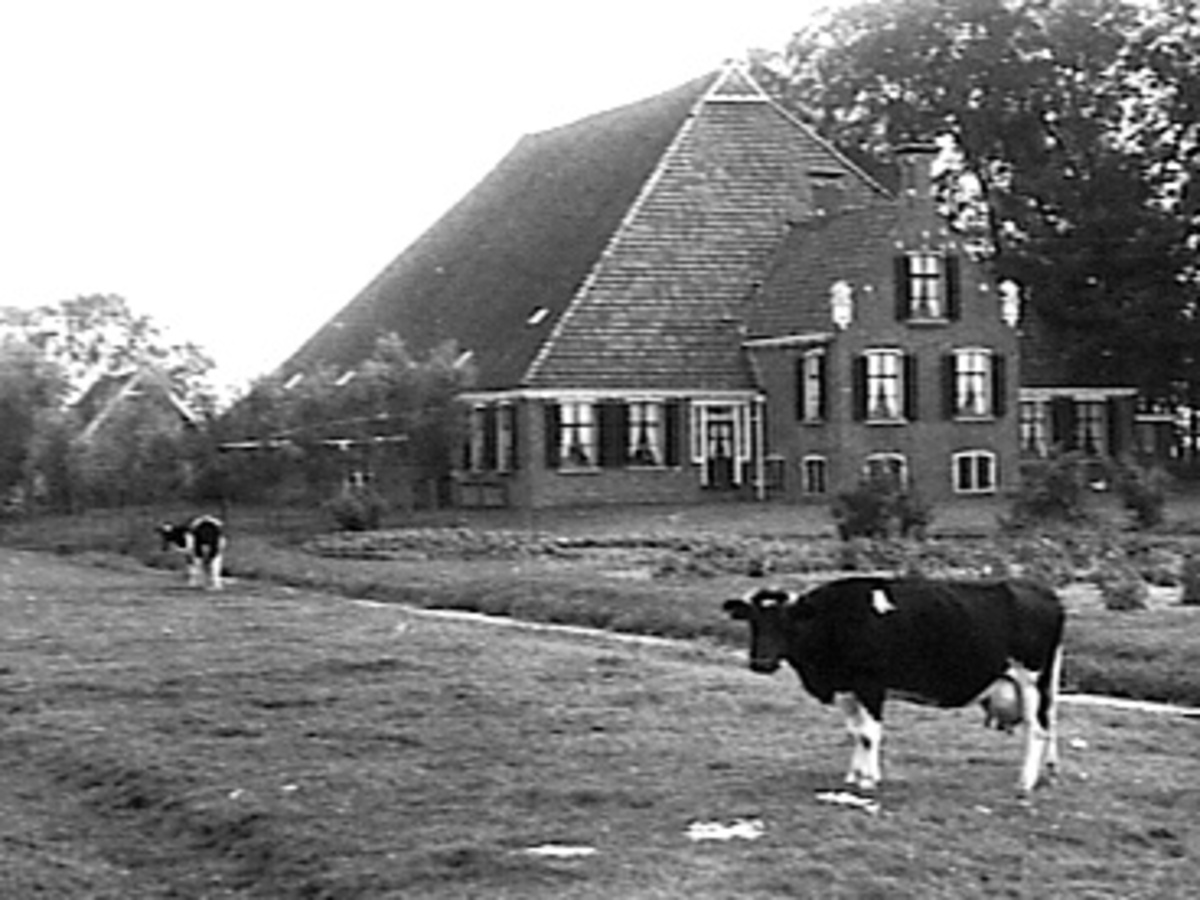
Farm in Ypecolsga
