= Westhem =

Westhem Westhim
- Village
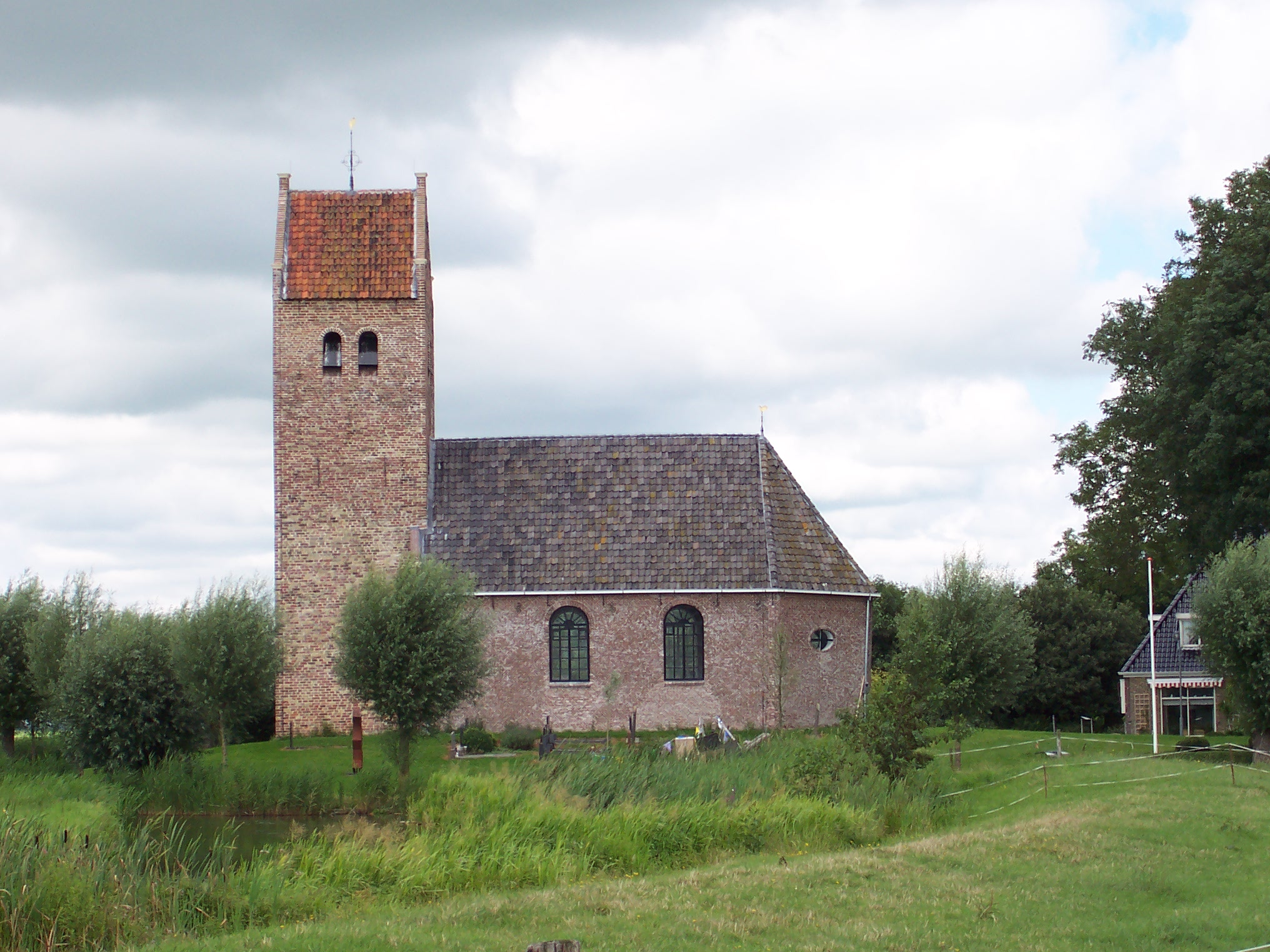
- St Bartholomew church

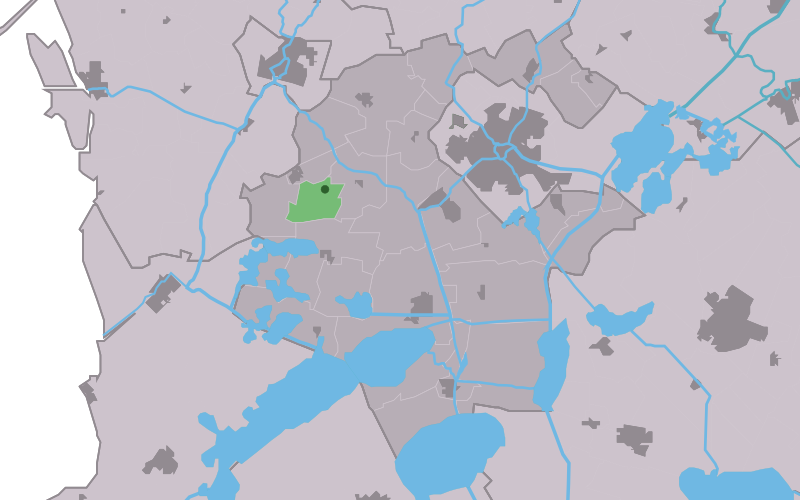
- Location in the former Wymbritseradiel municipality

- Location in the Netherlands Westhem (Netherlands)
- Country: Netherlands
- Province: Friesland
- Municipality: Súdwest-Fryslân

Area
  - Total: 3.17 km^{2} (1.22 sq mi)
- Elevation: −1.0 m (−3.3 ft)

Population (2021)
  - Total: 70
  - Density: 22/km^{2} (57/sq mi)
- Time zone: UTC+1 (CET)
  - Summer (DST): UTC+2 (CEST)
- Postal code: 8616
- Dialing code: 0515

Westhem (West Frisian: Westhim) is a village in the Súdwest-Fryslân municipality, in the province of Friesland, the Netherlands. It had a population of around 70 in January 2017.

== History ==
The village was first mentioned in the 13th century as "Westhem, alias Hemdijck". The etymology is unclear. Westhem is a little terp (artificial living hill) village which developed in the middle ages. The terp part is called Feyteburen, and the linear settlement along the dike is called De Kat. In 1633, the Atsebuurstermeer, a former lake, was poldered and a sluice was built near De Kat.

Around 1450, there was battle between the Vetkopers and Schieringers in Westhem and the church was burned down. The current church was built in 1708. The tower dates from the 13th century and contains a bell from 1353.

Westhem was home to 122 people in 1840. In 1949, it was given the status of village. Until 2011 it belonged to the former municipality of Wymbritseradiel.

== Gallery ==
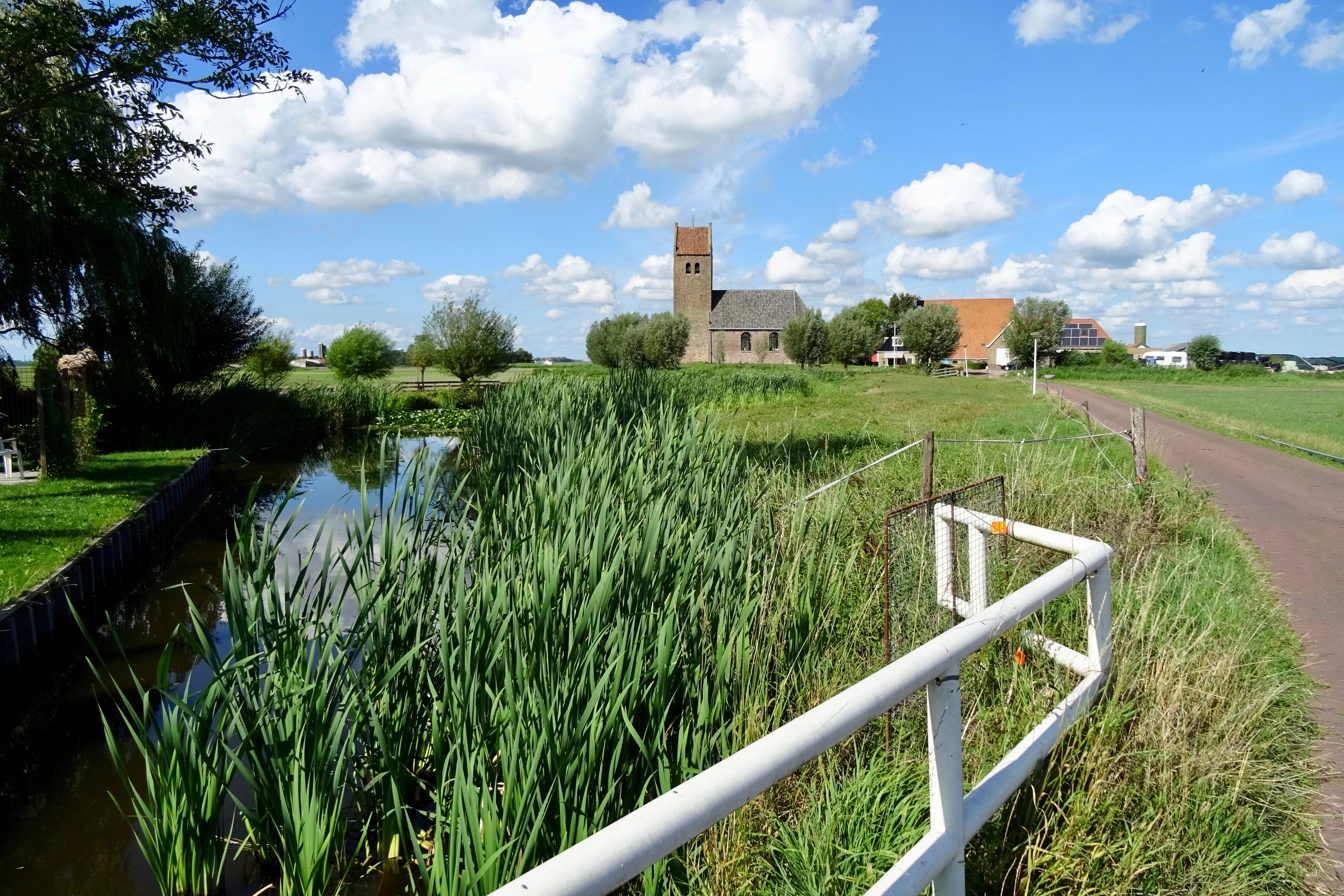
View on Westhem

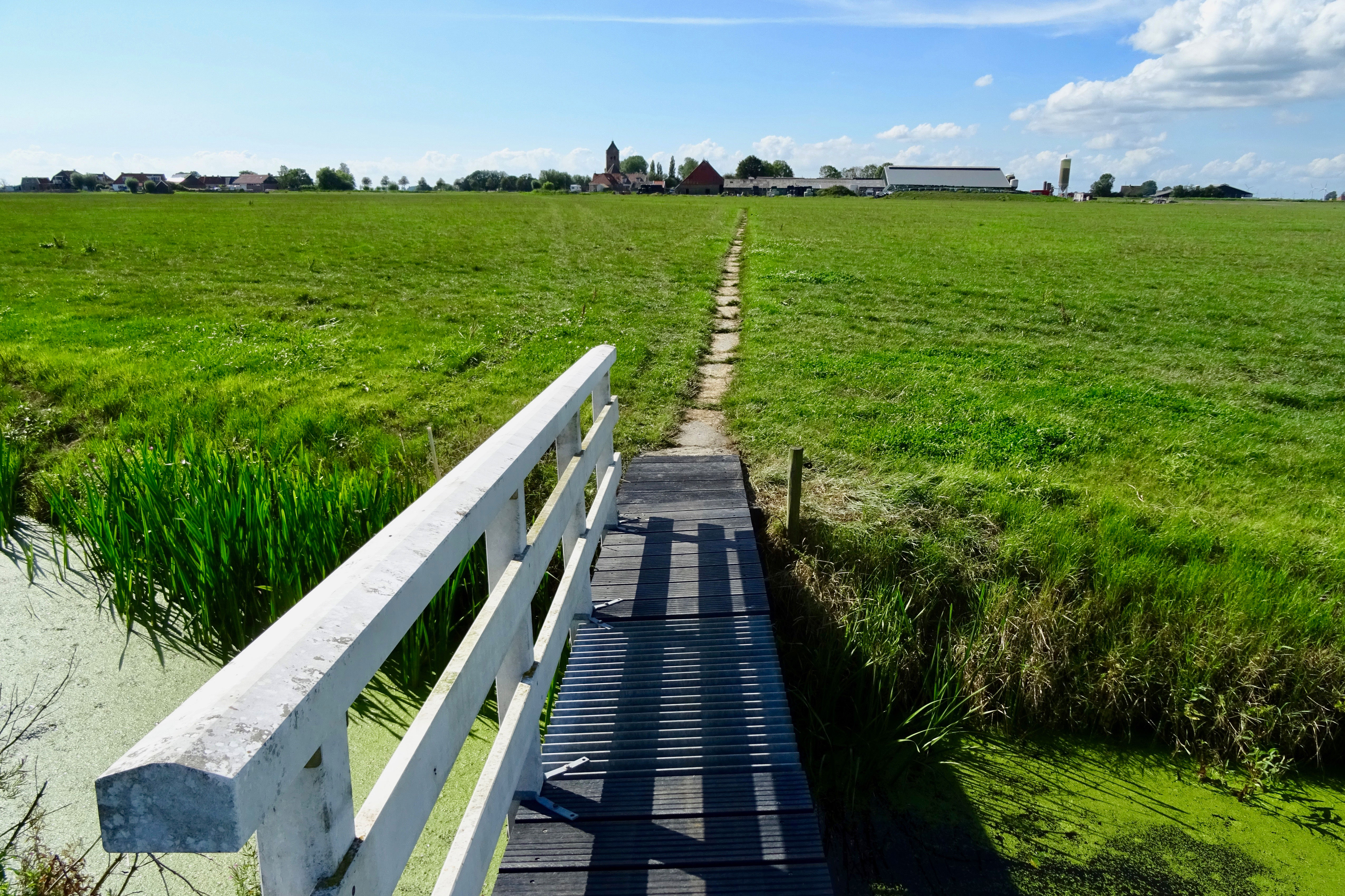
The church path through the fields
