= Longerhouw =

Longerhouw Longerhou
- Village
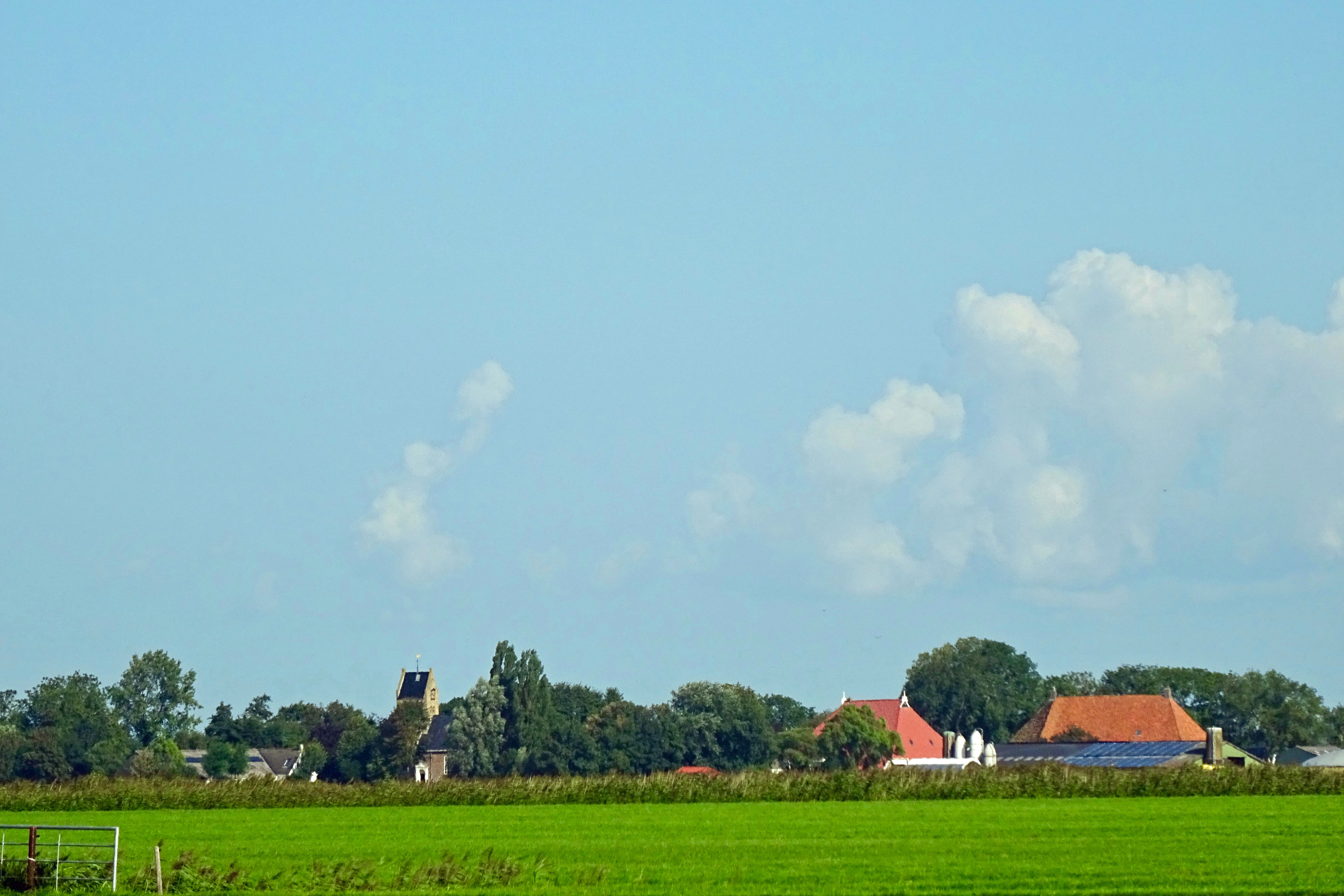
- View on Longerhouw

- Flag Coat of arms

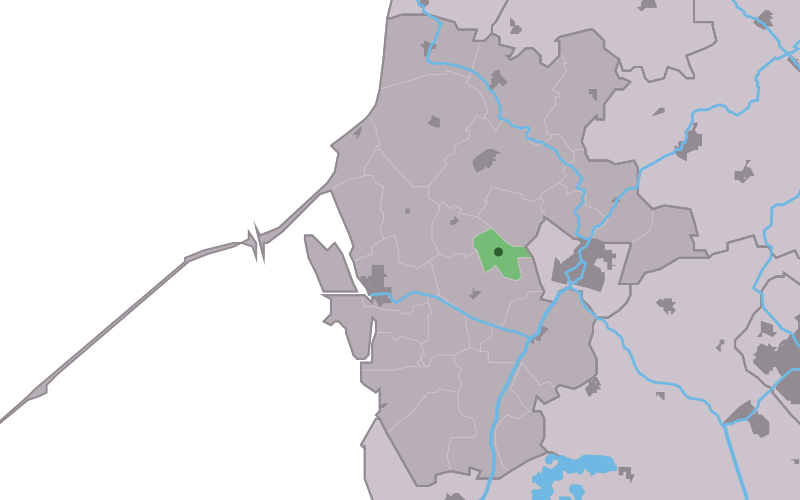
- Location in the former Wûnseradiel municipality

- Location in the Netherlands Longerhouw (Netherlands)
- Country: Netherlands
- Province: Friesland
- Municipality: Súdwest-Fryslân

Area
  - Total: 2.48 km^{2} (0.96 sq mi)
- Elevation: 0.5 m (1.6 ft)

Population (2021)
  - Total: 55
  - Density: 22/km^{2} (57/sq mi)
- Time zone: UTC+1 (CET)
  - Summer (DST): UTC+2 (CEST)
- Postal code: 8745
- Dialing code: 0517

Longerhouw (West Frisian: Longerhou) is a small village in Súdwest-Fryslân municipality in the province of Friesland, the Netherlands. It had a population of around 50 in January 2017.

== History ==
The village was first mentioned in the 13th century as Langherahof, and means long barnyard. Longerhouw is a terp (artificial living hill) village to the south of the former Marneslenk. Its only connection to the outside world used to be the Makkumervaart, and there is a still a little harbour.

The Dutch Reformed church was renovated in 1757. On the inside there are wooden panels which depict the birth of Christ, crucifixion, ascent to heaven and last judgement in meticulous detail. The artist used to be unknown, but in 2018, it was identified as a creation of Gerben Jelles Nauta.

Longerhouw was home to 90 people in 1840. Before 2011, the village was part of the Wûnseradiel municipality.

== Gallery ==
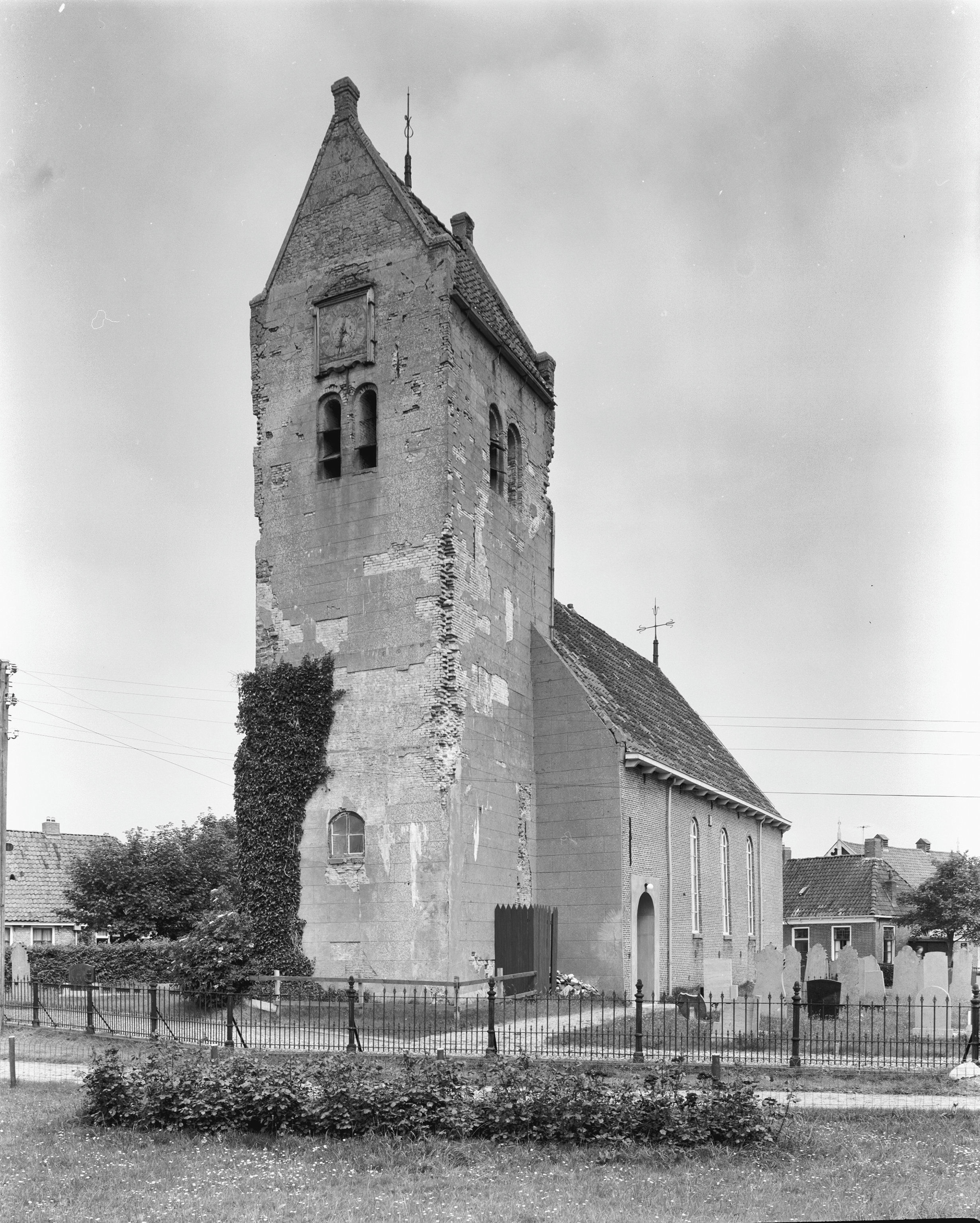
Longerhouw Church (1965)
