= Sandfirden =

Sandfirden Sânfurd
- Village
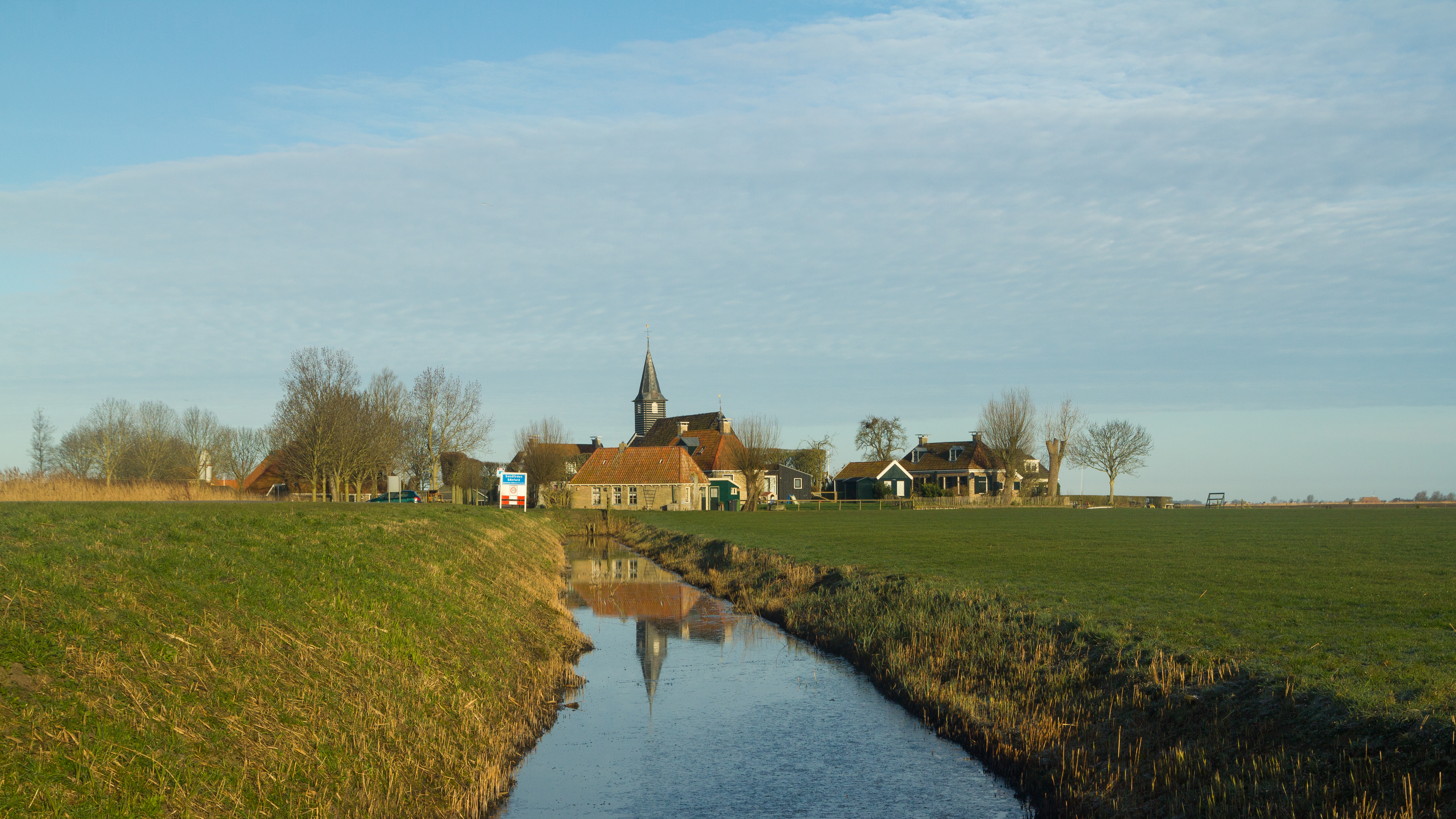
- Sandfirden in 2015

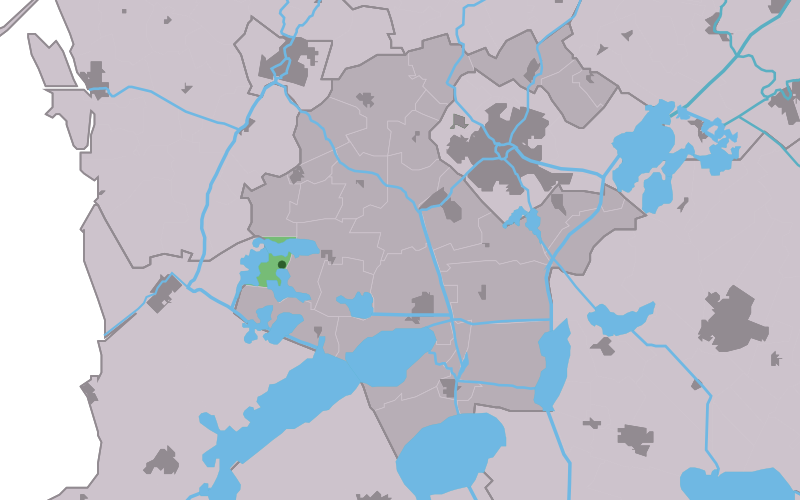
- Location in the former Wymbritseradiel municipality

- Location in the Netherlands Sandfirden (Netherlands)
- Country: Netherlands
- Province: Friesland
- Municipality: Súdwest-Fryslân

Area
  - Total: 3.17 km^{2} (1.22 sq mi)
- Elevation: 0.0 m (0 ft)

Population (2021)
  - Total: 30
  - Density: 9.5/km^{2} (25/sq mi)
- Time zone: UTC+1 (CET)
  - Summer (DST): UTC+2 (CEST)
- Postal code: 8613
- Dialing code: 0515

Sandfirden (West Frisian: Sânfurd) is a small village in Súdwest-Fryslân municipality in the province of Friesland, the Netherlands. It had a population of around 25 in January 2017.

== History ==
The village was first mentioned in 1245 as Sandforde, and means sand and fordable place. Sandfirden is a little terp (artificial living mound) village which developed during the Middle Ages around lakes. It used to be accessible only by water. Sandfirden consists of only one street without a name.

In 1399, funds were provided by Albert I, Duke of Bavaria to build a church. The church was replaced in 1732. The tower was struck by lightning and damaged in 1970. Nowadays, the church is in use for weddings, concerts and parties.

Sandfirden was home to 52 people in 1840. During World War II, the village was home to many onderduikers (people in hiding). One farm was burnt down after a weapons stash had been discovered by the Germans. Before 2011, the village was part of the Wymbritseradiel municipality.

== Gallery ==
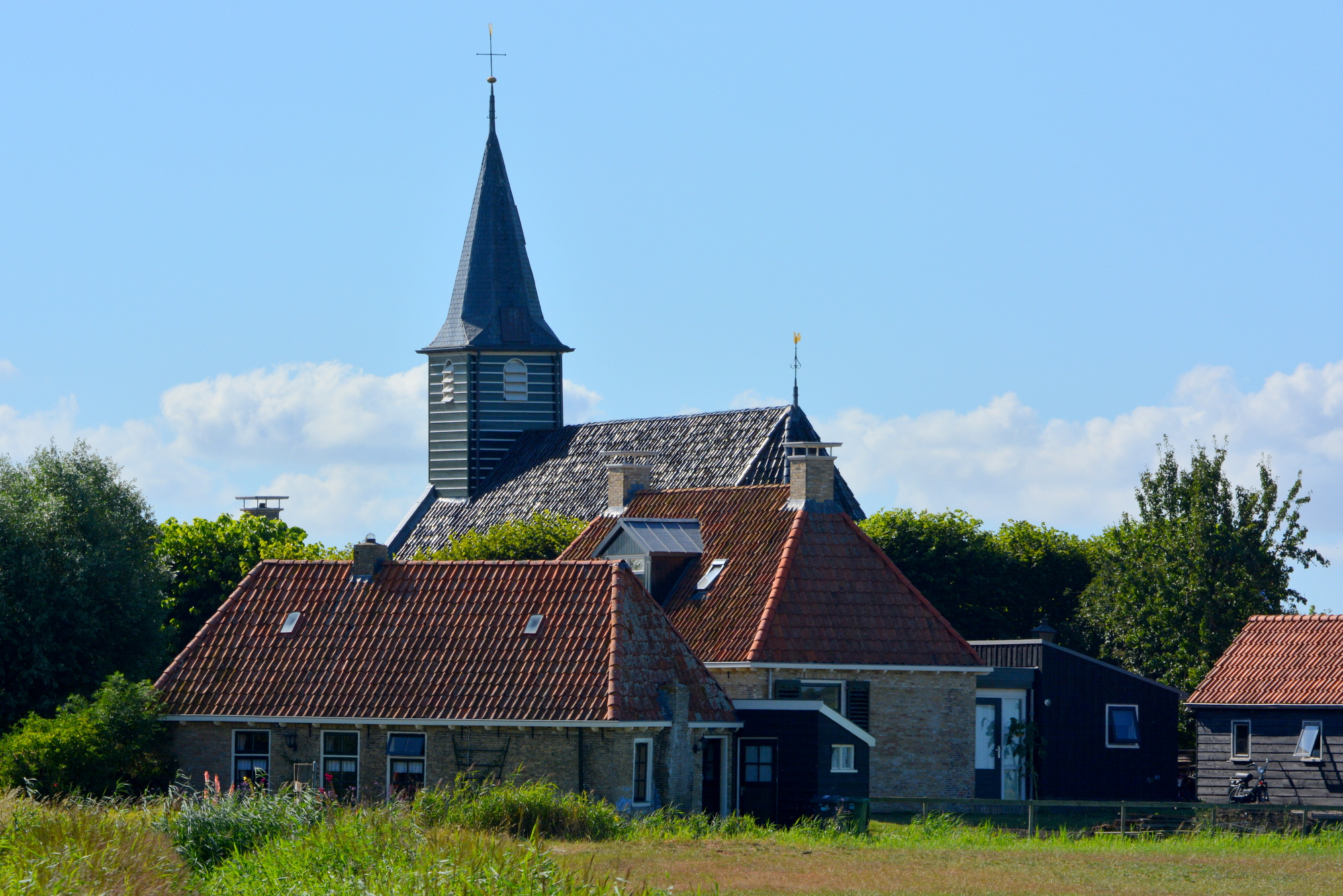
Church of Sandfirden
