= Jannewietske de Vries =

Dutch politician

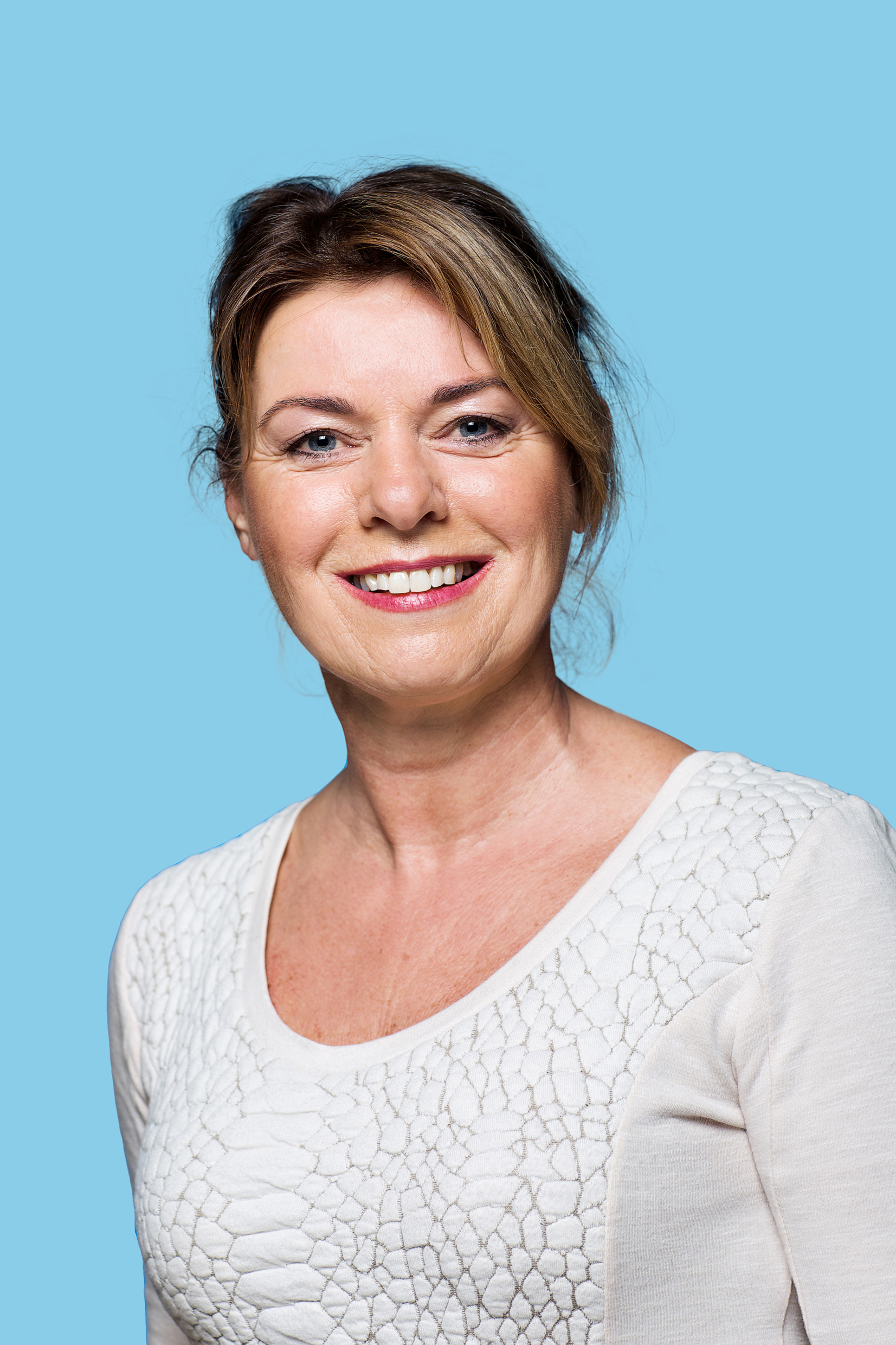
Jannewietske de Vries

Jannewietske Annie de Vries (born 11 November 1961 in Bitgum) is a Frisian politician and a member of the Dutch Labour Party (PvdA). She was a member of the provincial executive of Friesland from 2007 to 2015.

Since 2018 she has been mayor of Súdwest-Fryslân.
