= Reahûs =

Roodhuis Reahûs
- Village
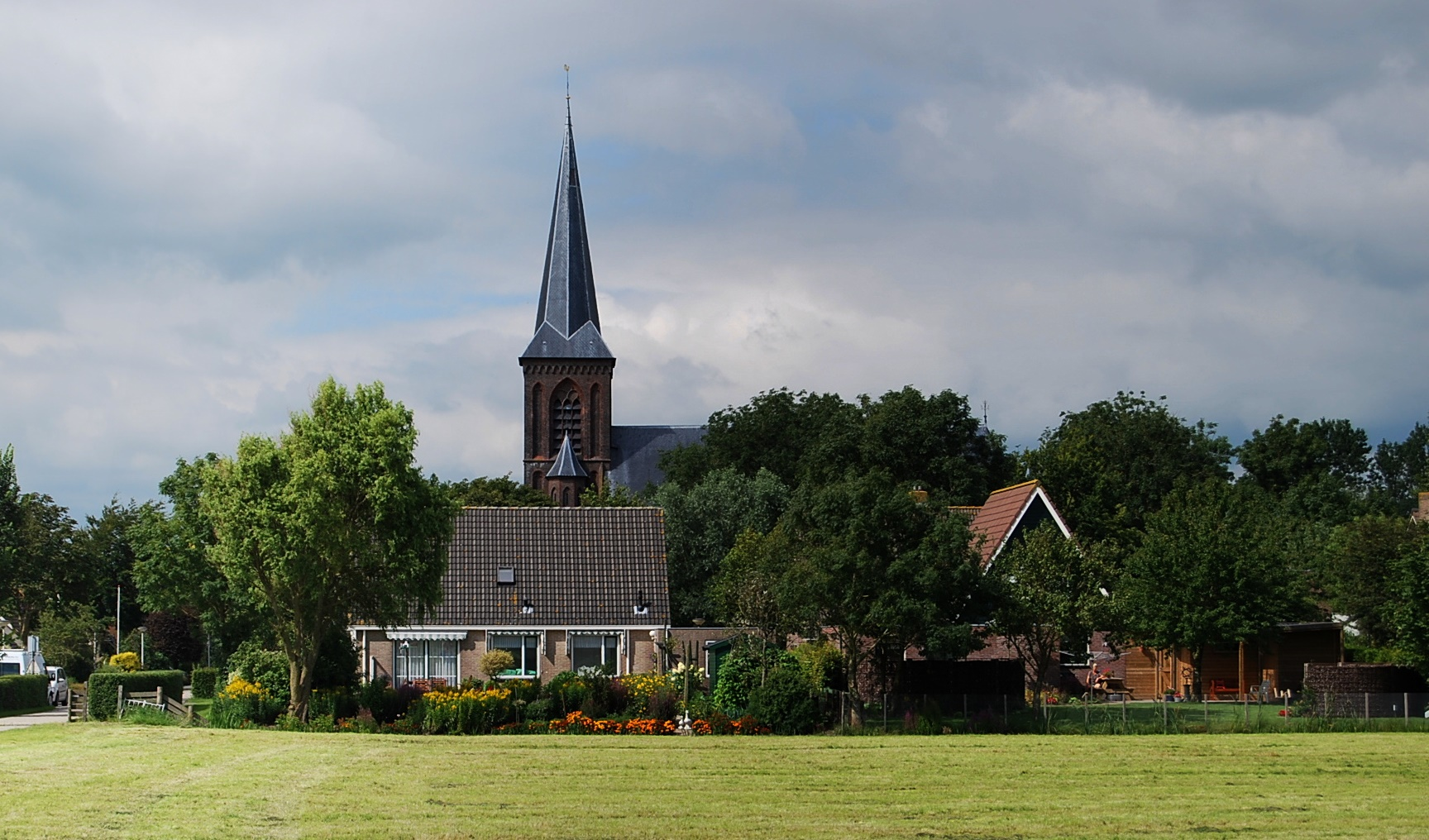
- Reahûs with St Martin's church

- Coat of arms

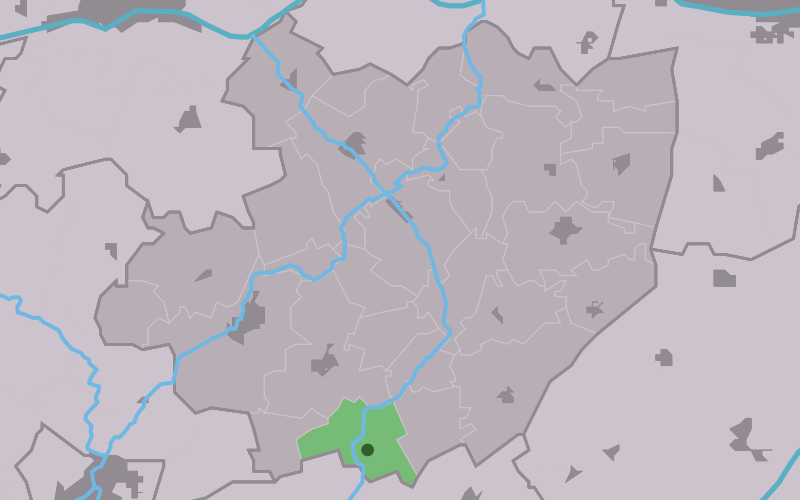
- Location in the former Littenseradiel municipality

- Location in the Netherlands Roodhuis (Netherlands)
- Country: Netherlands
- Province: Friesland
- Municipality: Súdwest-Fryslân

Area
  - Total: 4.44 km^{2} (1.71 sq mi)
- Elevation: 0.3 m (0.98 ft)

Population (2021)
  - Total: 185
  - Density: 41.7/km^{2} (108/sq mi)
- Time zone: UTC+1 (CET)
  - Summer (DST): UTC+2 (CEST)
- Postal code: 8736
- Dialing code: 0515

Reahûs (Dutch: Roodhuis) is a village in Súdwest-Fryslân municipality in the province of Friesland, the Netherlands. It had a population of around 170 in January 2017.

== History ==
The village was first mentioned in 1861 as Roodhuis, and means "red house" which refers to a farm from 1639 with a red tiled roof. The farm used to contain a clandestine church for the Catholics.

In 1892, the Catholic St Martin Church was built in Gothic Revival style. The church contains a 15th century statue of St Martin on a horse which was originally located in Easterein and hidden during the Reformation.

Reahûs was home to 28 people in 1840. Reahûs was awarded village status in 1955. Before 2018, the village was part of the Littenseradiel municipality and before 1984 it belonged to Hennaarderadeel municipality.
