= Loënga =

Loënga Loaiïngea
- Neighbourhood and former village
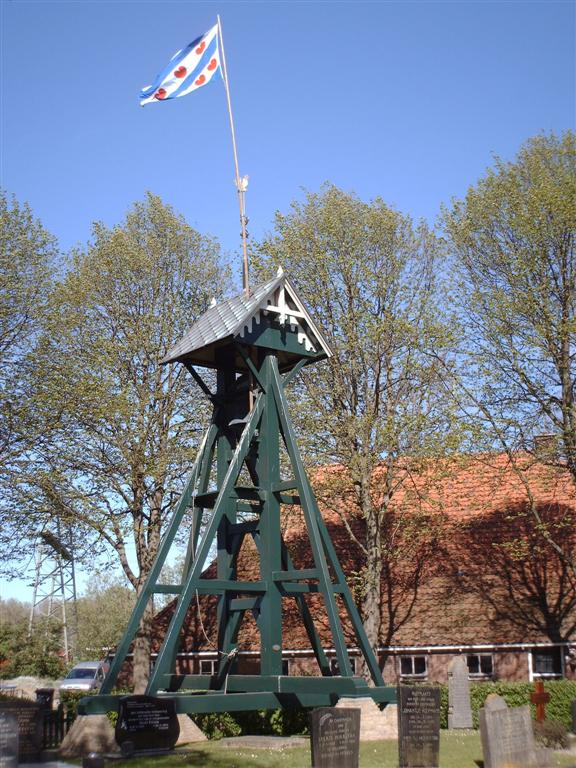
- Loënga belfry

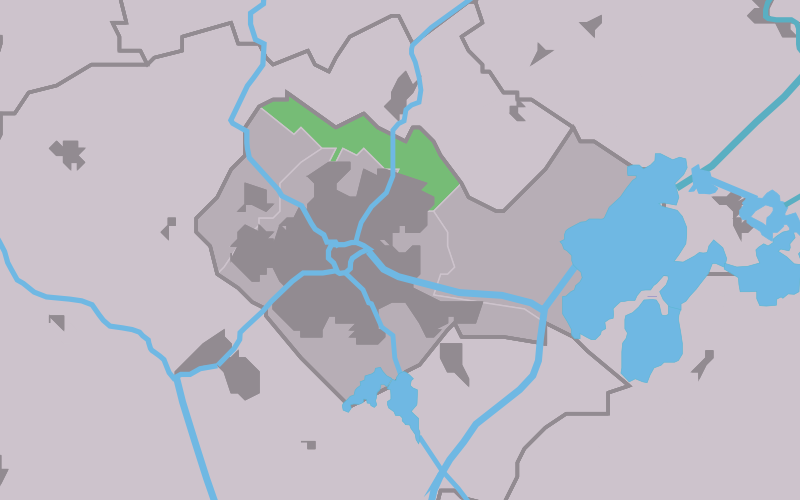
- Location in the former Sneek municipality

- Location in the Netherlands Loënga (Netherlands)
- Country: Netherlands
- Province: Friesland
- Municipality: Súdwest-Fryslân

Area
  - Total: 2.75 km^{2} (1.06 sq mi)
- Elevation: 0.5 m (1.6 ft)

Population (2021)
  - Total: 450
  - Density: 160/km^{2} (420/sq mi)
- Time zone: UTC+1 (CET)
  - Summer (DST): UTC+2 (CEST)
- Postal code: 8603
- Dialing code: 0515

Loënga (West Frisian: Loaiïngea) is neighbourhood of Sneek and a former village in Súdwest-Fryslân municipality in the province of Friesland, the Netherlands. It has a population of around 95 in January 2017. In 1984, Loënga and Offingawier were annexed by Sneek and are no longer independent villages.

== History ==
The village was first mentioned in 1335 as "in Loinghum", and means "settlement of the people of Lode". Loënga was a terp (artificial living hill) village.

The Dutch Reformed church dated from the 14th century, but was torn down in the middle of the 17th century. In 1620, a little belfry was placed in the cemetery.

Loënga was home to 70 people in 1840. In 1984, it was annexed by the city of Sneek. Before 2011, the village was part of Sneek municipality and before 1984 it belonged to Wymbritseradiel municipality.
