= Indijk, Súdwest-Fryslân =

Indijk Yndyk
- Village
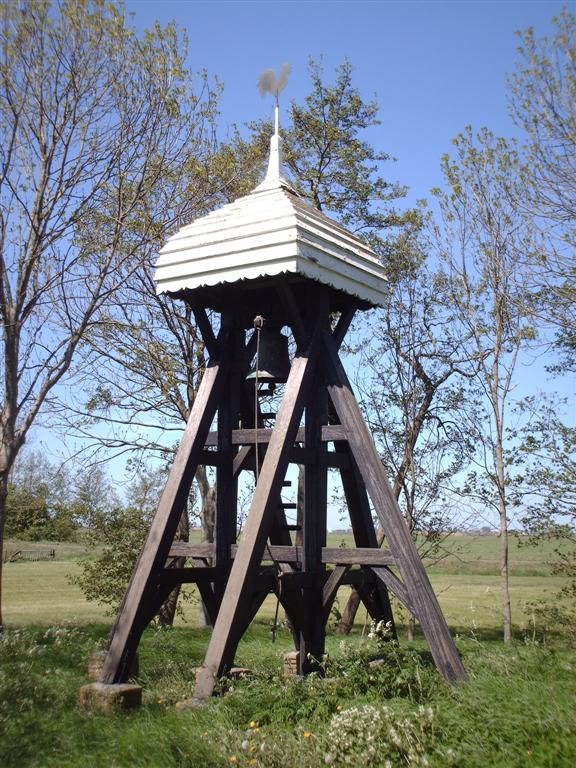
- Indijk bellfray

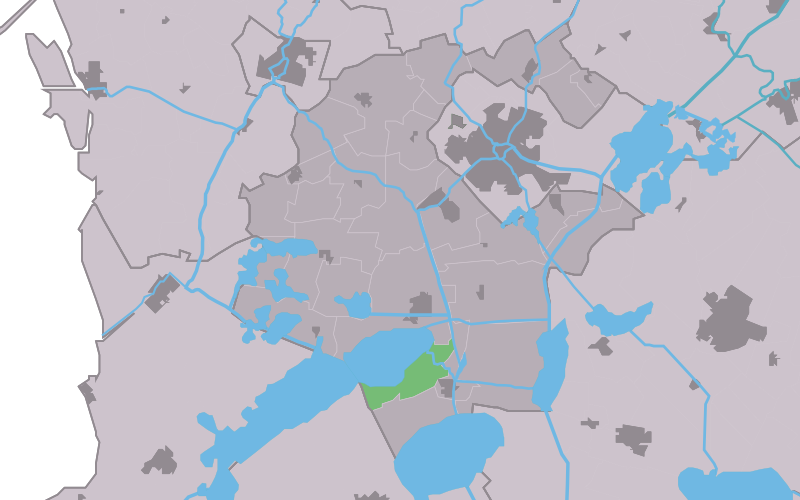
- Location in the former Wymbritseradiel municipality

- Location in the Netherlands Indijk (Netherlands)
- Country: Netherlands
- Province: Friesland
- Municipality: Súdwest-Fryslân

Area
  - Total: 7.91 km^{2} (3.05 sq mi)
- Elevation: 0.1 m (0.33 ft)

Population (2021)
  - Total: 115
  - Density: 14.5/km^{2} (37.7/sq mi)
- Time zone: UTC+1 (CET)
  - Summer (DST): UTC+2 (CEST)
- Postal code: 8553
- Dialing code: 0514

Indijk (West Frisian: Yndyk) is a village in the northern Netherlands. It is located in Súdwest-Fryslân municipality, Friesland and had a population of around 105 in January 2017.

== History ==
The village was first mentioned in 1449 as Indyck, and means "interior dike. Indijk developed in the late middle ages along the Ee river.

In 1497, the church was burned down by soldiers. In 1520, the village was destroyed by Schieringers. A new church was built, but had turned into a ruin by 1720, and was later demolished. A belfry was placed on the cemetery instead. In 1949, it was destroyed by a sorm and rebuilt in 1956.

Indijk was home to 65 people in 1840. Before 2011, the village was part of the Wymbritseradiel municipality.
