= Hichtum =

- Village
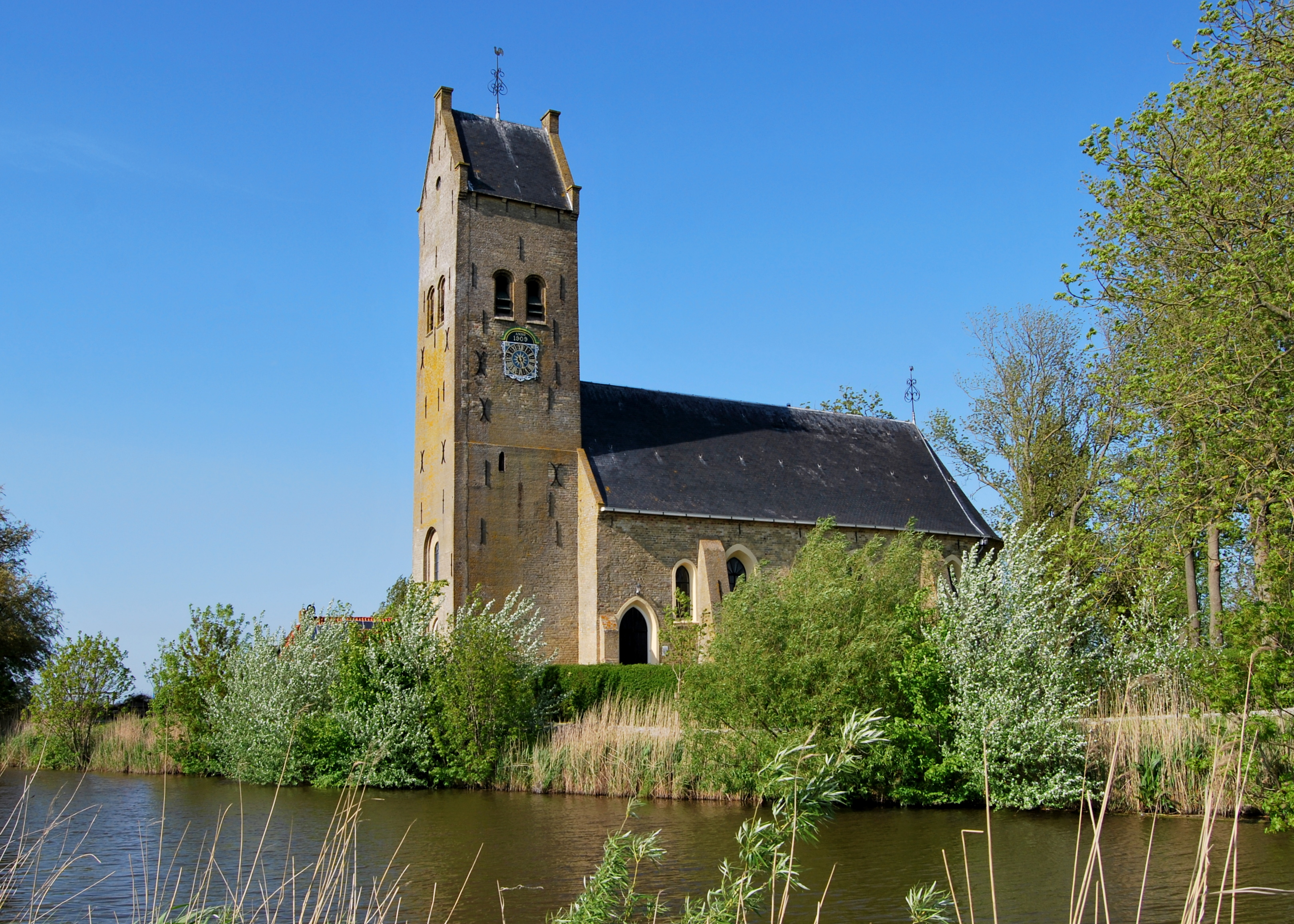
- Hichtum Church

- Flag Coat of arms

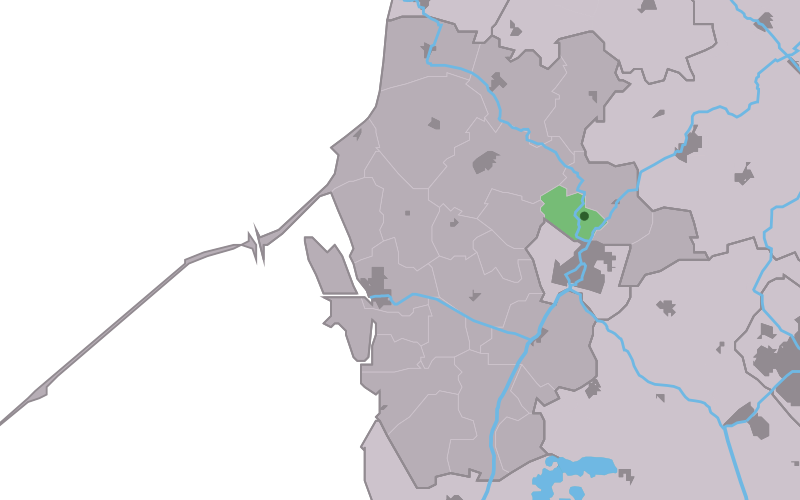
- Location in the former Wûnseradiel municipality

- Location in the Netherlands Hichtum (Netherlands)
- Country: Netherlands
- Province: Friesland
- Municipality: Súdwest-Fryslân

Area
  - Total: 3.30 km^{2} (1.27 sq mi)
- Elevation: 0.1 m (0.33 ft)

Population (2021)
  - Total: 80
  - Density: 24/km^{2} (63/sq mi)
- Time zone: UTC+1 (CET)
  - Summer (DST): UTC+2 (CEST)
- Postal code: 8743
- Dialing code: 0515

Hichtum is a small village in Súdwest-Fryslân municipality in the province of Friesland, the Netherlands. It had a population of around 80 in January 2017.

== History ==
The village was first mentioned in the 13th century as Hetlum, and means "settlement of Higt (person)". Hichtum is a terp (artificial living hill) village near Bolsward. The Dutch Reformed church dates from around 1200.

The stins Wibranda State was located near Hichtum. It had existed in the early 15th century. The estate contained 25 rooms and had a large garden with fruit trees. The estate was demolished in the 1830s and replaced by a farm.

Hichtum was home to 105 people in 1840. The hamlet Sieswerd used to be part of Hichtum, but has become separated by the construction of the N359 road. Before 2011, the village was part of the Wûnseradiel municipality.
