= Abbegea =

Abbega Abbegea
- Village
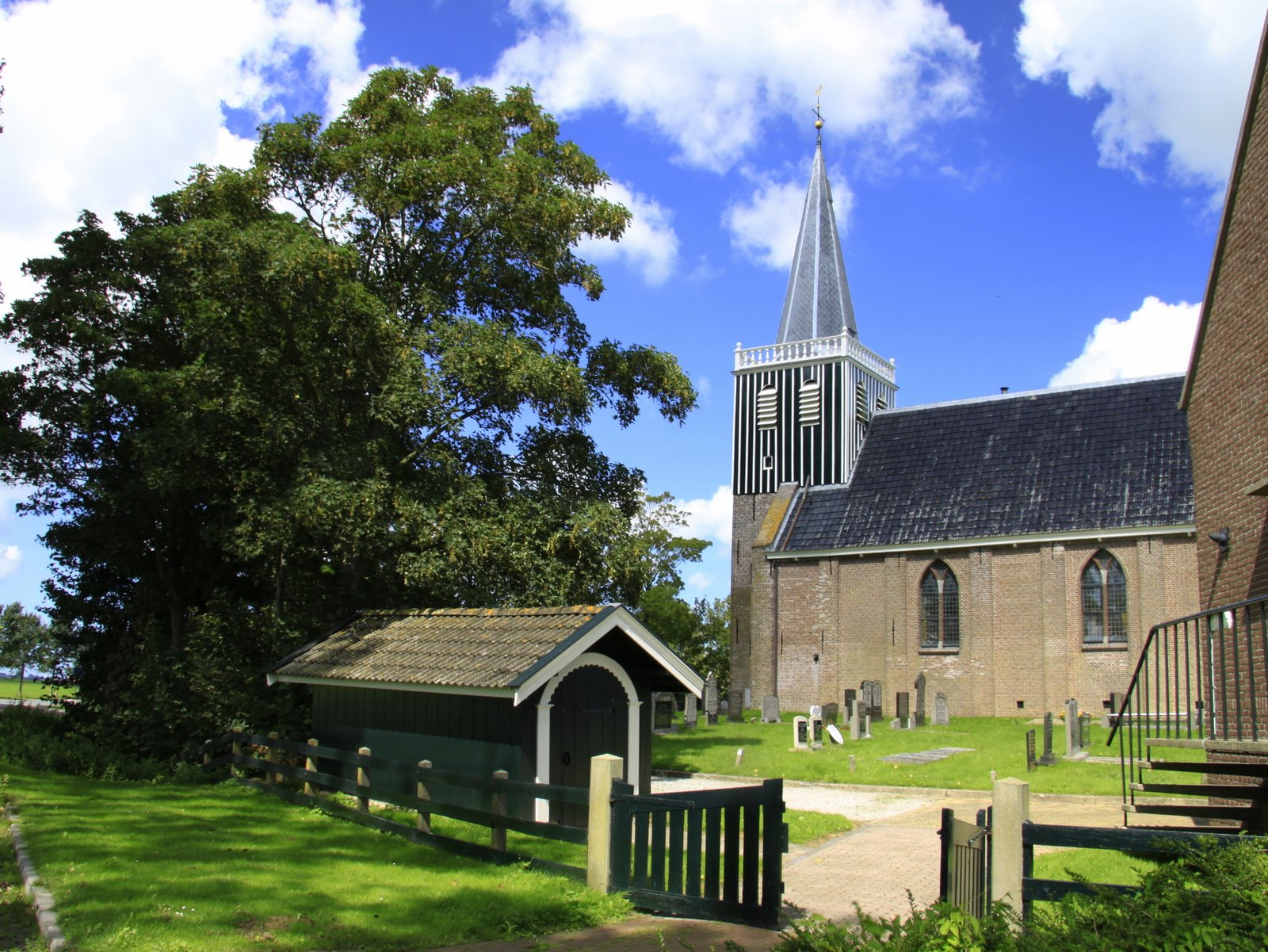
- St Gertrude's Church

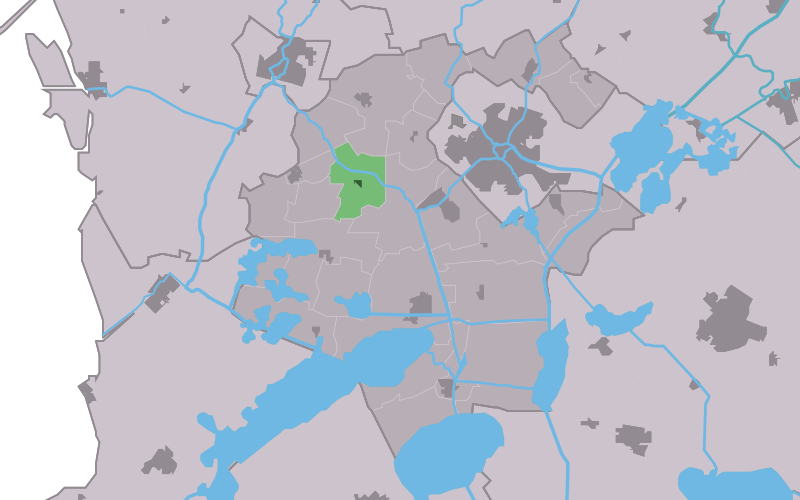
- Location in the former Wymbritseradiel municipality

- Location in the Netherlands Abbega (Netherlands)
- Country: Netherlands
- Province: Friesland
- Municipality: Súdwest-Fryslân

Area
  - Total: 0.24 km^{2} (0.093 sq mi)
- Elevation: 0.1 m (0.33 ft)

Population (2021)
  - Total: 230
  - Density: 960/km^{2} (2,500/sq mi)
- Time zone: UTC+1 (CET)
  - Summer (DST): UTC+2 (CEST)
- Postal code: 8617
- Dialing code: 0515

Abbegea (Dutch: Abbega) is a village in the Dutch province of Friesland. It is in the municipality of Súdwest-Fryslân, about 6 km west of the city of Sneek. Abbegea had about 245 inhabitants in January 2017.

== History ==
The village was first mentioned between 1250 and 1275 as Abbahem, and means "settlement of Abbe (person)". Abbegea is a terp (artificial living hill) village which developed between 1000 and 1200. It was well connected on the waterways, but had no road connections for most of its history.

The Dutch Reformed church is from the middle ages which is surrounded by a moat. The church has been extensively modified in 1809, and a new tower was built. The oldest tower remained standing for a while, because there was dispute between the Catholics and the Protestants about who owned the bells.

Abbegea was home to 113 people in 1840.

Before 2011, the village was part of the Wymbritseradiel municipality.
