= Jacob Potma =

Dutch Golden Age painter

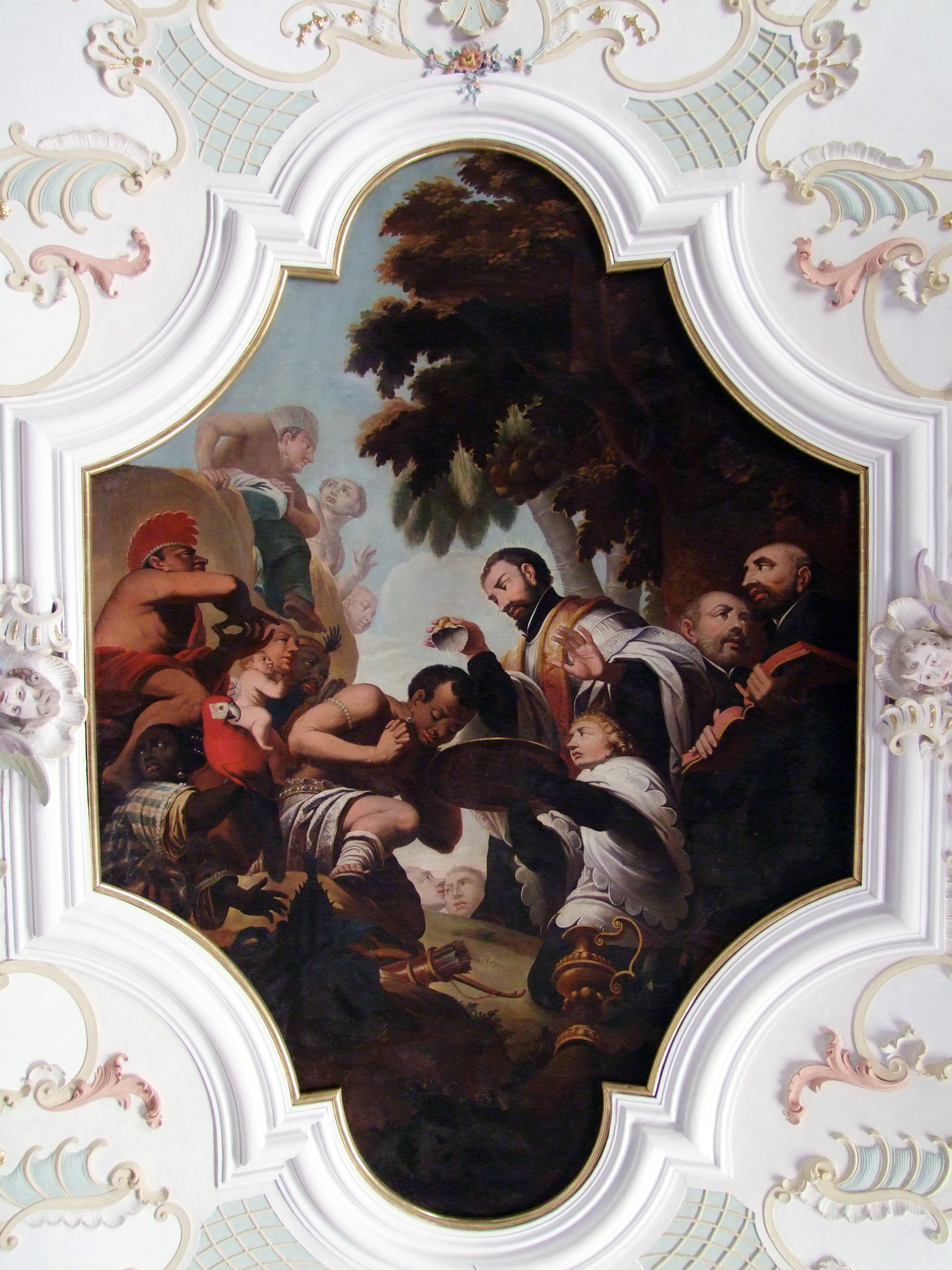
Franz Xavier baptizing a heathen, ceiling decoration in the Jesuit chapel of Mindelheim, 1694

Jacob Potma (c. 1630, Workum – 1704, Munich), was a Dutch Golden Age painter.

== Biography ==
According to Houbraken, who listed him as the most famous pupil of Wybrand de Geest, he was born in Workum and became Kamerling or court painter for the Kurfürst of Vienna. He died of "Rooloop"or red runs, which killed a large part of the army in Vienna in 1684.

According to the RKD he was pupil of Wybrand de Geest known for portraits and interior decorations, and was born 1600-1620. His last name is also spelled as Bodma, Pottma, or Pohmar.
