= Haifa (disambiguation) =

Haifa is an Israeli port city.

Haifa may also refer to:

== Places ==
- Haifa District, an administrative district surrounding the city of Haifa
- Haifa metropolitan area
- Haifa Bay, a bay near Haifa
- Haifa Street, in Baghdad, Iraq
- Haifa Airport (known as RAF Haifa, a Royal Air Force station, between 1942 and 1948)
- Port of Haifa, the largest Israel's international seaport

== People ==
- Haifa Abdelhak (born 1982), Tunisian handball player
- Haifa al-Agha, Palestinian politician
- Haifa al-Bakr, Qatari lawyer
- Haifaa al-Mansour (born 1974), Saudi film director
- Haifa al-Mogrin, Saudi royal
- Haifa Beseisso (born 1990), Palestinian-American YouTuber
- Haifa bint Faisal Al Saud (born 1950), Saudi royal
- Haifa bint Muhammad Al Saud, Saudi royal
- Haifa Charbel, Lebanese television presenter
- Haifa El Aissami (born 1971), Venezuelan lawyer
- Haifa Guedri (born 1989), Tunisian footballer
- Haifa Hussein (born 1979), Bahraini actress and singer
- Haifaa Jawad, Iraqi Muslim scholar
- Haifa Kamal (born 1983), Jordanian singer
- Haifa Najjar (born 1959), Jordanian politician
- Haifa Rahim, Algerian actress
- Haifa Wehbe (born 1976), Lebanese singer
- Haifa Zangana (born 1950), Iraqi novelist
- Hayfa Baytar (born 1960), Syrian novelist

== Other ==
- Haifa (film), a 1996 film
- HAIFA construction, a design for cryptographic hash functions
- The Haifa Room, a Canadian restaurant named after the city
