= Hayla Ghazal =

Syrian blogger and activist

- Born: 1995 (age 30–31)
- Education: American University in Dubai (BA)

YouTube information
- Channel: Hayla TV
- Years active: 2013-present
- Subscribers: 8.99 million
- Views: 1.289 billion
- Last updated: 10 July 2025

Hayla Ghazal (Arabic: هيلا غزال; born 1995) is a Syrian internet personality based in Dubai. She is a Change Ambassador for Goodwill for the United Nations. She was awarded the Arab Women's Award for the New Media Category in 2016 and was listed as one of the 100 Most Influential Arab Youth in the World Under 40 the same year.

== Early life ==
Ghazal was born 1995 in Aleppo, Syria, to a Syrian father and a Palestinian mother. In 2013, Ghazal established her YouTube channel, HaylaTV, when she was 18 years old, initially as part of her dream to become a television presenter. In a 2016 interview with The National, she stated that she wanted to be a presenter from the age of eight years old. Initially her channel was English-language, but after she switched to creating content in Arabic in 2014, its popularity increased.

By the time she was 20, the channel had 1 million subscribers and 100 million views. At this point, half of her audience was Saudi Arabian, and the largest age bracket was 18-23. Two years later the channel had 3.1 million subscribers. By 2021, the channel had 9 million subscribers. Content on the channel includes make-up, style, and cookery. Other, especially early, videos explored limitations placed on women in the Arab world, using comedy to explore the topics.

In 2016, Ghazal was appointed a Change Ambassador for Goodwill for the United Nations, the only appointee from the Middle East. Other ambassadors included Ingrid Nilsen, Jackie Aina, and Taty Ferreira. The same year she met with Pope Francis with 11 other bloggers, including English beauty blogger Louise Pentland and Mexican-American blogger Dulce Candy. In the meeting, the Pope encouraged the group to "help those of their followers who feel lost". In 2017, she paused content production to focus on her education. In the same year, Enab Baladi featured her work as part of a growing body of online Syrian comedy. She also worked with Unilever as a judge in a "vlogging" competition with a $35,000 prize, aimed at women in the Middle East; her co-judges included YouTubers Alanoud Badr (ar), Haifa Beseisso and Mimi.

== Personal life ==
Ghazal lives in Dubai. She has a BA in Business Marketing from the American University in Dubai. She runs two boutiques in Dubai, under the name Hayla Couture. She is also a certified mental health practitioner and life coach.

== Honours ==
- Forbes Top 10 Arab Women Social Media Influencers.
- 100 Most Inspirational People in the Emirate Dubai
- Arab Women's Award for the New Media Category (2016)
- 100 Most Influential Arab Youth in the World Under 40 (2016)
