= List of Formula E champions =

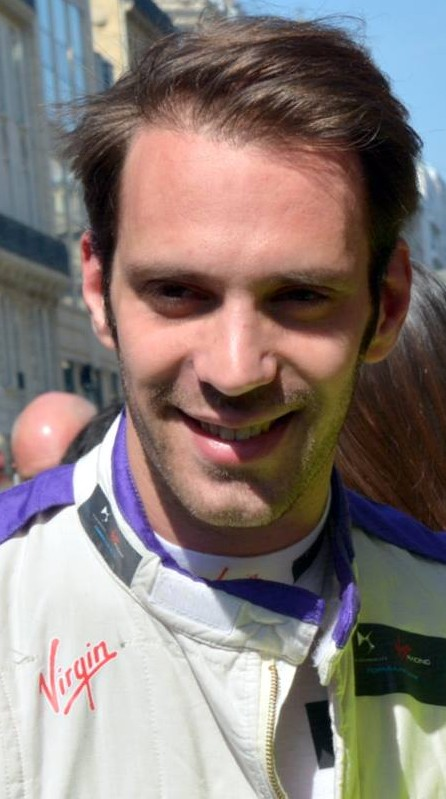
Jean-Éric Vergne was the first driver to win the Formula E Drivers' Championship more than once.

Formula E is a single-seater motorsport championship that uses only electric cars. The series is promoted and owned by Formula E Holdings and administered by the global governing body of motorsport, the Fédération Internationale de l'Automobile (FIA), since its inception in 2014. The Formula E season consists of a series of races, known as ePrix, held usually in city centres, and in a few cases on permanent racing circuits. Points are awarded based on individual race results as well as for earning pole position in qualifying, setting the fastest lap in the group stage, and fastest lap during the race, with the highest tally of points winning the respective championship or trophy.

The two main awards in the series are the Drivers' Championship and the Teams' Championship. A driver and team secures the Championship each season when it is no longer mathematically possible for another driver and team to beat them no matter the outcome of the remaining races, although it is not officially awarded until the FIA Prize Giving Ceremony that is held after the season has ended.

As of the 2025–26 season, out of the eighty-nine drivers who have started an ePrix, there have been ten Formula E Drivers' Champions. The first Formula E Drivers' Champion was Nelson Piquet Jr. in the 2014–15 season and the current title holder is Pascal Wehrlein in the 2025–26 season. Jean-Éric Vergne and Pascal Wehrlein have achieved the title on two occasions, while the other eight Drivers' Champions have won the title just once. It has been won by drivers from both Brazil and United Kingdom twice between two drivers, followed by France and Germany both with two championships from a single driver, . The Drivers' Championship has been claimed in the final race of the season eight times in the twelve seasons it has been awarded. Out of the 17 teams that have entered an ePrix, six have won the Teams' Championship. Renault e.Dams holds the record for the highest number of Teams' Championship victories, having won the title on three occasions. German teams have won the title four times between three teams, French squads have earned the accolade three times between one team, and British teams have won the title three times between two teams.

== Drivers ==
=== Championship ===
Drivers' Champions by season
Season	Driver	Team	Chassis	Powertrain	Tyre	Poles	Wins	Podiums	F/laps	Points	Clinched	Margin	Ref(s)
2014–15	(Brazil) Nelson Piquet Jr.	China Racing / NEXTEV TCR	Spark-Renault SRT 01E	Renault SRT01-e	M	0	2	5	2	144	Race 11 of 11	1	
2015–16	(Switzerland) Sébastien Buemi	(France) Renault e.dams	Spark SRT01-e	Renault Z.E 15	M	3	3	6	5	155	Race 10 of 10	2	
2016–17	(Brazil) Lucas di Grassi	(Germany) Abt Schaeffler Audi Sport	Spark SRT01-e	Abt Schaeffler FE02	M	3	2	7	0	181	Race 12 of 12	24	
2017–18	(France) Jean-Éric Vergne	(China) Techeetah	Spark SRT01-e	Renault Z.E 17	M	4	4	6	0	198	Race 11 of 12	54	
2018–19	(France) Jean-Éric Vergne	(China) DS Techeetah	Spark SRT05e	DS E-Tense FE 19	M	1	3	5	1	136	Race 13 of 13	17	
2019–20	(Portugal) António Félix da Costa	(China) DS Techeetah	Spark SRT05e	DS E-Tense FE 20	M	3	3	6	4	158	Race 9 of 11	71	
2020–21	(Netherlands) Nyck de Vries	(Germany) Mercedes-EQ Formula E Team	Spark SRT05e	Mercedes-EQ Silver Arrow 02	M	1	2	4	1	99	Race 15 of 15	7	
2021–22	(Belgium) Stoffel Vandoorne	(Germany) Mercedes-EQ Formula E Team	Spark SRT05e	Mercedes-EQ Silver Arrow 02	M	2	1	8	1	213	Race 16 of 16	33	
2022–23	(United Kingdom) Jake Dennis	(United States) Avalanche Andretti Formula E	Spark Gen3	Porsche 99X Electric	H	2	2	11	5	229	Race 15 of 16	30	
2023–24	(Germany) Pascal Wehrlein	(Germany) TAG Heuer Porsche Formula E Team	Spark Gen3	Porsche 99X Electric	H	3	3	5	1	198	Race 16 of 16	6	
2024–25	(United Kingdom) Oliver Rowland	(Japan) Nissan Formula E Team	Spark Gen3 Evo	Nissan e-4ORCE 05	H	3	4	8	0	184	Race 14 of 16	29	
2025–26	(Germany) Pascal Wehrlein	(Germany) Porsche Formula E Team	Spark Gen3 Evo	Porsche 99X Electric	H	4	3	6	1	169	Race 17 of 17	5	
2026–27			Formula E Gen4		B								

=== By country ===
Drivers' Champions by country
Country	Titles	Drivers	Drivers (Titles)
Brazil	2	2	Nelson Piquet Jr. (1), Lucas di Grassi (1)
United Kingdom	2	2	Jake Dennis (1), Oliver Rowland (1)
France	2	1	Jean-Éric Vergne (2)
Germany	2	1	Pascal Wehrlein (2)
Switzerland	1	1	Sébastien Buemi (1)
Portugal	1	1	António Félix da Costa (1)
Netherlands	1	1	Nyck de Vries (1)
Belgium	1	1	Stoffel Vandoorne (1)

== Teams ==
=== Championship ===
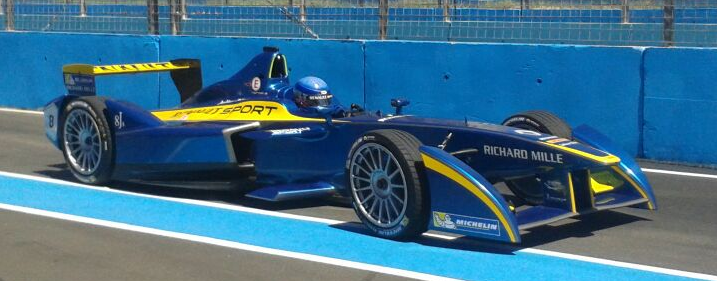
DAMS won the most Teams' Championship titles

Teams' Champions by season
Season	Team	Chassis	Powertrain	Tyre	Poles	Wins	Podiums	F/laps	Points	Clinched	Margin	Ref
2014–15	(France) Renault e.dams	Spark-Renault SRT 01E	Renault SRT01-e	M	5	2	5	2	182	Race 10 of 11	11	
2015–16	(France) Renault e.dams	Spark SRT01-e	Renault Z.E 15	M	4	5	9	6	270	Race 10 of 10	49	
2016–17	(France) Renault e.dams	Spark SRT01-e	Renault Z.E 16	M	2	6	6	2	268	Race 12 of 12	20	
2017–18	(Germany) Audi Sport Abt Schaeffler	Spark SRT01-e	Audi e-tron FE04	M	1	4	11	6	264	Race 12 of 12	2	
2018–19	(China) DS Techeetah	Spark SRT05e	DS E-Tense FE 19	M	2	3	7	2	222	Race 13 of 13	19	
2019–20	(China) DS Techeetah	Spark SRT05e	DS E-Tense FE 20	M	5	3	9	4	244	Race 9 of 11	77	
2020–21	(Germany) Mercedes-EQ Formula E Team	Spark SRT05e	Mercedes-EQ Silver Arrow 02	M	4	3	7	2	181	Race 15 of 15	4	
2021–22	(Germany) Mercedes-EQ Formula E Team	Spark SRT05e	Mercedes-EQ Silver Arrow 02	M	3	3	11	2	319	Race 16 of 16	24	
2022–23	(United Kingdom) Envision Racing	Spark Gen3	Jaguar I-Type 6	H	3	4	9	2	304	Race 16 of 16	12	
2023–24	(United Kingdom) Jaguar TCS Racing	Spark Gen3	Jaguar I-Type 6	H	4	4	14	7	368	Race 16 of 16	36	
2024–25	(Germany) TAG Heuer Porsche	Spark Gen3 Evo	Porsche 99X Electric	H	3	1	10	4	256	Race 16 of 16	29	
2025–26	(United Kingdom) Jaguar TCS Racing	Spark Gen3 Evo	Jaguar I-Type 7	H	0	4	10	0	288	Race 17 of 17	17	

=== By racing license ===
Teams' Champions by racing license
License	Titles	Teams	Team (Title)
Germany	4	3	Mercedes-EQ (2), Abt Sportsline (1), Porsche (1)
France	3	1	Renault e.dams (3)
United Kingdom	3	2	Jaguar (2), Envision (1)
China	2	1	Techeetah (2)

=== By powertrain manufacturer ===
Manufacturer	Titles	Season(s)
(France) Renault	3	2014–15, 2015–16, 2016–17
(United Kingdom) Jaguar	3	2022–23, 2023–24, 2025–26
(France) DS Automobiles	2	2018–19, 2019–20
(Germany) Mercedes-EQ	2	2020–21, 2021–22
(Germany) Audi	1	2017–18
(Germany) Porsche	1	2024–25

== Manufacturers ==
The Manufacturers' Trophy was introduced in the 2023–24 season. Each manufacturers' two-highest placed drivers in each race score points towards the championship.

Manufacturers' World Championship (Trophy) by season
Season	Manufacturer	Chassis	Powertrain	Poles	Wins	Podiums	F/laps	Points	Clinched	Margin
Manufacturers’ Trophy
2023–24	(United Kingdom) Jaguar	Spark Gen3	Jaguar I-Type 6	4	4	19	3	455	Race 16 of 16	4
Manufacturers’ World Championship
2024–25	(Germany) Porsche	Spark Gen3 Evo	Porsche 99x Electric	6	2	14	6	393	Race 16 of 16	33
2025–26	(Germany) Porsche	Spark Gen3 Evo	Porsche 99x Electric	10	7	18	7	498	Race 15 of 17	98

=== By racing license ===
Manufacturers' Trophy by racing license
License	Titles	Manufacturer
Germany	2	Porsche (2)
United Kingdom	1	Jaguar (1)

=== By powertrain manufacturer ===
Manufacturer	Titles	Season(s)
(Germany) Porsche	2	2024–25, 2025–26
(United Kingdom) Jaguar	1	2023–24

== Voestalpine European Races Trophy ==
The Voestalpine European Races Trophy was a 3D printed trophy presented to the best performing driver over the course of the five-race European leg of the 2018–19 season through the highest number of podium finishes and not their total points score.

Season	Driver	Team	Chassis	Powertrain	Poles	Wins	Podiums	F/laps	Clinched
2018–19	(France) Jean-Éric Vergne	(China) DS Techeetah	Spark SRT05e	DS E-Tense FE 19	1	2	3	0	Race 5 of 5

== Bibliography ==
- Smith, Sam (May 2021). Formula E: Racing for the Future. Sherborne, Dorset: Evro Publishing. ISBN 978-1-910505-68-7.
