= Oppenhuizen =

Oppenhuizen Toppenhuzen
- Village
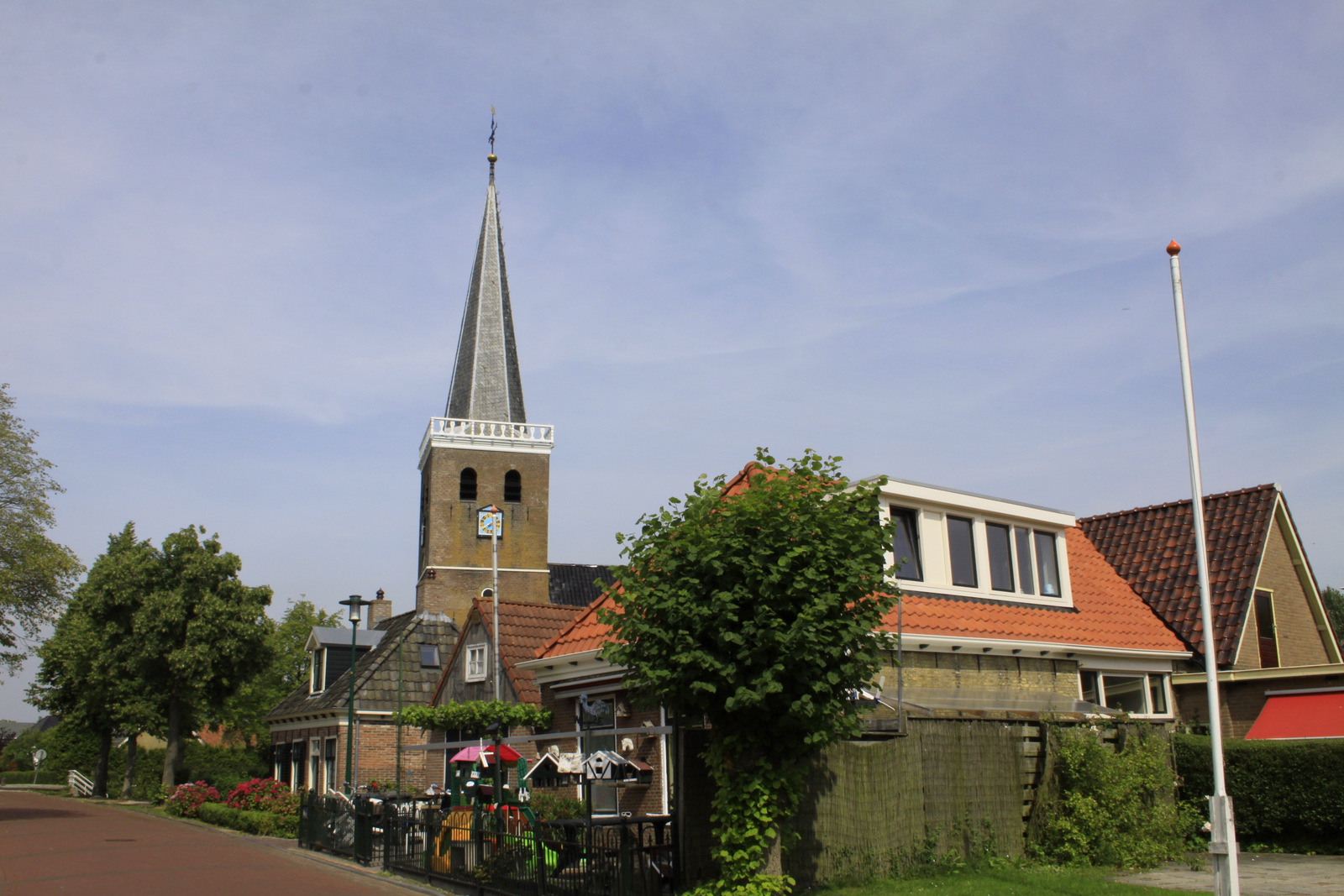

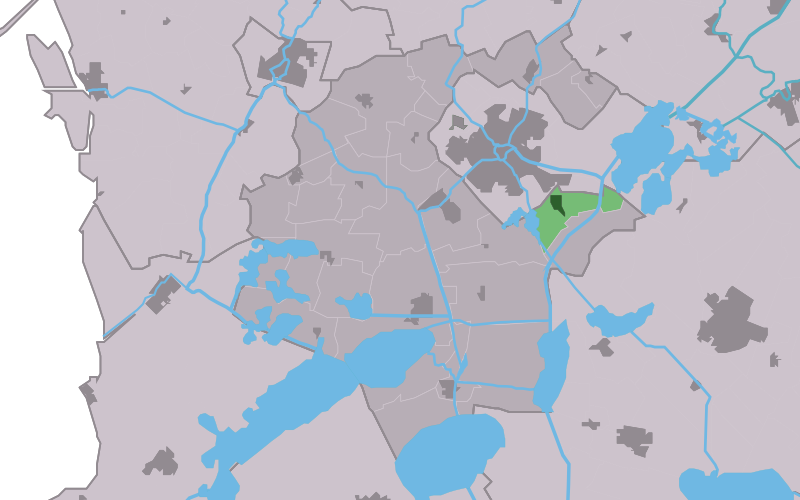
- Location in the former Wymbritseradiel municipality

- Location in the Netherlands Oppenhuizen (Netherlands)
- Country: Netherlands
- Province: Friesland
- Municipality: Súdwest-Fryslân

Area
  - Total: 4.46 km^{2} (1.72 sq mi)
- Elevation: 0.5 m (1.6 ft)

Population (2021)
  - Total: 1,075
  - Density: 241/km^{2} (624/sq mi)
- Time zone: UTC+1 (CET)
  - Summer (DST): UTC+2 (CEST)
- Postal code: 8625
- Dialing code: 0515

Oppenhuizen (West Frisian: Toppenhuzen) is a village in Súdwest-Fryslân municipality in the province of Friesland, the Netherlands. It had a population of around 1,065 in January 2017.

Oppenhuizen and adjacent Uitwellingerga (West Frisian: Twellingea) are "twin villages" together referred to as Top and Twel.

== History ==
The village was first mentioned in the 13th century as Upma(n)husum, and means "houses which are located stream upwards". Oppenhuizen is a canal village which developed around 1000.

The Dutch Reformed church was founded in 1695 by grietman (mayor/judge) D.G. Burmania, and was restored in 1834. In 1817, a tower was added to the church.

Oppenhuizen was home to 354 people in 1840. Between 1866 and 1868 the road to Sneek was built, and Oppenhuizen started to grow along the road, and became attached to Uitwellingerga. Before 2011, the village was part of the Wymbritseradiel municipality.

== National heritage sites in Oppenhuizen ==
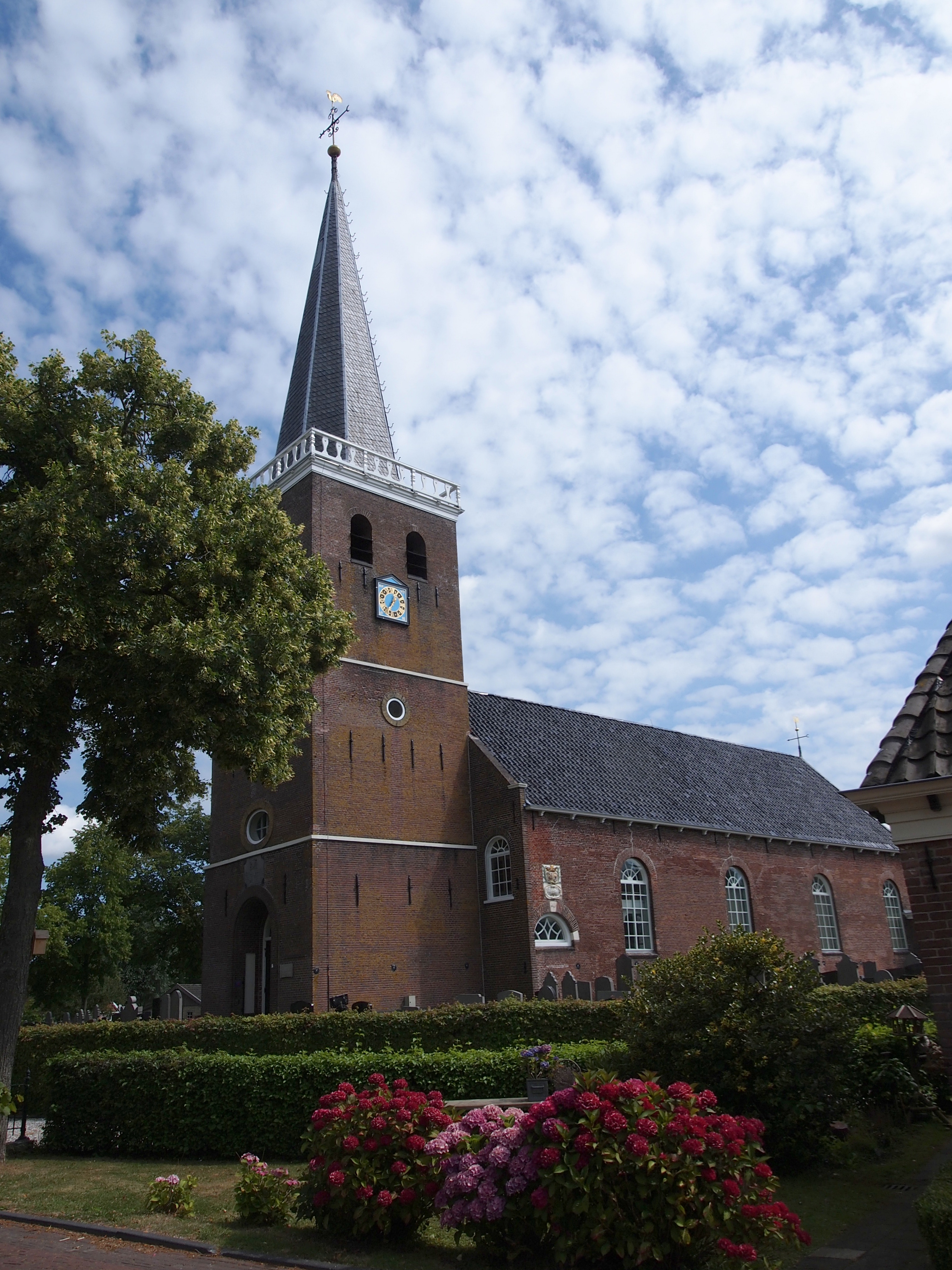
St. John's Church (2014)

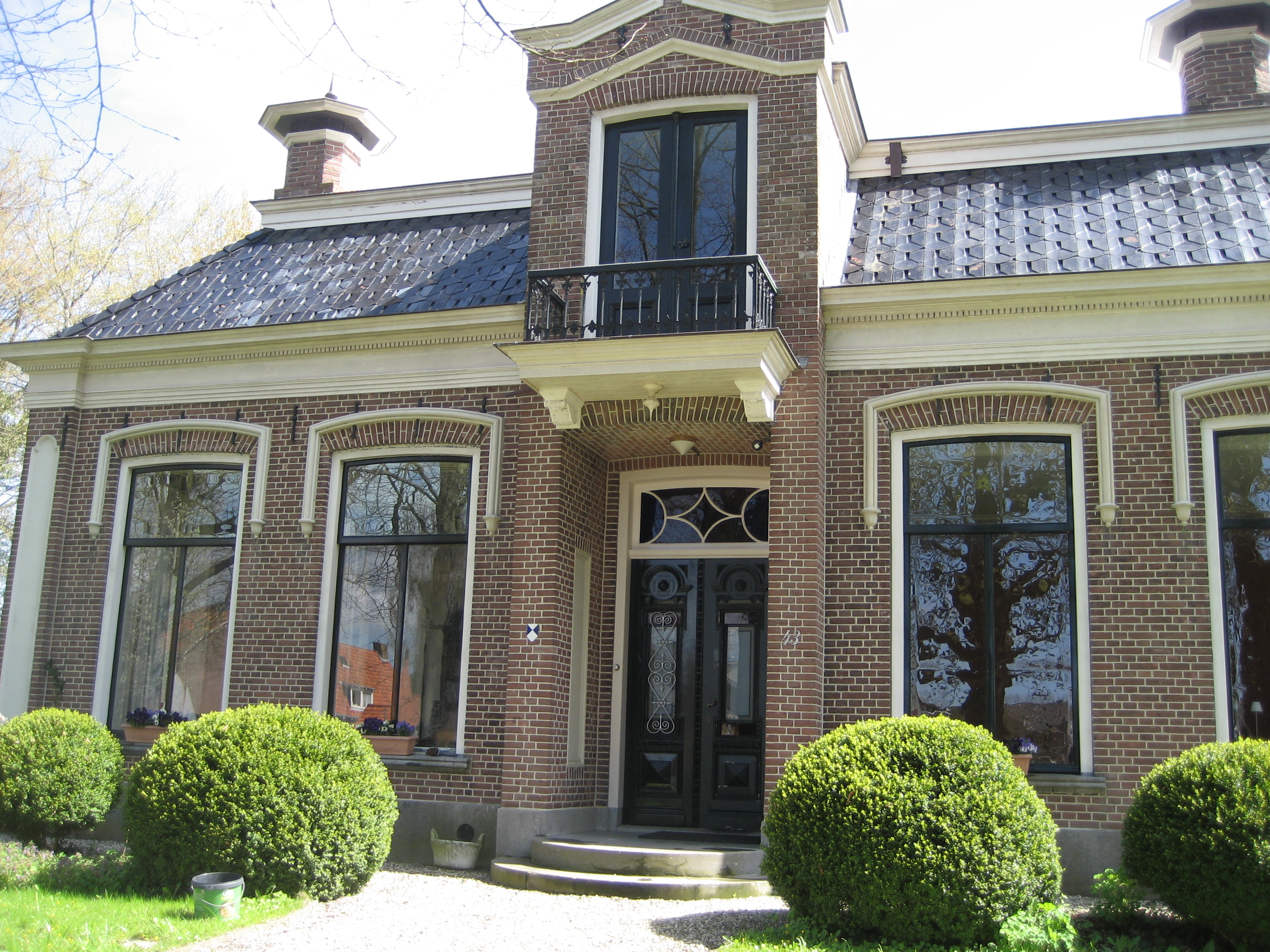
Former rectory of the Dutch Reformed Church

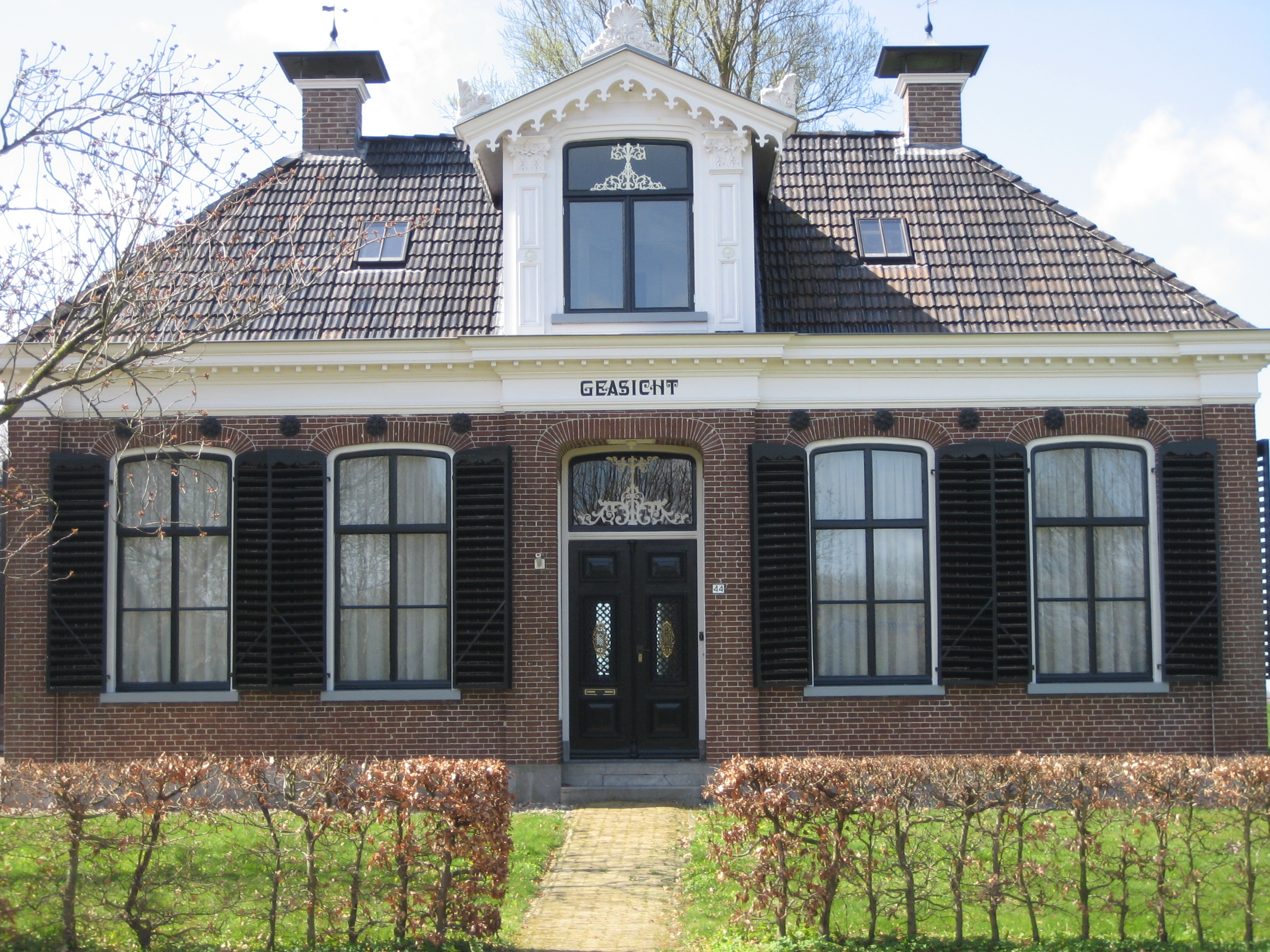
Geasicht

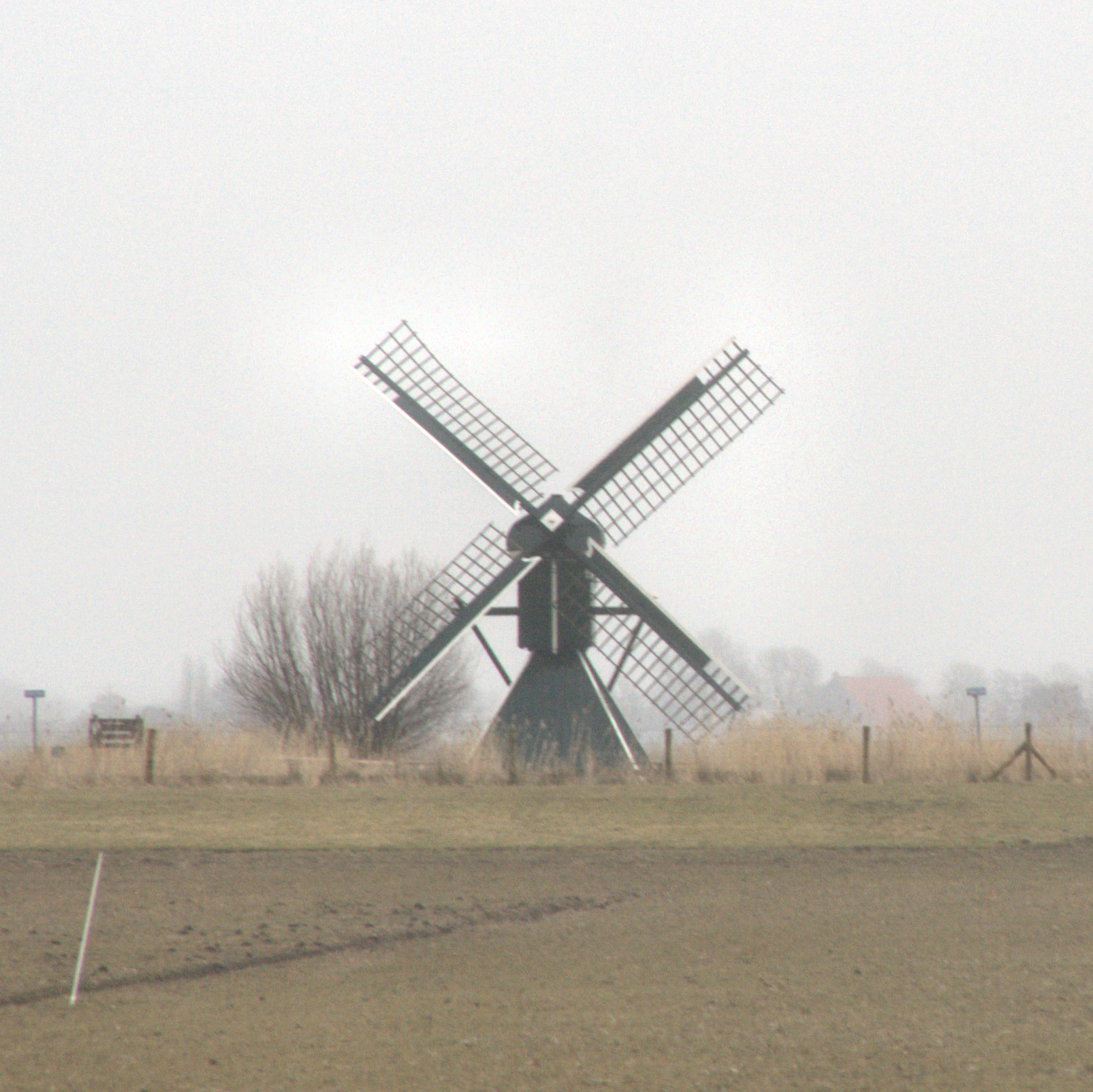
Mill (Geeuwpoldermolen)
