= Haifa bint Muhammad Al Saud =

Saudi royal and government official

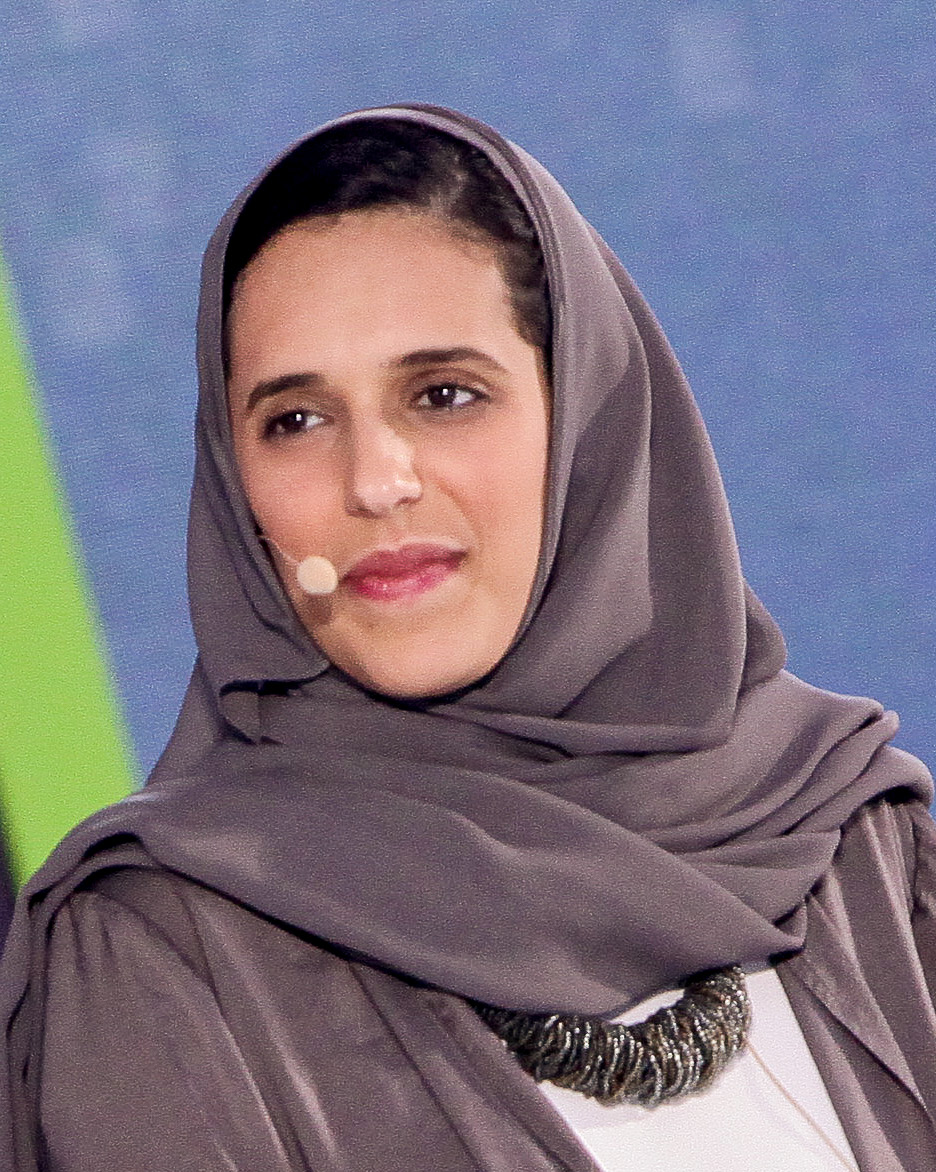

Deputy Minister of Tourism
- In office: 3 July 2022 – 12 February 2026
Names
- Her Royal Highness Princess Haifa Bint Muhammad Bin Saud Bin Khalid Bin Muhammad Bin Abdul Rahman
- House: Al Saud
- Father: Muhammad Bin Saud Al Saud
- Education: University of New Haven; London Business School

Her Royal Highness Princess Haifa Bint Muhammad Al Saud is a Saudi royal and politician. She is adviser at the General Secretariat of the Council of Ministers at the rank of minister. Since 2012 she has assumed various government posts including being deputy minister of tourism.

== Early life and education ==
Her Royal Highness Princess Haifa bint Muhammad is a member of the Al Saud family. Her father is the grandson of Khalid bin Muhammad Al Saud, the son of Muhammad bin Abdul Rahman Al Saud. She received a bachelor's degree in business administration from the University of New Haven in 2008. She also obtained a master's degree in business administration and management from London Business School, University of London, in 2017.

== Career ==
Following her graduation Her Royal Highness Princess Haifa bint Muhammad began to work at HSBC, United Kingdom, as an analyst of equity sales. She joined the Saudi ministry of higher education in 2012 where she served as a senior consultant. In the period between 2017 and 2019 she was the managing director at the General Sports Authority. In July 2018 she was appointed secretary-general of Formula E Holdings.

In January 2020 she was named as a board member of the General Authority of Civil Aviation (GACA). She represents the Saudi Commission for Tourism and National Heritage at the GACA. On 3 July 2022 she was appointed deputy minister of tourism where she had been serving as an assistant minister. In February 2026 she was relieved of her position as deputy minister of tourism and appointed adviser at the General Secretariat of the Council of Ministers at the rank of minister.

Her other posts include vice chairwoman of the Saudi Fencing Federation and chairwoman of the women’s committee at the Arab Fencing Federation.

Her Royal Highness Princess Haifa has contributed to the transforming Saudi Arabia's tourism ecosystem. This ecosystem now includes the Ministry of Tourism, Saudi Tourism Authority, Tourism Development Fund, Tourism Development Council, Air Connectivity Program, and Saudi Red Sea Authority. Additionally, she holds board memberships at Qiddiya Investment Company, Taif Development Authority, and AlAhsa Development Authority. Her roles included leading initiatives at the inaugural Formula E Diriyah ePrix and as Chair of the Saudi-Emirati Youth Council, where she significantly increased female participation within the Saudi Fencing Federation.[7]
