= Uitwellingerga =

Uitwellingerga Twellingea
- Village
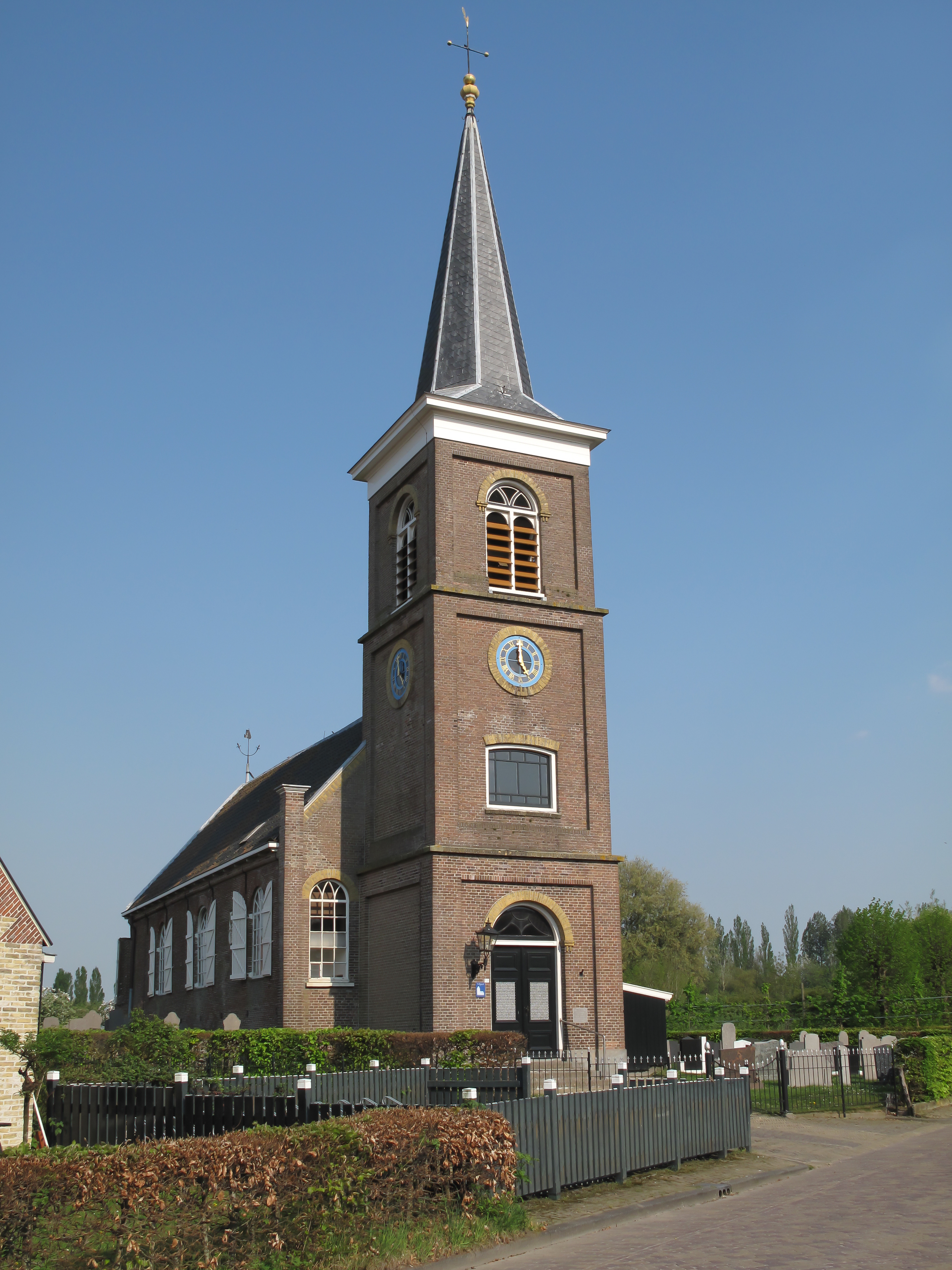
- Uitwellingerga, church

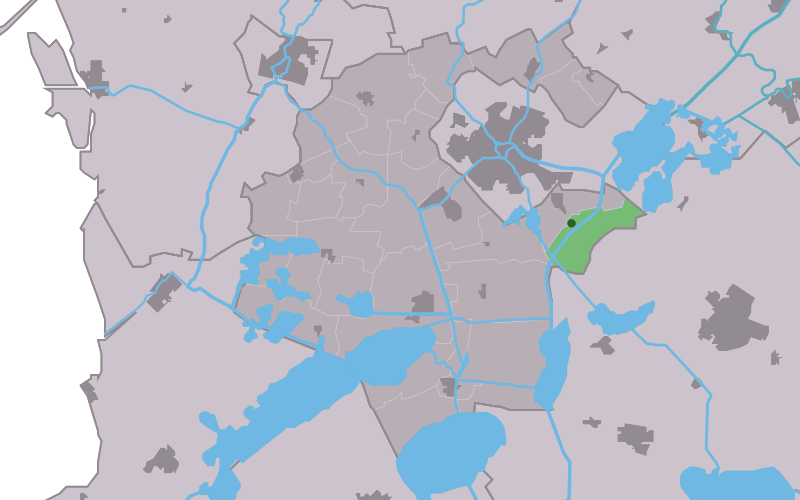
- Location in the former Wymbritseradiel municipality

- Location in the Netherlands Uitwellingerga (Netherlands)
- Country: Netherlands
- Province: Friesland
- Municipality: Súdwest-Fryslân

Area
  - Total: 0.82 km^{2} (0.32 sq mi)
- Elevation: −0.2 m (−0.66 ft)

Population (2021)
  - Total: 380
  - Density: 460/km^{2} (1,200/sq mi)
- Time zone: UTC+1 (CET)
  - Summer (DST): UTC+2 (CEST)
- Postal code: 8624
- Dialing code: 0515

Uitwellingerga (West Frisian: Twellingea) is a village in Súdwest-Fryslân municipality in the province of Friesland, the Netherlands. It had a population of around 355 in January 2017.

Uitwellingerga and adjacent Oppenhuizen (West Frisian: Toppenhuzen) are "twin villages" together referred to as Top and Twel.

== History ==
It was first mentioned in 1328 as Wolprandeskerke. The etymology of the current name is unclear. Uitwellingerga is a canal village from around 1000.

The Dutch Reformed church was built in 1690 probably on the foundation of an earlier church. In 1873, the tower was replaced.

Uitwellingerga was home to 262 people in 1840. Between 1866 and 1868, the road to Sneek was built and the village expanded along the road. In 1902, a dairy factory was built in Uitwellingerga in Renaissance Revival style.

Before 2011, the village was part of the Wymbritseradiel municipality.

== Notable people ==
- Arjen Visserman (born 1965), Olympic athlete
- Yvonne Nauta (born 1991), speedskater
- Nyck de Vries (born 1995), racing driver
