= Nyck de Vries =

Dutch racing driver (born 1995)

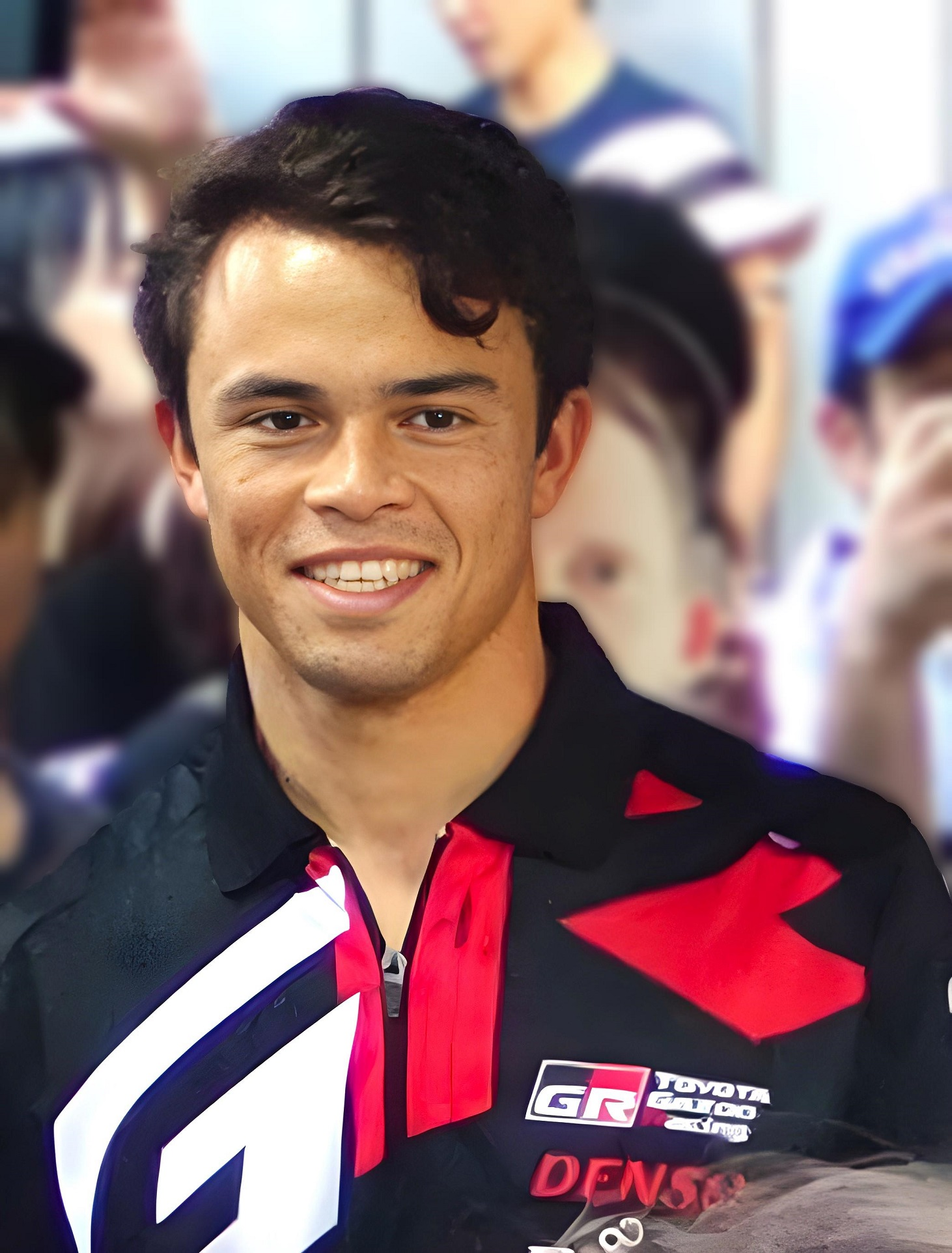
- De Vries at the 2024 6 Hours of Fuji
- Born: Hendrik Johannes Nicasius de Vries; 6 February 1995 (age 31); Uitwellingerga, Friesland, Netherlands

Formula E career
- Debut season: 2019–20
- Current team: Mahindra
- Categorisation: FIA Gold (2017–2019); FIA Platinum (2020–)
- Car number: 17 (2019–2022); 21 (2023–present)
- Former teams: Mercedes
- Starts: 70
- Championships: 1 (2020–21)
- Wins: 6
- Podiums: 16
- Poles: 2
- Fastest laps: 3
- Finished last season: 7th (115 pts)
- Statistics up to date as of 1 November 2026.

FIA World Endurance Championship career
- Debut season: 2018–19
- Current team: Toyota
- Car number: 7
- Former teams: Nederland, G-Drive
- Starts: 38
- Championships: 0
- Wins: 4
- Podiums: 10
- Poles: 2
- Fastest laps: 6
- Best finish: 3rd in 2024 (Hypercar)

Formula One World Championship career
- Nationality: (Netherlands) Dutch
- Active years: 2022–2023
- Team(s): Williams, AlphaTauri
- Car number: 21 (Note: De Vries selected the number 21 as his personal driver number, per FIA regulations; at the 2022 Italian Grand Prix, he competed using the standard reserve number 45 for Williams.)
- Entries: 11
- Championships: 0
- Wins: 0
- Podiums: 0
- Career points: 2
- Pole positions: 0
- Fastest laps: 0
- First entry: 2022 Italian Grand Prix
- Last entry: 2023 British Grand Prix

24 Hours of Le Mans career
- Years: 2018–2019, 2024–2026
- Teams: Team Nederland, G-Drive, TDS, Toyota
- Best finish: 1st (2026)
- Class wins: 1

Previous series
- 2017–2019; 2016; 2015; 2013–2014; 2012–2014; 2012: FIA Formula 2; GP3 Series; Formula Renault 3.5; Formula Renault 2.0 Alps; Formula Renault Eurocup; Formula Renault NEC

Championship titles
- 2019; 2014; 2014: FIA Formula 2; Formula Renault Eurocup; Formula Renault 2.0 Alps

Hendrik Johannes Nicasius "Nyck" de Vries (Dutch pronunciation: [ˈnɪɡ də ˈvris]; born 6 February 1995) is a Dutch racing driver who competes in the FIA World Endurance Championship for Toyota and in Formula E for Mahindra. In formula racing, De Vries competed in Formula One at 11 Grands Prix from 2022 to 2023, and won the 2020–21 Formula E World Championship with Mercedes. In endurance racing, De Vries won the 24 Hours of Le Mans in 2026 with Toyota.

Born and raised in Uitwellingerga, De Vries began competitive kart racing aged nine. After a successful karting career—culminating in back-to-back victories at the senior World Championship in 2010 and 2011—De Vries graduated to junior formulae. Signed to the McLaren Young Driver Programme from 2010 to 2019, de Vries won his first championship at the Formula Renault Eurocup in 2014 with Koiranen. He finished third in the 2015 Formula Renault 3.5 Series before winning multiple races in the 2016 GP3 Series. De Vries progressed to FIA Formula 2 for its inaugural 2017 season, winning the title in his third season, driving for ART. De Vries graduated to sportscar racing that year, competing in the LMP2 class of the FIA World Endurance Championship with Nederland. He took his first class win the following season at Fuji, before joining Formula E with the recently established Mercedes team in 2019. In his second season, de Vries took multiple victories as he won his maiden World Championship. Alongside his successes in Formula E, De Vries also became a race-winner in the European Le Mans Series with G-Drive in 2020 and 2021.

A test and reserve driver for Williams, Mercedes, McLaren and Aston Martin, de Vries made his Formula One debut with the former at the 2022 Italian Grand Prix, as a substitute for Alexander Albon. After scoring a points finish on his debut, he joined AlphaTauri for 2023 but was replaced by Daniel Ricciardo after ten rounds. De Vries moved back to Formula E with Mahindra for his 2023–24 campaign, and signed for Toyota in the Hypercar class of WEC in 2024, winning the 6 Hours of Imola. He has served as a test driver and simulator driver for McLaren in Formula One since 2025.

== Early and personal life ==
Hendrik Johannes Nicasius de Vries was born on 6 February 1995 in Uitwellingerga, Friesland, Netherlands. De Vries has partial Indonesian ancestry, with his grandfather hailing from Malang, East Java.

== Junior racing career ==
=== Karting ===
In 2008, de Vries won the WSK World Series for the KF3 category, as well as the German Junior Championship. In 2009, he retained both his German Junior and WSK World Series titles, as well as winning the European KF3 Championship. In September, he won the 2010 Karting World Championship. He also won the World Championship in 2011.

=== Formula Renault Eurocup ===
==== 2012 ====
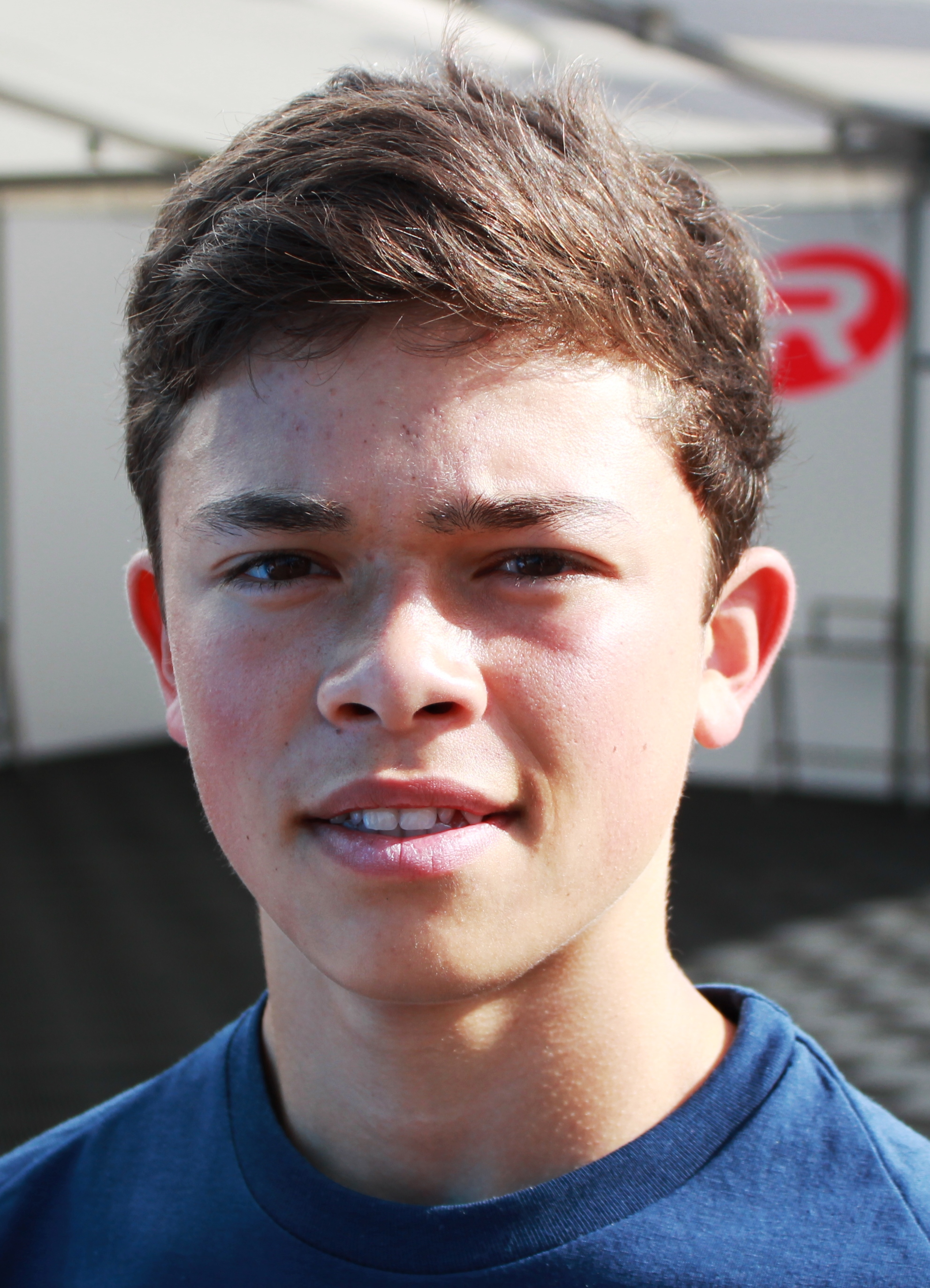
De Vries in 2012

In 2012, de Vries switched to single-seaters, being given a cockpit in the Eurocup Formula Renault 2.0 at R-ace GP. De Vries achieved his first podium finish at his debut race in Alcañiz with a second place, and he managed to repeat this result at the Hungaroring. De Vries finished the season in fifth place, beating all of his teammates. In addition, de Vries took part in several races of the Formula Renault 2.0 NEC, in which he managed a victory at his home track in Assen. He was on the podium four times in eleven starts in the series and ended up tenth in the drivers' standings.

==== 2013 ====
The following year, de Vries switched to Koiranen GP for his second season in the series. He won one race each at the Hungaroring and the Circuit de Catalunya and again ended the season in fifth place in the championship.

==== 2014 ====
In 2014, de Vries stayed with Koiranen and competed in his third season of the Eurocup. He won six races and finished on the podium in eleven of fourteen races. With 254 points to 124, he convincingly beat the runner-up Dennis Olsen in the championship. In addition, he took part in the entire Alpine Formula Renault season. He won ten out of fourteen races and only failed to make the podium twice.

=== Formula Renault 3.5 Series ===
In 2015, de Vries made the switch to the Formula Renault 3.5 Series, racing for DAMS. He was on the podium five times before winning the final race of the season at the Circuito de Jerez, putting him third in the final standings with 160 points, only placing behind Oliver Rowland and Matthieu Vaxivière.

=== GP3 Series ===
De Vries took part in the GP3 Series in 2016 in with ART Grand Prix. He scored his first podium at the Red Bull Ring with a third place, then obtained his first pole in Budapest. It wasn't until the second race at Monza that he took his first win, a result he replicated at the Yas Marina Circuit at the end of the season. He finished sixth in the championship, behind his teammates Charles Leclerc and Alexander Albon, who became champion and vice-champion respectively.

=== FIA Formula 2 Championship ===
==== 2017 ====
In 2017, de Vries switched to the FIA Formula 2 Championship with Rapax. He achieved his first win in the Monte Carlo sprint race and scored a further three podium finishes before the summer break. Before the round at Spa-Francorchamps, de Vries switched to Racing Engineering, with whom he scored a second place at that very round. He ended his season seventh in the championship, placing second-highest of all rookies.

==== 2018 ====
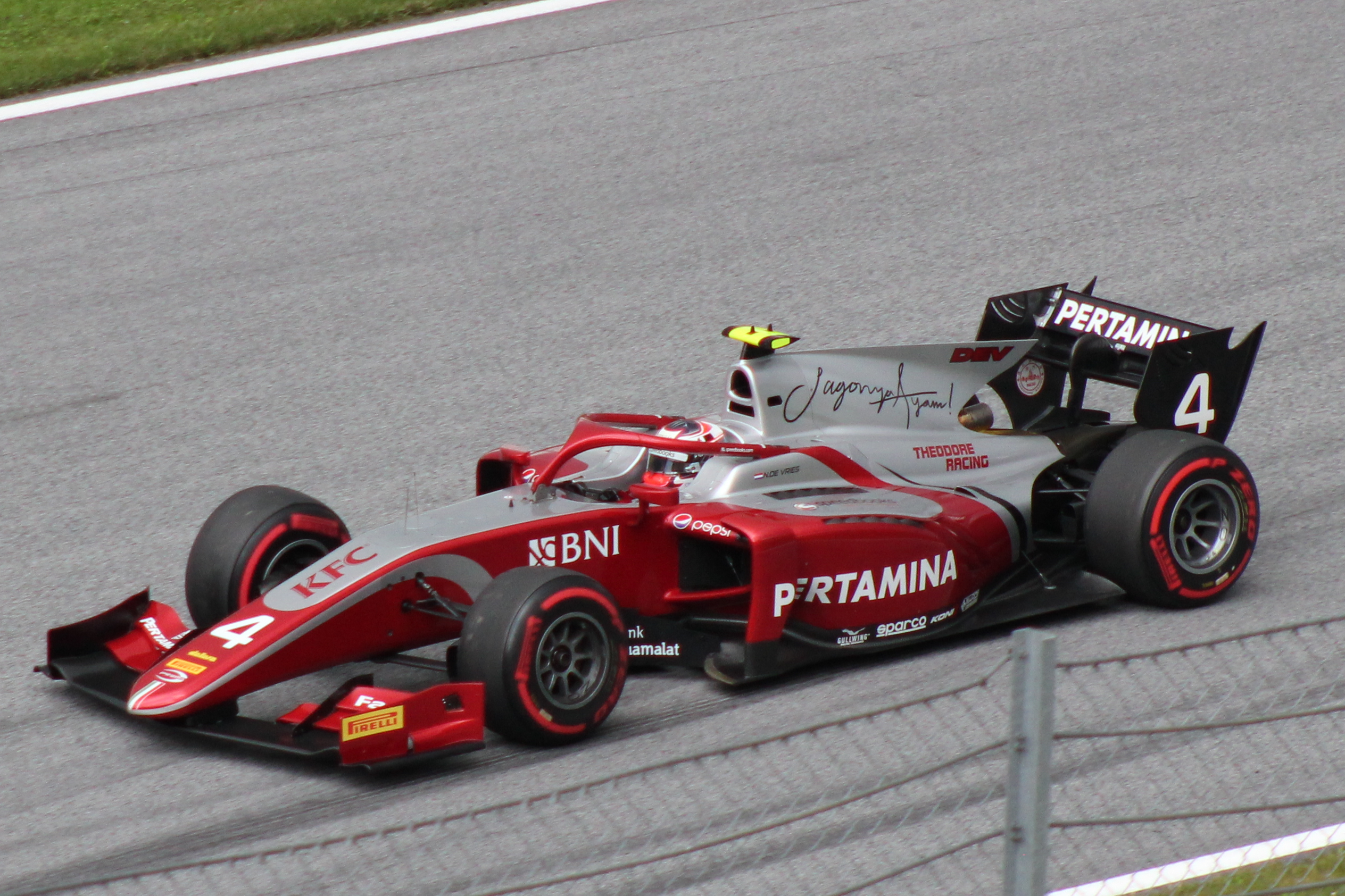
De Vries at the Red Bull Ring during the 2018 FIA Formula 2 Championship

For the 2018 season, de Vries moved to partner Sean Gelael at Prema Racing. His season started slowly with just two podiums from the opening third of the season putting him a fair way behind his title rivals. De Vries's first victory of the campaign in the sprint race at Le Castellet was followed by a point-less round in Austria and two finishes outside the top five in Silverstone. Following that however, de Vries's form improved, winning the feature races in Hungary and Belgium respectively. However, even with his sixth podium of the season in the Sochi feature race, de Vries was unable to finish in the top-three in the standings, being beaten by Alex Albon, Lando Norris and George Russell by ten, seventeen and 85 points respectively.

==== 2019 ====
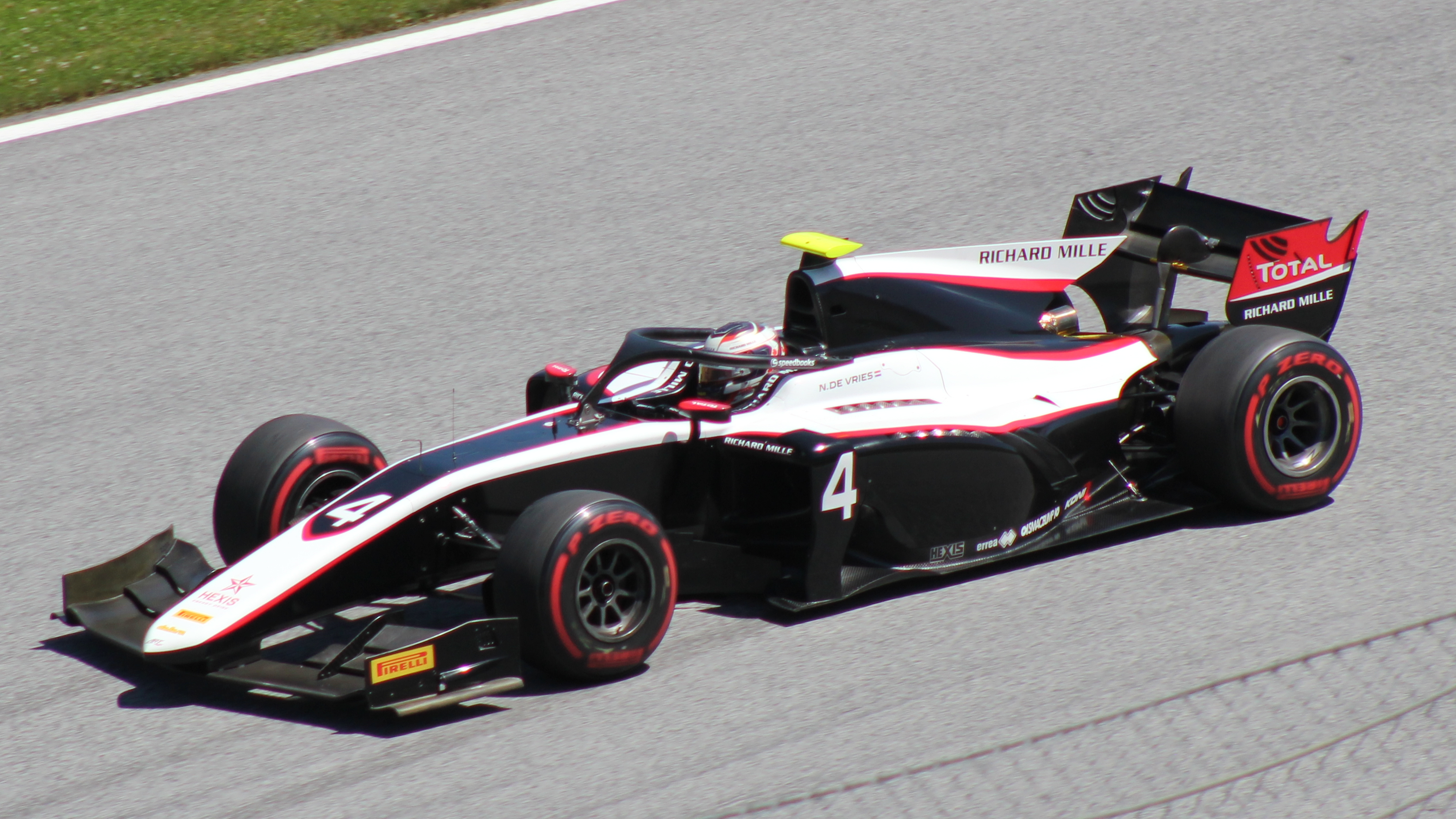
De Vries at the 2019 Spielberg Formula 2 round with ART Grand Prix

In 2019, de Vries remained in Formula 2, returning to his former team ART Grand Prix alongside 2018 GP3 vice-champion Nikita Mazepin. His season started in strong fashion with a podium in Baku and a sprint race victory in Barcelona. He followed that up with a win from pole position in Monaco and took the championship lead by winning the main race at Le Castellet. A pair of third places at the Red Bull Ring and a podium each in Silverstone and Budapest extended de Vries's advantage, and following another pair of thirds in Monza he had put one hand onto the trophy. After his fourth and final victory of the season, which came at the penultimate round in Sochi, de Vries was mathematically crowned Formula 2 champion.

== Sportscar racing career ==
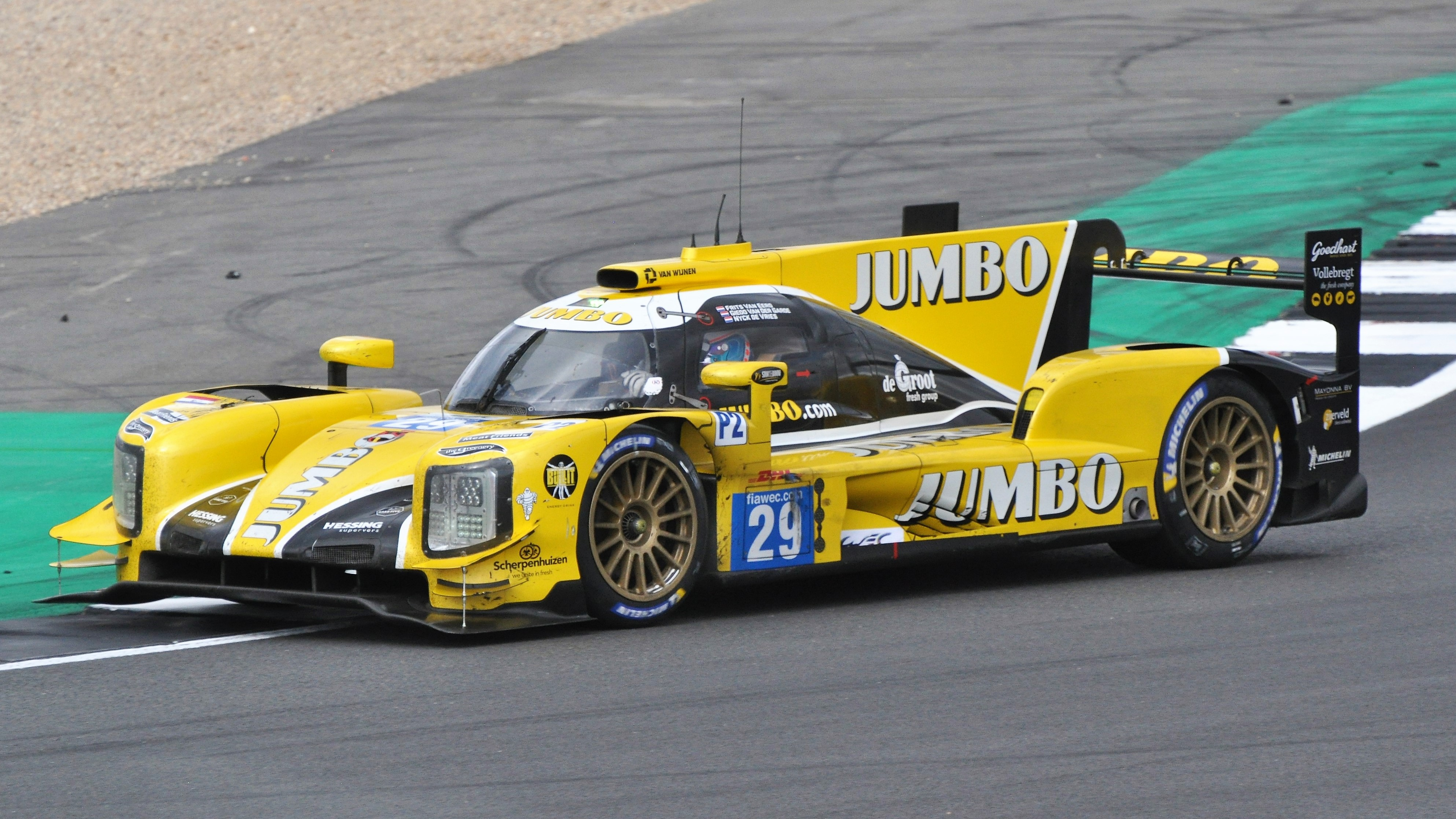
De Vries at the 2018 6 Hours of Silverstone

On 15 March 2018, de Vries signed for Racing Team Nederland to compete in the LMP2 class of the FIA World Endurance Championship. He later remained with the team for the 2019–20 season, partnering Giedo van der Garde and bronze-ranked Frits van Eerd. De Vries and his teammates won the 6 Hours of Fuji, thus taking the team's first win in the series. This result helped Racing Team Nederland to end up fourth in the LMP2 standings.

On 6 July 2020, de Vries was announced as the Toyota Gazoo Racing Europe GmbH test and reserve driver. His roles include testing the Toyota TS050 Hybrid and Toyota's hypercar. The same year saw him competing in three rounds of the European Le Mans Series with G-Drive Racing, scoring a podium and fastest lap combo at Le Castellet and winning the season finale at the Algarve.

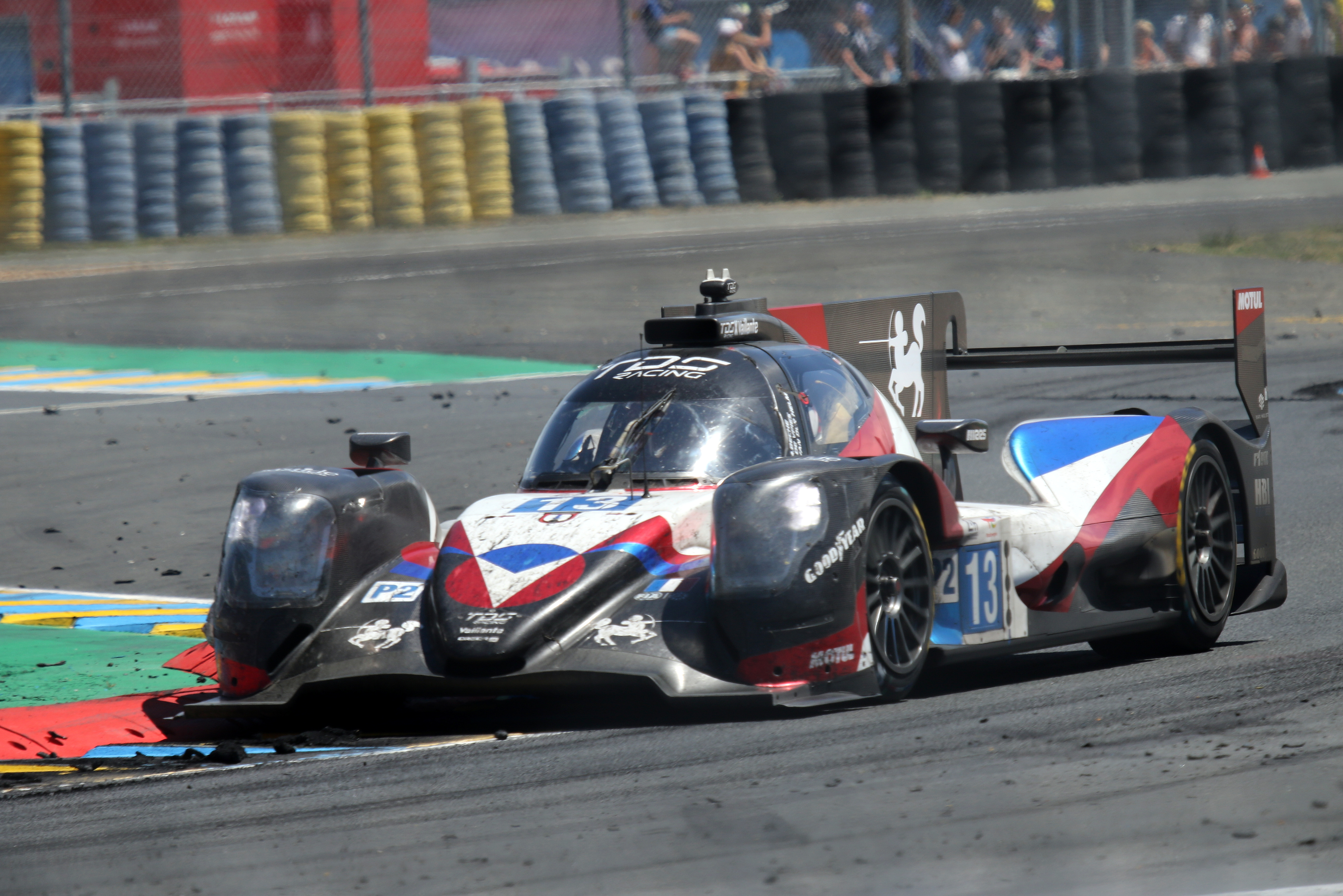
De Vries driving at the 2022 24 Hours of Le Mans

During the test week prior to the 2022 24 Hours of Le Mans the ACO officials prohibited TDS Racing x Vaillante driver Philippe Cimadomo from starting. Due to his reserve role for the Toyota Hypercar team, de Vries was already at the circuit and was asked to step in. De Vries ended up finishing fourth in class alongside Mathias Beche and Tijmen van der Helm, setting the fastest top 20 average laptime.

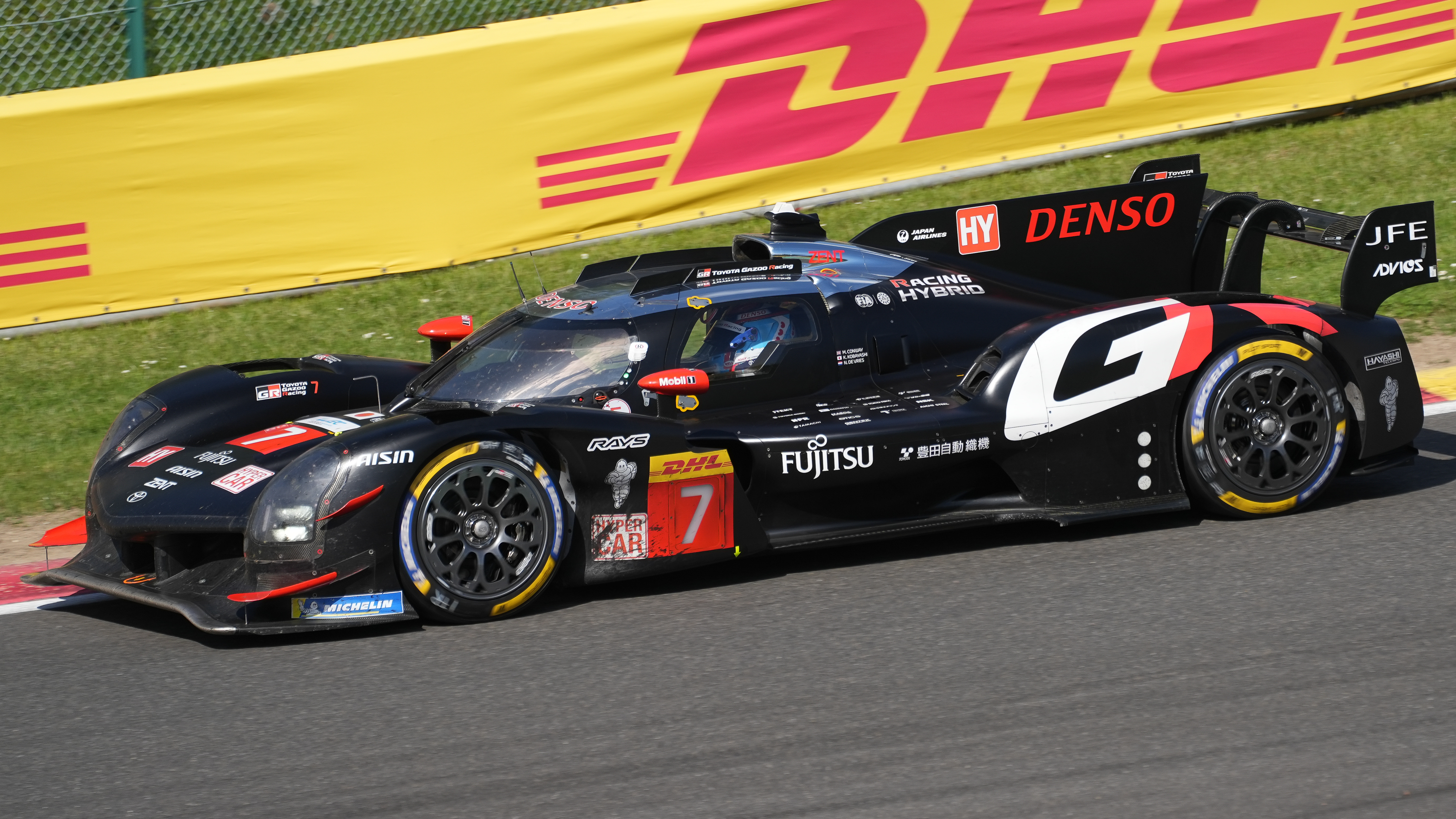
De Vries driving the GR010 Hybrid at the 2024 6 Hours of Spa-Francorchamps

On 20 November 2023, de Vries was announced as one of the primary drivers for the No. 7 Toyota Gazoo Racing Hypercar, replacing the outgoing José María López. Having qualified second for the season-opening race in Qatar, de Vries managed to take his first overall WEC victory at Imola, profiting from an impressive stint by veteran teammate Kamui Kobayashi. de Vries would finish second overall at Le Mans taking his first podium at Le Mans.

== Formula E career ==
=== Mercedes-EQ (2019–2022) ===
==== 2019–20 season ====
Near the end of 2019, de Vries was announced as a driver for the new Mercedes-Benz EQ Formula E Team for the 2019–20 Formula E season alongside Stoffel Vandoorne, having failed to find a seat in F1. De Vries scored a single podium, finishing second behind his teammate at the final Berlin ePrix race, to end up 11th overall with 60 points.

==== 2020–21 season ====
For the 2020–21 season, de Vries continued at the renamed Mercedes-EQ Formula E Team with Stoffel Vandoorne. He qualified on pole for the first race of the season-opening Diriyah ePrix double-header, proceeding to lead every lap en route to his first-ever victory in the series. Before the second race, de Vries did not take part in qualifying as Mercedes and Venturi Racing, who were both using Mercedes powertrains, were suspended from the session following the crash of Edoardo Mortara during a practice start procedure. In the race, he finished ninth after penalties were issued to multiple cars. At the round in Rome, de Vries failed to score points in both races, having collided with his teammate Vandoorne and Sam Bird respectively in the two races. De Vries achieved his second victory of the season in Valencia, where he was one of the only drivers to not run out of usable energy before the end of the race.

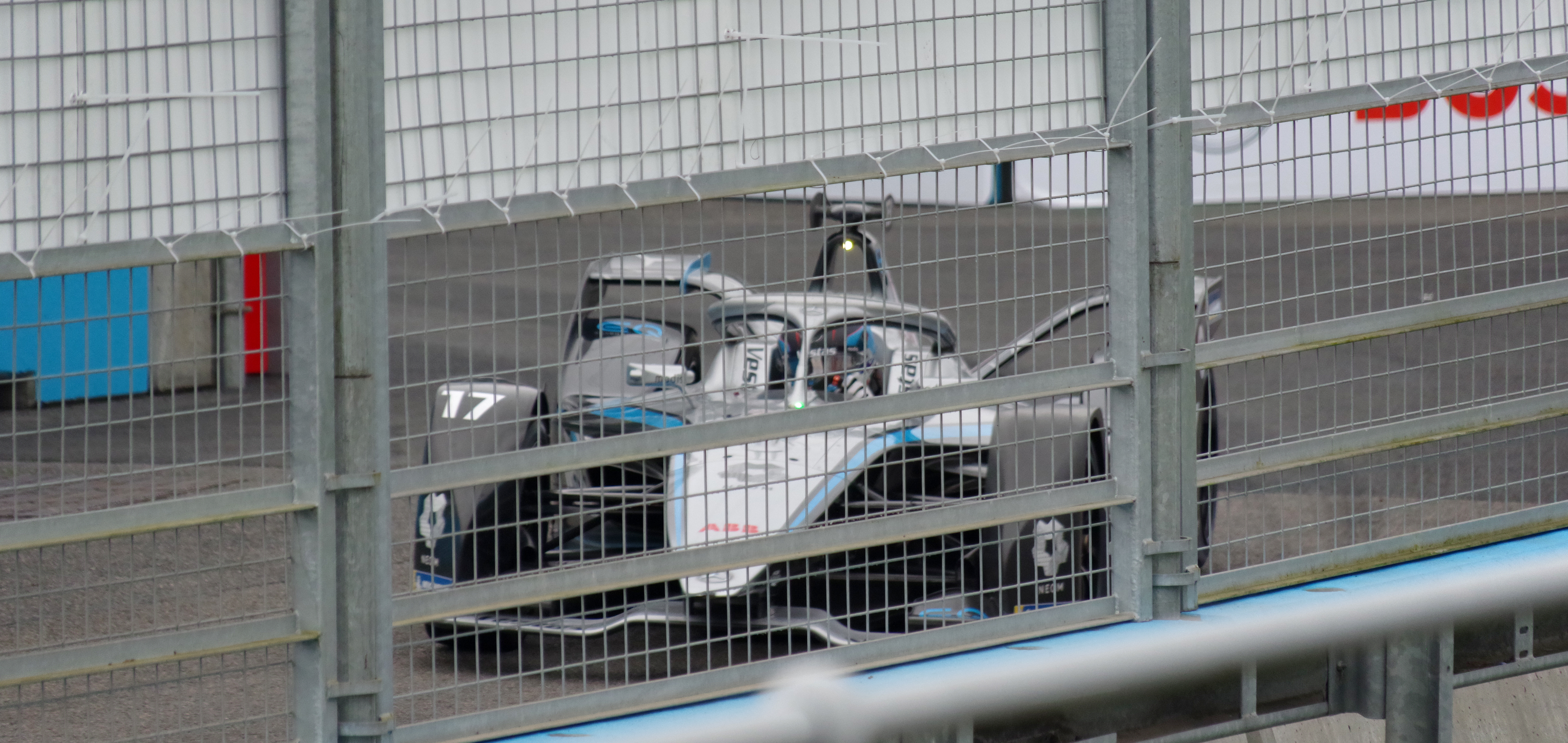
Nyck de Vries during the 2021 London ePrix

Following two rounds in which he only amassed a total of two points, de Vries fought for victory in both races of the London ePrix and finished in second place in both races, thus taking the lead in the championship before the final round. In the first race in Berlin, he did not score any points but managed to maintain his lead in the standings. Having qualified 13th for the final race of the season, de Vries was given an early advantage when title rivals Mitch Evans and Edoardo Mortara collided at the start, and fellow contender Jake Dennis was involved in a crash shortly after the restart. De Vries finished the race in eighth place, thus winning his first ever World Championship in Formula E. He ended the campaign with a total of two wins, four podiums and 99 points, seven ahead of vice-champion Mortara.

==== 2021–22 season ====
De Vries and Vandoorne remained with Mercedes for their swansong season in Formula E. De Vries won the first race of season 8 in Diriyah, and got pole the next day, but finished in tenth, and ended the championship in ninth with 106 points. De Vries left at the end of the season, securing a contract to compete in Formula One.

=== Mahindra (2024–present) ===
==== 2023–24 season ====
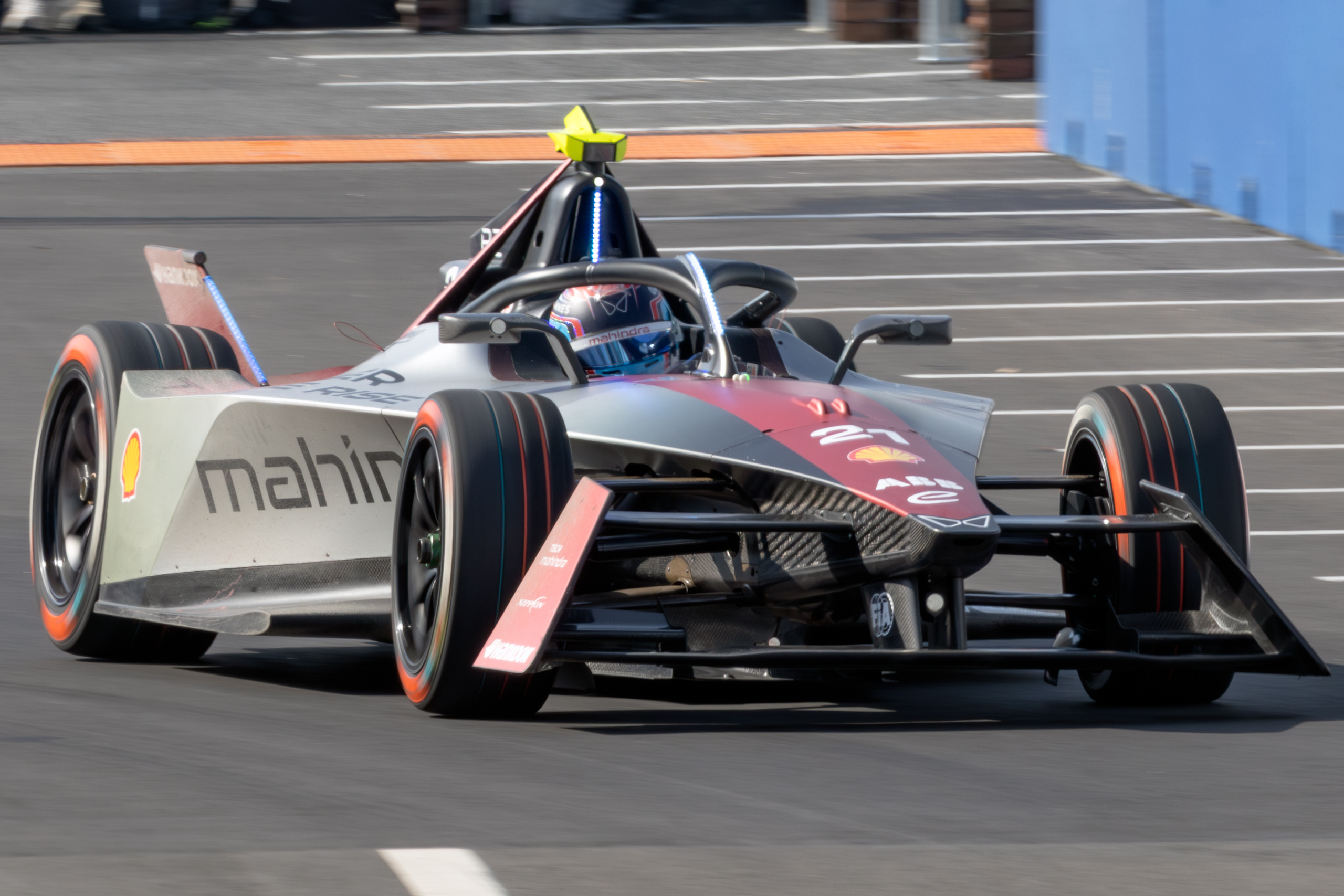
De Vries at the 2024 Tokyo ePrix

After having his Formula One career cut short, Mahindra Racing announced that de Vries would team up with Edoardo Mortara, who moved from Maserati MSG Racing, for the 2023–24 season.

==== 2024–25 season ====
De Vries continued with Mahindra Racing for the 2024–25 season alongside Edoardo Mortara once again. He would miss the Berlin ePrix due to a clash in the FIA World Endurance Championship and was replaced by Felipe Drugovich.

De Vries return second place podium Monaco. followed by a second-place finish in London Race 1 and Race 2.

==== 2025–26 season ====
De Vries won his first ePrix since Berlin 2022 at Monaco, followed by a third-place finish in Sanya.

==== 2026–27 season ====
De Vries and Mortara continued with Mahindra Racing heading into the Gen4 era for the 2026–27 season.

== Formula One career ==
De Vries was signed to the McLaren Young Driver Programme in 2010, and the Audi Sport Racing Academy in 2016. He left McLaren before the 2019 season to focus on his duties at Audi, where he stayed until September 2019.

=== Test and reserve driver roles (2020–2022) ===
De Vries driving for Mercedes during free practice for the 2022 French Grand Prix

In December 2020, de Vries and fellow Mercedes-EQ Formula E Team driver Stoffel Vandoorne performed their first Formula One test for the Mercedes team at the season-ending Young Driver Test. The following year he became one of the two reserve drivers for the team, again partnered with his Mercedes-EQ teammate Stoffel Vandoorne.

==== 2022: Race debut on loan to Williams ====
De Vries made his Formula 1 practice debut at the 2022 Spanish Grand Prix, where he took Alex Albon's place at Williams for the hour-long session. For the French Grand Prix, de Vries ran in another practice session at Mercedes, taking seven-time World Champion Lewis Hamilton's place. De Vries then again drove a Mercedes in free practice for the Mexico City Grand Prix in place of George Russell.

In September, de Vries tested the Alpine A521 at the Hungaroring, alongside Antonio Giovinazzi and Jack Doohan.

For the 2022 São Paulo Grand Prix, de Vries was appointed as Lando Norris's replacement at McLaren in case Norris was unable to race due to food poisoning; he recovered the next day and was able to compete.

===== 2022 Italian Grand Prix =====
At the Italian Grand Prix, de Vries took part in first practice in place of Sebastian Vettel at Aston Martin. De Vries then replaced Alex Albon at Williams for each of third practice, qualifying, and the race, after Albon suffered appendicitis and was ruled out on Saturday morning. He managed to advance to Q2 and qualify thirteenth, ahead of his Williams teammate Nicholas Latifi. He started eighth after penalties were applied to multiple drivers. He finished the race in ninth position, scoring points on his race debut and was rewarded with Driver of the Day by fans.

=== AlphaTauri (2023) ===
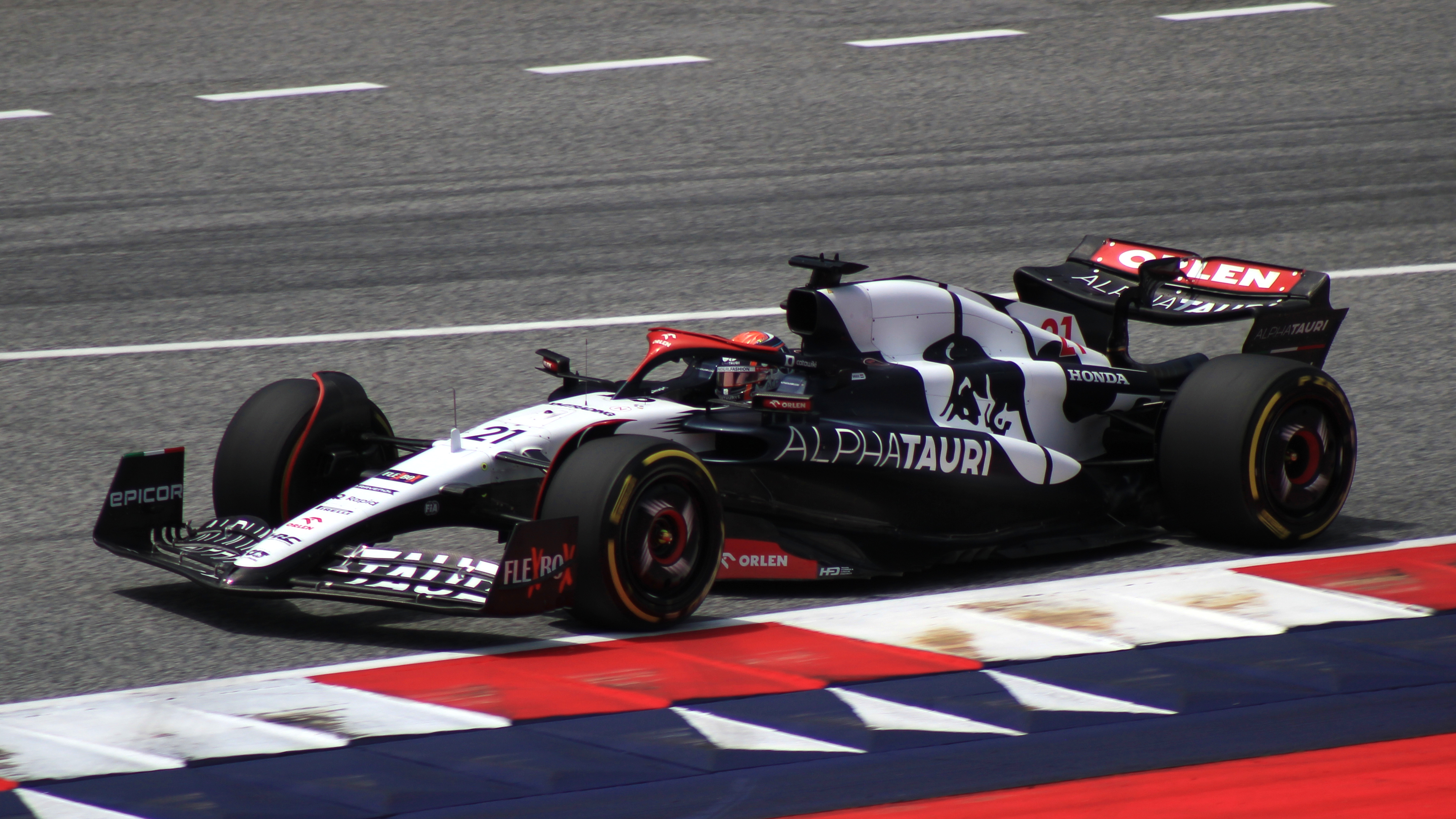
De Vries at the 2023 Austrian Grand Prix

De Vries was signed by Scuderia AlphaTauri for the 2023 season, replacing Pierre Gasly, who left for Alpine.

De Vries qualified 19th and finished 14th for the season-opening Bahrain Grand Prix and followed that result by qualifying 18th and finishing 14th at the Saudi Arabian Grand Prix.

De Vries qualified 15th making Q2 for the first time at the Australian Grand Prix but he retired from a chaotic race after Logan Sargeant crashed into the back of him taking both cars out and he was classified in 15th. De Vries crashed in qualifying for the Azerbaijan Grand Prix. He qualified last for the sprint and finished the shorter race 14th. He crashed out of the main race on lap 10 after clipping the wall at turn 5. In both the races that he retired from, teammate Yuki Tsunoda had scored points putting pressure on de Vries for his results to improve.

De Vries qualified 15th in the Miami Grand Prix, out-qualifying teammate Tsunoda for the first time that year. He drove into the back of Lando Norris' McLaren at the start of the race, ending his chance of a good result. He finished the race 18th and 24 seconds behind Tsunoda.

De Vries qualified 12th in Monaco and finished the race where he started in 12th but he beat Tsunoda for the first time that year in a race. De Vries qualified 14th in Spain, out qualifying Tsunoda for the second time that year but he finished the race in 14th behind Tsunoda. De Vries qualified and finished the race 18th in Canada whilst coming under criticism for forcing Kevin Magnussen off the road on lap 35.

De Vries qualified last for the Austrian Grand Prix but qualified 14th for the sprint and finished the shorter race 17th. He finished 17th in the main race after receiving a 15-second time penalty for numerous track limit infringements and another 5-second penalty for forcing Magnussen off track for the second race in a row. After the race, Magnussen said De Vries was driving like a desperate man. De Vries qualified 18th and finished 17th and last at the British Grand Prix. With ten races of the season completed, de Vries was 20th and last in the drivers championship having scored no points whilst teammate Tsunoda had scored two points.

Two days after the Silverstone race, de Vries was released by AlphaTauri with Daniel Ricciardo replacing him for the rest of the season. Prior to his dismissal, de Vries was criticised for his performance, most notably by Red Bull motorsport advisor Helmut Marko. The decision to dismiss de Vries halfway through his rookie season was criticised by several Dutch and Formula E racing drivers.

== Other racing ==
=== IndyCar Series ===
De Vries took part in an IndyCar test with Meyer Shank Racing at Sebring International Raceway on 6 December 2021, alongside his Formula E teammate Stoffel Vandoorne, who tested for Arrow McLaren SP, Callum Ilott and Jack Aitken. Four-time Indianapolis 500 winner Hélio Castroneves helped familiarize de Vries with the Dallara DW12. He set the fastest times in the test amongst the four drivers.

=== Super Formula ===
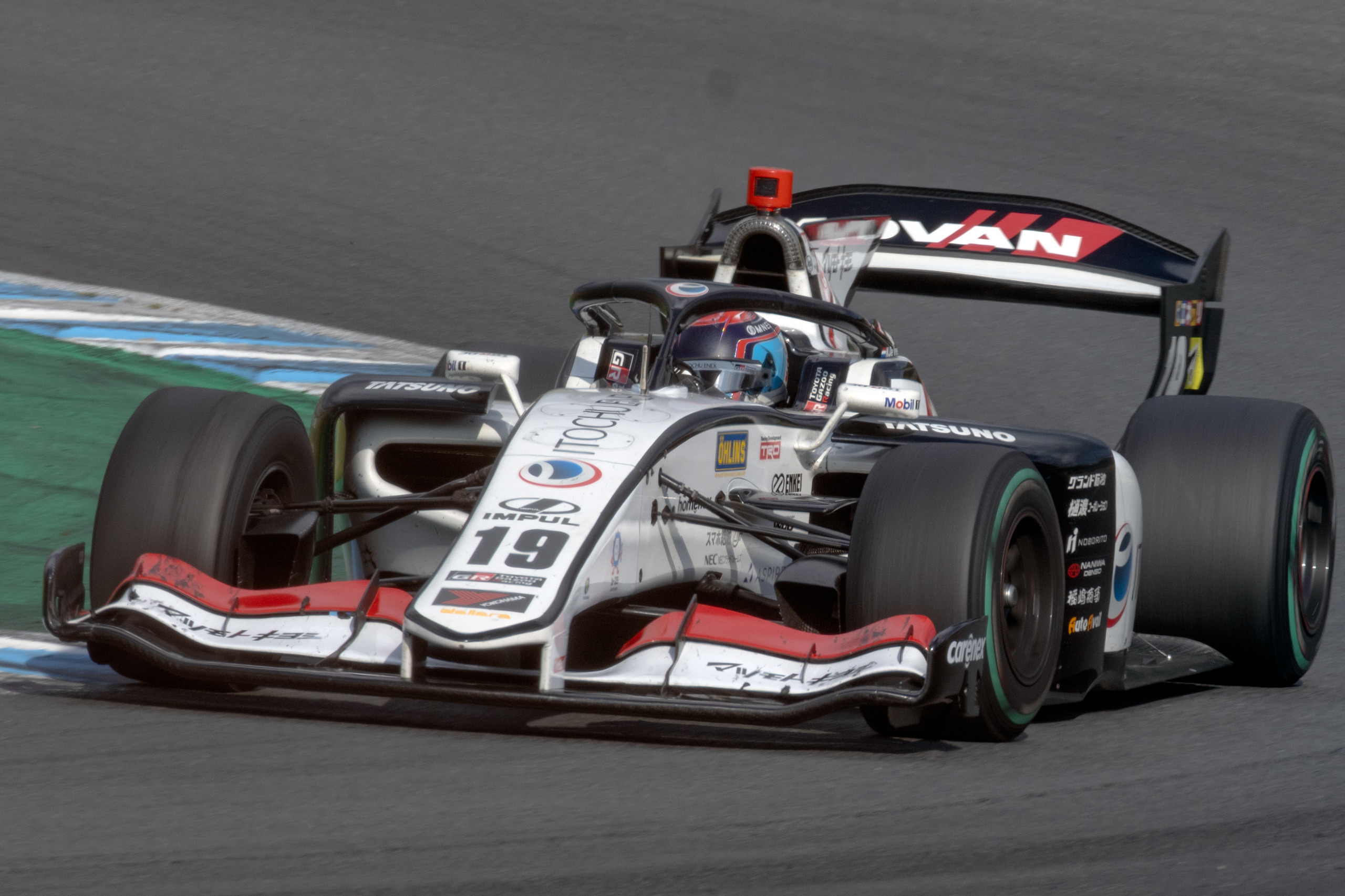
De Vries driving for Team Impul at the 2024 Super Formula Motegi round

In 2024, de Vries would take part in two of the final three rounds in Motegi and Fuji Speedway, thus making his Super Formula debut with Team Impul.

== Karting record ==
=== Karting career summary ===
Season	Series	Team	Position
2004	Open Belgian Championship — Mini		10th
2005	Championnat de France — Minimes		20th
2006	Belgian Championship — Cadet		2nd
2006	Dutch Championship — ICA Junior		3rd
2007	Chrono Rotax Max Winter Cup — Junior		2nd
2007	Dutch KNAF Championship — KF3		2nd
2007	Chrono Dutch Rotax Max Challenge — Junior		2nd
2007	Rotax Max Challenge Belgium — Junior		2nd
2007	Belgian Championship — KF3		2nd
2008	South Garda Winter Cup — KF3	De Vries Competition	7th
2008	Andrea Margutti Trophy — KF3	De Vries Competition	6th
2008	German Karting Championship — Junior	De Vries Competition	1st
2008	WSK International Series — KF3	De Vries Competition	1st
2008	Tom Trana Trophy — KF3		4th
2008	Championnat de France — KF3		16th
2008	CIK-FIA European Championship — KF3	Chiesa Corse	NC
2008	CIK-FIA Monaco Kart Cup — KF3	Chiesa Corse	10th
2008	Bridgestone Cup European Final — KF3		2nd
2009	South Garda Winter Cup — KF3	Chiesa Corse	28th
2009	Andrea Margutti Trophy — KF3	Chiesa Corse	2nd
2009	Belgian Championship — KF3		18th
2009	German Karting Championship — Junior	De Vries Competition	1st
2009	CIK-FIA European Championship — KF3	Chiesa Corse	1st
2009	CIK-FIA World Cup — KF3	Chiesa Corse	5th
2009	CIK-FIA Monaco Kart Cup — KF3	Chiesa Corse	4th
2009	WSK International Series — KF3	Chiesa Corse	1st
2010	South Garda Winter Cup — SKF	Chiesa Corse	14th
2010	CIK-FIA World Cup — SKF	Chiesa Corse	3rd
2010	WSK Euro Series — SKF	Chiesa Corse	2nd
2010	CIK-FIA World Championship — SKF	Chiesa Corse	1st
2010	WSK World Series — SKF	Chiesa Corse	2nd
2011	South Garda Winter Cup — KZ2		15th
2011	WSK Euro Series — KF1	Chiesa Corse	1st
2011	CIK-FIA World Championship — KF1		1st

== Racing record ==
=== Racing career summary ===
Season	Series	Team	Races	Wins	Poles	F/Laps	Podiums	Points	Position
2012	Eurocup Formula Renault 2.0	R-ace GP	14	0	0	1	2	78	5th
2012	Formula Renault 2.0 NEC	R-ace GP	11	1	1	2	4	166	10th
2013	Eurocup Formula Renault 2.0	Koiranen GP	14	2	1	2	5	113	5th
2013	Formula Renault 2.0 Alps	Koiranen GP	6	0	0	0	2	68	8th
2014	Eurocup Formula Renault 2.0	Koiranen GP	14	5	6	5	10	254	**1st**
2014	Formula Renault 2.0 Alps	Koiranen GP	14	9	9	10	12	300	**1st**
2015	Formula Renault 3.5 Series	DAMS	17	1	1	1	6	160	**3rd**
2016	GP3 Series	ART Grand Prix	18	2	1	1	5	133	6th
2017	FIA Formula 2 Championship	Rapax	13	1	0	0	4	114	7th
2017	FIA Formula 2 Championship	Racing Engineering	8	0	0	2	1	114	7th
2018	FIA Formula 2 Championship	Pertamina Prema Theodore Racing	24	3	2	4	6	202	4th
2018–19	FIA World Endurance Championship - LMP2	Racing Team Nederland	6	0	0	2	0	64	9th
2019	FIA Formula 2 Championship	ART Grand Prix	22	4	5	3	12	266	**1st**
2019	24 Hours of Le Mans - LMP2	Racing Team Nederland	1	0	0	0	0	N/A	15th
2019–20	Formula E	Mercedes-Benz EQ Formula E Team	11	0	0	0	1	60	11th
2019–20	FIA World Endurance Championship - LMP2	Racing Team Nederland	6	1	0	2	2	99	10th
2019–20	FIA World Endurance Championship - LMP1	Toyota Gazoo Racing	Reserve driver						
2020	European Le Mans Series	G-Drive Racing	3	1	0	1	2	43	5th
2020	Formula One	Mercedes AMG Petronas F1 Team	Test driver						
2020–21	Formula E	Mercedes-EQ Formula E Team	15	2	1	2	4	99	**1st**
2021	European Le Mans Series	G-Drive Racing	5	1	2	0	2	67	5th
2021	FIA World Endurance Championship - LMP2	G-Drive Racing	1	0	0	0	0	0	NC†
2021	FIA World Endurance Championship - LMP2	Racing Team Nederland	1	0	0	0	1	15	19th
2021	Formula One	Mercedes-AMG Petronas F1 Team	Reserve driver						
2021	FIA World Endurance Championship - Hypercar	Toyota Gazoo Racing	Reserve driver						
2021–22	Formula E	Mercedes-EQ Formula E Team	16	2	1	1	3	106	9th
2022	Formula One	Williams Racing	1	0	0	0	0	2	21st
2022	Formula One	Mercedes-AMG Petronas F1 Team	Reserve/Third driver						
2022	Formula One	McLaren F1 Team	Reserve driver						
2022	Formula One	Aston Martin Aramco Cognizant Formula One Team	Test driver						
2022	24 Hours of Le Mans - LMP2	TDS Racing x Vaillante	1	0	0	0	0	N/A	4th
2022	FIA World Endurance Championship - Hypercar	Toyota Gazoo Racing	Reserve driver						
2023	Formula One	Scuderia AlphaTauri	10	0	0	0	0	0	22nd
2023–24	Formula E	Mahindra Racing	14	0	0	1	0	18	18th
2024	FIA World Endurance Championship - Hypercar	Toyota Gazoo Racing	8	1	1	0	3	113	**3rd**
2024	Super Formula	Itochu Enex Team Impul	3	0	0	0	0	0	18th
2024–25	Formula E	Mahindra Racing	14	0	0	0	3	92	8th
2025	FIA World Endurance Championship - Hypercar	Toyota Gazoo Racing	8	1	1	1	1	89	6th
2025	Formula One	McLaren F1 Team	Test/Simulator driver						
2025–26	Formula E	Mahindra Racing	16	2	1	1	4	115	7th
2026	FIA World Endurance Championship - Hypercar	Toyota Racing	8	1	0	1	3	97	**2nd**
2026	Formula One	McLaren Mastercard F1 Team	Test/Simulator driver						
2026–27	Formula E	Mahindra Racing	0	0	0	0	0	0	TBD

^{†} As De Vries was a guest driver, he was ineligible for championship points.

=== Complete Formula Renault 2.0 North European Cup results ===
(key) (Races in bold indicate pole position) (Races in italics indicate fastest lap)

Year	Entrant	1	2	3	4	5	6	7	8	9	10	11	12	13	14	15	16	17	18	19	20	Pos	Points
2012	R-ace GP	HOC; 1; 32	HOC; 2; 6	HOC; 3; 22	NÜR; 1; 4	NÜR; 2; 2	OSC; 1	OSC; 2	OSC; 3	ASS; 1; 2	**ASS**; **2**; 1	RBR; 1; 5	RBR; 2; 3	MST; 1	MST; 2	MST; 3	ZAN; 1	ZAN; 2	ZAN; 3	SPA; 1; 8	SPA; 2; 14	10th	166

=== Complete Eurocup Formula Renault 2.0 results ===
(key) (Races in bold indicate pole position) (Races in italics indicate fastest lap)

Year	Entrant	1	2	3	4	5	6	7	8	9	10	11	12	13	14	Pos	Points
2012	R-ace GP	ALC; 1; 2	ALC; 2; 16	SPA; 1 Ret	SPA; 2; 16	NÜR; 1; 4	NÜR; 2 Ret	MSC; 1 Ret	MSC; 2; 4	HUN; 1; 4	HUN; 2; 2	LEC; 1; 7	LEC; 2; 13	CAT; 1; 22	CAT; 2; 27	5th	78
2013	Koiranen GP	ALC; 1; 9	ALC; 2; 7	SPA; 1 Ret	SPA; 2; 8	MSC; 1; 10	MSC; 2; 16	RBR; 1; 15	RBR; 2; 12	HUN; 1; 3	HUN; 2; 1	LEC; 1; 3	LEC; 2; 12	**CAT**; **1**; 1	CAT; 2; 2	5th	113
2014	Koiranen GP	**ALC**; **1**; 1	ALC; 2; 4	**SPA**; **1**; 2	**SPA**; **2**; 3	MSC; 1 Ret	**MSC**; **2**; 2	NÜR; 1; 1	NÜR; 2; 4	HUN; 1; 3	HUN; 2; 7	**LEC**; **1**; 1	**LEC**; **2**; 1	JER; 1; 1	JER; 2; 2	1st	254

=== Complete Formula Renault 2.0 Alps Series results ===
(key) (Races in bold indicate pole position) (Races in italics indicate fastest lap)

Year	Entrant	1	2	3	4	5	6	7	8	9	10	11	12	13	14	Pos	Points
2013	Koiranen GP	VLL; 1; 4	VLL; 2 Ret	IMO1; 1; 5	IMO1; 2; 5	SPA; 1	SPA; 2	MNZ; 1	MNZ; 2	MIS; 1	MIS; 2	MUG; 1; 2	MUG; 2; 2	IMO2; 1	IMO2; 2	8th	68
2014	Koiranen GP	**IMO**; **1**; 1	**IMO**; **2**; 1	**PAU**; **1**; 1	**PAU**; **2**; 1	RBR; 1; 3	RBR; 2; 3	**SPA**; **1**; 1	**SPA**; **2**; 1	MNZ; 1; 4	MNZ; 2; 6	**MUG**; **1**; 1	**MUG**; **2**; 1	JER; 1; 2	**JER**; **2**; 1	1st	300

=== Complete Formula Renault 3.5 Series results ===
(key) (Races in bold indicate pole position) (Races in italics indicate fastest lap)

Year	Team	1	2	3	4	5	6	7	8	9	10	11	12	13	14	15	16	17	Pos	Points
2015	DAMS	ALC; 1; 7	**ALC**; **2**; 2	MON; 1; 11	SPA; 1; 9	SPA; 2; 2	HUN; 1; 11	HUN; 2; 9	RBR; 1; 3	RBR; 2; 5	SIL; 1; 4	SIL; 2 Ret	NÜR; 1; 2	NÜR; 2; 3	BUG; 1; 7	BUG; 2; 10	JER; 1; 4	JER; 2; 1	3rd	160

=== Complete GP3 Series results ===
(key) (Races in bold indicate pole position) (Races in italics indicate fastest lap)

Year	Entrant	1	2	3	4	5	6	7	8	9	10	11	12	13	14	15	16	17	18	Pos	Points
2016	ART Grand Prix	CAT; FEA; 9	CAT; SPR; 5	RBR; FEA; 3	RBR; SPR; 4	SIL; FEA; 5	SIL; SPR; 8	**HUN**; **FEA**; 20	HUN; SPR; 13	HOC; FEA; 2	HOC; SPR; 8	SPA; FEA; 3	SPA; SPR; 8	MNZ; FEA; 7	MNZ; SPR; 1	SEP; FEA; 13	SEP; SPR; 6	YMC; FEA; 1	YMC; SPR; 11	6th	133

=== Complete FIA Formula 2 Championship results ===
(key) (Races in bold indicate pole position) (Races in italics indicate points for the fastest lap of the top ten finishers)

Year	Entrant	1	2	3	4	5	6	7	8	9	10	11	12	13	14	15	16	17	18	19	20	21	22	23	24	DC	Points
2017	Rapax	BHR; FEA; 10	BHR; SPR; 6	CAT; FEA; 10	CAT; SPR; Ret	MON; FEA; 7	MON; SPR; 1	BAK; FEA; 2	BAK; SPR; Ret	RBR; FEA; 13	RBR; SPR; 16†	SIL; FEA; DNS	SIL; SPR; 7	HUN; FEA; 3	HUN; SPR; 3											7th	114
2017	Racing Engineering															SPA; FEA; 5	SPA; SPR; 2	MNZ; FEA; 18	MNZ; SPR; 12	JER; FEA; 13	JER; SPR; 6	YMC; FEA; 4	YMC; SPR; 9			7th	114
2018	Pertamina Prema Theodore Racing	BHR; FEA; 6	BHR; SPR; 5	BAK; FEA; Ret	BAK; SPR; 2	CAT; FEA; 2	CAT; SPR; Ret	MON; FEA; Ret	MON; SPR; 9	LEC; FEA; 5	LEC; SPR; 1	RBR; FEA; Ret	RBR; SPR; 14	SIL; FEA; 7	SIL; SPR; 6	HUN; FEA; 1	HUN; SPR; 7	**SPA**; **FEA**; 1	SPA; SPR; 4	MNZ; FEA; 9	MNZ; SPR; 17	**SOC**; **FEA**; 3	SOC; SPR; 4	YMC; FEA; 4	YMC; SPR; 5	4th	202
2019	ART Grand Prix	BHR; FEA; 6	BHR; SPR; 7	BAK; FEA; 2	BAK; SPR; 4	CAT; FEA; 5	CAT; SPR; 1	**MON**; **FEA**; 1	MON; SPR; 7	LEC; FEA; 1	LEC; SPR; 10	**RBR**; **FEA**; 3	RBR; SPR; 3	SIL; FEA; 6	SIL; SPR; 3	**HUN**; **FEA**; 2	HUN; SPR; 6	**SPA**; **FEA**; C	SPA; SPR; C	MNZ; FEA; 3	MNZ; SPR; 3	**SOC**; **FEA**; 1	SOC; SPR; 2	YMC; FEA; 13	YMC; SPR; 13	1st	266

^{†} Driver did not finish the race, but was classified as he completed over 90% of the race distance.

=== Complete Formula E results ===
(key) (Races in bold indicate pole position; races in italics indicate fastest lap)

Year	Team	Chassis	Powertrain	1	2	3	4	5	6	7	8	9	10	11	12	13	14	15	16	17	Pos	Points
2019–20	Mercedes-Benz EQ Formula E Team	Spark SRT05e	Mercedes-Benz EQ Silver Arrow 01	DIR; 6	DIR; 16	SCL; 5	MEX; Ret	MRK; 11	BER; 4	BER; Ret	BER; 18	BER; 4	BER; 14	BER; 2							11th	60
2020–21	Mercedes-EQ Formula E Team	Spark SRT05e	Mercedes-EQ Silver Arrow 02	**DIR**; 1	DIR; 9	RME; Ret	RME; Ret	VLC; 1	VLC; 16	MCO; Ret	PUE; 9	PUE; Ret	NYC; 13	NYC; 18	LDN; 2	LDN; 2	BER; 22	BER; 8			1st	99
2021–22	Mercedes-EQ Formula E Team	Spark SRT05e	Mercedes-EQ Silver Arrow 02	DRH; 1	**DRH**; 10	MEX; 6	RME; Ret	RME; 14	MCO; 10	BER; 10	BER; 1	JAK; Ret	MRK; 6	NYC; 8	NYC; 7	LDN; 6	LDN; 3	SEO; Ret	SEO; Ret		9th	106
2023–24	Mahindra Racing	Formula E Gen3	Mahindra M9Electro	MEX; 15	DRH; 17	DRH; 15	SAP; 14	TOK; Ret	MIS; 14	MIS; 15	MCO; 12	BER	BER	SIC; 7	SIC; 16	POR; 12	POR; Ret	LDN; 4	LDN; 16		18th	18
2024–25	Mahindra Racing	Formula E Gen3 Evo	Mahindra M11Electro	SAO; 6	MEX; 8	JED; 4	JED; 13	MIA; 11	MCO; 2	MCO; 5	TKO; 11	TKO; 15	SHA; 8	SHA; 12	JKT; Ret	BER	BER	LDN; 2	LDN; 2		8th	92
2025–26	Mahindra Racing	Formula E Gen3 Evo	Mahindra M12Electro	SAO; 9	MEX; Ret	MIA; 5	JED; DNS	JED; 20	MAD; 18	BER; 9	BER; Ret	MCO; 1	MCO; 8	SAN; 3	SHA; 5	SHA; 18	TKO; 17	TKO; 1	LDN; 13	**LDN**; 2	7th	115

^{*} Season still in progress.

=== Complete Formula One results ===
(key) (Races in bold indicate pole position) (Races in italics indicate fastest lap)

Year	Entrant	Chassis	Engine	1	2	3	4	5	6	7	8	9	10	11	12	13	14	15	16	17	18	19	20	21	22	WDC	Points
2022	Williams Racing	Williams FW44	Mercedes-AMG F1 M13 E Performance 1.6 V6 t	BHR	SAU	AUS	EMI	MIA	ESP; TD	MON	AZE	CAN	GBR	AUT					ITA; 9	SIN	JPN	USA				21st	2
2022	Mercedes-AMG Petronas F1 Team	Mercedes-AMG F1 W13	Mercedes-AMG F1 M13 E Performance 1.6 V6 t												FRA; TD	HUN	BEL	NED					MXC; TD	SAP	ABU	21st	2
2022	Aston Martin Aramco Cognizant F1 Team	Aston Martin AMR22	Mercedes-AMG F1 M13 E Performance 1.6 V6 t																ITA; TD							21st	2
2023	Scuderia AlphaTauri	AlphaTauri AT04	Honda RBPTH001 1.6 V6 t	BHR; 14	SAU; 14	AUS; 15†	AZE; Ret	MIA; 18	MON; 12	ESP; 14	CAN; 18	AUT; 17	GBR; 17	HUN	BEL	NED	ITA	SIN	JPN	QAT	USA	MXC	SAP	LVG	ABU	22nd	0

^{†} Did not finish, but was classified as he had completed more than 90% of the race distance.

=== Complete FIA World Endurance Championship results ===
(key) (Races in bold indicate pole position; races in italics indicate fastest lap)

Year	Entrant	Class	Car	Engine	1	2	3	4	5	6	7	8	Rank	Points
2018–19	Racing Team Nederland	LMP2	Dallara P217	Gibson GK428 4.2 L V8	SPA	LMS	SIL; 5	FUJ; 7	SHA; 5	SEB; 5	SPA; 5	LMS; 5	9th	64
2019–20	Racing Team Nederland	LMP2	Oreca 07	Gibson GK428 4.2 L V8	SIL	FUJ; 1	SHA; 5	BHR; 5	COA; 5	SPA	LMS; 6	BHR; 3	10th	99
2021	G-Drive Racing	LMP2	Aurus 01	Gibson GK428 4.2 L V8	SPA; Ret	ALG							NC†	0
2021	Racing Team Nederland	LMP2	Oreca 07	Gibson GK428 4.2 L V8			MNZ; 3	LMS	BHR	BHR			19th	15
2024	Toyota Gazoo Racing	Hypercar	Toyota GR010 Hybrid	Toyota H8909 3.5 L Turbo V6 (Hybrid)	QAT; 5	IMO; 1	SPA; 7	LMS; 2	**SÃO**; 4	COA; 2	FUJ; Ret	BHR; Ret	3rd	113
2025	Toyota Gazoo Racing	Hypercar	Toyota GR010 Hybrid	Toyota H8909 3.5 L Turbo V6 (Hybrid)	QAT; 6	IMO; 7	SPA; 7	LMS; 5	SÃO; 14	COA; 14	FUJ; 7	**BHR**; 1	6th	89
2026	Toyota Racing	Hypercar	Toyota TR010 Hybrid	Toyota H8909 3.5 L Turbo V6 (Hybrid)	IMO; 3	SPA; 5	LMS; 1	SÃO; 12	COA; Ret	FUJ; 8	CAT; 2	MNZ; 11	2nd	97

^{†} As De Vries was a guest driver, he was ineligible for championship points

=== Complete 24 Hours of Le Mans results ===
Year	Team	Co-Drivers	Car	Class	Laps	Pos.	Class Pos.
2019	(Netherlands) Racing Team Nederland	(Netherlands) Giedo van der Garde (Netherlands) Frits van Eerd	Dallara P217-Gibson	LMP2	340	26th	15th
2020	(Netherlands) Racing Team Nederland	(Netherlands) Giedo van der Garde (Netherlands) Frits van Eerd	Oreca 07-Gibson	LMP2	349	19th	15th
2021	G-Drive Racing	Roman Rusinov (Argentina) Franco Colapinto	Aurus 01-Gibson	LMP2	358	12th	7th
2022	(France) TDS Racing x Vaillante	(Switzerland) Mathias Beche (Netherlands) Tijmen van der Helm	Oreca 07-Gibson	LMP2	368	8th	4th
2024	(Japan) Toyota Gazoo Racing	(Argentina) José María López (Japan) Kamui Kobayashi	Toyota GR010 Hybrid	Hypercar	311	**2nd**	**2nd**
2025	(Japan) Toyota Gazoo Racing	(United Kingdom) Mike Conway (Japan) Kamui Kobayashi	Toyota GR010 Hybrid	Hypercar	386	5th	5th
2026	(Japan) Toyota Racing	(United Kingdom) Mike Conway (Japan) Kamui Kobayashi	Toyota TR010 Hybrid	Hypercar	381	**1st**	**1st**

=== Complete European Le Mans Series results ===
(key) (Races in bold indicate pole position; results in italics indicate fastest lap)

Year	Entrant	Class	Chassis	Engine	1	2	3	4	5	6	Rank	Points
2020	G-Drive Racing	LMP2	Aurus 01	Gibson GK428 4.2 L V8	LEC; 2	SPA	LEC	MNZ; Ret	ALG; 1		5th	43
2021	G-Drive Racing	LMP2	Aurus 01	Gibson GK428 4.2 L V8	**CAT**; 4	RBR; 2	**LEC**; 1	MNZ	SPA; Ret	ALG; 5	5th	67

=== Complete Super Formula results ===
Year	Team	Engine	1	2	3	4	5	6	7	8	9	DC	Points
2024	Itochu Enex Team Impul	Toyota	SUZ	AUT	SUG	FUJ	MOT; 13	FUJ; 11	FUJ; 11	SUZ	SUZ	18th	0

== Notes ==
Sporting positions
Preceded by Antonio Fuoco	Formula Renault 2.0 Alps; Champion; 2014	Succeeded by Jack Aitken
Preceded by Pierre Gasly	Eurocup Formula Renault 2.0; Champion; 2014	Succeeded by Jack Aitken
Preceded by George Russell	FIA Formula 2 Championship; Champion; 2019	Succeeded by Mick Schumacher
Preceded by António Félix da Costa	Formula E World Champion; 2020–21	Succeeded by Stoffel Vandoorne
Preceded by Phil Hanson; Robert Kubica; Yifei Ye	Winner of the 24 Hours of Le Mans; 2026; With: Kamui Kobayashi & Mike Conway	Succeeded by Incumbent
