= Haifa al-Bakr =

Qatari lawyer

Haifa al-Bakr is a Qatari lawyer.

In 2000 she became the first woman licensed to practise law in Qatar, paving the way for other women to follow her into the profession.
