= The Haifa Room =

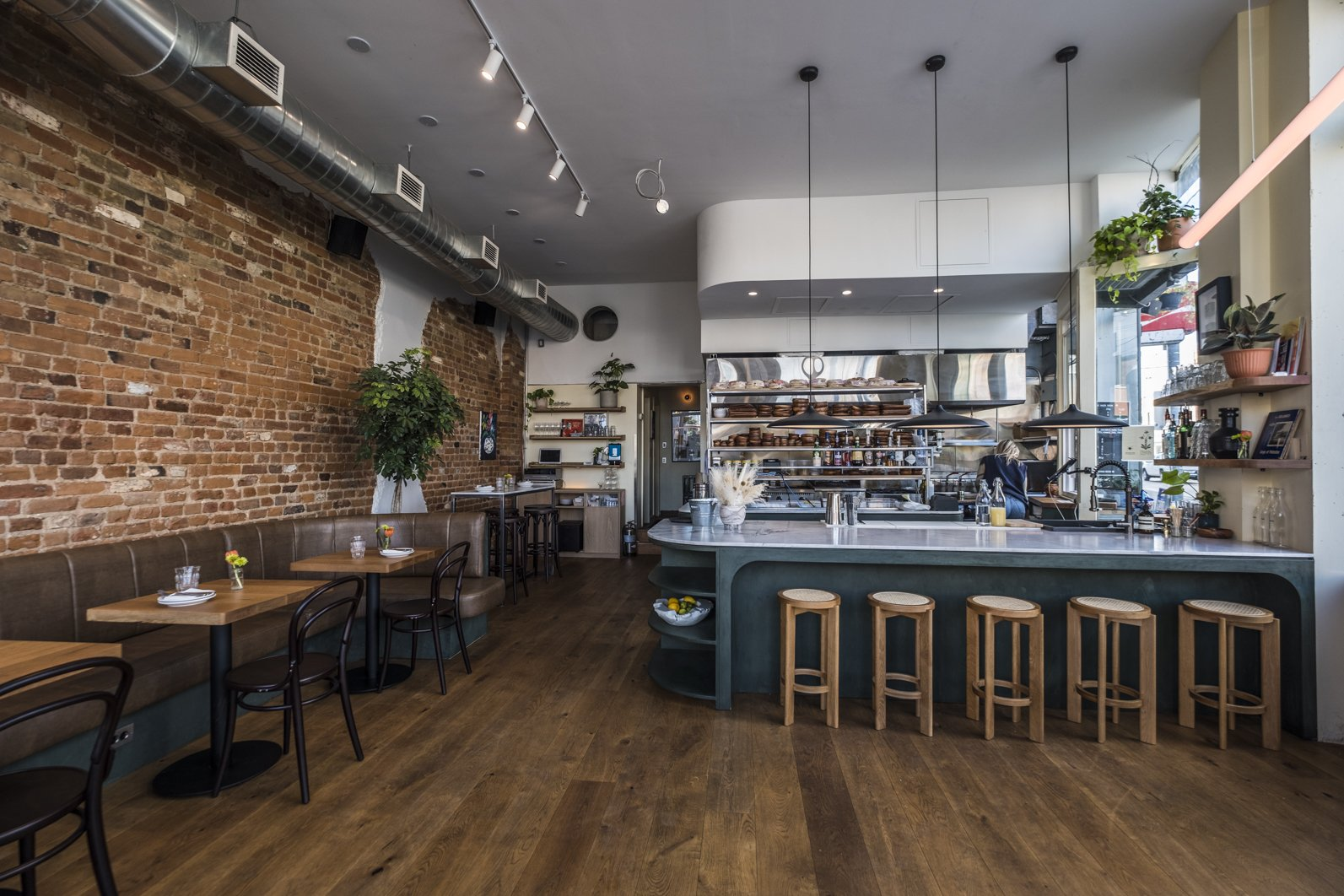

Restaurant information
- Established: 2021
- Food type: Middle Eastern
- Location: 224 Ossington Ave, Toronto, Canada
- Website: thehaifaroom.com

The Haifa Room is a Middle Eastern restaurant located in the Ossington Avenue neighbourhood of Toronto, Ontario, Canada. It is notable for being co-owned by individuals with both Palestinian and Jewish heritage, with the restaurant concept aiming to reflect the historical co-existence of these communities in the city of Haifa. The restaurant was founded by Fadi Hakim, Joseph Eastwood, Waseem Dabdoub, Mark Kupfert, and Daniel Suss.

== Concept and cuisine ==
The Haifa Room's concept is rooted in the founders' shared Middle Eastern background and their desire to showcase the culinary traditions of the region, drawing inspiration from the diverse flavours and dishes found in Haifa. The restaurant started as a take-out window in the summer of 2021 and has since grown into a sit-in dining spot. The menu features dishes like Yaffa shawarma and falafel, representing the broader Middle Eastern culinary landscape. The food is intended to transcend cultural, political, and religious divides.

A key aspect of The Haifa Room's identity is the partnership between its Jewish and Palestinian co-owners. This collaboration is intended to embody a spirit of co-existence and highlight the shared cultural elements between the two communities, particularly through their culinary traditions. The restaurant's name itself references the city of Haifa, a historically diverse port city in present-day Israel where Jewish and Arab communities have long resided. The co-owners see the restaurant as a "love letter" to their shared roots.

== Expansion to Vancouver ==
The team behind The Haifa Room has also established a new establishment in Vancouver, British Columbia, named Bar Haifa. Bar Haifa aims to blend Middle Eastern cultures and cuisines, offering a space for connection and commonality. The Vancouver location expands on the original vision by incorporating fresh, local seafood and ingredients and features a dedicated take-out street-food menu and an extensive wine and cocktail list. This expansion suggests a continuation of the original concept, further exploring and celebrating the blended culinary and cultural heritage of the Middle East. The opening of Bar Haifa occurred during a time of heightened division, highlighting the founders' continued commitment to fostering understanding.

== See also ==
- Middle Eastern cuisine
- Jewish cuisine
- Palestinian cuisine
- Interfaith dialogue
