= Haifa Charbel =

Lebanese producer and show host

Haifa Charbel is a Lebanese television presenter, executive producer, and documentary maker. She has created travel documentaries and high profile interviews with Lebanese businessmen, and prominent political figures. Haifa Charbel creates and produces Soufaraa al Arez (Cedar Ambassadors), a Lebanese diaspora affairs talk show. In 2015, she founded, and is the CEO of True Story Productions.

== Early life and education ==
Haifa was born in Jezzine, Southern Lebanon to Laure and Elias Charbel. She moved to Beirut where she obtained a BA in Human Resources Management, and an MBA in Business Management. In 2016, Haifa was a candidate on the Nehna La Jezzine (We are for Jezzine) municipal electoral list; the alliance won the Jezzine elections, and she became the youngest woman to be elected to her hometown's municipal council.

== Career and diaspora activism ==
Haifa worked as a consultant for local and international companies before founding, and is since 2015 CEO of True Story Productions. The company provides TV and film production services, as well as entertainment business consultancy services. In 2020, True Story Productions extended its services to Europe, and in 2020, inaugurated an office in the UK. Haifa produces and hosts Soufaraa al Arez (Cedar Ambassadors), an awarded talk show specializing in Lebanese diaspora affairs. The show that started in 2017 hosts high prominent and successful expatriated businessmen and political figures. The show is in its 5th season as of 2022. Haifa travels to Lebanese diaspora hotspots to personally conduct interviews with Lebanese expat guests.

In February 2019, Haifa Charbel's Cedar Ambassadors partnered with Forbes Middle East business magazine to accentuate influential regional business leaders. At the end of 2019, COVID-related travel restrictions caused Haifa to remain in Australia for a prolonged time, where she was preparing an episode of Cedar Ambassadors. While there, her Beirut office was heavily damaged by the 2020 Beirut explosion. In the aftermath of the catastrophe, she founded a humanitarian NGO, also called Cedar Ambassadors, focusing on human capital development. In 2021 Haifa filmed one of the most emotive episodes with the Abdallahs, an Australian-Lebanese family that lost three children when a drunk driver plowed into them. The family forgave the young driver in the episode.

In her show, Haifa highlights women entrepreneurs and advocates for women empowerment.
