= Formula E Holdings =

Owners, promoters, and acting holding company of the ABB FIA Formula E Championship

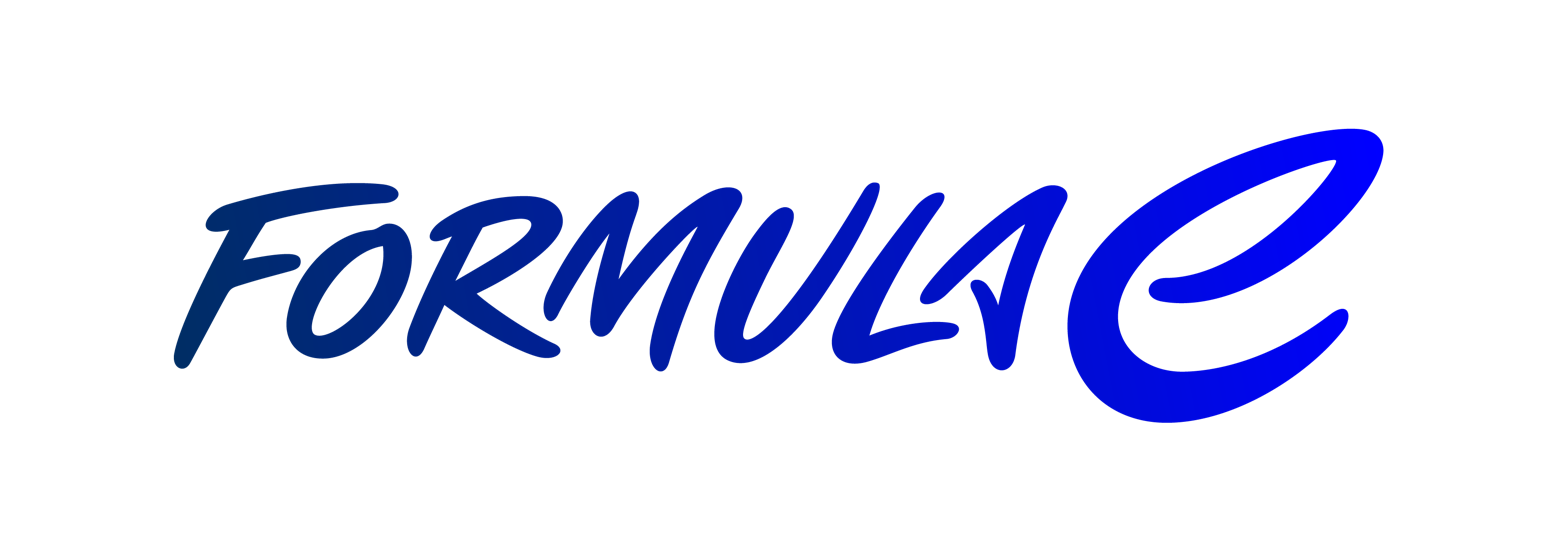
- Type: Holdings Company
- Industry: Motorsports
- Founded: March 3, 2012; 14 years ago in Hong Kong, China
- Founder: Alejandro Agag
- Headquarters: London, England
- Area served: Globally
- Key people: Alejandro Agag (chairman); Ben Padley (Chief marketing officer)
- Products: Formula E; Formula E Operations Limited
- Website: fiaformulae.com

Formula E Holdings Limited, (FEH) are the owners, promoters, and acting holding company of the ABB FIA Formula E Championship. Founded in 2012 by Alejandro Agag, with funding from entrepreneur Enrique Bañuelos, in order to fulfil an FIA tender to create an all-electric international racing series, FEH have overseen all five editions of the Formula E Championship from their registered bases in Hong Kong and London.

In their role as promoters for the Formula E Championship, FEH are responsible for negotiating and arranging the calendar, shipping and media coverage of the series.

== History ==
FEH was founded in the summer of 2012, shortly before winning the tender to organise an FIA accredited electric racing series on the 1 August of the same year. Founder and CEO Alejandro Agag, with funding from London based Spanish entrepreneur, Enrique Bañuelos, immediately set about securing a source of cars and other equipment for the series, with FEH and Spark Racing Technology signing a deal in November 2012. FEH officially ordered 42 examples of what would become the SRT_01E from Spark, and would subsequently distribute 40 of them to future entrants to the series.

== Formula E ==
Acting as the promoters of the new FIA Formula E Championship, FEH, having secured a deal for equipment, began arranging both a calendar and a number of sponsors for the series, with hopes of hosting its first race in 2014. The first sponsorship deal came with the signing of TAG Heuer as the series' official timekeeper, while Michelin and Renault became technical partners of Spark, all in early 2013. Elsewhere the new SRT_01E car completed testing towards the end of 2013, with the first examples delivered to FEH at their Donington Park operations headquarters in May 2014.

=== Debut season ===
FEH duly distributed the first ten cars, as well as thirty of the thirty-two cars still on order, to teams for testing in July 2014, a test which effectively served as the public unveiling of the series. After a full race simulation all 42 FE cars were shipped to Beijing, China for the first ever ePrix, which was staged on the 13 September 2014. In the build up to the debut race, which was to be won by Lucas di Grassi after a last lap collision between Nicolas Prost and Nick Heidfeld, FEH secured deals with DHL, BMW and Julius Bär to further promote the series.

=== ABB Alliance ===
Shortly before the 2018 Marrakech E-Prix, it was revealed that FEH and the FIA had secured a title sponsor for Formula E, with a deal with Swiss manufacturing firm ABB bringing in $15 million for the series.
