= Enrique Bañuelos =

Spanish billionaire

- Born: Enrique Bañuelos de Castro; 14 February 1966 (age 60); Sagunto, Spain
- Education: Universitat de València
- Occupations: Businessman real estate developer
- Known for: Founder of Astroc Mediterraneo
- Board member of: Veremonte, AGRE S.A.

Enrique Bañuelos de Castro is a Spanish businessman and entrepreneur. Bañuelos is one of twelve Spanish nationals to hold the position of being listed in Forbes World's Billionaires ranking (nº 655 in 2010). As of 2013 he was the 1342nd richest person in the world, with a net worth of $1 billion.

== Biography ==
Bañuelos was born in Sagunto, Valencia (Spain) on 14 February 1966. When he was 9 years old, his father died in an accident in the steelworks where he worked.

Bañuelos gained degrees in Law and Business Studies and set up his first company (dealing in honey and its by-products) at the age of 16. His real estate group was set up in the Mediterranean region and developed some 17,400,000m2, building around 50,000 properties, aimed at middle class buyers as second homes (average prices for these properties were around 120,000euros). 2006 saw the merger of several of his companies and the creation of ASTROC. The property and financial crises brought about the sale of ASTROC and a new focus for Bañuelos´ activities in international markets.

Bañuelos is married with two children.

== Investments in Brazil ==
In 2008, Bañuelos entered the Brazilian market, acquiring shares in AGRA, a Brasil Stock Exchange listed real estate company. In 2009, he bought into Abyara and Klabin Segal (both also listed), merging the 3 companies to create the AGRE S.A., the leading real estate group in sales. At the same time, Bañuelos has joined forces with the French chain Accor and the Arab group Jumeirah to invest in the hotel industry in Brazil, host of the 2016 Olympic Games.

The Valencian entrepreneur also has interests in other sectors within Brazil; in 2010 he plans to invest 2 billion (2,000,000,000) Brazilian reals (some 880 million euros) in assets and businesses in the healthcare, energy, infrastructure, environmental and food industries.

== Lawsuits ==
In March 2009 Enrique Bañuelos was cleared of charges of the possible use of inside information regarding a possible takeover bid for Fadesa, as it was considered that the economic press had already published articles relating to the issue.

In 2007 a lawsuit was filed by lawyer Felipe Izquierdo against Enrique Bañuelos for his management of Astroc. This was rejected by the Spanish National Court.

== Hobbies ==
Enrique Bañuelos is an avid jogger and runner of half-marathons. He has a passion for contemporary arts and in particular photography; through his foundation and in conjunction with the Valencian Institute of Modern Art (IVAM) he has promoted various exhibitions in, among other cities, Valencia, New York City, London and Beijing.
