= Haifa Beseisso =

Palestinian-American YouTuber

Haifa Beseisso / Fly With Haifa
- Born: 1990 (age 35–36); Dubai, Emirate of Dubai, United Arab Emirates
- Education: American University in Dubai
- Occupations: YouTuber; Vlogger
- Years active: 2014–present

YouTube information
- Channel: Fly With Haifa
- Genres: Travel & Culture
- Subscribers: 817 thousand
- Views: 50 million
- Last updated: July 10, 2025

Haifa Beseisso (Arabic: هيفاء بسيسو; born 1990) is a Palestinian-American YouTuber, blogger, and rapper who regularly posts about her travel experiences and speaks about topics of cultural significance in the Arab world.

== Early life and education ==
Haifa Beseisso was born and raised in Dubai. Beseisso pursued her education at the American University in Dubai, where she studied Digital Production and Storytelling. She graduated in 2012.

== Personal life ==
Beseisso is Palestinian. As of 2021, Beseisso is based in Dubai. She is Muslim and has a sister named Tala.

== Career ==
=== Early career ===
After graduating college in 2012, Haifa's career began with various roles in television production, including a position as a producer in the MBC Group, a leading media conglomerate in Dubai. She eventually became a producer there, and worked on shows related to technology and travel.

Haifa has continued to engage with the creative community, working on projects that bring together young creatives. She collaborated with Sheikha Alyazia al Nahyan from the royal family to provide a filmmaking workshop for creative individuals from the Comoros Islands.

=== Youtube channel ===
Beseisso first gained attention online after posting vlogs to her YouTube channel, Fly With Haifa, which she filmed in her free time while working on travel content for her employer. After posting for a year, she quit her broadcasting job.

Beseisso received invitations from some other countries to visit as a travel influencer, which brought more attention to her channel. She has also received ambassador brand deals from companies like Canon, Dove, Lipton, and Pandora.

In 2018, she released her single "Married to Life" by visiting major tourist areas in Dubai while wearing a white dress. Her video which subsequently went viral aimed at tackling the issue of early marriage and oppression of young girls.

In 2021, Haifa released a rap song titled "The 3aib Song," addressing the issue of "shame" and gender bias within Arab culture. The song was inspired by her interactions with social media followers who shared their experiences of shame. Haifa's music video for the song was filmed in the UAE and emphasizes the need to address gender inequality within Arab society.

=== Other work ===
An important moment in Haifa's career came in 2016 when she hosted the Nobel Peace Prize concert via YouTube live streaming, alongside renowned personalities like Sting and Conan O'Brien.

In 2017, she participated in YouTube's #MoreThanARefugee campaign.

In September 2019, she co-hosted the first Nickelodeon Kids' Choice Awards Abu Dhabi with Jason Derulo.

As she gained traction online, Beseisso began to use her platform to speak out against stereotypes of Arab people and countries. In 2021, after taking time to reflect during the lockdowns of the COVID-19 pandemic, Beseisso shifted her focus to promoting women's rights.

== Awards and recognition ==
Beseisso was recognized as the 'Best in Travel Influencer' at Cosmopolitan Middle East's 2019 Influencer Awards.

She was also selected as a YouTube Creator for Change Ambassador, participating in a program with 50 other creators from around the world. This initiative aimed to create impactful content that promotes positive change.
