= Greonterp =

- Village
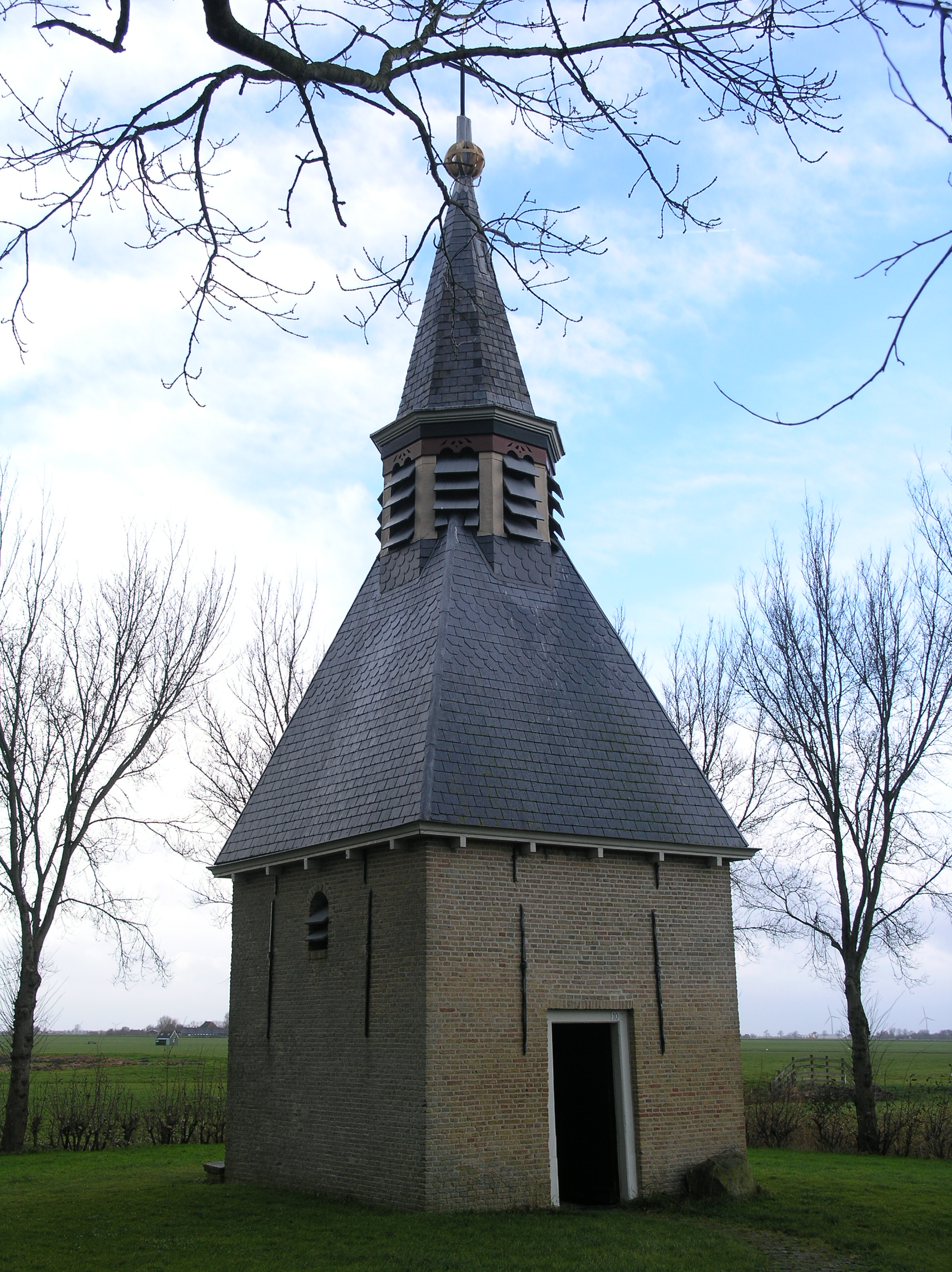
- Greonterp Belltower

- Flag Coat of arms

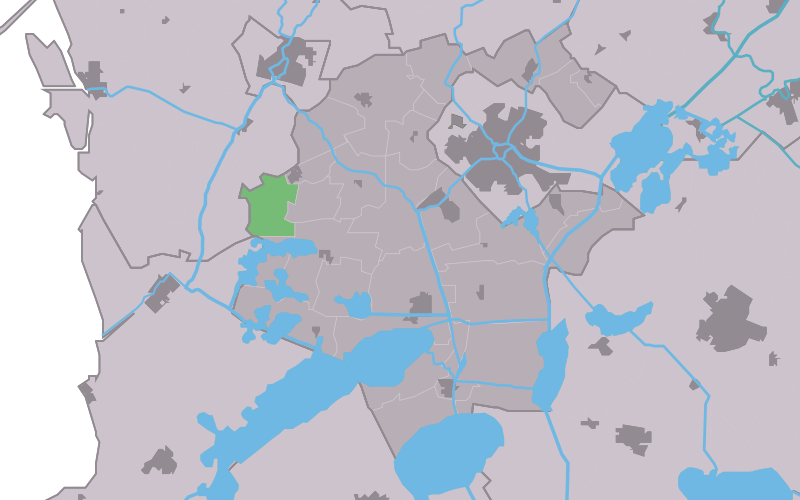
- Location in the former Wymbritseradiel municipality

- Location in the Netherlands Greonterp (Netherlands)
- Country: Netherlands
- Province: Friesland
- Municipality: Súdwest-Fryslân

Area
  - Total: 4.45 km^{2} (1.72 sq mi)
- Elevation: −1.0 m (−3.3 ft)

Population (2021)
  - Total: 85
  - Density: 19/km^{2} (49/sq mi)
- Time zone: UTC+1 (CET)
  - Summer (DST): UTC+2 (CEST)
- Postal code: 8658
- Dialing code: 0515

Greonterp is a small village in Súdwest-Fryslân municipality in the province of Friesland, the Netherlands. It had a population of around 85 in January 2017.

== History ==
The village was first mentioned in the 13th century as Grewingdorp. The etymology is unclear. Greonterp is a terp (artificial living hill) village from the early middle ages. It was located between lakes. The lake Sensmeer was poldered in 1633, however the village remained isolated. Later a small road was built to Blauwhuis on which the village was dependent.

The population of Greonterp remained Catholic after the Reformation. The medieval church had become Protestant. Church service was later decreased to once a year, and in 1751, the last sermon was held. The church was demolished in 1780. In 1822, a little bell tower was built on the cemetery.

Groenterp was home to 107 people in 1840. Before 2011, the village was part of the Wymbritseradiel municipality and before 1984 it was part of Wûnseradiel municipality.

== Notable people ==
The Dutch author Gerard Reve lived here from 1964 to 1971, and initially named his house Huize Algra after the politician Hendrik Algra who had labelled his writings blasphemous. Later, it was renamed Huize Het Gras after Isaiha 40:8.

== Gallery ==
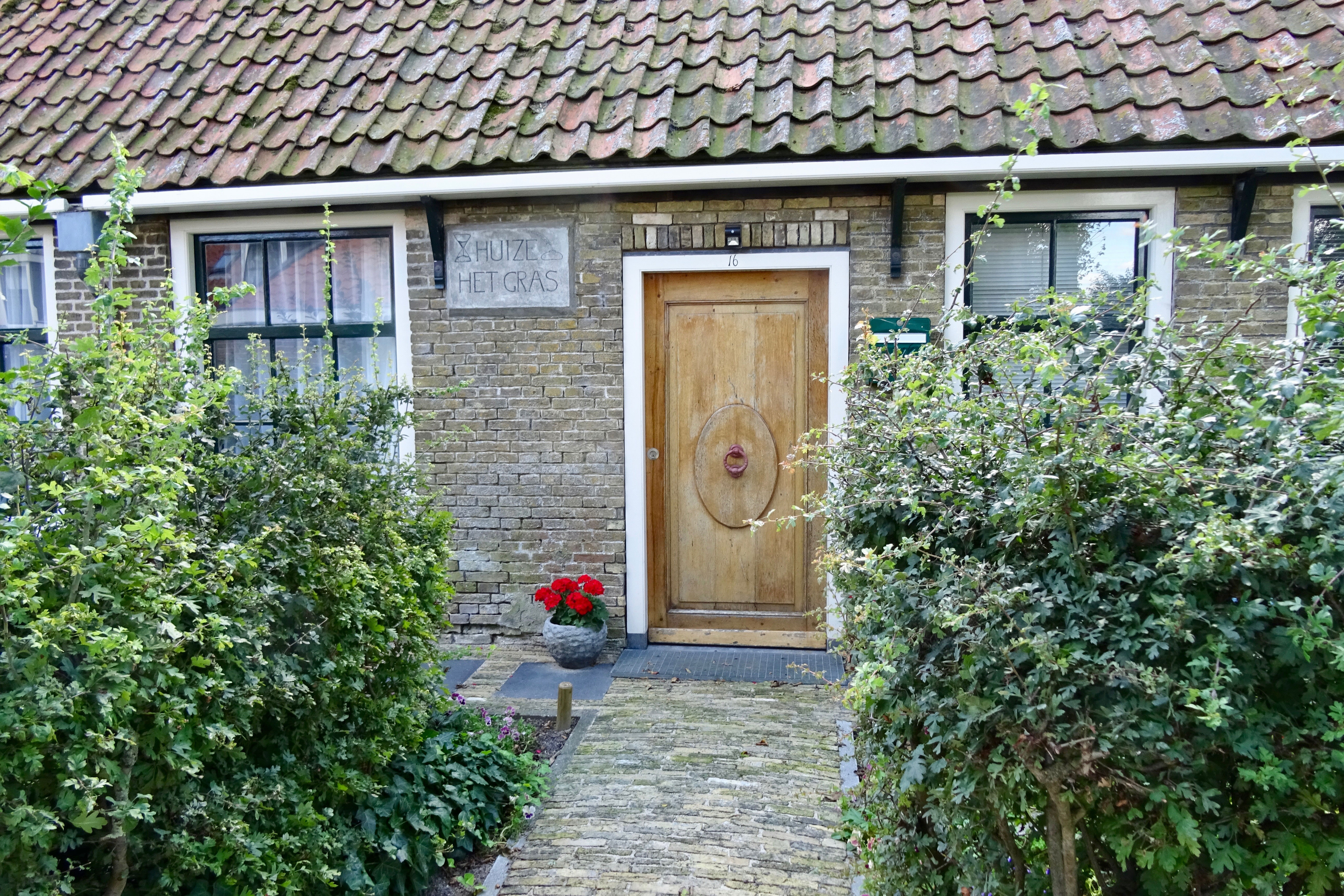
Huize Het Gras

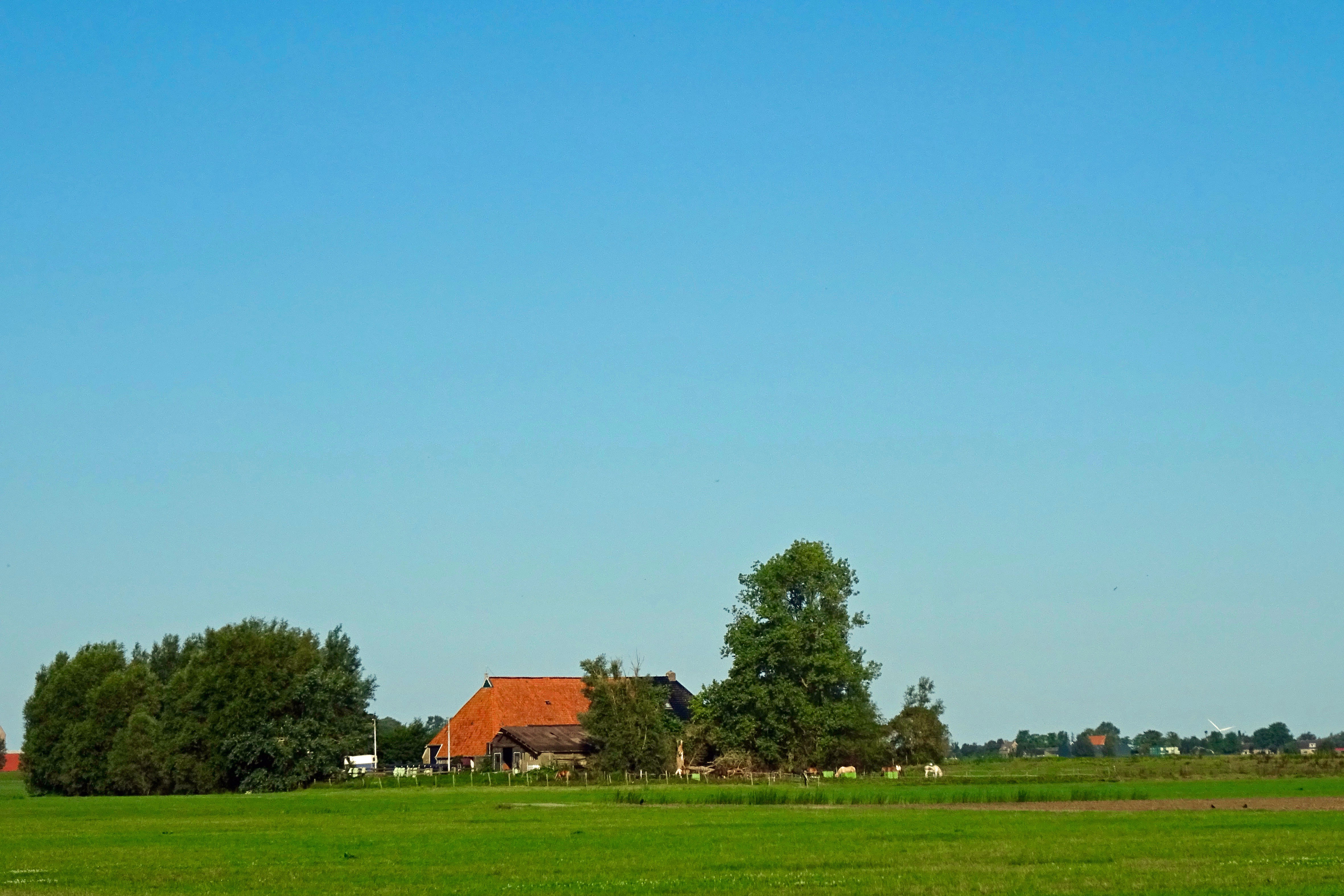
Farm near Greonterp

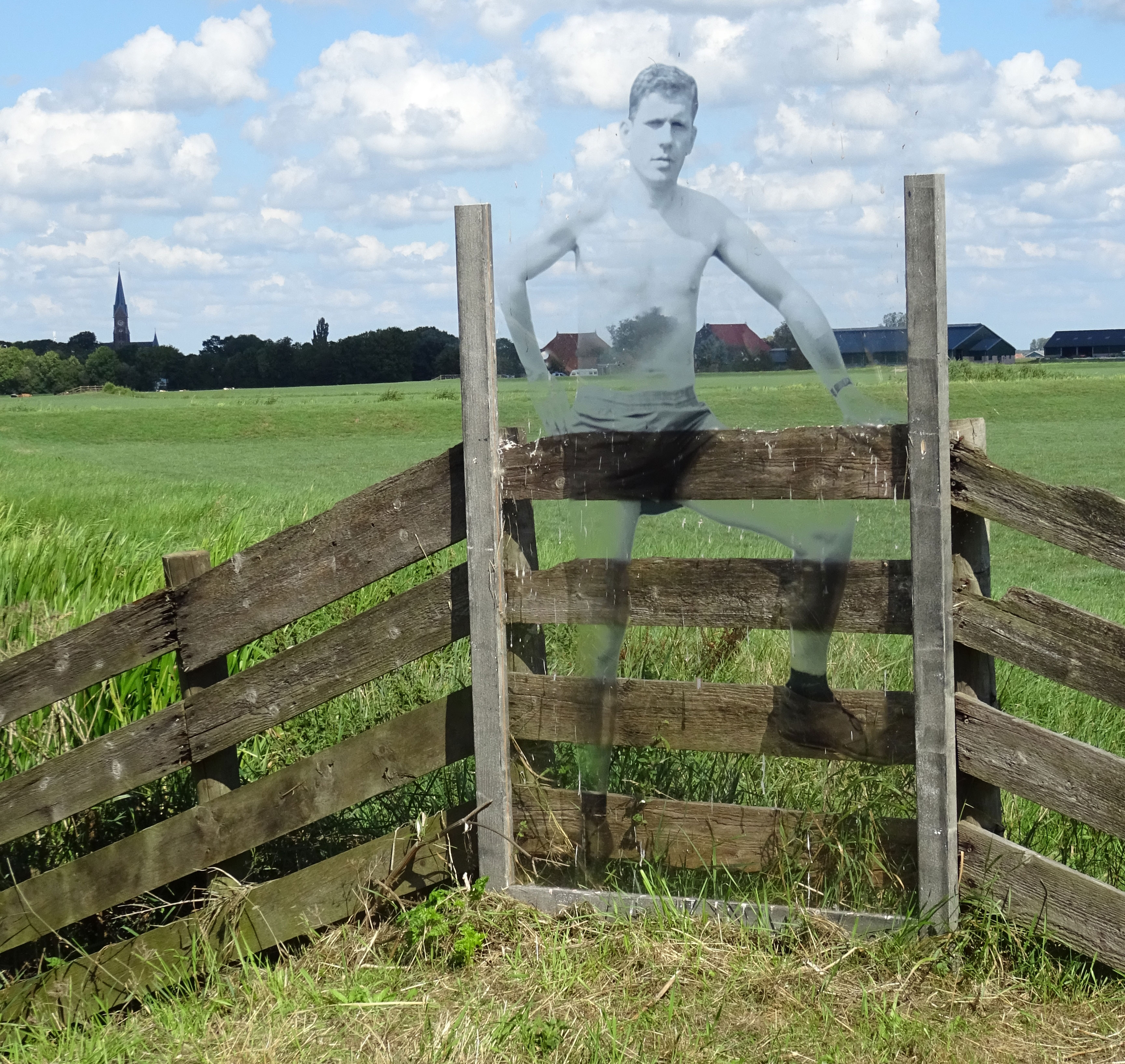
Glass Gerard Reve art work
