= Tjalhuizum =

Tjalhuizum Tsjalhuzum
- Village
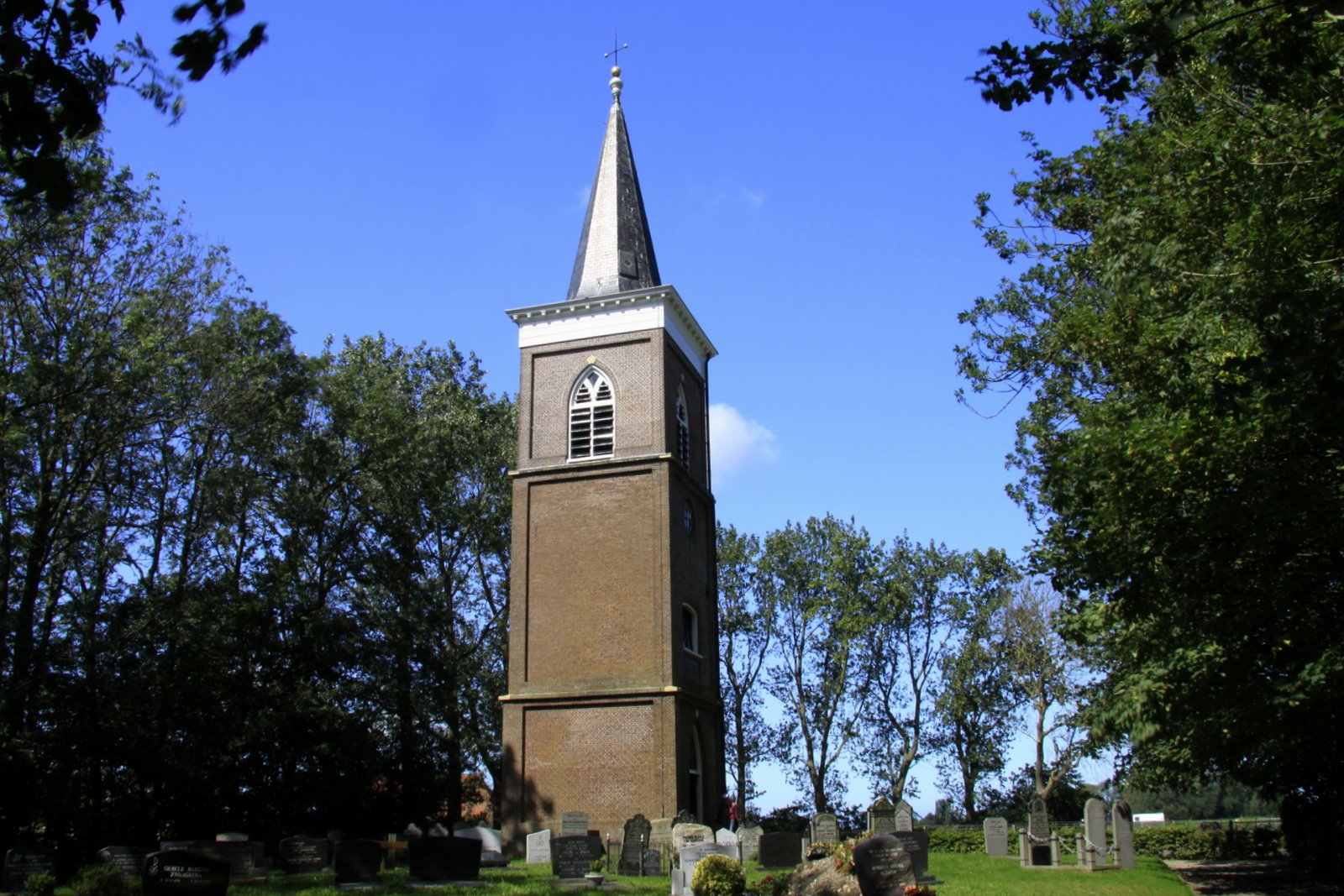
- Tjalhuizum Church Tower

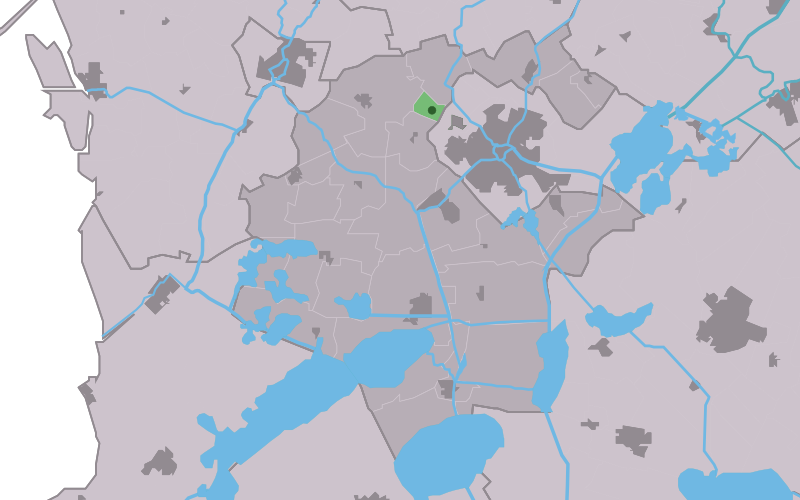
- Location in the former Wymbritseradiel municipality

- Location in the Netherlands Tjalhuizum (Netherlands)
- Country: Netherlands
- Province: Friesland
- Municipality: Súdwest-Fryslân

Area
  - Total: 0.96 km^{2} (0.37 sq mi)
- Elevation: 0.6 m (2.0 ft)

Population (2021)
  - Total: 20
  - Density: 21/km^{2} (54/sq mi)
- Time zone: UTC+1 (CET)
  - Summer (DST): UTC+2 (CEST)
- Postal code: 8772
- Dialing code: 0515

Tjalhuizum (West Frisian: Tsjalhuzum) is a small village in Súdwest-Fryslân in the province Friesland of the Netherlands. It had a population of around 25 in January 2017.

== History ==
The village was first mentioned in the 13th century as Tyelahusum, and means "settlement of Tjalle". The church was demolished in 1817, however the tower has remained standing.

Tjalhuizum was home to 51 people in 1840. In 1972, a 10 metres (33 ft) high World War II monument has been placed in Tjalhuizum along the IJsbrechtum naar Nijland. The monument serves as a remembrance for the lost lives in the municipality of Wymbritseradiel. Annually on 4 May, the school children from IJsbrechtum and Nijland walk to the monument, observe two of minutes of silence at 20:00 followed by the signing of the Frisian anthem. Before 2011, the village was part of the Wymbritseradiel municipality.

== Gallery ==
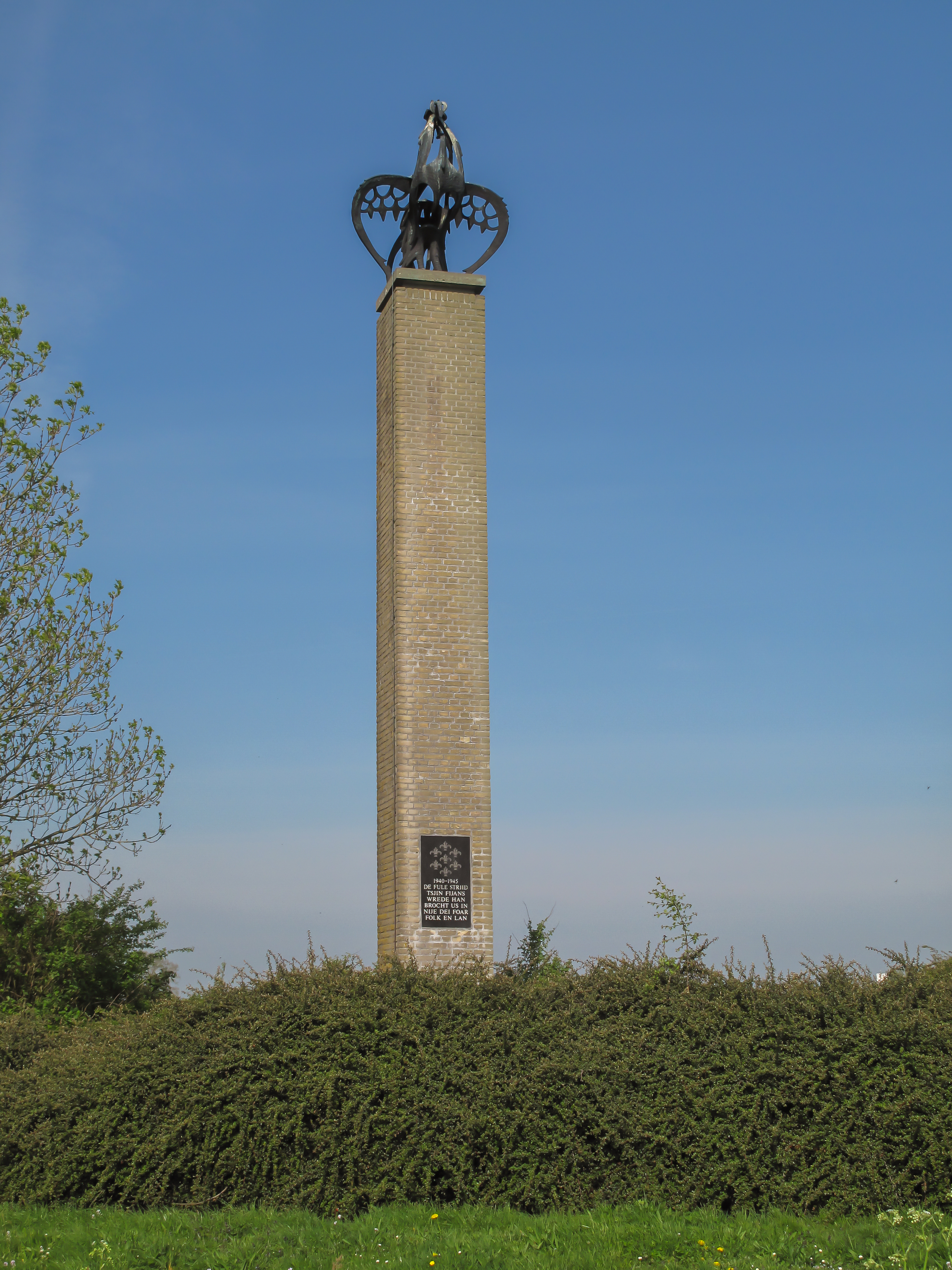
Tsjalhuzum, war monument
