= Turn =

To turn is to rotate, either continuously like a wheel turns on its axle, or in a finite motion changing an object's orientation. Turn may also refer to:

== Sports and games ==
- Turn (game), a segment of a game
- Turn (poker), the fourth of five community cards
- Turn (dance and gymnastics), rotation of the body
- Turn (swimming), reversing direction at the end of a pool
- Turn (professional wrestling), a transition between face and heel
- Turn, a quality of spin bowling in cricket

== Science and technology ==
- Turn (knot), a component of a knot
- Turning, shaping wood or metal using a lathe
- Turn (biochemistry), an element of secondary structure in proteins
- Turn (unit), a unit of angle
- Traversal Using Relays around NAT (TURN), a computer network protocol
- A loop of wire in an electromagnetic coil

== Entertainment ==
=== Film and television ===
- Turn (film), a 2001 Japanese film
- The Turn (film), a 2012 short film
- Turn: Washington's Spies, a 2014 television series on AMC, which takes place during the American Revolutionary War
- "The Turn", an episode of One Day at a Time (2017 TV series)

=== Literature ===
- Turn (poetry), or volta, a major shift in a poem's rhetorical and/or dramatic trajectory
- The Turn (novel), a 1902 novel by Luigi Pirandello
- The Turn, an epidemic in Kim Harrison's Hollows series

=== Music ===
- Turn (band), an Irish rock group
- Turn (music), a sequence of adjacent notes in the scale
- Turn, a type of musical ornament

==== Albums ====
- Turn (The Ex album), 2004
- Turn (Great Big Sea album), 1999
- Turn (Roscoe Mitchell album) or the title song, 2005
- Turn (Turn album), 2005
- The Turn (Alison Moyet album), 2007
- The Turn (Live album), 2014
- The Turn (Taxi Violence album) or the title song, 2009
- The Turn, by Amber Pacific, 2014
- The Turn, by Fredo Viola, 2008

==== Songs ====
- "Turn" (Feeder song), 2001
- "Turn" (Therapy? song), 1993
- "Turn" (Travis song), 1999
- "Turn" (The Wombats song), 2017
- "Turn", by Christie Front Drive from Christie Front Drive, 1994
- "Turn", by Dramatis from For Future Reference, 1981
- "Turn", by Hexedene from Choking on Lilies, 1997
- "Turn", by New Order from Waiting for the Sirens' Call, 2005

== Places ==
- Turn, Kočevje, a former settlement in Slovenia
- Tirns, (West Frisian: Turns) a village in the Netherlands

== Other uses ==
- Johannes Türn (1899–1993), Estonian chess player
- Turn (policy debate), an argument that proves the opposite
- TURN (The Utility Reform Network), a consumer advocacy organization in California, US

== See also ==
- Tern (disambiguation)
- Tourn, the patrol circuit made by sheriffs in medieval England
- Turn, Turn, Turn (disambiguation)
- Turn-by-turn navigation
