= Terms (law) =

In legal terminology, Terms can have different meanings, depending on the specific context. In a general sense, a "term" is a word used in the sense of "terminology" or in the phrase "term of art". In Kirkland and Son v. Nesbit and Co., Lord Campbell observed that in court, "there is no doubt that the meaning of any term of art may be asked of a witness".

In specific legal contexts, "terms" has various meanings relevant to the situation at hand:

- In trust law, "terms" generally refers to the Terms of the Trust, meaning the explicit written intention of the Grantor of a Trust. Terms are limited to provisions expressed in a way that makes them like proof in court. Terms of a Trust are most clear when they are explicit within the four corners of the Trust Instrument. However, since not all Trusts are explicit, some interpretation by courts may be necessary.
- In contract law, "terms" means Terms of a Contract, the conditions and warranties agreed upon between parties to the contract. Contract terms may be verbal or expressed in writing. Conditions are those terms which are so important that one or more of the parties would not enter into the contract without them. Warranties are less important terms whose violation does not void the contract, but might entitle one of the parties to receive monetary damages.
- In contract law, property law and constitutional law, "term" may mean a period of time over which a lease, office, or other privilege is held, for example in "fixed-term contract".
