= Scharnegoutum =

Scharnegoutum Skearnegoutum
- Village
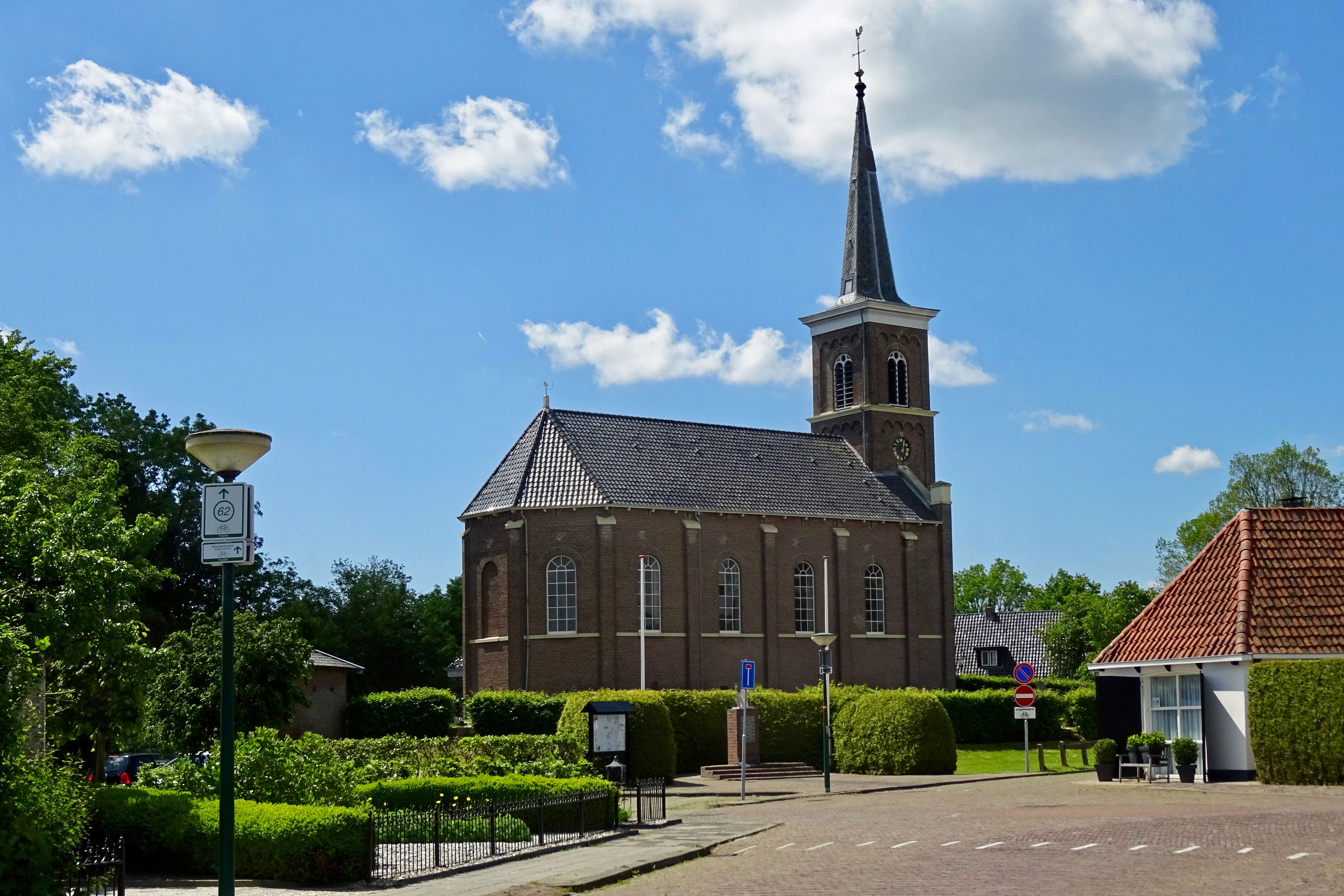

- Flag Coat of arms

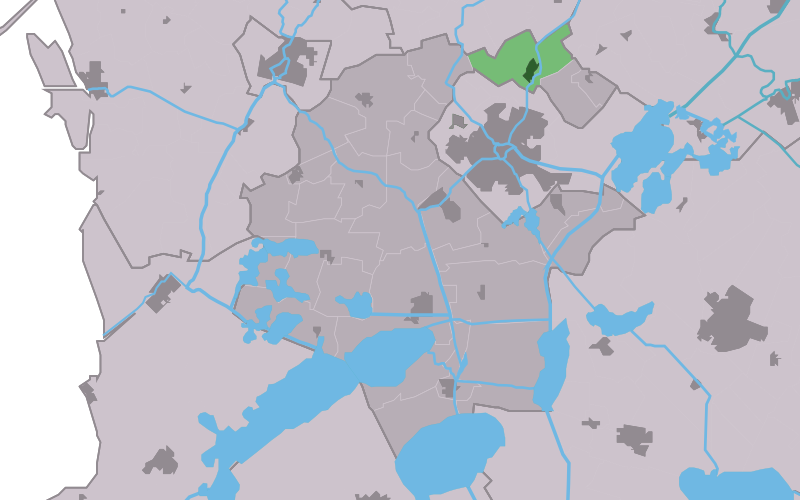
- Location in the former Wymbritseradiel municipality

- Location in the Netherlands Scharnegoutum (Netherlands)
- Country: Netherlands
- Province: Friesland
- Municipality: Súdwest-Fryslân

Area
  - Total: 6.76 km^{2} (2.61 sq mi)
- Elevation: 0.2 m (0.66 ft)

Population (2021)
  - Total: 1,630
  - Density: 241/km^{2} (625/sq mi)
- Time zone: UTC+1 (CET)
  - Summer (DST): UTC+2 (CEST)
- Postal code: 8629
- Dialing code: 0515
- Website: Official

Scharnegoutum (West Frisian: Skearnegoutum) is a village in Súdwest Fryslân in the province of Friesland, the Netherlands. It had a population of around 1,660 in January 2017.

== History ==
Scharnegoutum is built upon a man-made hill (called a terp in Dutch). During excavations of the hill objects from the 4th century were found. The village was at one time beside the Middelzee until this was drained in about 1300. In the Middle Ages Scharnegoutum possessed a covenant, similar to the situation in the villages Loaiïngea, Goaiïngea, Gau, and Offingawier. Scharnegoutum had a train station from 1883 until 1938, on the railway line Leeuwarden - Stavoren. On June 1, 1940 the station reopened, but on November 24 of that year it closed again. In 1897, the Dairy Cooperative factory Scharnegoutum was founded. In 1972 this factory was closed. Before 2011, the village was part of the Wymbritseradiel municipality.

== Population ==
- 1954 - 1,031
- 1959 - 1,002
- 1964 - 955
- 1969 - 1.020
- 1974 - 996
- 2006 - 1,677

== Gallery ==
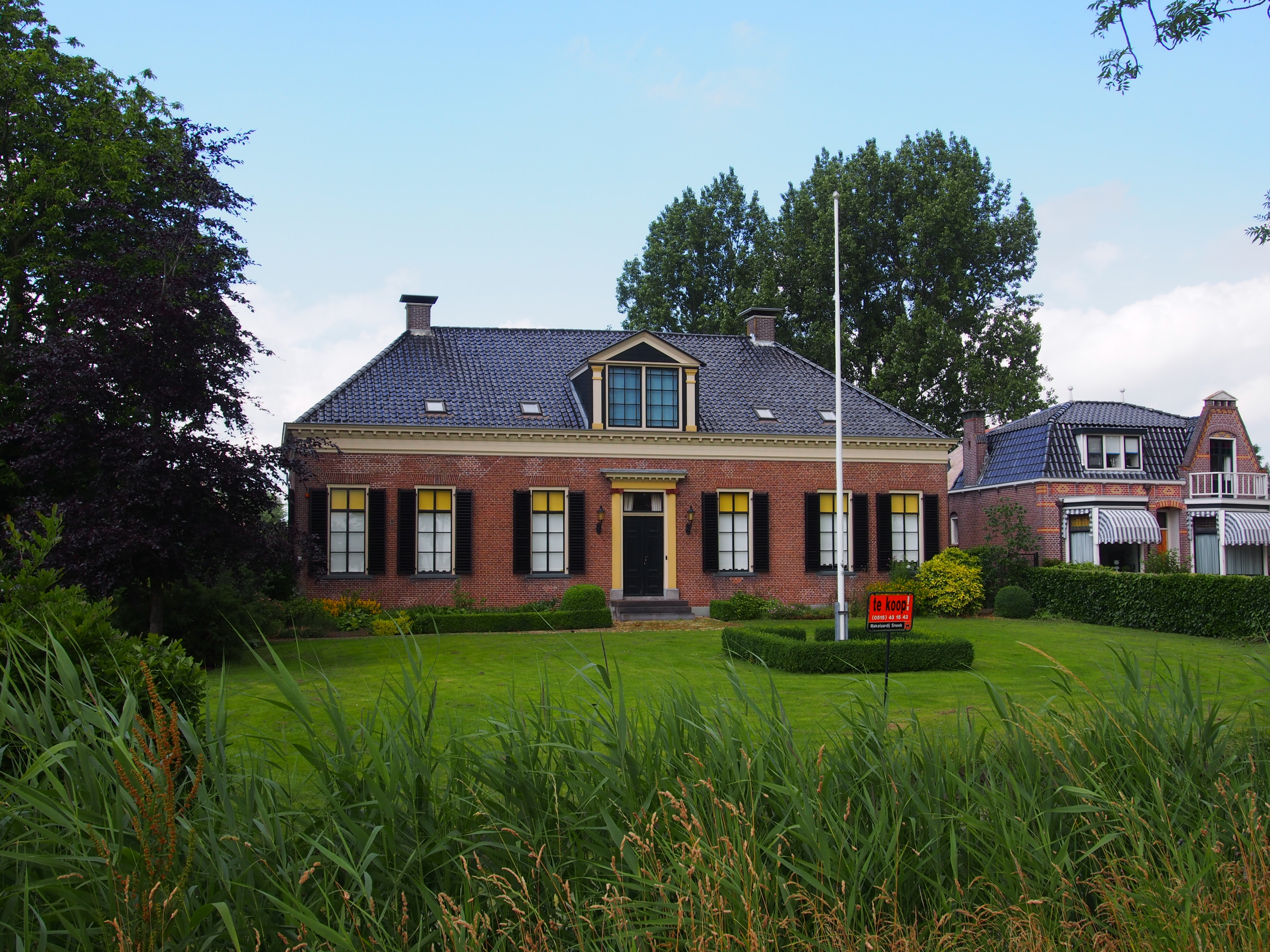
Villa in Scharnegoutum

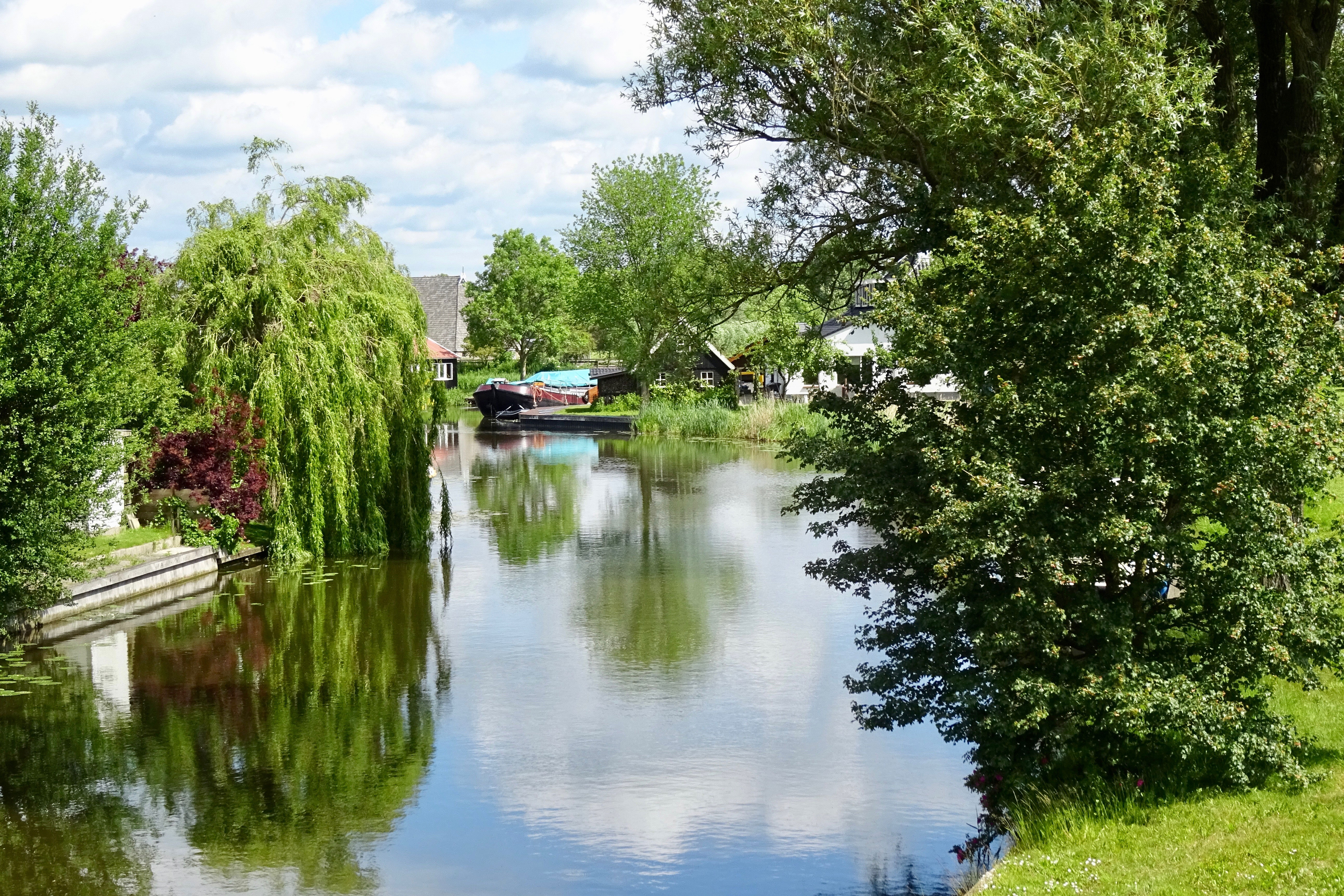
Canal view

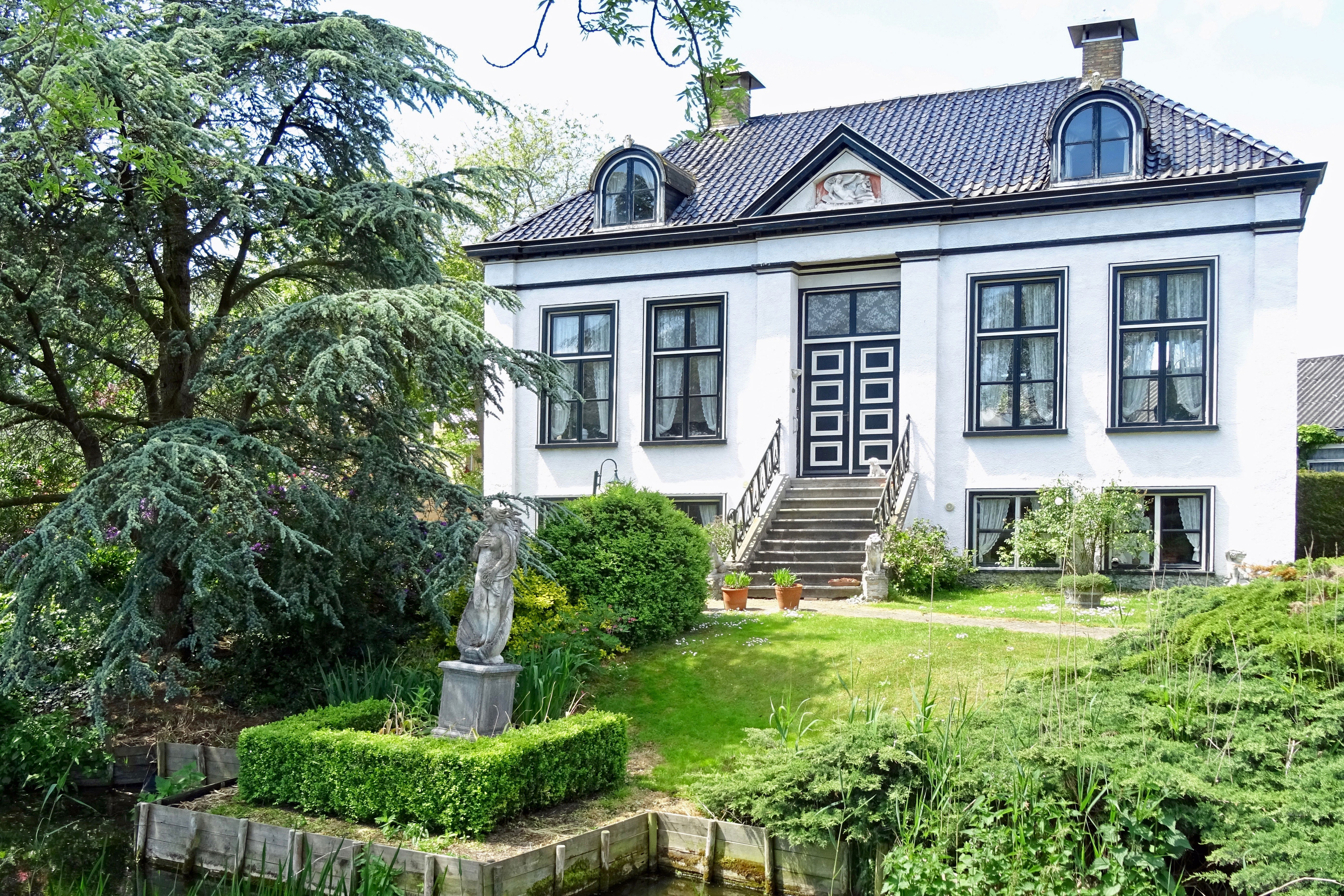
Villa in Scharnegoutum

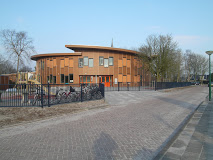
School in Scharnegoutum

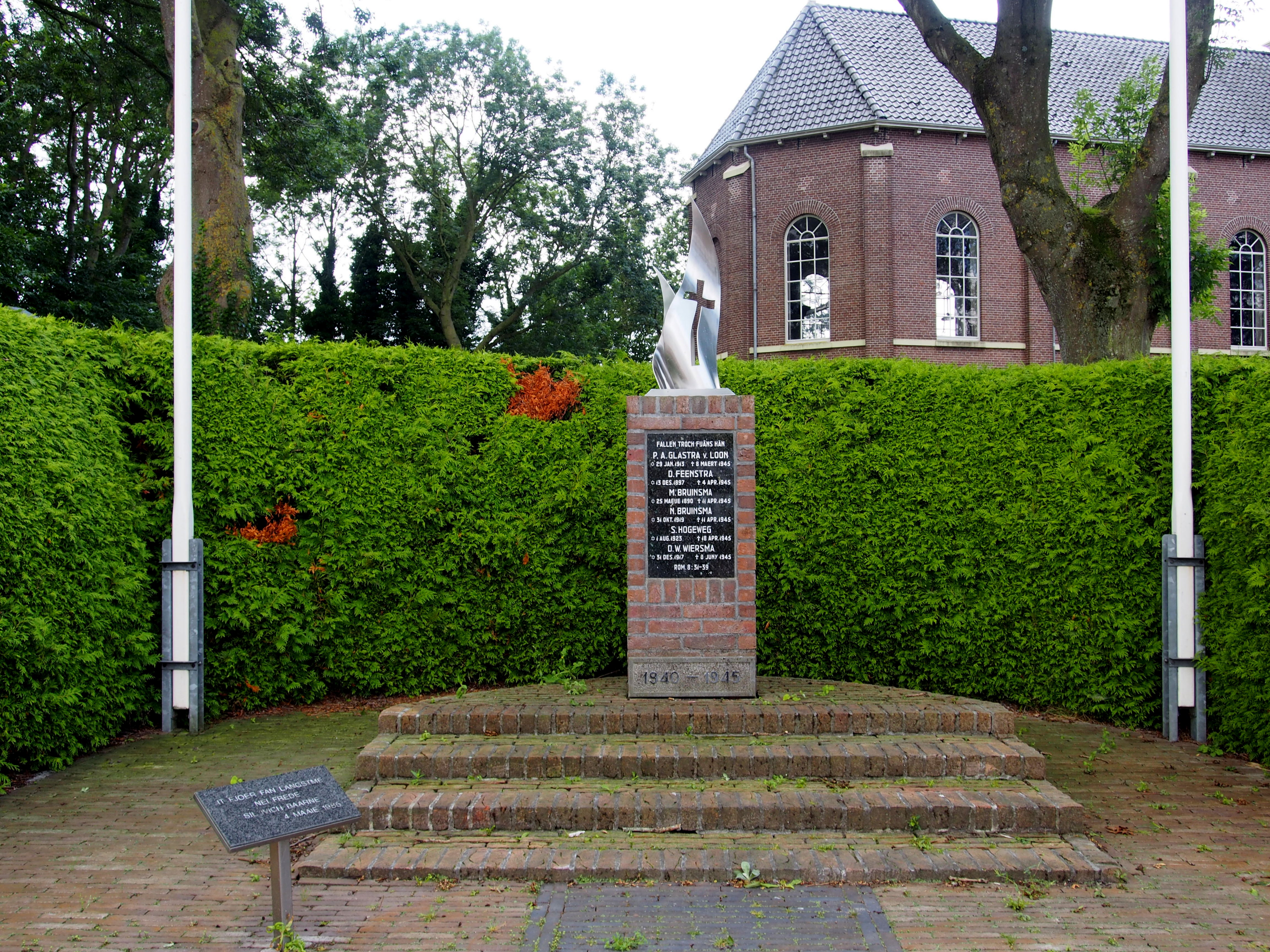
Memorial at Martens' church
