= Terme (disambiguation) =

Terme may refer to:

- Terme, a town in Turkey
- Terme District, a district in Turkey
- Terme River, a river in Turkey
- Gökçeören, a village in Turkey formerly called Terme
- Terme section of Chianciano Terme, Italy

== See also ==
- Term (disambiguation)
- Termeh, a type of textile
