= Smallebrugge =

Smallebrugge Smelbrêge
- Village
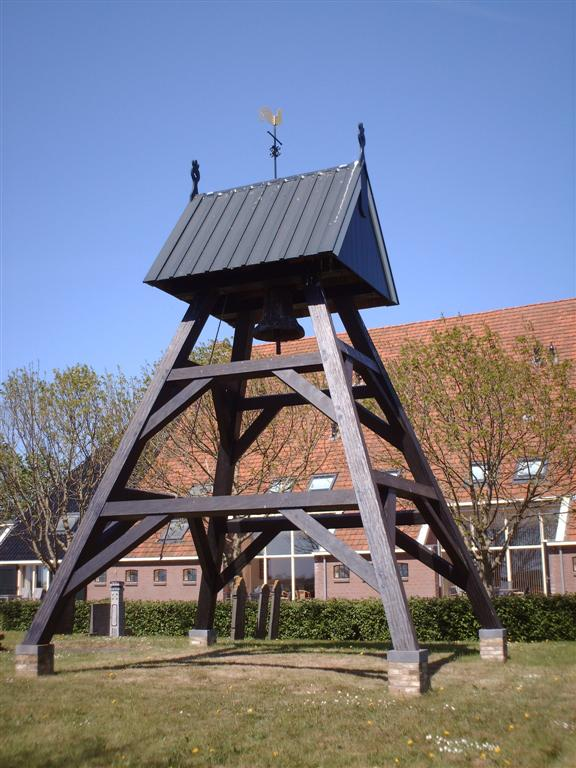
- Bellfray

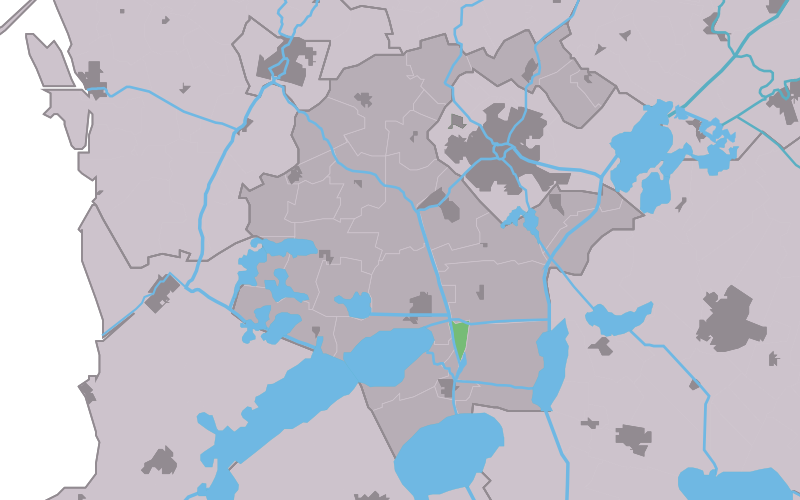
- Location in the former Wymbritseradiel municipality

- Location in the Netherlands Smallebrugge (Netherlands)
- Country: Netherlands
- Province: Friesland
- Municipality: Súdwest-Fryslân

Area
  - Total: 1.00 km^{2} (0.39 sq mi)
- Elevation: −0.1 m (−0.33 ft)

Population (2021)
  - Total: 25
  - Density: 25/km^{2} (65/sq mi)
- Time zone: UTC+1 (CET)
  - Summer (DST): UTC+2 (CEST)
- Postal code: 8552
- Dialing code: 0514

Smallebrugge (West Frisian: Smelbrêge) is a village in Súdwest-Fryslân in the province of Friesland, the Netherlands. It had a population of around 20 in January 2017.

== History ==
The village was first mentioned in 1422 as "toe der Smalerbrugghen", and means "narrow bridge". Smallebrugge is a little agricultural community which developed during the late middle ages.

Smallebrugge used to have a church in 1716, but it was later demolished leaving only a bell tower. The bell tower was rebuilt in 1963 and again in 2005.

Smallebrugge was home to 25 people in 1840. In 1848, it was connected to the Sneek to Lemmer road with a little road. Before 2011, the village was part of the Wymbritseradiel municipality.
