= Turn, Turn, Turn =

Turn, Turn, Turn may refer to:

- "Turn! Turn! Turn!", a 1959 song by Pete Seeger that later became a hit for The Byrds
- Turn! Turn! Turn! (album), an album by The Byrds
- "Turn, Turn, Turn" (CSI), an episode of the TV series CSI: Crime Scene Investigation
- "Turn! Turn! Turn!" (True Blood), a 2012 episode of the TV series True Blood
- "Turn, Turn, Turn", an episode of the TV series 7th Heaven
- "Turn, Turn, Turn" (Agents of S.H.I.E.L.D.), a 2014 American television episode

== See also ==
- Turn (disambiguation)
