= Wymbritseradiel =

Wymbritseradeel Wymbritseradiel
- Former municipality
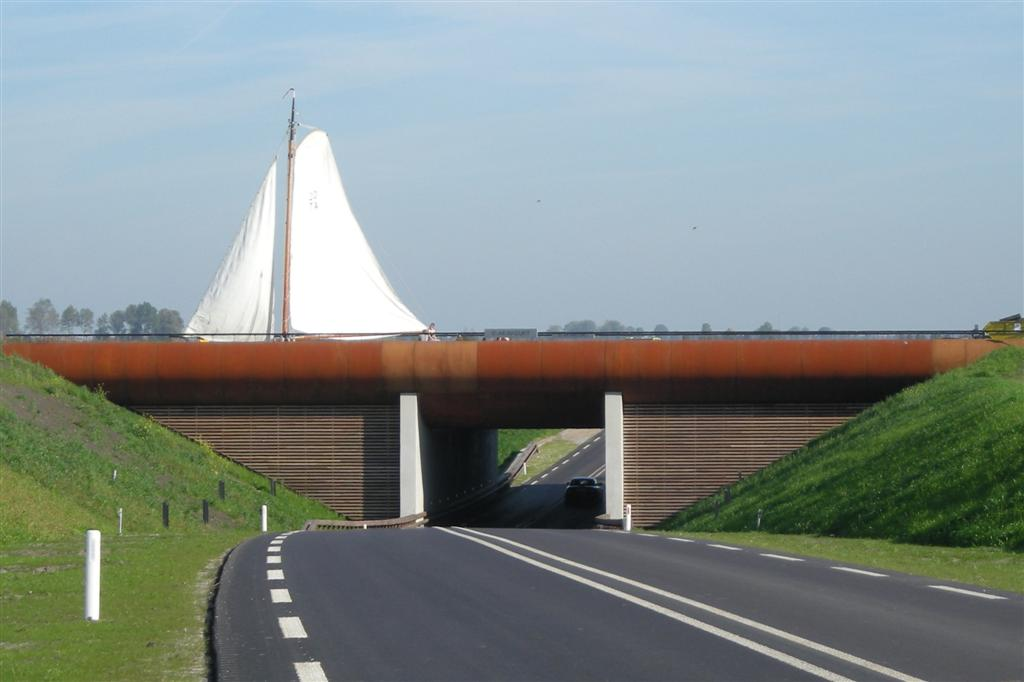
- Aqueduct

- Flag Coat of arms

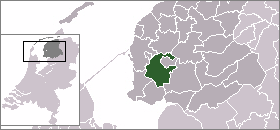
- Coordinates: 53°1′N 5°37′E
- Country: Netherlands
- Province: Friesland
- Municipality: Súdwest-Fryslân

Area (2006)
  - Total: 162.74 km^{2} (62.83 sq mi)
  - Land: 138.33 km^{2} (53.41 sq mi)
  - Water: 24.41 km^{2} (9.42 sq mi)

Population (1 January 2007)
  - Total: 16,136
  - Density: 117/km^{2} (300/sq mi)
- Source: CBS, Statline.
- Time zone: UTC+1 (CET)
  - Summer (DST): UTC+2 (CEST)

Wymbritseradeel (Dutch: [ˈʋimbrɪtsəraːˌdeːl]; official West Frisian: Wymbritseradiel [ˈʋimbrɪtsəraˌdiəl]) was a rural municipality (Dutch: gemeenten) in the Dutch province of Friesland from 1984 until 2011. An earlier type of municipality (Dutch: grietenij) of the same name existed from 1500 until 1984.

== History ==
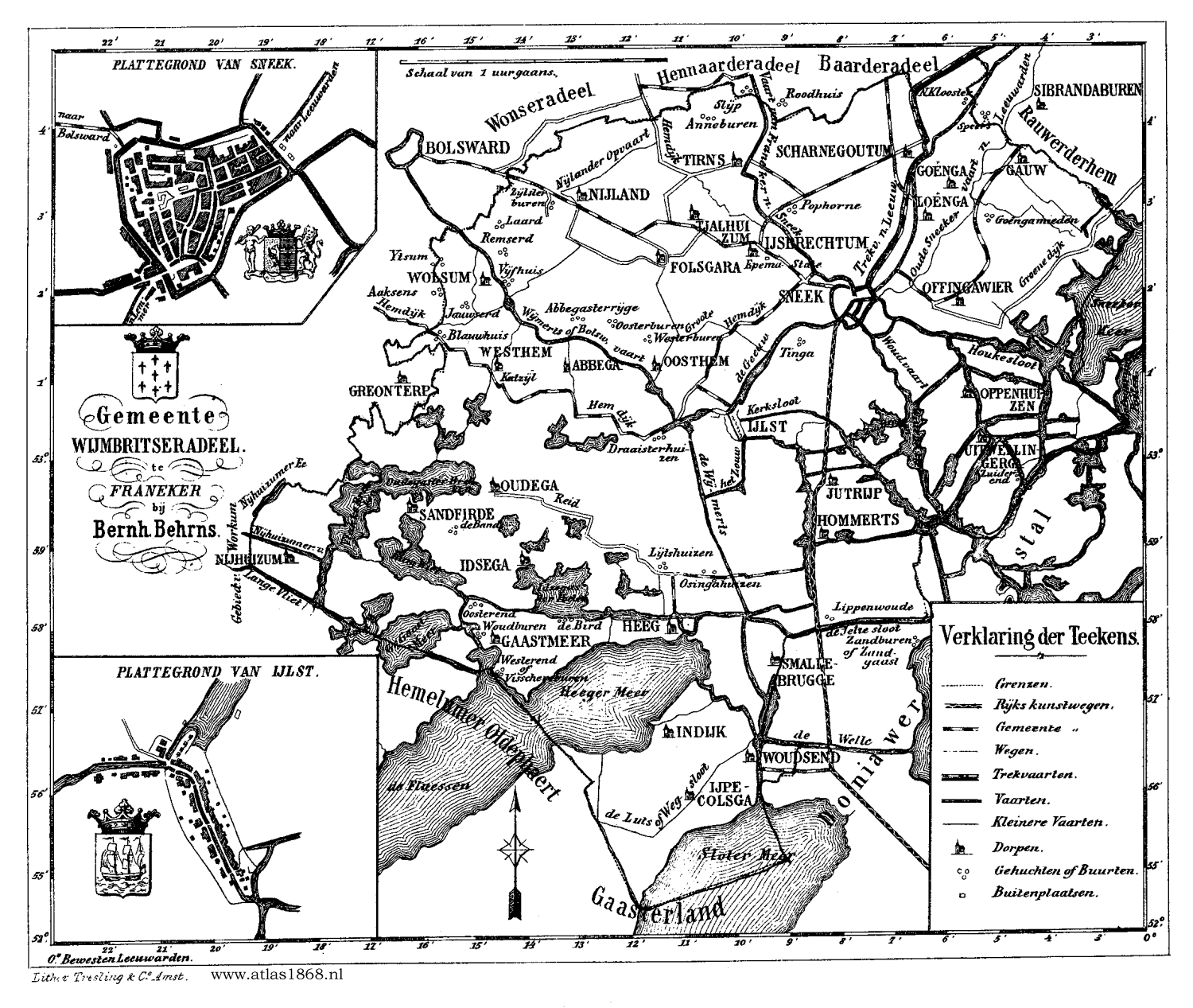
Early map of Wymbritseradeel

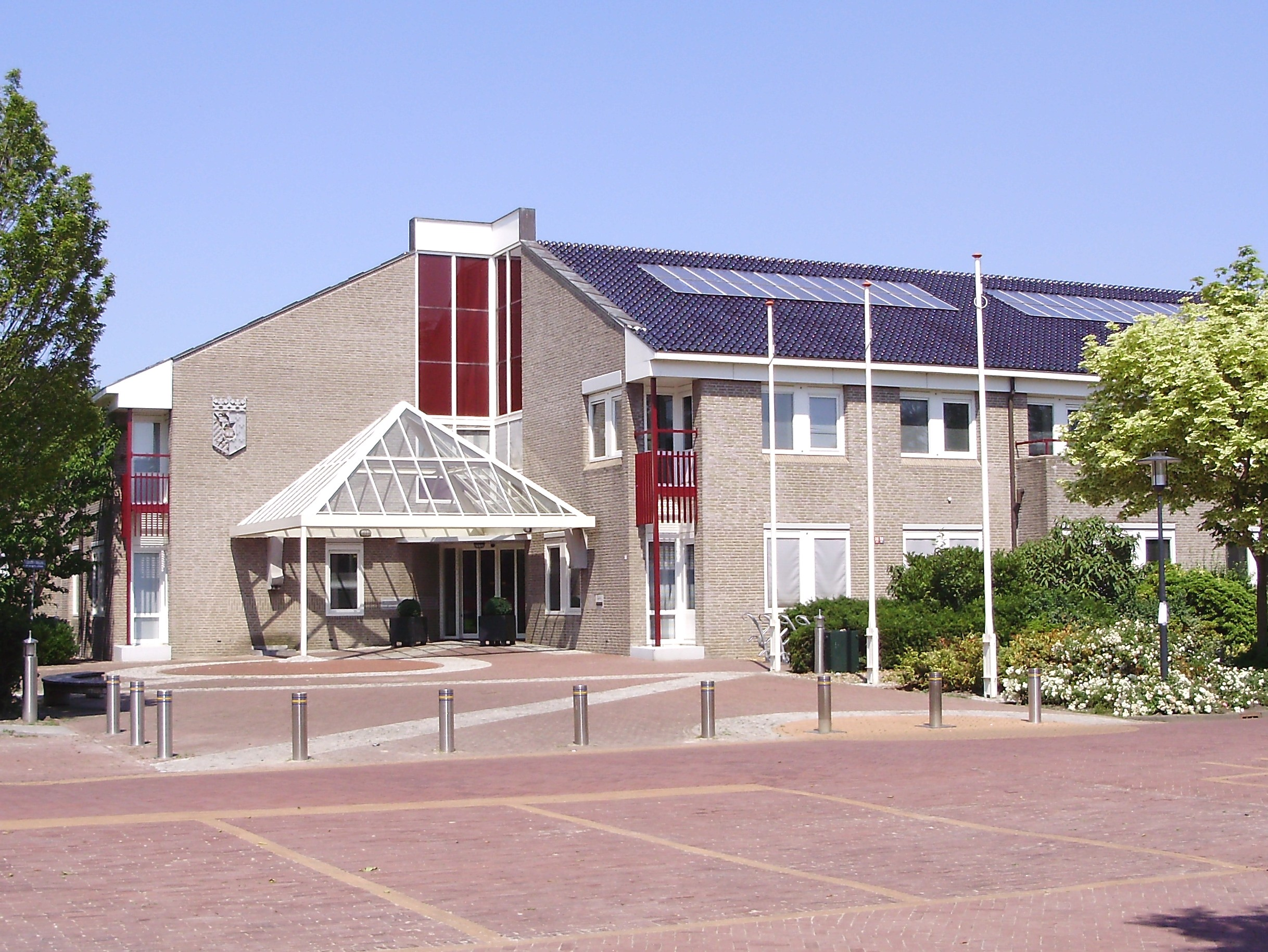
Old town hall

Wymbritseradeel was formed from the division of the medieval district of Waghenbrugghe. The grietenij of Wymbritseradeel was created in 1500 as Frisian cities became independent and several grietenij were split on the south side of the area. The boundaries of Wymbritseradeel remained unchanged until 1984. From 1625 until the introduction of the municipal law in 1851, the grietman of Wymbritseradeel lived in the stins of Epemastate in IJsbrechtum (West Frisian: Ysbrechtum).

The modern municipality of Wymbritseradeel was formed as part of the municipal reorganization of Friesland in January 1984. The previous grietenij was merged with the grietenij of IJlst, parts of Doniawerstal, and the villages Greonterp, Koufurderrige, Smallebrugge, and Wonseradeel. The town of IJlst (West Frisian: Drylts) was the administrative seat.

In 2011, the municipality merged with the neighboring municipalities of Bolsward, Nijefurd, Sneek and Wûnseradiel to form Southwest Friesland.

=== Spelling ===
Since 1986, the official name of the municipality was the Frisian-language Wymbritseradiel. However, the Dutch name Wymbritseradeel is sometimes used as a distinction for the old municipality prior to 1984.

== Towns and villages ==
The former municipality had 28 official districts (Dutch: kernen):

Dutch name	Frisian name	Population (2009)
IJlst	Drylts	3219
Heeg	Heech	2293
Scharnegoutum	Skearnegoutum	1683
Woudsend	Wâldsein	1375
Oppenhuizen	Toppenhuzen	1112
Nijland	Nijlân	1033
Oudega	Aldegea	681
Hommerts	De Hommerts	628
Blauwhuis	Blauhûs	513
Oosthem	Easthim	438
Uitwellingerga	Twellingea	401
Gauw	Gau	360
Folsgare	Folsgeare	335
Jutrijp	Jutryp	320
Gaastmeer	De Gaastmar	287
Abbega	Abbegea	262
Goënga	Goaiïngea	258
Tirns	Turns	179
Wolsum	Wolsum	138
Indijk	Yndyk	123
Koufurderrige	Koufurderrige	96
Westhem	Westhim	86
Greonterp	Greonterp	84
Ypecolsga	Ypekolsgea	69
Idzega	Idzegea	28
Tjalhuizum	Tsjalhuzum	25
Sandfirden	Sânfurd	18
Smallebrugge	Smelbrêge	10

The municipality also contained the following hamlets:

- Abbegaasterketting (Abbegeasterketting)
- Anneburen (Annebuorren)
- Draaisterhuizen (Draeisterhuzen)
- Feyteburen (Feytebuorren)
- Jouswerd
- Kleine Gaastmeer (De Lytse Gaastmar)
- Lippenwoude
- Lytshuizen
- Nijeklooster (Nykleaster)
- Nijezijl (Nijesyl)
- Osingahuizen (Osingahuzen)
- Piekezijl (Pikesyl)
- Remswerd
- Vijfhuis (Fijfhûs)
- Vissersburen (Fiskersbuorren)
- Wolsumerketting
