= Koufurderrige =

- Village
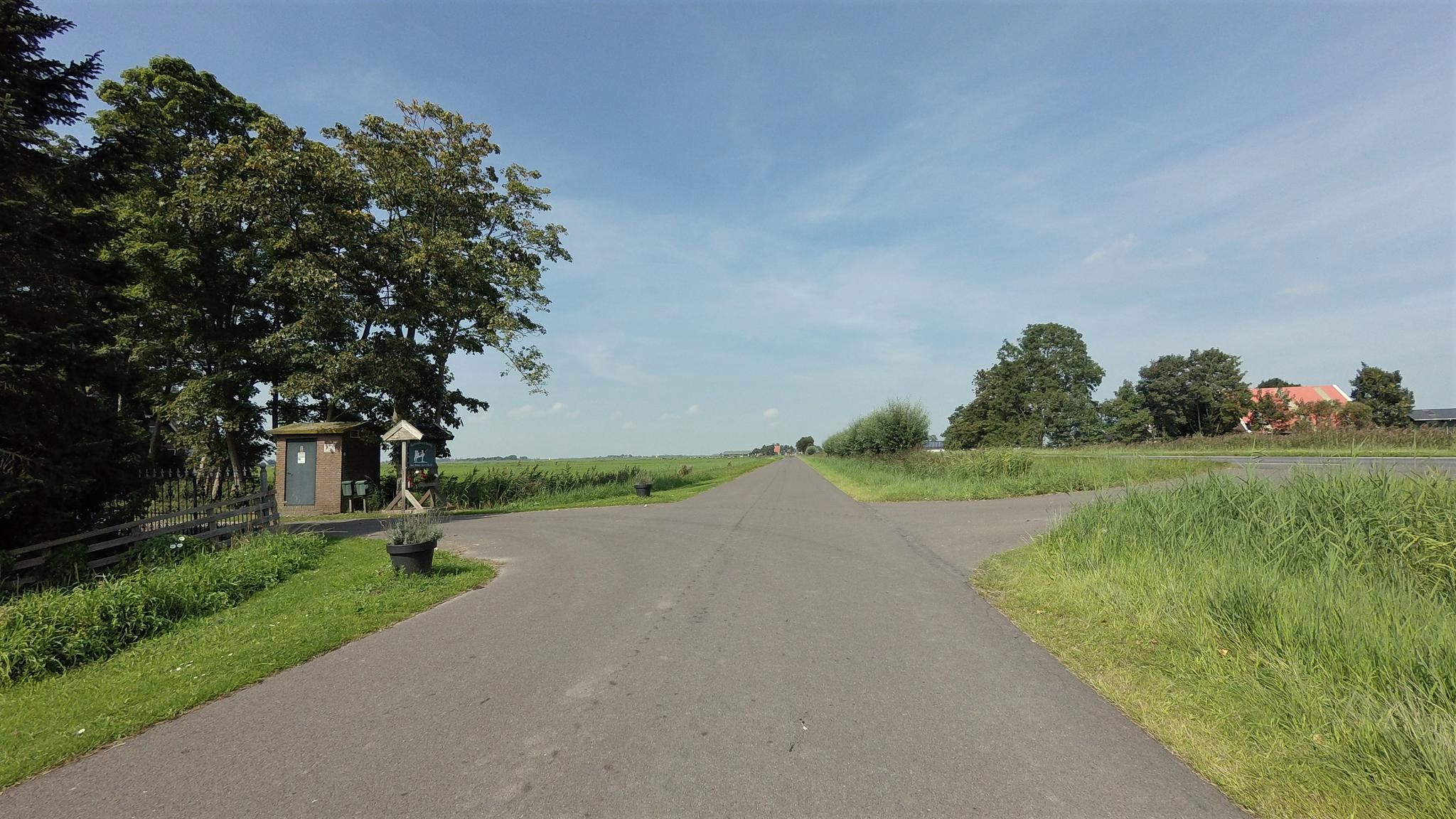

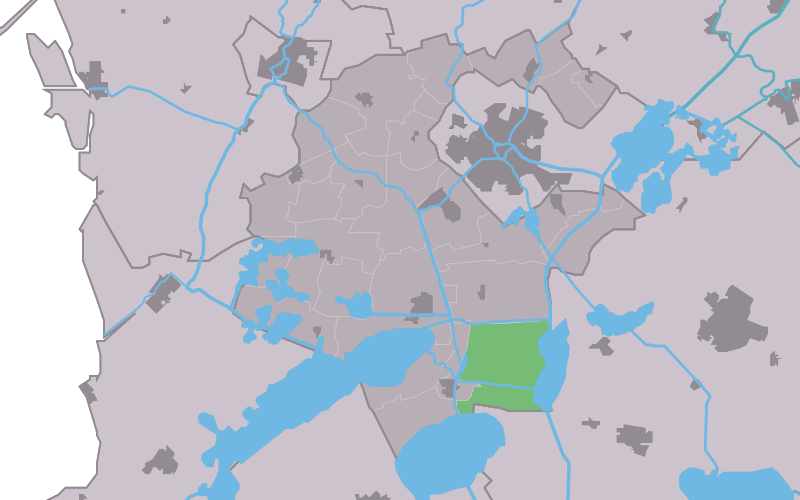
- Location in the former Wymbritseradiel municipality

- Location in the Netherlands Koufurderrige (Netherlands)
- Country: Netherlands
- Province: Friesland
- Municipality: Súdwest-Fryslân

Area
  - Total: 13.09 km^{2} (5.05 sq mi)
- Elevation: −0.1 m (−0.33 ft)

Population (2021)
  - Total: 135
  - Density: 10.3/km^{2} (26.7/sq mi)
- Time zone: UTC+1 (CET)
  - Summer (DST): UTC+2 (CEST)
- Postal code: 8529
- Dialing code: 0514

Koufurderrige is a village in Súdwest-Fryslân municipality in the province of Friesland, the Netherlands. It had a population of around 115 in January 2017.

== History ==
The village was first mentioned in 1543 as koefoerde, and means "row of houses near the fordable place for cows". See also: Coevorden. Koufurderrige is a recent settlement which developed into a village after World War II. It was located near a shallow lake.

Koufurderrige was home to 17 people in 1840 as was labelled as Oostsmallebrugge. Before 2011, the village was part of the Wymbritseradiel municipality and before 1984 it belonged to Doniawerstal.
