= Folsgare =

Folsgare Folsgeare
- Village
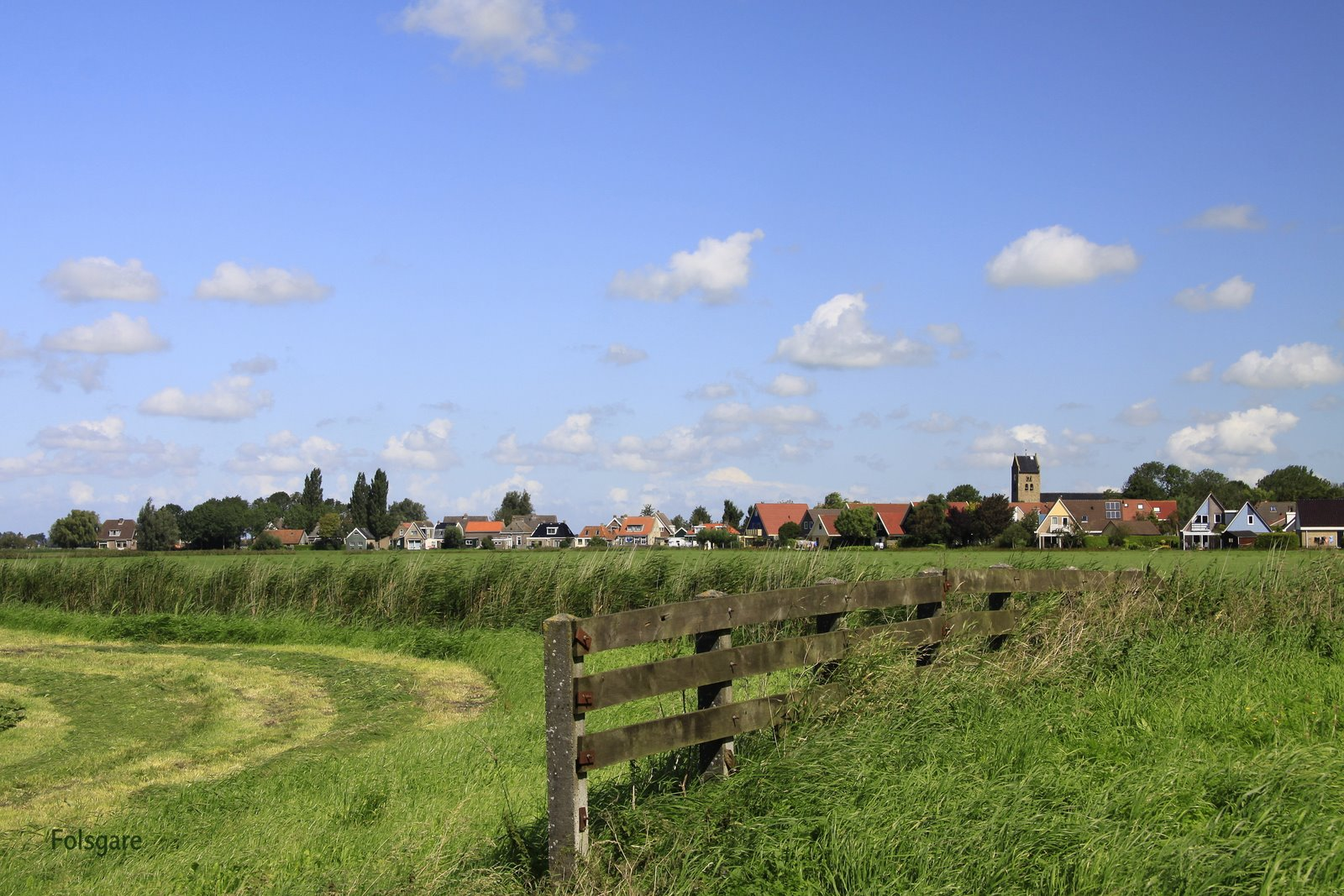

- Coat of arms

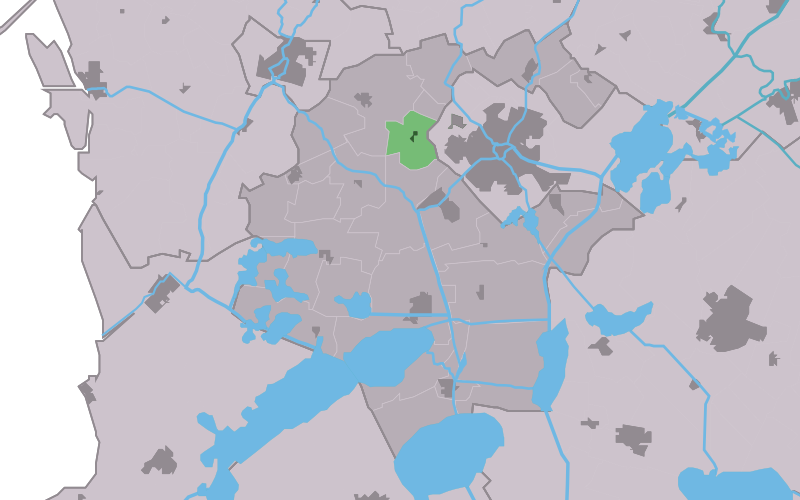
- Location in the former Wymbritseradiel municipality

- Location in the Netherlands Folsgare (Netherlands)
- Country: Netherlands
- Province: Friesland
- Municipality: Súdwest-Fryslân

Area
  - Total: 3.83 km^{2} (1.48 sq mi)
- Elevation: 0.2 m (0.66 ft)

Population (2021)
  - Total: 335
  - Density: 87.5/km^{2} (227/sq mi)
- Time zone: UTC+1 (CET)
  - Summer (DST): UTC+2 (CEST)
- Postal code: 8773
- Dialing code: 0515

Folsgare (West Frisian: Folsgeare) is a village in Súdwest-Fryslân in the province of Friesland, the Netherlands. It had a population of around 325 in January 2017.

== History ==
The village was first mentioned in the 13th century as Ffoldesgara and means "tapering pieces of land of Foldo (person)". Folsgare is a terp (artificial living hill) village which developed in the middle ages. It was located near the former Middelzee. The village was well connected to the outside world by waterways.

In 1498, Folsgare was attacked by the Vetkopers who burned down the church causing the death of two villagers who had been hiding in the tower. The current church dates from 1875.

Folsgare was home to 141 people in 1840. Before 2011, the village was part of the Wymbritseradiel municipality. In the 21st century, the city of Sneek has extended its industrial zone to close to the village.

== Gallery ==
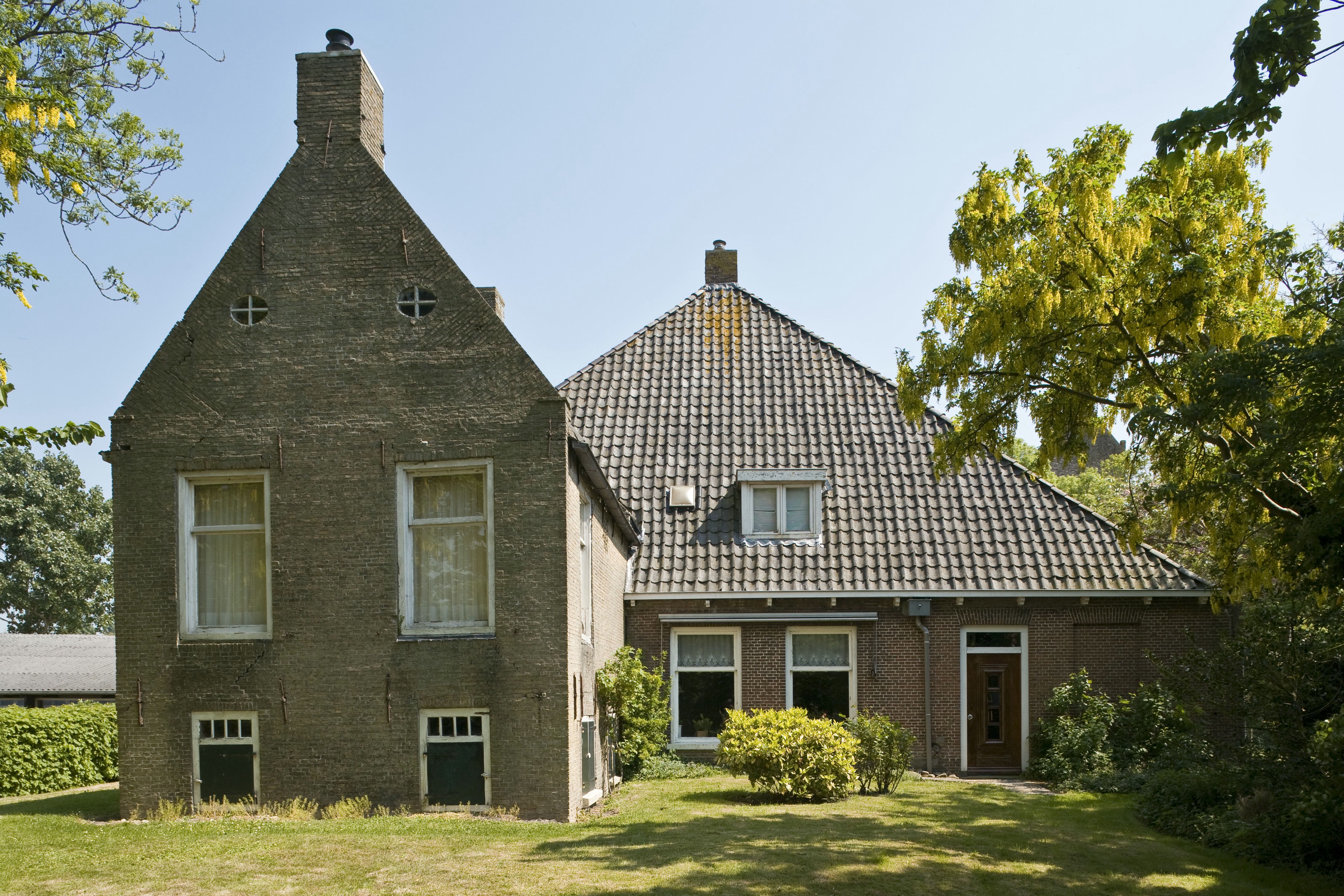
Farm in Folsgare

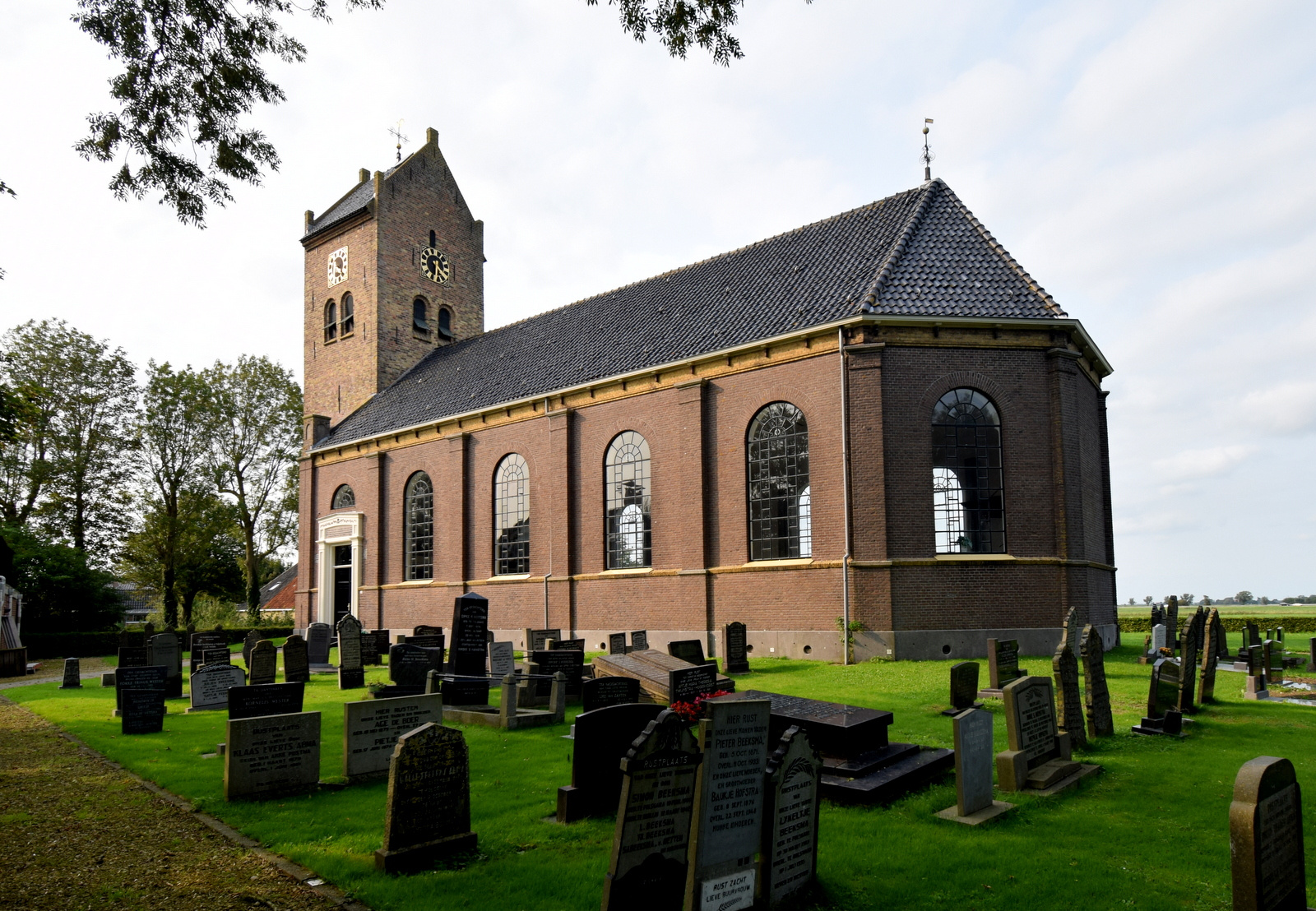
Church of Folsgare
