= Tern (disambiguation) =

A tern is a seabird in the family Laridae.

Tern or TERN may also refer to:

== Tern ==
- Alan Tern (born 1976), Singaporean actor
- Miller Tern, an American single-seat glider
- River Tern, a river in Shropshire, England
- Tern (company), a folding bicycle company in Taiwan
- Tern oilfield, Shetland basin in Scotland
- USS Tern, more than one United States Navy ship
- SY Tern, a historic passenger vessel in England
- Tern (typeface), a typeface used on road signs in Austria and Slovakia
- Tasanapol "Tern" Inthraphuvasak, a Thai racing driver, who is occasionally referred to as Tern

== TERN ==
- TERN, Terrestrial Ecosystem Research Network
- Trans-European road network
- Tactically Exploited Reconnaissance Node, a DARPA project

== See also ==
- Term (disambiguation)
- Turn (disambiguation)
