= Nijland =

Nijland Nijlân
- Village
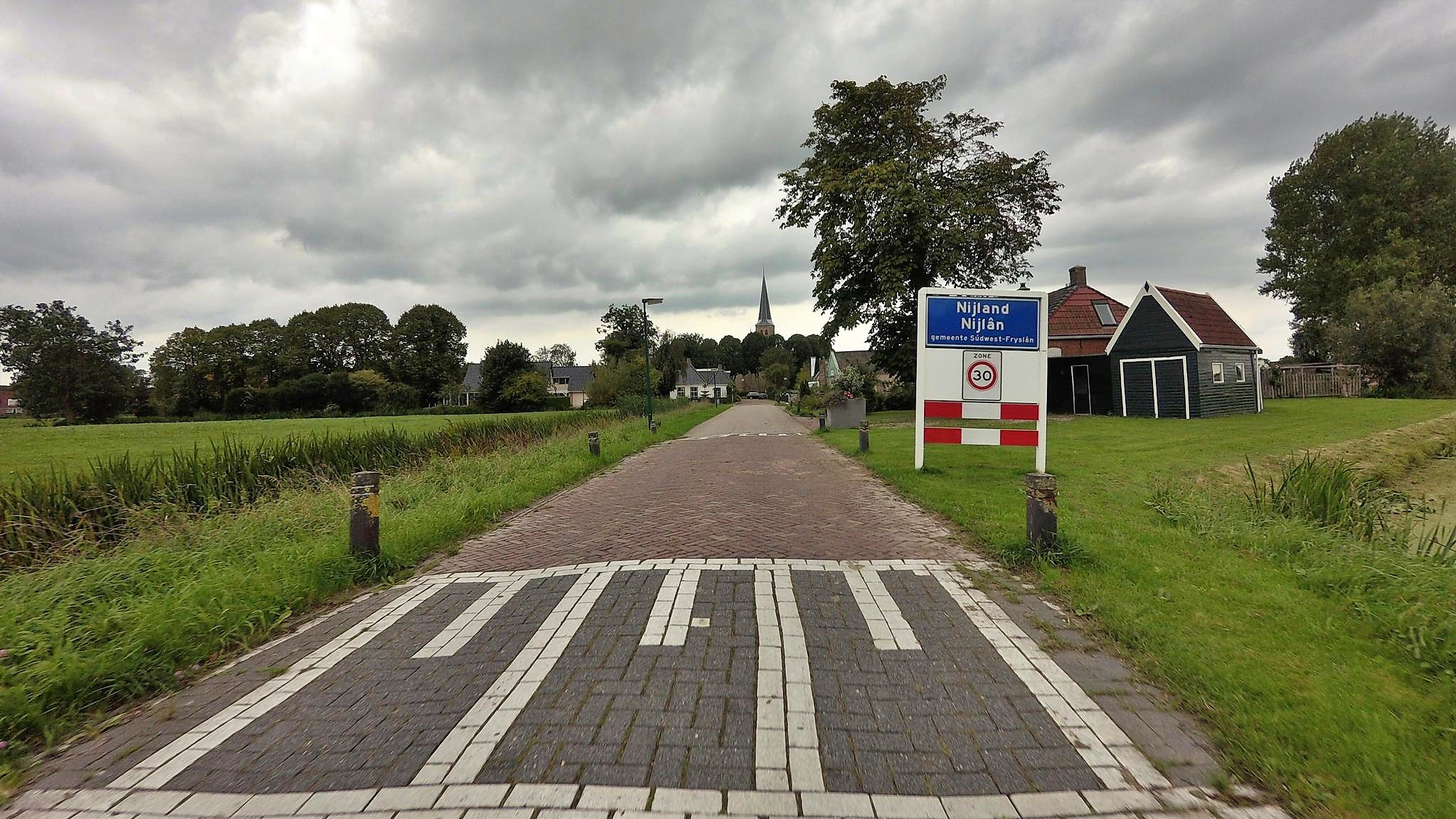
- Nijland east

- Flag Coat of arms

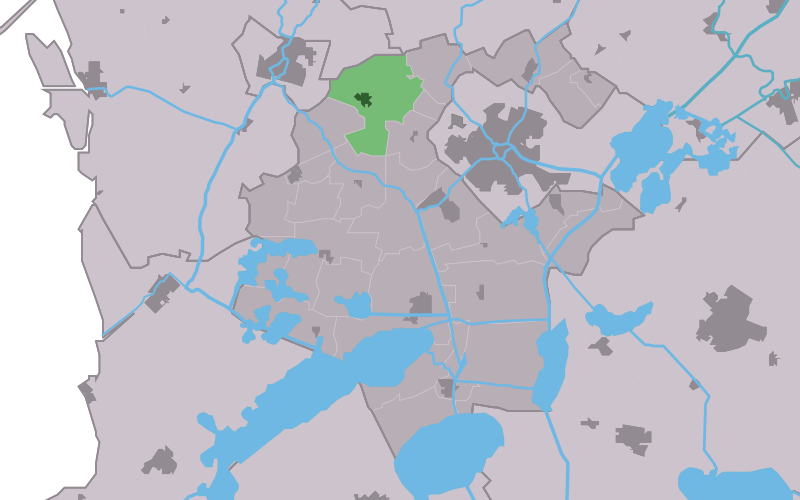
- Location in the former Wymbritseradiel municipality

- Location in the Netherlands Nijland (Netherlands)
- Country: Netherlands
- Province: Friesland
- Municipality: Súdwest-Fryslân

Area
  - Total: 9.84 km^{2} (3.80 sq mi)
- Elevation: 0.0 m (0 ft)

Population (2021)
  - Total: 1,005
  - Density: 102/km^{2} (265/sq mi)
- Time zone: UTC+1 (CET)
  - Summer (DST): UTC+2 (CEST)
- Postal code: 8771
- Dialing code: 0515

Nijland (West Frisian: Nijlân) is a village in Súdwest-Fryslân municipality in the province of Friesland, the Netherlands. It had a population of around 1,000 in January 2017.

The coat of arms depicts a pair of oxen linked by a chain, because according to legend a pair of oxen determined the location of the church, and so the village.

== History ==
The village was first mentioned in 1230 as "de Nova Terra", and means "new land" which is a reference to the poldering of the southern part of the Middelzee which had silted probably before 1100. The village was sometimes referred to as Dodakerke which means "church founded by Dodo" which is probably the abbot who also founded Nijeklooster. Nijland has a concentric structure with the farms placed around the church in a circle. During the 17th and 18th century, a linear extension was added to the south of the village.

The tower of the Dutch Reformed church dates from the late-13th century and was enlarged in the 17th century. The church dates from the 16th century and has been constructed using material of its 13th-century predecessor. The pulpit dates from 1659 and contains the mark S.P.Q.N. (Senatus Populus Que Novae Terrae).

Nijland was home to 464 people in 1840. During the 19th century, Nijland started to develop along the Sneek-Bolsward road. Before 2011, the village was part of the Wymbritseradiel municipality.

== Gallery ==
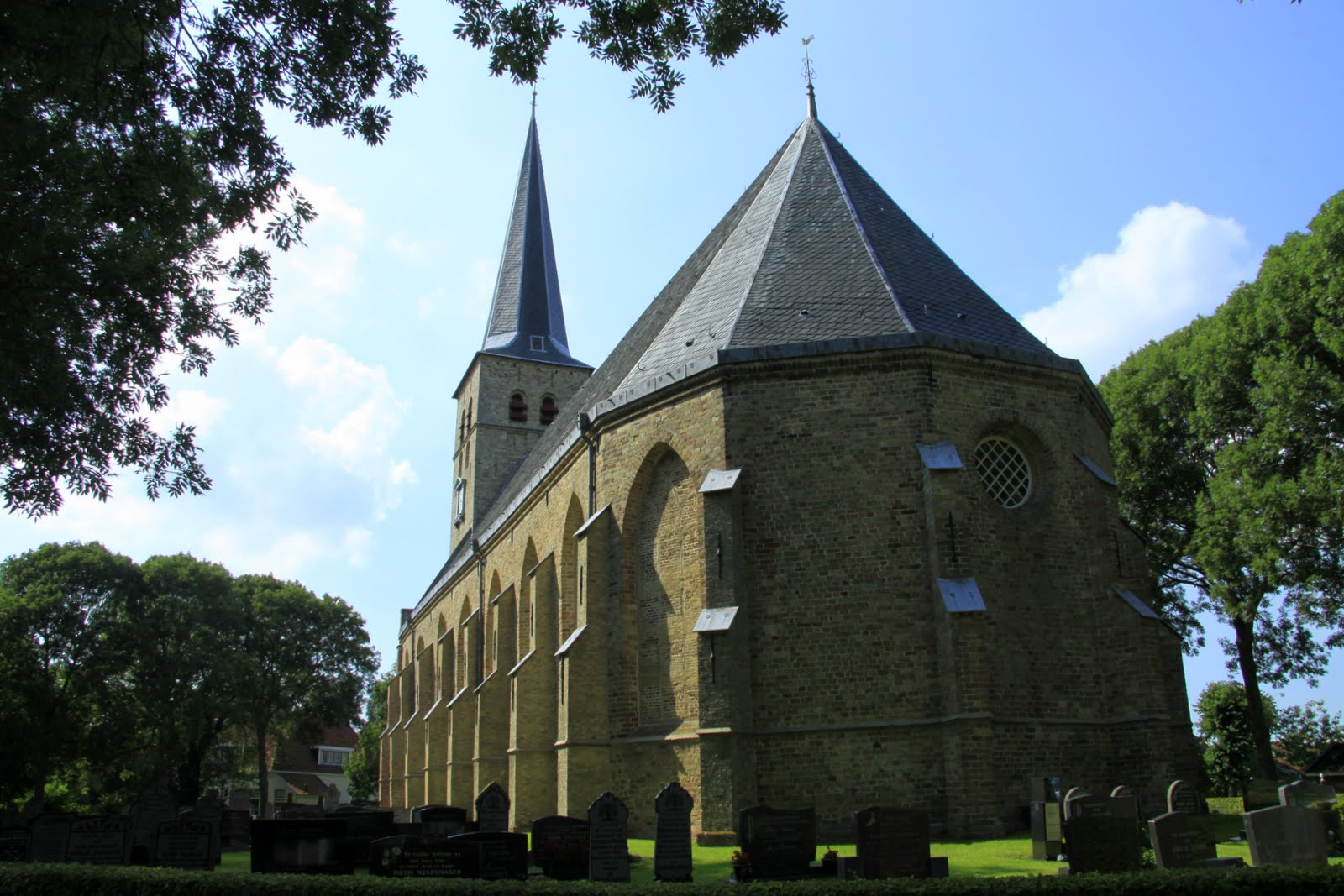
St Nicholas Church

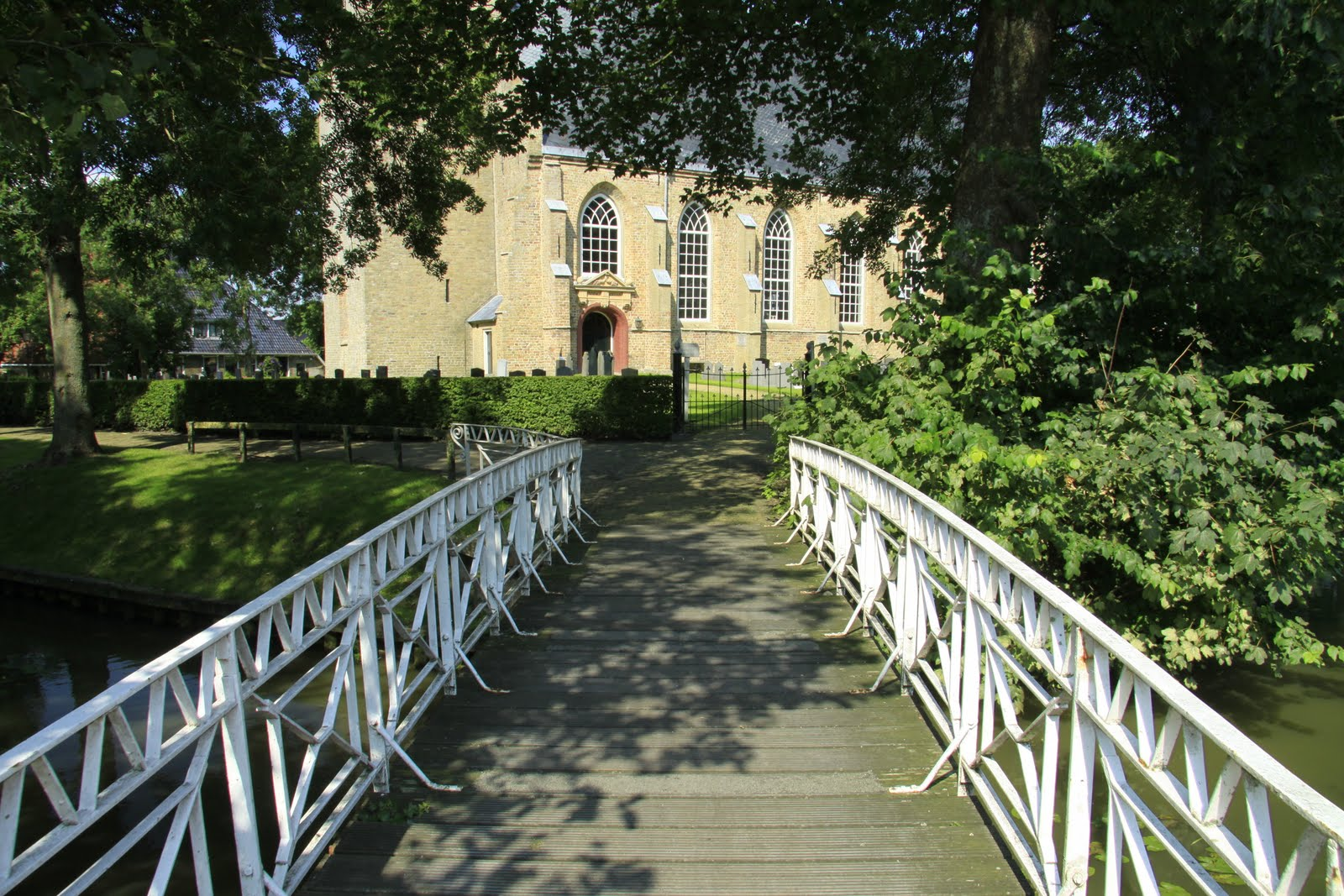
Bridge and church

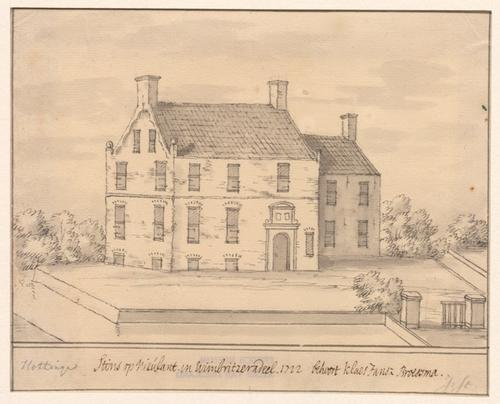
Drawing of Hottinga Stins (1722)

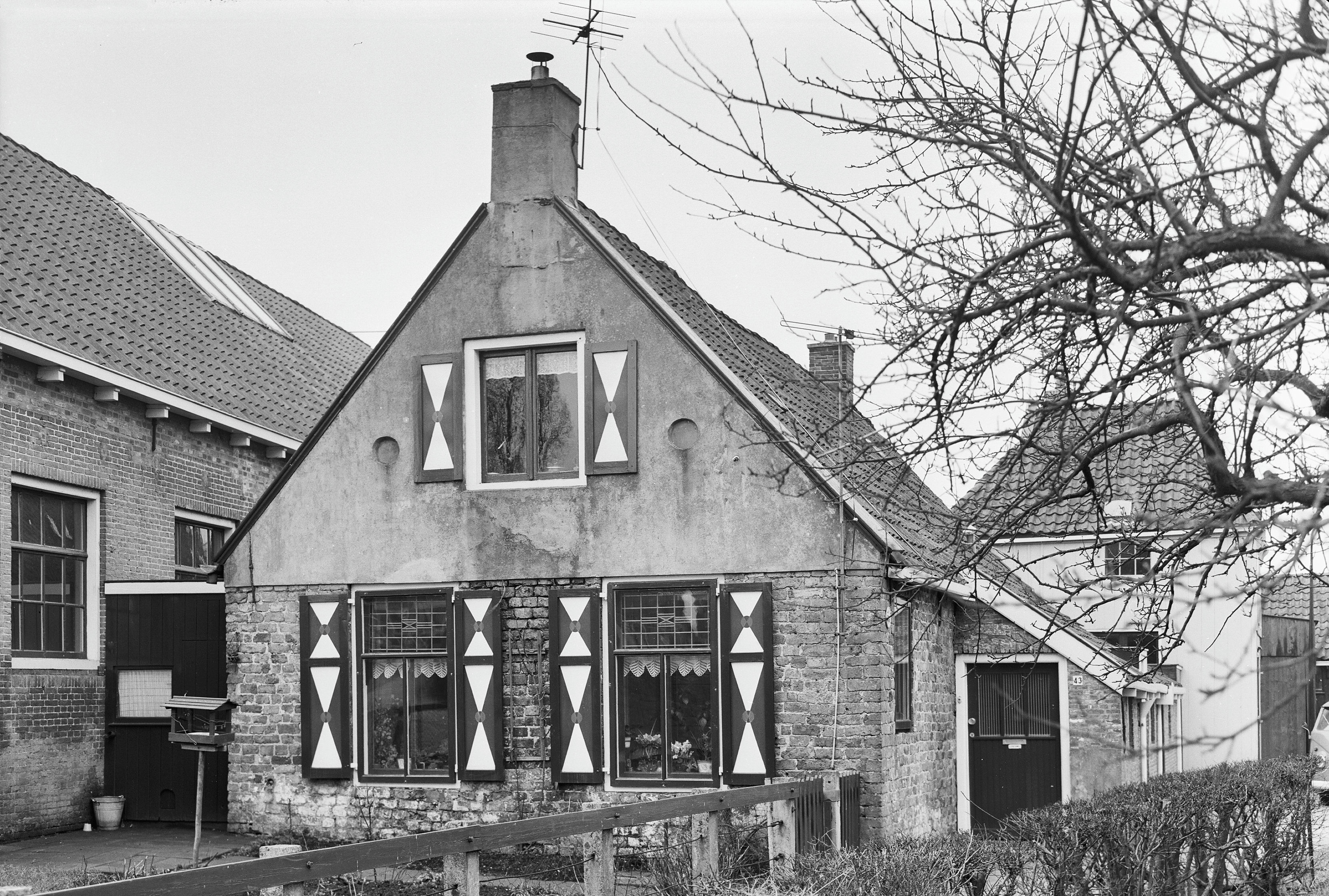
House in Nijland (1969)
