= Blauwhuis =

Blauwhuis Blauhús
- Village
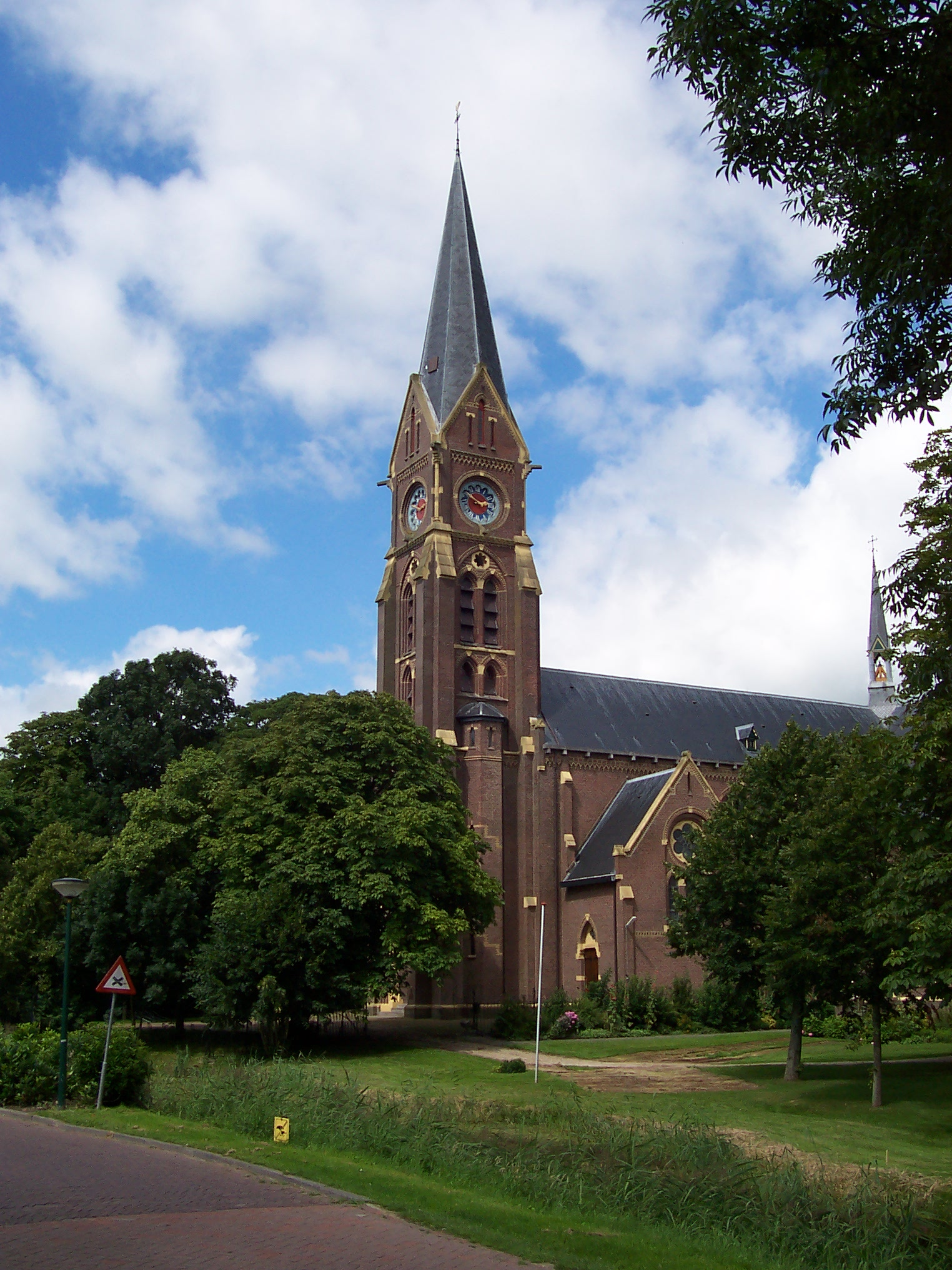
- St Vitus' Church

- Flag Coat of arms

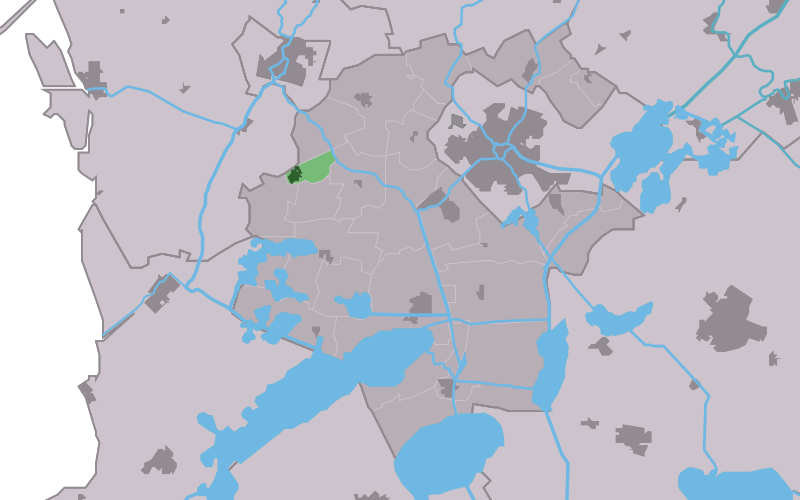
- Location in the former Wymbritseradiel municipality

- Location in the Netherlands Blauwhuis (Netherlands)
- Country: Netherlands
- Province: Friesland
- Municipality: Súdwest-Fryslân

Area
  - Total: 1.73 km^{2} (0.67 sq mi)
- Elevation: −0.1 m (−0.33 ft)

Population (2021)
  - Total: 605
  - Density: 350/km^{2} (906/sq mi)
- Time zone: UTC+1 (CET)
  - Summer (DST): UTC+2 (CEST)
- Postal code: 8615
- Dialing code: 0515

Blauwhuis (West Frisian: Blauhús) is a village in Súdwest-Fryslân municipality in the province of Friesland, the Netherlands. It had a population of around 585 in January 2017.

== History ==
The village was first mentioned in 1718 as 't Blauw Huys, and means "blue houses" after the tiles of the polder office who had been responsible for the 1622 poldering of the lake Sensmeer. In 1651, a priest was in charge of the polder house and started to invite other Catholics to the area, and developed into a Catholic enclave during the 18th century.

Blauwhuis was home to 151 people in 1840. The Catholic St Vitus Church was built between 1868 and 1871 and was designed by Pierre Cuypers. The church replaced a clandestine church in a barn. In 1950, it was awarded village status. Before 2011, the village was part of the Wymbritseradiel municipality.

== Gallery ==
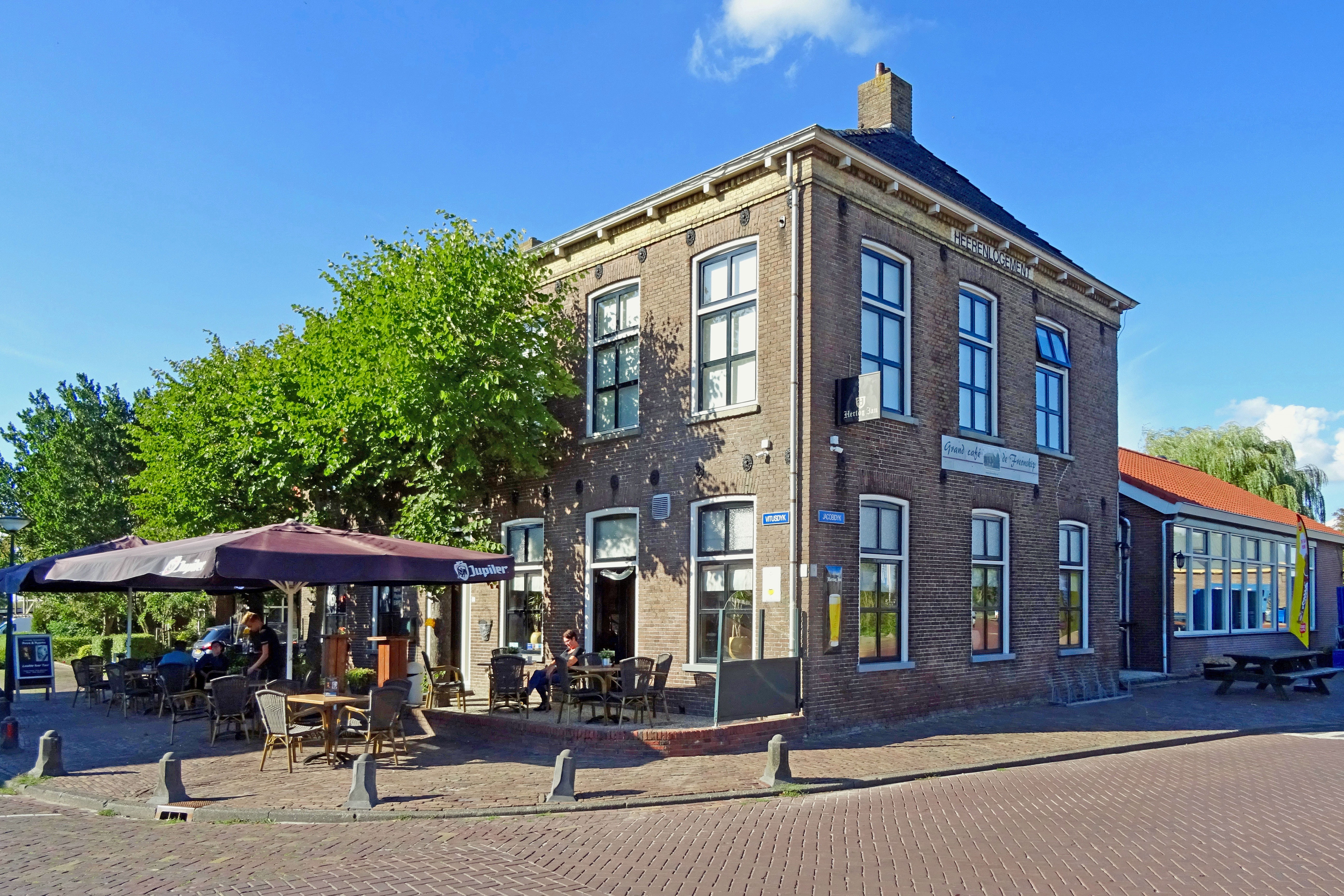
Pub in Blauwhuis

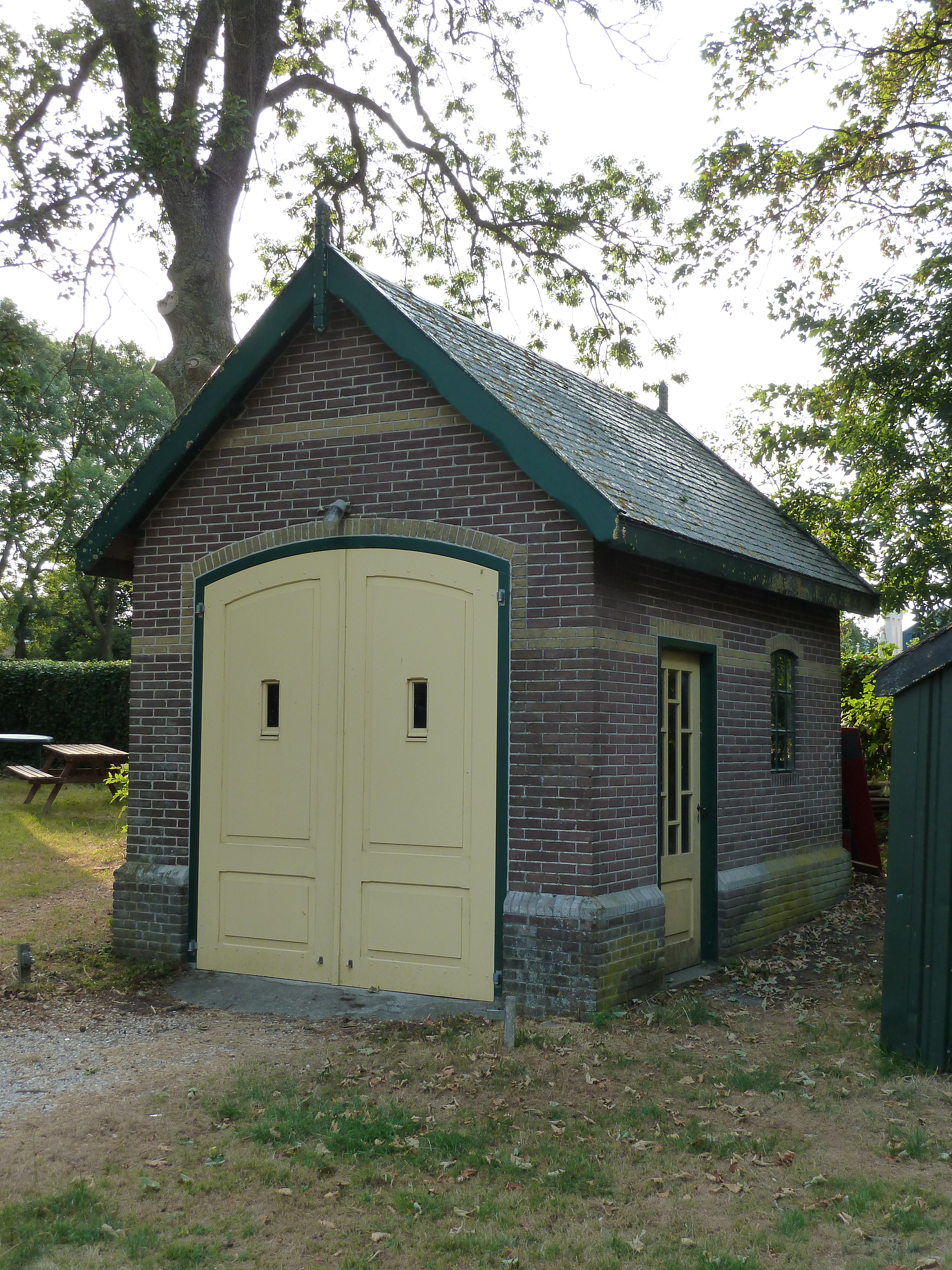
Carriage house

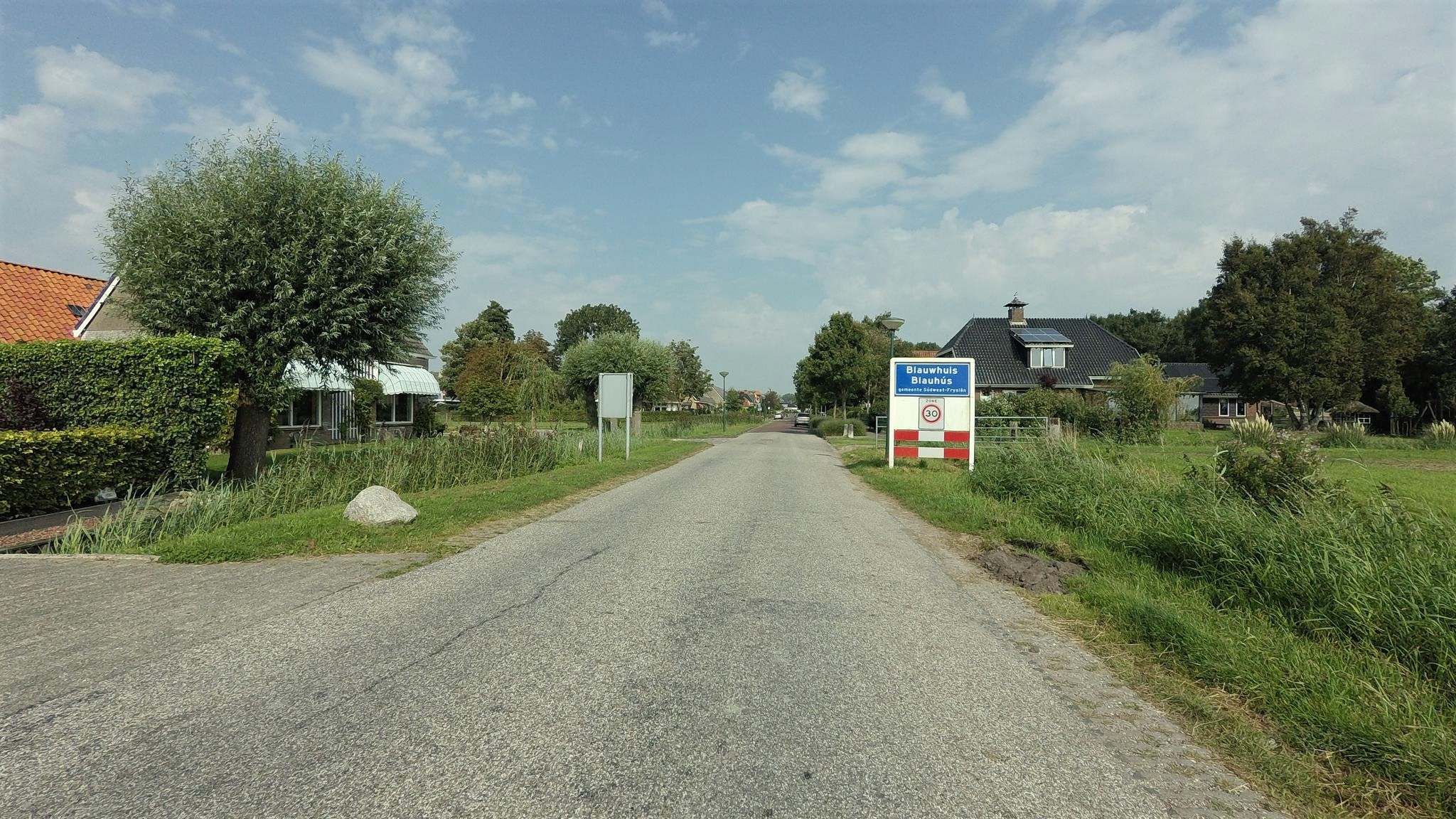
Welcome to Blauwhuis

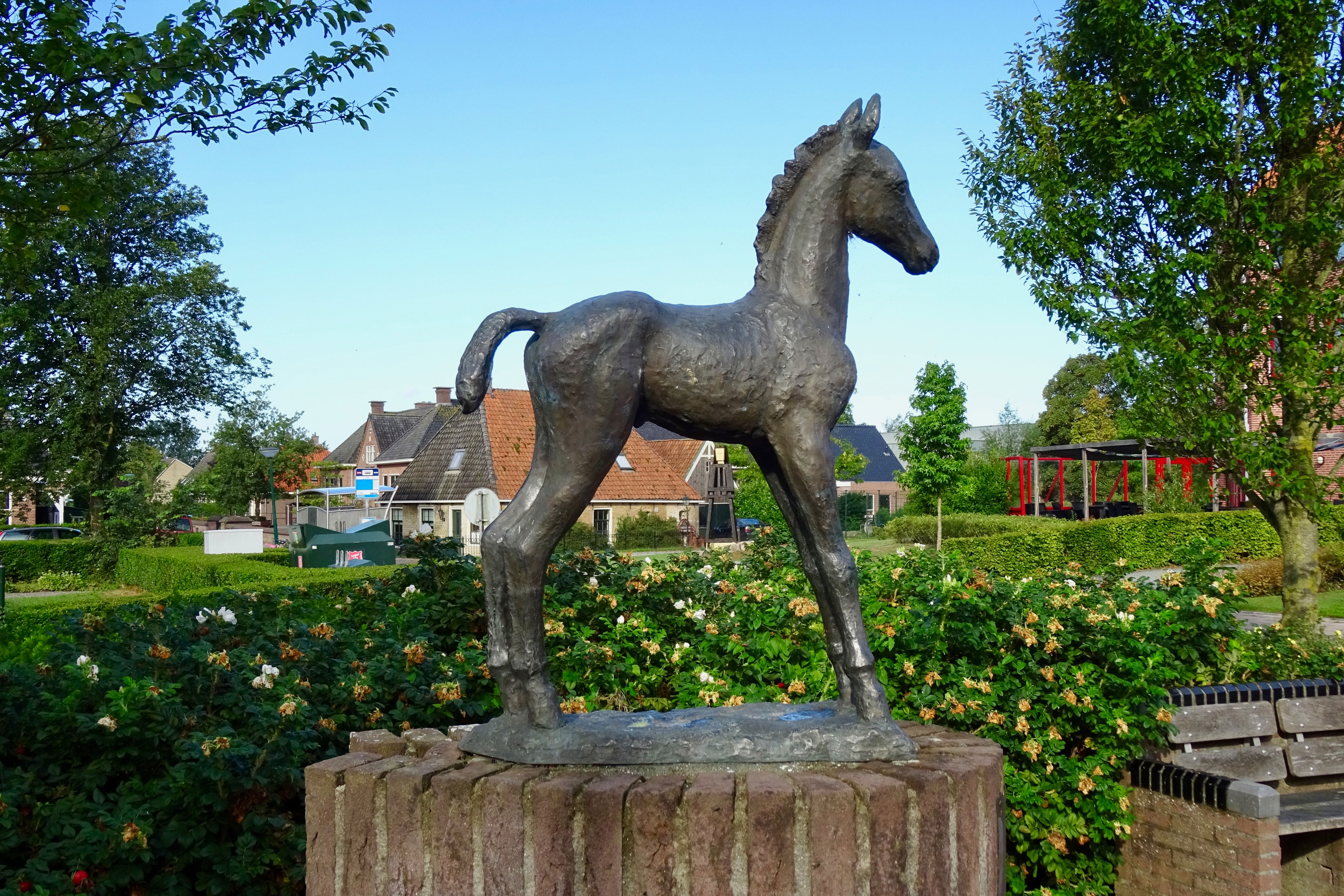
Horse statue by Maria van Everdingen
