= Tirns =

Tirns Turns
- Village
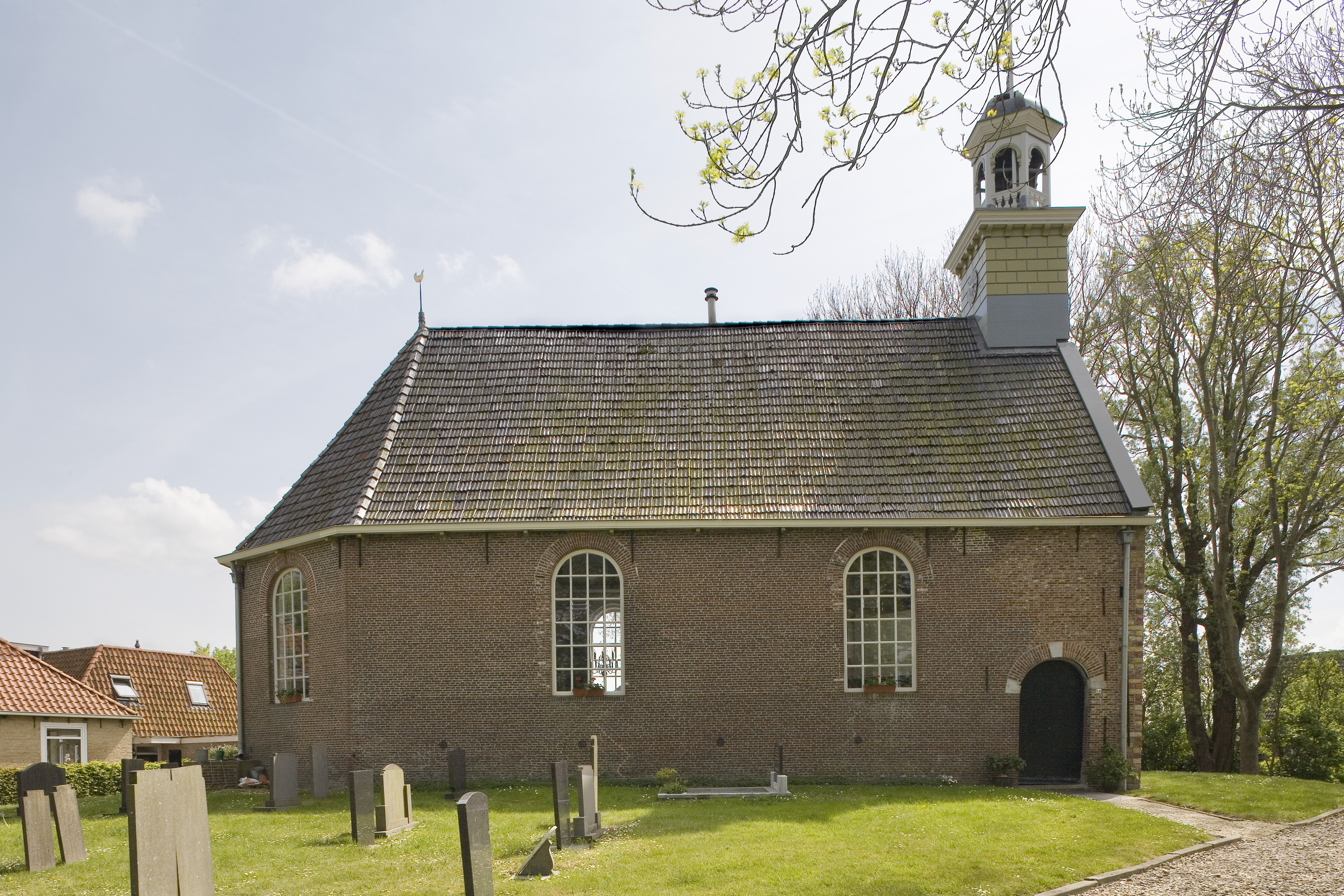
- Tirns Church

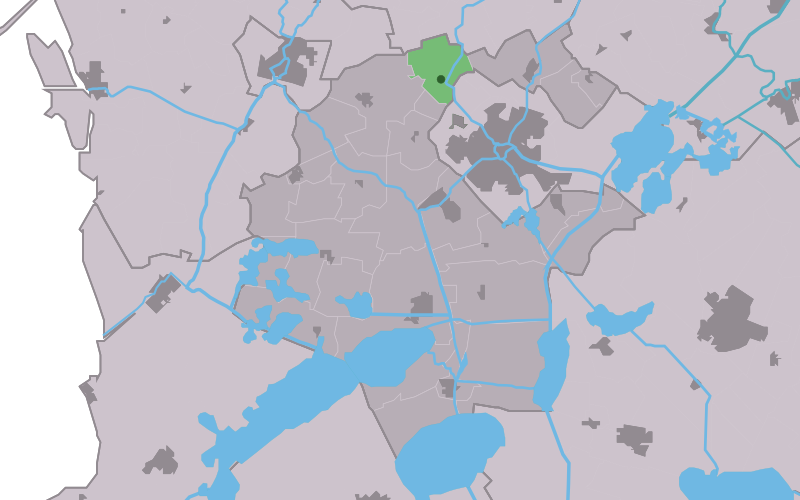
- Location in the former Wymbritseradiel municipality

- Location in the Netherlands Tirns (Netherlands)
- Country: Netherlands
- Province: Friesland
- Municipality: Súdwest-Fryslân

Area
  - Total: 4.78 km^{2} (1.85 sq mi)
- Elevation: 0.3 m (0.98 ft)

Population (2021)
  - Total: 185
  - Density: 38.7/km^{2} (100/sq mi)
- Time zone: UTC+1 (CET)
  - Summer (DST): UTC+2 (CEST)
- Postal code: 8632
- Dialing code: 0515

Tirns (West Frisian: Turns) is a village in Súdwest-Fryslân in the province of Friesland, the Netherlands. It had a population of around 170 in January 2017.

== History ==
The village was first mentioned in the 13th century as Terdenghe, and means "settlement of the people of Teerd". Tirns is a little terp (artificial living hill) village near the former Middelzee. It was connected to Franeker via a canal.

The church was built in 1699 as a replacement of the medieval church. The cemetery was used both by the Protestant and Catholics. The monastery Thabor was located about one kilometre south of Tirns and was a priory of the Augustinians founded in 1406. The monks of the priory constructed several dikes in the area. The monastery was destroyed in 1572 by the Geuzen.

Tirns was home to 290 people in 1840. Before 2011, the village was part of the Wymbritseradiel municipality.

== Gallery ==
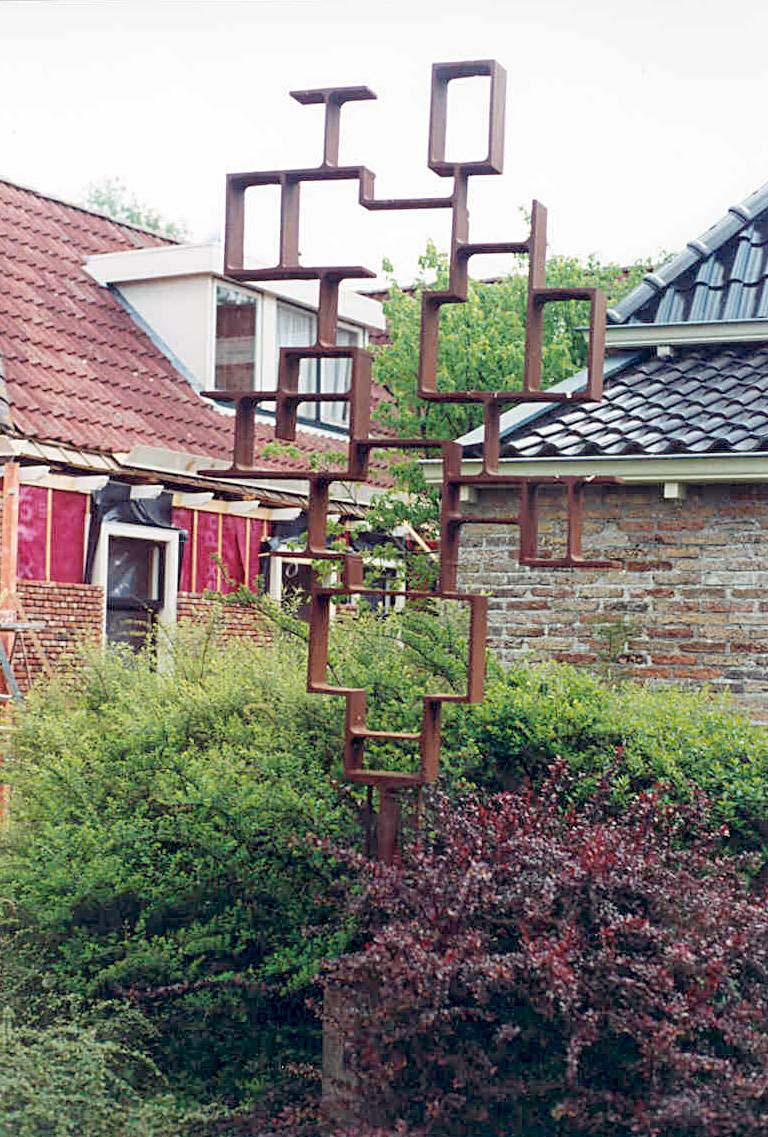
Art in Tirns
