= Gauw =

Gauw Gau
- Village
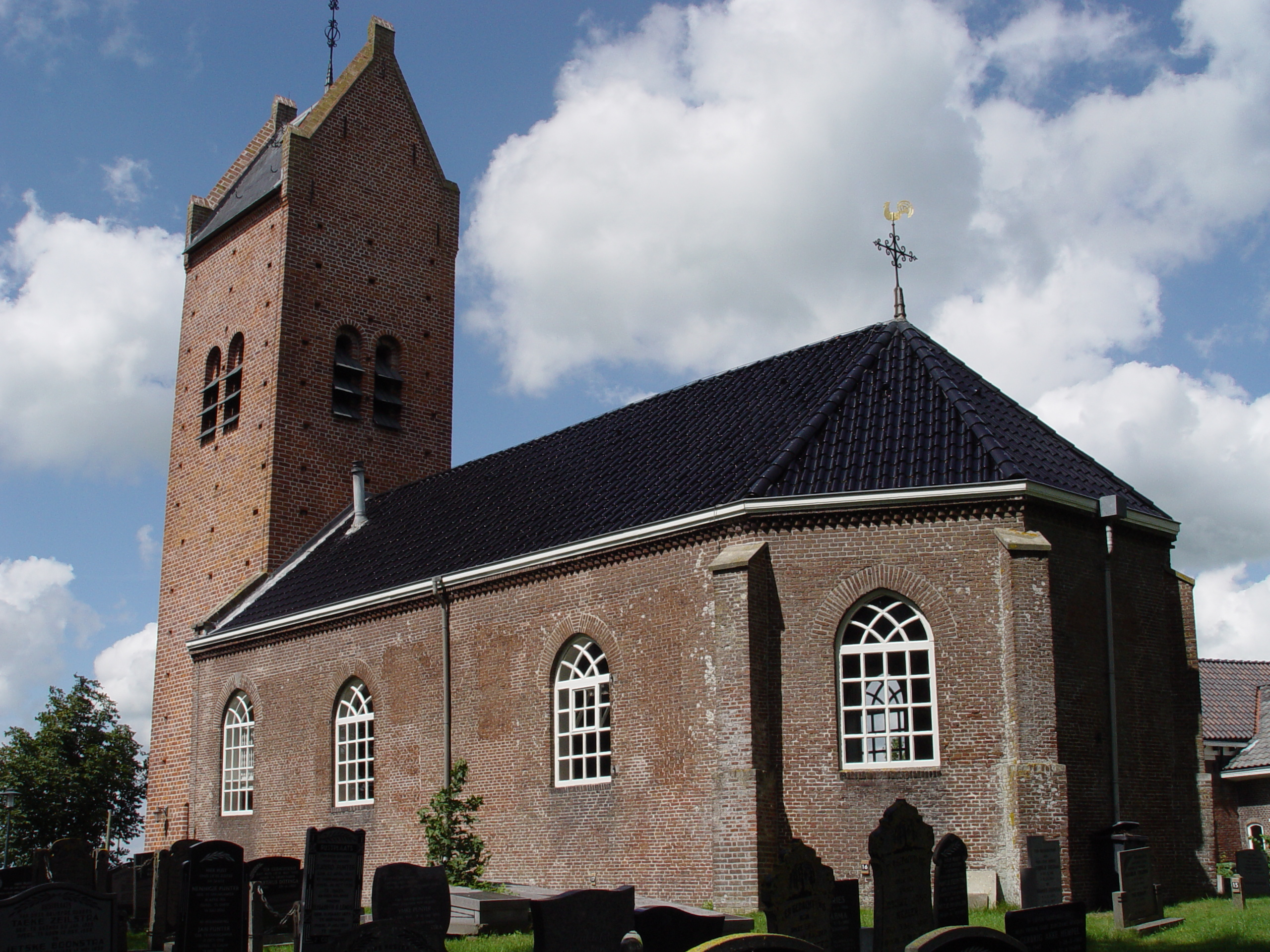
- Hervormde kerk (Gauw)

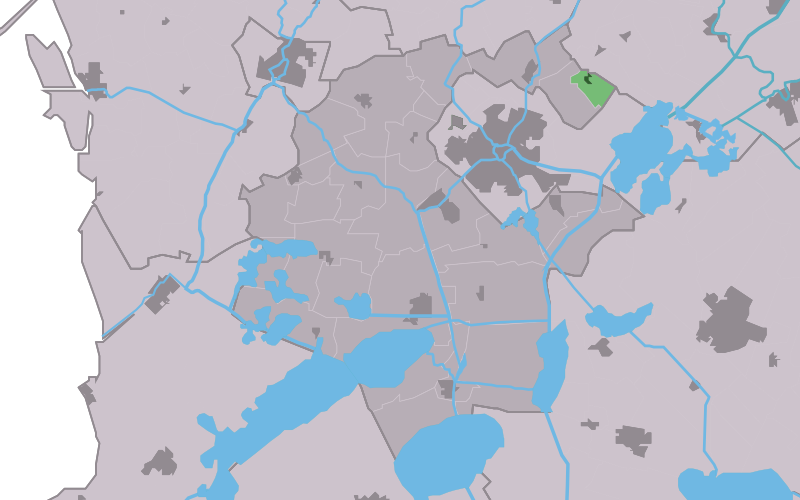
- Location in the former Wymbritseradiel municipality

- Location in the Netherlands Gauw (Netherlands)
- Coordinates: 53°3′28″N 5°42′47″E
- Country: Netherlands
- Province: Friesland
- Municipality: Súdwest-Fryslân

Area
  - Total: 1.61 km^{2} (0.62 sq mi)
- Elevation: −0.2 m (−0.66 ft)

Population (2021)
  - Total: 340
  - Density: 210/km^{2} (550/sq mi)
- Time zone: UTC+1 (CET)
  - Summer (DST): UTC+2 (CEST)
- Postal code: 8627
- Dialing code: 0515

Gauw (West Frisian: Gau) is a small village in Súdwest-Fryslân municipality in the province of Friesland, the Netherlands. It had a population of around 385 in January 2017.

== History ==
The village was first mentioned in 1482 as Ghawe, and was the name of a stream. Gauw is a terp village which was somewhat isolated. The medieval church was demolished in 1685 for a new church which in turn was replaced in the 19th century. The tower probably dates from the 13th century.

Gauw was home to 144 people in 1840. Before 2011, the village was part of the Wymbritseradiel municipality.
