= Term =

Term may refer to:

== Language ==
- Terminology, context-specific nouns or compound words
  - Technical term (or term of art), used by specialists in a field
    - Scientific terminology, used by scientists
- Term (argumentation), part of an argument in debate theory

== Law and finance ==
- Contractual term, a provision in a contract
  - Credit repayment terms
  - Payment terms, "net D" on a trade invoice
  - Purchase order, invoice terms more generally
- Term life insurance

== Lengths of time ==
- Academic term, part of a year at school or university
- Term of office, a set period a person serves in an elected office
- Term of patent, the period of enforcement of patent rights
- Term of a pregnancy
- Prison sentence

== Mathematics and physics ==
- Term (logic), a component of a logical or mathematical expression (not to be confused with term logic, or Aristotelian logic)
  - Ground term, a term with no variables
- Term (arithmetic), or addend, an operand to the addition operator
  - Term of a summation, a polynomial, or a series, a special case of a summand
- Term algebra, a freely generated algebraic structure
- Term logic, an approach to logic that began with Aristotle and that was dominant until the advent of modern predicate logic
- Term symbol, a concept in quantum mechanics

== Other uses ==
- Term (architecture) or terminal form, a human head and bust that continues as a square tapering pillar-like form
- Term (computers) or terminal emulator, a program that emulates a video terminal
- Term, Iran, a village in Mazandaran Province, Iran
- Telecom Enforcement Resource and Monitoring, an agency of the Indian Department of Telecommunications

== See also ==
- Maxterms and minterms, in Boolean algebra
- Terme (disambiguation)
- Termeh, a type of textile
- Tern (disambiguation)
