= Theunis Piersma =

Dutch ecologist, biologist, and educator (born 1958)

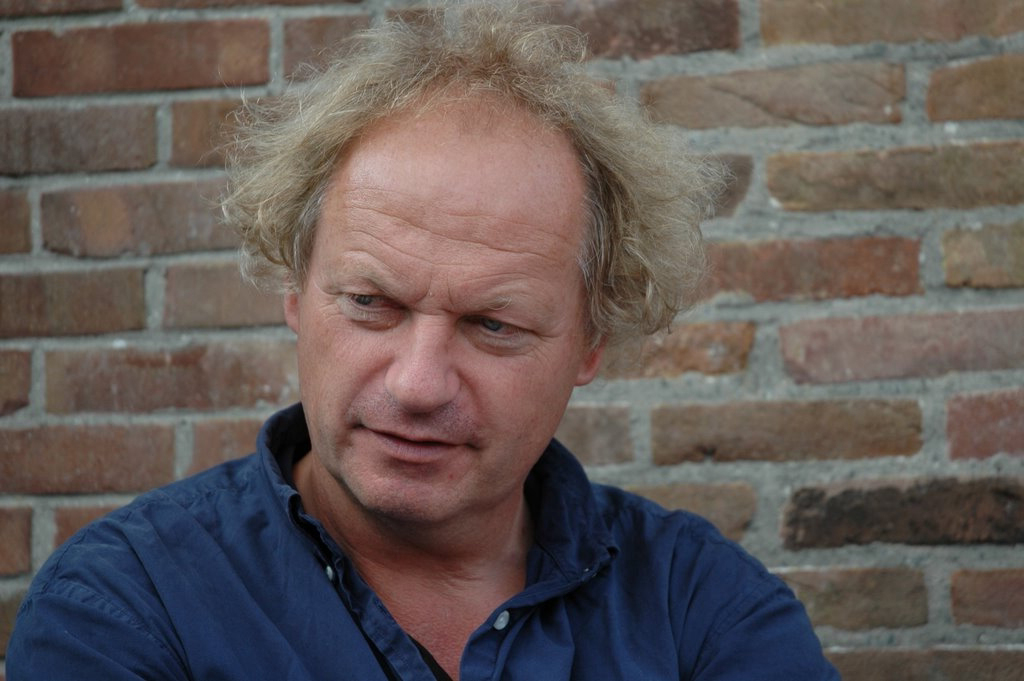
- Born: June 15, 1958 (age 68); Hemelum, Friesland, Netherlands
- Occupations: Ecologist, ornithologist, educator
- Known for: Migratory bird research

Academic background
- Education: University of Groningen (BSc, MSc, PhD)
- Doctoral advisor: Rudolf H. Drent

Academic work
- Discipline: Ecology, biology
- Sub-discipline: Migratory bird ecologist and specialist
- Institutions: University of Groningen, NIOZ

Theunis Piersma (born 15 June 1958) is a Dutch ornithologist, ecologist, and educator. He is among the most influential ornithologists, particularly in the wader bird area, in the world. He specifically looks at waders and correlations between flock size and distribution, climate, food, predators, pathogens, and their historical-genetic background. RTV Drenthe referred to him in 2012 as the "first migratory bird professor in the world."

He is currently a professor and chair of the Global Flyway Ecology department at the University of Groningen and Senior Research Leader at Royal Netherlands Institute of Sea Research (NIOZ). He is also a Wadden biologist at the Royal Netherlands Institute for Sea Research, where he works on sea conservation.

== Education ==
Piersma earned his BSc in biology and palaeontology in 1980; his biology MSc cum laude in 1984; and his PhD cum laude in biology in 1994, all from the University of Groningen. Piersma led his first research trip to Mauritania in 1980 as a student. His PhD advisor was animal ecologist Rudolf H. Drent. Following graduation, he moved to the NIOZ as a postdoc.

== Career ==
=== Research ===
Among his many contributions to the scientific community are proof that a bird's maximum non-stop flight distance was more than double what it was originally known to be; examination of the phenotype and its relation to evolution; and the discovery that "migratory birds can change the structure of their bodies radically in order to adapt to the diverse conditions they encounter on their journeys." His research on the ecology of the Yellow Sea was a major influence in China refining environmental policy and increasing conservation efforts. Nature organizations in the Netherlands ended all mechanical cockle fishing in the Wadden Sea after his work at NIOZ proved it harmful. This was a particular achievement, as he has criticized the Netherlands for not working harder on conservation efforts.

As of 2020, Piersma has published more than 500 peer-reviewed articles and 14 books. Among his many funding sources, he received 2 NWO grants to research tools used for bird tracking in 2011, and 2 from National Geographic in 2014.

He is heavily involved in Wader's Study Groups and served as vice-chair of the International Wader Study Group for 15 years. He has also been the editor-in-chief of Ardea, a peer-reviewed ornithological journal, and helped found the Global Flyway Network to track birds nationwide. At University of Groningen, he was the animal ecology chair for 9 years before moving to the global flyway ecology department and serving as its chair. He appeared as the subject of De wereld is plat (The World is Flat), a 2007 Dutch documentary about his conservation work.

=== Work in Friesland ===
Piersma helped found start the Station Fryslân 2018, a citizens' ecological organization dedicated to looking after Friesland's environment. In 2012, the initiative established ‘Kening fan ’e Greide’ (King of the Meadow, a reference to the godwit), which enabled farmers, scientists, and artists to collaborate in an effort to "promote sustainable attitudes to nature and the landscape."

=== Outreach ===
Piersma is known for his creative teaching style, which he tries to make accessible to everyone. In 2012, he opened the WWF's Dutch Jubilee Conference with a theatre performance illustrating the migration of the black-tailed godwit, with composer Sytze Pruiksma providing accompanying music. He has two main performances: The Sound and Science of Bird Migration and Music of Migration, which he has performed in front of Queen Beatrix of the Netherlands, at the Oerol Festival, and to the Bohai Bay community while he was there studying the Yellow Sea.

== Personal life ==
Piersma was born in Hemelum in 1958; his native language is Frisian. He currently lives in Gaast.

== Awards and honours ==
In 2001, a red knot subspecies from the New Siberian Islands was named Calidris canutus piersmai in his honour.

Year	Prize	Awarding institution	Notes	Ref.
1989	Herman Klomp Prize	Netherlands Ornithologists' Union, SOVON-Bird Monitoring Netherlands, Vogelbescherming-BirdLife Netherlands	1.5 k€ award	
1994	Dutch National Zoology Prize	Netherlands Zoological Society	3 k€ award	
1996	PIONIER Award	NWO	0.9 M€ award	
1998	Corresponding Fellow	American Ornithologists’ Union	Elected	
2000	Research Award	National Geographic Society	50 kUSD	
2001	Membership	Fryske Akademy	Elected	
2004	Prize for Nature Conservation	Prince Bernhard Cultural Foundation	50 k€	
2004	Ornithologenpreis	German Ornithologists' Society	5k€	
2004	Luc Hoffmann Medal for Excellence in Science and Conservation	Wetlands International		
2009	Membership	Royal Netherlands Academy of Arts and Sciences	Elected	
2011	Recipient	TOP-subsidie	NWO, NWO Council for Earth and Life Sciences	
2014	Spinoza Prize	NWO	2.5M€ award	
2016	Membership	Royal Holland Society of Sciences and Humanities		
2017	Order of the Netherlands Lion knightship	Kingdom of the Netherlands		
2017	The Marsh Award for International Ornithology	Marsh Christian Trust and British Trust for Ornithology		
2017	Anita Andriesen Prijs	Anita Andriesen Prijs		
2020	Godman-Salvin Medal	British Ornithologists' Union	Organization's most prestigious award	
2020	Stairway to Impact Award	NWO	Inaugural awards; €50,000 prize	

== Books ==
Year	Title	Title language	Title in English	Subject	Notes	Ref.
1982		English	Wintering waders on the Banc d'Arguin, Mauritania: Report of the Netherlands Ornithological Mauritanian Expedition 1980	Ornithology	Written with Wibe Altenburg, Meinte Engelmoer, and Ron Mes	
1992		English	The Migration of Knots	Ornithology	With Nick Davidson	
1994		English	Close to the edge: Energetic bottlenecks and the evolution of migratory pathways in knots	Ornithology, biology		
1999	Ecologische Atlas van de Nederlandse Wadvogels	Dutch		Ecology	Written with Bruno J. Ens and Leo Zwarts; photographs by Jan van de Kam	
2000	De onvrije natuur: Verkenningen van natuurlijke grenzen	Dutch		Ecology	Edited with J.M. Tinbergen, J.P. Bakker, and J.M. van den Broek	
2000	Op de vleugels van de wind: Wadvogelverhalen	Dutch		Ornithology	Photographs by Jan van de Kam	
2001	Goudplevieren en wilsterflappers: Eeuwenoude fascinatie voor trekvogels	Dutch		Ornithology	Written with Joop Jukema, Jan Hulscher, Erik J. Bunskoeke, Anita Koolhaas, and A. Veenstra	
2003		English	Life along land's edge: Wildlife on the shores of Roebuck Bay, Broome	Animal ecology	Written with Danny I. Rogers, Marc S.S. Lavaleye, Grant Pearson, and Petra de Goeji; photographs by Jan van de Kam	
2004		English	Shorebirds: An illustrated behavioural ecology	Behavioral ecology	Written with Bruno Ens and Leo Zwarts; photographs by Jan van de Kam	
2005		English	Seeking Nature's Limits: Ecologists in the field	Ecology	Edited with Joost Tinbergen and Jan Bakker; translated by R.H. Drent	
2006	Waarom nonnetjes samen klaarkomen en andere wonderen van het Wad	Dutch		Ecology		
2008		English	Invisible Connections: Why Migrating Shorebirds Need the Yellow Sea	Ornithology	Edited with Jan Lewis; photographs by Jan van de Kam	
2011		English	The Flexible Phenotype: A Body-Centred Integration of Ecology, Physiology, and Behaviour	Biology	Photographs by Jan A. van Gils	
2014	Sweltsjes fan Gaast	Frisian	Guests of Summer: A House Martin love story			
2016	Knooppunt Waddenzee	Dutch	Intersection Wadden Sea	Ecology	Rob Buiter, Laura Govers, Metawad team	
2016	Reisvogels	Dutch	Marathon Migrants	Ornithology, migration	Photographs by Jan van de Kam	
2018	Een horizon vol weidevogels in Zuidwest-Friesland: Inzichten uit de workshop van de International Wader Study Group, 28 september 2018	Dutch	Meadowbirds on the horizon of southwest Friesland: Insights of the International Wader Study Group workshop, 28 September 2018	Animal ecology, ornithology	With Ruth Howison, Heinrich Belting, Jennifer Smart, Mark Smart, Rob Shuckard, Ole Thorup, and International Wader Study Group	
2018	De ontsnapping van de natuur: Een nieuwe kijk op kennis	Dutch	The Escape of Nature: A new perspective on knowledge		Written with Thomas Oudman	
