= Kabir Kaul =

British conservationist

Kabir Kaul FRSA FLS
- Born: 2005 (age 20–21); City of Westminster, London
- Occupations: Conservationist, writer and campaigner
- Awards: Prime Minister's Points of Light award

Kabir Kaul (born 2005) is a British conservationist, writer and urban wildlife campaigner.

== Biography ==
In February 2019, he published an interactive map on his blog, Nature Reserves of London - 2nd Edition, showing more than 1000 publicly-accessible nature reserves and Sites of Importance for Nature Conservation in Greater London.

In celebration of the Platinum Jubilee of Elizabeth II, he led the '70 Nestboxes for 70 Years' campaign, aiming to donate nest boxes to schools in London in early 2022. A total of 106 boxes were donated to schools. The Department for Culture, Media and Sport subsequently invited him to a Jubilee lunch at 10 Downing Street, where the 107th nest box was placed in the 10 Downing Street Garden. During the Jubilee he was also Young Ambassador for The Queen's Green Canopy. In this role he helped launch an urban greening project in Tower Hamlets and contributed to The Queen’s Green Canopy Book: Ancient Woodlands and Trees by Adrian Houston and Charles Sainsbury-Plaice.

Kaul has held roles in several charities and organisations, including the Royal Society for the Protection of Birds and London National Park City. Mayor of London Sadiq Khan appointed him a member of the London Rewilding Taskforce in 2022, a role in which he served until March 2023.

He has made appearances on a number of national television programmes, including BBC Springwatch and BBC Autumnwatch. He has written for The Big Issue and has been featured in or contributed to The Guardian, The Observer, The Financial Times and BBC Radio 4. In 2023 he spoke at the 'Restore Nature Now' protest outside DEFRA's main headquarters, organised by naturalist Chris Packham in response to that year's State of nature report.

Kaul advocates for the protection and restoration of nature in urban areas, particularly in London where he lives. Notably he has campaigned for Warren Farm, Southall to receive Local nature reserve status.

He co-authored London in the Wild: Exploring Nature in the City in 2022.

== Recognition ==
- In recognition of his Nature Reserves of London map, Kaul received the Marsh Award for Young Ornithologist 2019 and was named a Big Issue Top 100 Changemaker of 2020.
- Prime Minister Boris Johnson recognised him with a Points of Light award in 2020, celebrating his advocacy of nature conservation in London and nature blog Kaul of the Wild.
- The International Fund for Animal Welfare awarded him its first ever Youth Conservation Award, presented by Baroness Gale in 2021.
- Kaul was appointed a Fellow of the Royal Society of Arts (FRSA) in 2023.
- In May 2024, he was the recipient of the Linnean Society's John Spedan Lewis Emerging Leader award, awarded to "an individual who is making a significant and innovative contribution to conservation". He was subsequently elected a Fellow (FLS) in July that year.

== Personal life ==
Kaul attended Watford Grammar School for Boys and lives in North West London. His family is of Kashmiri origin.
