= Juliet Vickery =

British ecologist

Professor Juliet Vickery
- Born: Plymouth
- Education: University of Oxford (BSc & DPhil)
- Known for: President of the British Ornithologists' Union; CEO of the British Trust for Ornithology
- Awards: British Ornithologists' Union Ibis Award, 2006; Marsh Award for Ornithology, 2018; British Ecological Society Award, 2020
- Scientific career
- Fields: Ornithology and Conservation Biology
- Workplaces: University of Edinburgh, Royal Society for the Protection of Birds, British Trust for Ornithology
- Thesis: The effects of surface water acidification on riparian birds, with particular reference to the Dipper (1988)
- Doctoral advisor: Sir Richard Southwood

Juliet Anne Vickery is a British ecologist and CEO at the British Trust for Ornithology. Her research focusses on understanding the drivers of declines in farmland and migrant birds. She was president of the British Ornithologists' Union between 2019 and 2023.

== Education and career ==
Vickery undertook her undergraduate degree and D.Phil. at the University of Oxford, graduating in 1989. After a D.Phil. on the impacts of acid rain on white-throated dippers, she undertook postdoctoral research at the University of East Anglia working with Prof William Sutherland on brent geese.

After a brief spell working for Scottish Natural Heritage, Vickery moved to the University of Edinburgh to take up a lecturer position where she found securing funding for applied research difficult. The challenge of undertaking applied conservation research in an academic setting led to Vickery's move from Edinburgh to become the head of the terrestrial ecology unit at the British Trust for Ornithology.

After 10 years with the BTO, Vickery moved to the Royal Society for the Protection of Birds as Head of International Conservation Science. Her work at RSPB involved leading scientific teams focused on the conservation of globally threatened species and habitats, particularly in West Africa and the UK's Overseas Territories. Her research on declines in migrant birds has had widespread policy impact. Following 11 years at the RSPB she returned to the British Trust for Ornithology in 2020 as chief executive officer.

Alongside her full-time work, Vickery has held a number of additional roles. With the British Ornithologists' Union she was Chair of the Equality and Diversity Committee, vice-president and then elected President (2019–2023). She served on the Darwin Initiative Expert Committee for six years and chaired the Policy Committee of the British Ecological Society for nine years.

Vickery is an Honorary Research Fellow at the University of Cambridge and an honorary professor at the University of East Anglia.

== Research ==
Vickery's research has centered on diagnosing causes of species decline and developing practical solutions to reverse these trends. She has a strong interest in the impact of land-use change on bird populations, particularly in agricultural landscapes, where increased intensification of farming has led to widespread declines. Her work has uncovered the complexity of the drivers of farmland birds, and has established that increasing heterogeneity across the landscape is most likely to reverse these declines. Her work also addresses the decline of Afro-Palearctic migrant birds and explores the connections between human livelihoods and conservation in tropical forest regions. She established the scope of the declines and recent papers have helped identify that land use change in Africa may be the key drivers.

== Honours and awards ==
Vickery was awarded the Marsh Award for Ornithology in 2018 by the Marsh Christian Trust and the British Trust for Ornithology, recognising her contributions to the field.

She was awarded the British Ornithologists' Union Ibis Award in 2006 for her work on farmland birds, and won the British Ecological Society Award in 2020 for her contributions to the Society.

== Personal life ==
Outside of her professional commitments, Vickery engages in swimming, cycling, running, and birdwatching in the fenlands of Cambridgeshire. As an amateur triathlete she represented Great Britain in her age class on 11 occasions, winning two international events as a veteran.
