= Thomas Fattorini Ltd =

British jewellers

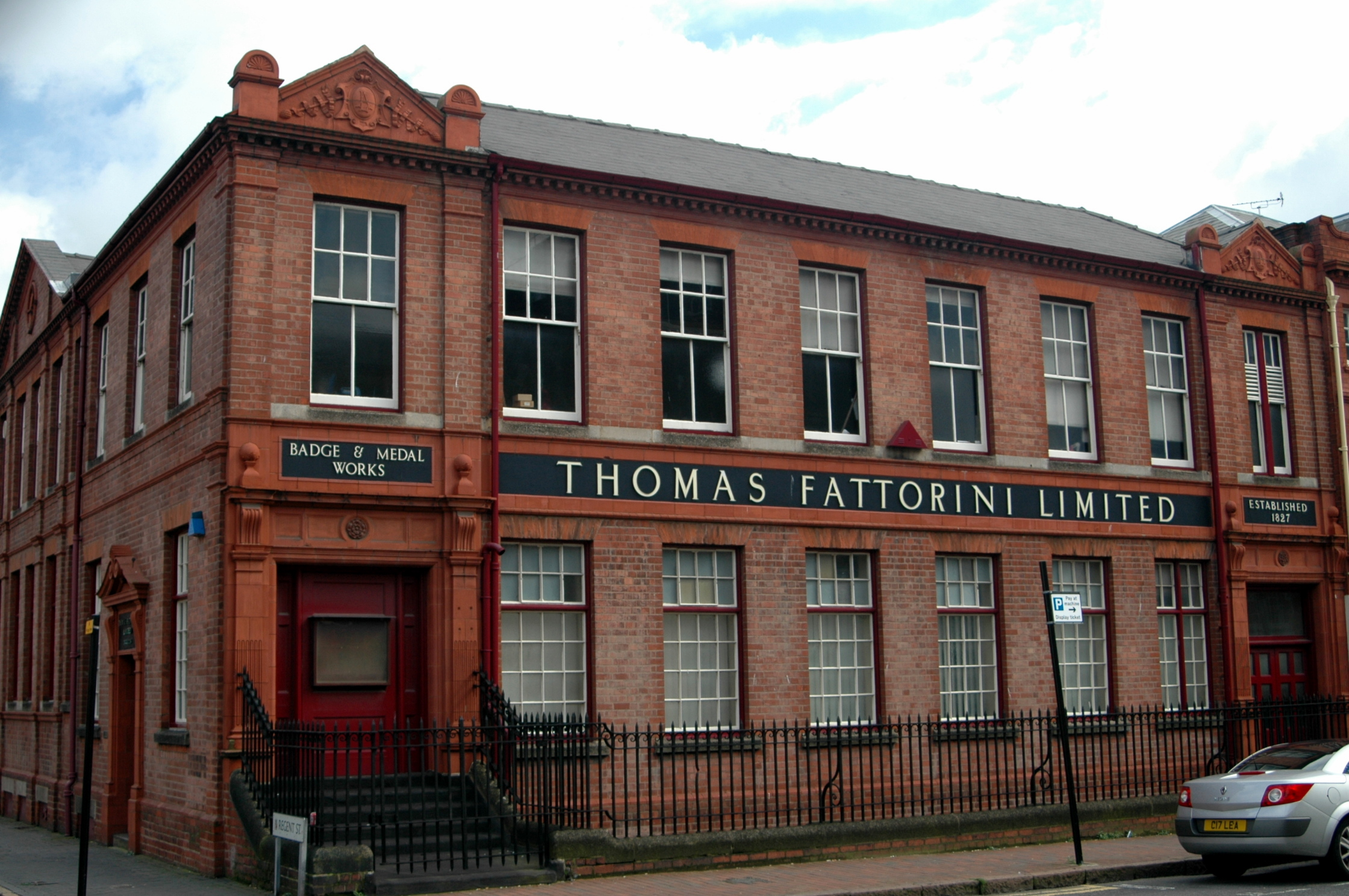
Thomas Fattorini factory in Birmingham

Thomas Fattorini Ltd is a manufacturing jeweller and designer-maker of awards, trophies, ceremonial swords, civic insignia, medals and name badges. The company is located on three sites: in Manchester, Birmingham and London with their head office in Skipton, North Yorkshire.

== History ==
The company was founded in 1827 by Antonio Fattorini, an Italian speaking immigrant, who was born in 1797, from Bellagio, near Como, in the north of Italy, and who settled in Yorkshire, where he began to trade in jewellery, watches and barometers. He was one of many Italian immigrants who came to in England between 1790s and 1851 at the time, when the Napoleonic wars left northern Italy with a destroyed agriculture and much hardship. The regional origins of most of the Italian immigrants were the valleys around Como and Lucca, with the people from Como, being skilled artisans, making barometers and other precision instruments.

The first record of him trading was at Upton Yard off Briggate, Leeds 1826. The retail outlets that he established were consolidated in the first generation into three enterprises: Thomas Fattorini in Skipton established in 1827 with the assistance of his brother-in-law Baldisaro Porri who was also a barometer maker and merchant in Skipton, Fattorini and Sons in Bradford in 1829, and Antonio Fattorini in Harrogate in 1831.

During the First World War the company manufactured badges for the armed forces, including the Royal Flying Corps (R.F.C) badge, and Home Front badges for civilians.

Thomas Fattorini Ltd registered its punch at various Assay offices: Birmingham (1918), Edinburgh (date?), London (date?) and Chester (1898).

The British Hallmarking Council chose a new commemorative mark to celebrate the Queen's Platinum Jubilee in 2022, which was designed by Thomas Fattorini. It depicts an Orb, and reflects the traditional fineness mark for platinum.

== The birth of mail order retailing in Britain ==
Mail Order retailing was founded in Britain by both Thomas Fattorini in Skipton and Fattorini & Sons in Bradford. They were the first companies that offered collective purchasing arrangements and began with the famous 'Watch clubs'. The rule of these clubs made it possible for individuals to buy otherwise-unaffordable goods, and latterly services, by regular instalments over a period of time. The first watch club was held in Skipton in 1869. By 1906 their 35th Annual club was offering pianos, leather travel goods, bicycles (Royal Wingfield, Singer & Humber), spectacles, Edison Bell phonographs, Pathephones and sewing machines for sale by weekly instalments from their stores in Skipton and Bolton. The business grew rapidly in the 1920s. Two Fattorini companies Empire Stores plc and Grattan plc (previously known as Grattan Warehouses Ltd) were listed on the London stock exchange.

== Manufacturers of badges, medals & trophies ==
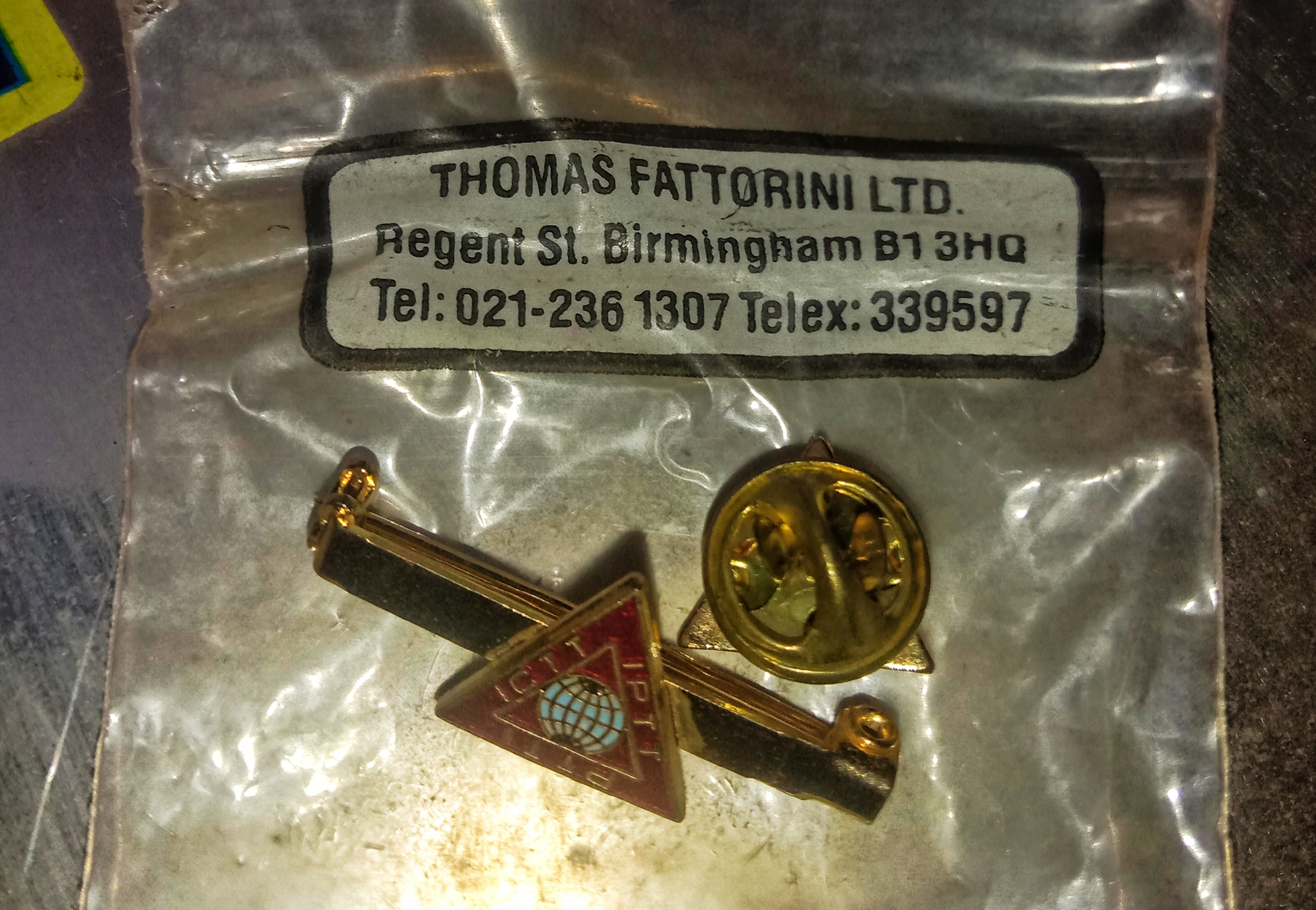
Vintage badge and button manufactured by the Thomas Fattorini Ltd, from a personal collection in West Bengal, India.

With the expanding trade in Skipton for medals and awards, the company opened its first factory in 1919 in Hockley street in the Jewellery Quarter Birmingham. In 1928 they moved into a purpose built Jewellery Factory on Regent Street, which was designed by Mansell & Mansell architects and built for Adie & Lovekin Ltd in 1894 who were also manufacturing jewellers. They renamed the Factory "Trafalgar Works". It was in this location that the company established themselves as manufacturer of vitreous enamel Badges, Medals and Trophies such as the Lonsdale Belt and the FIFA Club World Cup which is considered to be one of the worlds finest football trophies.

=== Medallist ===
Thomas Fattorini Ltd as medallists.

The earliest medals, that Thomas Fattorini made, were for sporting achievements. These were often attached to pocket watch chains, and so were also known as fob medals. These medals were mostly made in 9ct gold or sterling silver and sometimes enamelled. The medals were personalised on the reverse. In the 1930s, they were offering over 1000 of these medal designs, which were made to order.

Since 2002 the company has been supporting the British Art Medal Society (BAMS) student medal project which encourages and promotes the art of making medals throughout art colleges in the United Kingdom. Thomas Peter Fattorini (1932-2010) was present at the inaugural meeting of BAMS, held at the Royal Society of Arts on 27 April 1982 and served as vice president from the late 1980s until his death in November 2010.

In 2011 Thomas Fattorini Ltd was awarded the President's Medal by the British Art Medal Society and also the Marsh Award for the Encouragement of Medallic Art by the Marsh Christian Trust in recognition for making a significant contribution to the understanding, appreciation and encouragement of the art of the medal.

Thomas Fattorini Ltd played a pivotal role in the design and manufacture of Orders, Medals and Decorations for the key Ministries of the United Arab Emirates (Defence, Interior and Foreign Affairs) from the early 1980s through to the mid 2020s.

== Vitreous enamelling ==
It was in Birmingham where the company learned and developed its vitreous enamel skills. The company is known for its design and manufacture of livery and civic insignia which often uses the colourful enamel for the correct interpretation of Heraldry. The more typical items would be for livery jewels, civic chains of office, past officers pendants and badges. Enamels were also used decoratively on maces, medals, ceremonial swords and civic silverware.

The company made a replica vitreous enamelled version of the Alfred Jewel for the Ashmolean Museum

== Manufacturers of state insignia and national and international awards ==
The company was granted a Royal Warrant of Appointment to Her Majesty Queen Elizabeth II in 2008. Thomas R Fattorini (b.1960, 6th Generation) currently holds the warrant and is the grantee on behalf of Thomas Fattorini Ltd. The company has been manufacturing and supplying the Central Chancery of the Orders of Knighthood since 1975. The company manufactured the Montenegro Order of Danilo in 2010. The company exhibited at the Coronation Festival in Buckingham Palace, in London, in July 2013. This was a one-off occasion to celebrate the 'innovation, industry and excellence' of Royal Warrant Holders in the 60th Anniversary of The Queen's Coronation.
