= L. limosa =

L. limosa may refer to:

- Legenere limosa, an annual wildflower species endemic to limited portions of Northern California
- Limosa limosa, the black-tailed godwit, a shorebird species found from Iceland through Europe and areas of central Asia

== See also ==
- Limosa (disambiguation)
