= Quarff =

Coordinates: 60.104°N 1.237°W

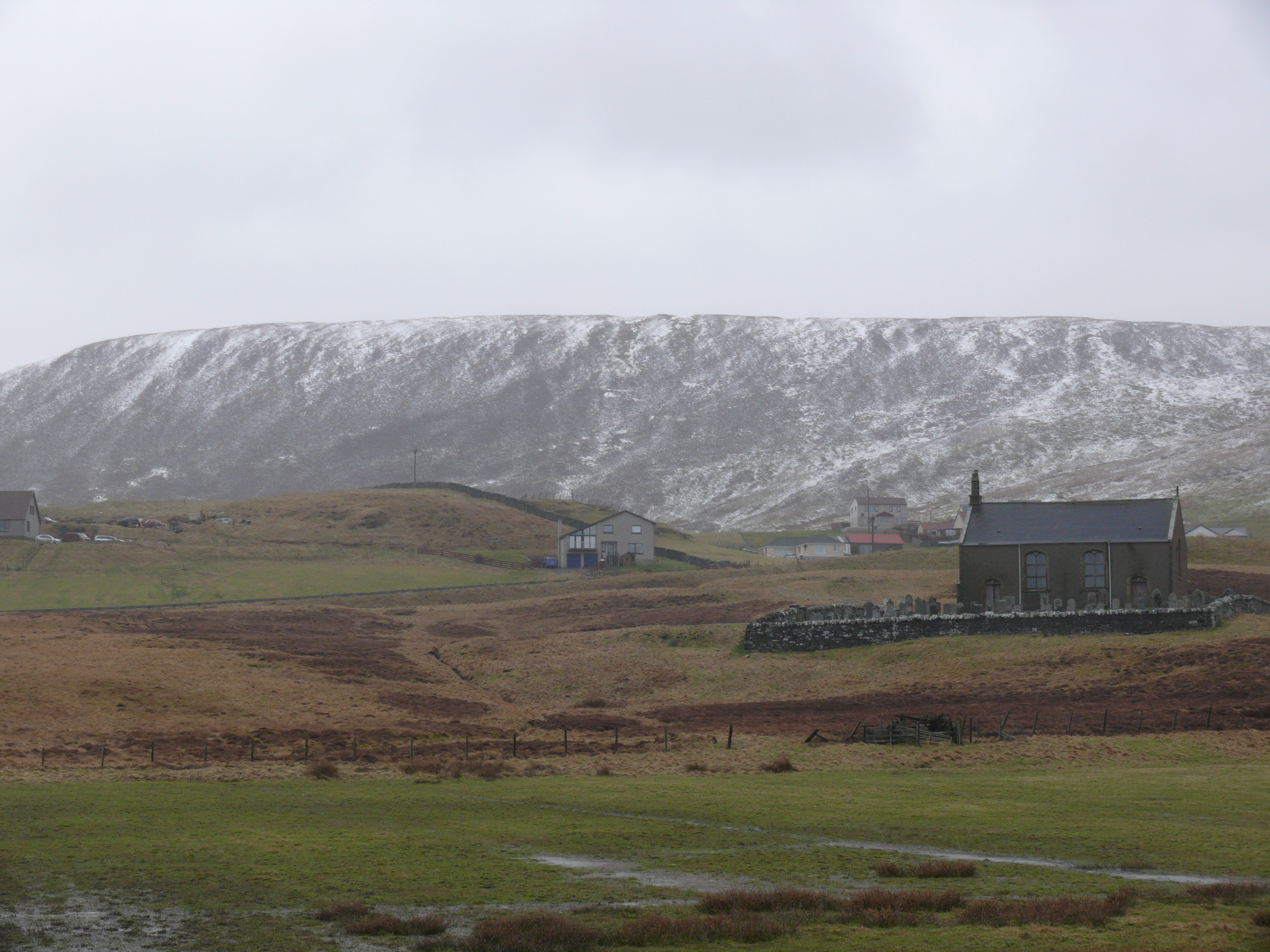
- View of Easter Quarff and Quarff church, with Scrae Field in the distance (March 2010)

- Location within Shetland
- Population: 100
- OS grid reference: HU424356
- Civil parish: Lerwick
- Council area: Shetland
- Lieutenancy area: Shetland
- Country: Scotland
- Sovereign state: United Kingdom
- Post town: SHETLAND
- Postcode district: ZE
- Dialling code: 01950
- Police: Scotland
- Fire: Scottish
- Ambulance: Scottish
- UK Parliament: Orkney and Shetland
- Scottish Parliament: Shetland

Quarff is a small village on Mainland in the Shetland Islands in Scotland. It is located on the main A970 road, 5 miles (8.0 km) south of Shetland's only town, Lerwick. The village is spread along a glacial valley that runs east–west across the island between high hills to north and south, with centres of population at Easter Quarff which is near the main road and the east coast, and Wester Quarff which is 1 1/2 miles (2.4 km) west and faces the Atlantic Ocean. A narrow road runs along the valley between the two.

== History ==
The name "Quarff" comes from Old Norse "Hvervi" and means a bending shape(John Stewart - Shetland Place-names Page 175). The north hill does indeed have a bend shape. The village has long been a site where goods and boats could be transported between the east and west coast, avoiding what would otherwise be a sea journey of about 40 miles (64 km) round Sumburgh Head. Sir John Sinclair reported in 1794 that "The people of Quarff are frequently employed in transporting goods from one side of the country to the other, which brings them in considerable sums."

In 1830, when the church was built, the villagers were reported to be mostly sea fishermen, catching cod, ling and herring. They also cultivated small patches of land, growing potatoes and corn.

There is evidence of Stone Age occupation in the area. In 1900 a local crofter excavated a mound on his croft and found a stone slab covering a stone-lined chamber containing a skull and a bowl. Similar chambers were found in the locality.

== Population ==
In 2004 there were over 70 dwellings. Wester Quarff has thirteen dwellings in small clusters.

== Infrastructure ==
The Quarff water supply is from the Sandy Loch reservoir at Lerwick. There is no mains drainage in Quarff; each property has its own septic tank.

== Quarff church ==
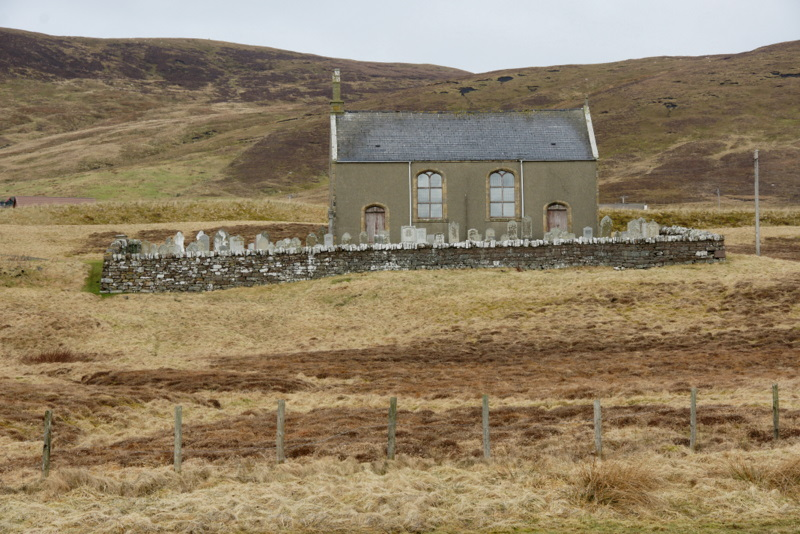
Quarff church

Quarff Government church and manse in Easter Quarff were completed in 1830, to a design by Thomas Telford. It is located on a rising bank about 500 yards (460 m) from the sea-shore, and its first minister, James Gardner, was inducted in September 1830. In 1843 his allegiance was called into question however, and in June 1843 his name appears in a list of ministers who had given their adhesion to the Free Presbyterian Church in Scotland in the Disruption of 1843. The "parish living" in Quarff became vacant and Alexander Webster was appointed on 31 July 1843.

The church was described in 1845 as "a beautiful and commodious building built to contain 320." The area experienced a Christian revival in 1863; a contemporaneous report reads: "Formerly Quarff was noted for its coldness and apathy in matters of religion ... Now, however, the people are in the deepest concern about the interests of their souls".

== Education ==
The Quarff Primary School catered for local children in the 5 to 12 age range, and was open from 1879 until it was closed by the council in 2003. In 2001 the school won an award from the National Association for Gallery Education for a long-term art project involving the whole school (12 pupils with teacher Anne Halford-MacLeod), Bonhoga Gallery and artist Ruth Brownlee.

School roll – Quarff Primary School
| Year | 1971 | 1976 | 1981 | 1986 | 1991 | 1996 | 2001 | 2004 |
| Population | 17 | 19 | 23 | 21 | 15 | 10 | 12 | n/a |

The number of pupils decreased from a peak of 25 in 1987 to only 12 in 2001, thought to be a result of parents working in Lerwick taking their children to Lerwick schools. When the teacher moved to Cunningsburgh School in 2003 the school was closed and the pupils were transferred to the school in Cunningsburgh 4 miles (6.4 km) to the south. School transport is available.

== Gallery ==
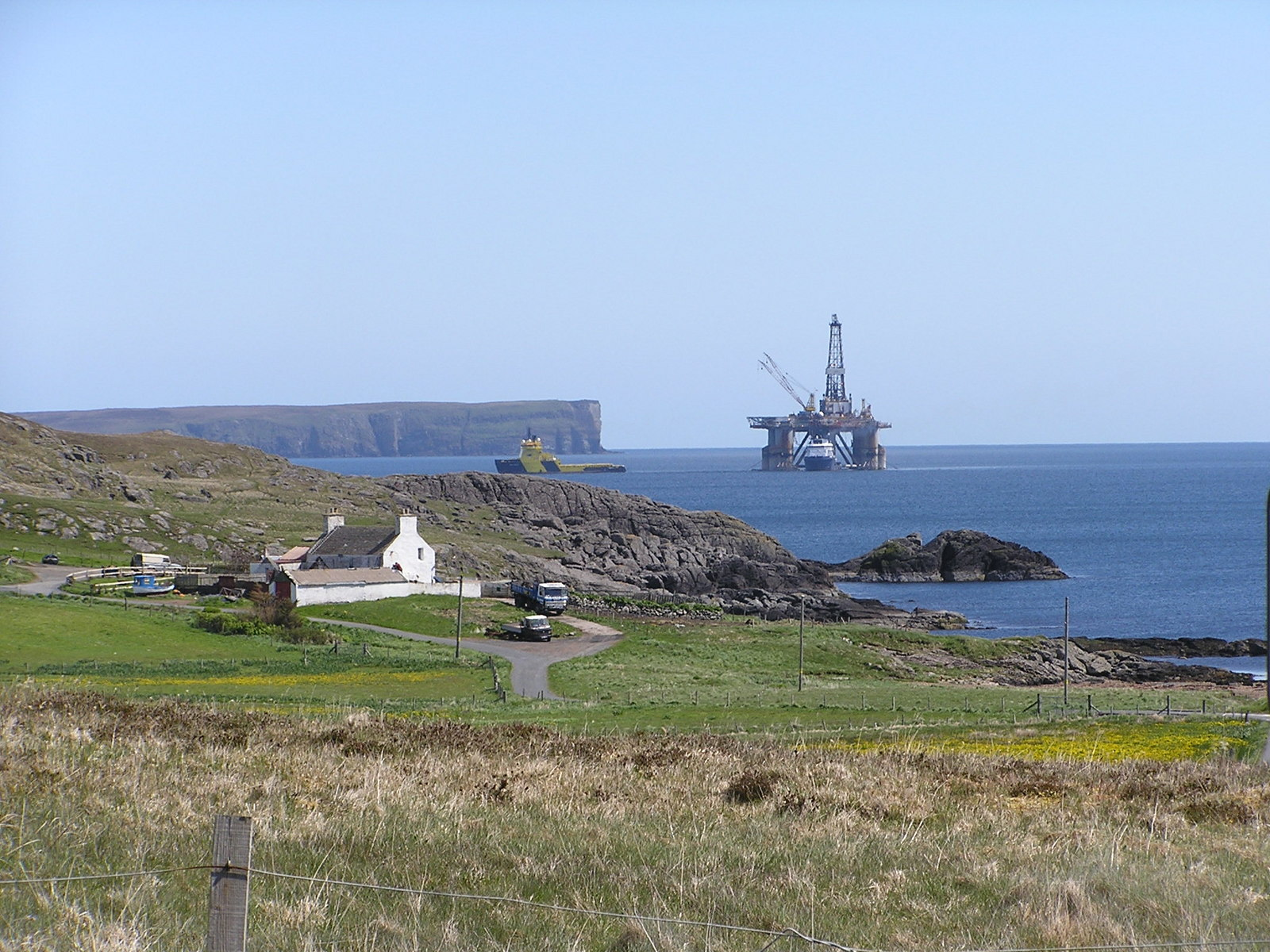
Easter Quarff and the oil rig GSF Arctic IV

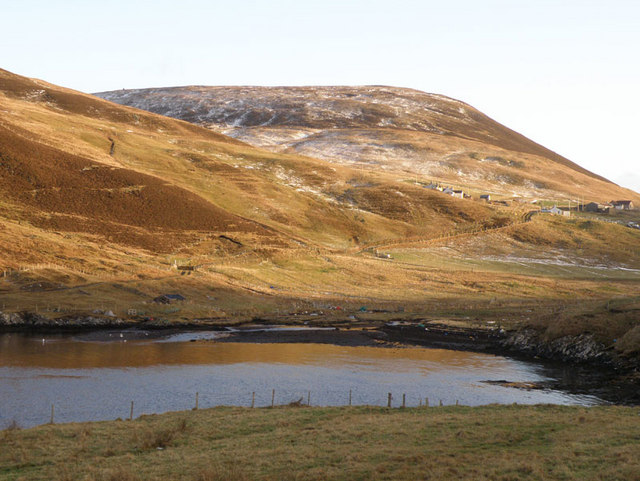
Wester Quarff

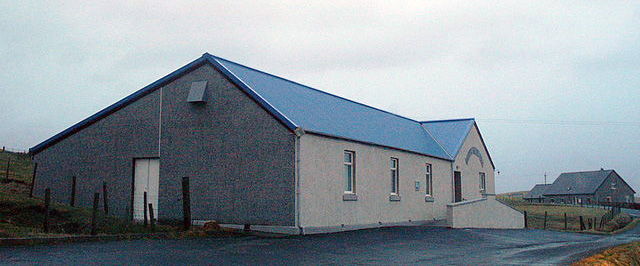
Quarff Public Hall

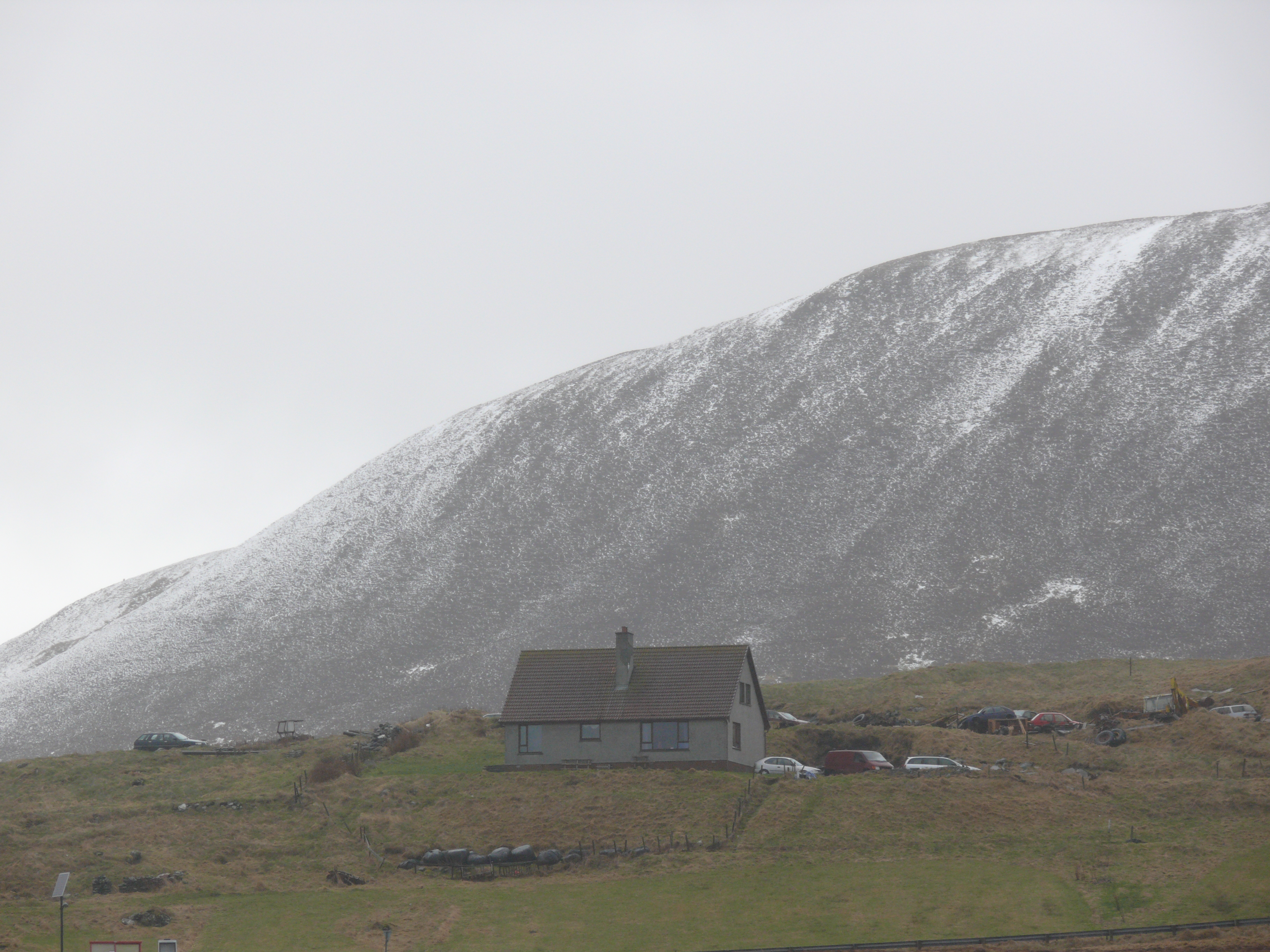
House in Easter Quarff, with Scrae Field behind
