= British Art Medal Society =

The British Art Medal Society (BAMS) was founded in 1982 to promote the art of the medal through commissions, exhibitions, publications and events. The society is affiliated to FIDEM (the Fédération Internationale de la Médaille d’Art).

Mark Jones, the then curator of British Museum Department of Coins and Medals at the British Museum, and Ron Dutton, a medallist and sculptor, were key people in forming the society, when its formation was announced in the US periodical Coin World.

BAMS commissions medals from internationally recognised sculptors as well as from students and recent art college graduates. Portraiture, abstraction, political comment and celebration are all features of their medals. Most are cast in bronze and patinated by the artist. The society also gives advice to individuals and organisations who are thinking of commissioning a medal.

== Publications ==
The Medal, the Society’s international journal, is published by the British Art Medal Trust and also based at the British Museum Department of Coins and Medals, London. Fully illustrated, it contains articles on historical and contemporary medals and their makers, book reviews, and news about medallic events and exhibitions worldwide. The society occasionally publishes other books of medallic interest.

=== Books ===
- Christian Wermuth: ein Deutscher Medailleur der Barockzeit - a German medallist of the Baroque age.
- The Pingo family and medal making in 18th-century Britain
- Designs on posterity. Drawings for medals
- British art medals
- The new medallists
- Contemporary art medals: The BAMS Student Medal Project XXVI/2020

== The President’s Medal ==
The President's Medal is awarded to individuals and organisations that have demonstrated a longstanding commitment to the study of historical medals and/or the production of contemporary medals. The President’s Medal has been awarded to:

- 2009 The British Museum
- 2010 Francis Dineley
- 2011 Thomas Fattorini Ltd
- 2012 Bogomil Nikolov
- 2013 The Simmons Gallery
- 2014 Worshipful Company of Founders
- 2015 Worshipful Company of Cutlers
- 2016 School of Art, Falmouth University
- 2017 Royal Mint Museum
- 2018 Professor Stephen K. Scher
- 2019 Brian Hill
- 2020 American Numismatic Society
- 2021 Parviz Tanavoli

== Marsh Award for the Encouragement of Medallic Art ==
The Marsh Award for the Encouragement of Medallic Art is run by the Marsh Charitable Trust in partnership with BAMS. Its aim is to recognise an individual or organisation that has made a significant contribution to the understanding, appreciation and encouragement of the art of the medal. These have been awarded since 2011. Previous winners are:

- 2011 Thomas Fattorini Ltd Manufacturer of high-quality medals
- 2012 Professor Bogomil Nikolov. Professor at the National Academy of Arts in Sofia Bulgaria; a lone voice promoting medallic art in his country
- 2013 Howard and Frances Simmons. For providing professional specialist knowledge to collectors of coins
- 2014 Andrew Griffiths. Head of Sculpture at Carmarthen School of Art passionately and involved in the BAMS Student Medal Project since 1999
- 2015 Arnold Nieuwendam. Dutch painter, photographer, publisher and supporter of BAMS
- 2016 David Reid. artist, founder and educator; longstanding commitment to art medals; the innovations he has made in bronze casting
- 2017 Kate Harrison. Former Head of Jewellery at Loughborough School of Art and Design. Teacher, medallist, symposium organiser; reinstatement of the medal as a category in the Goldsmiths’ Company craft competition
- 2018 Lucy Willow. Lead Teacher in the Department of Sculpture at Falmouth University’s School of Art. Passionate supporter of Student Medal Project; Medallist
- 2019 Giles Last, Head of Jewellery at Central Saint Martins. He has made the Student Medal Project part of the Jewellery Department curriculum around 2005.
- 2020 Lisa McGovern, Curriculum Head of Craft and Design at City of Glasgow College
- 2021 Dauvit Alexander, Birmingham School of Jewellery
- 2022 Roddy Mathieson, Duncan of Jordanstone College of Art & Design

== Student Medal Project ==
In 1994 the society initiated the Student Medal Project. The Director is Marcy Leavitt Bourne. The project was designed to introduce art colleges in the UK and their students to the art medal. It offers students the challenge of designing and making an art medal on any subject, enabling them to participate in an international art project, learn bronze casting, have a chance to exhibit nationally & internationally, win a prize and have their work published. One of the prizes is sponsored by the Worshipful Company of Cutlers who are supporters of the project. The Honourable Mention Prize is awarded by Bigbury Mint Ltd.
