= Jane Reid =

British evolutionary ecologist

- Education: University of Cambridge(BA), University of Glasgow (PhD)
- Scientific career
- Workplaces: University of British Columbia, University of Cambridge, University of Aberdeen, Norwegian University of Science and Technology

Jane Reid is an evolutionary ecologist from the UK, she is International Chair Professor at the Norwegian University of Science and Technology (NTNU) in Trondheim, Norway and is also Professor of Population & Evolutionary Ecology at the University of Aberdeen.

== Career ==
Reid was educated at the University of Cambridge studying Natural Sciences, she then did a PhD in behavioural ecology at the University of Glasgow. She did a Killam Postdoctoral Fellowship at the University of British Columbia and then a Junior Research Fellowship at Jesus College, Cambridge. In 2006 she moved to the University of Aberdeen as a Royal Society University Research Fellow and was made Professor of Population & Evolutionary Ecology in 2014. In 2019 she was made International Chair Professor at NTNU.

Reid works at the interface of evolutionary and population ecology, in particular of birds. Her research has included the evolutionary implications of mating behaviours, the impacts of dispersal on population viability, and the role of extreme climatic events in driving eco-evolutionary dynamics.

To support this work she was awarded a prestigious European Research Council Starting Grant (2013-2018) and an Advanced Grant (2024-2029).

== Books ==
Chapter 39 Don't just sit there reading, in Curious About Nature: A Passion for Fieldwork by Tim Burt and Des Thompson, published by Cambridge University Press in 2020.

== Honours and awards ==
- Awarded the Zoological Society of London's Scientific Medal in 2012.
- Awarded the Marsh Award for Ornithology by the British Trust for Ornithology and the Marsh Christian Trust in 2013.
- Awarded the University of Aberdeen Principal's Prize for Public Engagement with Research in 2013.
- Elected a Fellow of the Royal Society of Edinburgh in 2017.
