= Koudum =

- Village
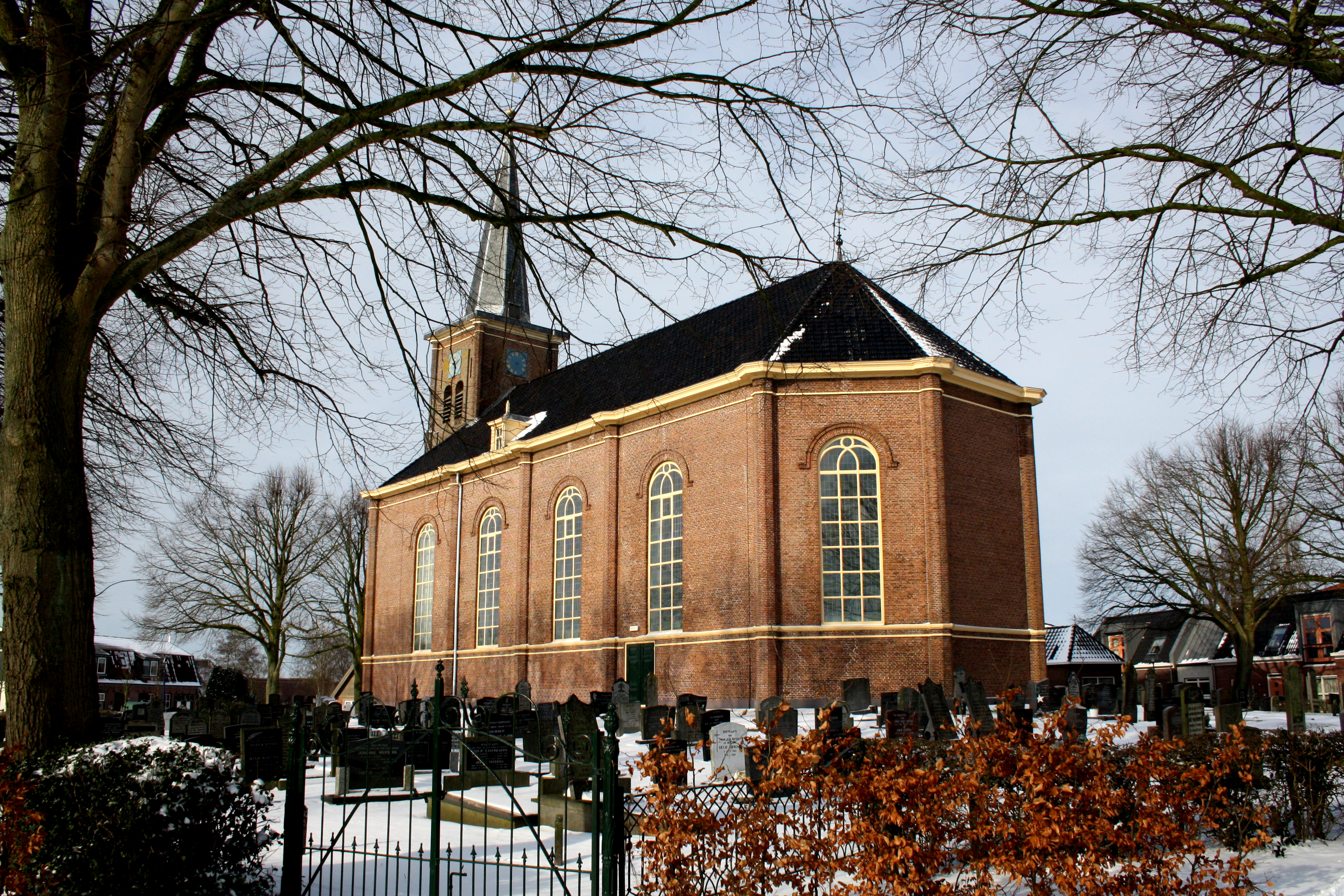
- Martini church

- Flag Coat of arms

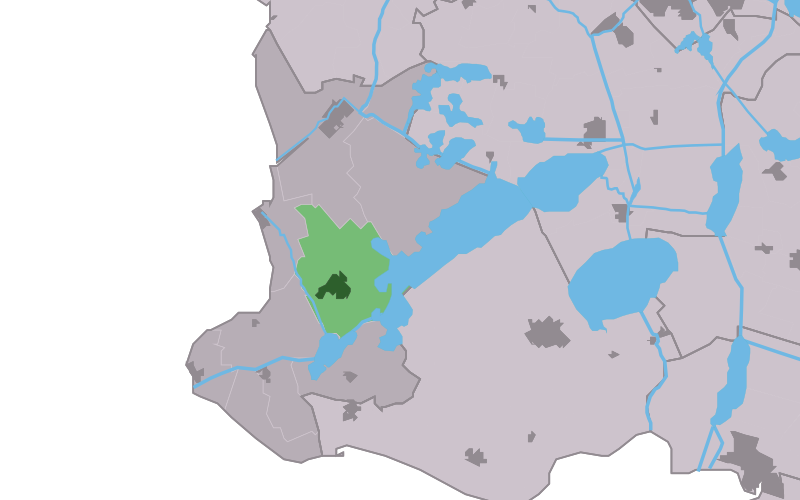
- Location in the former Nijefurd municipality

- Location in the Netherlands Koudum (Netherlands)
- Country: Netherlands
- Province: Friesland
- Municipality: Súdwest-Fryslân

Area
  - Total: 16.75 km^{2} (6.47 sq mi)
- Elevation: 6 m (20 ft)

Population (2021)
  - Total: 2,660
  - Density: 159/km^{2} (411/sq mi)
- Time zone: UTC+1 (CET)
  - Summer (DST): UTC+2 (CEST)
- Postal code: 8723
- Dialing code: 0514
- Website: https://koudum.nl

Koudum (West Frisian pronunciation: [ˈkɔudəm]) is a village in the northern Netherlands. It is located in Súdwest-Fryslân, Friesland. Nearby villages include Molkwerum to the west, Workum to the north and Hemelum to the south. The population of Koudum was 2,700 in 2019. The nearest train station is the Koudum-Molkwerum railway station.

There is a restored windmill in the village, De Vlijt.

== History ==
The village was first mentioned in 855 as Coluuidum, and means "charcoal woods". Koudum developed on the higher clay ground in the Gaasterland region. It used to be a linear settlement with a little centre around the church. Koudum was the capital of the former municipality of Hemelumer Oldeferd until 1984.

Between 1614 and 1617, a church was built with a 60 metres (200 ft) high tower, however both the church and tower were replaced by a new church in 1857 with a more modest tower.

Koudum was home to 925 people in 1840. Before 2011, Koudum was the seat of the former municipality of Nijefurd. Before 1984, it was part of Hemelumer Oldeferd municipality.

== Population ==
- 1954 - 1,966
- 1959 - 1,861
- 1964 - 1,915
- 1969 - 2,213
- 1973 - 2,268
- 2004 - 2,600
- 2017 - 2,695
- 2019 - 2,700

== De Vlijt ==
De Vlijt is a restored windmill in the village. The mill was originally built in the 18th century as a polder mill in Oppenhuizen or Sneek. In 1986, the mill was moved to its current location and rebuilt into a corn rack mill.

== Gallery ==
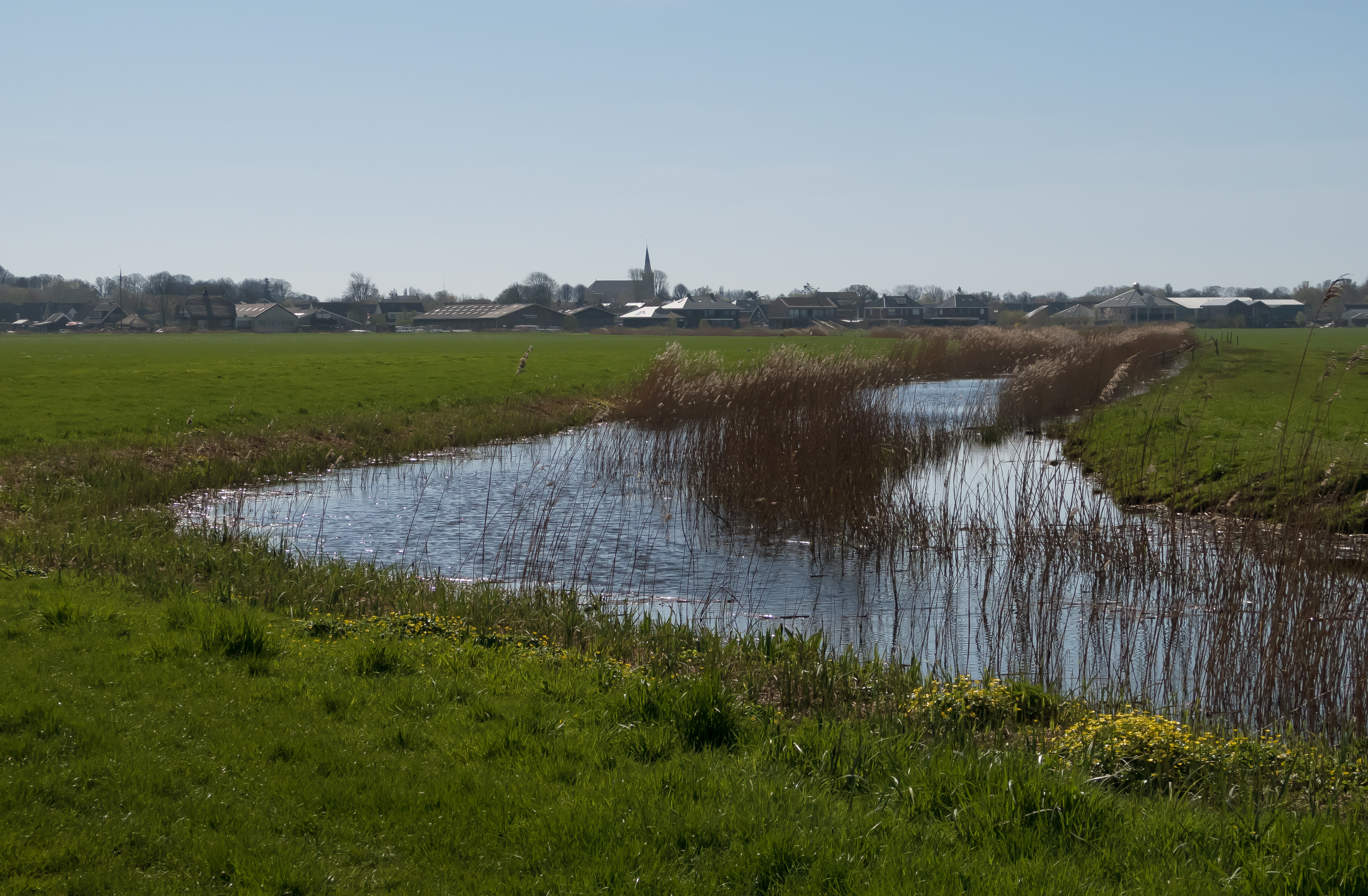
View to the village from the polder

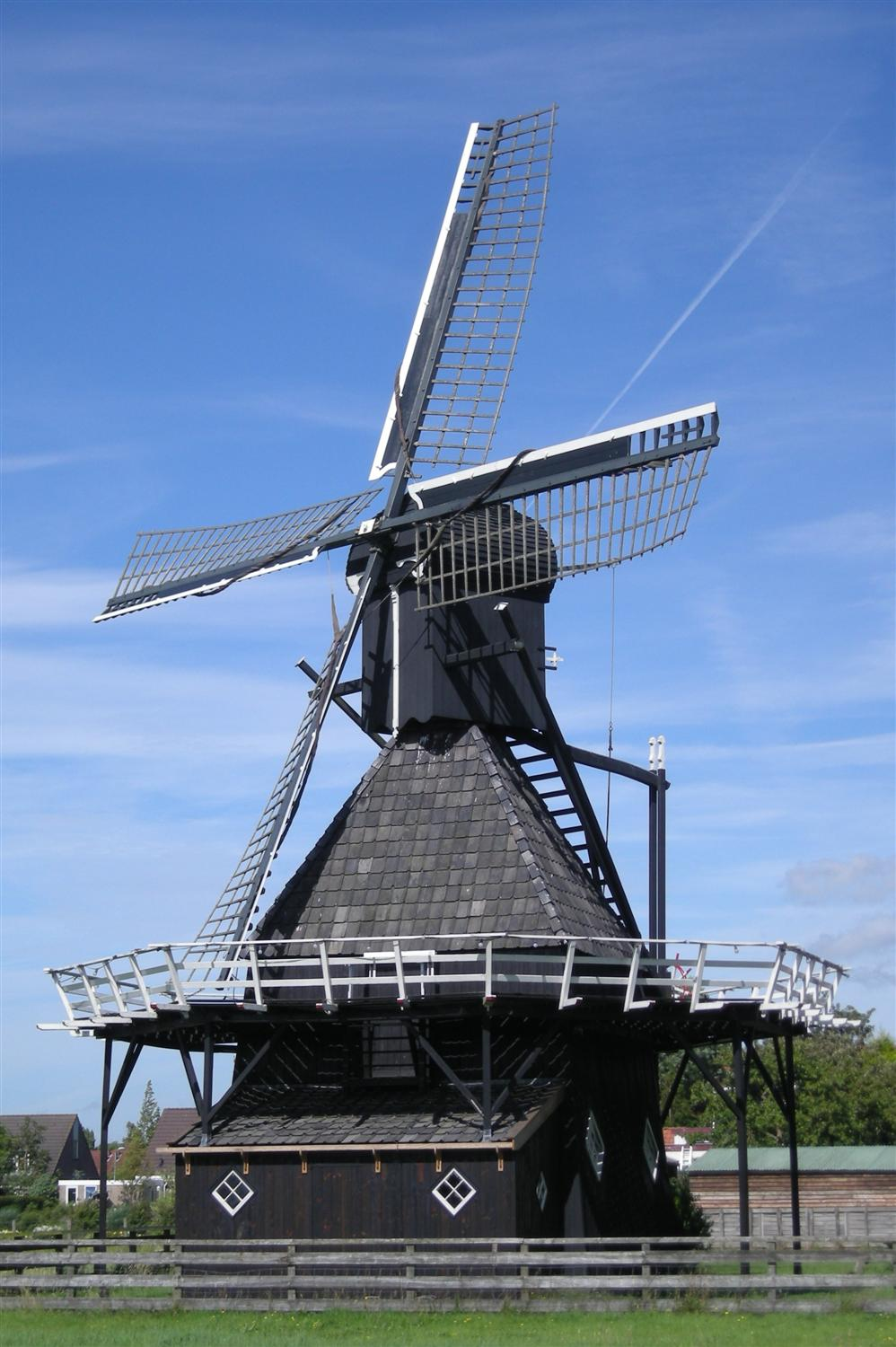
Windmill De Vlijt

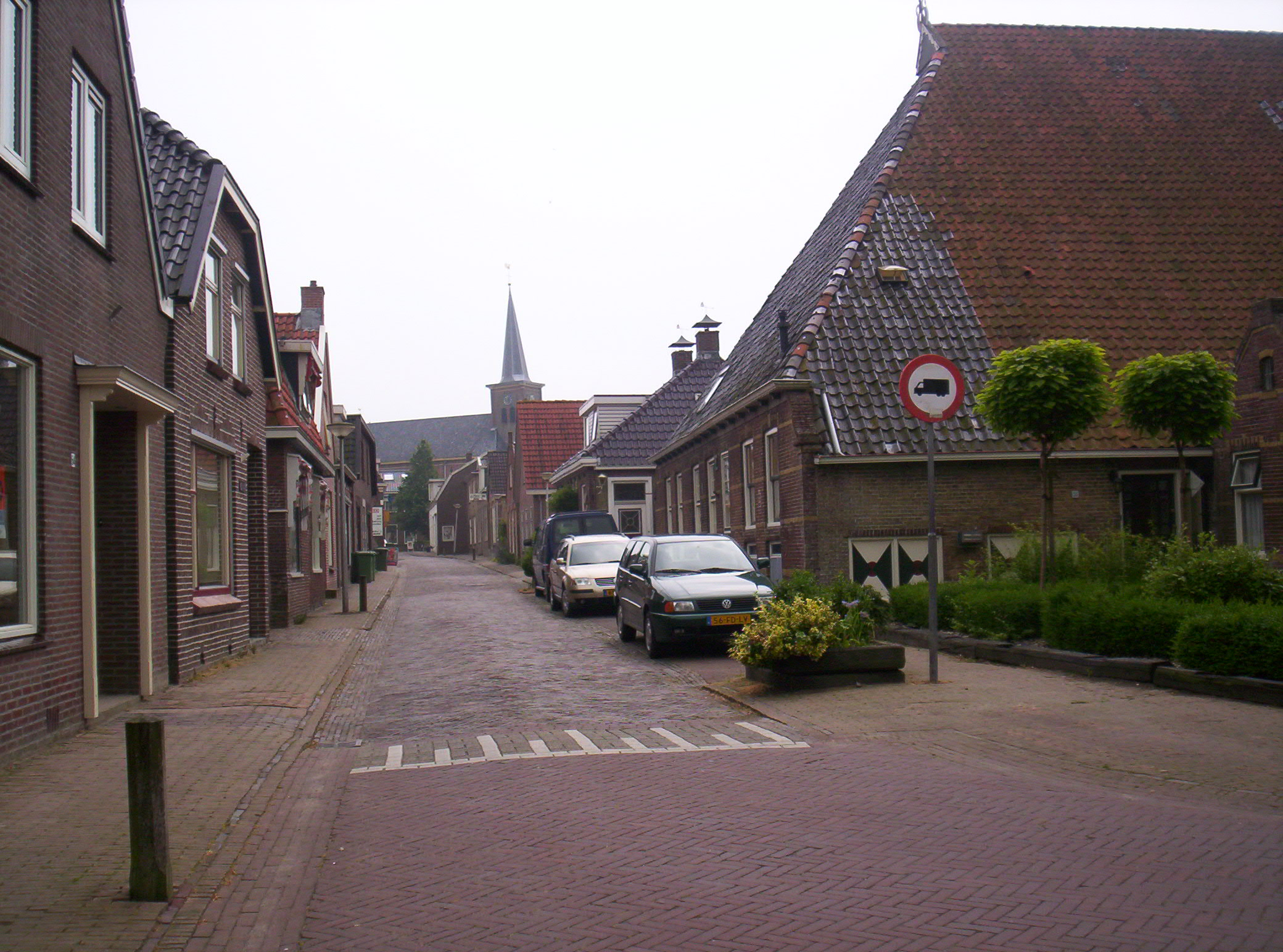
Street view

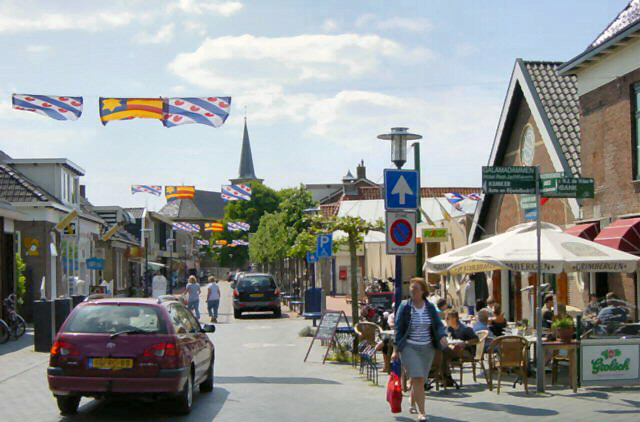
Village centre
