= Marsh Awards for Ornithology =

The five Marsh Awards for Ornithology are among over 40 Marsh Awards and are issued in the United Kingdom by the Marsh Charitable Trust and the British Trust for Ornithology (BTO), in the field of ornithology.

== The Marsh Award for Ornithology ==
Given:

For an ornithologist who is making a significant contribution to the field, typically someone who gained a PhD between ten and twenty years prior to the award being made.

- 2010: Dr Jenny Gill, British Ornithologists' Union (BOU) President
- 2011: Dr Ian Hartley (former Chairman of the BOU's Ibis Management Committee
- 2012: Professor Jeremy Wilson, head of research for RSPB Scotland
- 2013: Dr Jane Reid
- 2014: Dr Francis Daunt
- 2015: Stuart Butchart
- 2016: Professor Will Cresswell
- 2017: Becki Lawson, Research Fellow at the Zoological Society of London
- 2018: Dr Juliet Vickery
- 2019: Dr Dan Chamberlain
- 2020: Dr Jen Smart
- 2021: Dr Alison Johnston
- 2022: Dr Alex Bond
- 2023: Aldina Franco
- 2024: Dirk Raes
- 2025: Rob Thomas
- 2026: Will Peach

== The Marsh Local Ornithology Award ==
Given:

For a bird club or group that publishes a book, completes a study or conducts any other exceptional activity in the preceding calendar year that advances knowledge about birds.

- 2010: Cheshire & Wirral Ornithology Society
- 2011: Henfield Birdwatch
- 2012: Chris Dee and the Herts Bird Club for their online bird atlas
- 2013: Arran Natural History Society
- 2014: Friends of Skokholm & Skomer
- 2015: Malcolm Burgess & Piedfly.net
- 2016: Cross & Stratford Welsh Chough Project
- 2017: Bardsey Bird and Field Observatory
- 2018: Spurn Bird Observatory
- 2019: Mike Smart
- 2020: Scottish Ornithologists' Club
- 2021: Vic Fairbrother and Ken Hutchinson
- 2022: The Chilterns Landscape Partnership project 'Tracking the Impact'
- 2023: Royal Air Force Ornithological Society
- 2024: Woodpecker Network
- 2025: Hampshire Ornithological Society
- 2026: Lower Derwent Valley Conservation Group

== The Marsh Award for Innovative Ornithology ==
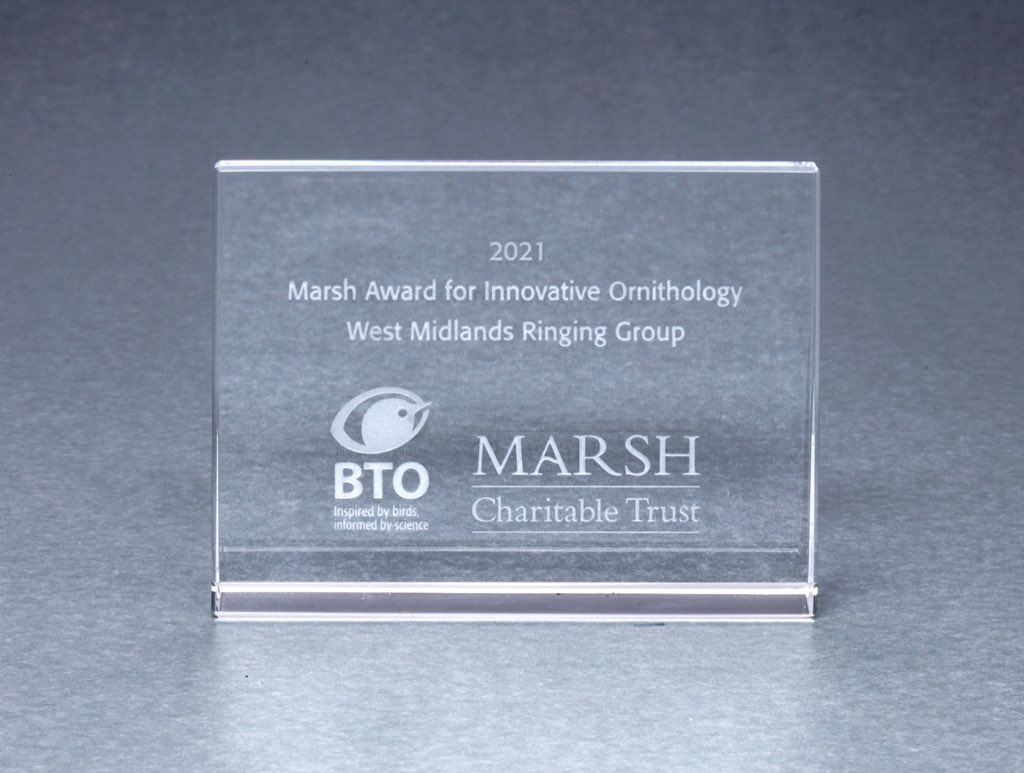
The 2021 Marsh Award for Innovative Ornithology

Introduced in 2012 to celebrate:

an important contribution which takes forward our understanding of avian ecology or conservation science

it was last awarded in 2022.

- 2012: The BTO's Cuckoo Team for their satellite tracking project
- 2013: Dr Christian Rutz
- 2014: The Spoon-billed Sandpiper Recovery Team
- 2015: Mark Constantine & The Sound Approach
- 2016: Dick Newell and Action For Swifts
- 2017: Ben Kibel for his Hookpod design
- 2018: Dr Stuart Newson
- 2019: EuroBirdPortal (Gabriel Gargallo & David Marti)
- 2020: Project Puffin (Dr Ellie Own)
- 2021: West Midlands Ringing Group
- 2022: Rob Clements

== The Marsh Award for International Ornithology ==
Introduced in 2013 and awarded to:

an individual scientist whose work on the international stage has had significant influence on British ornithology, especially as reflected in the work of BTO scientists and volunteers

it was last awarded in 2021.

- 2013: Lars Svensson
- 2014: Dr Shiiwua Manu
- 2015: Franz Bairlein
- 2016: Professor Pertti Saurola
- 2017: Theunis Piersma
- 2018: David Stroud
- 2019: Dr Petr Voříšek
- 2020: Dr Verena Keller
- 2021: Prof Lukas Jenni

== The Marsh Award for Young Ornithologist ==
Introduced in 2015 and awarded to:

an individual (or group of people) under the age of 21 who has/have made a significant contribution to BTO bird monitoring schemes and shared this information with their peers

- 2015: Findlay Wilde
- 2016: Josie Hewitt
- 2017: Toby Carter
- 2018: Louis Driver
- 2019: Kabir Kaul
- 2020: Mike Sinclair
- 2021: Siân Mercer
- 2022: Anna Webberley
- 2023: Mya Bambrick
- 2024: Katie Monk
- 2025: Ramandeep Nijjar
- 2026: Rufus Dawson

== See also ==
- List of ornithology awards
