= Limosa (disambiguation) =

Limosa is a bird genus.

Limosa may also refer to:

- Limosa (magazine), magazine from Sovon, the Dutch Centre for Field Ornithology
- Sapo Limosa, or Limosa harlequin frog (Atelopus limosus), an endangered toad species endemic to Panama
- 8765 Limosa, a minor planet

== See also ==
- List of Latin and Greek words commonly used in systematic names#L
