= It Heidenskip =

It Heidenskip Heidenschap
- Village
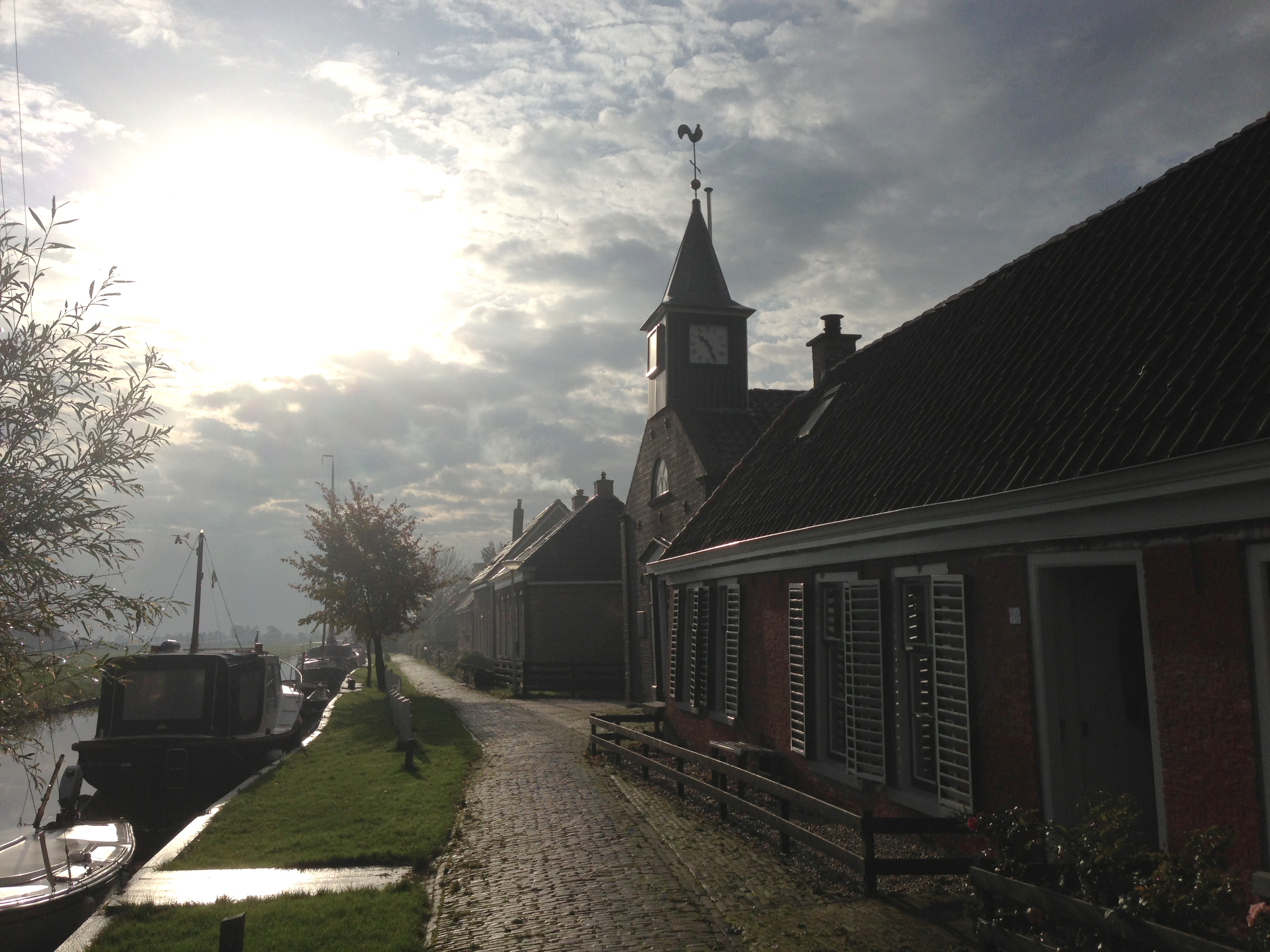

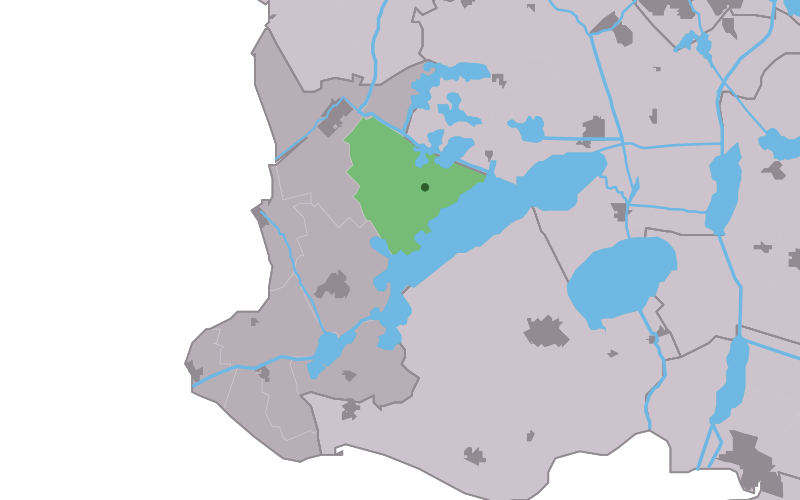
- Location in the former Nijefurd municipality

- Location in the Netherlands It Heidenskip (Netherlands)
- Country: Netherlands
- Province: Friesland
- Municipality: Súdwest-Fryslân

Area
  - Total: 25.33 km^{2} (9.78 sq mi)
- Elevation: −0.4 m (−1.3 ft)

Population (2021)
  - Total: 330
  - Density: 13/km^{2} (34/sq mi)
- Time zone: UTC+1 (CET)
  - Summer (DST): UTC+2 (CEST)
- Postal code: 8553
- Dialing code: 0515

It Heidenskip (West Frisian pronunciation: [ət ˈhɛidn̩skɪp]; Dutch: Heidenschap [ˈɦɛidə(n)sxɑp]) is a village in Súdwest-Fryslân in the province of Friesland, the Netherlands. It had a population of around 335 in January 2017.

== History ==
The village was first mentioned in 1511 as Heijdenscip, and means "wild growth on land". It Heidenskip is a long linear settlement. It is a relative new settlement. In 1851, it contained two buildings and a ferry. The name used for the area between the city of Workum and the Fluessen lake. During the 19th century, a settlement developed in Brandeburen.

The oldest church dated from 1389, but was demolished and a farm was built in its place. In the 19th century, a small Mennonite church was built, which resulted in the construction of a Dutch Reformed church. In 1979, it was elevated to the status of village. Before 2011, the village was part of the Nijefurd municipality. Before 1984 it partly belonged to Hemelumer Oldeferd and partly to Workum.

== Gallery ==
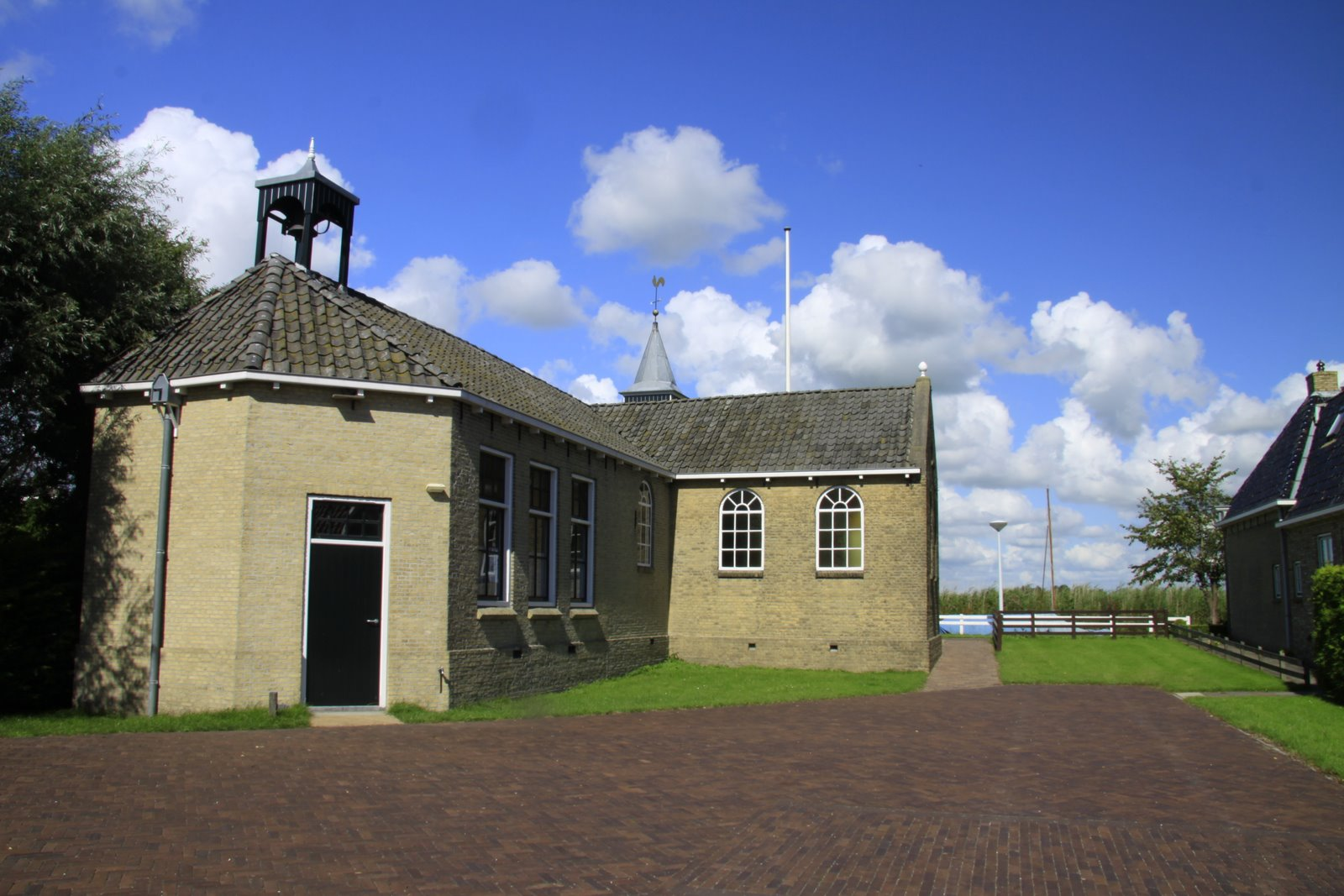
Church of It Heidenskip

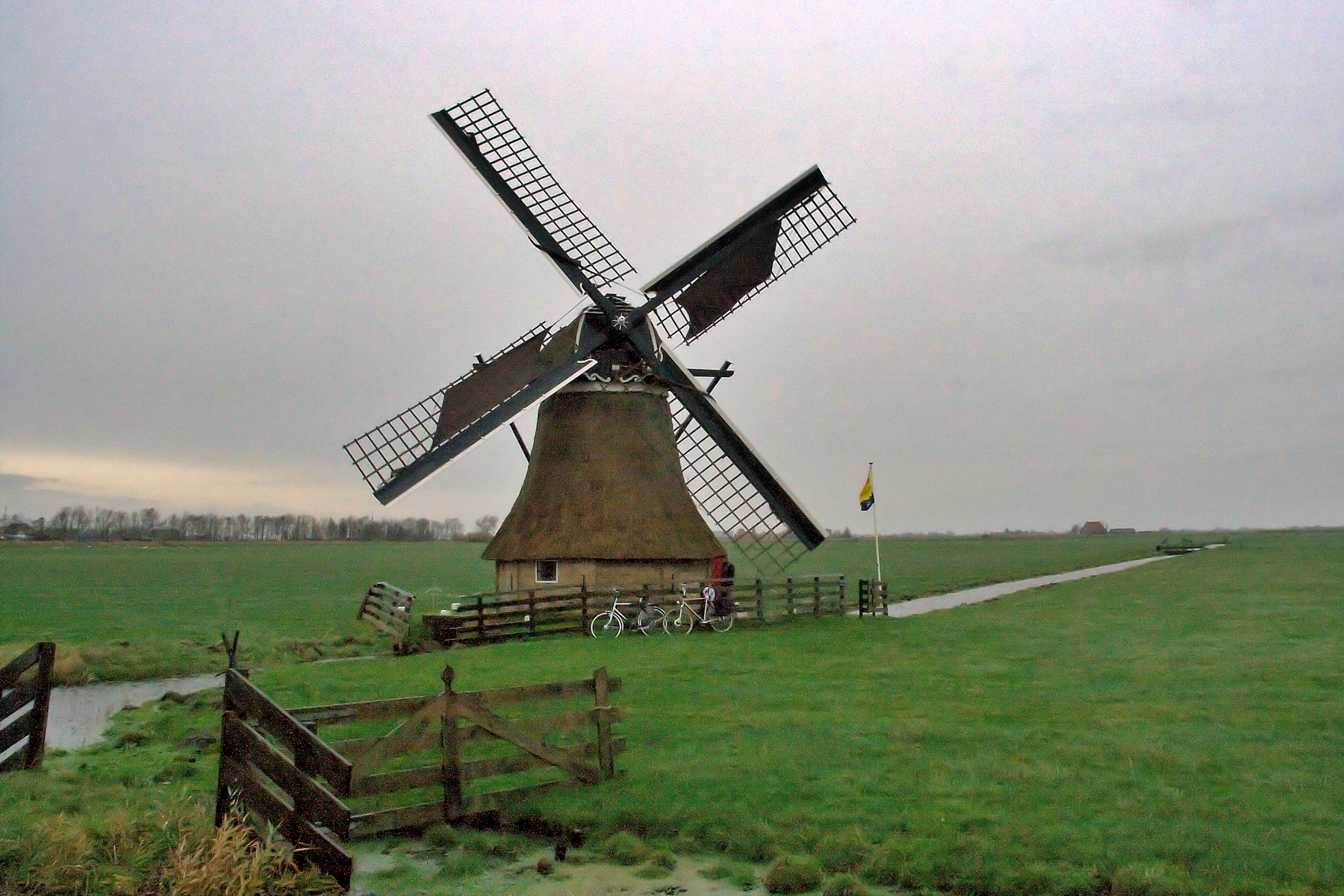
Wind mill De Snip

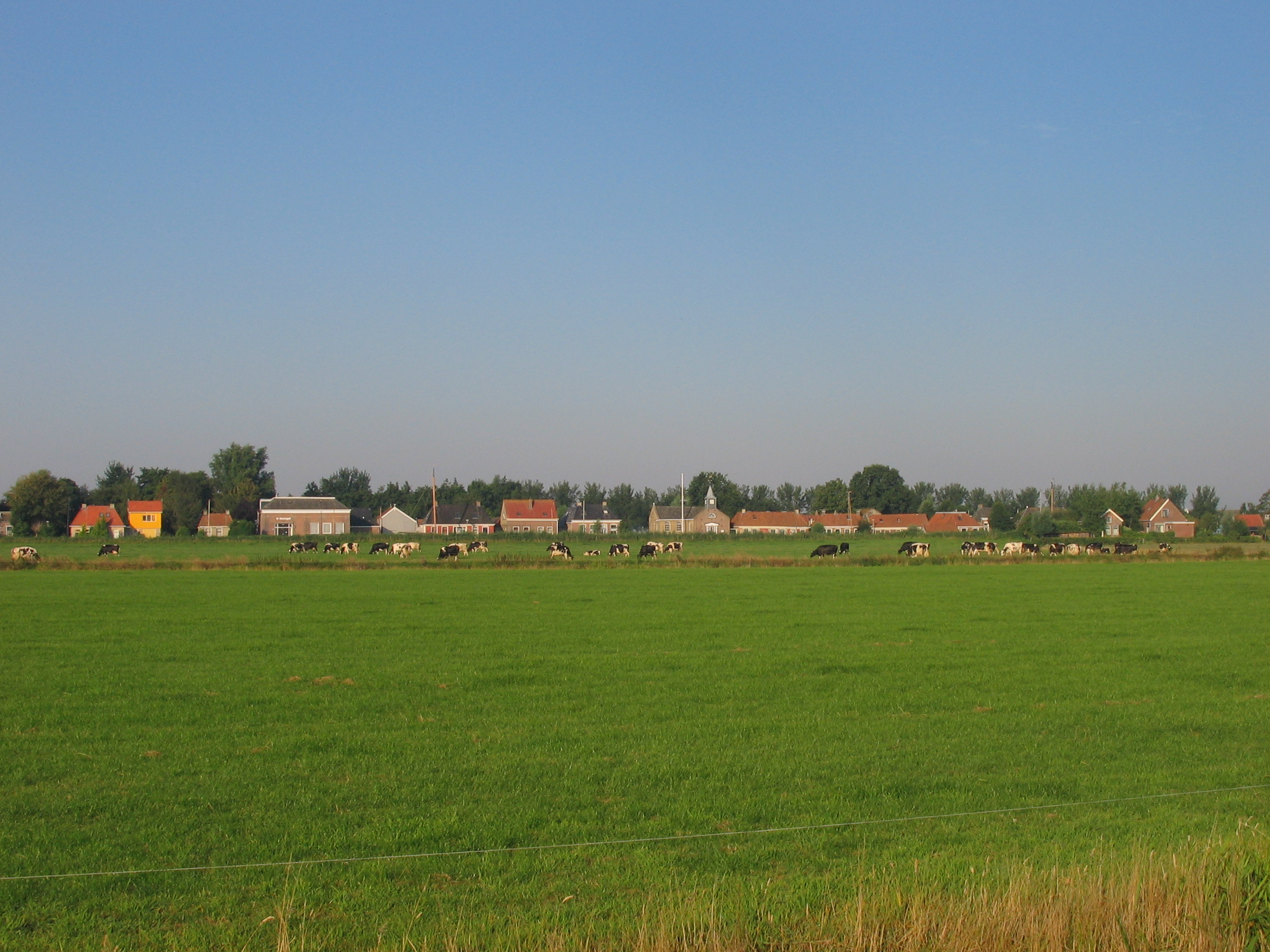
View on Branburren

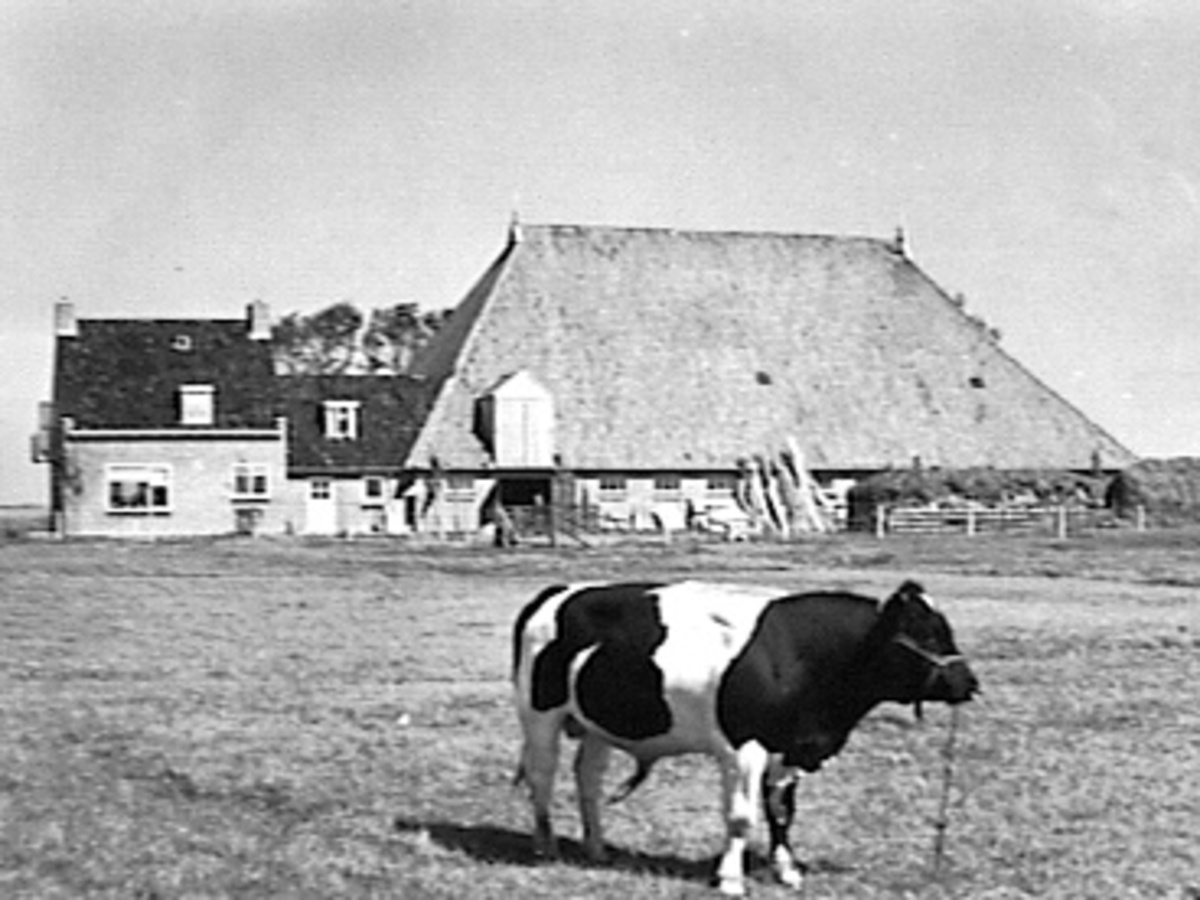
Farm with bull (1957)
