= Vogelbescherming Nederland =

Dutch bird protection organisation

- Formation: 1899
- Headquarters: Zeist, Netherlands
- Leader: M. Herkemij-Westernan
- Website: www.vogelbescherming.nl

Vogelbescherming Nederland (in English: Society for the Protection of Birds, Netherlands) is the national bird protection organisation for the Netherlands. It is a non-governmental organisation, and it is the Dutch partner in BirdLife International.

Vogelbescherming Nederland is one of the oldest existing bird conservation societies. It was founded in 1899 (under the name Vereeniging tot Bescherming van Vogels), based in part on a forerunner society Bond ter Bestrijding eener Gruwelmode founded in 1892 whose mission was primarily to oppose the hunting of birds for the use of their feathers in fashion.

Among other public events, Vogelbescherming organises the annual Tuinvogeltelling (garden bird count).

== See also ==
- Sovon
