= Nijefurd =

- Former municipality
- Flag Coat of arms

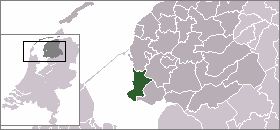
- Coordinates: 52°59′N 5°26′E
- Country: Netherlands
- Province: Friesland
- Municipality: Súdwest-Fryslân

Area (2006)
  - Total: 289.17 km^{2} (111.65 sq mi)
  - Land: 96.68 km^{2} (37.33 sq mi)
  - Water: 192.49 km^{2} (74.32 sq mi)

Population (1 January, 2007)
  - Total: 10,887
  - Density: 113/km^{2} (290/sq mi)
- Source: CBS, Statline.
- Time zone: UTC+1 (CET)
  - Summer (DST): UTC+2 (CEST)

Nijefurd (Dutch pronunciation: [ˈnɛiəfʏrt], West Frisian: [ˈnɛiəføt]) is a former municipality in the northern Netherlands, in the province of Friesland.

== History ==
It was formed in 1984 from the old municipalities of Hindeloopen, Stavoren, and Workum, and part of Hemelumer Oldeferd.

In 2011, it formed together with the municipalities of Bolsward, Sneek, Wûnseradiel and Wymbritseradiel the new municipality Súdwest Fryslân.

== Population centres ==
- Hemelum
- Hindeloopen
- It Heidenskip
- Koudum
- Molkwerum
- Nijhuizum
- Stavoren
- Warns
- Workum.
