= Stephen K. Scher =

American art historian

Stephen K. Scher is an American art historian and the former chairman of the art department at Brown University. He is a leading collector of portrait medals and in 2016 announced the gift of his collection to the Frick Collection.

Scher grew up in New York City, and obtained a B.A. from Yale University in 1956, a M.A. from the New York University Institute of Fine Arts in 1961, and a Ph.D. in art history from Yale in 1966. After obtaining his Ph.D., he taught art history at Brown University, becoming the chairman of the art department from 1972–1973. Among his students at Brown was Ian Wardropper, who would become the director of the Frick Collection.

During his time at the Institute of Fine Arts, Scher developed an interest in collecting portrait medals. The Yale Center for British Art described his Renaissance portrait medal collection as "possibly the largest and finest collection in the world."
