= Hemelum =

Hemelum Himmelum
- Village
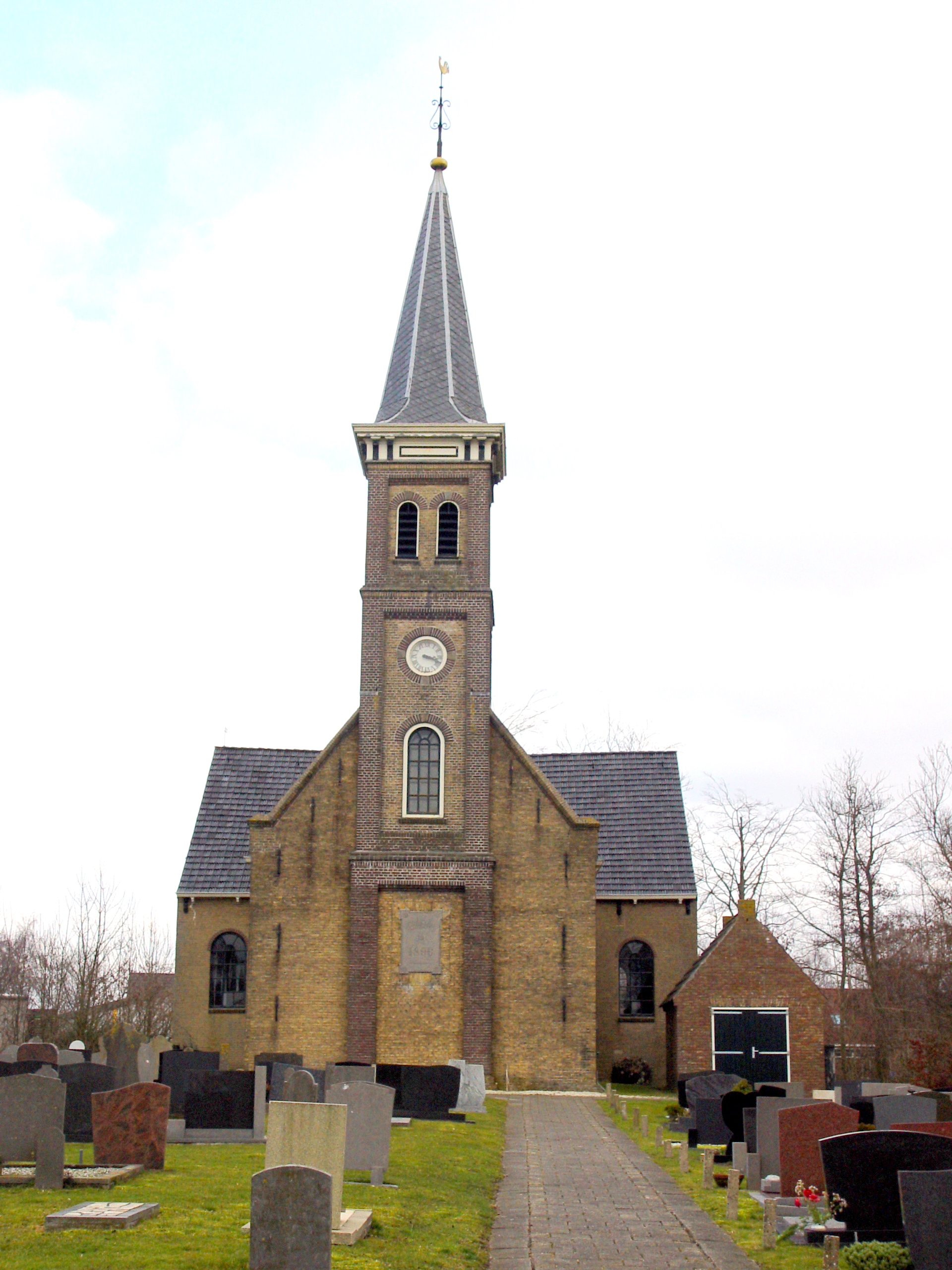
- Saint-Nicolas Church

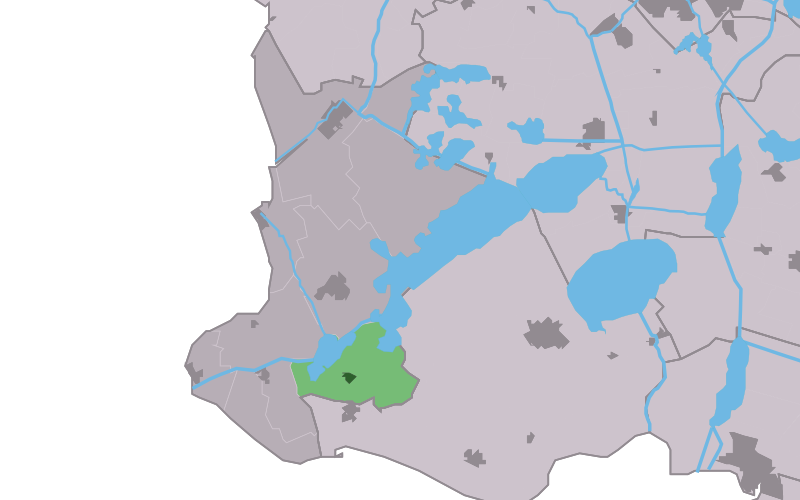
- Location in the former Nijefurd municipality

- Location in the Netherlands Hemelum (Netherlands)
- Country: Netherlands
- Province: Friesland
- Municipality: Súdwest-Fryslân

Population (2017)
  - Total: 610
- Time zone: UTC+1 (CET)
  - Summer (DST): UTC+2 (CEST)
- Postal code: 8584
- Dialing code: 0514
- Website: Official

Hemelum (West Frisian: Himmelum [ˈhɪmələm]) is a village in Súdwest Fryslân municipality, in the province Friesland of the Netherlands. It had a population of around 610 in January 2017.

== History ==
The earliest records of Hemelum date back to 1180. The noble families of Epema and Galama lived in the town in the Middle Ages. Early Hemelum was home to a stins, some estates, and a convent. The nunnery of the Benedictine Order was one of the first convents to be established in Friesland, and was dependent on the Abbot of Stavorum. The lay order of the Beguines and Beghards was also active at the convent for a time. The Dutch Reformed Church of Hemelum was built in 1668 on the foundations of the old convent, as the religious turmoil of the Reformation had largely displaced monasticism in the Dutch Republic. However, Christian monasticism experienced a modest revival in Hemelum toward the end of the 20th century with the establishment of a Russian Orthodox convent in the village.

For centuries, most people living in and around Hemelum were farmers. In 1896, farmers in Hemelum founded the steam-powered dairy factory Coöperatieve Stoomzuivelfabriek Hemelum, which soon became an important source of employment for the village. Since 1974, the building has been used as a water sports company (including a sailing school). Recently, tourism companies have begun to take up residence in the town.

Until the municipal consolidation in 1984, Hemelum was located in the municipality of Hemelumer Oldeferd, with the municipal capital in Koudum. From 1984 to 2011, Hemelum was part of the municipality of Nijefurd, with the capital in Workum.

== Community ==
=== Population ===
- 1954 - 728
- 1959 - 644
- 1964 - 620
- 1969 - 557
- 1973 - 532
- 2001 - 585
