= Warren Farm, Southall =

Location in London, England

Warren Farm
- Location within London Borough of Ealing
- Type: Metropolitan Open Land
- Location: Southall, United Kingdom
- Coordinates: 51°30′01″N 0°20′41″W
- Area: 61 acres (25 ha)

Warren Farm is a 61-acre (25 hectare) plot of Metropolitan Open Land and Local Nature Reserve located in Norwood Green (Southall) that was previously used as playing fields by local schools. The site also has disused changing rooms and pavilions. After falling out of use as playing fields, it is now a wildflower meadow.

Warren Farm was designated as a Local Nature Reserve by Ealing Council on 9 March 2026.

== History ==
As the name suggests, Warren Farm was initially a farm. It was part of the Osterley Park estate and was acquired by the London County Council from the Countess of Jersey in April 1925. It was run as a farm until the 1960s, when it was converted for use as a sports ground. Control was handed over to Ealing Council in 1990.

In October 2017 wheelie bins stored at Warren Farm caught fire leading to a response of 10 fire engines as well as "70 firefighters and officers."

== Wildlife ==
The site has many plant and animal species; most notably skylarks. Bats, barn owls and 15 locally important plant species are also present on the site.

== Queens Park Rangers ==
Queens Park Rangers F.C. (QPR) announced that Warren Farm was their desired site for a new first team training facility. They proposed to build a two-storey training centre and a three-storey operations building, as well as other buildings. In addition, they planned to build 11 football pitches and "3 cricket wickets" as well as over 400 car parking spaces. Ealing Council granted them planning permission. Legal challenges were issued by local residents, but the final appeal was rejected by the Supreme Court. However nearly 10 years after first announcing their intention, QPR stated they no longer preferred Warren Farm for their training ground, instead moving to a site in Heston.

== Campaign for Nature Reserve status ==
While QPR pursued their plans, Warren Farm was re-wilding naturally. The Brent River and Canal Society, together with local residents opposed to development plans, proposed and petitioned for the area to gain Local nature reserve status; their campaign gained over 3,000 signatures in the first week. The petition stood at 20,000 signatures by March 2023.

A consultation was opened in 2022 which was welcomed by Southall F.C., who had identified the site as suitable for their club.

The publication of the consultation results led to varying claims: proponents of nature reserve status suggested that majority view was in favour, whilst the council stated that the respondents to the survey were not representative of the local area.

In January 2023 Ealing Council announced their intention to develop just over half of Warren Farm as a sports facility whilst also saying they would continue to provide land for the wildlife. They said, “We want to develop plans for this space for people both to enjoy nature and preserve its wild character and provide sports facilities for local people.”

At a meeting on 21 February 2023 the council approved the plans for sport facilities on the site. This attracted a protest in front of Ealing Town Hall with reports of numbers of protesters varying from 250 to 2000 (with local news sources indicating that the likely figure was nearer to the lower end).

Before the council meeting, in a video produced by the Ealing Wildlife Group, a number of prominent wildlife experts and presenters expressed their opposition to Ealing Council's plans and support for the Local Nature Reserve campaign.

in June 2023 a Freedom of Information request by Ealing Council's opposition leader Gary Malcolm revealed that a report in 2018 for Ealing Council recommended that Warren Farm be designated a Site of Importance for Nature Conservation (SINC). The report by ecology consultants was based on a survey carried out in 2017 but was not published.

On 27 February 2024, Ealing Council announced its intention to designate all of Warren Farm as a Local Nature Reserve. This decision was passed by Ealing Council's Cabinet on 6 March 2024.

On 9 March 2026, Ealing Council announced that Warren Farm had been designated as a Local Nature Reserve.
