= Molkwerum =

Molkwerum Molkwar
- Village
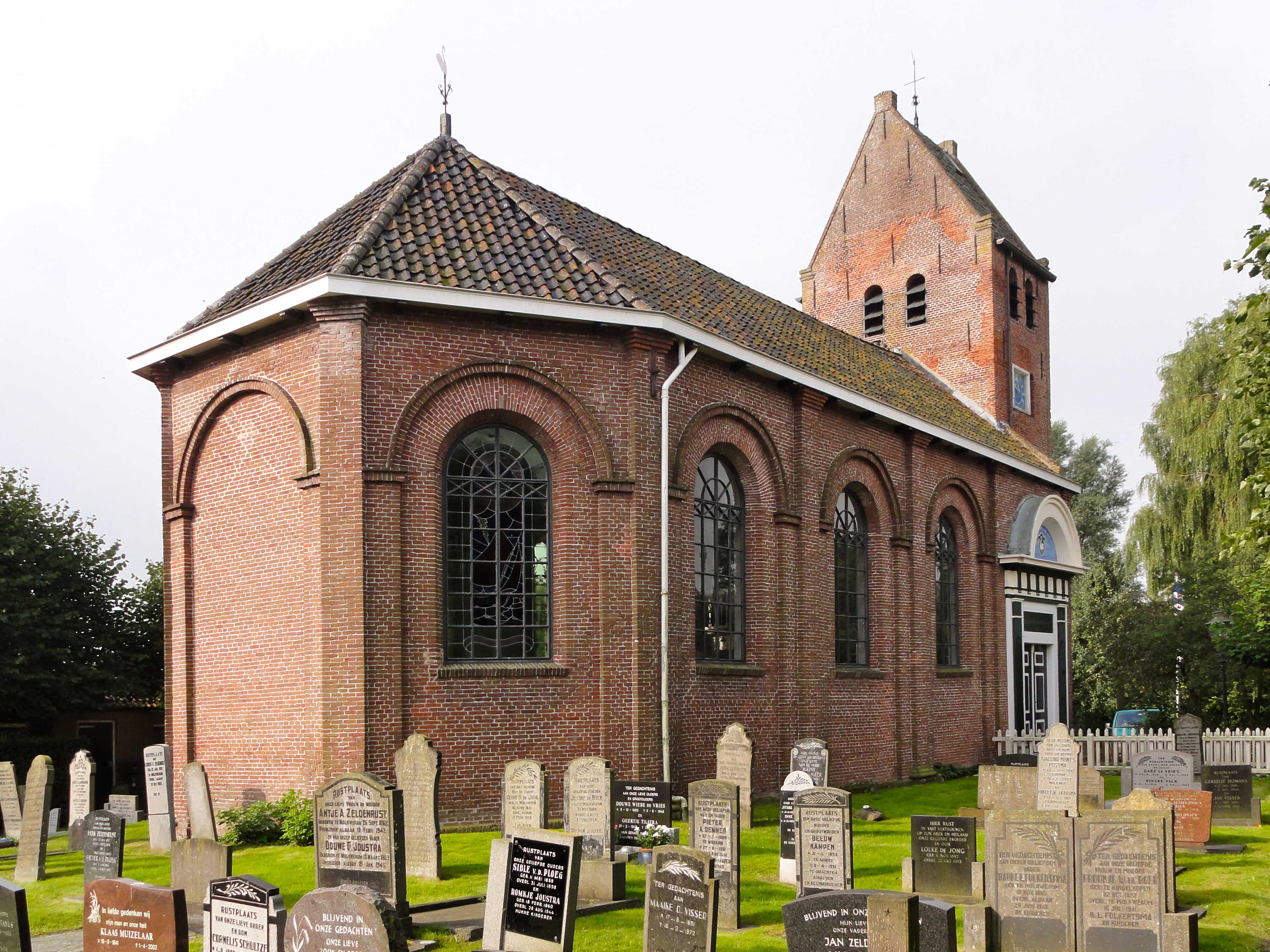
- St Lebuinus Church

- Coat of arms

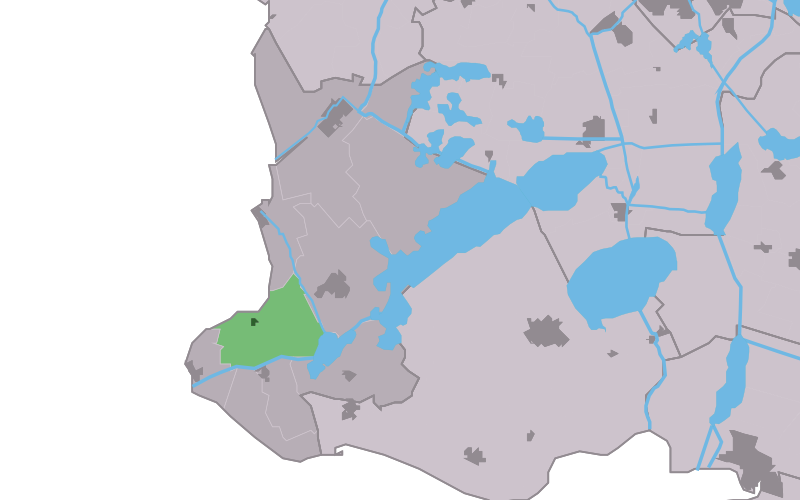
- Location in the former Nijefurd municipality

- Location in the Netherlands Molkwerum (Netherlands)
- Country: Netherlands
- Province: Friesland
- Municipality: Súdwest-Fryslân

Area
  - Total: 10.72 km^{2} (4.14 sq mi)
- Elevation: −0.1 m (−0.33 ft)

Population (2021)
  - Total: 360
  - Density: 34/km^{2} (87/sq mi)
- Time zone: UTC+1 (CET)
  - Summer (DST): UTC+2 (CEST)
- Postal code: 8722
- Dialing code: 0514

Molkwerum (West Frisian: Molkwar [ˈmɔlkʋar]) is a village in Súdwest-Fryslân municipality in the province of Friesland, the Netherlands. It had a population of around 390 in January 2017. Molkwerum used to be called Friese Doolhof (Frisian Maze), because it is built on numerous little islands dissected by canals in a random fashion. The village used to contain 27 bridges.

== History ==
The village was first mentioned in 1398 as Molkenhuzen. The etymology is unclear. Molkwerum used to be located to the north of the former Zuiderzee and to the south of the former Staverse Meer which was poldered in the 17th century. The village was populated by sea traders who sailed to the Baltic Sea, and had its own office in Amsterdam.

The current Dutch Reformed church was built in 1850 and has a tower from 1799. The maritime past lasted until the 16th/17th century, and Molkwerum turned into a fishing village.

Molkwerum was home to 301 people in 1840. In 1885, a shared Koudum-Molkwerum railway station with Koudum opened. In the 1960s, the harbour was filled up, and the sluice was demolished. In 2000, an Elvis Presley museum opened in the village, and contains authentic clothes worn by the King and an autographed guitar. Before 2011, the village was part of the Nijefurd municipality and before 1984 it belonged to Hemelumer Oldeferd municipality.

== Gallery ==
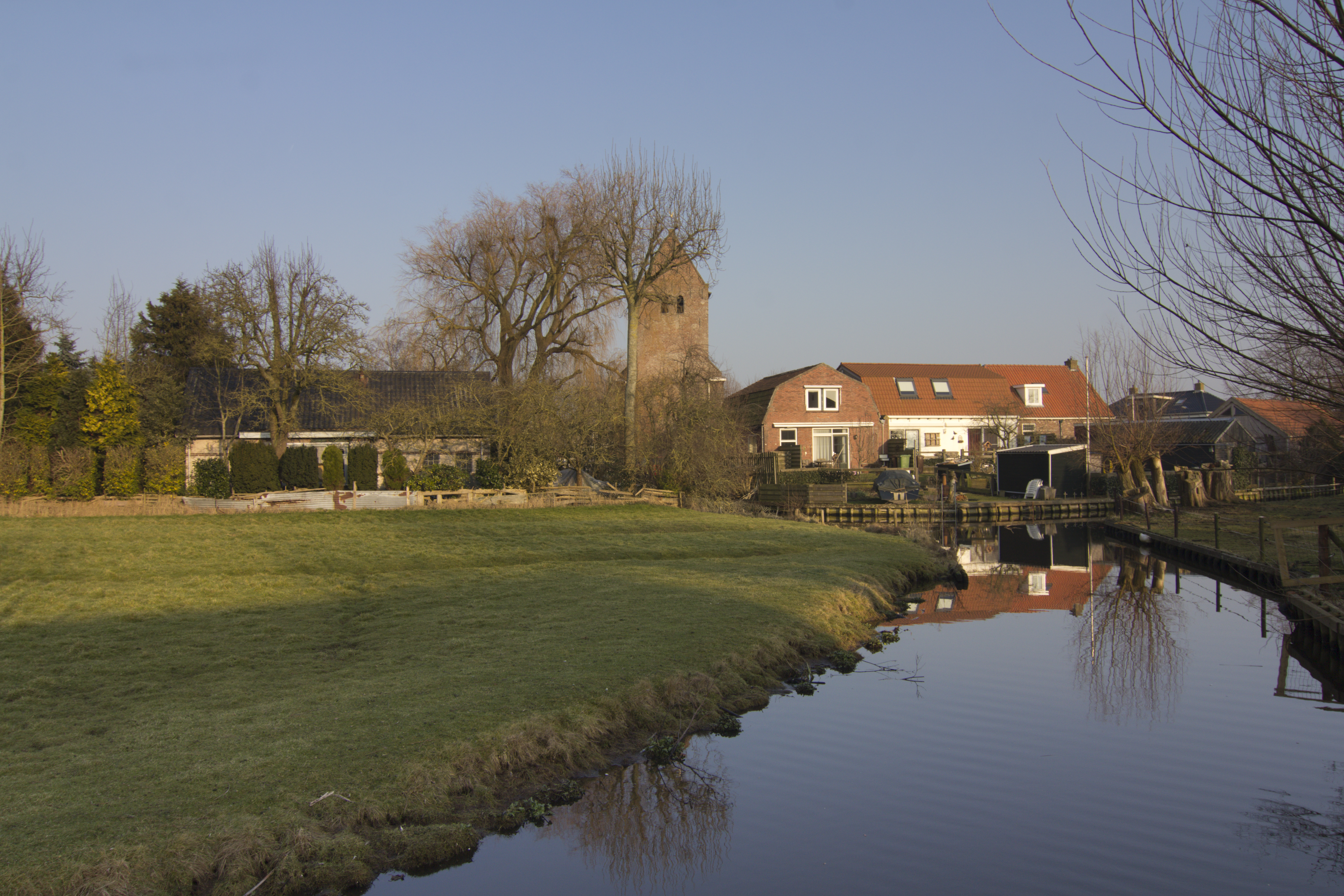
View on Molkwerum

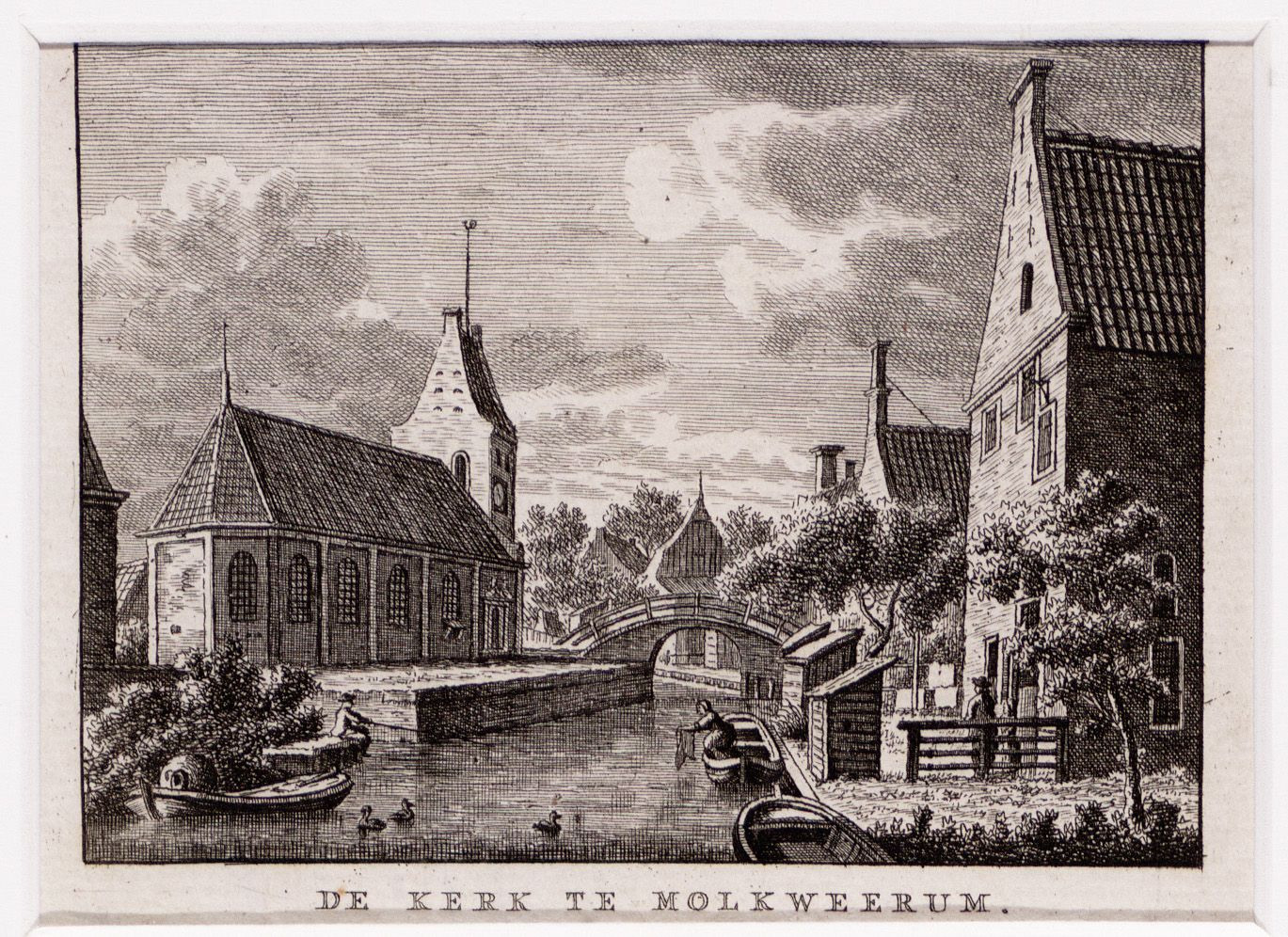
Drawing of Molkwerum (1790)

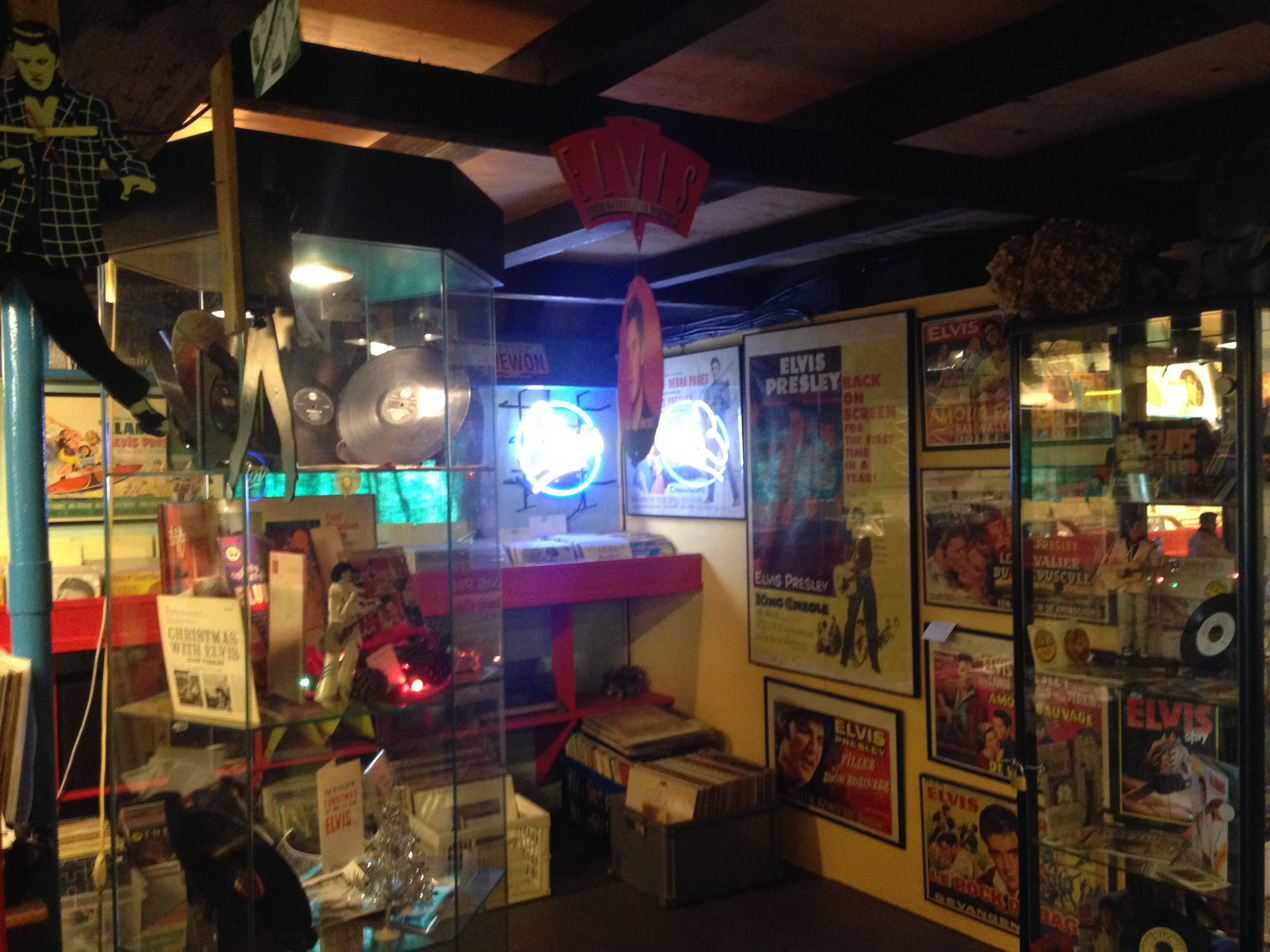
Elvis Presley museum

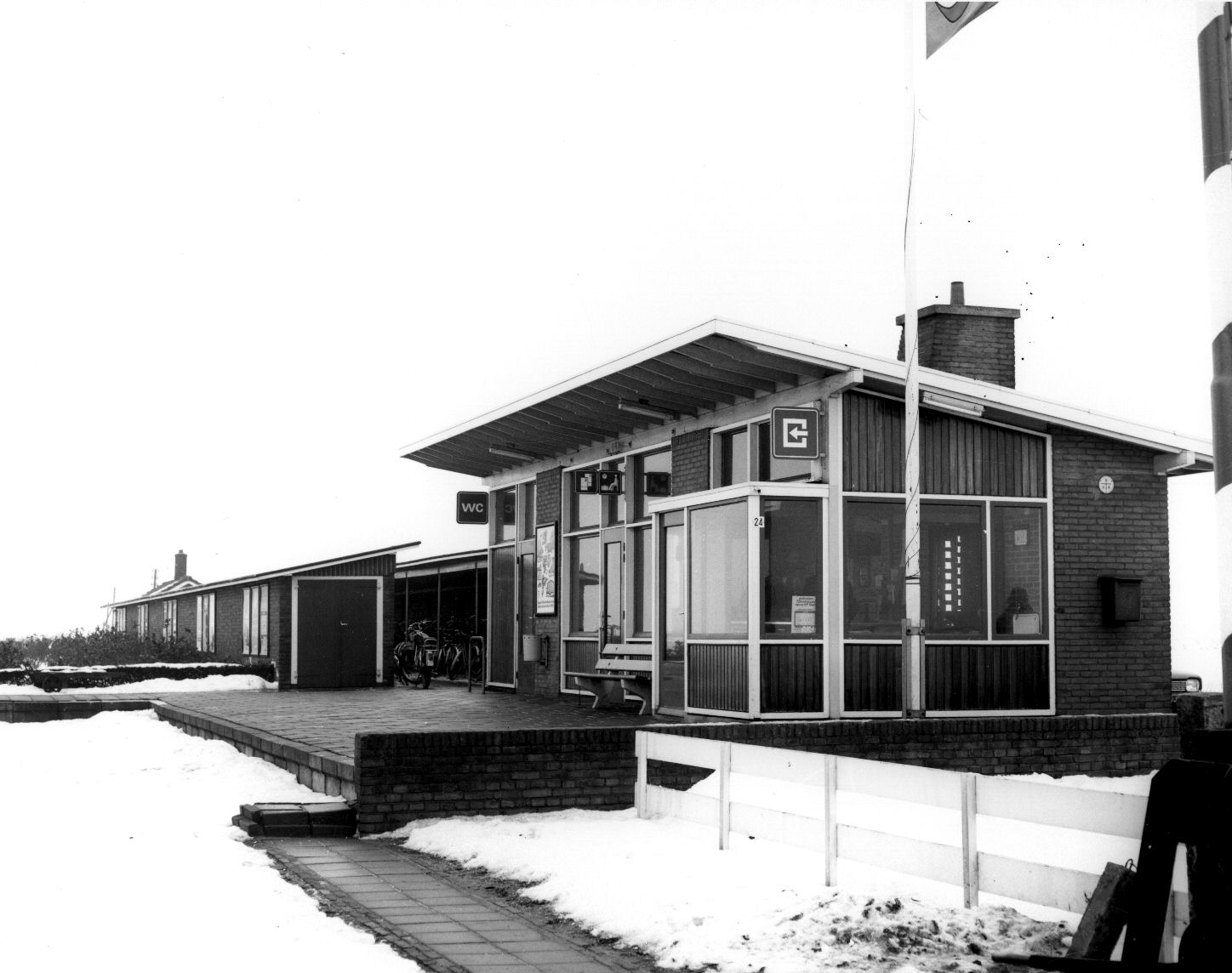
Koudum-Molkwerum railway station
