= Engage (visual arts) =

Engage, the National Association for Gallery Education, is an educational charity in the United Kingdom. It aims to promote visual arts through gallery education, and describes itself as "the lead advocacy and training network for visual arts engagement and participation". It was founded by Colin Grigg in 1989 as the National Association for Gallery Education when he was working at the Arts Council.

The organisation runs the Marsh Award for Excellence in Visual Arts Engagement. It has been recommended as a resource for art teachers. It publishes a journal, engage, and has run seminars.

In 2019 its activities included a conference on health and wellbeing, a creative writing and literacy programme, work on dementia-friendly galleries, professional development activities for people working in the arts, and support for research into arts education.

It has representation on the All-party parliamentary group on Art, Craft and Design Education.

In 2019 the organisation's income came from the Arts Council England, the Arts Council of Wales, Creative Scotland and the Max Reinhardt Charitable Trust.
