= Sovon =

Dutch data management organization for ornithology

Sovon (official name: Sovon Vogelonderzoek Nederland; English name Sovon Dutch Centre for Field Ornithology) is the national data management organisation for ornithology in the Netherlands. It coordinates bird monitoring and research at a national level according to standardised scientific criteria, and encourages the participation of as many volunteers as possible in bird monitoring. The association is headquartered in Nijmegen.

== History ==
Sovon was founded in 1973 by three biologists who were at the time involved in research on birds (Luit Buurma, Jan Wattel and Herman Klomp), with the name Stichting Ornithologisch Veldonderzoek Nederland (SOVON). It was modelled on the British example of the British Trust for Ornithology (BTO) which was founded with similar objectives forty years earlier. The first major SOVON project was the (first) Dutch Breeding Bird Atlas, which was published in 1979.

In 1984 the SOVON foundation became an association, at first as Samenwerkende Organisaties Vogelonderzoek Nederland, but eventually the exact meaning of the acronym SOVON was abandoned. The official name of the association is Sovon Vogelonderzoek Nederland (Sovon Bird Research Netherlands).

The most recent Dutch Breeding Bird Atlas (Vogelatlas van Nederland) was published by Sovon in 2019, in cooperation with partner organisations including Vogelbescherming Nederland.

Sovon publishes the magazine Limosa, jointly with the Nederlandse Ornithologische Unie.
