= Marsh Charitable Trust =

Charity in the United Kingdom

Marsh Charitable Trust, also known as Marsh Christian Trust, is a national charity in the United Kingdom, based in London. It is a registered charity under English law, and was established in 1981 by Brian Marsh, the current Chairman. Marsh was appointed an OBE for services to business and charity in the 2005 New Year Honours.

The trust specialises in providing small annual grants to charities across a wide range of charitable activities to pay for running costs. It also runs the Marsh Awards, a group of over 100 awards given annually by the Trust in partnership with around 40 different organisations, intended to reward the work of volunteers and charity workers. The number of awards continues to grow, and awards are given in the areas of conservation, science, the arts, heritage, literature, social welfare and volunteering.

The Marsh Christian Trust changed its public facing name to the Marsh Charitable Trust on 1st September 2021.

== Awards ==
The Marsh Awards are the creation of Brian Marsh, who wanted to support areas such as conservation and volunteering but wished to identify a way of ensuring a modest sum of money made an impact. The awards programme works alongside a number of partner organisations. These partners recommend a shortlist of worthy award winners, but the final decision lies with a judging panel, ensuring independence.

=== Social welfare awards ===
This category of awards recognises individuals and groups who through their volunteering, fundraising and general ongoing support have improved the quality of many people's lives across the UK. The winners of these awards have worked with children, campaigned for human rights and supported carers, refugees, victims of human trafficking and many others.

Partner organisations in this category are:

- Barnardo's: one of the UK's leading children's charities, working to transform the lives of vulnerable children.
- Human Trafficking Foundation: works to provide a collective voice for the many charities and agencies operating to combat human trafficking.
- Mind: one of the UK's leading charities working to improve the lives of people with experience of mental health problems.
- Prison Advice and Care Trust (PACT): a national charity that provides support to prisoners, people with convictions, and their families.
- Re-engage: dedicated to tackling loneliness and social isolation amongst older people through face-to-face contact.
- Refugee Council: one of the leading charities in the UK working directly with refugees and supporting them to rebuild their lives.
- St Mungo's: a housing association aiming to end homelessness and help people rebuild their lives.
- We Are With You: supports adults, children, young adults and older people make positive behavioural changes to change their lives for the better, particularly through recovery from addiction.
- Wilton Park: an international forum for strategic discussion, initiating discussions on issues of international security, prosperity and justice.

=== Conservation and ecology awards ===
This group of awards recognises individuals, groups and young people for their volunteering, academic study and lifetime contributions to the conservation of the planet. Their activities tend to range from local conservation, collecting data and recording wildlife to ways of managing climate change, community based international conservation projects and the protection of genetic biodiversity.

Partner organisations in this category are:

- Botanic Gardens Conservation International (BGCI): the world authority on botanic gardens and plant conservation and the only global organisation devoted to conserving the world's plant diversity.
- British Ecological Society: promotes the science of ecology through research, publications and conferences and uses the findings of research to educate the public and to influence policy.
- British Entomological and Natural History Society (BENHS): promotes advancement of research in entomology with an increasing emphasis on the conservation of fauna and flora and the protection of wildlife through the world.
- British Trust for Ornithology (BTO): works to investigate, promote and protect primarily birds, but also other wildlife, by monitoring change in their populations and behaviours. Collaborates on the five Marsh Awards for Ornithology.
- Butterfly Conservation: a leading voice in working to stop the decline of butterflies and moths in the UK to maintain a world full of butterflies for future generations to enjoy.
- Canal and River Trust: cares for waterways in England and Wales and promotes their importance for local communities, our heritage and the environment.
- Fauna and Flora International (FFI): works in partnership with numerous smaller organisations all over the world facilitating and initiating sustainable biodiversity.
- Kent Wildlife Trust: the leading conservation organisation covering the whole of Kent and Medway, dedicated to protecting wildlife and wild habitats for everyone to enjoy.
- The Marjan Centre for the Study of Conflict and Conservation: seeks to protect the planet's biodiversity by understanding the relationship between conflict and conservation.
- Rare Breeds Survival Trust (RBST): works to conserve Britain's native livestock heritage.
- Royal Botanic Gardens, Kew (RBGK): a leader in plant science and conservation.
- Royal Horticultural Society (RHS): the UK's leading gardening charity.
- The Wildlife Trusts: help to reduce the decline of nature by protecting the UK's natural and wild places, through work in both marine and terrestrial environments.
- Wildfowl and Wetlands Trust (WWT): the UK's leading voice in Wetland Conservation since 1946.
- Zoological Society of London (ZSL): works to promote and ensure the worldwide conservation of animals.

=== Arts and culture awards ===
This group of awards recognises individuals and groups for their efforts in the protection, promotion and appreciation of art and culture throughout society. The award winners are volunteers and professionals conducting a range of activities, from working in education in museums and galleries and helping to keep them open to the public, to artists creating new pieces of art and conservationists protecting existing ones.

Partner organisations in this category are:

- The Arts Society: a leading arts education charity with a global network of 385 local Societies which bring people together through shared curiosity for the arts.
- British Art Medal Society (BAMS): an organisation that brings together artists, historians, collectors and dealers in its appreciation and preservation of the medal as a traditional form of art.
- British Museum: a leader in the museum world, dedicated to human history, art and culture.
- Engage: the lead advocacy and training network for gallery education, bringing communities together through opportunities to learn and benefit from art.
- Museum of London: tells the story of London with the help of hundreds of volunteers who contribute their time, skills and interests in various ways.
- Public Statues and Sculpture Association (PSSA): aims to heighten public appreciation of Britain's public sculptures and fountains, and to contribute to their preservation, protection, and promotion.
- The Royal Opera House (ROH): an opera house and a major performing arts venue.

=== Heritage and community ===
This group of awards recognises individuals and groups for their efforts in building and protecting local communities and local national heritage. The winners of these awards are volunteers, historians, historical scientists, and crafts people who work to protect the UK's national heritage and build and uphold local communities and social networks.

The partner organisations in this category are:

- Churches Conservation Trust (CCT): works to put historic English churches back at the heart of the community by conserving their past and regenerating the buildings for the future.
- Council for British Archaeology (CBA): an educational charity working throughout the UK to promote and involve people in archaeology.
- Heritage Crafts Association: the UK's leading organisation fighting against the loss of the nation's traditional crafts.
- Institute of Historic Building Conservation (IHBC): the principal professional body for building conservation practitioners and historic environment specialists.
- National Churches Trust: dedicated to promoting and supporting church buildings of historic, architectural and community value.
- National Historic Ships UK: the official voice for historic vessels in the UK, helping to manage the upkeep and keep a record of all the historic vessels in the UK.
- Natural History Museum: a world-class visitor attraction and a leading science research centre.
- Royal Anthropological Institute (RAI): the world's longest-established scholarly association dedicated to the furtherance of anthropology.
- Royal Museums Greenwich: is home to the Royal Observatory, the iconic historic sailing ship Cutty Sark, the National Maritime Museum and the Queen's House art gallery.
