= Scharl =

Scharl may refer to:

- Scharl, Netherlands, a village in the Netherlands
- S-charl, a village in Switzerland
