= Scharl, Netherlands =

Scharl Skarl
- Village
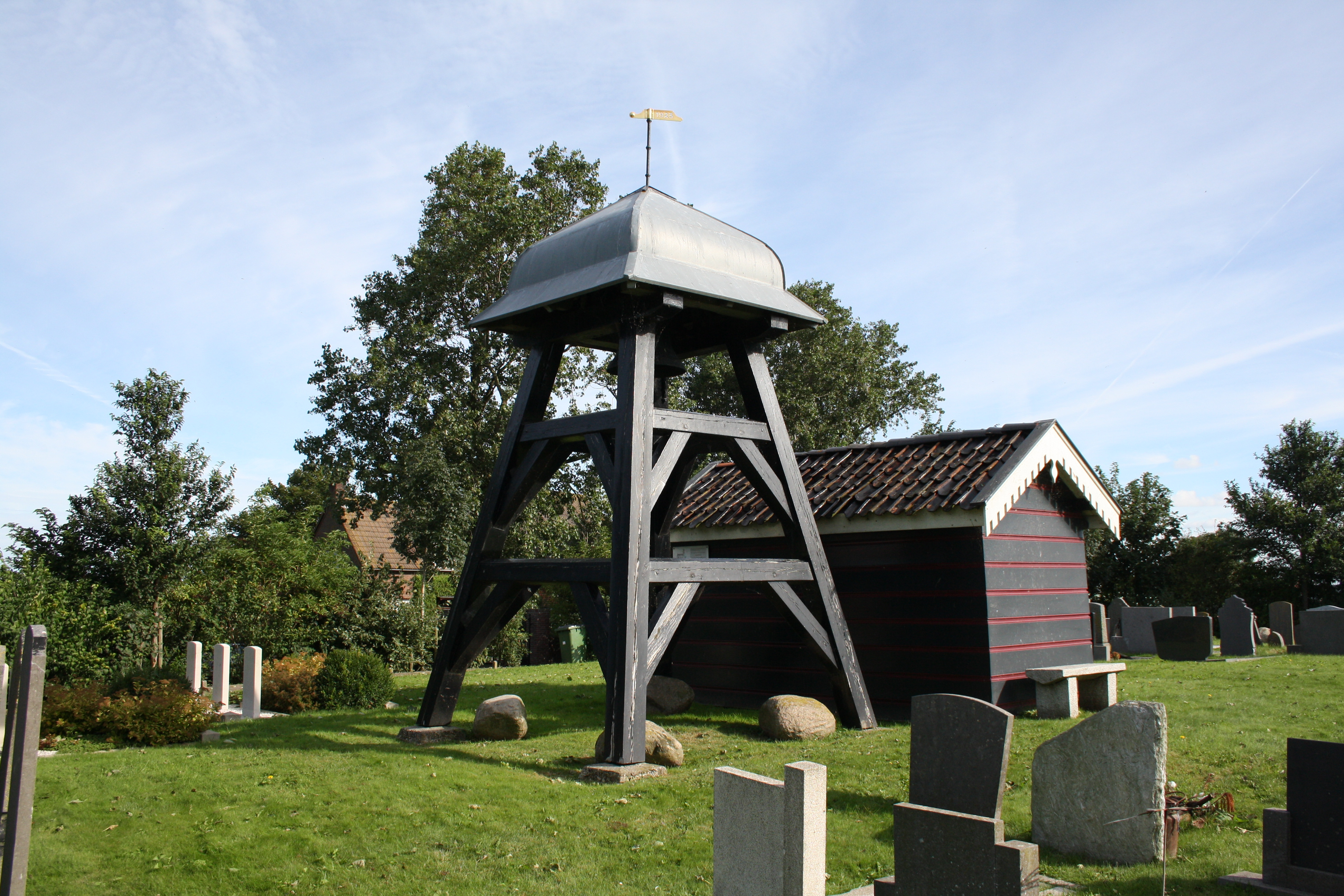
- Scharl Bellfray

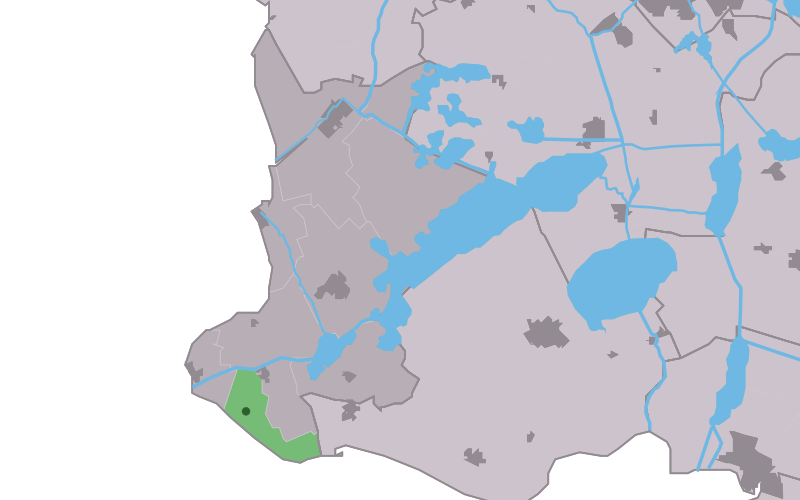
- Location in the former Nijefurd municipality

- Location in the Netherlands Scharl (Netherlands)
- Country: Netherlands
- Province: Friesland
- Municipality: Súdwest-Fryslân

Area
  - Total: 6.16 km^{2} (2.38 sq mi)
- Elevation: 0.4 m (1.3 ft)

Population (2021)
  - Total: 60
  - Density: 9.7/km^{2} (25/sq mi)
- Time zone: UTC+1 (CET)
  - Summer (DST): UTC+2 (CEST)
- Postal code: 8721
- Dialing code: 0514

Scharl is a small village in Súdwest-Fryslân municipality in the province of Friesland, the Netherlands. It had a population of around 55 in January 2017.

== History ==
The village was first mentioned in 1412 as Scarle. The etymology is unclear. The village is located near the Roode Klif (Red Cliff), a nine metre high clay ridge, on the former Zuiderzee (nowadays: IJsselmeer) where the Battle of Warns took place in 1345 and William IV of Holland was defeated by Friesland. Almost the entire army of Holland including count William were killed during the battle.

The church of the village has been demolished in 1732, and only a bell tower remains. The current bell tower dates from 1898. Scharl was home to 48 people in 1840. Before 2011, the village was part of the Nijefurd municipality and before 1984 it belonged to Hemelumer Oldeferd municipality.

== Gallery ==
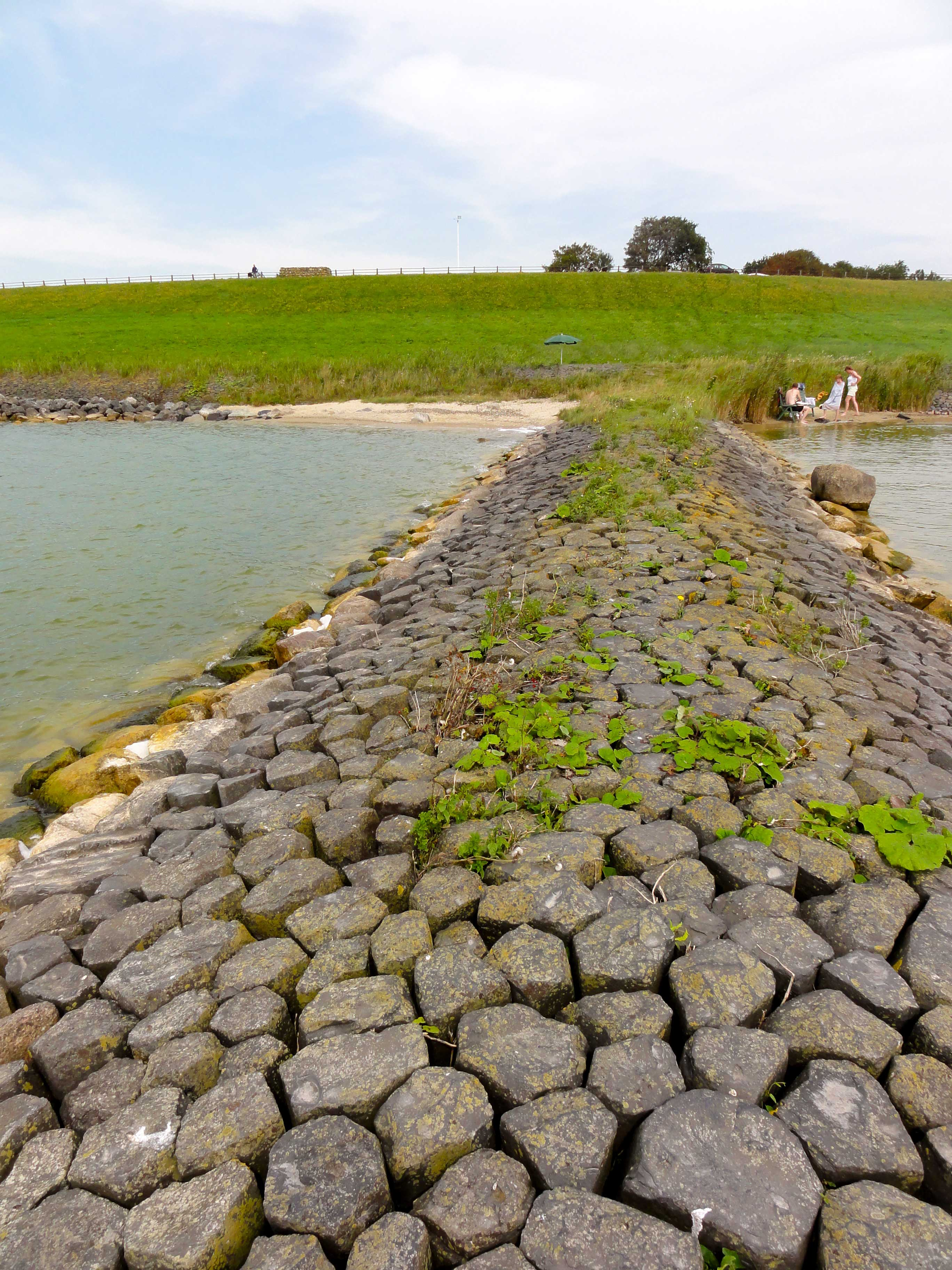
The Roode Klif

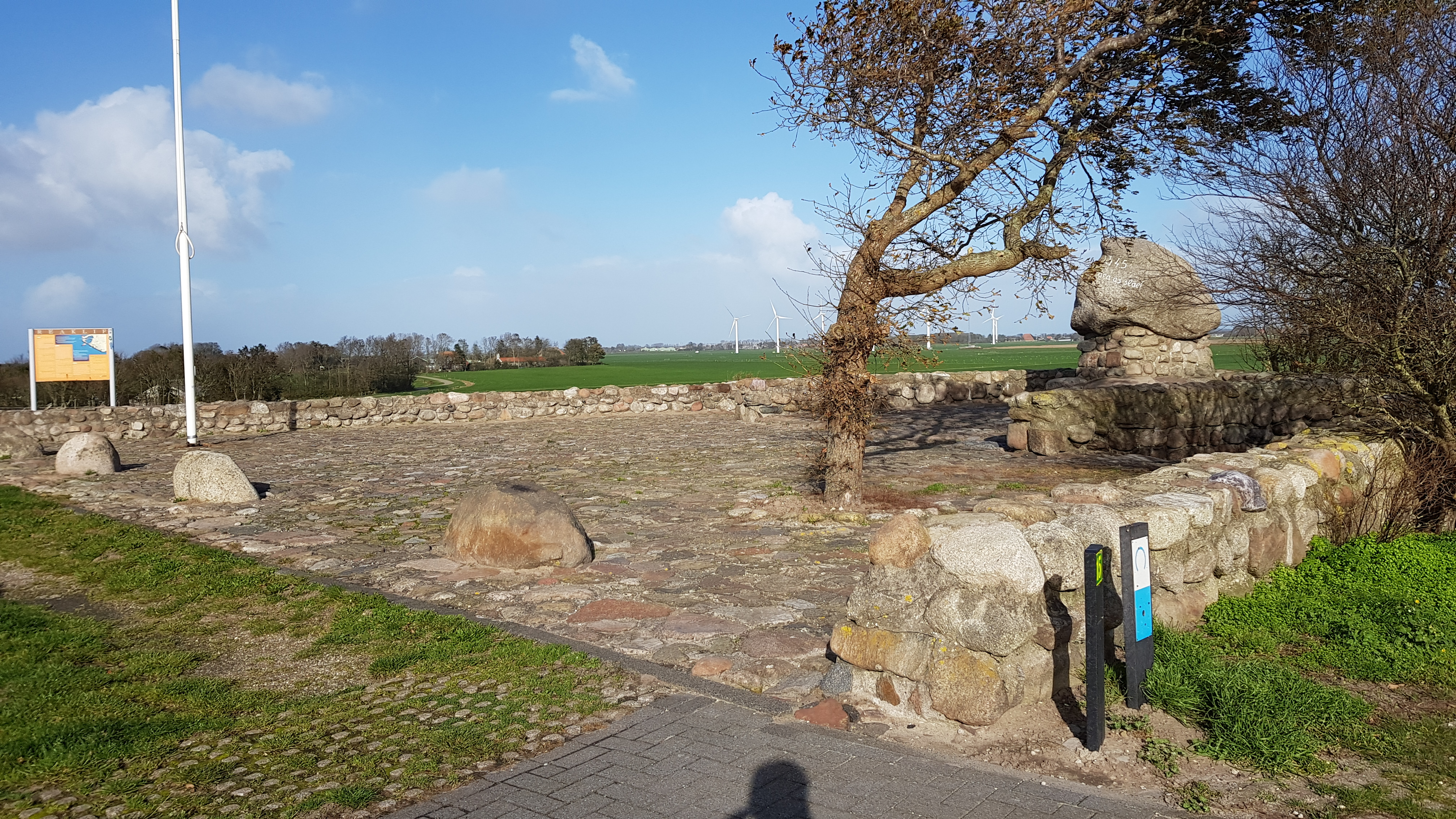
Monument celebrating the victory of Friesland over Holland
