= Exmorra =

Exmorra Eksmoarre
- Village
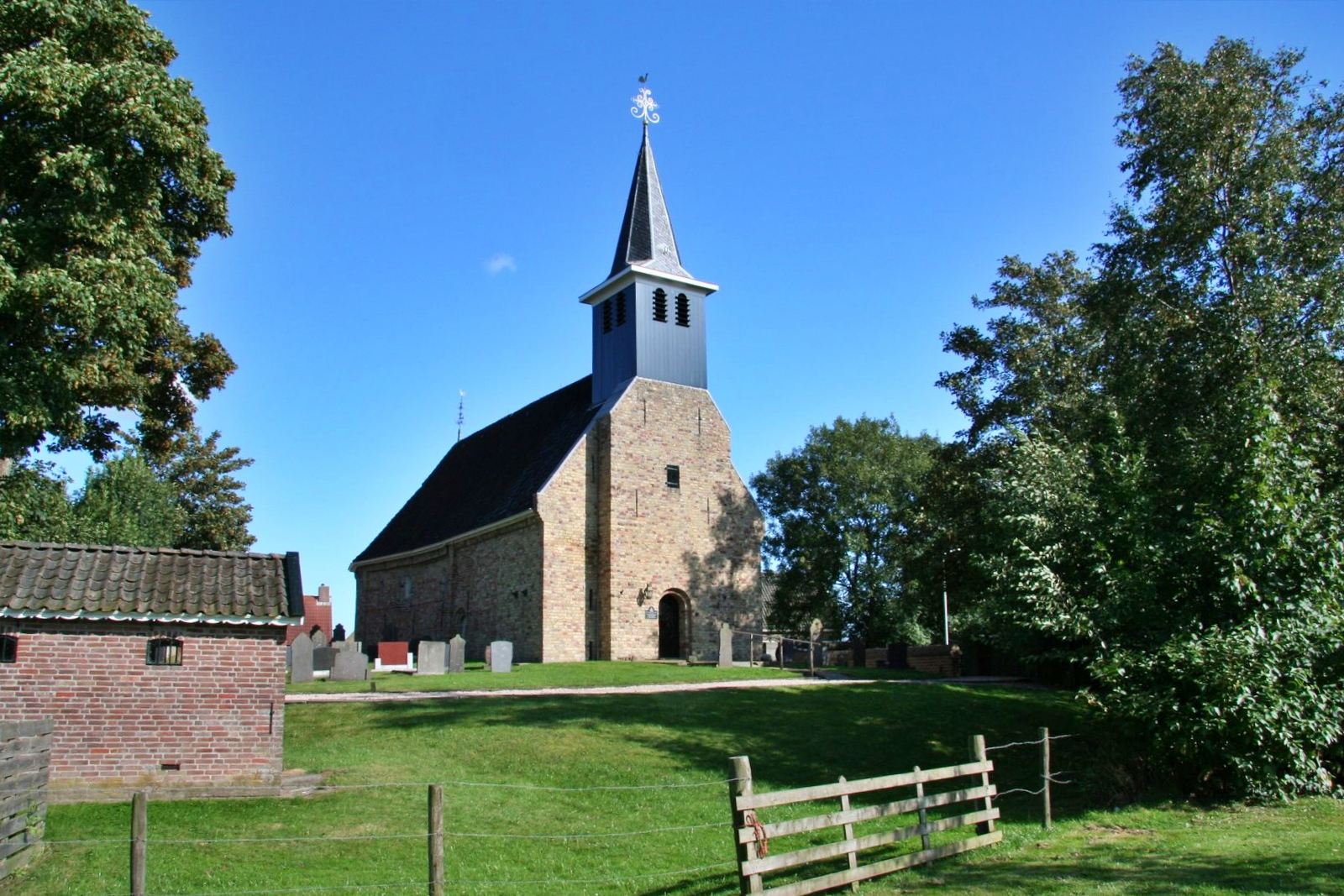
- St John the Baptist church

- Flag Coat of arms

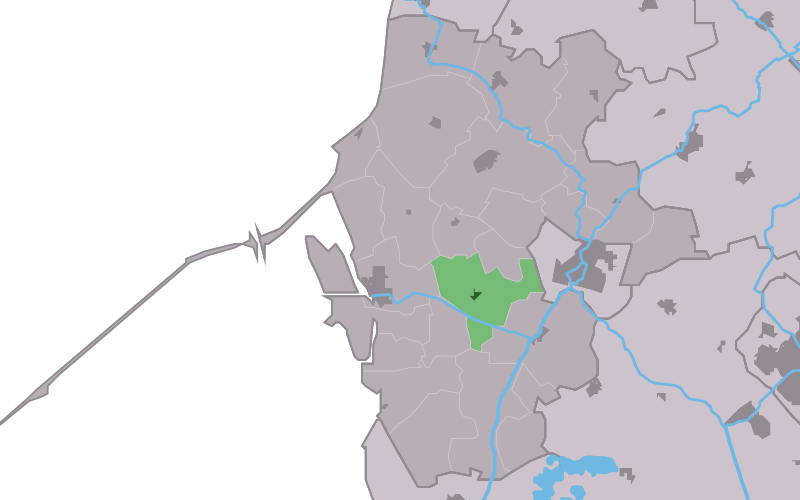
- Location in the former Wûnseradiel municipality

- Location in the Netherlands Exmorra (Netherlands)
- Country: Netherlands
- Province: Friesland
- Municipality: Súdwest-Fryslân

Area
  - Total: 8.06 km^{2} (3.11 sq mi)
- Elevation: −0.1 m (−0.33 ft)

Population (2021)
  - Total: 485
  - Density: 60.2/km^{2} (156/sq mi)
- Time zone: UTC+1 (CET)
  - Summer (DST): UTC+2 (CEST)
- Postal code: 8615
- Dialing code: 0515

Exmorra (West Frisian: Eksmoarre) is a village in Súdwest-Fryslân in the province of Friesland, the Netherlands. It had a population of around 470 in January 2017.

== History ==
The village was first mentioned in 855 as Aspanmora. The etymology is unclear. Exmorra is a terp (artificial mount village) from the middle ages. The village used to be surrounded by lake and the economy was partially based on fishing. With the poldering of the lakes, it turned into an agricultural community.

The Dutch Reformed Church was built in the 13th century from yellow and red bricks. The tower collapsed in 1836 in a storm and was rebuilt. The church was extensively restored between 1963 and 1966.

Exmorra was home to 168 people in 1840.

Before 2011, the village was part of the Wûnseradiel municipality.

== Overview ==
The village has a Christian primary school. Every year there is a village festival in August, for which many different activities are being organized. There are several neighbourhood associations who organize these activities. Some years, a themed parade takes place. Exmorra has a monthly paper for the residents of Exmorra and Allingawier.

A few companies are located in Exmorra, among others a shop of an artist who makes glass sculptures by hand. In winter there is a skating rink. There is a large sports field where kaats (Frisian handball) tournaments are being held. Kaatsen is a popular Frisian sport.

There is a monument to a crashed Lockheed Hudson. The Royal Air Force plane crashed in the IJsselmeer on 6 July 1944.

== Gallery ==
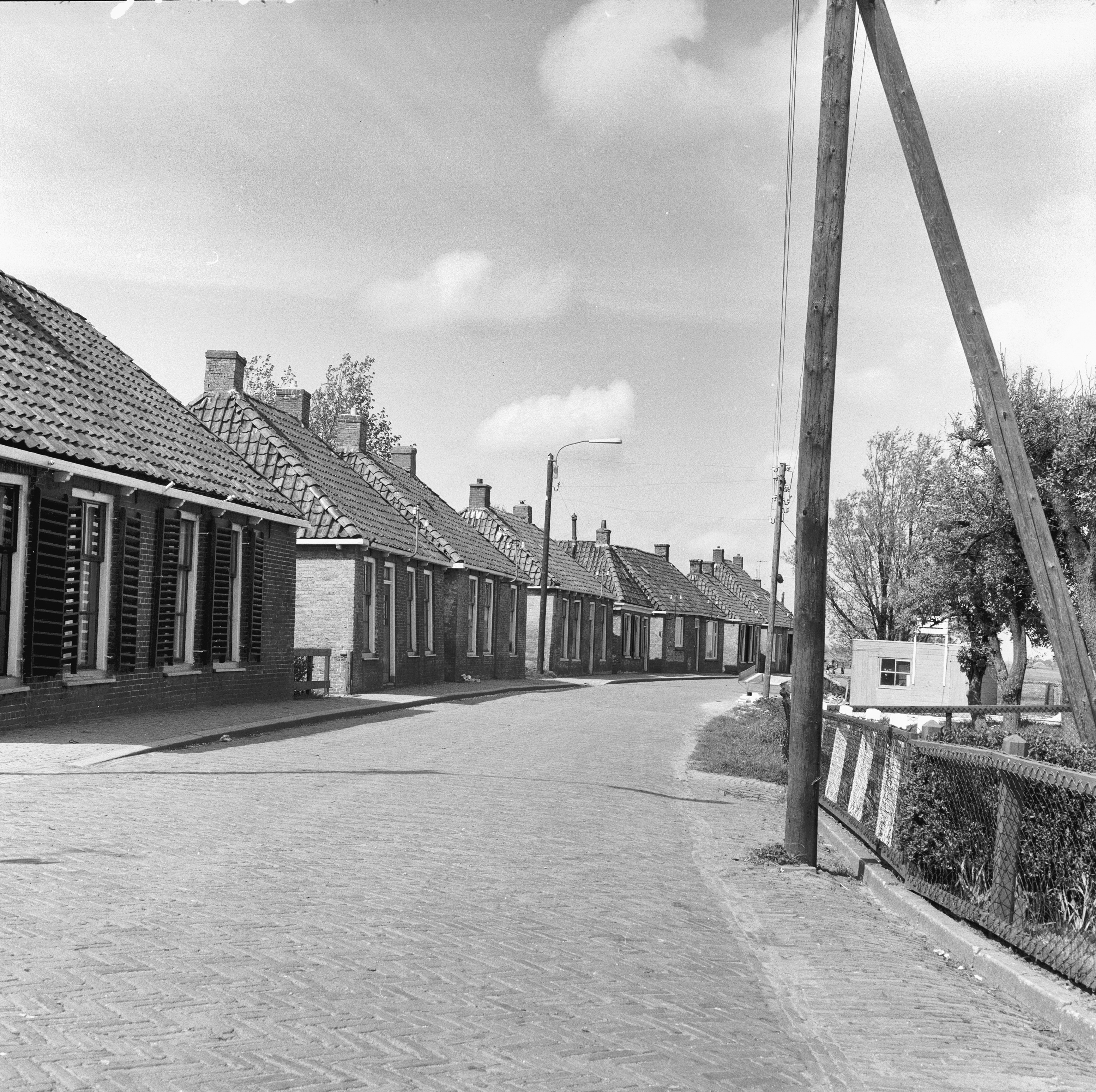
Street view (1964)

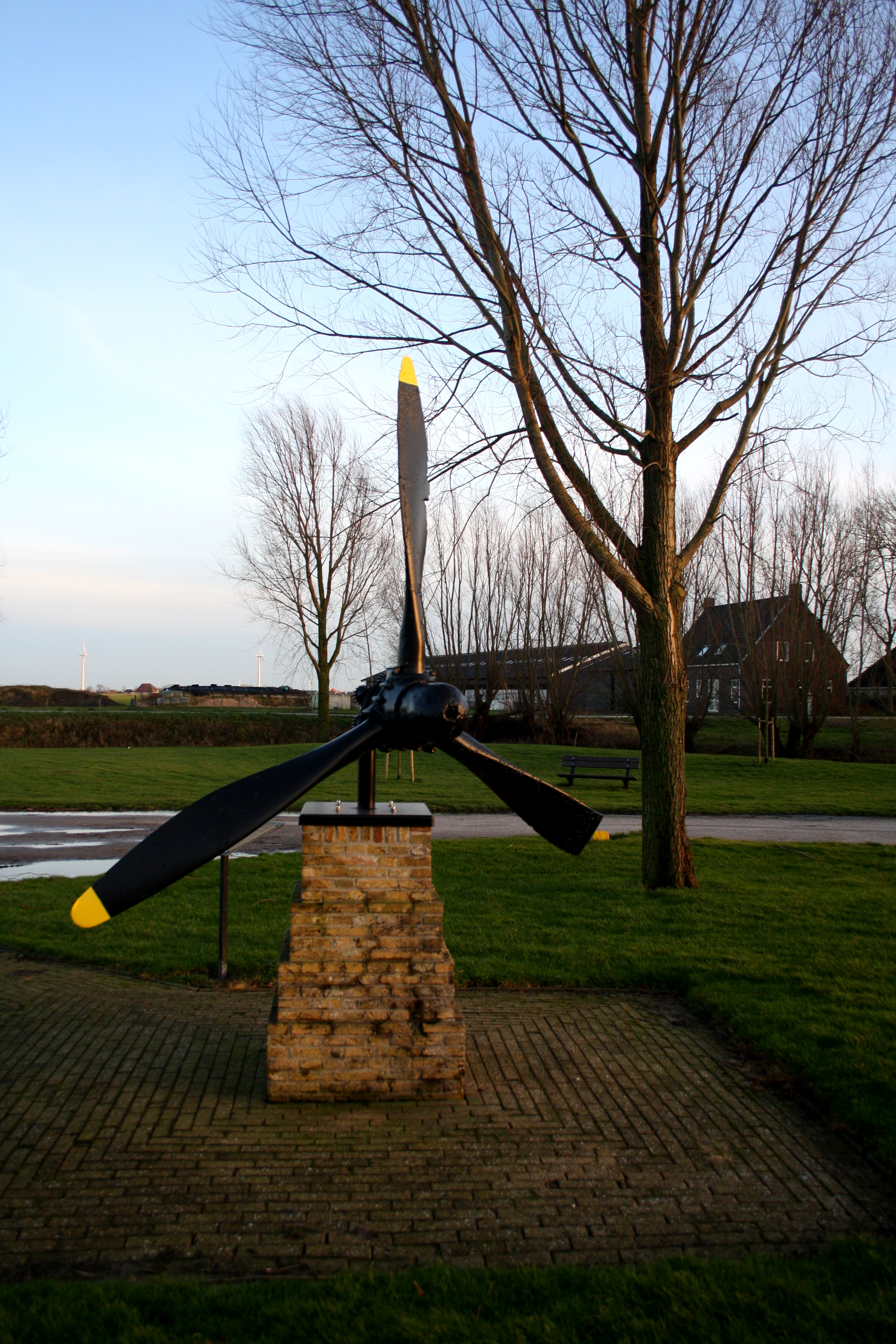
War memorial

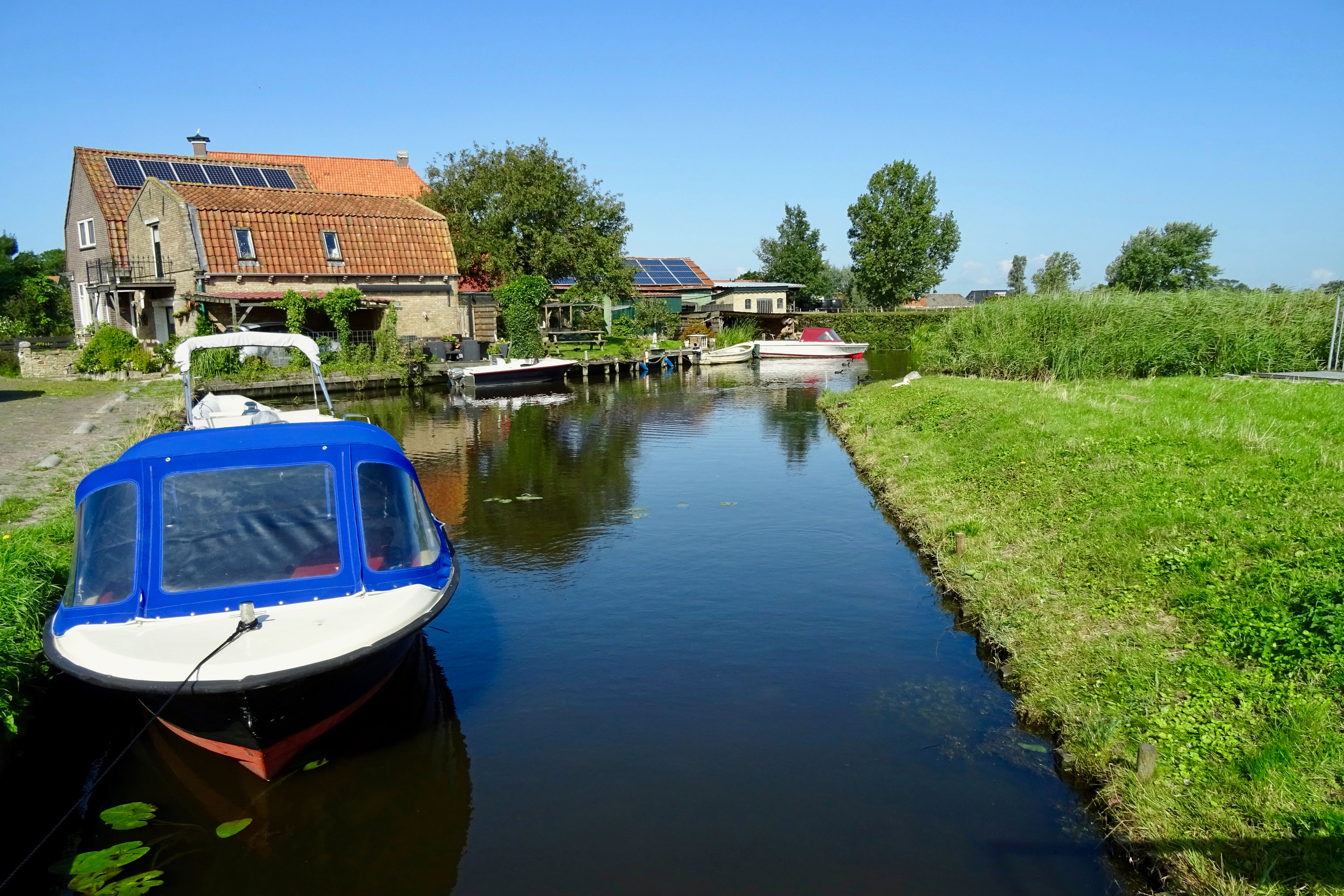
View on Exmorra

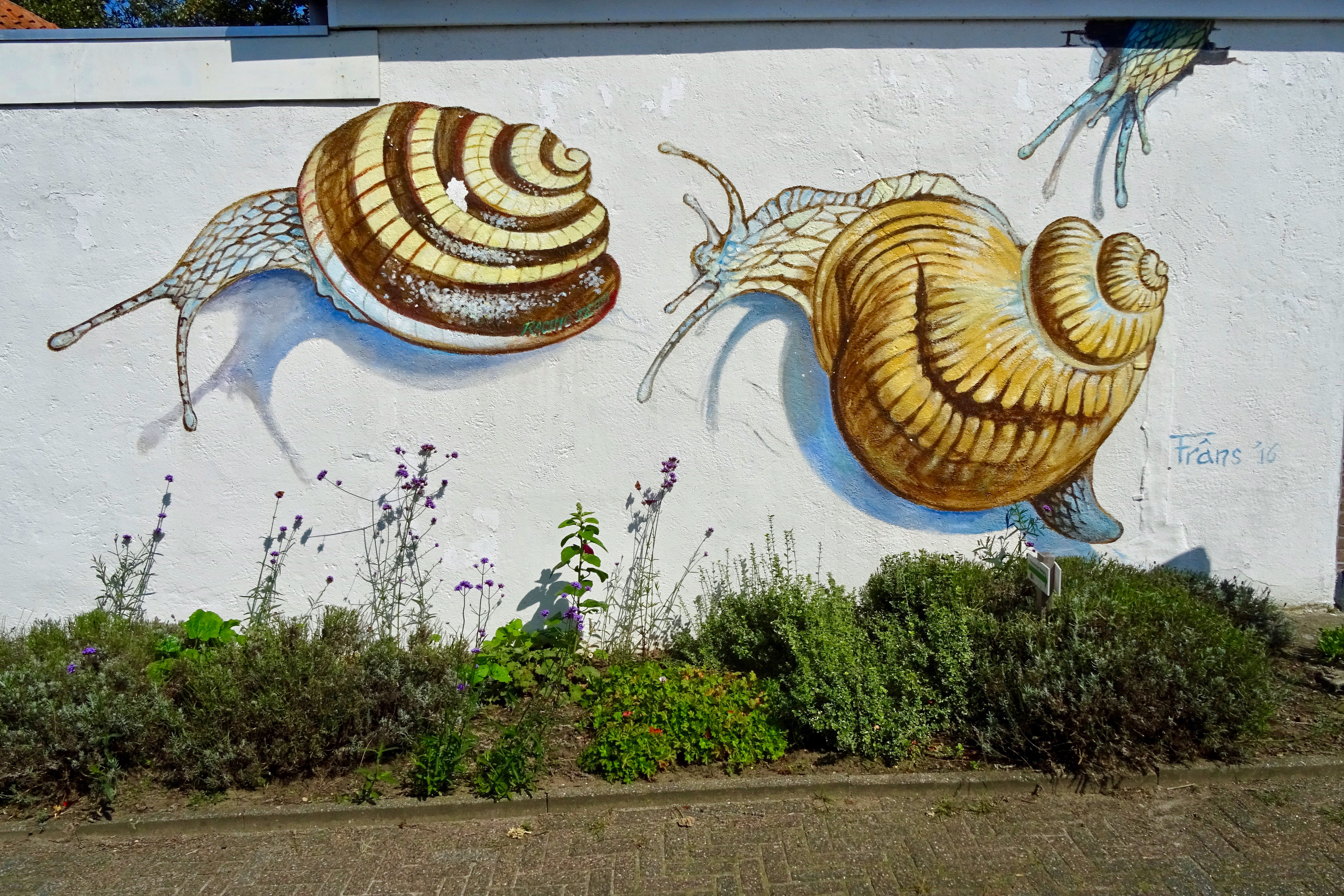
Snails by Frans Faber
