= WONS =

Wons or WONS may refer to:

- Wons, a village in Friesland, Netherlands
- Warrant Officer of the Naval Service, of the British Naval Service
- Weeds of National Significance
- WQRS, a radio station licensed to Cannonsburg, Kentucky, United States, which held the call sign WONS from 2015 to 2018
- WVTT-CD, a television station licensed to Olean, New York, United States, which held the call sign WONS-LP from 1999 to 2012
