= Schettens =

Schettens Skettens
- Village
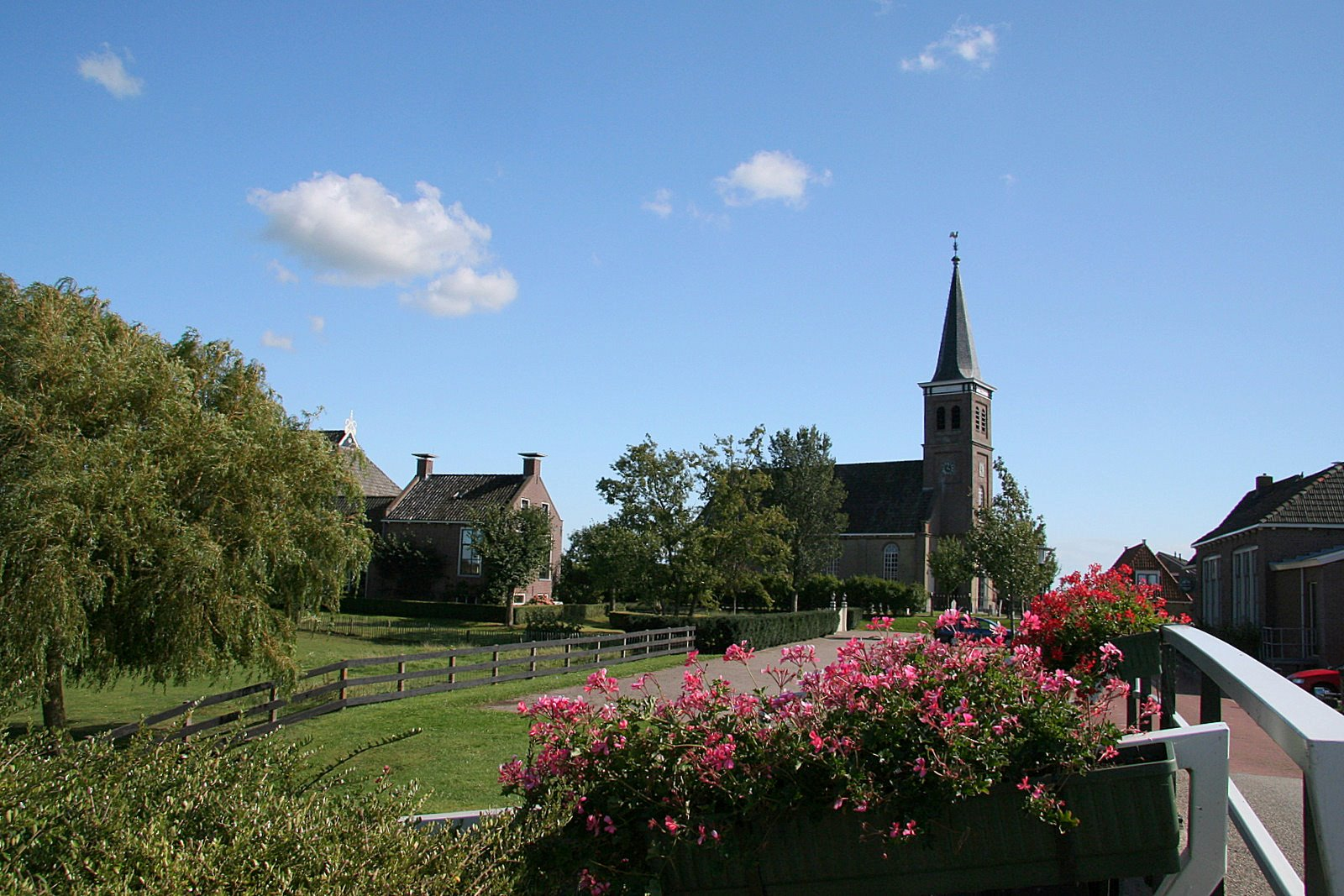
- Schettens Church

- Flag Coat of arms

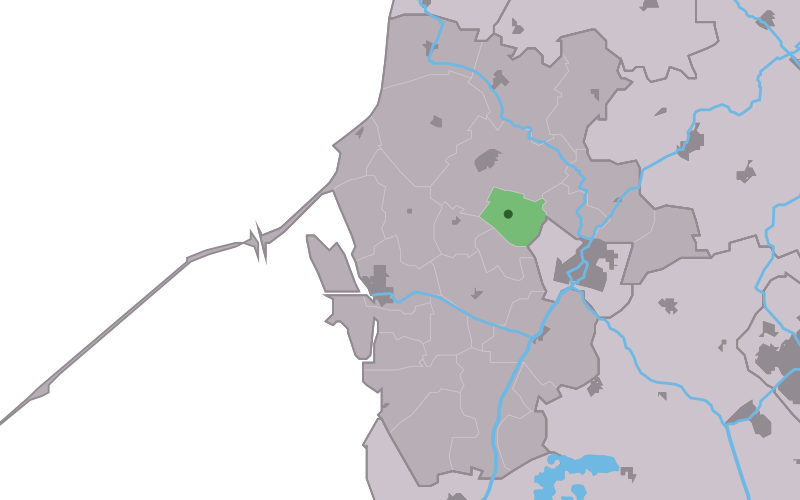
- Location in the former Wûnseradiel municipality

- Location in the Netherlands Schettens (Netherlands)
- Country: Netherlands
- Province: Friesland
- Municipality: Súdwest-Fryslân

Area
  - Total: 3.86 km^{2} (1.49 sq mi)
- Elevation: 0.2 m (0.66 ft)

Population (2021)
  - Total: 265
  - Density: 68.7/km^{2} (178/sq mi)
- Time zone: UTC+1 (CET)
  - Summer (DST): UTC+2 (CEST)
- Postal code: 8744
- Dialing code: 0517

Schettens (West Frisian: Skettens) is a village in Súdwest-Fryslân in the province of Friesland, the Netherlands. It had a population of around 285 in January 2017.

== History ==
The village was first mentioned in 855 as Sceddanuurthi. The etymology is unclear. Schettens is an old terp (artificial living hill) village near the former Marneslenk. Most of the terp has been excavated from 1830 onwards, and a stone wall has been built to protect the church.

The Dutch Reformed church was built in 1865 as a replacement for the medieval church. The tower was demolished in 1816 or 1819 and temporarily replaced by a wooden tower. In 1877, a stone tower was built.

Schettens was home to 95 people in 1840. There was a school named C.B.S. De Trijetine but it got closed in 2018. Before 2011, the village was part of the Wûnseradiel municipality.

== Gallery ==
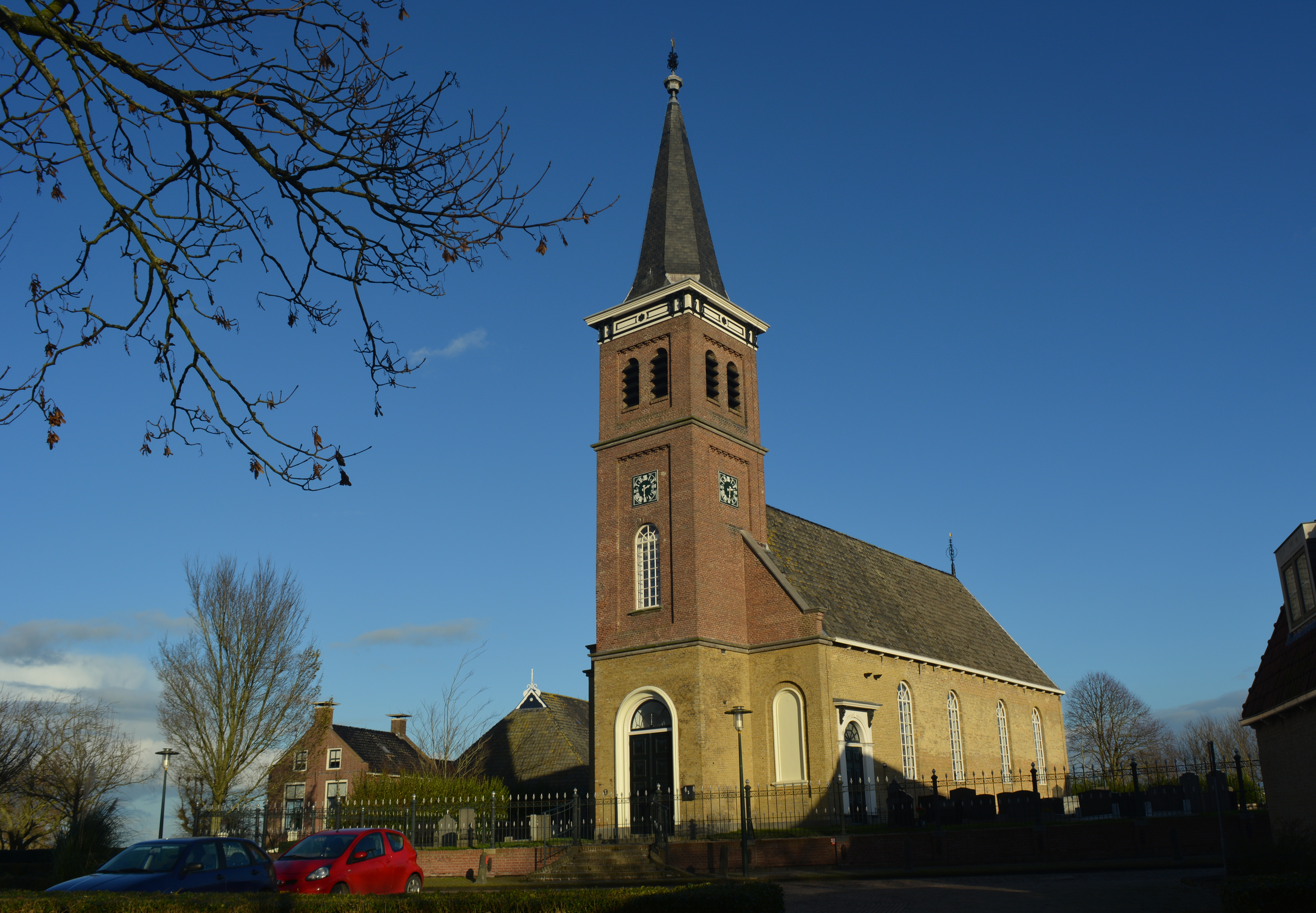
Protestant church of Schettens

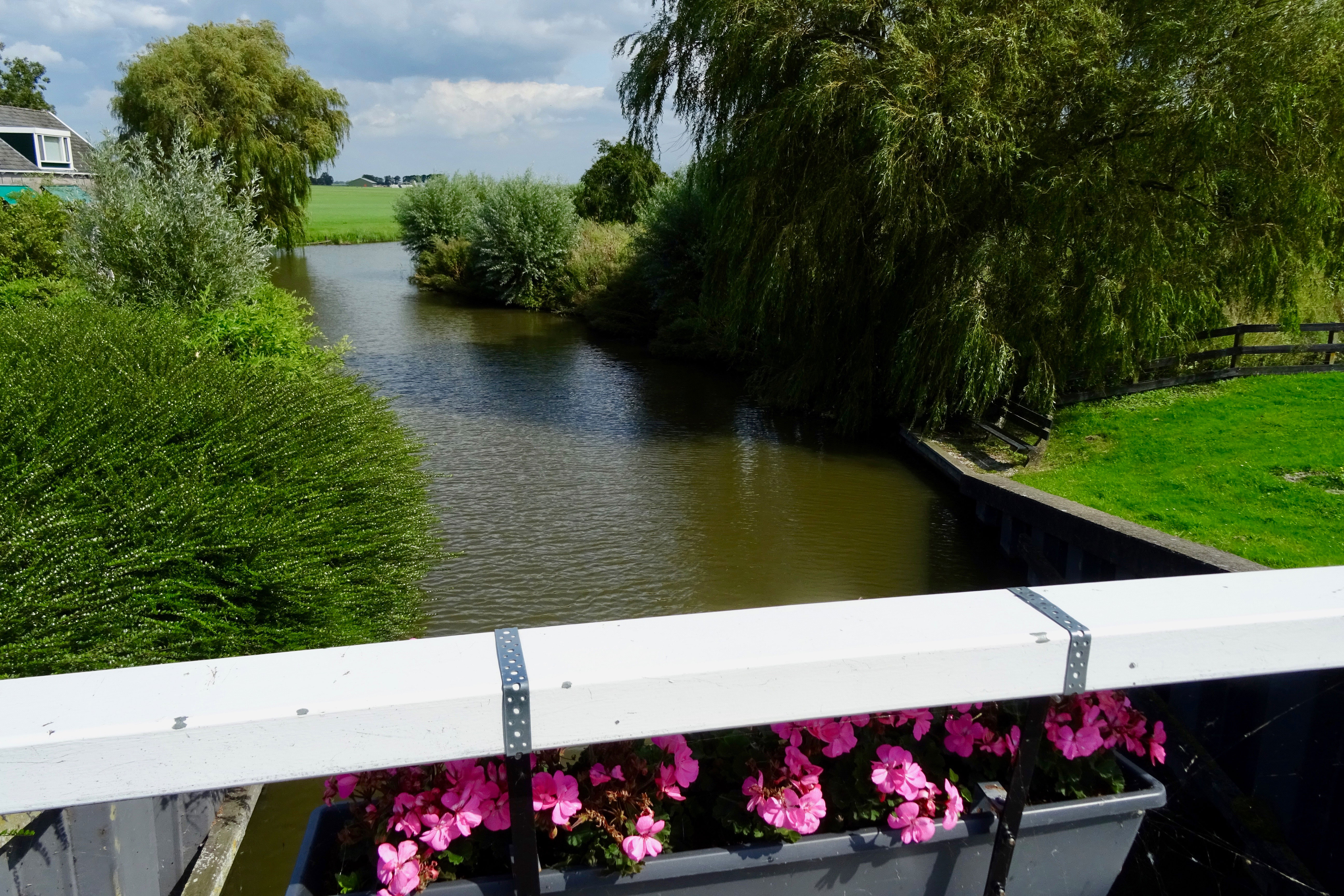
Canal view

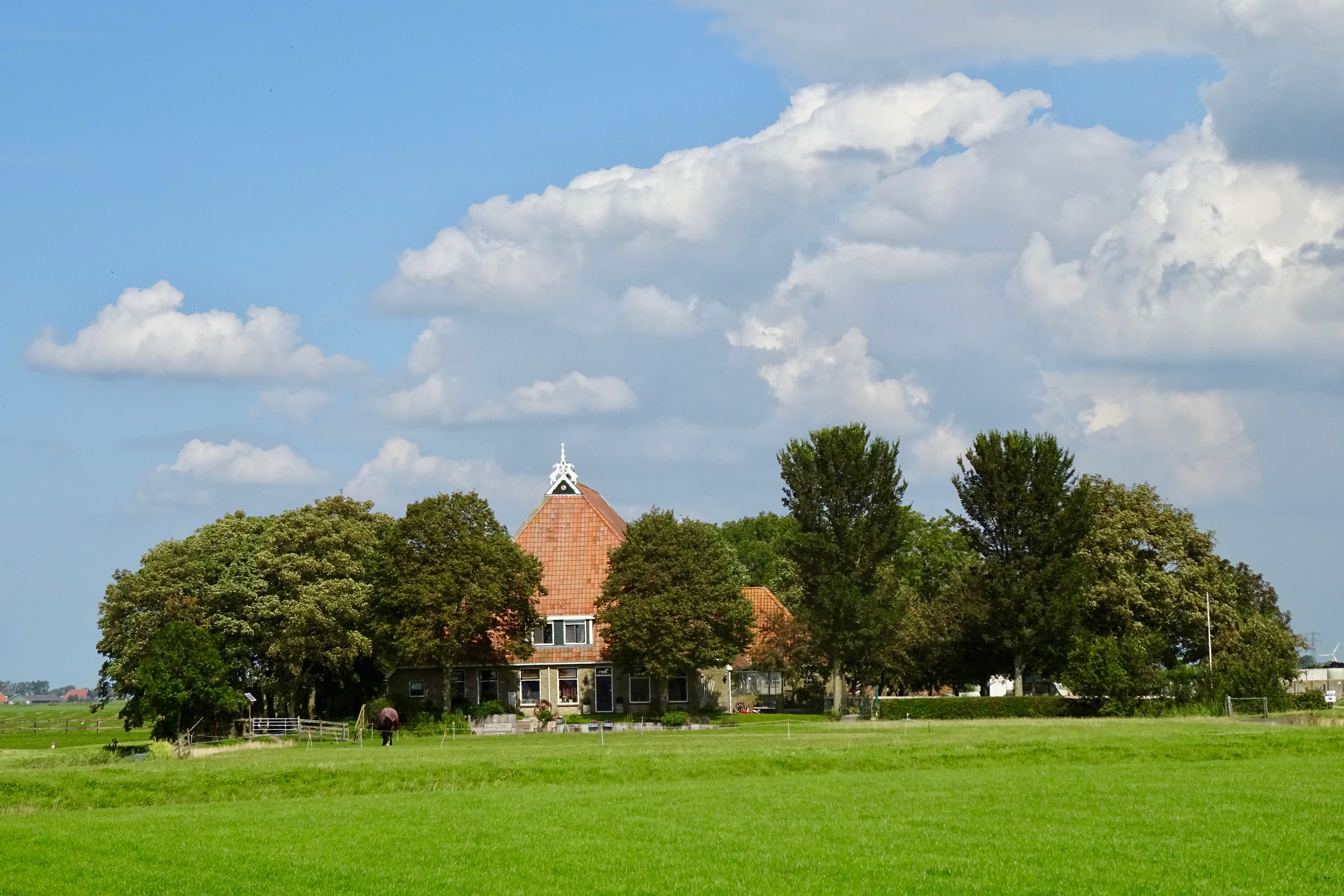
Farm near Schettens

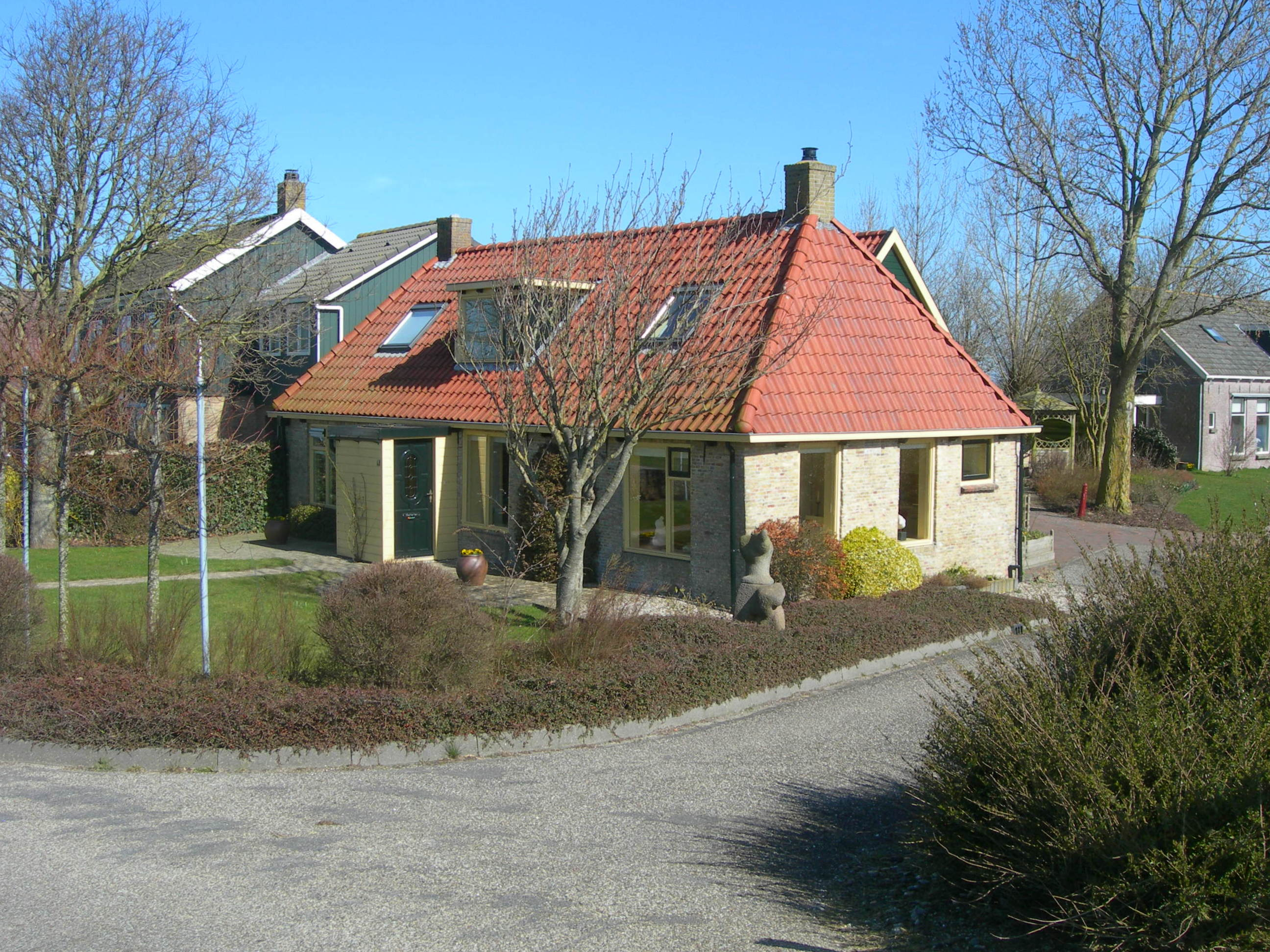
House in Schettens
