= Dedgum =

Dedgum Dedzjum
- Village
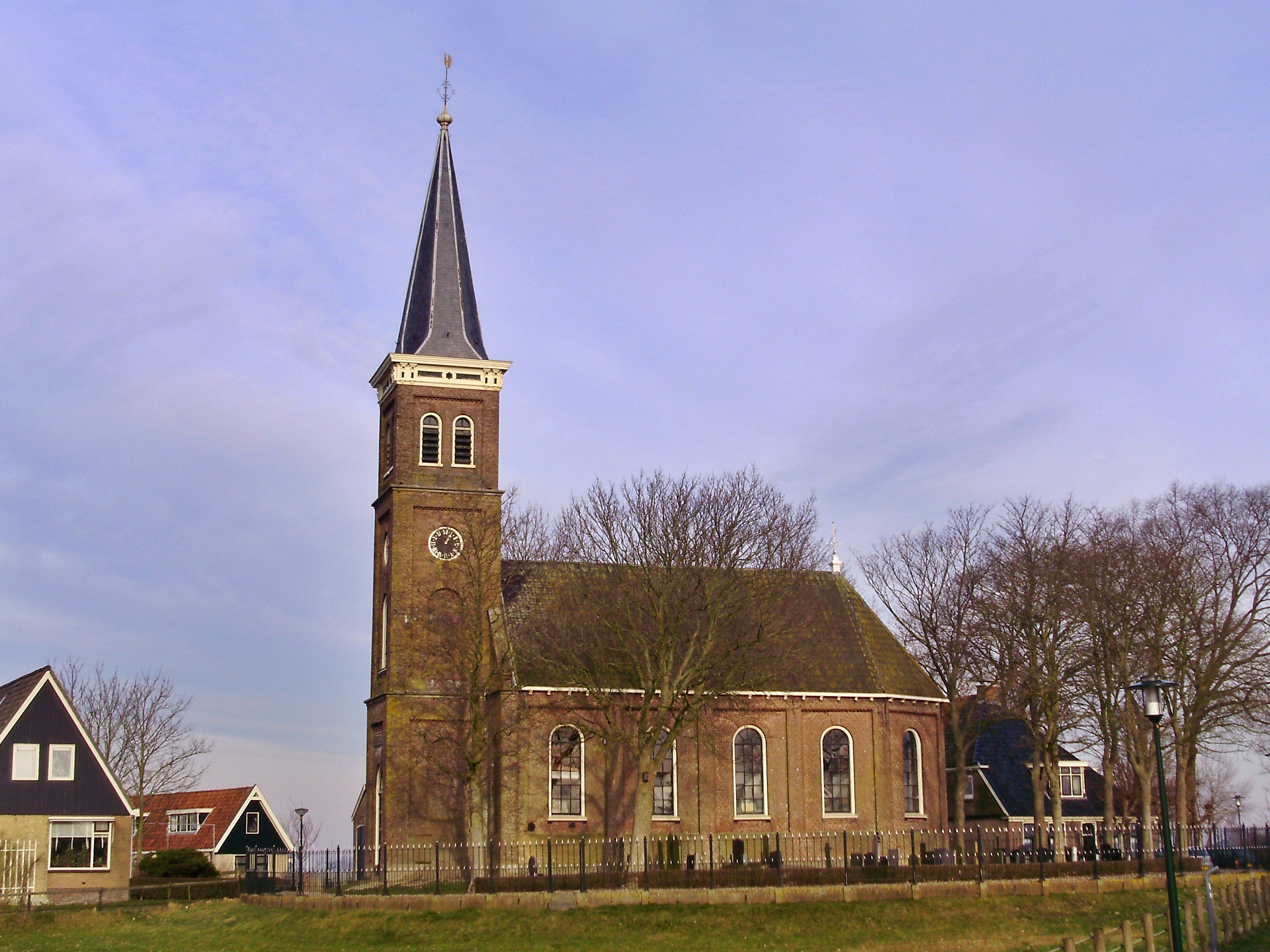
- Dedgum Church

- Flag Coat of arms

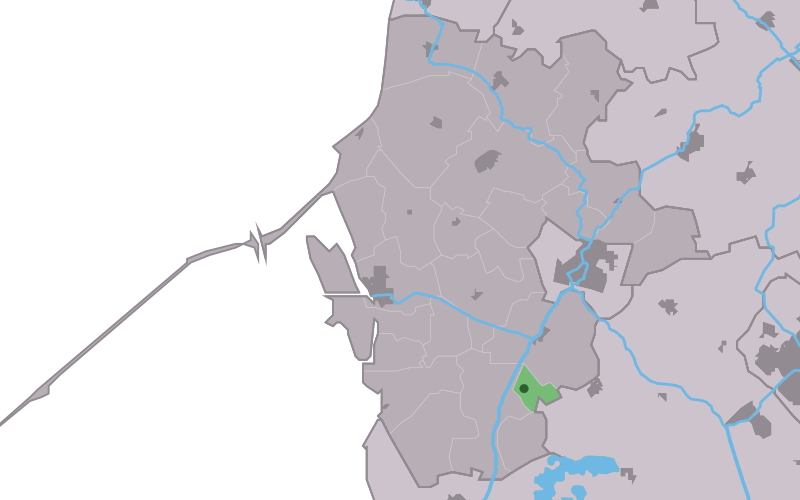
- Location in the former Wûnseradiel municipality

- Location in the Netherlands Dedgum (Netherlands)
- Country: Netherlands
- Province: Friesland
- Municipality: Súdwest-Fryslân

Area
  - Total: 1.53 km^{2} (0.59 sq mi)
- Elevation: −0.2 m (−0.66 ft)

Population (2021)
  - Total: 85
  - Density: 56/km^{2} (140/sq mi)
- Time zone: UTC+1 (CET)
  - Summer (DST): UTC+2 (CEST)
- Postal code: 8764
- Dialing code: 0515

Dedgum (West Frisian: Dedzjum) is a small village in Súdwest-Fryslân municipality in the province of Friesland, the Netherlands. It had a population of around 95 in January 2017.

== History ==
The village was first mentioned in 855 as Deddingiuuerbe. It probably means "terp of the people of Deddo". Dedgum is a terp (artificial living hill) whose round structure is still clearly visible in the landscape. It was located along the former Marne river and close to the Sensmeer which was poldered in 1634. Part of the terp was later excavated, resulting in a steep slope. The early reference from 855 is a donation of land by Folker from Dedgum to the Werden Abbey near Essen, Germany.

The Dutch Reformed was from the 13th century, but was demolished and replaced in 1889. The gate of the original church is on display at the Fries Museum. The church is nowadays in use as village house and contains a bed and breakfast. There used to be a significant Catholic presence in Dedgum, however many moved to Blauwhuis.

Dedgum was home to 131 people in 1840.

Before 2011, the village was part of the Wûnseradiel municipality.

== Gallery ==
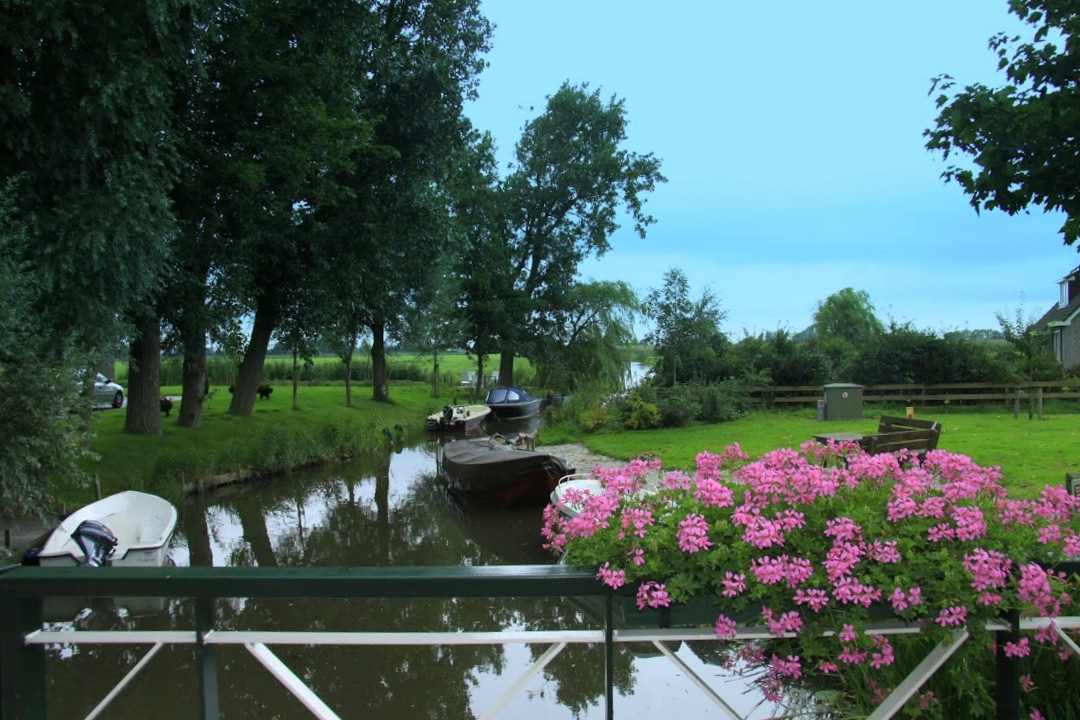
Canal view

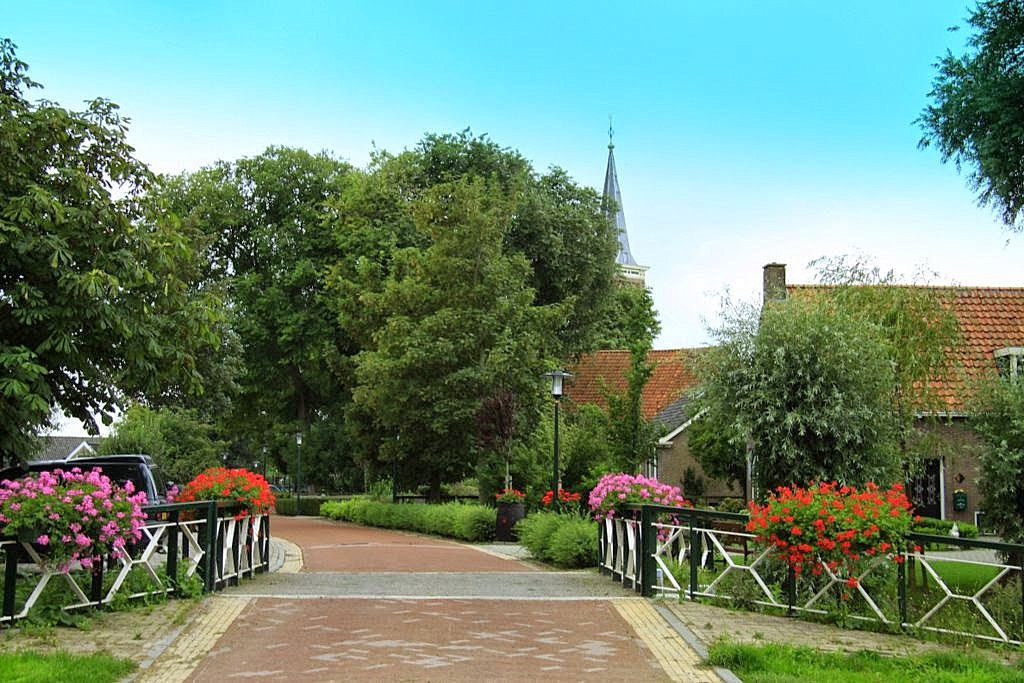
Entrance to the village

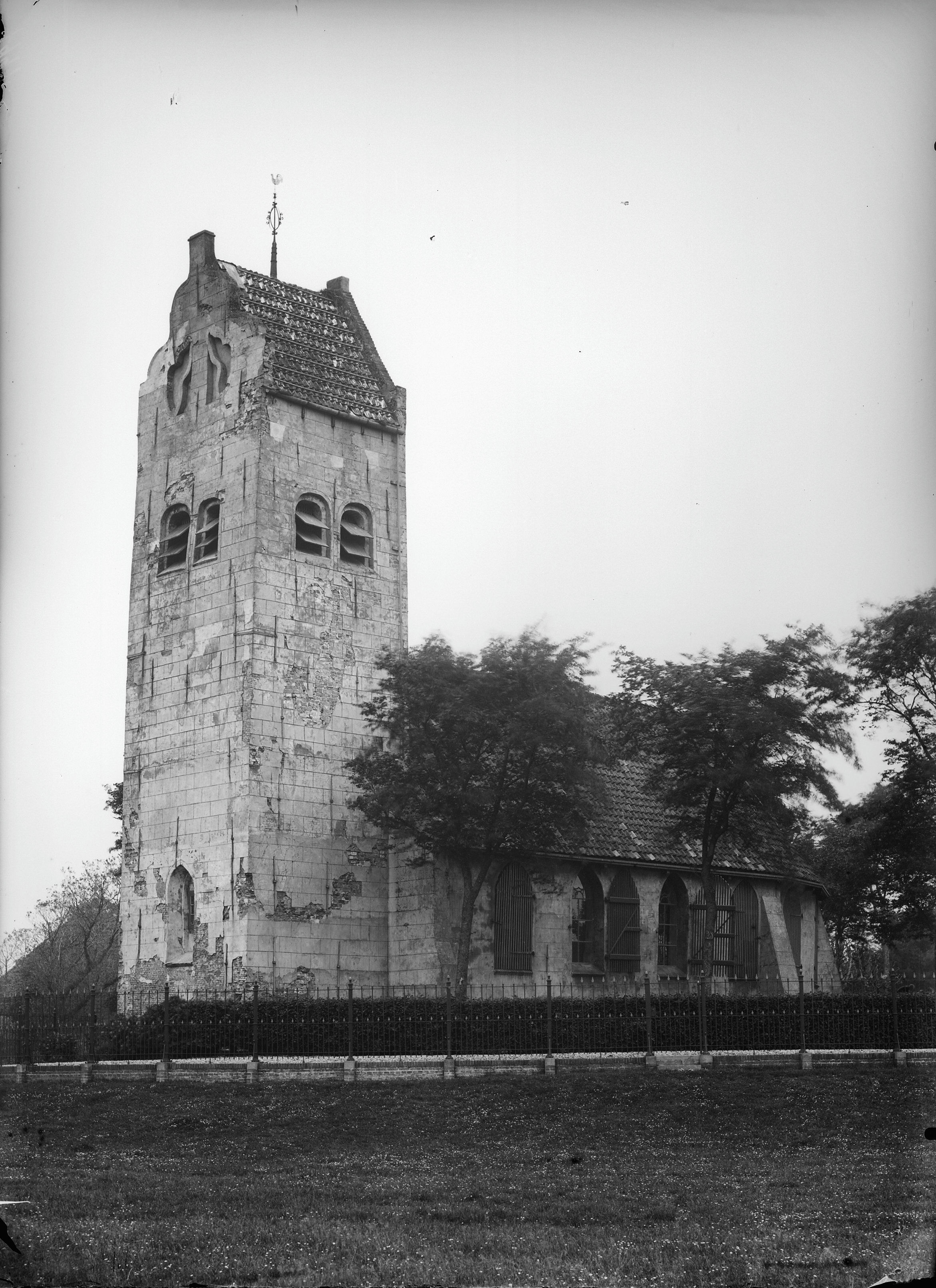
The old church before it was torn down (1889)
