= Gaast =

- Village
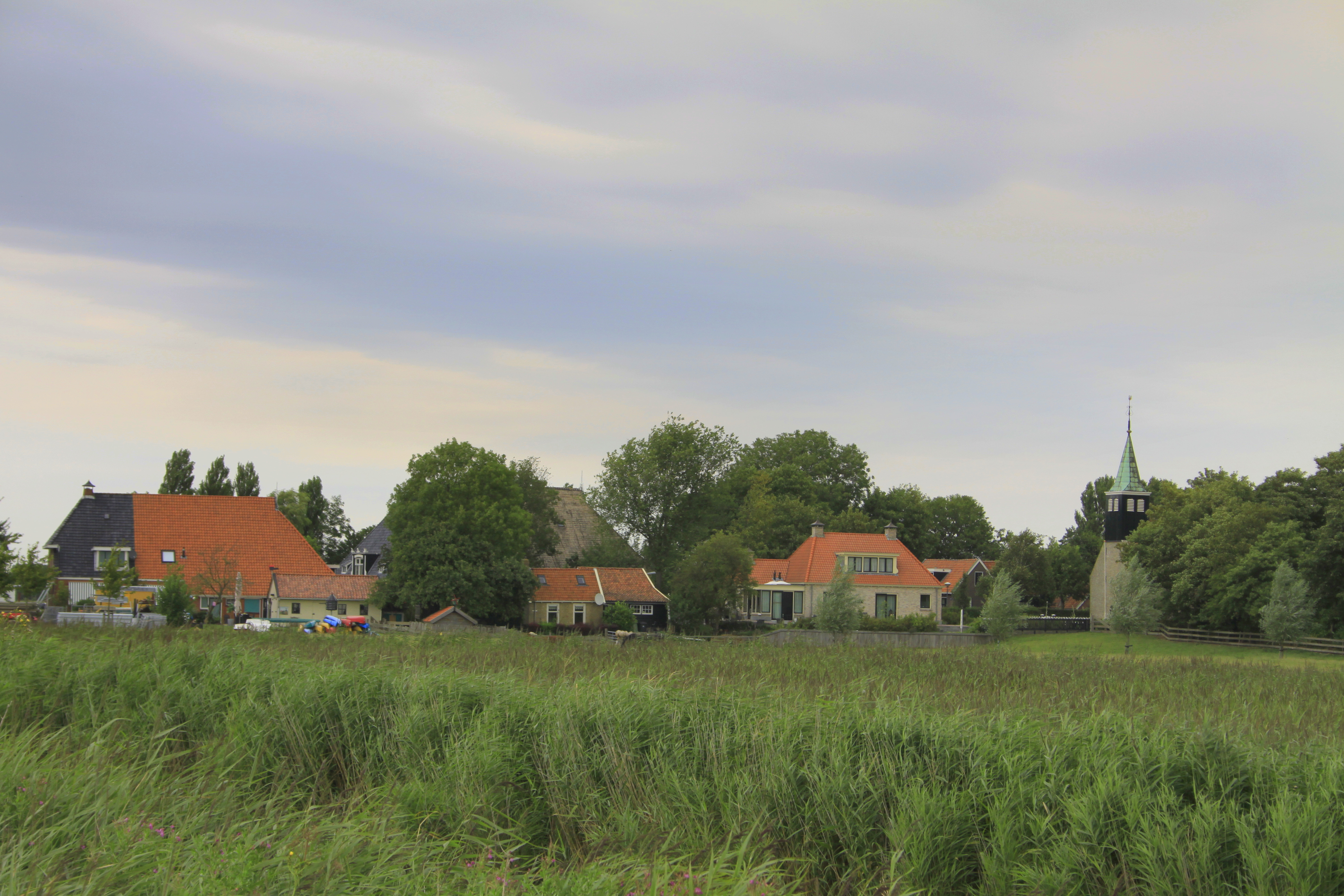
- Gaast

- Flag Coat of arms

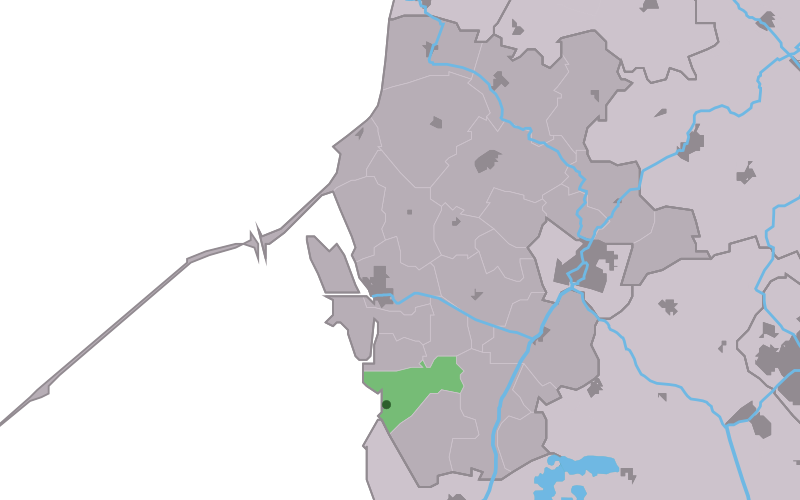
- Location in the former Wûnseradiel municipality

- Location in the Netherlands Gaast (Netherlands)
- Country: Netherlands
- Province: Friesland
- Municipality: Súdwest-Fryslân

Area
  - Total: 5.69 km^{2} (2.20 sq mi)
- Elevation: 1.0 m (3.3 ft)

Population (2021)
  - Total: 200
  - Density: 35/km^{2} (91/sq mi)
- Time zone: UTC+1 (CET)
  - Summer (DST): UTC+2 (CEST)
- Postal code: 8757
- Dialing code: 0515

Gaast is a village in Súdwest-Fryslân municipality in the province of Friesland, the Netherlands. It had a population of around 220 in January 2017.

== History ==
The village was first mentioned in the 13th century as lutekagast, and means "geest (higher sandy ground)". Gaast developed on a sand bank near the former Zuiderzee (nowadays: IJsselmeer). Its proximity to the sea has caused problems. In 1643, the dyke broke. In 1702, it managed to hold on, however 23 ships off the coast sank near Gaast. The economy used to be based on fishing and sailing, however it has become an agricultural community.

The Dutch Reformed church was built in the 14th century, and has been restored in 1916.

Gaast was home to 217 people in 1840. Before 2011, the village was part of the Wûnseradiel municipality.

== Gallery ==
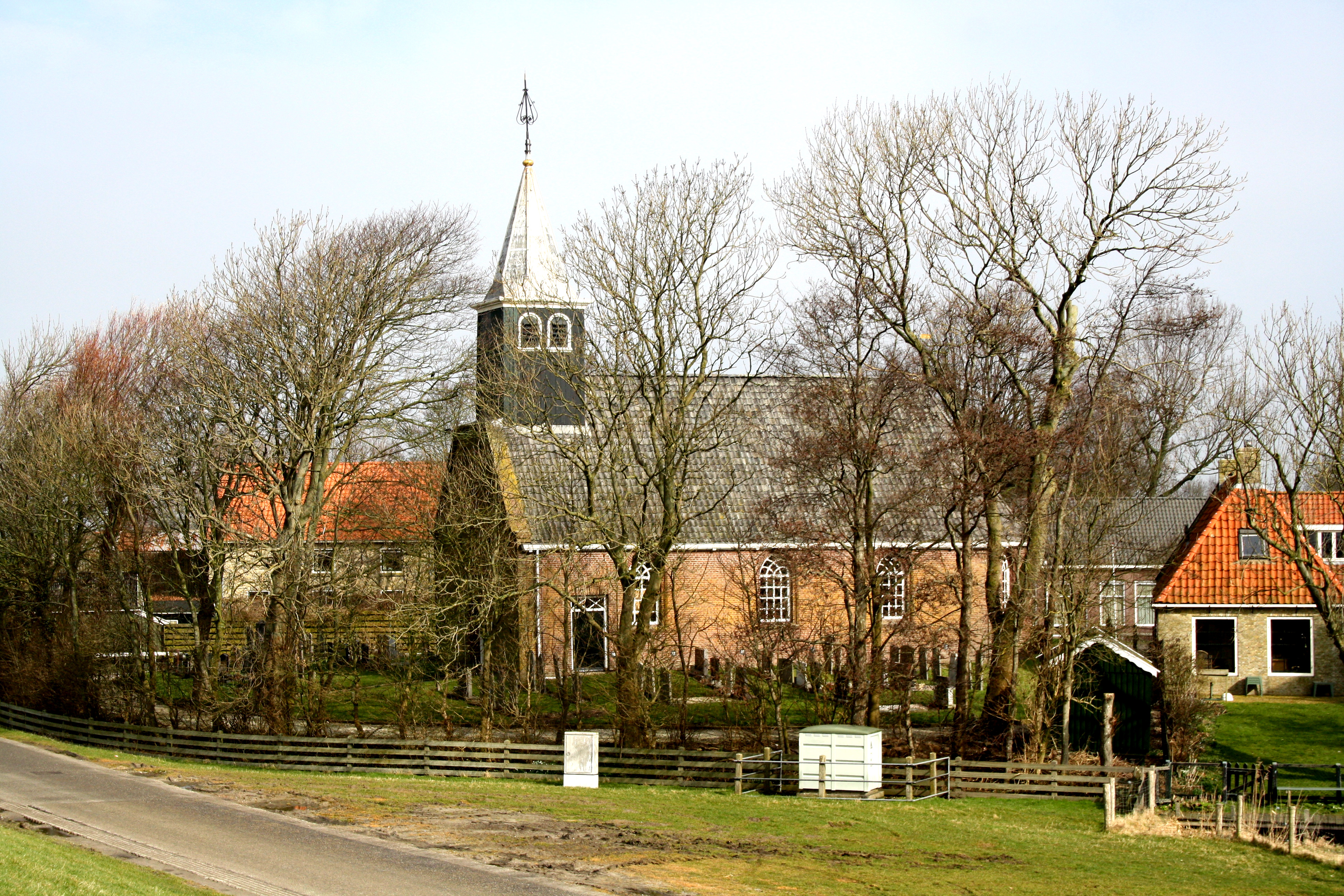
Church of Gaast

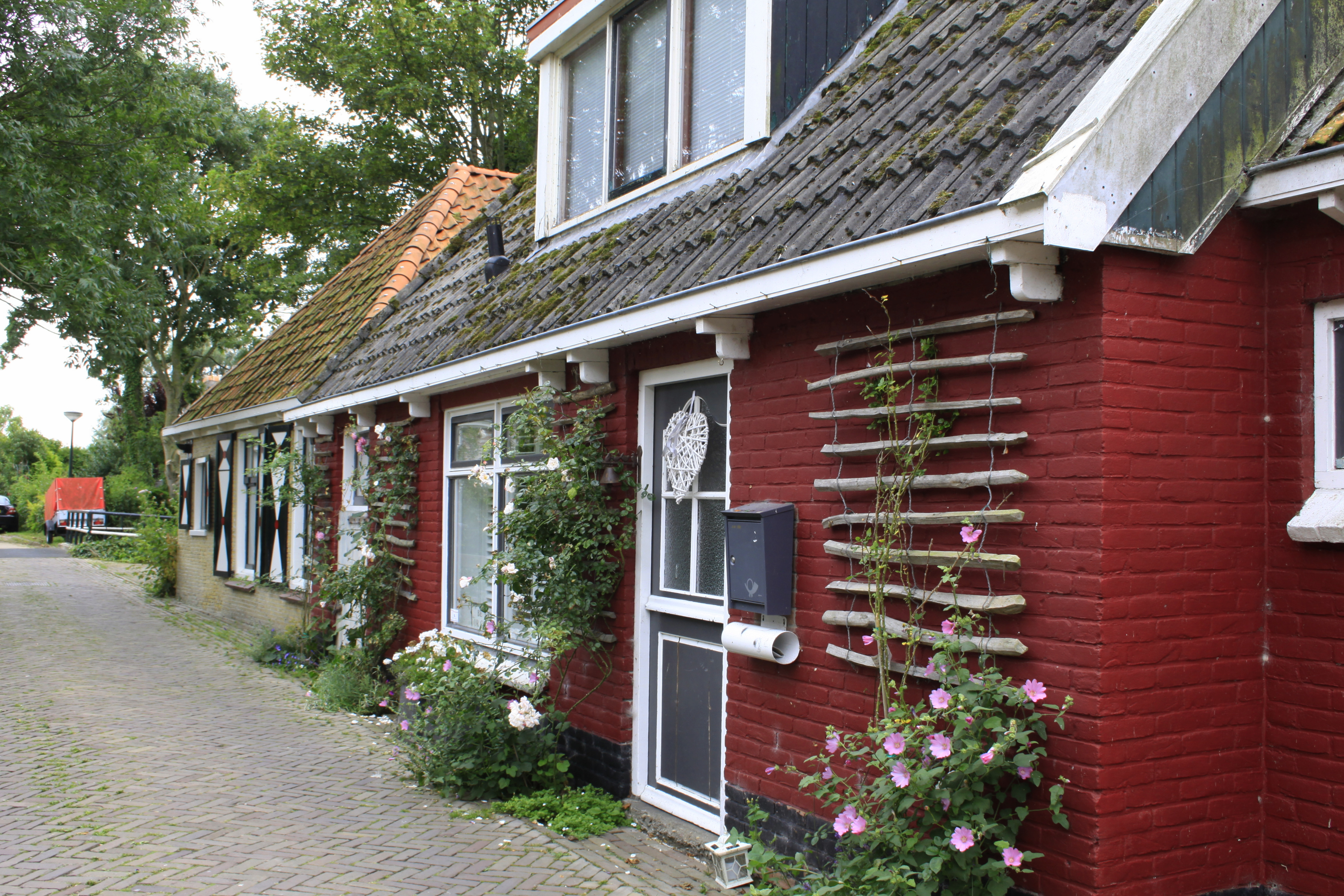
Street of Gaast

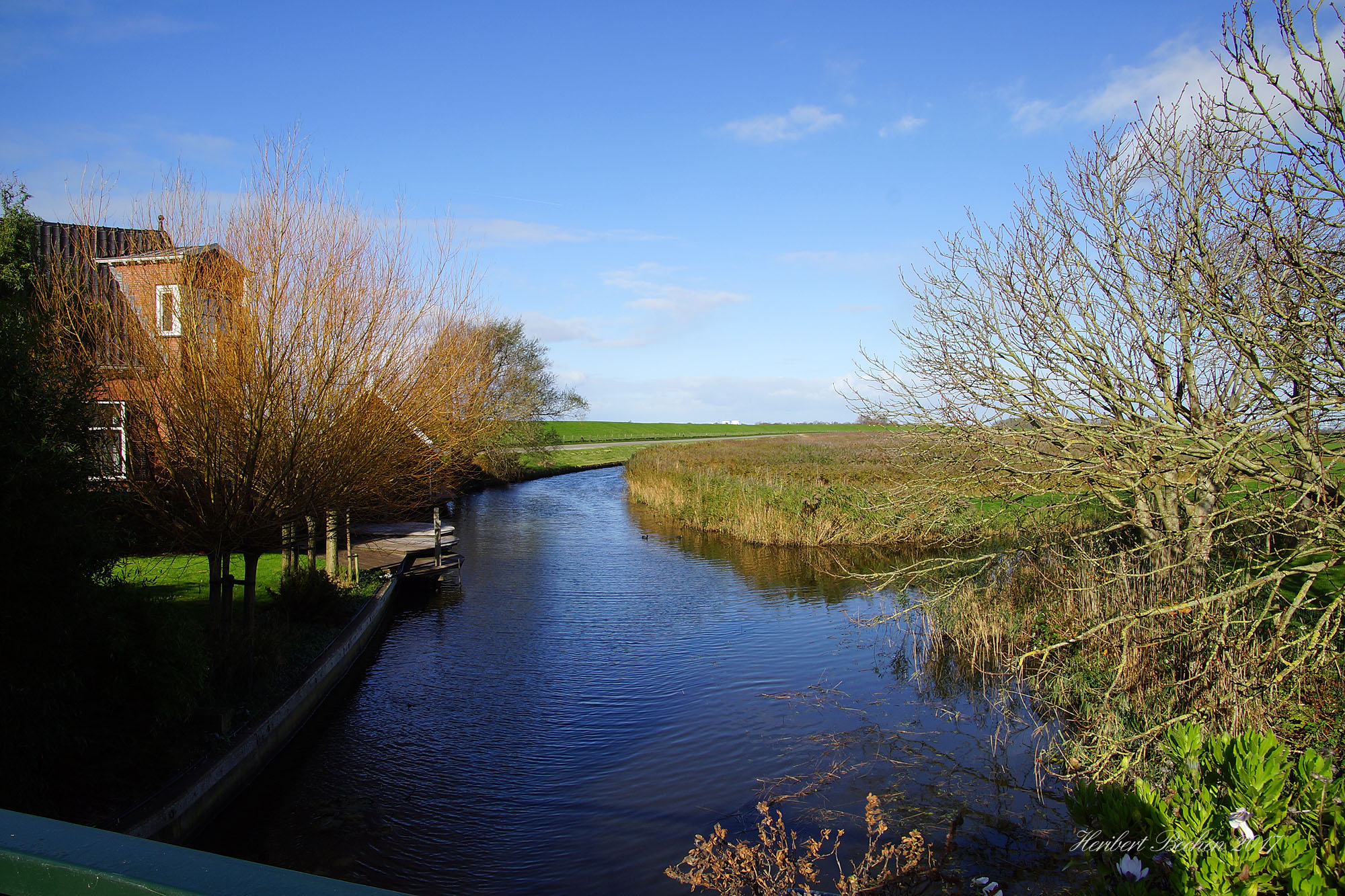
Canal view

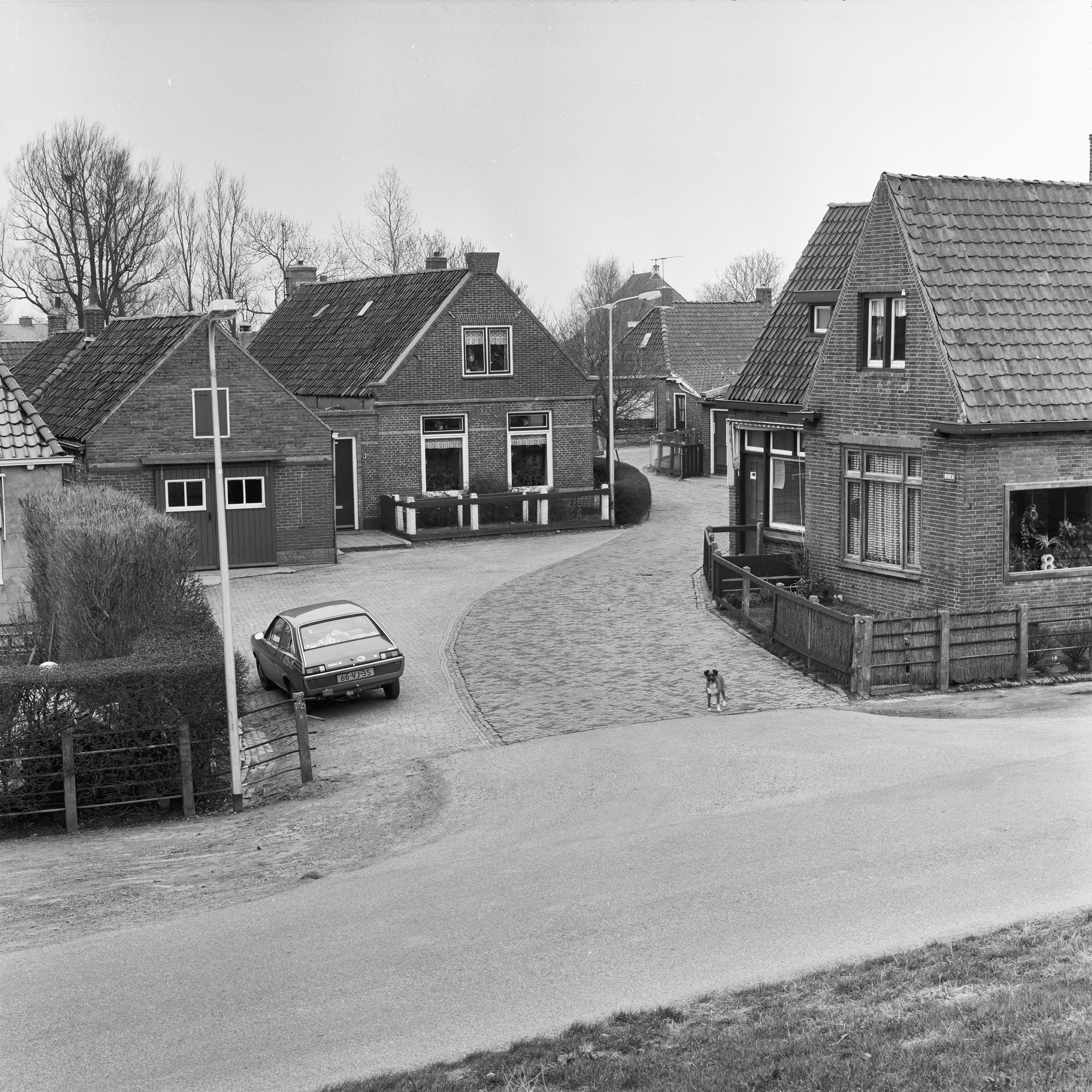
View from the dike (1979)
