= Piaam =

- Village
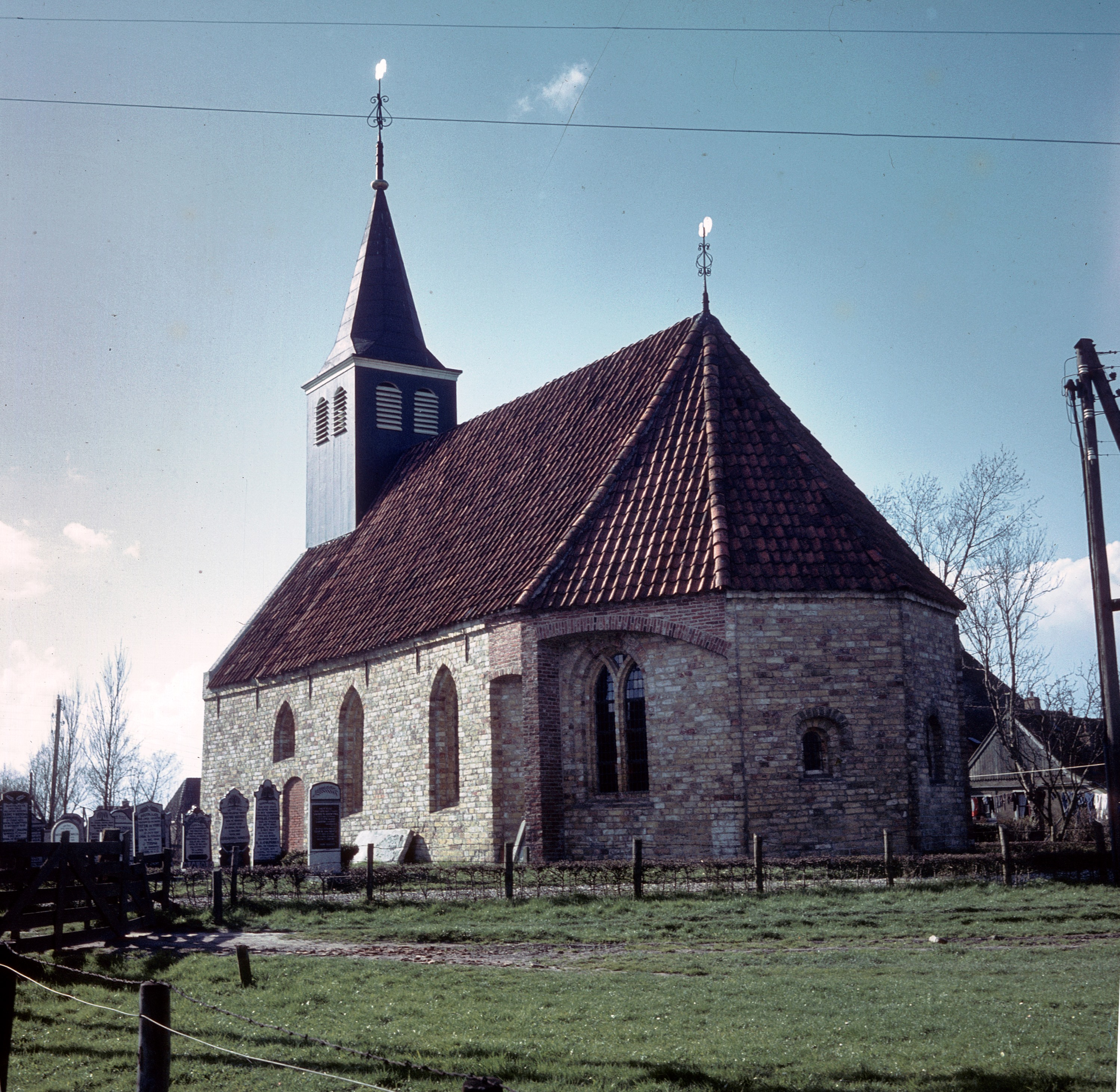
- Piaam Church

- Flag Coat of arms

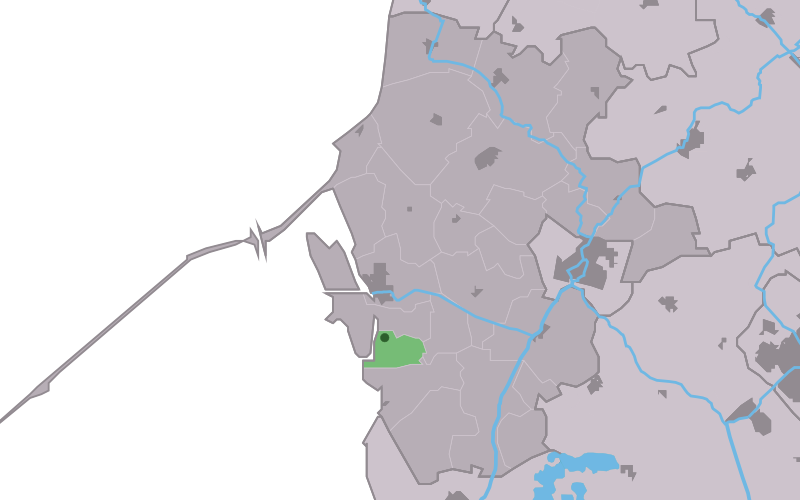
- Location in the former Wûnseradiel municipality

- Location in the Netherlands Piaam (Netherlands)
- Country: Netherlands
- Province: Friesland
- Municipality: Súdwest-Fryslân

Area
  - Total: 2.55 km^{2} (0.98 sq mi)
- Elevation: −0.4 m (−1.3 ft)

Population (2021)
  - Total: 50
  - Density: 20/km^{2} (51/sq mi)
- Time zone: UTC+1 (CET)
  - Summer (DST): UTC+2 (CEST)
- Postal code: 8756
- Dialing code: 0515

Piaam is a small village in the municipality of Súdwest-Fryslân in the province of Friesland, the Netherlands. It had a population of around 50 in January 2017.

== History ==
The village was first mentioned in the 13th century as Pyangum and means "settlement of Pada or Pya (person)". Piaam developed along the former Zuiderzee (nowadays IJsselmeer) coast near two lakes: Feitemeer and Parregaastermeer. The village is located on a dead-end street from the former sea dike.

The Dutch Reformed church dates from the 13th century. In 1899, a Christian Reformed church was built in the village. In 1969, it was decommissioned and has become a bird museum with a collection of over 200 birds that are native to the area.

Piaam was home to 100 people in 1840. Between 1876 and 1879, the lakes were poldered and named Polder Kooihuizen after the former duck decoys in the area. Before 2011, the village was part of the Wûnseradiel municipality.

== Gallery ==
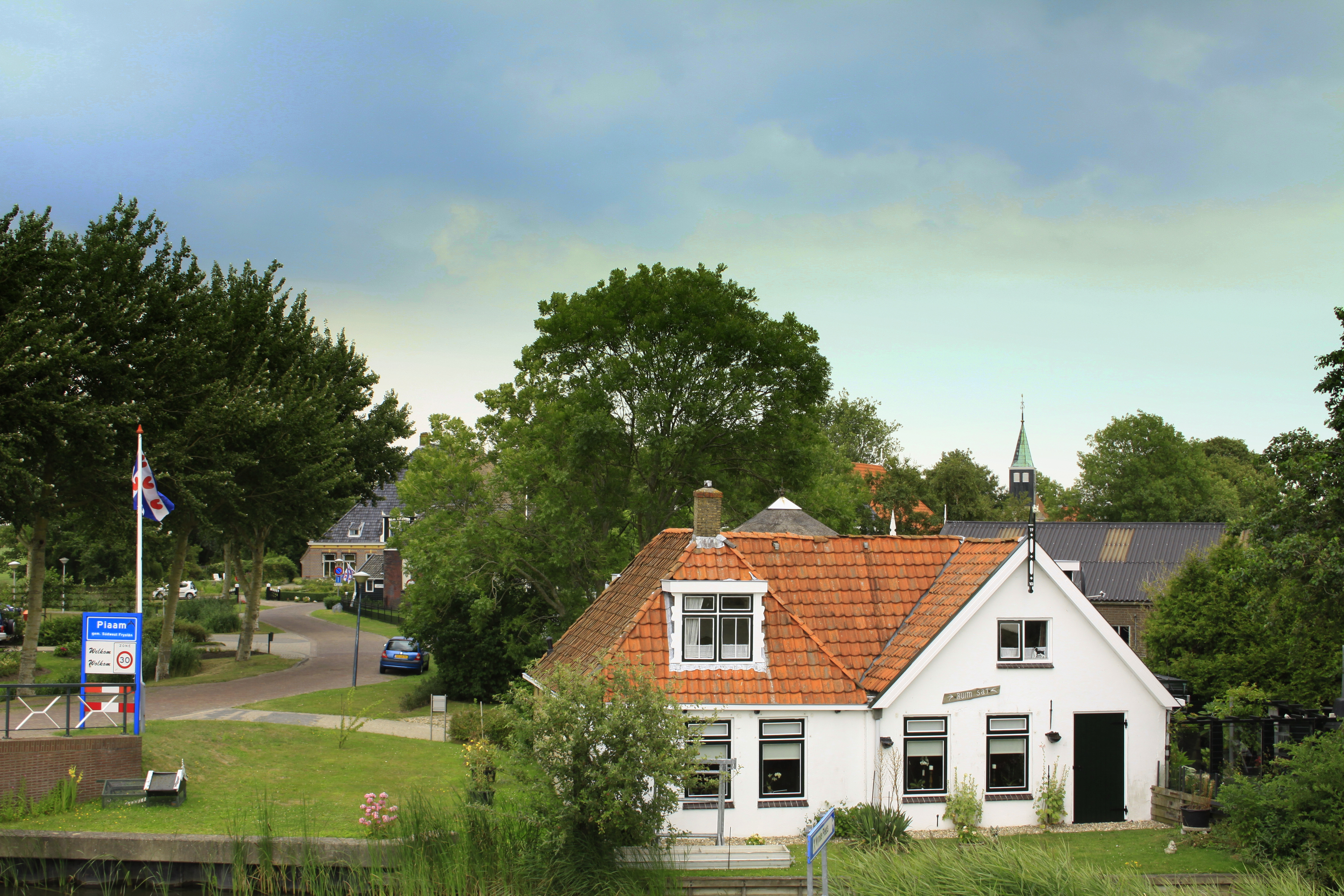
View on Piaam

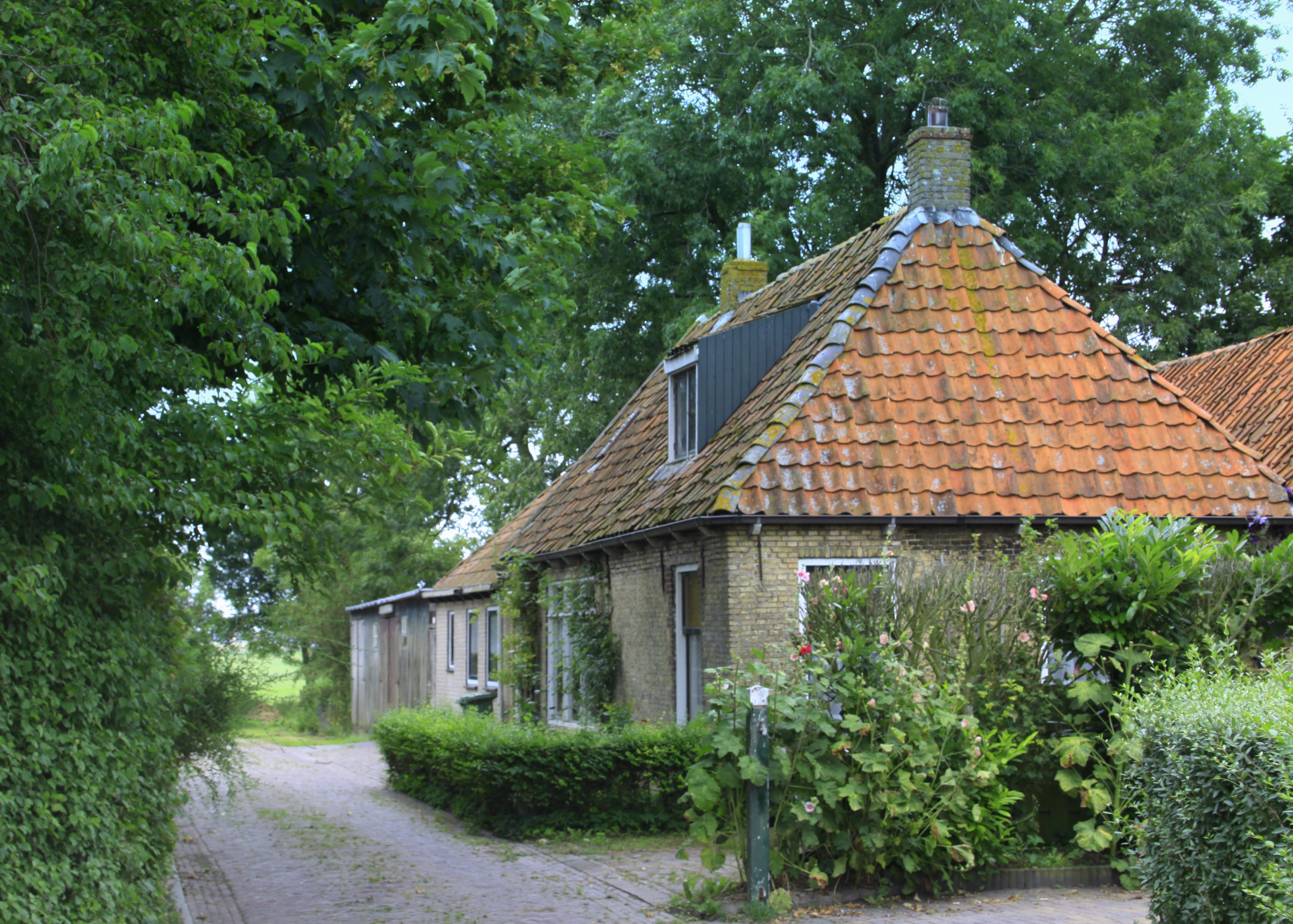
House in Piaam

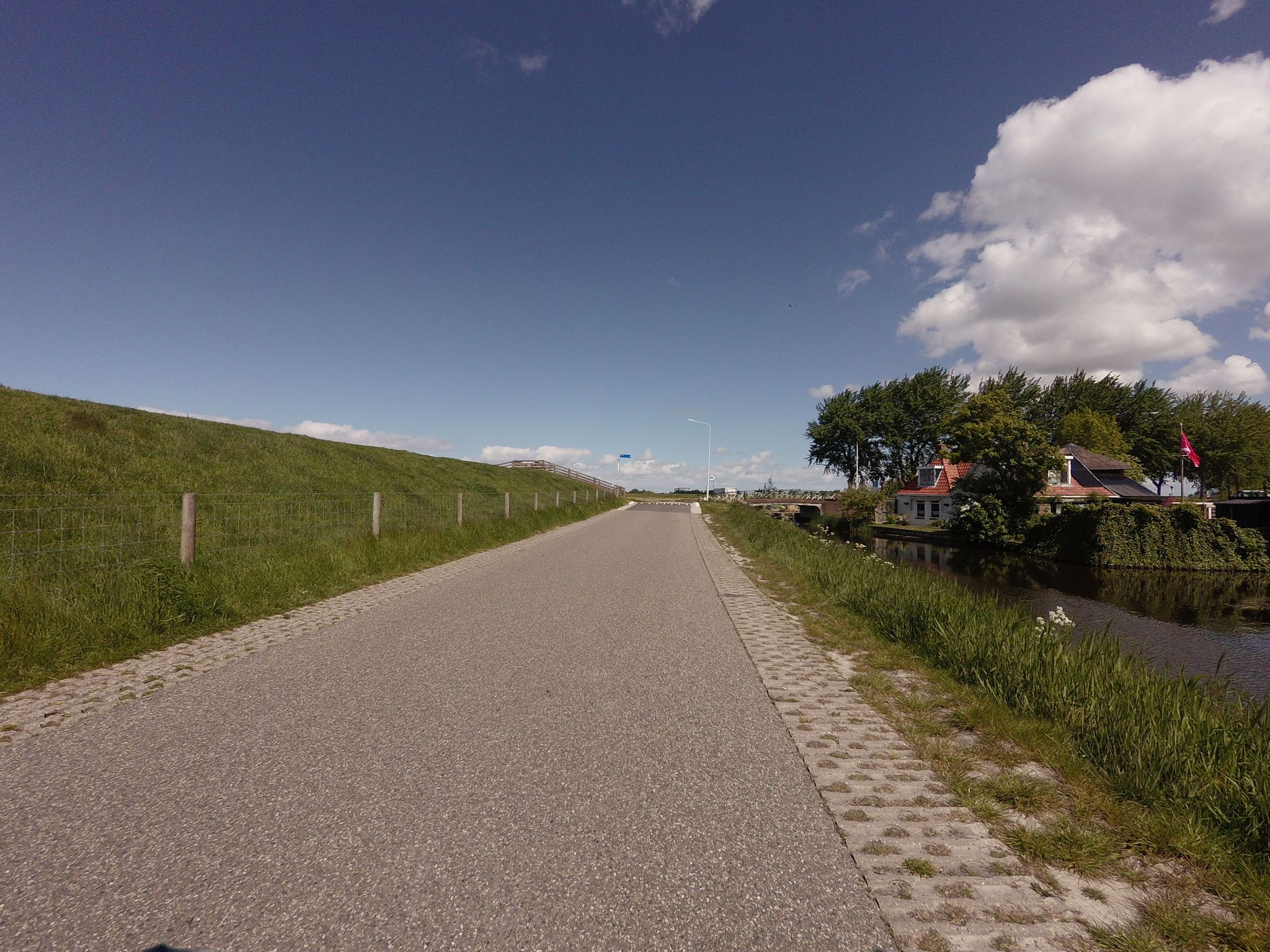
Piaam from the sea dike

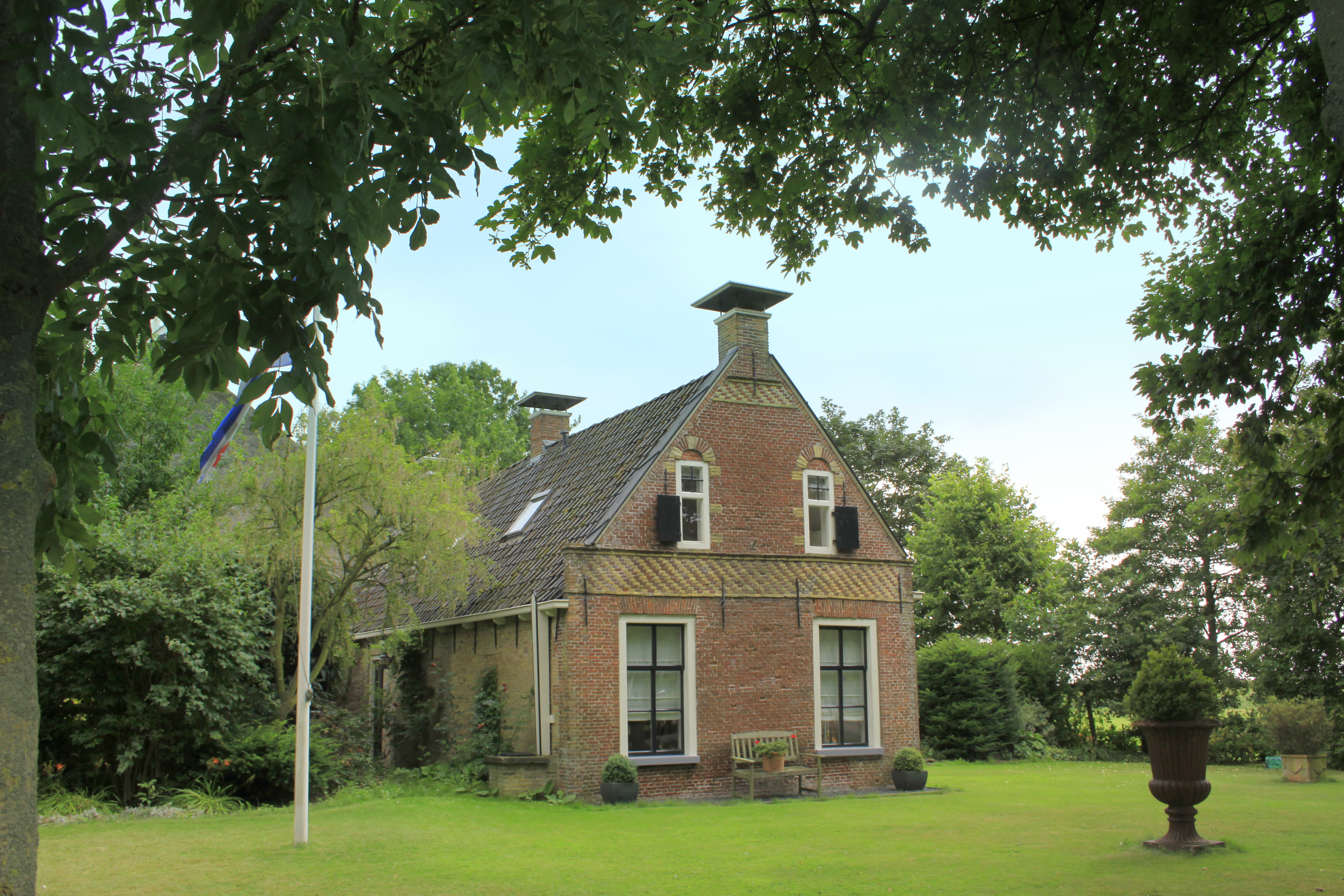
Farm in Piaam
