= Wûnseradiel =

Wonseradeel Wûnseradiel
- Former municipality
- Flag Coat of arms

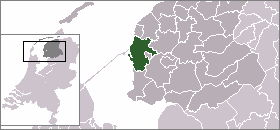
- Coordinates: 53°6′N 5°28′E
- Country: Netherlands
- Province: Fryslân
- Municipality: Súdwest-Fryslân

Area (2006)
  - Total: 317.68 km^{2} (122.66 sq mi)
  - Land: 158.50 km^{2} (61.20 sq mi)
  - Water: 159.18 km^{2} (61.46 sq mi)

Population (1 January 2007)
  - Total: 11,886
  - Density: 75/km^{2} (190/sq mi)
- Source: CBS, Statline.
- Time zone: UTC+1 (CET)
  - Summer (DST): UTC+2 (CEST)

Wûnseradiel (pronounced [ˈʋũːsəraˌdiəl]) is a former municipality in the Friesland province of the northern Netherlands, at the eastern end of the Afsluitdijk. The official (legal) name of the municipality is in the West Frisian language, though it is known as Wonseradeel (pronounced [ˈʋɔnsəraːˌdeːl]) in Dutch. In 2011 it was merged with the municipalities of Bolsward, Nijefurd, Sneek and Wymbritseradiel forming the new municipality Súdwest-Fryslân.

== Towns and villages ==
Allingawier, Arum, Burgwerd, Cornwerd, Dedgum, Exmorra, Ferwoude, Gaast, Hartwerd, Hichtum, Hieslum, Idsegahuizum, Kimswerd, Kornwerderzand, Lollum, Longerhouw, Makkum, Parrega, Piaam, Pingjum, Schettens, Schraard, Tjerkwerd, Witmarsum, Wons, Zurich.

=== Hamlets ===
Arkum, Atzeburen, Baarderburen, Baburen, Breezanddijk, De Blokken, Dijksterburen, Doniaburen, Eemswoude, Engwier, Exmorrazijl, Gooium, Grauwe Kat, Harkezijl, Hayum, Hemert, Idserdaburen, It Fliet, Jonkershuizen, Jousterp, Kampen, Kooihuizen, Koudehuizum, Rijtseterp, Scharneburen, Strand, Vierhuizen, Wonneburen

== Famous inhabitants ==
- Pier Gerlofs Donia, better known as 'Grutte Pier', was an infamous freedom fighter from Kimswerd born sometime near the year 1480, who led a guerrilla war against the occupying forces after his village was plundered in 1515. He led the Frisian rebel army, the Arumer Zwarte Hoop from 1515 until 1519.
- Wijard Jelckama was a Frisian military commander and freedom fighter. He co-founded the Arumer Zwarte Hoop and led it from 1519 until his death by decapitation in 1523.
- Menno Simons was born in Witmarsum in 1492 or 1496. He was a leader of the Dutch Anabaptists or Mennonites.
- B.D. Dykstra was born in Pingjum in 1872. He emigrated to Iowa and became a leader in the Reformed Church in America.
