= Schraard =

Schraard Skraard
- Village
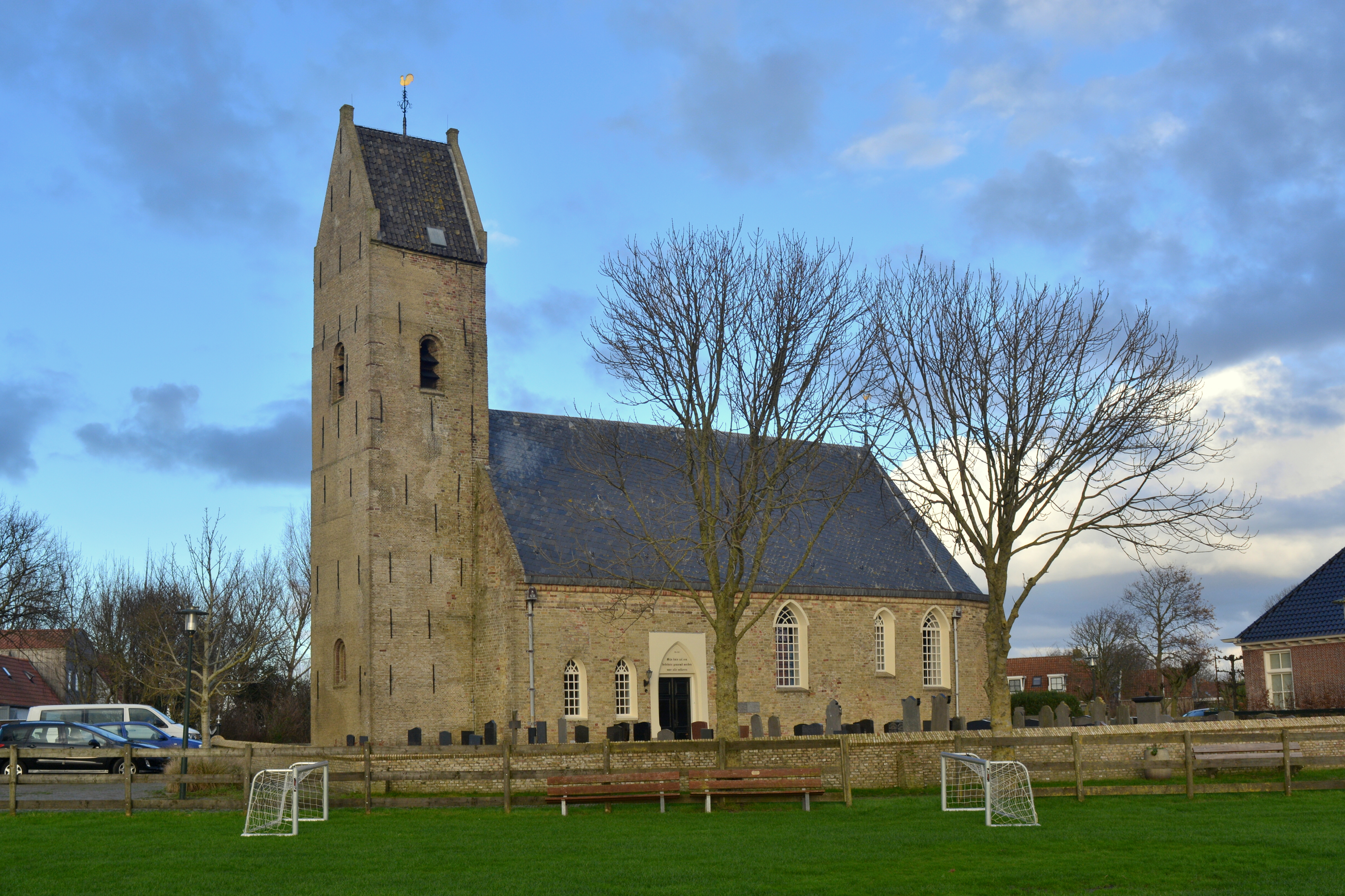
- Schraard church

- Flag Coat of arms

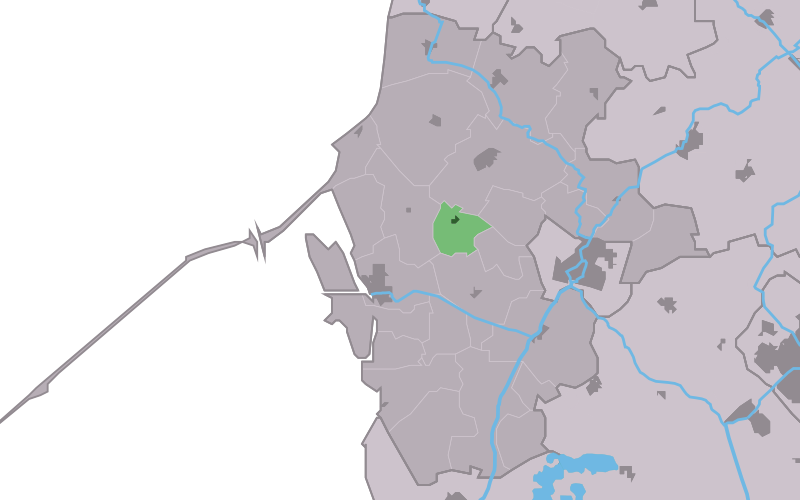
- Location in the former Wûnseradiel municipality

- Location in the Netherlands Schraard (Netherlands)
- Country: Netherlands
- Province: Friesland
- Municipality: Súdwest-Fryslân

Area
  - Total: 3.12 km^{2} (1.20 sq mi)
- Elevation: 0.1 m (0.33 ft)

Population (2021)
  - Total: 150
  - Density: 48/km^{2} (120/sq mi)
- Time zone: UTC+1 (CET)
  - Summer (DST): UTC+2 (CEST)
- Postal code: 8746
- Dialing code: 0517

Schraard (West Frisian: Skraard) is a village in Súdwest-Fryslân in the province of Friesland, the Netherlands. It had a population of around 165 in January 2017.

== History ==
The village was first mentioned in the 13th century as Scadawerth, and means "cut-off parcel" and "terp". Schraard is a terp (artificial living hill) village on the former Marnesleek. It was a near perfect radial structure, however the buildings are somewhat random, and the church is not in the middle, but on the southern edge.

The church dates from the 13th century, however the tower is from the 12th century. The church used to be a site of pilgrimage before the Reformation.

Schraard was home to 252 people in 1840. Before 2011, the village was part of the Wûnseradiel municipality.

== Gallery ==
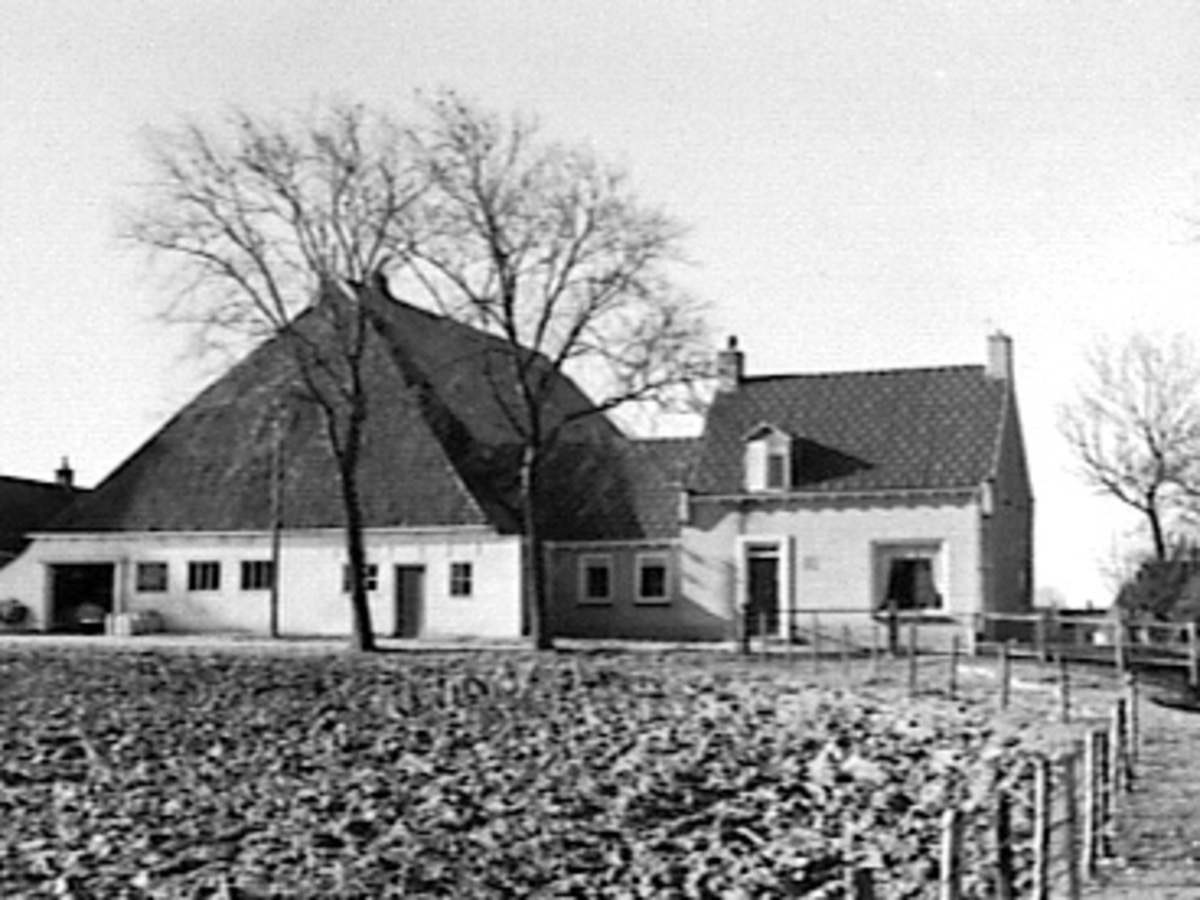
Farm in Schraard

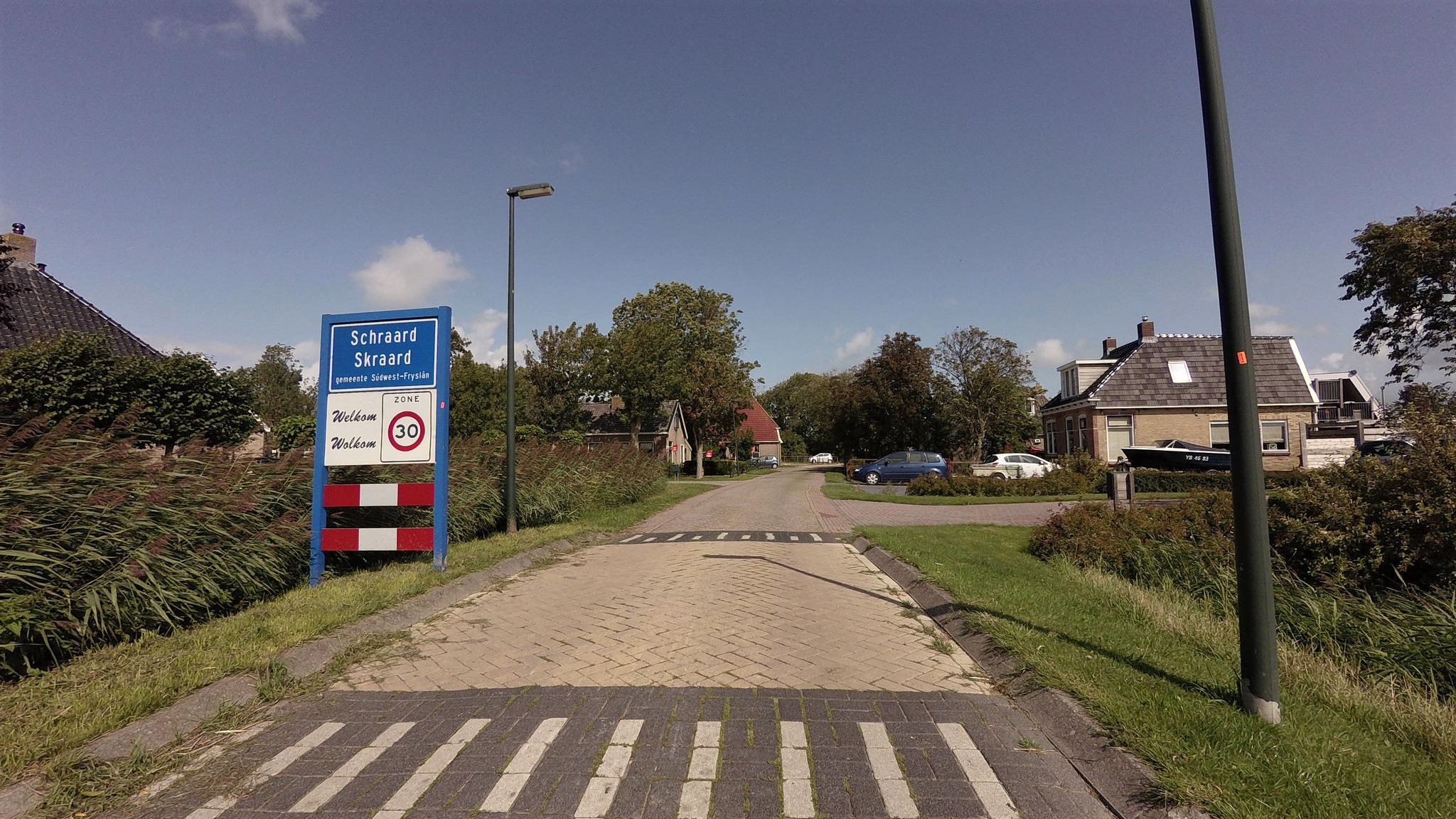
Welcome to Schraard
