= Wons =

Wons Wûns
- Village
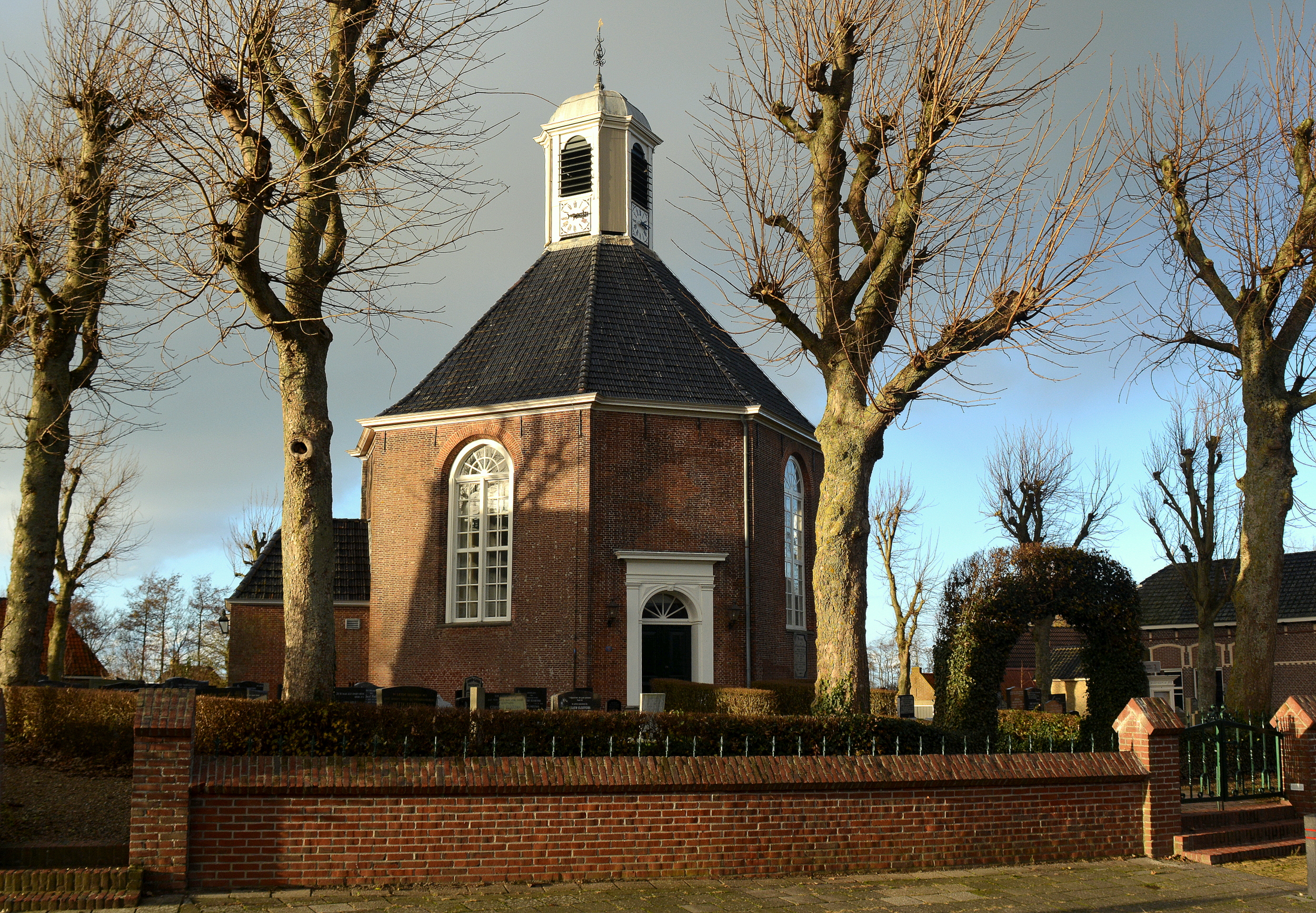
- Wons Church

- Flag Coat of arms

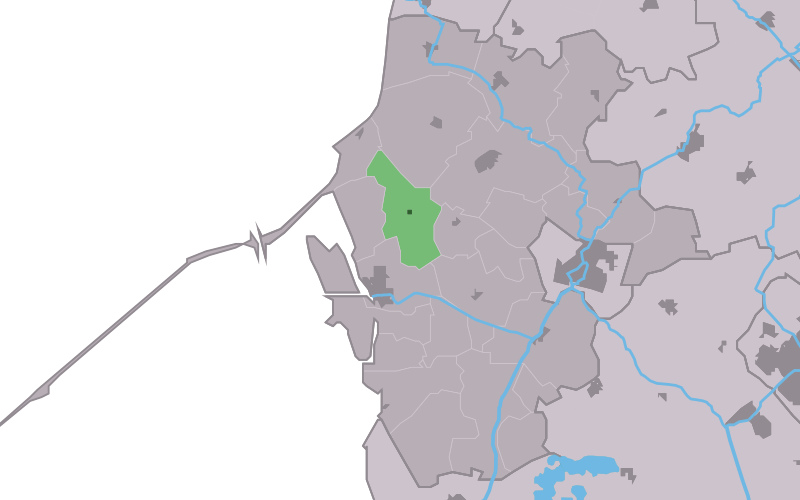
- Location in the former Wûnseradiel municipality

- Location in the Netherlands Wons (Netherlands)
- Country: Netherlands
- Province: Friesland
- Municipality: Súdwest-Fryslân

Area
  - Total: 6.88 km^{2} (2.66 sq mi)
- Elevation: 0.4 m (1.3 ft)

Population (2021)
  - Total: 285
  - Density: 41.4/km^{2} (107/sq mi)
- Time zone: UTC+1 (CET)
  - Summer (DST): UTC+2 (CEST)
- Postal code: 8747
- Dialing code: 0517

Wons (West Frisian: Wûns) is a village in Súdwest-Fryslân in the province of Friesland, the Netherlands. It had a population of around 290 in January 2017.

== History ==
The villages was first mentioned in 1270 as Wyldinghen, and means "settlement of Woldens (person)". Wons is a terp (artificial living hill) village with a grid structure. The terp was partially excavated. The former grietenij (predecessor of the municipality) Wûnseradiel was named after Wons, because it contained the court house.

The Dutch Reformed church is a domed church from 1728 which was built as the replacement of a 12th century predecessor. The tower was renewed in 1776.

Wons was home to 172 people in 1840. In May 1940, Wons was the scene of fighting as a prelude to the Battle of the Afsluitdijk. The village was located in the first line of defence. 17 Dutch soldiers and one civilian were killed. The line of defence only delayed the German advance for one day and was abandoned when the only canon ran out of ammunition. Nevertheless it allowed the Dutch army to retreat to Holland. The Germans were held back at Kornwerderzand on the Afsluitdijk which was never conquered.

Before 2011, the village was part of the Wûnseradiel municipality.

== Gallery ==
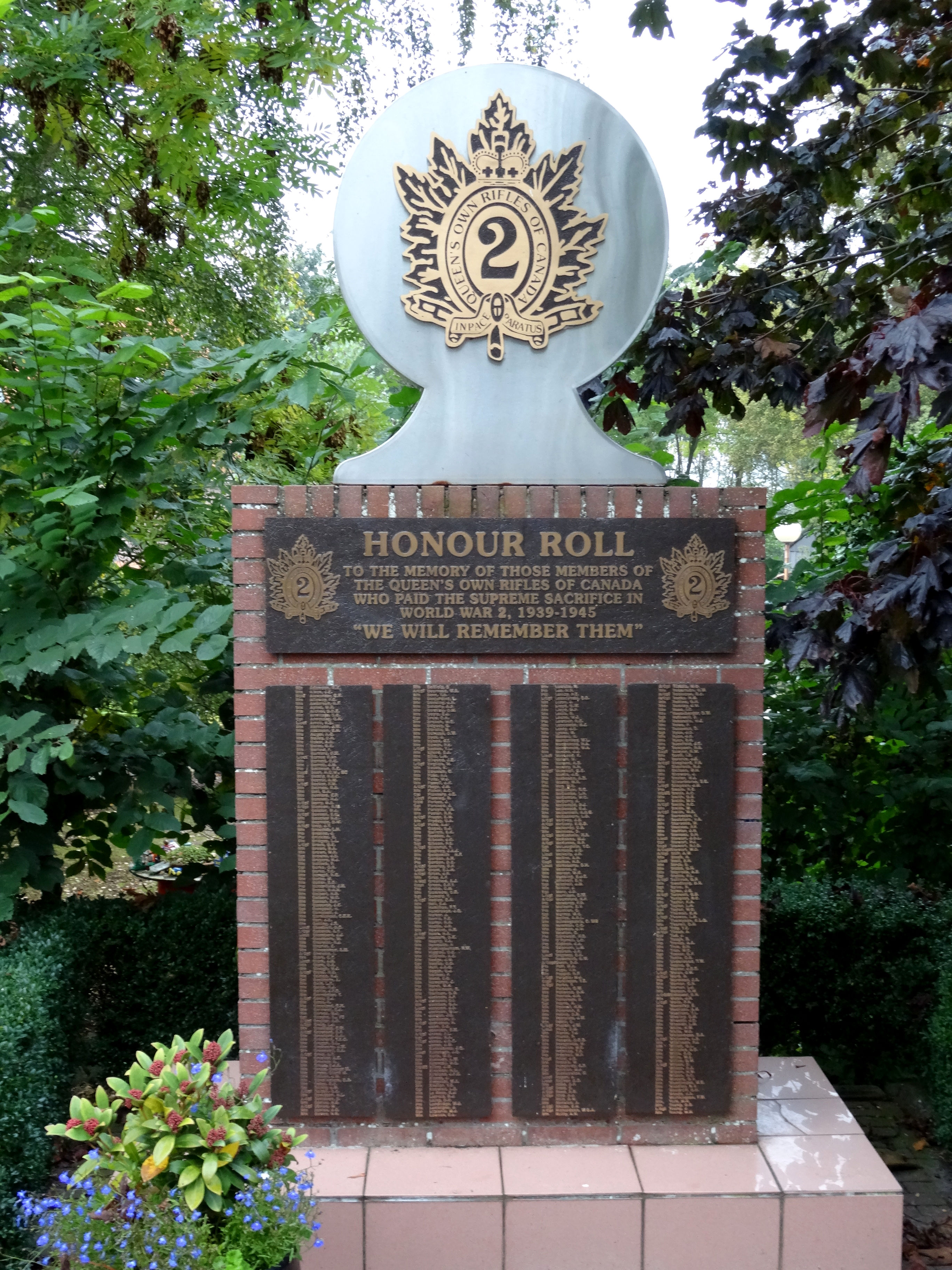
World War II monument

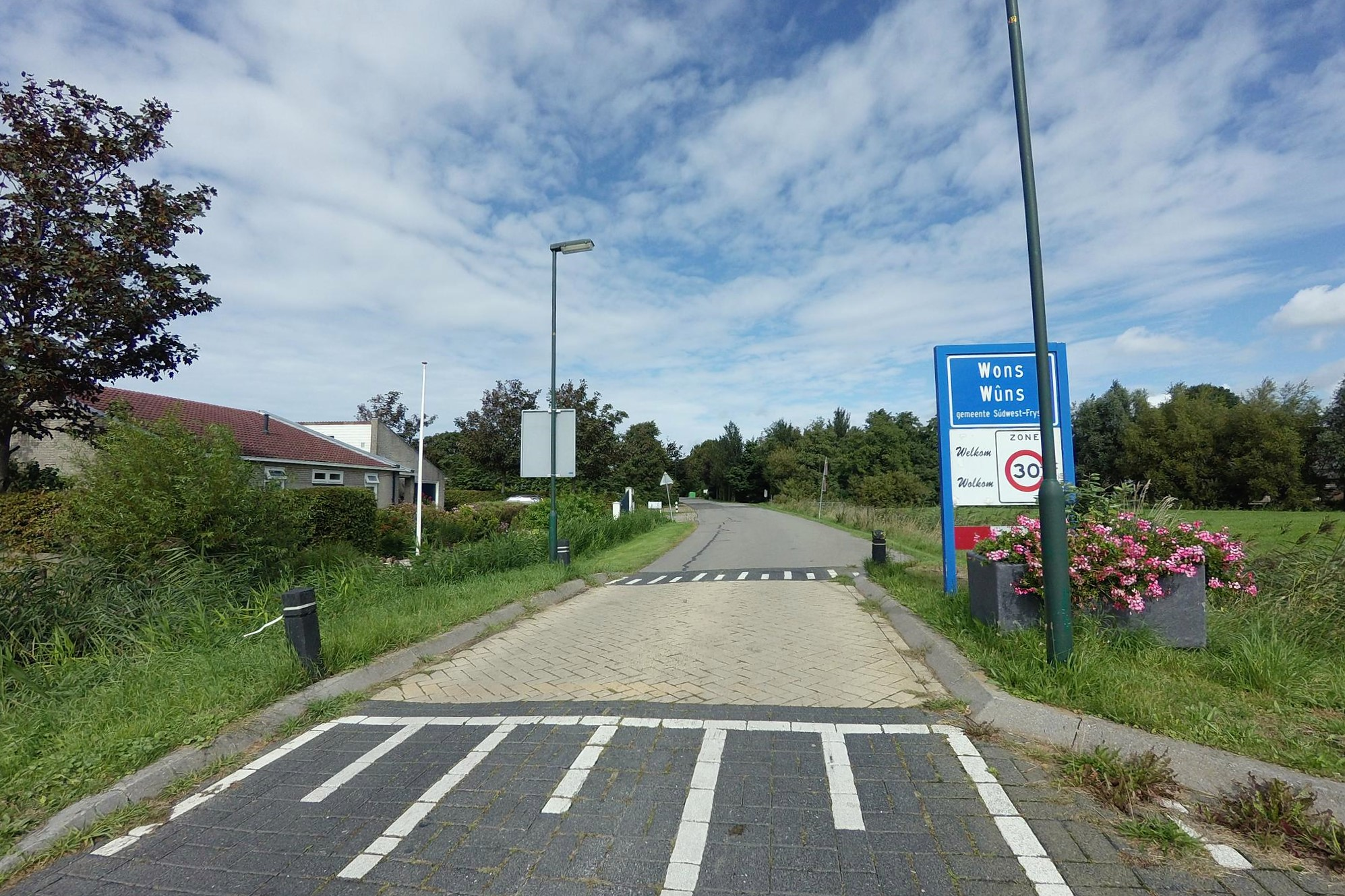
Welcome to Wons
