= Allingawier =

- Village
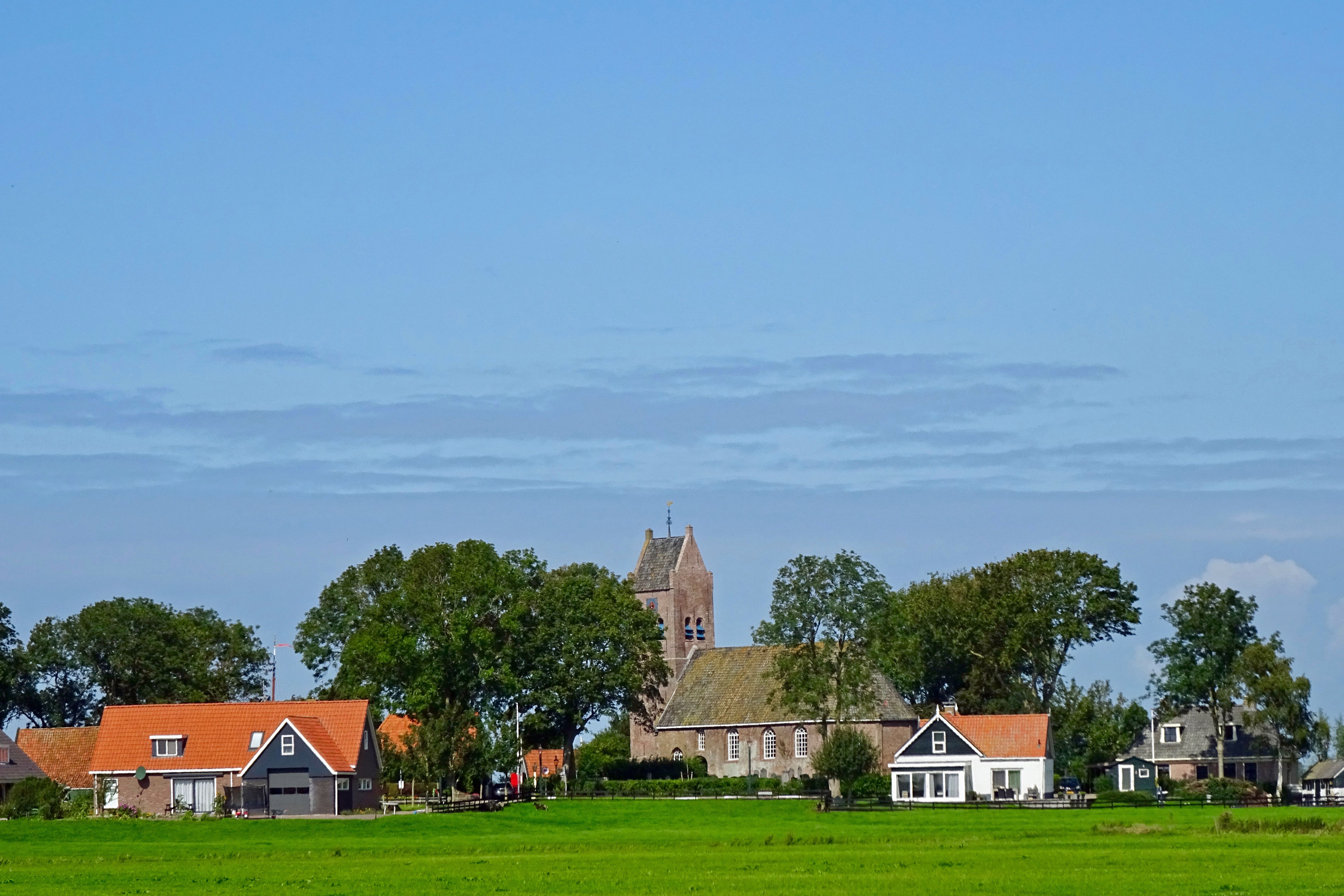
- View on Allingawier

- Flag Coat of arms

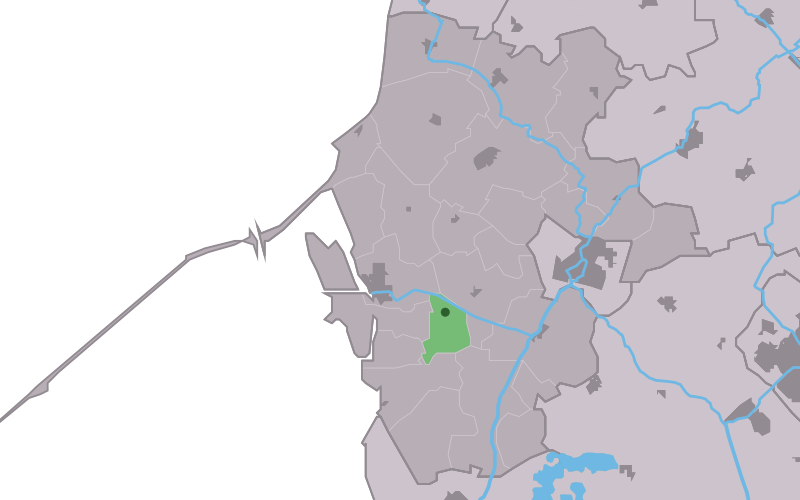
- Location in the former Wûnseradiel municipality

- Location in the Netherlands Allingawier (Netherlands)
- Country: Netherlands
- Province: Friesland
- Municipality: Súdwest-Fryslân

Area
  - Total: 3.36 km^{2} (1.30 sq mi)
- Elevation: −0.3 m (−0.98 ft)

Population (2021)
  - Total: 75
  - Density: 22/km^{2} (58/sq mi)
- Time zone: UTC+1 (CET)
  - Summer (DST): UTC+2 (CEST)
- Postal code: 8758
- Dialing code: 0515

Allingawier is a small village in Súdwest-Fryslân municipality in the Dutch province of Friesland. It is about 7 km southwest of the city of Bolsward.

Allingawier is a terp village, on an artificial dwelling mound. It had a population of around 80 in January 2017.

== History ==
The village was first mentioned around 1275 as Alingwere, and means "settlement of the people of Ale (person)". Allingawier was a terp (artificial living hill) village which was located on a ridge between lakes and pools. It was originally a fishing village.

Allingawiere already had a church before 1000. In 1634, the church was replaced by a chapel with a new tower. In 1839, after the Doleantie (schism in the Dutch Reformed Church), the Reformed community built a little church which now serves as visitor centre for the Aldfaers Erf Route.

Allingawier was home to 114 people in 1840. Between 1876 and 1879, the lakes Makkumermeer and Parregastermeer were poldered, and a canal was dug from Makkum to Tjerkwerd.

In 1973, the Allinga State was built to resemble a 16th-century stins (manor house) with a tower with bells. It was in use as a bed and breakfast, but in 2021, it was for sale. The estate was named after a 14th-century stins located a terp which was replaced in 1873 by a farm and a workman's house.

Before 2011, the village was part of the Wûnseradiel municipality.

== Gallery ==
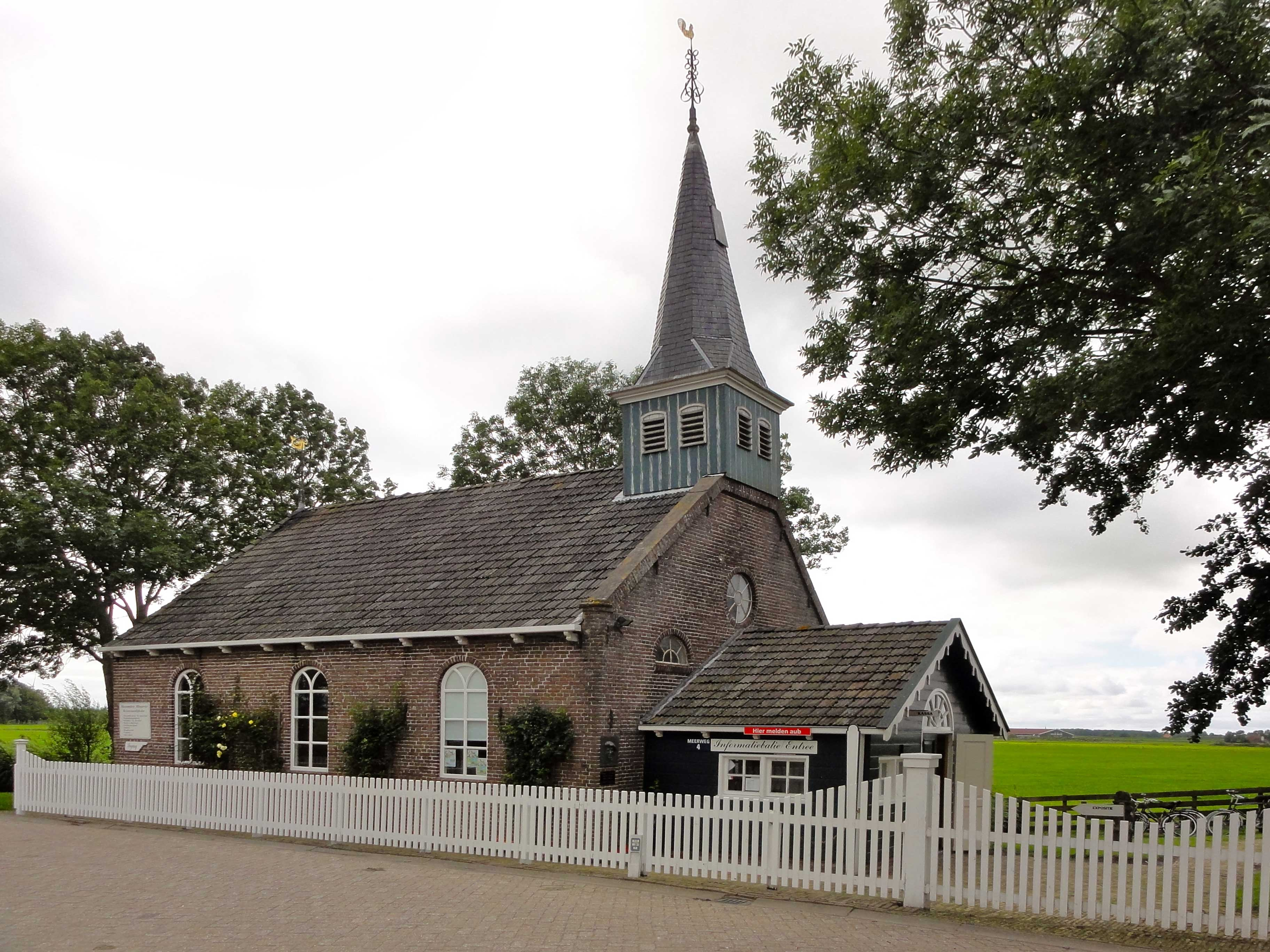
Church of Allingawier

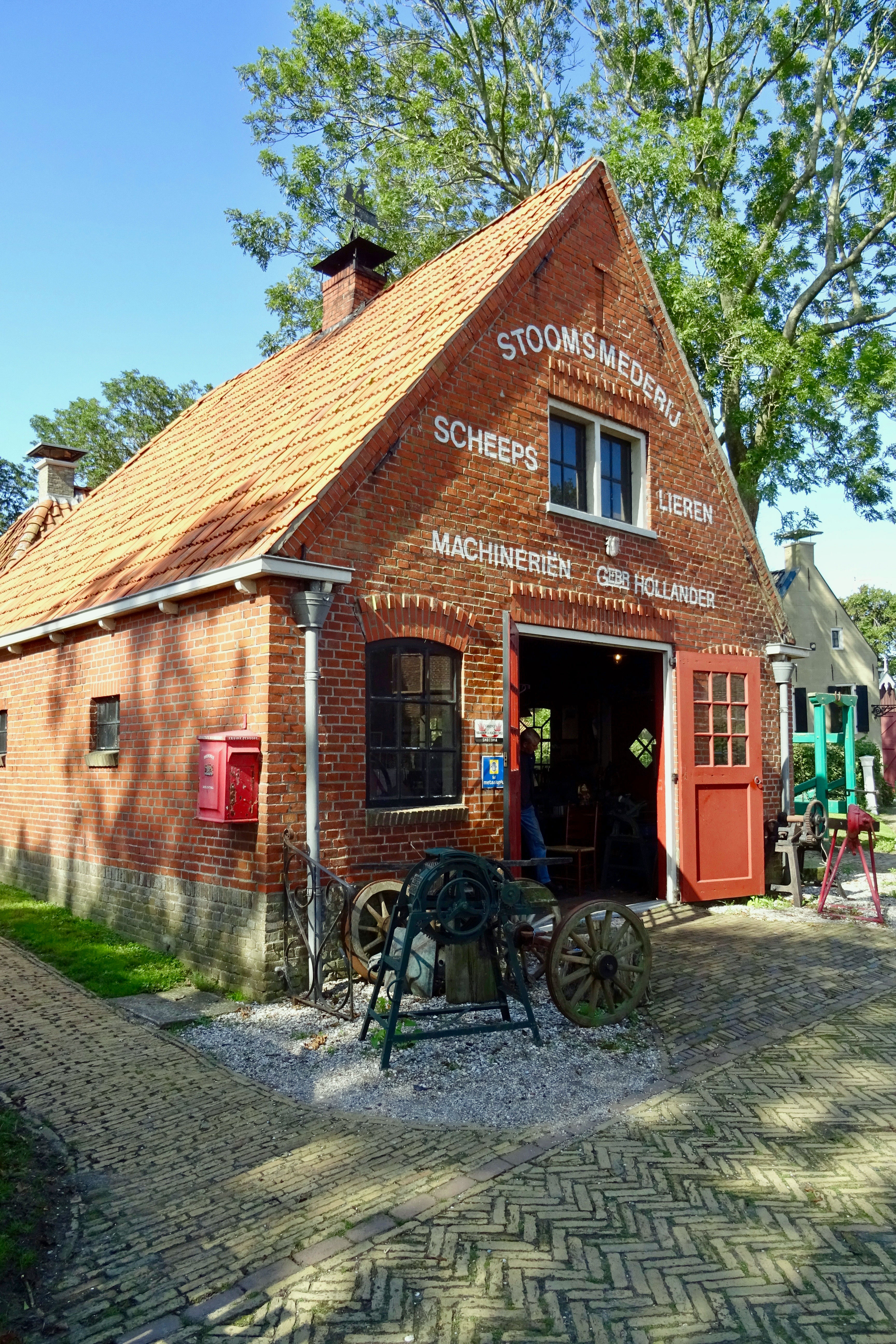
Former forge

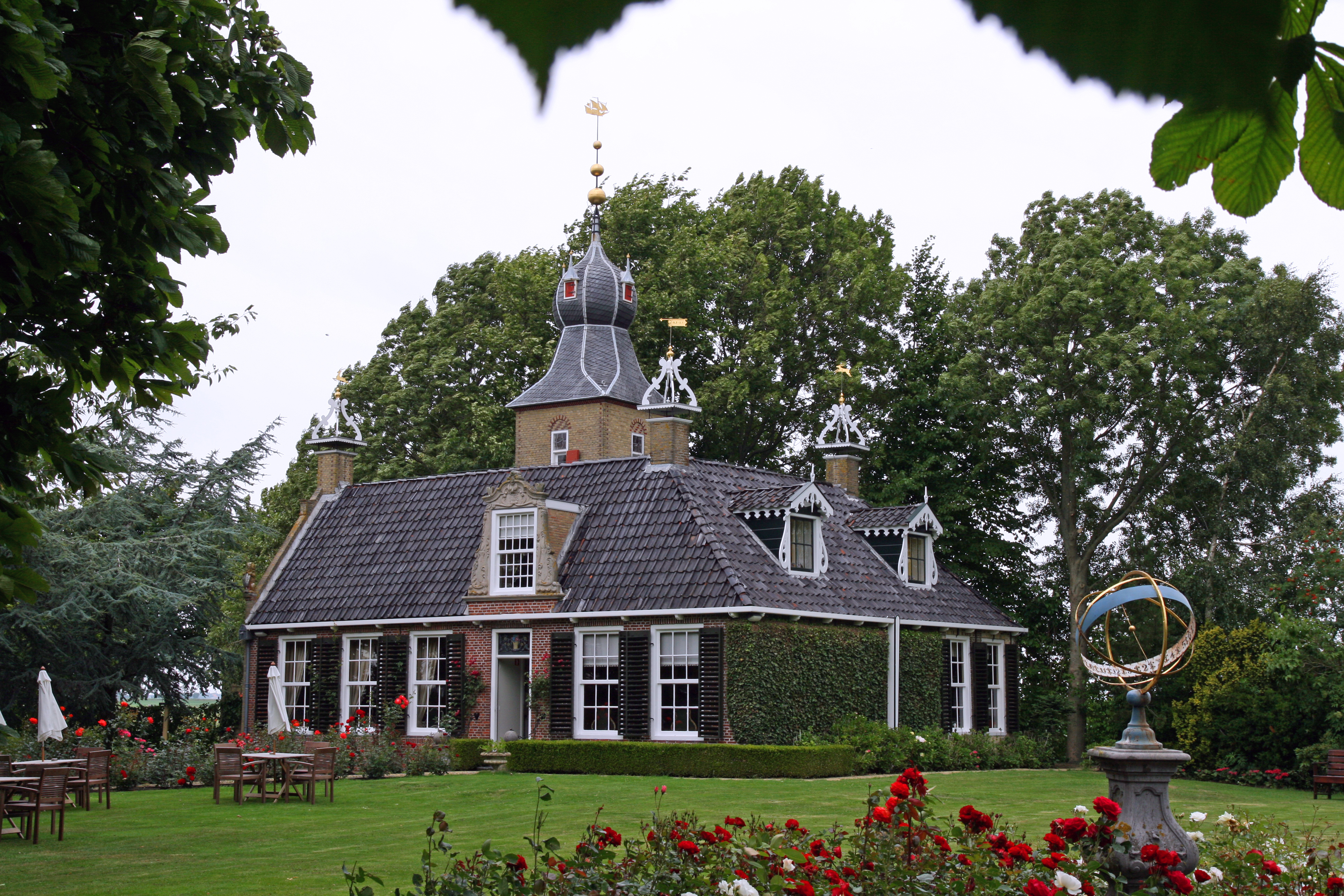
Mansion Allingastate

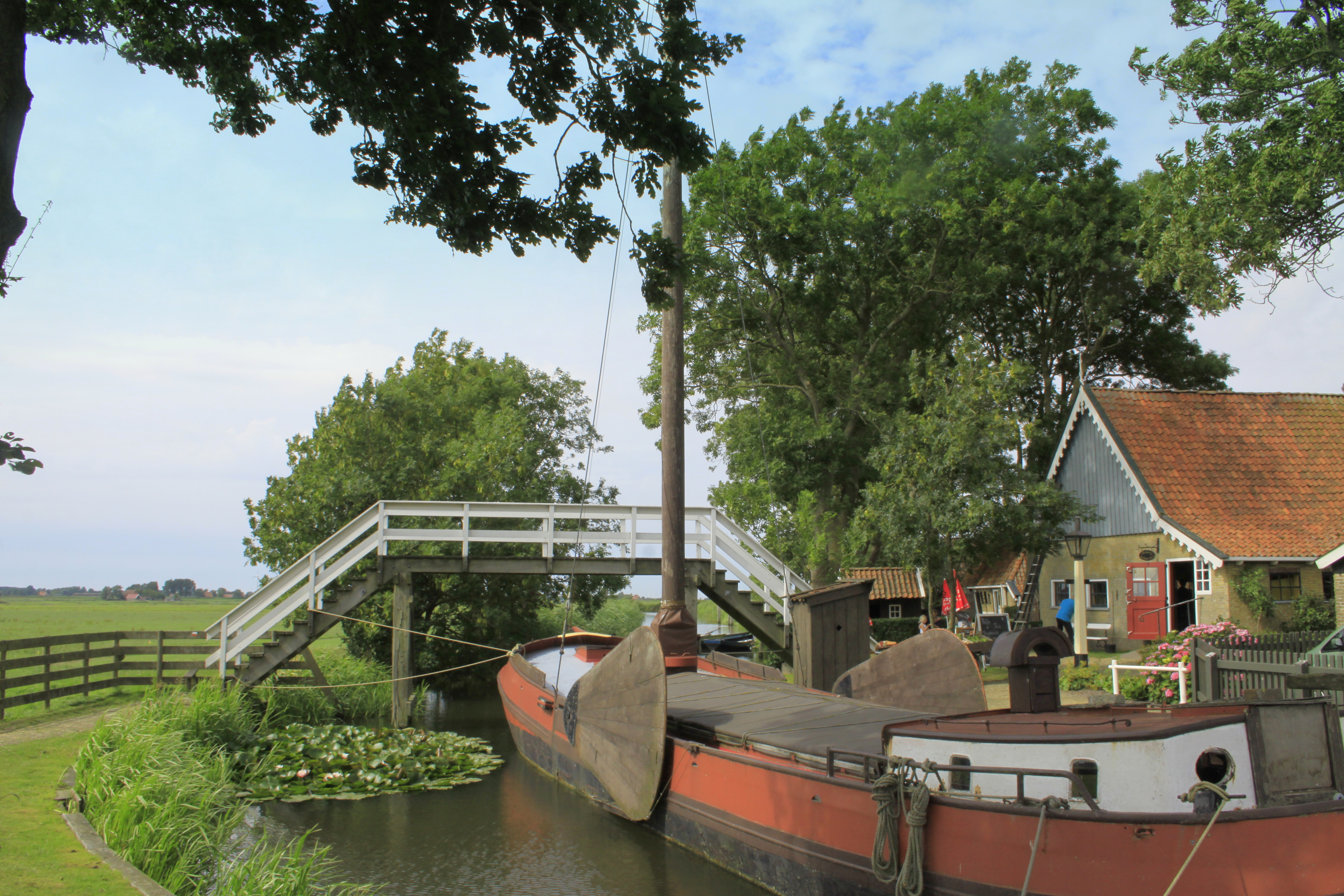
Canal view
