= List of windmills in Friesland (N–P) =

List of windmills in Friesland, Netherlands

A list of windmills in the Dutch province of Friesland, locations beginning N-P.

== N ==
Location	Name of mill Coordinates	Type	Built	Notes	Photograph
Nes	53°26′51″N 5°46′28″E	Standerdmolen	1629	Blown down 1833.	
Nes	De Hoop; 53°26′51″N 5°46′28″E	Stellingmolen	1834	Burnt down 1880.	
Nes	De Phoenix; 53°26′51″N 5°46′28″E	Grondzeiler	1880		
Nes	De Eendracht; Molen van Turkstra; 53°23′42″N 6°02′48″E	Stellingmolen	1872	Demolished 1976.	
Nes	Korenmolen van Nes; 53°23′39″N 6°03′17″E	Standerdmolen	Before 1580	Blown down 1724.	
Nes	Molen van Osinga; 53°23′39″N 6°03′17″E	Stellingmolen	1725	Burnt down 1891.	
Nes	Mosterdmolen; 53.°N 6.°E		Before 1812		
Nes	Peldegarstmolen; 53°26′41″N 5°46′13″E	Grondzeiler	Before 1665	Demolished 1761.	
Nes	Polder 95; 53°04′48″N 5°51′40″E	Spinnenkopmolen	Before 1832	Demolished post-1930.	
Nes	Polder 97; 53°04′56″N 5°51′51″E	Spinnenkopmolen	Before 1832	Demolished post-1930.	
Nes	Polder 274; 53°04′42″N 5°50′41″E	Spinnenkopmolen	Before 1832	Demolished before 1924.	
Nes	Polder 275; 53°04′23″N 5°50′27″E	Spinnenkopmolen	Before 1832	Demolished before 1924.	
Nes	Polder 277; 53°04′05″N 5°50′39″E	Spinnenkopmolen	Before 1832	Demolished before 1924.	
Nes	Polder 278; 53°04′47″N 5°51′22″E	Tjasker	Before 1832	Demolished before 1924.	
Nes	Polder 278a 53°04′45″N 5°51′21″E		Before 1832	Demolished post-1850.	
Nes	Polder 279; 53.°N 5.°E	Spinnenkopmolen	Before 1832	Demolished before 1924.	
Nes	Polder 280; 53°04′09″N 5°50′46″E	Spinnenkopmolen	Before 1832	Demolished before 1924.	
Nes	Polder 281; 53°04′18″N 5°51′14″E	Spinnenkopmolen	Before 1832	Demolished before 1924.	
Nes	Polder 282; 53°03′50″N 5°50′35″E		Before 1832	Demolished before 1924.	
Nes	Polder 283; 53°03′16″N 5°51′03″E	Spinnenkopmolen	Before 1832	Demolished before 1924.	
Nes	Polder 284; 53°03′07″N 5°50′33″E	Tjasker	Before 1832	Demolished before 1924.	
Nes	Polder 320; 53°03′26″N 5°51′08″E	Tjasker	Before 1832	Demolished before 1924.	
Nes	Polder 321; 53°04′21″N 5°52′12″E	Spinnenkopmolen	Before 1832	Demolished post-1850.	
Nes	Polder 322; 53°04′12″N 5°52′15″E	Spinnenkopmolen	Before 1832	Demolished post-1850.	
Nes	Polder 323; 53°04′07″N 5°52′27″E		1832	Demolished post-1850.	
Nes	Polder 324; 53°03′58″N 5°52′28″E	Tjasker	Before 1832	Demolished post-1850.	
Nes	Polder 325; 53°04′21″N 5°52′39″E		Before 1832	Demolished post-1930.	
Nes	Polder 327; 53°04′15″N 5°52′36″E		Before 1832	Demolished post-1930.	
Nes	Polder 328; 53°04′13″N 5°52′39″E		Before 1832	Demolished post-1930.	
Nes	Polder 329; 53°04′01″N 5°52′35″E		Before 1832	Demolished post-1930.	
Nes	Polder 330; Molen van Nijdam; Molen van Peenstra; Molen Le Signeur; 53°03′49″N 5°52′45″E	Spinnenkopmolen	Before 1649	Demolished 1927.	
Nes		Standerdmolen	Before 1580	Blown down 1724.	
Nes		Standerdmolen	Before 1502	Burnt down 1517.	
Nes	53°04′50″N 5°51′02″E	Tjasker	Before 1832		
Nieuwebildtzijl	Molen van Jr. P. E. A. Vegelin; 53°18′58″N 5°43′21″E	Spinnenkopmolen	Before 1832	Demolished post-1850.	
Nieuwebrug	Molen van Martinus van Idema; 52°59′32″N 5°53′06″E		Before 1832	Demolished before 1850.	
Nieuwehorne	Nijehorster Molen; 52°56′56″N 6°03′55″E	Standerdmolen	Before 1659	Demolished post-1747.	
Nieuweschoot	Polder 30; 52°56′30″N 5°54′53″E	Spinnenkopmolen	Between 1887 and 1897	Demolished post-1925.	
Nieuweschoot	Polder 31; 52°56′20″N 5°54′58″E	Spinnenkopmolen	Between 1887 and 1897	Demolished c.1930.	
Nij Beets	Paaltjasker It Damshûs; 53°04′12″N 5°59′51″E	Paaltjasker	2002		
Nij Beets	Molen van Frans van Lynden; 53°03′52″N 5°56′30″E	Spinnenkopmolen	Before 1832	Demolished before 1850.	
Nij Beets	Molen van Jeen Koopmans; 53°04′17″N 5°57′36″E	Grondzeiler		Demolished c.1928.	
Nij Beets	Moolen van Sijbren Nijdam; 53°04′08″N 5°55′57″E	Spinnenkopmolen	Before 1832	Demolished before 1850.	
Nij Beets	Polder 337; 53°04′11″N 5°56′04″E	Spinnenkopmolen	1850	Demolished post-1937.	
Nij Beets	Polder 338; 53°03′51″N 5°56′23″E	Grondzeiler	1908	Demolished 1953.	
Nij Beets	Polder 339; 53°04′19″N 5°58′43″E		Before 1876	Demolished between 1924 and 1937.	
Nij Beets	Polder 340; 53°04′28″N 5°59′27″E		Before 1876	Demolished between 1924 and 1937.	
Nij Beets	Polder 341; 53°04′18″N 5°59′54″E	Spinnenkopmolen	Before 1876	Demolished before 1924.	
Nij Beets	Polder 342; 53°04′22″N 0°00′01″E		Before 1876	Demolished before 1924.	
Nij Beets	Polder 343; 53°04′46″N 5°59′16″E	Spinnenkopmolen	Before 1876	Demolished before 1924.	
Nij Beets	Polder 344; 53°04′48″N 5°59′32″E		Before 1876	Demolished before 1924.	
Nij Beets	Polder 345; 53°04′45″N 5°59′45″E		Before 1876	Demolished before 1924.	
Nij Beets	Polder 346; 53°04′05″N 5°59′04″E		Before 1876	Demolished before 1924.	
Nij Beets	Polder 347; 53°04′03″N 5°59′38″E		Before 1876	Demolished before 1924.	
Nij Beets	Polder 348; 53°03′48″N 5°58′57″E		Before 1876	Demolished before 1924.	
Nij Beets	Polder 349; 53°03′26″N 5°59′39″E		Before 1876	Demolished before 1924.	
Nij Beets	Polder 350; 53°03′24″N 5°59′41″E		Before 1876	Demolished before 1924.	
Nij Beets	Polder 351; 53°03′24″N 5°59′51″E		Before 1876	Demolished before 1924.	
Nij Beets	Polder 352; 53°04′42″N 6°00′38″E		Before 1876	Demolished before 1924.	
Nij Beets	Polder 353; 53°04′40″N 6°00′43″E		Before 1876	Demolished before 1924.	
Nij Beets	Polder 354; 53°04′35″N 6°00′59″E		Before 1872	Demolished before 1924.	
Nij Beets	Polder 354a 53°04′21″N 6°00′46″E		Before 1876	Demolished before 1924.	
Nij Beets	Polder 345b 53°04′18″N 6°00′41″E		Before 1876	Demolished before 1924.	
Nij Beets	Polder 355; 53°04′25″N 6°02′07″E		Before 1876	Demolished before 1924.	
Nij Beets	Polder 355a 53°04′00″N 6°01′35″E		Before 1876	Demolished before 1924.	
Nij Beets	Polder 356; 53°03′28″N 6°00′11″E		Before 1876	Demolished before 1924.	
Nij Beets	Polder 357; 53°03′21″N 6°00′21″E		Before 1876	Demolished before 1924.	
Nij Beets	Polder 358; 53°03′17″N 6°00′48″E	Grondzeiler	Before 1876	Demolished before 1924.	
Nij Beets	Polder 359; 53°03′18″N 6°01′00″E		Before 1876	Demolished before 1924.	
Nij Beets	Polder 359a 53°03′13″N 6°00′58″E		Before 1876	Demolished before 1924.	
Nijega	Polder 202; 53°08′57″N 6°00′40″E		1876	Demolished before 1924.	
Nijehaske	Groote Sint Johannesgaster Veenpolder; De Vooruitgang; Dorpzigt; Nr. 2; 52°57′20″N 5°54′20″E	Grondzeiler	1860	Demolished 1933.	
Nijehaske	Groote Sint Johannesgaster Veenpolder; Veenzigt; 52°57′14″N 5°54′16″E	Grondzeiler	1860	Demolished 1933.	
Nijehaske	Molen van Dirk Wiersma; 52°57′33″N 5°53′53″E		Before 1832	Demolished post-1850.	
Nijehaske	Molen van Petrus Metz; 53°58′59″N 5°52′00″E	Spinnenkopmolen	Before 1832	Demolished before 1850.	
Nijehaske	Molen van Roelof Pool; 53°57′40″N 5°53′09″E	Spinnenkopmolen	Before 1832	Demolished before 1850.	
Nijehaske	Polder 17a 53°57′58″N 5°53′13″E	Weidemolen			
Nijehaske	Polder 17b 53°57′41″N 5°53′09″E	Spinnenkopmolen	Before 1832	Demolished before 1850.	
Nijeholtpade	Polder 1; 52°55′12″N 6°04′54″E		Before 1877	Demolished before 1922.	
Nijeholtpade	Polder 2; 52°54′38″N 6°06′15″E		Before 1877	Demolished 1922.	
Nijeholtpade	Polder 3; 52°54′35″N 6°06′08″E		Before 1877	Demolished before 1922.	
Nijeholtpade	Polder 4; 52°54′29″N 6°05′55″E		Before 1877	Demolished before 1922.	
Nijeholtpade	Polder 4a 52°54′10″N 6°05′04″E		1873	Demolished before 1922.	
Nijeholtpade	Polder 107; 52°55′06″N 6°02′54″E		Before 1877	Demolished before 1922.	
Nijeholtpade	Polder 108; 52°55′05″N 6°03′01″E		Before 1877	Demolished before 1922.	
Nijeholtpade	Polder 109; 52°55′20″N 6°03′32″E		Before 1877	Demolished before 1922.	
Nijeholtpade	Polder 110; 52°55′27″N 6°03′45″E		Before 1877	Demolished before 1922.	
Nijeholtpade	Polder 111; 52°55′19″N 6°04′20″E		Before 1877	Demolished before 1922.	
Nijeholtpade	Polder 123a 52°55′16″N 6°03′20″E		Before 1877	Demolished before 1922.	
Nijeholtpade	Polder 123b 52°55′07″N 6°03′10″E		Before 1877	Demolished before 1922.	
Nijeholtpade	Polder 123d 52°55′04″N 6°02′42″E		Before 1877	Demolished before 1922.	
Nijeholtpade	Polder 124; 52°55′23″N 6°03′34″E		Before 1877	Demolished before 1922.	
Nijeholtwolde	Molen van de Kerk van Nijeholtwolde; 52°54′21″N 5°59′42″E	Spinnenkopmolen	Before 1832	Demolished before 1850.	
Nijeholtwolde	Molen van Nicolaas van Heloma; 52°54′27″N 5°58′44″E	Spinnenkopmolen	Before 1832	Demolished before 1850.	
Nijeholtwolde	Molen van Pieter Tip; 52°53′38″N 5°59′43″E		Before 1832	Demolished before 1850.	
Nijeholtwolde	Polder 88; 52°53′43″N 5°57′05″E	Spinnenkopmolen	Before 1832	Demolished post-1929.	
Nijeholtwolde	Polder 88a 52°54′05″N 5°56′56″E	Spinnenkopmolen	1877	Demolished before 1924.	
Nijeholtwolde	Polder 88b 52°53′44″N 5°56′12″E	Spinnenkopmolen	Before 1856	Demolished before 1877.	
Nijeholtwolde	Polder 89; 52°53′32″N 5°58′37″E	Spinnenkopmolen	Before 1832	Demolished post-1929.	
Nijeholtwolde	Polder 89a 52°53′47″N 5°57′48″E	Spinnenkopmolen	1873	Demolished before 1929.	
Nijeholtwolde	Polder 90; 52°53′36″N 5°58′53″E	Spinnenkopmolen	Before 1832	Demolished post-1929.	
Nijeholtwolde	Polder 91; 52°54′00″N 5°59′22″E	Spinnenkopmolen	Before 1832	Demolished post-1929.	
Nijeholtwolde	Polder 92; 52°54′13″N 5°59′34″E	Spinnenkopmolen	Before 1832	Demolished post-1929.	
Nijeholtwolde	Polder 93; 52°54′37″N 5°58′39″E	Spinnenkopmolen	Before 1832	Demolished post-1929.	
Nijeholtwolde	Polder 94; 52°54′56″N 5°56′34″E	Spinnenkopmolen	Before 1877	Demolished post-1929.	
Nijeholtwolde	Polder 95; 52°55′57″N 5°53′21″E		Before 1877	Demolished before 1929.	
Nijeholtwolde	Polder 96; 52°55′00″N 5°57′35″E		Before 1877	Demolished before 1929.	
Nijeholtwolde	Polder 97; 52°55′14″N 5°57′57″E		Before 1877	Demolished before 1929.	
Nijeholtwolde	Polder R 52°53′53″N 5°55′33″E	Grondzeiler	1877	Demolished before 1924.	
Nijelamer	Korenmolen van Nijelamer; 52°52′59″N 5°57′00″E	Standerdmolen	Before 1664	Demolished before 1718.	
Nijelamer	Molen van Gerrit Mulder; 52°53′38″N 5°55′57″E		Before 1832	Demolished before 1850.	
Nijelamer	Molen van Jan Birkenbos; 52°53′32″N 5°57′00″E		Before 1832	Demolished before 1805.	
Nijelamer	Polder 84; 52°52′55″N 5°56′36″E	Spinnenkopmolen	Before 1877	Demolished before 1924.	
Nijelamer	Polder 85; 52°53′04″N 5°56′55″E	Spinnenkopmolen	Before 1832	Demolished post-1929.	
Nijelamer	Polder 85a 52°53′24″N 5°55′45″E		Before 1832	Demolished 1929.	
Nijelamer	Polder 86; 52°53′04″N 5°57′06″E	Spinnenkopmolen	Before 1832	Demolished post-1929.	
Nijelamer	Polder 87; 52°53′23″N 5°57′39″E	Spinnenkopmolen	Before 1877	Demolished post-1929.	
Nijelamer		Weidemolen			
Nijemirdum	Huitebuurstermolen; 52°50′56″N 5°34′26″E	Grondzeiler	1790	Demolished 1898.	
Nijemirdum	Zwaantje; Huitebuurstermolen; 52°50′56″N 5°34′26″E	Grondzeiler	1893		
Nijemirdum	Korenmolen van Nijemirdum	Standerdmolen	Before 1570	Demolished before 1664.	
Nijetrijne	De Reiger; 52°51′09″N 5°55′07″E	Grondzeiler	1871		
Nijetrijne	De Rietvink; 52°51′16″N 5°54′44″E	Grondzeiler	1855		
Nijetrijne	De Bonne Brekken; 52°50′29″N 5°54′27″E	Boktjasker	2007		
Nijetrijne	Windmotor Nijetrijne (1)	Iron windpump		Molendatabase (in Dutch); De Hollandsche Molen (in Dutch)	
Nijetrijne	Windmotor Nijetrijne (2)	Iron windpump		Molendatabase (in Dutch); De Hollandsche Molen (in Dutch)	
Nijetrijne	Molen van Berend Dragt; 52°51′02″N 5°54′04″E		Before 1832	Demolished before 1850.	
Nijetrijne	Molen van Sjoerd Koopmans; 52°50′10″N 5°53′41″E		Before 1832	Demolished post-1850.	
Nijetrijne	Polder 60a 52°49′56″N 5°53′41″E	Spinnenkopmolen	1877	Demolished before 1929.	
Nijetrijne	Polder 61; 52°50′06″N 5°53′35″E		Before 1877	Demolished before 1929l.	
Nijetrijne	Polder 71; 52°50′58″N 5°54′01″E	Spinnenkopmolen	Before 1877	Demolished before 1929.	
Nijetrijne	Polder 75; 52°50′10″N 5°56′06″E		Before 1877	Demolished before 1929.	
Nijetrijne	Polder 75a 52°50′08″N 5°55′32″E		Before 1832	Demolished between 1850 and 1929.	
Nijetrijne	Polder 75b 52°49′53″N 5°55′17″E		1877	Demolished before 1929.	
Nijetrijne	Polder 75c 52°49′54″N 5°55′42″E	Tjasker	Before 1877	Demolished before 1932.	
Nijetrijne	Grote Veenpolder part n 52°51′03″N 5°54′24″E	Weidemolen	1877	Demolished before 1932.	
Nijetrijne	Groote Veenpolder part o 52°50′57″N 5°54′40″E	Weidemolen	1877	Demolished before 1932.	
Nijetrijne	Molen van Albert Oosterhof; 52°49′23″N 5°54′52″E		Before 1832	Demolished before 1850.	
Nijetrijne	Molen van Botte Koopmans; 52°49′23″N 5°54′44″E		Before 1832	Demolished before 1850.	
Nijetrijne	Molen van Dominicus Hartkamp; 52°50′28″N 5°53′51″E		Before 1832	Demolished before 1850.	
Nijetrijne	Molen van Nicolaas van Heloma; 52°50′48″N 5°55′27″E		Before 1832	Demolished before 1850.	
Nijetrijne	Polder De Rottige Meent; 52°55′56″N 5°53′57″E	Spinnenkopmolen	Before 1877	Demolished before 1929.	
Nijetrijne	52°49′58″N 5°54′10″E	Spinnenkopmolen		Demolished 1936.	
Nijewier	Molen van Niawier; 53.°N 5.°E		Before 1511		
Nijezijl	Polde r44 53°00′14″N 5°35′43″E	Spinnenkopmolen	Before 1832	Demolished before 1922.	
Nijezijl	Polder 45; 53°00′16″N 5°35′58″E	Spinnenkopmolen	Before 1832	Demolished 1929.	
Nijezijl	Polder 46; 53°00′21″N 5°36′20″E	Paaltjasker	Before 1873	Demolished c.1922.	
Nijhuizum	Spinnenkop Nijhuizen	Spinnenkopmolen	1832	Demolished 1930s.	
Nijhuizum	Nijhuizumermolen; Monnikenburenmolen; 52°59′11″N 5°29′22″E	Spinnenkopmolen	2008		
Nijhuizum	Molen van Douwe Bruinsma; 52°59′06″N 5°29′30″E	Spinnenkopmolen	Before 1832	Demolished post-1850.	
Nijhuizum	Molen van Rouke de Boer; 52°58′58″N 5°29′12″E	Spinnenkopmolen	Before 1832	Demolished before 1850.	
Nijhuizum	Polder 271; 52°59′04″N 5°29′39″E	Grondzeiler	1850	Demolished between 1945 and 1950.	
Nijhuizum	Polder 272; 52°58′54″N 5°29′16″E	Spinnenkopmolen	Before 1832	Demolished post-1930.	
Nijhuizum	Polder 273; 52°58′51″N 5°29′01″E	Grondzeiler	Before 1832	Demolished c.1932.	
Nijhuizum	Polder 274; 52°58′48″N 5°29′12″E	Spinnenkopmolen	Before 1832	Demolished post-1930.	
Nijhuizum	Polder 275; 52°58′32″N 5°29′06″E	Spinnenkopmolen	Before 1832	Demolished post-1932.	
Nijhuizum	Polder 276; 52°58′39″N 5°29′14″E	Spinnenkopmolen	Before 1832	Demolished post-1930.	
Nijland	Molen van E. Buma; 53°02′47″N 5°35′15″E	Spinnenkopmolen	Before 1832	Demolished before 1850.	
Nijland	Molen van Fieke Winia; 53°03′09″N 5°33′55″E	Spinnenkopmolen	Before 1832	Demolished before 1850.	
Nijland	Molen van Gerrit Jaarsma; 53°03′02″N 5°34′56″E	Spinnenkopmolen	Before 1832	Demolished post-1850.	
Nijland	Molen van Haaijo Bangsma; 53°02′49″N 5°33′10″E		Before 1832	Demolished before 1850.	
Nijland	Molen van het Weeshuis; 53°02′53″N 5°33′07″E		Before 1832	Demolished before 1850.	
Nijland	Molen van Pier Rolsma; 53°02′24″N 5°34′25″E	Spinnenkopmolen	Before 1832	Demolished before 1850.	
Nijland	Polder 7; 53°02′49″N 5°33′07″E	Spinnenkopmolen		Demolished before 1929.	
Nijland	Polder 8; 53°02′35″N 5°33′10″E	Spinnenkopmolen	Before 1832	Demolished before 1929.	
Nijland	Polder 66; 53°01′52″N 5°34′03″E		Before 1832	Demolished before 1929.	
Nijland	Polder 67; 53°02′03″N 5°33′46″E	Spinnenkopmolen	Before 1832	Demolished post-1930.	
Nijland	Polder 68; 53°02′07″N 5°33′24″E	Grondzeiler	Before 1832	Demolished before 1929.	
Nijland	Polder 69; 53°02′30″N 5°33′02″E	Spinnenkopmolen	Before 1832	Demolished before 1929.	
Nijland	Polder 70; 53°02′44″N 5°34′16″E	Spinnenkopmolen	Before 1832	Demolished post-1930.	
Nijland	Polder 71; 53°02′35″N 5°34′35″E	Spinnenkopmolen	Before 1832	Demolished before 1929.	
Nijland	Polder 72; 53°02′27″N 5°34′32″E	Spinnenkopmolen	Before 1873	Demolished post-1929.	
Nijland	Polder 76; 53°02′53″N 5°34′39″E	Spinnenkopmolen	Before 1832	Demolished post-1850.	
Nijland	Polder 79; 53°02′45″N 5°35′42″E	Spinnenkopmolen	Before 1832	Demolished before 1928.	
Nijland	Polder 230; Polder 315; 53°03′18″N 5°35′01″E	Spinnenkopmolen	Before 1832	Demolished post-1930.	
Nijland	Polder 306; 53°03′06″N 5°36′10″E	Spinnenkopmolen	Before 1932	Demolished post-1930.	
Nijland	Polder 306a 53°02′52″N 5°36′03″E		Before 1832	Demolished before 1850.	
Nijland	Polder 307; 53°02′50″N 5°35′37″E	Spinnenkopmolen	Before 1873	Demolished post-1931.	
Nijland	Polder 308; 53°02′59″N 5°35′52″E		Before 1873	Demolished before 1929.	
Nijland	Polder 308a 53°03′07″N 5°35′31″E	Spinnenkopmolen	Before 1832	Demolished post-1928.	
Nijland	Polder 309; 53°02′59″N 5°34′45″E	Spinnenkopmolen	Before 1832	Demolished before 1929.	
Nijland	Polder 310; 53°03′03″N 5°33′52″E	Spinnenkopmolen	Before 1832	Demolished post-1930.	
Nijland	Polder 313; 53°03′08″N 5°34′26″E	Spinnenkopmolen	Before 1832	Demolished before 1874.	
Nijland	Polder 316; 53°03′34″N 5°35′57″E	Spinnenkopmolen	Before 1832	Demolished post-1930.	
Nijland	Polder 317; 53°03′21″N 5°35′59″E	Grondzeiler	Before 1832	Demolished post-1930.	
Nijland	Polder 317a 53°03′24″N 5°36′10″E		Before 1850	Demolished post-1930.	
Nijland	Polder 383; 53°04′00″N 5°35′27″E	Spinnenkopmolen	Before 1832	Demolished post-1930.	
Nijland	Polder 383a 53°03′54″N 5°35′57″E	Spinnenkopmolen	Before 1832	Demolished post-1850.	
Nijland	Polder 402; 53°03′23″N 5°34′00″E	Spinnenkopmolen	Before 1832	Demolished 1951.	
Nijland	Polder 403; 53°03′13″N 5°33′53″E	Spinnenkopmolen	Before 1832	Demolished post-1948.	
Nijland	Polder 404; 53°02′58″N 5°33′28″E	Spinnenkopmolen	Before 1832	Demolished post-1930.	
Nijland	53°03′05″N 5°35′48″E		Before 1931	Demolished before 1951.	
Noardbergum	Molen van Kuikhorne; 53°14′26″N 6°01′08″E	Standerdmolen	Before 1664	Demolished before 1728.	
Noordwolde	Windlust; 52°53′31″N 6°08′31″E	Stellingmolen	1859		
Noordwolde	Molen van Menger; 52°53′21″N 6°08′09″E	Grondzeiler	1835	Moved to Wolvega 1917.	
Noordwolde	Noortwolder Molen; 52°52′58″N 6°07′53″E	Standerdmolen	Before 1543	Blown down 1833.	
Noordwolde			1741	Demolished 1819.	
Noordwolde	Molen van Albert Bovenkamp; 52°52′45″N 6°06′17″E	Spinnenkopmolen	Before 1832	Demolished before 1850.	

== O ==
Location	Name of mill Coordinates	Type	Built	Notes	Photograph
Oentsjerk	Kleine Polder Unia; 53°15′21″N 5°53′33″E		Before 1832	Demolished post-1850.	
Oentsjerk	Molen van Hector van Sminia; 53°14′59″N 5°53′23″E		Before 1832	Demolished before 1850.	
Oentsjerk	Molen van Willem Sminia; 53°15′26″N 5°52′26″E		Before 1832	Demolished before 1850.	
Oentsjerk	53°15′08″N 5°53′14″E	Weidemolen	Between 1850 and 1874	Demolished before 1930.	
Oentsjerk	Trijnwouden; 53°15′16″N 5°53′02″E	Weidemolen	Between 1832 and 1850	Demolished before 1874.	
Oentsjerk	Trijnwouden; 53°14′53″N 5°53′06″E	Weidemolen	Between 1832 and 1850	Demolished before 1874.	
Oentsjerk	Trijnwouden; 53°15′10″N 5°53′03″E	Weidemolen	Between 1832 and 1850	Demolished before 1874.	
Oentsjerk	Trijnwouden; 53°15′13″N 5°53′03″E	Weidemolen	Between 1832 and 1850	Demolished before 1874.	
Oentsjerk	Trijnwouden; 53°15′08″N 5°53′24″E	Weidemolen	Between 1832 and 1850	Demolished before 1874.	
Oentsjerk	Trijnwouden; 53°15′20″N 5°52′25″E	Weidemolen	Between 1832 and 1850	Demolished before 1874.	
Oentsjerk	Trijnwouden; 53°14′43″N 5°53′11″E	Weidemolen	Before 1850	Demolished before 1874.	
Oentsjerk	Trijnwouden; 53°14′48″N 5°53′12″E	Weidemolen	Before 1832	Demolished before 1850.	
Oentsjerk	Zwarte Broekpolder; 53°14′58″N 5°55′49″E	Grondzeiler	1864	Demolished before 1926.	
Offingawier	Molen van Uiltje de Jong; 53°01′25″N 5°42′31″E	Spinnenkopmolen	Before 1832	Demolished before 1850.	
Offingawier	53°02′47″N 5°43′27″E	Paaltjasker	1975	Dismantled post-1982. Re-erected at De Hoeve 1996.	
Offingawier	Poldere 107; 53°01′30″N 5°41′20″E	Spinnenkopmolen	Before 1832	Demolished before 1928.	
Offingawier	Polder 109; 53°01′48″N 5°41′38″E		Before 1832	Demolished before 1928.	
Offingawier	Poolder 110; 53°02′04″N 5°41′37″E		Before 1832	Demolished before 1929.	
Offingawier	Polder 113; 53°02′08″N 5°42′16″E		Before 1832	Demolished before 1850.	
Offingawier	Polder 113a 53°01′54″N 5°42′21″E		1850	Demolished before 1929.	
Offingawier	Polder 114; 53°02′08″N 5°41′58″E		Between 1832 and 1850	Demolished before 1929.	
Offingawier	Polder 125; 53°02′16″N 5°43′39″E		1850	Demolished before 1929.	
Offingawier	Polder 126; 53°02′10″N 5°42′37″E		Before 1832	Demolished before 1929.	
Offingawier	Polder 127; 53°01′49″N 5°43′12″E		1850	Demolished before 1929.	
Offingawier	Polder 128; 53°01′47″N 5°42′31″E	Spinnenkopmolen	1850	Demolished before 1929.	
Offingawier	53°01′47″N 5°43′20″E		1832	Demolished before 1850.	
Offingawier	Polder Offingawier; 53°01′48″N 5°41′41″E		Before 1832	Demolished before 1928.	
Oldeberkoop	Korenmolen van Oldeberkoop; 52°56′22″N 6°07′26″E	Standerdmolen	Before 1399	Burnt down 1830.	
Oldeberkoop	Molen van Steunebrink; 52°56′01″N 6°06′41″E	Grondzeiler	1851	Demolished 1920, base demolished post-1932.	
Oldeberkoop	Polder 3; 52°55′56″N 6°04′50″E	Weidemolen	Before 1877	Demolished before 1932.	
Oldeberkoop	Polder 4; 52°56′34″N 6°05′46″E	Weidemolen	Before 1877	Demolished before 1922.	
Oldeberkoop	Polder 5; 52°55′27″N 6°08′10″E		1832	Demolished before 1877.	
Oldeholtpade	Korenmolen van Oldeholtpade; 52°53′12″N 6°02′53″E	Standerdmolen	Before 1664	Demolished 1770.	
Oldeholtpade	Molen van Van der Meer; 52°53′12″N 6°02′53″E	Standerdmolen	1770	Demolished 1874.	
Oldeholtpade	Molen van Van der Meer; 52°53′12″N 6°02′53″E	Achtkantmolen	1874	Burnt down 1915, base demolished 2000.	
Oldeholtpade	Polder 124; 52°52′47″N 6°03′16″E		1877	Demolished before 1924.	
Oldeholtpade	Polder 125; 52°52′41″N 6°03′10″E		1877	Demolished before 1929.	
Oldeholtpade	Polder 126; 52°52′27″N 6°03′51″E		Before 1877	Demolished before 1924.	
Oldeholtpade	Polder 127; 52°52′14″N 6°03′10″E		Before 1877	Demolished before 1924.	
Oldeholtwolde	Molen Bezuiden de Tjonger; 52°55′34″N 5°59′07″E	Weidemolen	1877	Demolished before 1922.	
Oldeholtwolde	Molen van Jelle Gourma. 52°54′36″N 5°59′57″E		Before 1832	Demolished before 1850.	
Oldeholtwolde	Polder 98; 52°55′02″N 5°58′36″E		Before 1877	Demolished before 1929.	
Oldeholtwolde	Polder 99; 52°55′12″N 5°58′58″E				
Oldeholtwolde	Polder 100; 52°55′53″N 5°59′48″E		Before 1877	Demolished before 1922.	
Oldeholtwolde	Polder 101; 52°55′42″N 6°00′02″E		Before 1877	Demolished before 1877.	
Oldeholtwolde	Polder 101a 52°54′40″N 6°00′25″E	Weidemolen	1877	Demolished before 1922.	
Oldeholtwolde	Polder 101b 52°54′26″N 6°00′31″E	Weidemolen	1877	Demolished before 1922.	
Oldeholtwolde	Polder 102; 52°54′45″N 6°00′27″E		Before 1877	Demolished before 1922.	
Oldeholtwolde	Polder 102a 52°54′51″N 6°00′23″E	Weidemolen	1877	Demolished before 1922.	
Oldeholtwolde	Polder 102b 52°54′48″N 6°00′29″E	Weidemolen	1877	Demolished before 1922.	
Oldeholtwolde	Polder 102c 52°54′26″N 6°00′36″E	Weidemolen	1877	Demolished before 1922.	
Oldeholtwolde	Polder 102d 52°54′24″N 6°00′40″E	Spinnenkopmolen	Before 1832	Demolished between 1850 and 1922.	
Oldeholtwolde	Polder 103; 52°54′40″N 6°00′39″E		Before 1877	Demolished before 1922.	
Oldeholtwolde	Polder 104; 52°54′48″N 6°00′44″E		Before 1877	Demolished before 1922.	
Oldeholtwolde	Polder 105; 52°54′49″N 6°00′57″E		Before 1877	Demolished before 1922.	
Oldeholtwolde	Polder 105a 52°54′51″N 6°01′05″E	Weidemolen	1877	Demolished before 1922.	
Oldeholtwolde	Polder 106; 52°54′45″N 6°01′06″E		Before 1877	Demolished before 1922.	
Oldeholtwolde	Polder 106a 52°54′53″N 6°01′18″E	Weidemolen	1877	Demolished before 1922.	
Oldeholtwolde	Polder 106b 52°54′54″N 6°01′28″E	Weidemolen	1877	Demolished before 1922.	
Oldeholtwolde	Polder 107; 52°54′55″N 6°01′43″E	Weidemolen	1877	Demolished before 1922.	
Oldeholtwolde	Polder 154; 52°55′58″N 6°00′17″E		1877	Demolished before 1922.	
Oldeholtwolde	Veenpolder van Idzard en Oldenholtwoude; Molen I 52°55′11″N 5°59′01″E	Grondzeiler	Before 1877	Demolished before 1922.	
Oldeholtwolde	Veenpolder van Idzard en Oldenholtwoude; Molen II; 52°55′35″N 6°00′55″E	Grondzeiler	Before 1877	Demolished before 1922.	
Oldeholtwolde	Veenpolder van Idzard en Oldenholtwoude; Molen III; 52°54′59″N 6°01′56″E	Grondzeiler	Before 1877	Demolished before 1922.	
Oldeholtwolde	Veenpolder van Idzard en Oldenholtwoude; Molen IV; 52°54′52″N 6°00′04″E	Grondzeiler	1877	Demolished before 1922.	
Oldelamer	Molen van Gerrit Bos; 52°52′06″N 5°55′35″E	Spinnenkopmolen	Before 1832	Demolished before 1850.	
Oldelamer	Moolen van Johannes Voetberg; 52°52′30″N 5°55′54″E	Spinnenkopmolen	Before 1832	Demolished post-1850.	
Oldelamer	Molen van Nicolaas van Heloma; 52°51′59″N 5°55′11″E	Spinnenkopmolen	Before 1832	Demolished before 1850.	
Oldelamer	Polder Q Nijelaamster Polder; 52°53′07″N 5°55′41″E	Grondzeiler	Before 1832	Demolished post-1930.	
Oldelamer	Polder Q 52°51′48″N 5°53′53″E	Weidemolen	1877	Demolished before 1929.	
Oldelamer	Polder Q 52°52′44″N 5°55′48″E	Grondzeiler	1877	Demolished before 1930.	
Oldelamer	Polder Q 52°51′46″N 5°54′15″E	Grondzeiler	Before 1909	Demolished before 1929, base remains.	
Oldelamer	Polder Q 52°51′32″N 5°54′01″E	Grondzeiler	1877	Demolished before 1929.	
Oldelamer	Polder Q 52°51′38″N 5°53′58″E	Weidemolen	1877	Demolished before 1929.	
Oldelamer	Polder Q 52°51′53″N 5°53′15″E	Weidemolen	1877	Demolished before 1929.	
Oldelamer	Polder 76; Oordpolder; 52°52′15″N 5°51′35″E	Spinnenkopmolen	Before 1832	Demolished c.1954.	
Oldelamer	Polder 77; 52°51′22″N 5°54′25″E		Before 1877	Demolished before 1929.	
Oldelamer	Polder 78; 52°51′37″N 5°54′40″E	Spinnenkopmolen	Before 1832	Demolished post-1929.	
Oldelamer	Polder 79; 52°51′56″N 5°54′32″E		Before 1832	Demolished before 1929.	
Oldelamer	Polder 80; 52°52′04″N 5°56′13″E	Spinnenkopmolen	Before 1877	Demolished post-1929.	
Oldelamer	Polder 80a 52°52′29″N 5°55′25″E	Spinnenkopmolen	Before 1877	Demolished before 1926.	
Oldelamer	Polder 81; 52°52′38″N 5°55′40″E	Spinnenkopmolen	Before 1877	Demolished post-1929.	
Oldelamer	Polder 83; 52°52′54″N 5°56′04″E	Spinnenkopmolen	Before 1877	Demolished post-1929.	
Oldelamer	52°53′05″N 5°55′53″E	Tjasker			
Oldelamer	Molen van Ede Sickinga; 52°52′25″N 5°55′57″E	Spinnenkopmolen	Before 1832	Demolished post-1850.	
Oldelamer	Molen van Jan Jetten; 52°51′35″N 5°54′00″E		Before 1832	Demolished before 1850.	
Oldelamer	Molen van Roelof Timmerman; 52°52′42″N 5°56′30″E	Spinnenkopmolen	Before 1832	Demolished post-1850.	
Oldelamer	52°52′41″N 5°55′43″E			Demolished before 1926.	
Oldelamer	Sickingapodermolen; Molensickenga; 52°52′43″N 5°52′11″E	Spinnenkopmolen	1886	Demolished 1950.	
Oldelamer	52°52′45″N 5°56′08″E	Tjasker		Demolished before 1929.	
Oldelamer	52°52′31″N 5°55′34″E	Tjasker		Demolished before 1929.	
Oldeouwer	Lytse Poldermole; Molen van Assema; 52°54′42″N 5°48′11″E	Spinnenkopmolen	1750	Demolished 1930.	
Oldeouwer	Molen van Gerhardus Simmerman; 52°54′52″N 5°47′09″E		Before 1832	Blown down 1834.	
Oldeouwer	trijegaster Veenpolder; 52°55′00″N 5°47′55″E	Grondzeiler	1741	Demolished 1962.	
Oldetrijne	Polder 112; 52°52′07″N 5°56′24″E	Spinnenkopmolen	Before 1877	Demolished post-1929.	
Oldetrijne	{Polder 112a 52°52′02″N 5°57′07″E	Spinnenkopmolen	Before 1832	Demolished before 1929.	
Oldetrijne	Polder 112b 52°51′54″N 5°56′49″E	Spinnenkopmolen	Before 1832	Demolished before 1929.	
Oldetrijne	Oud Polder 113; 52°51′47″N 5°56′38″E		Before 1877	Demolished post-1877.	
Oldetrijne	Nieuw Polder 113; 52°52′04″N 5°56′16″E	Spinnenkopmolen	1877	Demolished between 1926 and 1934.	
Oldetrijne	Polder 114; 52°51′42″N 5°56′00″E	Spinnenkop stellingmolen	Before 1832	Demolished before 1929.	
Oldetrijne	Polder 115; 52°51′30″N 5°55′35″E	Spinnenkopmolen	Before 1832	Demolished between 1850 and 1929.	
Oldetrijne	Polder 116; 52°51′17″N 5°55′58″E		Before 1877	Demolished before 1924.	
Oldetrijne	Polder 117; 52°51′09″N 5°55′38″E	Spinnenkopmolen	Before 1832	Demolished between 1850 and 1924.	
Oldetrijne	Polder 118; 52°51′19″N 5°55′33″E	Spinnenkopmolen	Before 1832	Demolished between 1850 and 1924.	
Oldetrijne	Polder 119; 52°51′12″N 5°55′22″E	Spinnenkopmolen	Before 1832	Demolished before 1929.	
Oldetrijne	Polder 119a 52°50′52″N 5°02′03″E		Before 1877	Demolished post-1929.	
Oldetrijne	Polder 123; 52°50′45″N 5°58′02″E		Before 1877	Demolished before 1929.	
Oldetrijne	52°50′27″N 5°55′55″E		Before 1799	Burnt down post-1822.	
Oldetrijne	Molen van Rietze Bos; 52°51′40″N 5°56′18″E	Spinnenkopmolen	Before 1832		
Oldetrijne	Oude Trijnster Molen; 52°51′35″N 5°57′37″E	Standerdmolen	Before 1664	Demolished post-1732.	
Oosterbierum	Dingjumerpoldermolen; Molen 1; 53°13′09″N 5°32′00″E	Grondzeiler	1880	Demolished between 1943 and 1950.	
Oosterbierum	Kolthofpoldermolen; De Bjusse; 53°13′25″N 5°32′17″E	Grondzeiler	1870	Blown down 1972.	
Oosterbierum	Molen van Abe Anema; 53°13′41″N 5°31′34″E		Before 1832	Demolished before 1850.	
Oosterbierum	Molen van Jan Koopmans; 53°13′09″N 5°32′00″E	Paaltjasker	Before 1832	Demolished post-1850.	
Oosterbierum	Polder Oosterbierum; 53°13′25″N 5°31′07″E	Grondzeiler	Before 1832	Demolished 1928.	
Oosterwolde	Molen van Van der Meulen; 52°59′09″N 6°18′20″E	Stellingmolen	1850	Burnt down 1862.	
Oosterwolde	Molen van Vondeling; 52°59′09″N 6°18′20″E	Stellingmolen	1862	Demolished 1930.	
Oosterwolde	Oostermolen; 52°00′01″N 6°18′13″E	Standerdmolen	Before 1634	Demolished c.1725.	
Oosterwolde	Veenemolen; 52°59′13″N 6°17′33″E	Standerdmolen	Before 1693	Moved to Appelscha 1852.	
Oosterzee	De Veteraan; Molen van Groeneboom; 52°52′11″N 5°44′49″E	Stellingmolen	1819	Demolished 1937.	
Oosterzee	De Zwarte Gans; 52.°N 5.°E	Spinnenkopmolen			
Oosterzee	Korenmolen van Oosterzee	Standerdmolen	Before 1548	Demolished post 1664.	
Oosterzee	Molen van Dirk de Haan; 52°52′04″N 5°47′16″E	Spinnenkopmolen	Before 1832	Demolished before 1850.	
Oosterzee	Oliemolen van Kerst Klazes; 52°52′19″N 5°44′42″E	Stellingmolen	1799	Demolished 1914.	
Oosterzee	Oosterzeesche Polder; De Bantakkers; 52°51′33″N 5°43′42″E	Spinnenkopmolen	Before 1832	Demolished between 1907 and 1915.	
Oosterzee	Oosterzeesche polder Kleine Buren Polder; 52°52′12″N 5°44′34″E	Grondzeiler	Before 1832	Demolished between 907 and 1915.	
Oosterzee	Oosterzeesche Polder; Oosteinde van Oostersee; 52°52′24″N 5°45′27″E	Grondzeiler	Before 1832	Demolished 1937/38.	
Oosterzee	Oosterzeesche Polder; Westeinde van Ooosterzee; 52°51′52″N 5°44′09″E	Grondzeiler	Before 1832	Demolished between 1907 and 1915.	
Oosterzee	Polder 31; 52°52′15″N 5°46′37″E		Before 1877	Demolished before 1929.	
Oosterzee	Polder 32; 52°52′10″N 5°46′31″E		Before 1832	Demolished before 1929.	
Oosterzee	Polder 33; 52°52′00″N 5°46′45″E		Before 1877	Demolished before 1929.	
Oosterzee	Polder 33; 52°51′59″N 5°47′25″E		Before 1877	Demolished post-1932.	
Oosterzee	Polder 43; 52°52′14″N 5°46′03″E		Before 1873	Demolished before 1930.	
Oosterzee	Polder 44; 52°52′14″N 5°46′30″E	Spinnenkopmolen	Before 1832	Demolished post-1850.	
Oosterzee	Polder 44a 52°51′59″N 5°46′23″E	Spinnenkopmolen	Before 1832	Demolished before 1929.	
Oosterzee	Polder 45; 52°51′37″N 5°46′08″E		Before 1873	Demolished before 1929.	
Oosterzee	Polder 46; 52°51′19″N 5°46′27″E		Before 1873	Demolished before 1929.	
Oosterzee	Polder de Bantakkers; 52°51′12″N 5°43′21″E	Spinnenkopmolen	Before 1832	Demolished before 1905.	
Oosterzee	Veenpolder van Echten; 52°52′35″N 5°46′35″E	Grondzeiler	1863	Demolished between 1911 and 1915.	
Oosterzee	Veenpolder van Echten; 52°52′35″N 5°46′21″E	Grondzeiler	1871	Demolished between 1911 and 1915.	
Oosterzee	Veenpolder van Echten; 52°51′28″N 5°46′28″E		1879	Demolished between 1911 and 1915.	
Oosthem	Kleine Oosthemmerpoldermolen; 53°00′47″N 5°36′14″E	Spinnenkopmolen	Before 1832	Demolished post-1930.	
Oosthem	Molen van Baron Rengers; 53°01′27″N 5°34′07″E	Spinnenkopmolen	Before 1832	Demolished post-1850.	
Oosthem	Molen van Jan Vierstra; 53°01′16″N 5°35′38″E		Before 1832	Demolished post-1850.	
Oosthem	Molen van Uiltje Palsma; 53°01′27″N 5°35′44″E		Before 1832	Demolished before 1850.	
Oosthem	Polder 50; 53°01′09″N 5°36′33″E	Spinnenkopmolen	Before 1832	Demolished post-1930.	
Oosthem	Polder 51; 53°01′29″N 5°36′03″E		Before 1832	Demolished post-1850.	
Oosthem	Polder 51a 53°01′23″N 5°35′49″E		Before 1832	Demolished before 1929.	
Oosthem	Polder 52; 53°01′15″N 5°36′11″E	Spinnenkopmolen	Before 1864	Demolished between 1932 and 1950.	
Oosthem	Polder 53; 53°01′36″N 5°35′28″E	Spinnenkopmolen	Before 1832	Demolished npost-1930.	
Oosthem	Polder 53a 53°01′37″N 5°35′01″E	Spinnenkopmolen	Before 1832	Demolished before 1929.	
Oosthem	Polder 54; 53°01′15″N 5°35′07″E	Grondzeiler	Before 1832	Demolished post-1930.	
Oosthem	Polder 55; 53°01′30″N 5°34′48″E		Before 1832	Demolished before 1929.	
Oosthem	Polder 56; 53°01′46″N 5°34′55″E		Before 1832	Demolished before 1929.	
Oosthem	Polder 57; 53°01′50″N 5°34′29″E	Spinnenkopmolen	Before 1832	Demolished before 1929.	
Oosthem	Polder 74; 53°01′50″N 5°34′25″E	Grondzeiler	Before 1832	Demolished before 1929.	
Oosthem	Polder 87; 53°01′30″N 5°37′08″E	Spinnenkopmolen	Before 1832	Demolished post-1940.	
Oost-Vlieland	53°17′50″N 5°04′01″E	Grondzeiler	Before 1719	Blown down 1861.	
Oost-Vlieland	53°17′50″N 5°04′01″E	Standerdmolen	1563	Demolished before 1719.	
Opeinde	Molen van Eijldert Wijnalda; 53°10′54″N 6°08′35″E		Before 1832	Demolished before 1850.	
Opeinde	53°10′36″N 6°07′26″E	Spinnenkopmolen	Before 1887	Demolished post-1919.	
Opeinde	Water-Molen; 53°12′05″N 6°08′43″E	Spinnenkopmolen	Before 1718		
Opeinde	name 53°12′03″N 6°08′43″E	Spinnenkopmolen	Before 1718		
Opeinde	Kletster Rogmolen; 53°07′22″N 6°04′17″E	Standerdmolen	Before 1664	Demolished 1735.	
Opeinde	53°07′27″N 6°02′10″E	Boktjasker	1885	Demolished 1912.	
Oppenhuizen	De Geeuwpoldermolen; Geaupoldermole; Geau's Mole	Spinnenkop; 53°00′46″N 5°43′26″E	1832		
Oppenhuizen	Polder 132; 53°00′40″N 5°42′00″E	Spinnenkopmolen	Before 1832	Demolished before 1928.	
Oppenhuizen	Polder 133; 53°00′47″N 5°42′03″E		Before 1832	Demolished before 1929.	
Oppenhuizen	Polder 134; 53°00′26″N 5°42′28″E		Before 1832	Demolished before 1929.	
Oppenhuizen	Polder 137; 53°00′33″N 5°41′49″E		Before 1832	Demolished before 1929.	
Oppenhuizen	Polder 138; 53°00′41″N 5°41′40″E		Before 1832	Demolished before 1929.	
Oppenhuizen	Polder 139; 53°00′54″N 5°41′22″E		Before 1832	Demolished before 1932.	
Osingahuizen	Molen van Petrus Visser; 52°58′48″N 5°37′10″E		Before 1832	Demolished post-1850.	
Osingahuizen	Polder 46; 52°59′37″N 5°36′56″E	Grondzeiler	Between 1850 and 1873	Demolished post-1932.	
Osingahuizen	Polder 254; 52°58′36″N 5°37′15″E	Grondzeiler	Before 1832	Demolished post-1930.	
Osingahuizen	Polder 255; 52°58′50″N 5°37′14″E	Grondzeiler	Between 1850 and 1873	Demolished c.1930.	
Osingahuizen	52°59′07″N 5°37′11″E	Spinnenkopmolen	1850	Demolished post-1932.	
Oudebildtzijl	De Leeuw; 53°18′05″N 5°43′05″E	Stellingmolen	1857	Burnt down 1927.	
Oudebildtzijl	Polder 9; 53°18′42″N 5°42′17″E	Grondzeiler	Before 1873	Demolished post-1977.	
Oudebildtzijl	Polder 10; 53°18′51″N 5°43′03″E	Grondzeiler	Before 1873	Demolished post-1929.	
Oudebildtzijl	Polder Kapershoek; Nieuw Monnikebildt; 53°18′51″N 5°43′17″E	Grondzeiler	Before 1832	Demolished post-1832.	
Oudebildtzijl	West- en Oost- Bildtpollen; 53°19′08″N 5°42′01″E		1813	Demolished 1912.	
Oudega	Dorismooltje; 52°59′53″N 5°32′12″E	Spinnenkop	1790	Demolished c. 1935, base left standing. De Hollandsche Molen (in Dutch)	
Oudega	Doris Mooltje, Oudega; 52°59′53″N 5°32′12″E	Spinnenkop	1997		
Oudega	Windmotor Barfjild	Iron windpump		Molendatabase (in Dutch)	
Oudwoude		Achtkantmolen	1858	Demolished 1941, base remains standing.	
Oudega	De Hoop; 53°07′50″N 6°00′21″E	Stellingmolen	1908	Demolished 1922, base remains.	
Oudega	Grote Noordwolderpoldermolen; De Hersteller; 52°54′03″N 5°31′57″E	Grondzeiler	1818	Burnt down 1918.	
Oudega	Korenmolen van Oudega; 53°07′50″N 6°00′21″E	Standerdmolen	1639	Demolished 1908.	
Oudega	Korenmolen van Oudega; 52°54′07″N 5°31′10″E	Standerdmolen	Before 1639	Demolished before 1800.	
Oudega	Molen van de Kerkvoogdij; 53°08′23″N 5°58′19″E		Before 1832	Demolished before 1850.	
Oudega	Molen van de Kerkvoogdij; 53°07′52″N 6°00′41″E	Spinnenkopmolen	Before 1832	Demolished before 1850.	
Oudega	Molen van Douwe Boschma; 52°59′39″N 5°33′26″E		Before 1832	Demolished before 1850.	
Oudega	Molen van E. T. van Sminia; 53°08′28″N 5°58′21″E		Before 1832	Demolished before 1850.	
Oudega	Molen van Harmen Veenstra; 53°06′27″N 5°57′02″E	Spinnenkopmolen	Before 1832	Demolished before 1850.	
Oudega	Molen van Harmen Veenstra; 53°08′18″N 5°57′26″E	Spinnenkopmolen	Before 1832	Demolished before 1850.	
Oudega	Molen van Harmen Vorst; 52°55′08″N 5°30′32″E		Before 1832	Demolished before 1850.	
Oudega	Molen van Hector van Vierssen; 53°07′15″N 5°59′55″E		Before 1832	Demolished before 1850.	
Oudega	Molen van Jan Klijnstra; 52°54′58″N 5°35′33″E	Spinnenkopmolen	Before 1832	Demolished before 1850.	
Oudega	Molen van Jan van Keimpma; 53°07′34″N 5°57′02″E	Spinnenkopmolen	Before 1832	Demolished before 1850.	
Oudega	Molen van Jelle Meinisz; 52°54′51″N 5°32′17″E	Spinnenkopmolen	Before 1832	Demolished before 1850.	
Oudega	Molen van Kerst Hogeboom; 52°55′00″N 5°32′27″E	Spinnenkopmolen	Before 1832	Demolished before 1850.	
Oudega	Molen van Sijbren van der Meulen; 52°59′23″N 5°33′58″E	Spinnenkopmolen	Before 1832	Demolished before 1850.	
Oudega	Molen van Sipke Buma; 52°59′28″N 5°33′42″E	Spinnenkopmolen	Before 1832	Demolished post-1850.	
Oudega	Molen van Willem van Hateren; 52°59′29″N 5°33′14″E		Before 1832	Demolished before 1850.	
Oudega	Oosterpoldermolen; 52°59′35″N 5°34′34″E		Before 1832	Demolished post-1930.	
Oudega	Polder 20; 53°00′20″N 5°31′25″E	Grondzeiler	Before 1832	Demolished post-1920.	
Oudega	Polder 31; 52°59′57″N 5°30′26″E	Spinnenkopmolen	Before 1832	Demolished post-1930.	
Oudega	Polder 32; 52°59′55″N 5°30′52″E	Spinnenkopmolen	Before 1832	Demolished post-1930.	
Oudega	Polder 33; 52°59′47″N 5°31′15″E	Spinnenkopmolen	Before 1832	Demolished post-1930.	
Oudega	Polder 33a 53°00′13″N 5°31′01″E		Before 1850	Demolished before 1930.	
Oudega	Polder 33b 53°00′10″N 5°31′51″E	Grondzeiler	Before 1873	Demolished between 1928 and 1930.	
Oudega	Polder 38; 52°59′42″N 5°33′27″E		1850	Demolished before 1932.	
Oudega	Polder 39; 52°59′35″N 5°33′44″E		Before 1832	Demolished post-1930.	
Oudega	Oud Polder 41; 52°59′29″N 5°33′47″E		Before 1832	Demolished post-1922.	
Oudega	Nieuw Polder 41; 52°59′27″N 5°33′56″E	Grondzeiler	1850	Demolished post-1930.	
Oudega	Polder 42; 52°59′34″N 5°34′10″E	Spinnenkopmolen	Before 1832	Demolished post-1930.	
Oudega	Polder 43; 52°59′32″N 5°34′17″E	Spinnenkopmolen	Before 1832	Demolished post-1930.	
Oudega	Polder 92; 53°06′17″N 5°53′12″E		Before 1832	Demolished post-1930.	
Oudega	Polder 93; 53°06′02″N 5°53′16″E		Before 1832	Demolished post-1930.	
Oudega	Polder 204a 53°07′04″N 5°56′34″E	Spinnenkopmolen	Before 1832	Demolished between 1850 and 1876.	
Oudega	Polder 205; 53°06′52″N 5°56′50″E		Before 1876	Demolished before 1924.	
Oudega	Polder 206; 53°06′41″N 5°57′16″E		Before 1876	Demolished before 1924.	
Oudega	Polder 207; 53°06′41″N 5°57′35″E		Before 1876	Demolished before 1924.	
Oudega	Polder 263; 52°59′21″N 5°34′20″E	Spinnenkopmolen	Before 1832	Demolished post-1930.	
Oudega	Polder 264; 52°59′28″N 5°33′45″E		1850	Demolished between 1922 and 1928.	
Oudega	Polder 266; 52°59′25″N 5°32′54″E	Grondzeiler	Before 1832	Demolished before 1928.	
Oudega	Polder De Geeuw; 52°59′00″N 5°33′37″E	Grondzeiler	1850	Demolished post-1930.	
Oudega	Polder Goudjepoel; 53°06′56″N 6°00′45″E			Demolished post-1928.	
Oudega	Polder Het Joo; 52°59′13″N 5°33′08″E		1850	Demolished before 1928.	
Oudega	Polder op de Wal; 53°07′17″N 6°00′00″E	Tjasker		Demolished 1907.	
Oudega	Woudpoldermolen; 52°54′03″N 5°31′57″E	Spinnenkopmolen		Demolished post-1832.	
Oudega	Woudpoldermolen; 52°54′32″N 5°31′49″E	Spinnenkopmolen	Before 1832	Demolished post-1850.	
Oudehaske	Molen van Eise Slof; 52°57′53″N 5°52′00″E	Spinnenkopmolen	Before 1832	Demolished before 1850.	
Oudehaske	Molen van IJds Klompmaker; 52°57′30″N 5°51′30″E	Spinnenkopmolen	Before 1832	Demolished before 1850.	
Oudehaske	Molen van Jan de Vries; 52°57′41″N 5°52′27″E	Spinnenkopmolen	Before 1832	Demolishe post-1850.	
Oudehaske	Molen van Petrus Metz; 52°57′22″N 5°52′38″E	Spinnenkopmolen	Before 1832	Demolished before 1850.	
Oudehaske	Molen van Pieter Klijnstra; 52°57′16″N 5°51′33″E	Spinnenkopmolen	Before 1832	Demolished before 1850.	
Oudehaske	Molen van Tijmen Kloo; 52°57′23″N 5°53′12″E	Spinnenkopmolen	Before 1832	Demolished before 1850.	
Oudehaske	Polder 35; 52°57′02″N 5°52′25″E		Before 1877	Demolished post-1929.	
Oudehaske	Polder 36; 52°57′18″N 5°52′09″E		Before 1832	Demolished between 1850 and 1929.	
Oudehaske	Polder 36a 52°57′13″N 5°51′15″E		1873	Demolished before 1932.	
Oudehorne	Molen van Arend de Vries; De Oude Klaas; 52°57′56″N 6°05′40″E	Grondzeiler	1882	Demolished 1927.	
Oudehorne	Molen van Sybe Nijenhuis; 52°56′55″N 6°06′22″E		Before 1832	Demolished before 1850.	
Oudehorne	Polder 1; 52°56′38″N 6°04′45″E	Weidemolen	Before 1877	Demolished before 1922.	
Oudehorne	Polder 2; 52°56′40″N 6°05′23″E	Weidemolen	Before 1877	Demolished before 1922.	
Oude Leije	De Balkendsterpoldermolen; 53°17′02″N 5°44′15″E	Grondzeiler	1844		
Oudemirdum	Korenmolen van Oudemirdum; 52°50′55″N 5°32′02″E	Standerdmolen	Before 1639	Demolished 1782.	
Oudemirdum	52°50′54″N 5°30′32″E	Grondzeiler	Before 1850	Demolished post-1864.	
Oudeschoot	Schoter Molen; 52°56′00″N 5°57′16″E	Standerdmolen	Before 1470	Moved to Heerenveen between 1580 and 1595.	
Ouwsterhaule	Polder 1 Haulsterpoel; 52°55′57″N 5°48′23″E		1850	Demolished before 1929.	
Ouwsterhaule	52°56′14″N 5°48′43″E	Spinnenkopmolen			
Ouwsterhaule	Korenmolen van Ouwsterhaule; 52°56′34″N 5°49′07″E		Before 1695	Demolished between 1718 and 1832.	
Ouwsterhaule	Polder M 52°56′36″N 5°48′01″E		Before 1832	Demolished before 1932.	
Ouwsterhaule	Polder P 52°56′35″N 5°54′43″E		Before 1877	Demolished before 1932.	

== P ==
Location	Name of mill	Type	Built	Notes	Photograph
Parrega	Aemingameerpolder; 53°00′47″N 5°28′10″E	Grondzeiler	Before 182	Demolished before 1929.	
Parrega	Angterperpolder; 53°01′40″N 5°27′59″E		Before 1832	Demolished 1923/24.	
Parrega	IJsgumerpolder; 53°01′10″N 5°29′19″E	Spinnenkopmolen	Before 1832	Demolished before 1929.	
Parrega	Molen van Hotze Jorritsma; 53°01′12″N 5°28′14″E	Spinnenkopmolen	Before 1832	Demolished before 1850.	
Parrega	Molen van Sipke Basseleur; 53°00′59″N 5°28′49″E		Before 1832	Demolished before 1850.	
Parrega	Monebuursterpoel; 53°01′24″N 5°28′11″E	Spinnenkopmolen	Between 1850 and 1873	Demolished post-1930.	
Parrega	Polder 11; 53°01′13″N 5°28′31″E	Spinnenkopmolen	Before 1832	Demolished before 1929.	
Parrega	Oud Polder 12; 53°00′48″N 5°28′47″E		Before 1832	Demolished before 1929.	
Parrega	Nieuw Polder 12; 53°00′41″N 5°28′39″E	Spinnenkopmolen	1850	Demolished post-1929.	
Parrega	Polder 13; 53°00′43″N 5°28′02″E	Grondzeiler	Before 1832	Demolished post-1929.	
Parrega	Polder 14; 53°00′28″N 5°27′57″E	Spinnenkopmolen	Before 1832	Demolished before 1929.	
Parrega	Polder 26; 53°01′14″N 5°29′12″E	Spinnenkopmolen	Before 1832	Demolished between 1925 and 1930.	
Parrega	53°01′31″N 5°28′10″E		Before 1718	Demolished before 1832.	
Peazens	De Hond; 53°23′53″N 6°05′14″E	Stellingmolen	1861		
Peins	Grote Feikemanpolder; 53°12′42″N 5°36′27″E		Before 1832	Demolished before 1850.	
Peins	Kleine Feikemanpolder; 53°12′45″N 5°36′11″E		Before 1832	Demolished before 1850.	
Peperga	Polder 135; Catspolder; 52°51′32″N 6°02′15″E		Before 1850	Demolished before 1877.	
Peperga	Polder 135; Catspolder; 52°51′46″N 6°02′04″E		Before 1877	Burnt down 1905.	
Peperga	Polder 135a 52°51′42″N 6°03′22″E		Before 1877	Demolished before 1924.	
Peperga	Polder 136; 52°51′05″N 6°02′59″E		1877	Demolished before 1924.	
Peperga	Korenmolen van De Blesse; 52°50′31″N 6°02′32″E	Standerdmolen	1639	Blown down 1833.	
Peperga	52°51′29″N 6°02′40″E	Spinnenkopmolen	Between 1877 and 1907	Demolished before 1924.	
Peperga	52°51′28″N 6°03′24″E	Spinnenkopmolen	1887	Demolished post-1924.	
Piaam	Molen van Douwe Johannes van der Kooij; 53°01′58″N 5°25′28″E	Spinnenkopmolen	Before 1832	Demolished 1850.	
Piaam	Polder 2; 53°02′07″N 5°24′30″E	Spinnenkopmolen	Before 1832	Demolished before 1850.	
Piaam	Polder 2a 53°02′24″N 5°24′29″E	Spinnenkopmolen	Before 1832	Demolished post-1850.	
Piaam	Polder 2b 53°02′00″N 5°24′43″E		Before 1850	Demolished before 1930.	
Piaam	Oud Polder 5; 53°02′03″N 5°26′03″E	Spinnenkopmolen	Before 1832	Demolished post-1850.	
Piaam	Nieuw Polder 5; 53°02′05″N 5°26′03″E	Grondzeiler	Before 1832	Demolished before 1850.	
Piaam	Polder 6; 53°01′59″N 5°25′14″E	Grondzeiler	1850	Demolished before 1930.	
Piaam	Polder 7; 53°01′58″N 5°24′45″E	Grondzeiler	Before 1832	Demolished post-1850.	
Piaam	Polder 8; 53°01′44″N 5°25′31″E	Grondzeiler	Before 1832	Demolished before 1850.	
Pietersbierum	Polder Pietersbierum; 53°13′07″N 5°27′18″E	Grondzeiler	1849	Demolished before 1928.	
Pingjum	Korenmolen van Pingjum; 53°06′54″N 5°26′14″E	Standerdmolen	Before 1663	Demolished between 1739 and 1832.	
Pingjum	Waterschap Pingjum; 53°06′41″N 5°27′06″E	Grondzeiler	1818	Demolished 1932/33.	
Pingjum	Waterschap Pingjum; 53°06′52″N 5°26′05″E	Grondzeiler	1818	Demolished c.1903.	
Poppenwier	Molen van Tjalling van Eijsinga; 53°05′11″N 5°45′22″E		Before 1832	Demolished before 1850.	
Poppenwier	Molen van Tjalling van Eijsinga; 53°04′48″N 5°45′28″E		Before 1832	Demolished before 1850.	
Poppenwier	Polder 145; 53°05′09″N 5°46′39″E		Before 1832	Demolished before 1929.	
Poppenwier	Polder 147; 53°05′17″N 5°45′49″E		Before 1832	Demolished before 1929.	
Poppenwier	Polder 150; 53°05′18″N 5°44′33″E		Before 1832	Demolished before 1929.	
Poppenwier	Polder 151; 53°05′06″N 5°45′40″E		Between 1850 and 1873	Demolished before 1929.	
Poppenwier	Polder 152; 53°05′04″N 5°46′02″E	Grondzeiler	Before 1832	Demolished before 1929.	
Poppenwier	Polder 153; 53°04′55″N 5°46′12″E		Before 1832	Demolished before 1929.	
Poppenwier	Polder 154; 53°04′48″N 5°46′19″E		Before 1832	Demolished before 1929.	
Poppenwier	Polder 155; 53°04′53″N 5°45′44″E		Before 1832	Demolished before 1929.	
Poppenwier	Polder 156; 53°04′50″N 5°45′13″E		Before 1832	Demolished before 1929.	
Poppenwier	Polder 157; 53°04′49″N 5°45′03″E	Grondzeiler	Before 1832	Demolished c.1929.	
Poppenwier	Polder 158; 53°04′36″N 5°45′07″E		Before 1832	Demolished before 1929.	
Poppenwier	Polder 159; 53°04′48″N 5°44′45″E	Spinnenkopmolen	Before 1832	Demolished before 1929.	
Poppenwier	Polder 160; 53°04′33″N 5°44′51″E		1850	Demolished before 1929.	
Poppenwier	Polder 173; 53°04′21″N 5°45′29″E		Before 1832	Demolished before 1929.	
Poppenwier	Polder 174; 53°04′28″N 5°46′35″E		Before 1832	Demolished before 1929.	

== Notes ==
Mills still standing marked in bold. Known building dates are bold, otherwise the date is the earliest known date the mill was standing.
