= Nijetrijne =

- Village
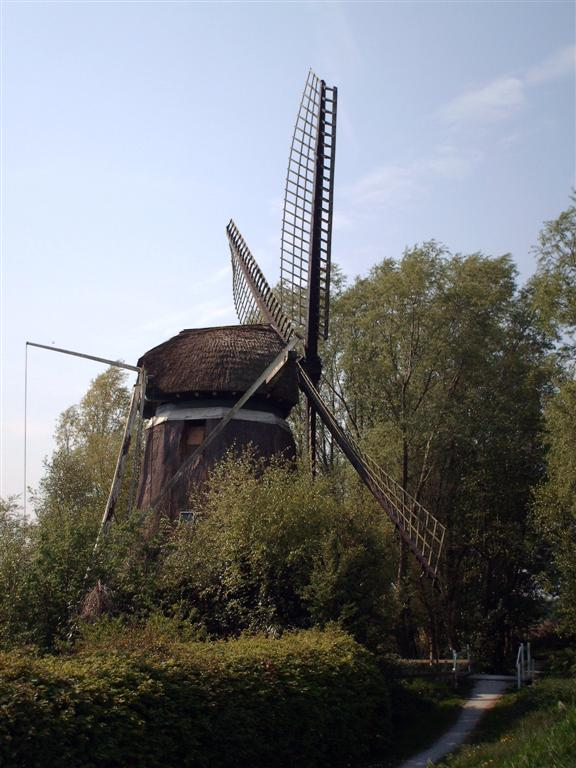
- De Rietvink Mill

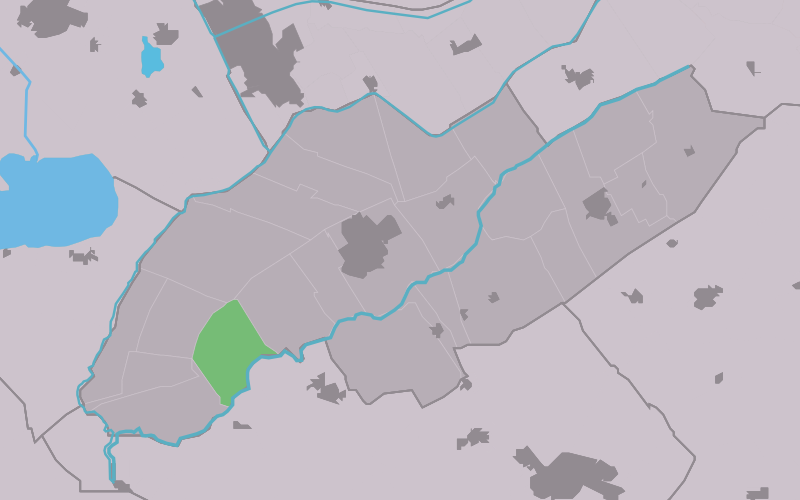
- Location in Weststellingwerf municipality

- Location in the Netherlands Nijetrijne (Netherlands)
- Country: Netherlands
- Province: Friesland
- Municipality: Weststellingwerf

Area
  - Total: 7.94 km^{2} (3.07 sq mi)
- Elevation: −0.3 m (−0.98 ft)

Population (2021)
  - Total: 140
  - Density: 18/km^{2} (46/sq mi)
- Time zone: UTC+1 (CET)
  - Summer (DST): UTC+2 (CEST)
- Postal code: 8481
- Dialing code: 0561

Nijetrijne (West Frisian: Nijetrine) is a small village in Weststellingwerf in the province of Friesland, the Netherlands, with a population of around 113 as of 2017.

There are three windmills in the village; De Reiger, De Rietvink, and a tjasker, the Boktjasker.

== History ==
The village was first mentioned in 1320 as Nienwestrinde, and means "new border line". Nije (new) has been added to distinguish from Oldetrijne. The Dutch Reformed dates from 1919.

Nijetrijne was home to 120 in 1840.

== Gallery ==
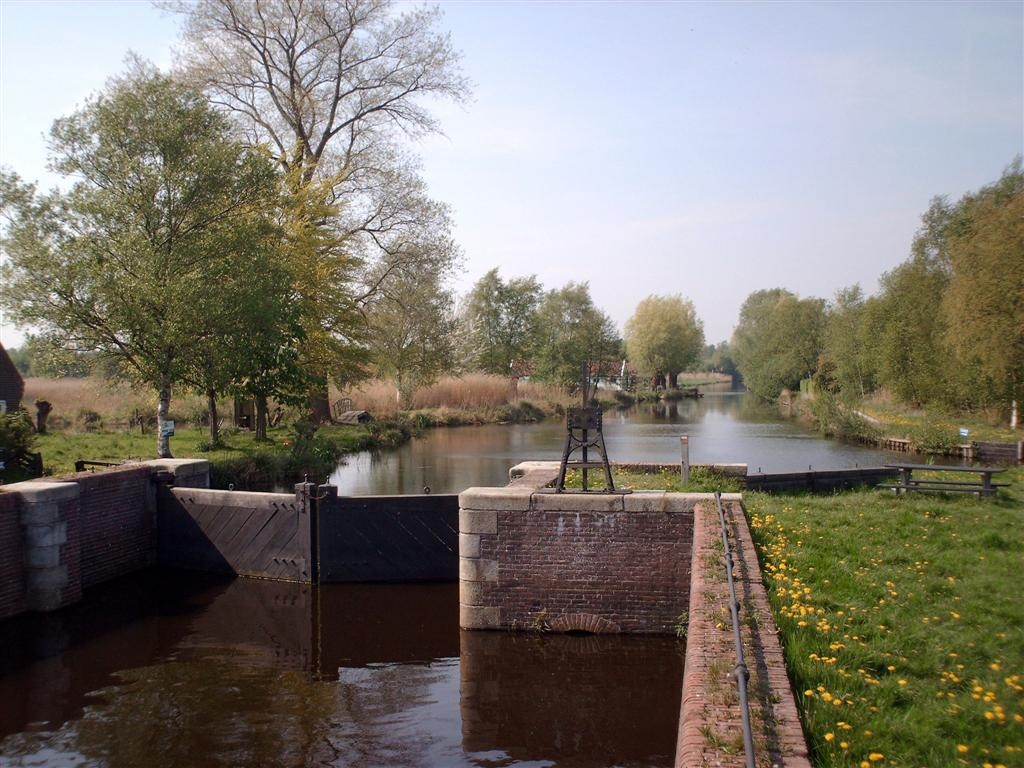
Sluice in Nijetrijne

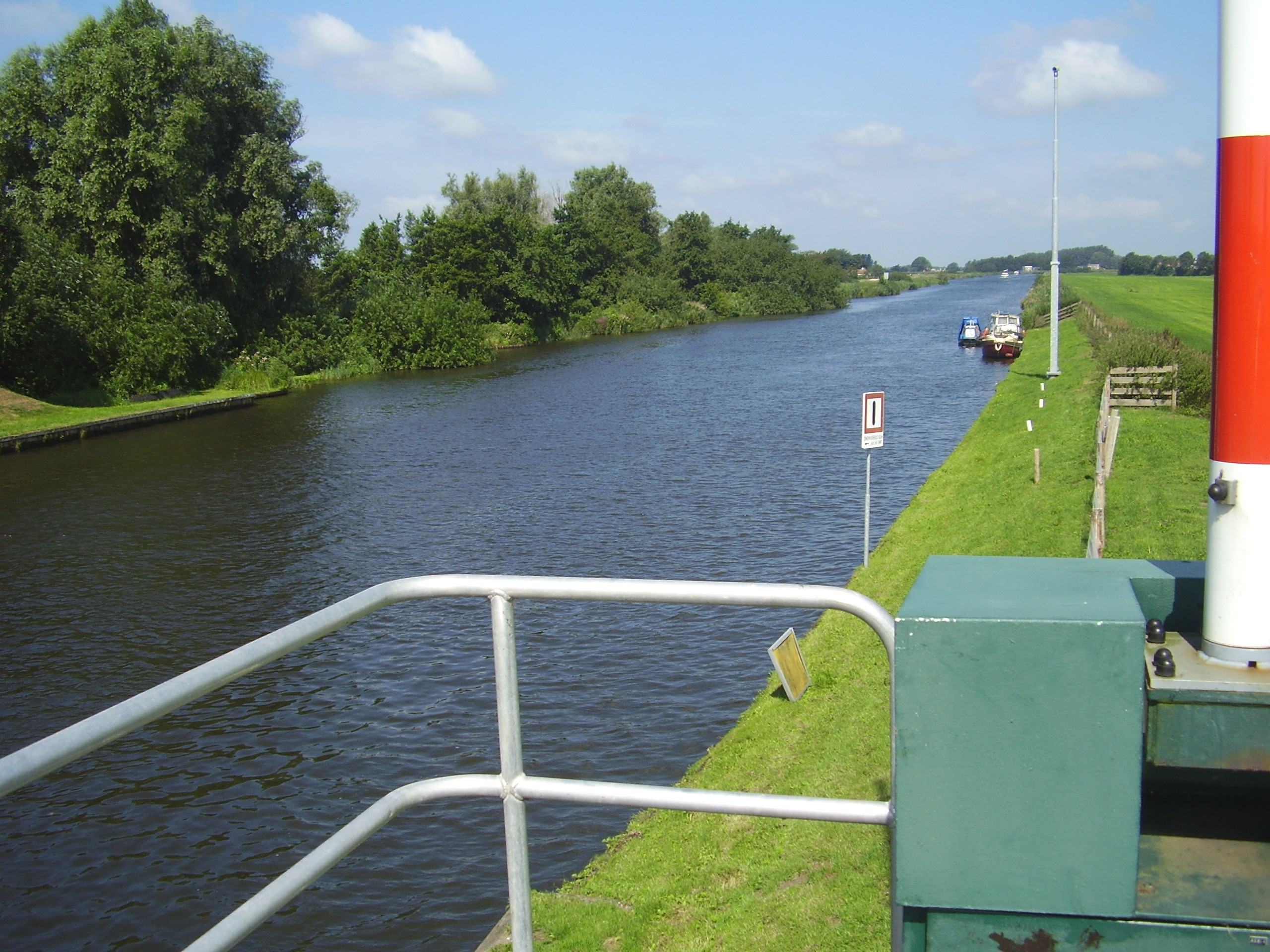
Jonkersvaart

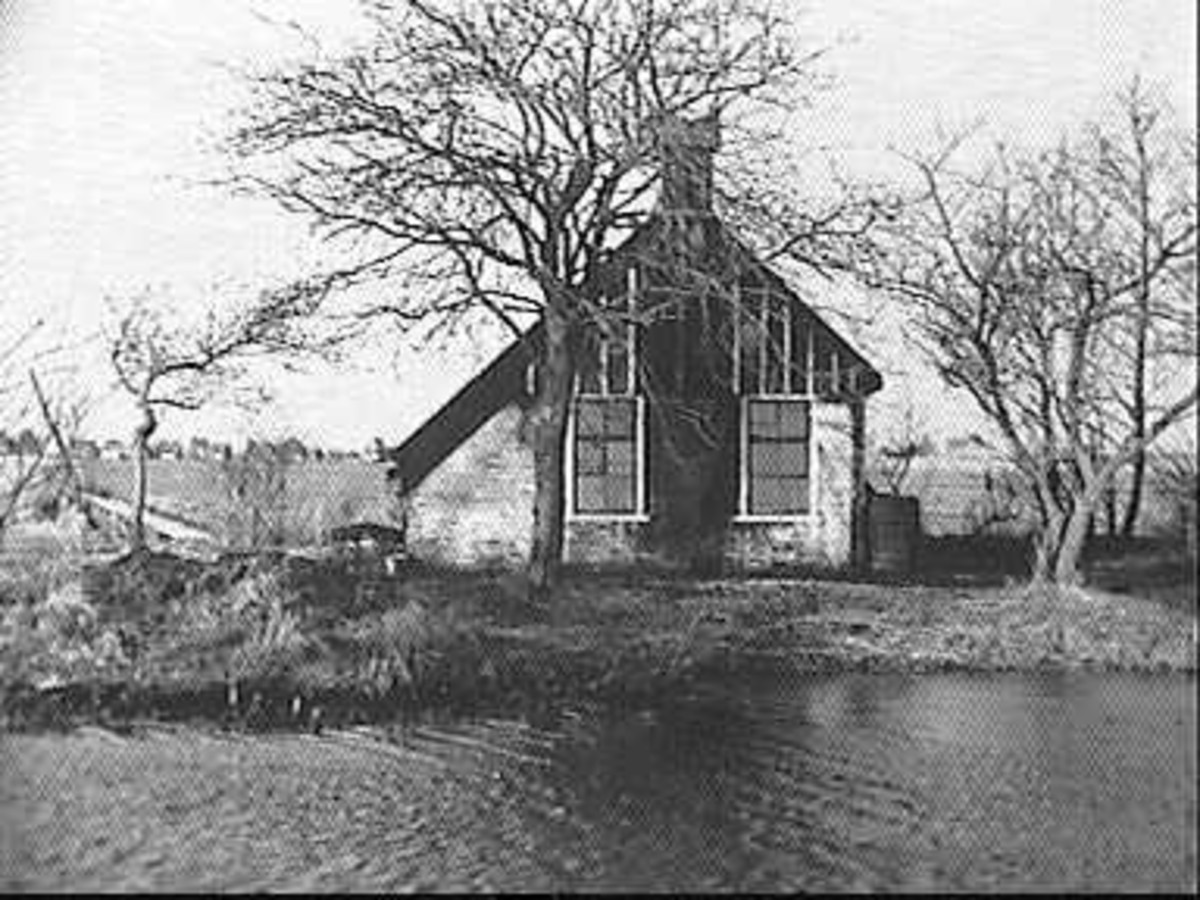
Peat excavator's hut (1946)
