= De Reiger, Nijetrijne =

Windmill in Nijetrijne, Netherlands

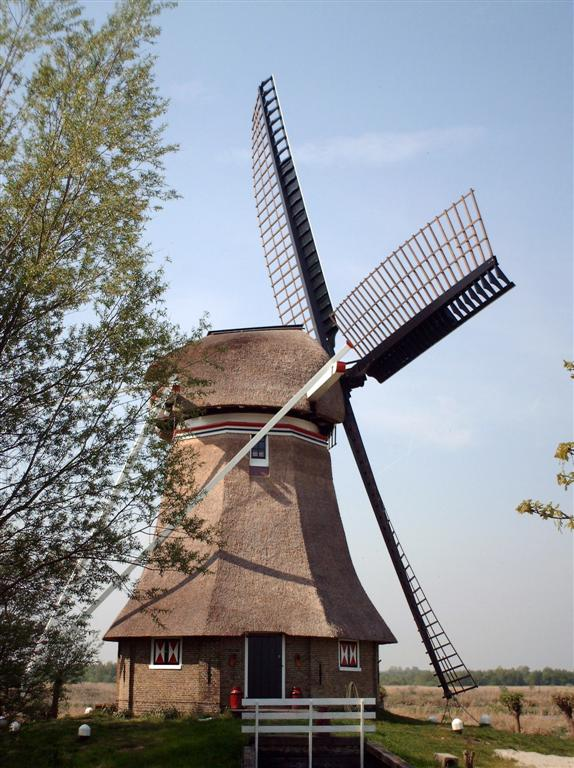
- De Reiger, April 2007.

Origin
- Mill name: De Reiger
- Mill location: Veendijk 1, 8481 JC Nijetrijne
- Coordinates: 52°51′09″N 5°55′07″E
- Operator(s): Private
- Year built: 1871

Information
- Purpose: Drainage mill
- Type: Smock mill
- Storeys: Two storey smock
- Base storeys: Single storey base
- Smock sides: Eight sides
- No. of sails: Four sails
- Type of sails: Common sails
- Windshaft: Cast iron
- Winding: Tailpole and winch
- Type of pump: Archimedes screw

De Reiger (English: The Heron) is a smock mill in Nijetrijne, Friesland, Netherlands which was built in 1871. The mill has been converted into a holiday home. It is listed as a Rijksmonument.

== History ==
The mill was built in 1871 by Jan Hernanus Engelmoer for ƒ9,097, the millers house costing a further ƒ903. It was first set to work on 24 December 1871. The mill was built to drain the Grote Veenpolder. It was stopped working in 1956 due to a defect with its Archimedes' screw. Although repaired, the mill finally ceased working early in 1958. It was then converted to a holiday home. Following refurbishment in 1969, the sails were again capable of turning by wind. A further restoration in 2006 saw the mill fitted with new sails, slightly shorter than the originals. Formerly known as Molen №5, the name De Reiger was only given to the mill after it was converted to a holiday cottage. The mill is listed as a Rijksmonument, №38870.

== Description ==
De Reiger is what the Dutch describe as a Grondzeiler. It is a two storey smock mill on a single storey brick base. There is no stage, the sails reaching almost to ground level. The mill is winded by tailpole and winch. The smock and cap are thatched. The sails are Common sails. They have a span of 20.00 metres (65 ft 7 in). The sails are carried on a cast iron windshaft. It also carries the brake wheel which has 59 cogs. No other machinery survives in the mill, which had an Archimedes' screw.

== Operators ==
- IJsbrand Tijmans de Boer (1871-1905)
- Gerard Blom (1905–11)
- Joh. de Lange (1911–58)

Reference for above:-
