= De Rietvink, Nijetrijne =

Windmill in Nijetrijne, Netherlands

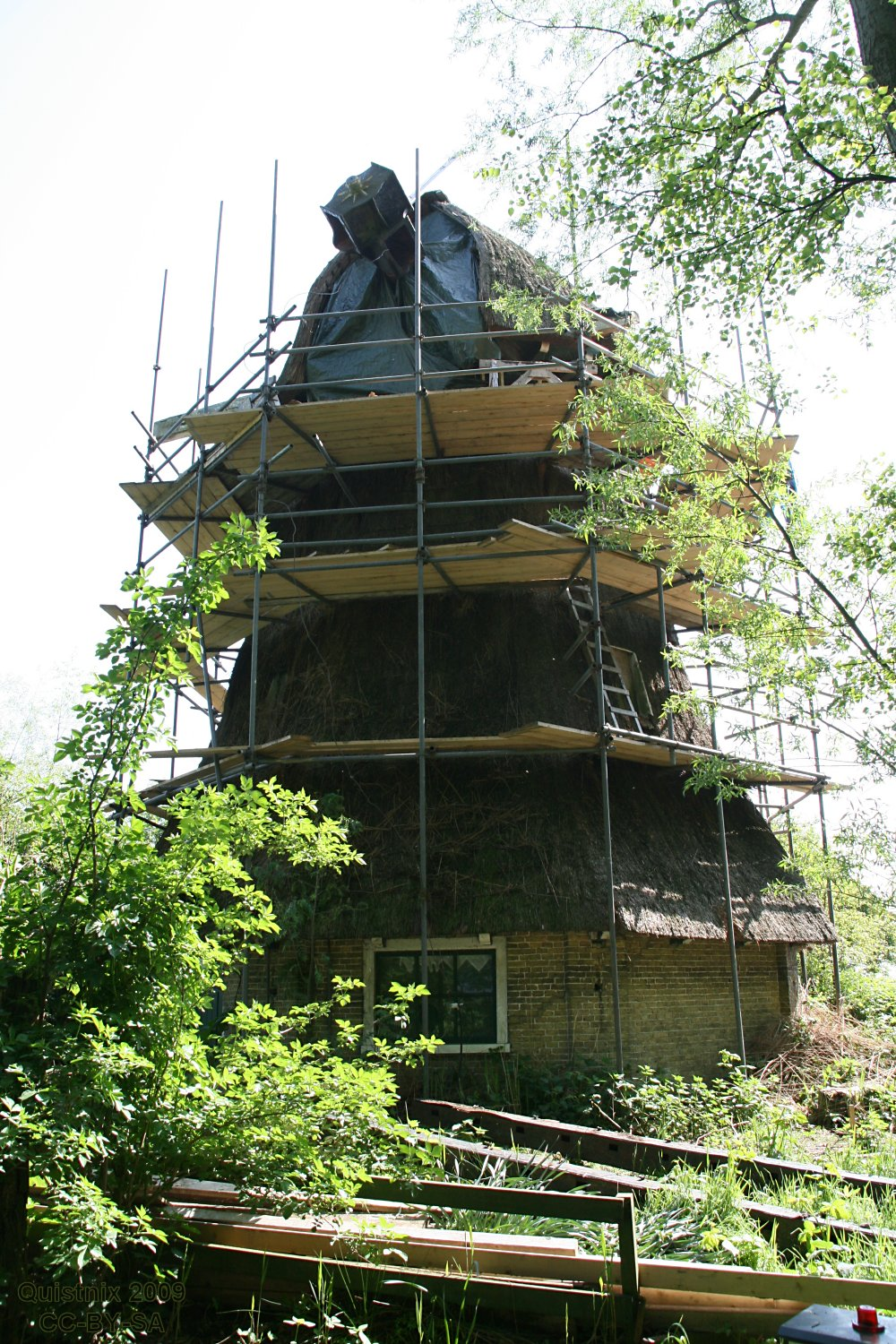
- De Rietvink under repair, May 2009.

Origin
- Mill name: De Rietvink
- Mill location: Veendijk 6, 8481 JC Nijetrijne
- Coordinates: 52°51′16″N 5°54′44″E
- Operator(s): Private
- Year built: 1855

Information
- Purpose: Drainage mill
- Type: Smock mill
- Storeys: Two storey smock
- Base storeys: Single storey base
- Smock sides: Eight sides
- No. of sails: Four sails
- Type of sails: Common sails
- Windshaft: Cast iron
- Winding: Tailpole and winch
- Type of pump: Archimedes screw

De Rietvink (English: The Reed Warbler) is a smock mill in Nijetrijne, Friesland, Netherlands which was built in 1855 and ceased work in 1964. The mill had been converted into a holiday home, but was restored to working order in 2009. It is listed as a Rijksmonument.

== History ==
The mill was built in 1855 to drain the Grote Veenpolder. The first person to work the mill was paid ƒ3 per week, being allowed to live in the mill free of charge. It stopped working in 1964. Subsequently being converted to a holiday home in 1969, but retaining most of its machinery. During its working life, the mill was known as Molen №1, the name De Rietvink was given to it after it had been converted to a holiday home. Work began on the mill's restoration om December 2008. The restored mill working for the first time in June 2010. The work was carried out by Messrs Bouw '75 of Workum. The mill is listed as a Rijksmonument, №38871.

== Description ==
De Rietvink is what the Dutch describe as a Grondzeiler. It is a two storey smock mill on a single storey brick base. There is no stage, the sails reaching almost to ground level. The mill is winded by tailpole and winch. The smock and cap are thatched. The sails are Common sails. They have a span of 20.10 metres (65 ft 11 in). The sails are carried on a cast iron windshaft. It also carries the brake wheel which has 61 cogs. This drives the wallower (31 cogs) at the top of the upright shaft. At the bottom of the upright shaft there are two crown wheels The upper crown wheel, which has 43 cogs drives an Archimedes' screw via a crown wheel. The lower crown wheel, which has 41 cogs is carried on the axle of an Archimedes' screw, which is used to drain the polder. The axle of the screw is 34 centimetres (1 ft 1 in) diameter. The screw is 1.35 metres (4 ft 5 in) diameter.

== Operators ==
- Rommert Koenders Dijkstra (1855)
- Rommert Bouwes Oosted (1855–58)
- Gerben Minnes de Hoop (1858–62)
- Minne Gerbens de Hoop (1862–64)
- Foppe Fritskes Hopkema (1864–96)
- Jacob Konings (1896-1931)
- Albert Konings (1931–64)

References for above:-

== Public access ==
De Rietvink is open to the public by appointment or whenever it is working.
