= Oldetrijne =

- Village
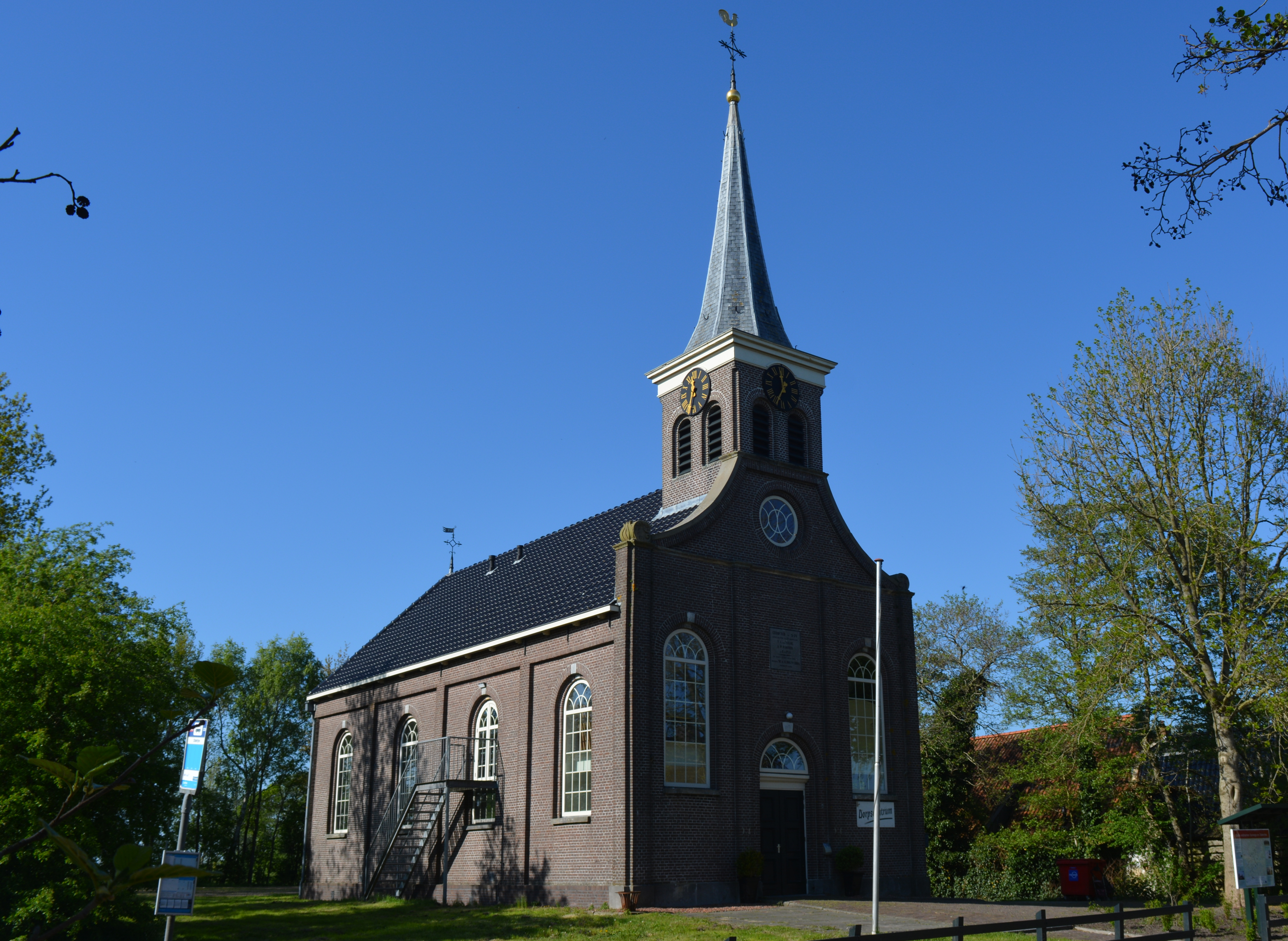
- Church of Oldetrijne

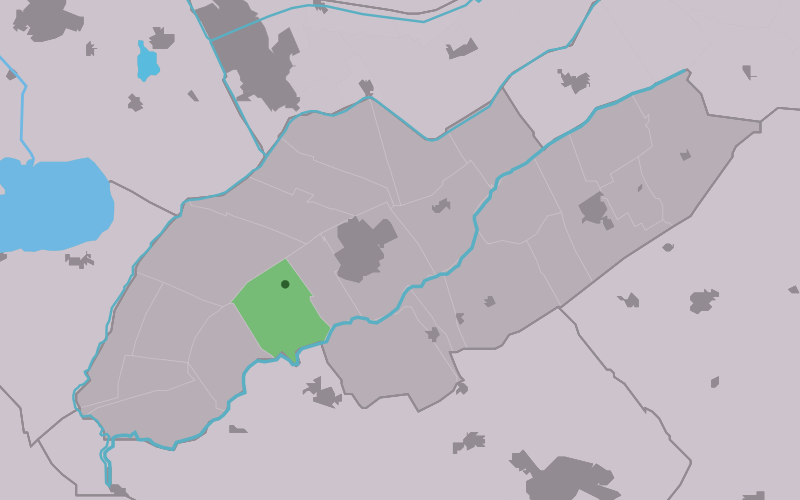
- Location in Weststellingwerf municipality

- Location in the Netherlands Oldetrijne (Netherlands)
- Country: Netherlands
- Province: Friesland
- Municipality: Weststellingwerf

Area
  - Total: 9.89 km^{2} (3.82 sq mi)
- Elevation: 0.2 m (0.66 ft)

Population (2021)
  - Total: 215
  - Density: 21.7/km^{2} (56.3/sq mi)
- Time zone: UTC+1 (CET)
  - Summer (DST): UTC+2 (CEST)
- Postal code: 8479
- Dialing code: 0561

Oldetrijne (West Frisian: Aldetrine) is a village in Weststellingwerf in the province of Friesland, the Netherlands. It had a population of around 210 in 2017.

The village was first mentioned in 1320 as Ostrinde, and means "old border line". Olde (old) has been added to distinguish from Nijetrijne. Oldetrijne is a road village which developed along the Schoterzijl to Wolvega road. The Dutch Reformed church dates from 1870. In 1979, the church is also in use as the village house.

Oldetrijne was home to 265 people in 1840.

== Gallery ==
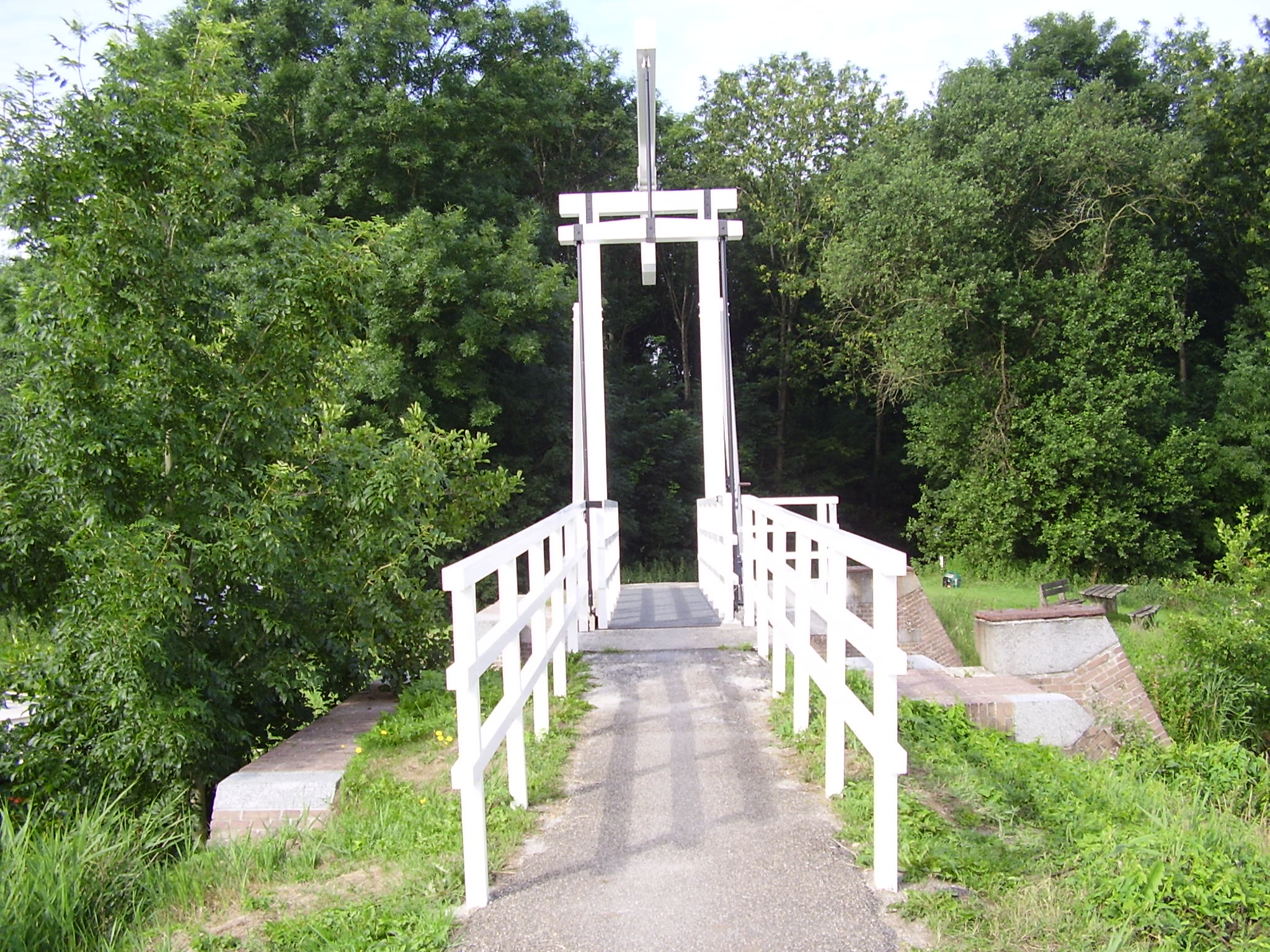
Bicycle bridge

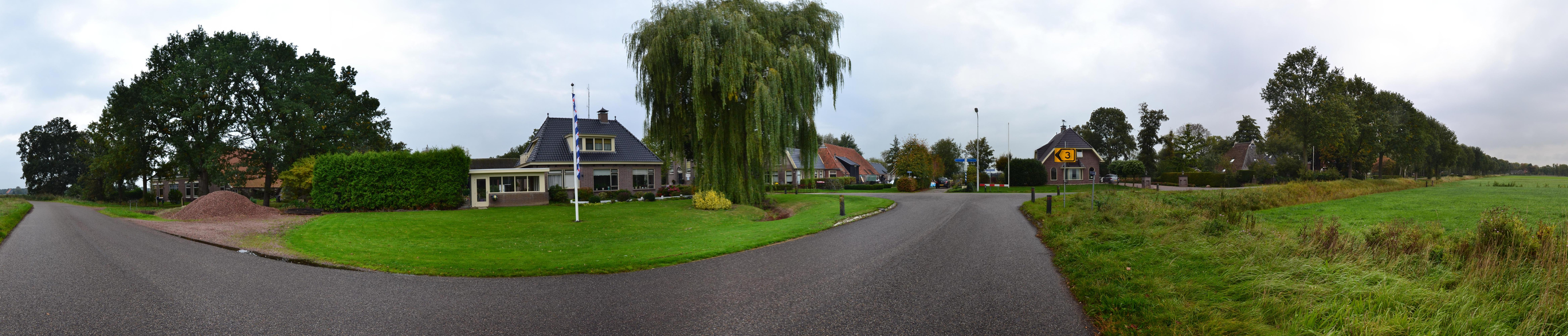
Panorama of Oldetrijne
