= Tjaskers in Friesland =

Windmill used for drainage

A tjasker is a type of small drainage windmill used in the Netherlands. There are thirteen tjaskers remaining in Friesland.

== Locations ==
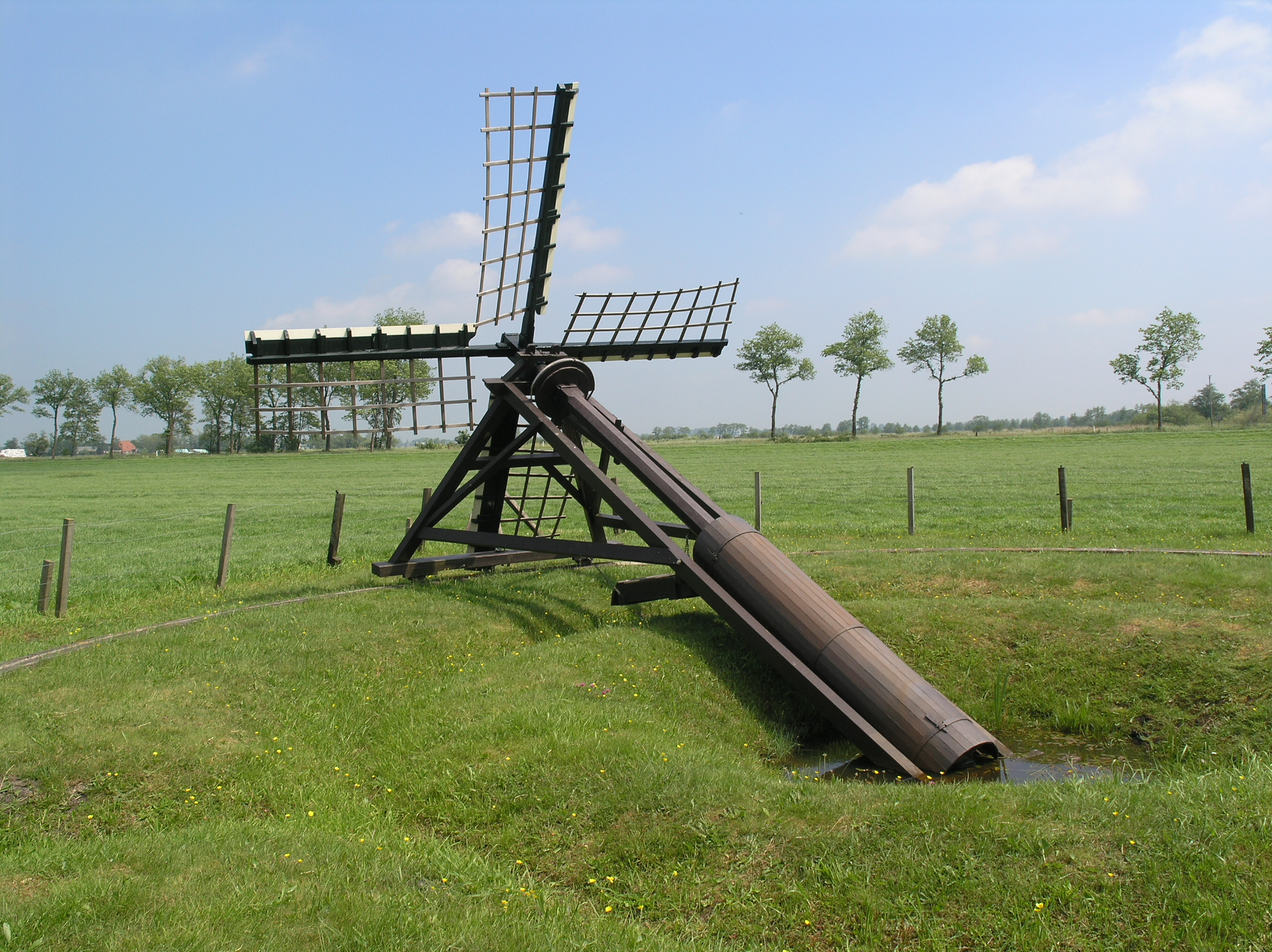
Tjasker Augustinusga, May 2007

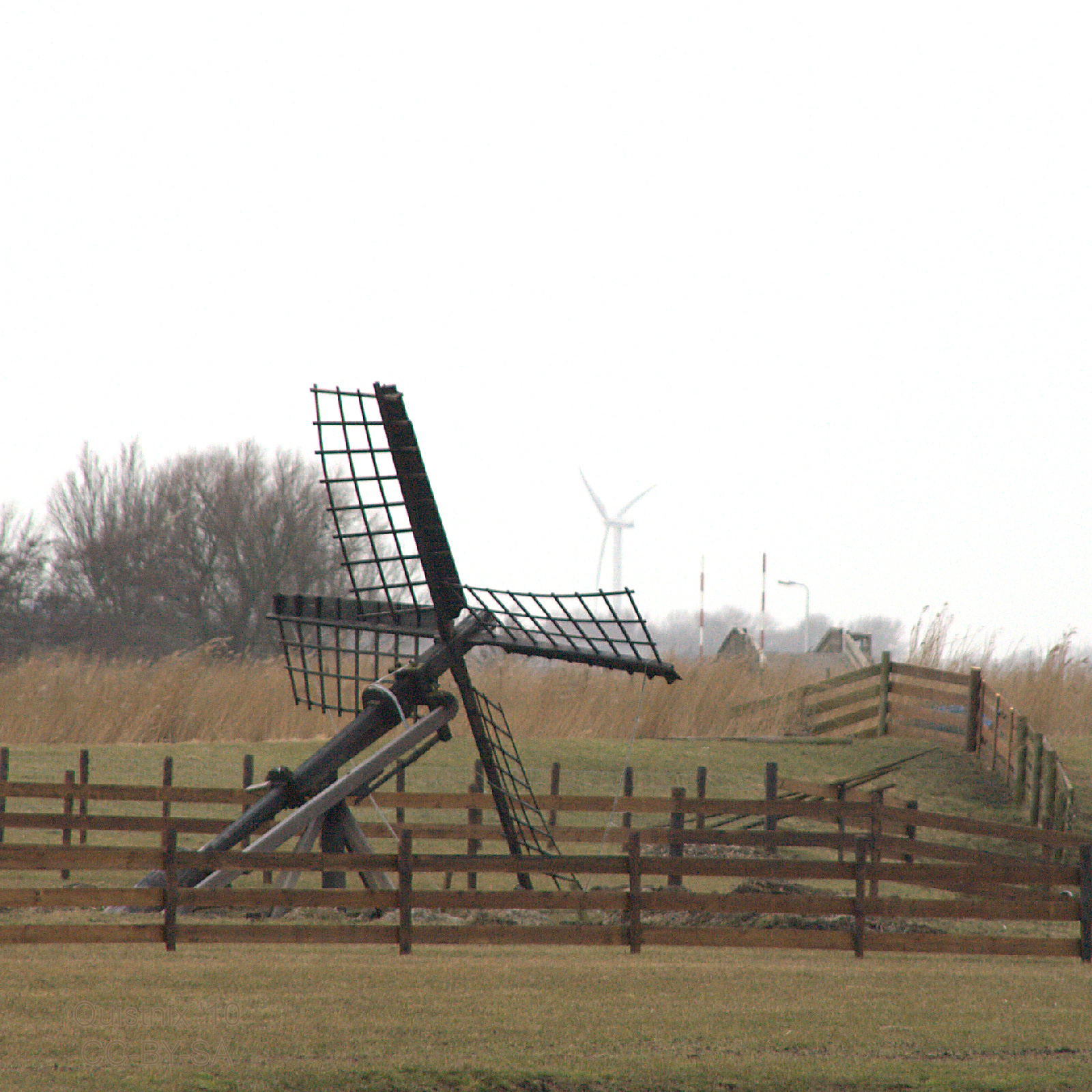
Tjasker Allingawier, March 2010

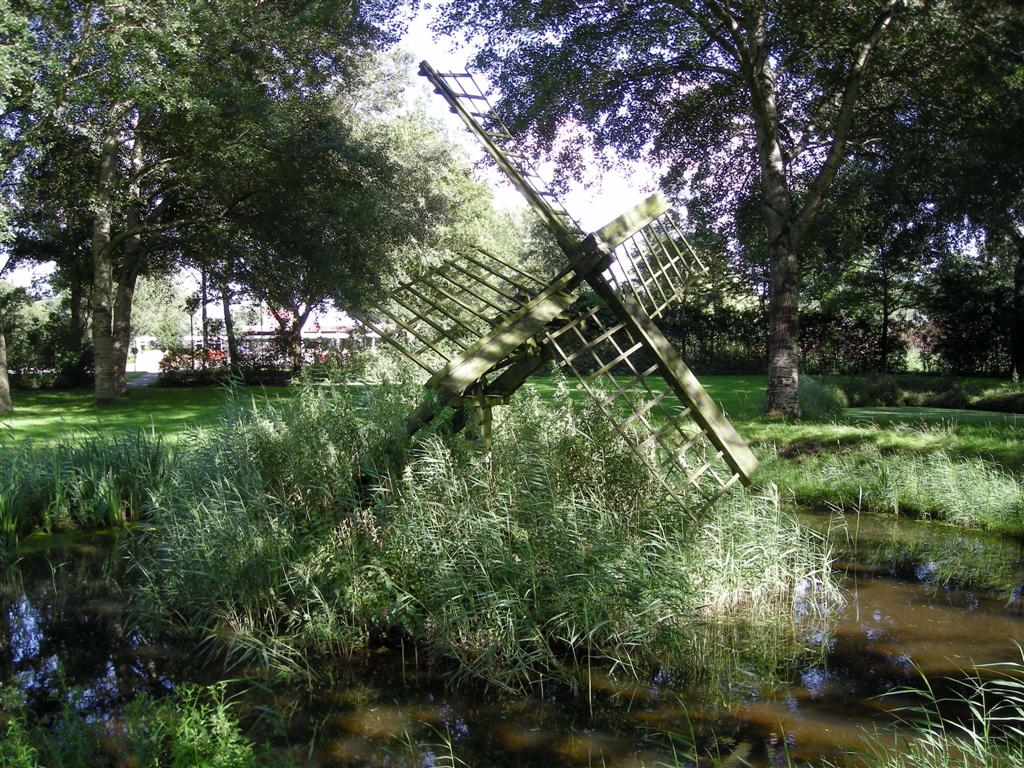
Tjasker Bolsward, July 2007

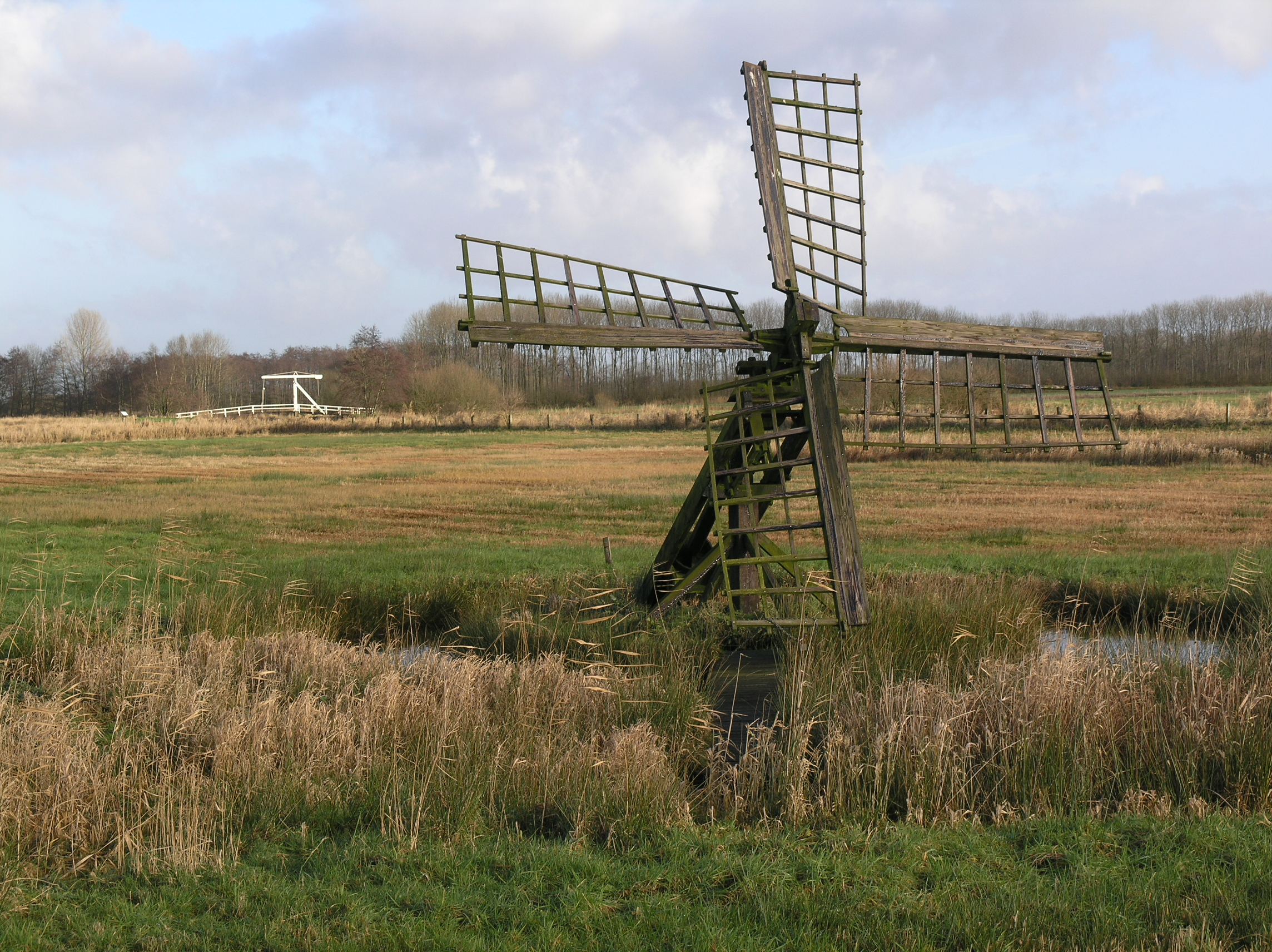
Tjasker De Hoeve, December 2005

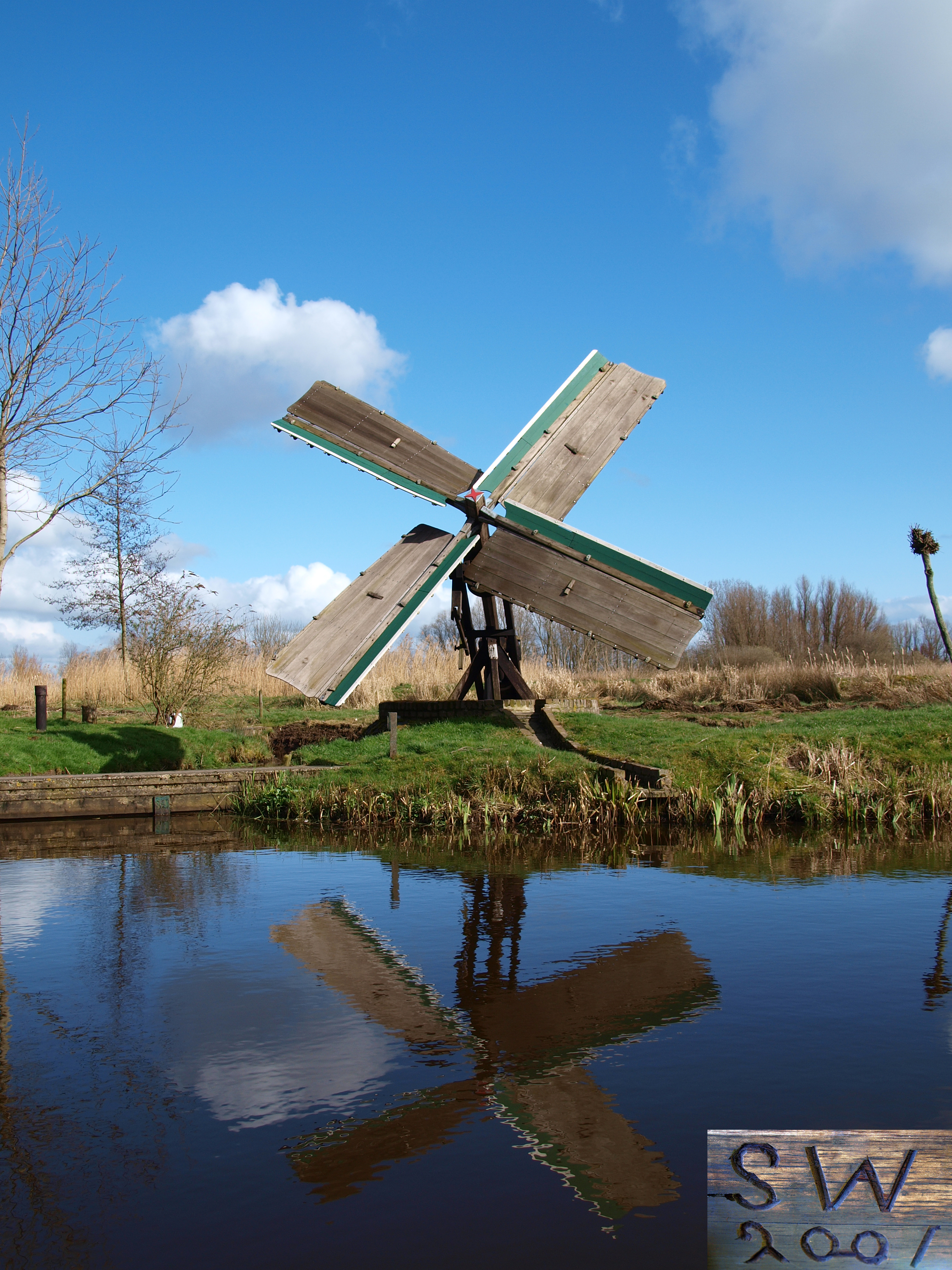
Tjasker Grou, March 2009

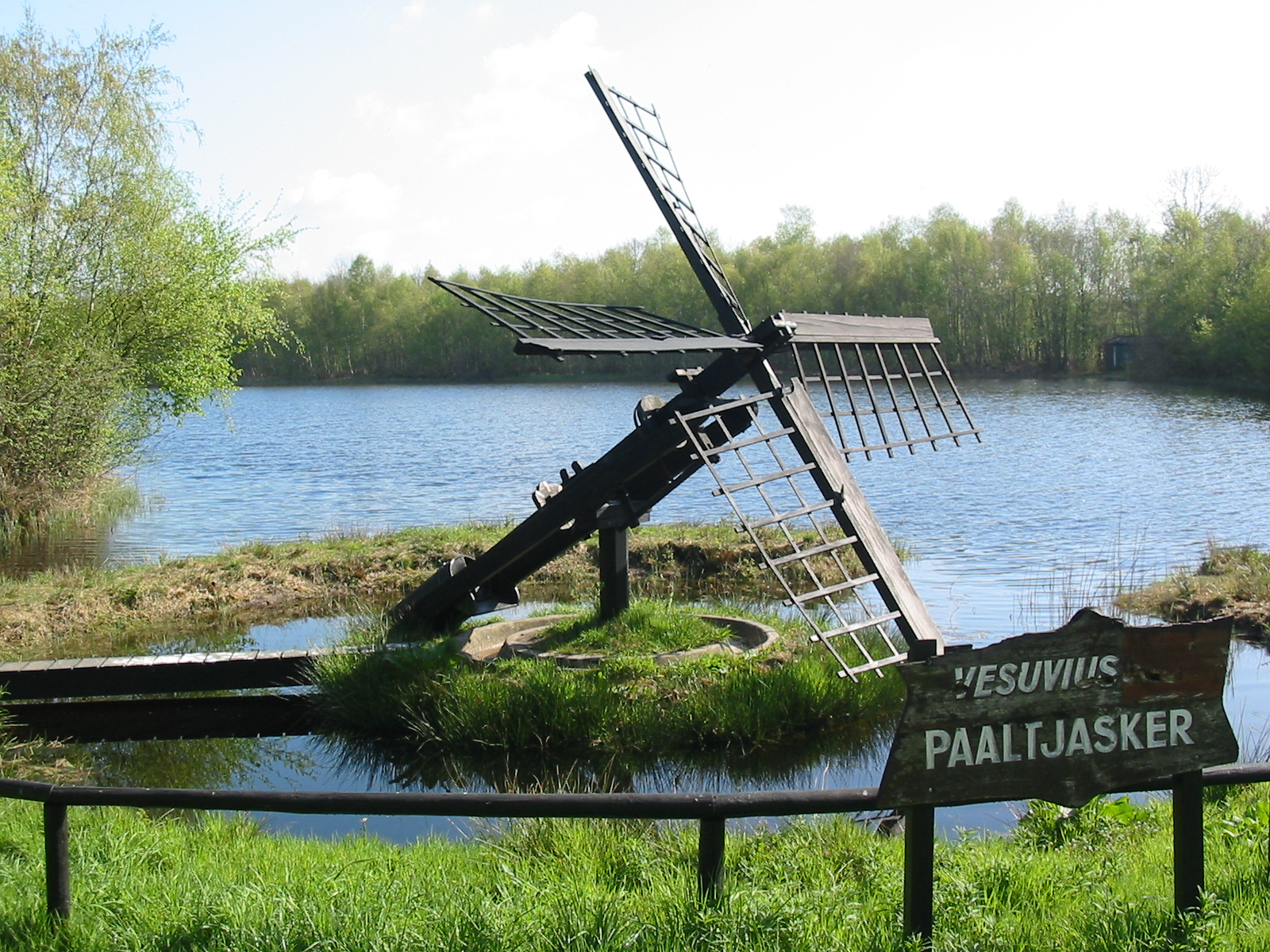
Tjasker Vesuvius, Elsloo, April 2004

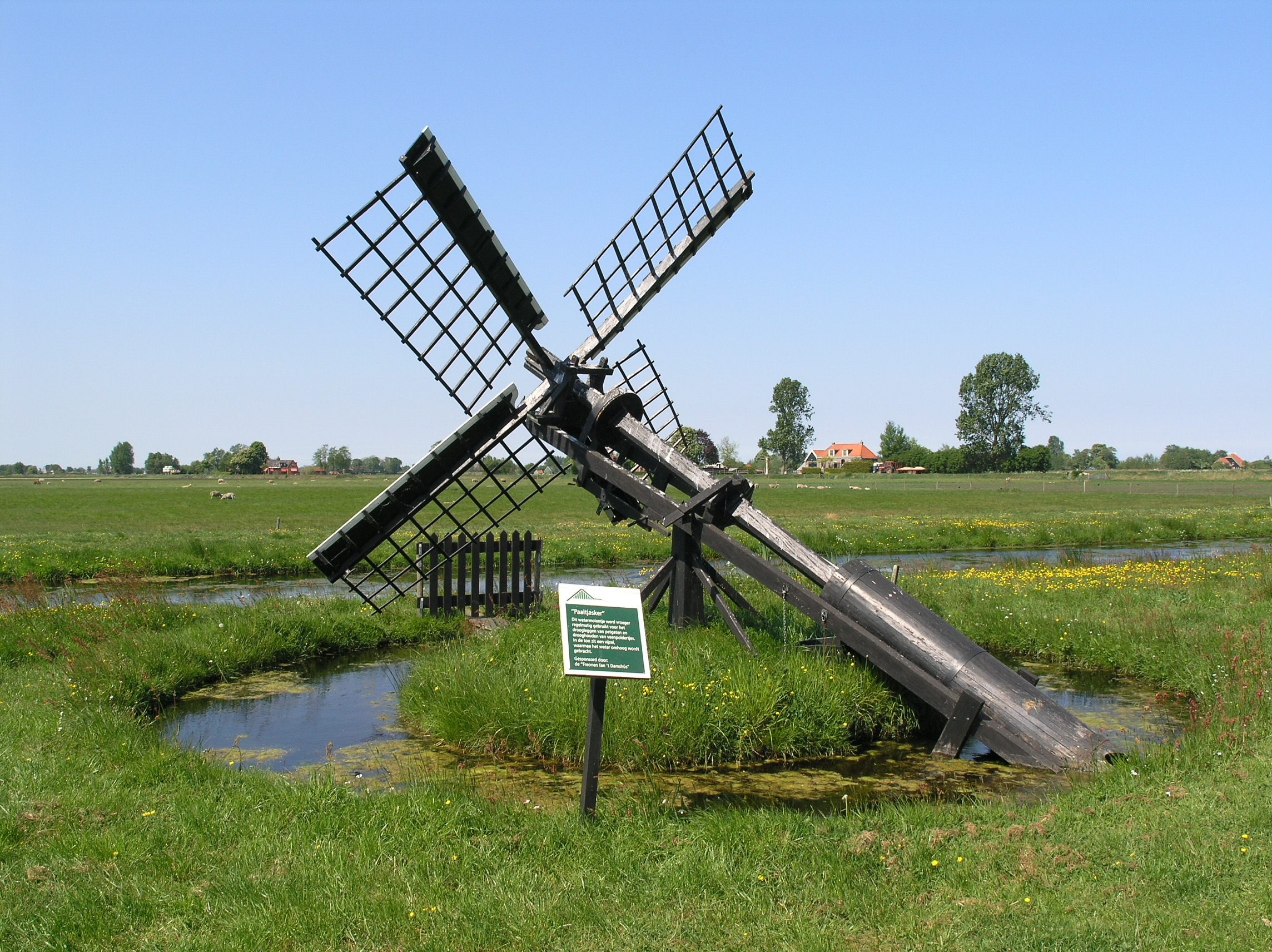
Tjasker Nij Beets, May 2007

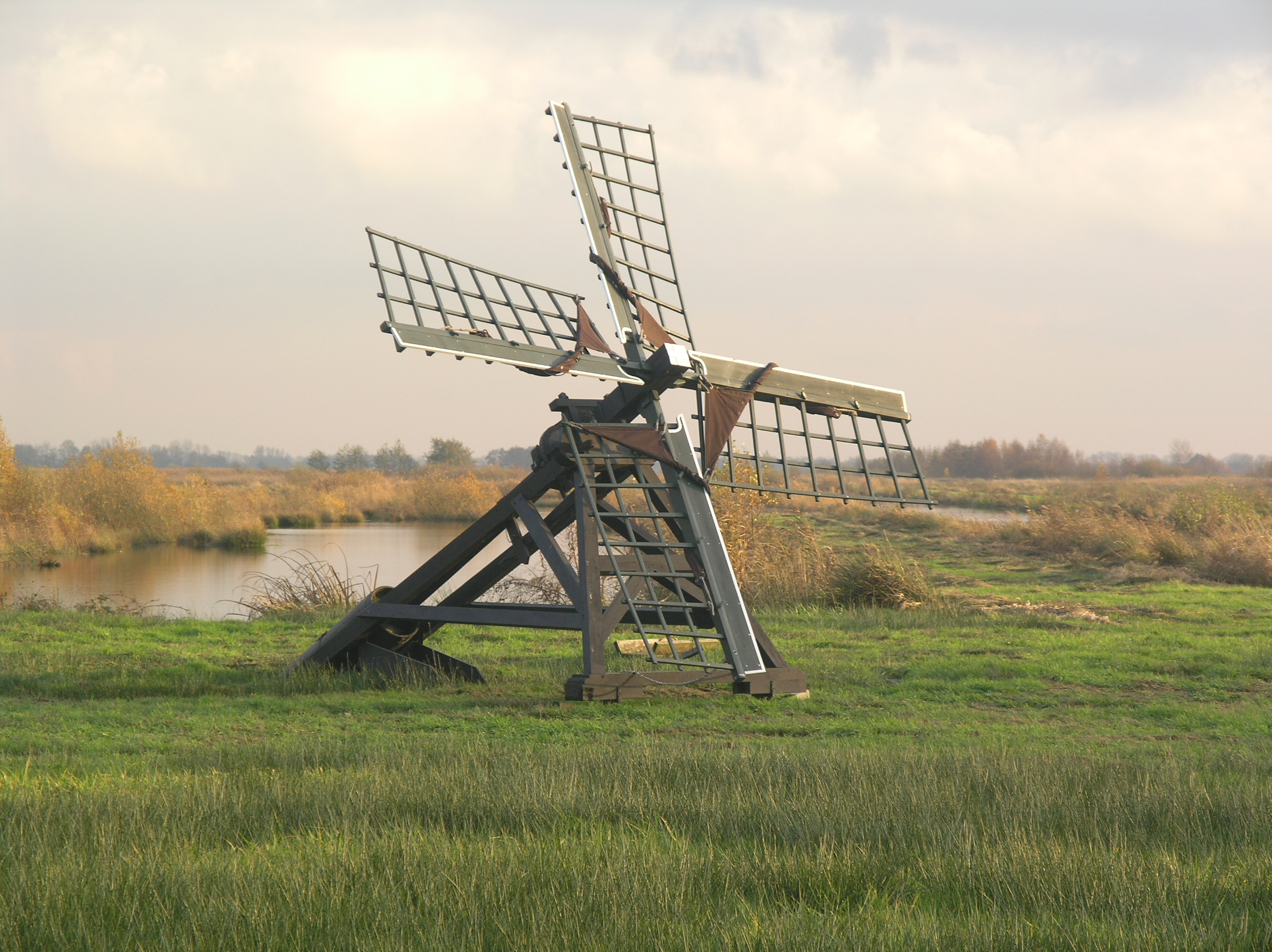
Tjasker Nijetrijne, November 2008

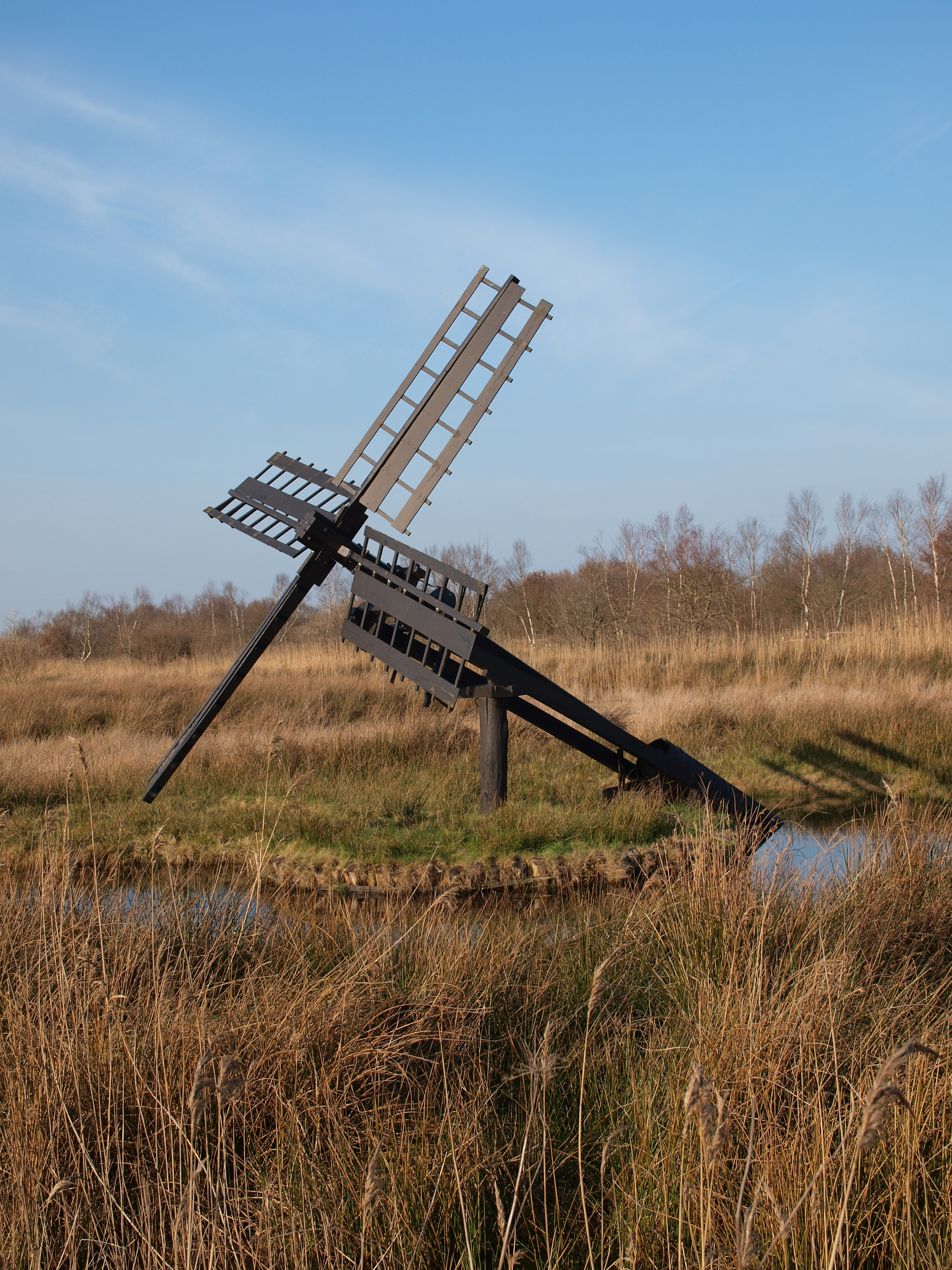
Tjasker De Deelen, March 2009

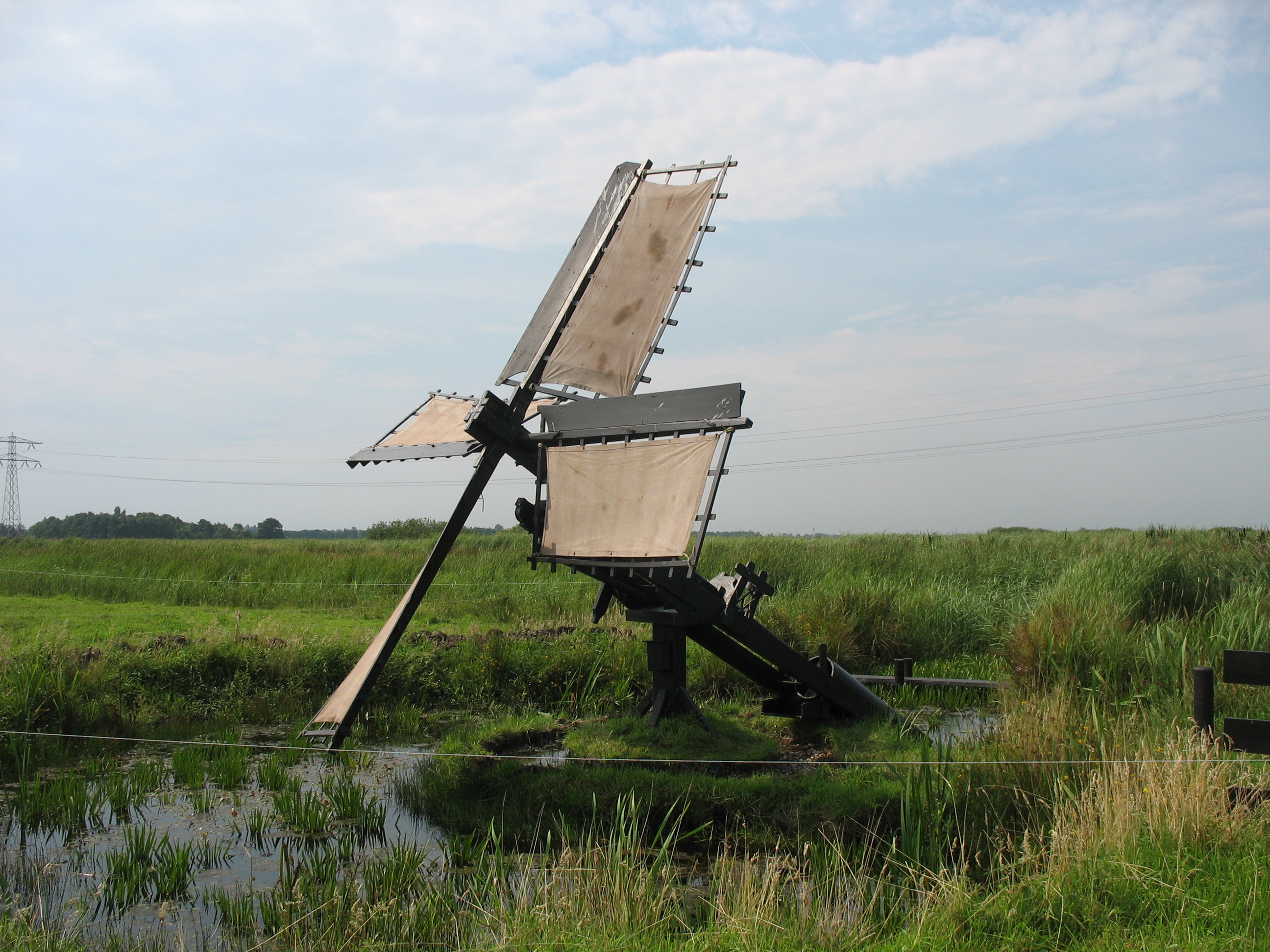
Tjasker Veenwouden, July 2008

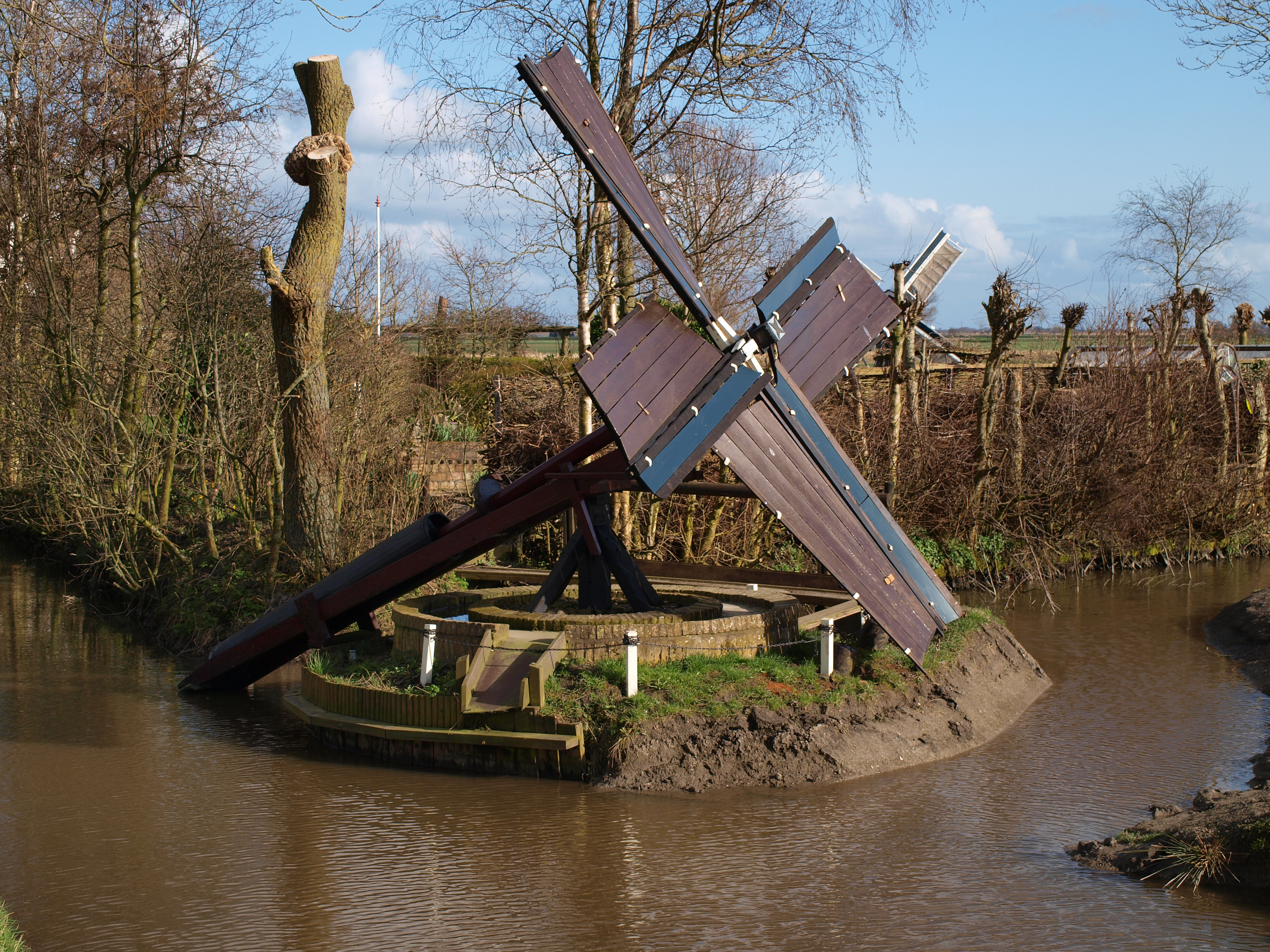
Tjasker Warga, March 2009

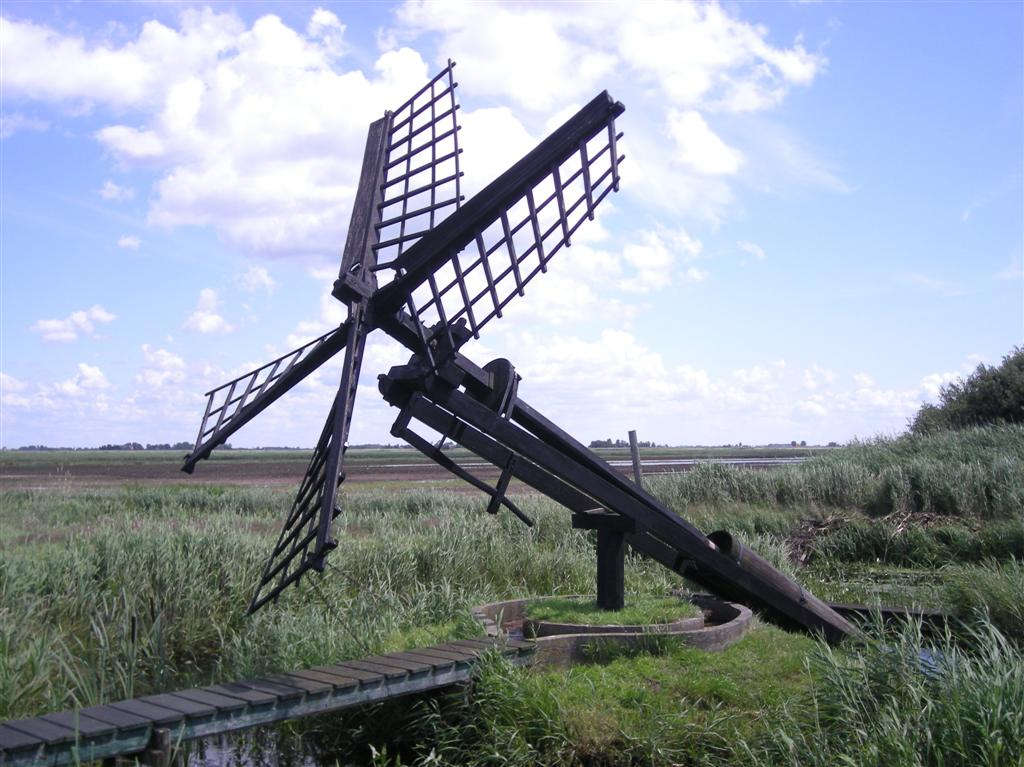
Tjasker Zandpoel, Wijckel, July 2007

=== Allingawier ===
Bij de Izeren Kou

53.048168°N 5.444736°E
The paaltjasker was built in 1970 in Allingawier and is part of the Aldfaers Erf Route, a route along museums in Allingawier, Exmorra and Piaam. The tjasker has four Common sails, which have a span of 5.45 metres (17 ft 11 in) and can pump water in a circuit. The tjasker is owned by Stichting Aldfears Erf and can be visited when the museum is open. The name is derived from the nearby farmhouse, also part of the museum, called De izeren kou (English: The iron cow).

=== Augustinusga ===
53.220870°N 6.175152°E
The boktjasker was at first located near Blessum where it drained a meadow. It was replaced by a metal windpump in 1954 and donated to the Friese Maatschappij voor de Landbouw Frisian Cooperation for Agriculture who restored it and erected it near Ryptsjerk though without making it functional. It was moved again in 1972 and now drains some plots of meadow north of Augustinusga. After 1972 it was also restored in 1988 and 2012. It is one of only three remaining boktjaskers. The Common sails have a span of 5.80 metres (19 ft 0 in). The tjasker is owned by municipally Achtkarspelen and can be easily reached on foot from the public road.

=== Bolsward ===
53.056815°N 5.535624°E
This paaltjasker was built in 1976 near a nursing home in Bolsward by the cousins Smid of Giethoorn who took over the assignment from well known tjasker builder R. W. Dijksma after his death. Though restored in 1988 it has since fallen into disrepair and is not in working order. The Common sails have a span of 5.20 metres (17 ft 1 in). Municipally Súdwest Fryslân is the owner.

=== De Hoeve ===
52.897514°N 6.077868°E
The paaltjasker was built in 1975 by the cousins Smit from Giethoorn taking over the assignment from Dijksma after his death. It was located east of Sneek. It was dismantled and put into storage in 1980 after it was damaged in a storm. The mill was restored and erected in a nature reserve of Staatsbosbeheer near De Hoeve in 1996 where it is used to raise water into the nature reserve. It is located near the river Linde and a recreational bicycle path.

=== Elsloo/Tronde ===
Vesuvius (Stobbepoel)

52.956891°N 6.232711°E
The paaltjasker was built around the end of the 19th century. It was rediscovered by association Vesuvius from Elsloo and restored to working order in 1978. Since then it is owned by Stichting De Fryske Mole and used to pump water into nature reserve De 'Stobbepoel'. The tjasker is listed as Rijksmonument number 386197. The Common sails are stored indoors during winter.

=== Grou ===
53.120747°N 5.845353°E
The paaltjasker was built in 2001 by S. Wobbes from Warstiens and erected by the owner E. Liezenga at his campsite near Grou.

=== It Heidenskip ===
52.959286°N 5.495885°E
The paaltjasker was built in 1915 by R.W. Dijksma as requested by farmer J. Noordenbos. It is the only tjasker in the Netherlands that has remained functional in its original location. It is situated between Workum and It Heidenskip and is in full working order. The tjasker has four Common sails, which have a span of 5.40 metres (17 ft 9 in) and can drain a plot of meadow land. The mill is private property and operated by volunteer millers.

=== Nij Beets ===
53.069823°N 5.996534°E
The paaltjasker was built in 2002 by a group of volunteers for open-air museum It Damshûs in Nij Beets. The museum shows aspects of the former peat industry and the mill can be used to regulate the water level in the peat extraction pit. The tjasker can be visited during opening hours of the museum.

=== Nijetrijne ===
52.841296°N 5.907472°E
The boktjasker was at first built in 1967 and drained nature reserve De Bonne Brekken in Wijckel. It was damaged in a storm in 2001 and dismantled. The remnants were left in storage until the mill was restored in 2007 and re-erected in nature reserve De Rottige Meenthe. The tjasker is owned by Staatsbosbeheer and pumps water between two former peat extraction pits. The four Common sails have a span of 5.40 metres (17 ft 9 in). It is one of only three remaining boktjaskers.

=== Tijnje ===
De Deelen

53.023468°N 5.918086°E
The paaltjasker was built in 1973 by R.W. Dijksma as the fifth in a 'new' series of post-war tjaskers and placed in nature reserve De Deelen, west of Tijnje. The mill is owned by Staatsbosbeheer and can be used to pump water into the nature reserve. The four symmetrical Common sails have a span of 5.28 metres (17 ft 4 in) and are covered by wooden slats instead of sail cloth.

=== Veenwouden ===
53.255977°N 5.997901°E
The paaltjasker was built for Staatsbosbeheer in 1975. Tjaskerbuilder Roelof Dijksma died during its construction and the mill was finished by the cousins Smid. It lost its function and was dismantled and restored in 1996 but not re-erected until 2005 in the same nature reserve De Houtwiel near Veenwouden but in a different location. Though operational it has no real function, instead it pumps water in a circuit. The four Common sails have a span of 5 metres (16 ft 5 in).

=== Wergea ===
53.155727°N 5.850402°E
The paaltjasker was built by owner Sieds Wobbes in 1996 and is located at his home in Warstiens near Wergea. Though operational it has no real function, instead it pumps water in a circuit.

=== Wijckel ===
De Zandpoel / Sânpoel

52.874114°N 5.624846°E
The paaltjasker was built in 1975 for Staatsbosbeheer to pump water into nature reserve De Zandpoel near Wijckel. The windshaft has an extra support bearing just above the Archimedes' screw. The mill is located near a small rest stop on the N359 road between Lemmer and Sondel.

== Dutch Wikipedia articles ==
- Tjasker Allingawier
- Tjasker Augustinusga
- Tjasker Bolsward
- Tjasker De Hoeve
- Tjasker Vesuvius, Elsloo
- Tjasker Grouw
- Tjasker It Heidenskip
- Tjasker Nij Beets
- Tjasker Nijetrijne
- Tjasker De Deelen, Tijnje
- Tjasker Veenwouden
- Tjasker Warga
- Tjasker Zandpoel, Wijckel
