= Balk, Netherlands =

Balk
- Village
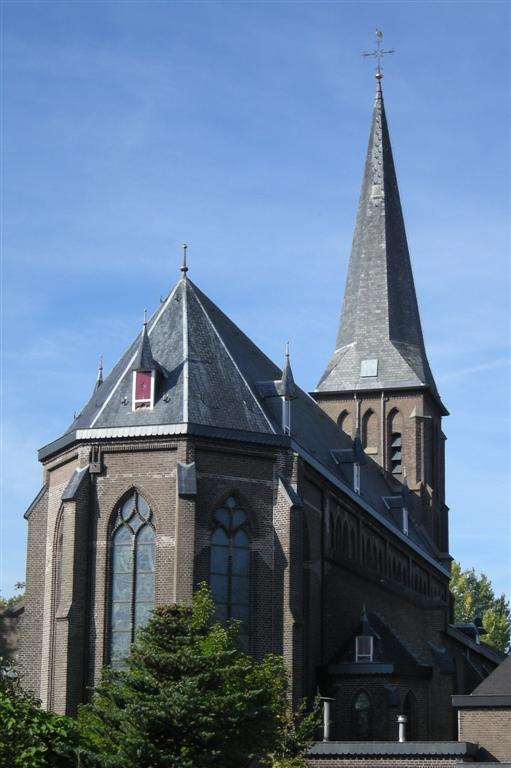
- St Ludger Church

- Flag Coat of arms

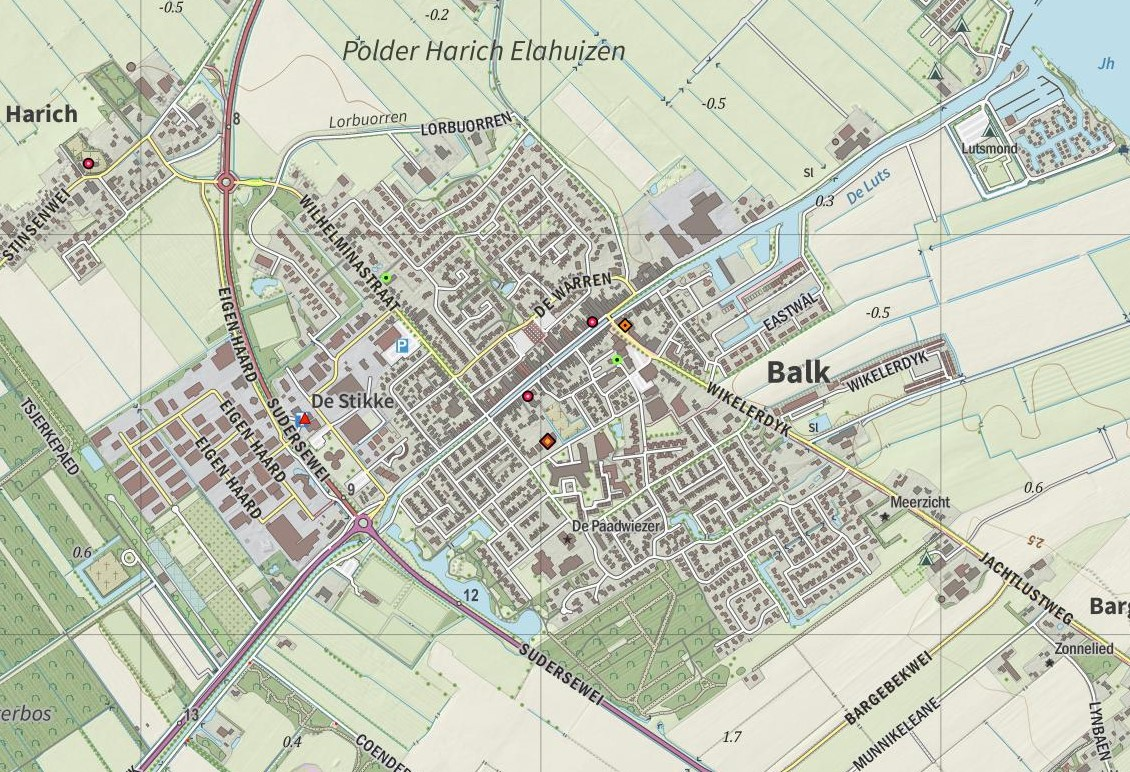
- Map of Balk

- Location in the Netherlands
- Coordinates: 52°53′45″N 5°34′55″E
- Country: Netherlands
- Province: Friesland
- Municipality: De Fryske Marren

Population (2024)
  - Total: 4,340
- Time zone: UTC+1 (CET)
  - Summer (DST): UTC+2 (CEST)
- Postal code: 8561
- Telephone area: 0514

Balk (Dutch pronunciation: [ˈbɑl(ə)k]) is a town in the northern Netherlands. It is a village of the municipality De Fryske Marren, province Friesland, and is located about 17 km southwest of Sneek.

In 2024 Balk had 4,340 inhabitants.

== Geography ==
Balk lies between Harich and Wijckel. The Luts river flows through the village. It is said that it arose where a beam was over the river, that is why the village is called Balk because it means beam in Frisian and Dutch.

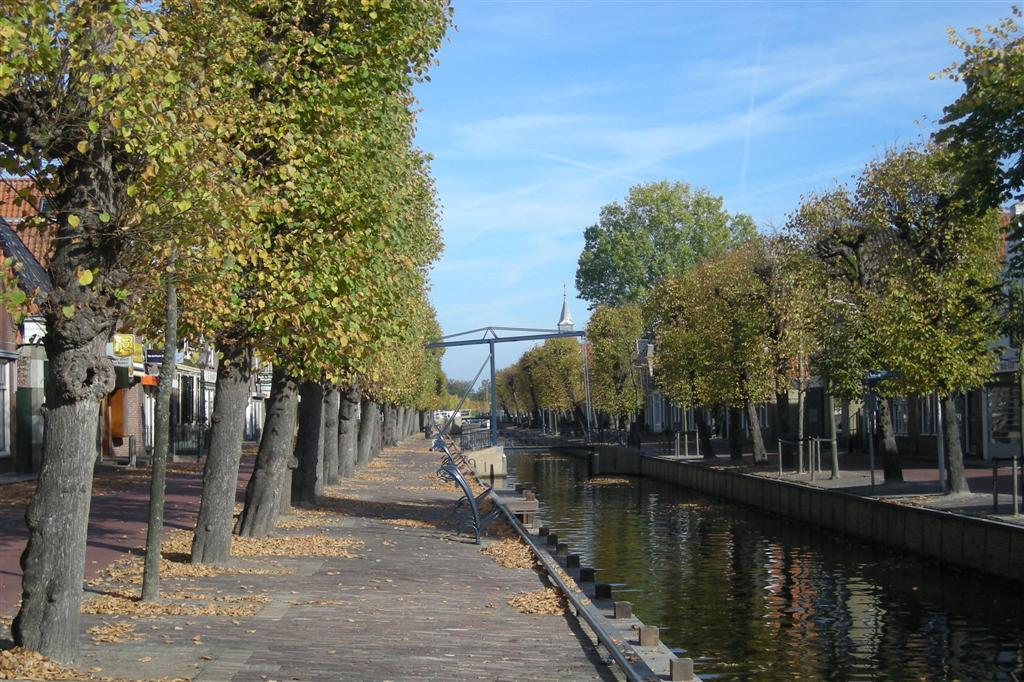
The river Luts in Balk

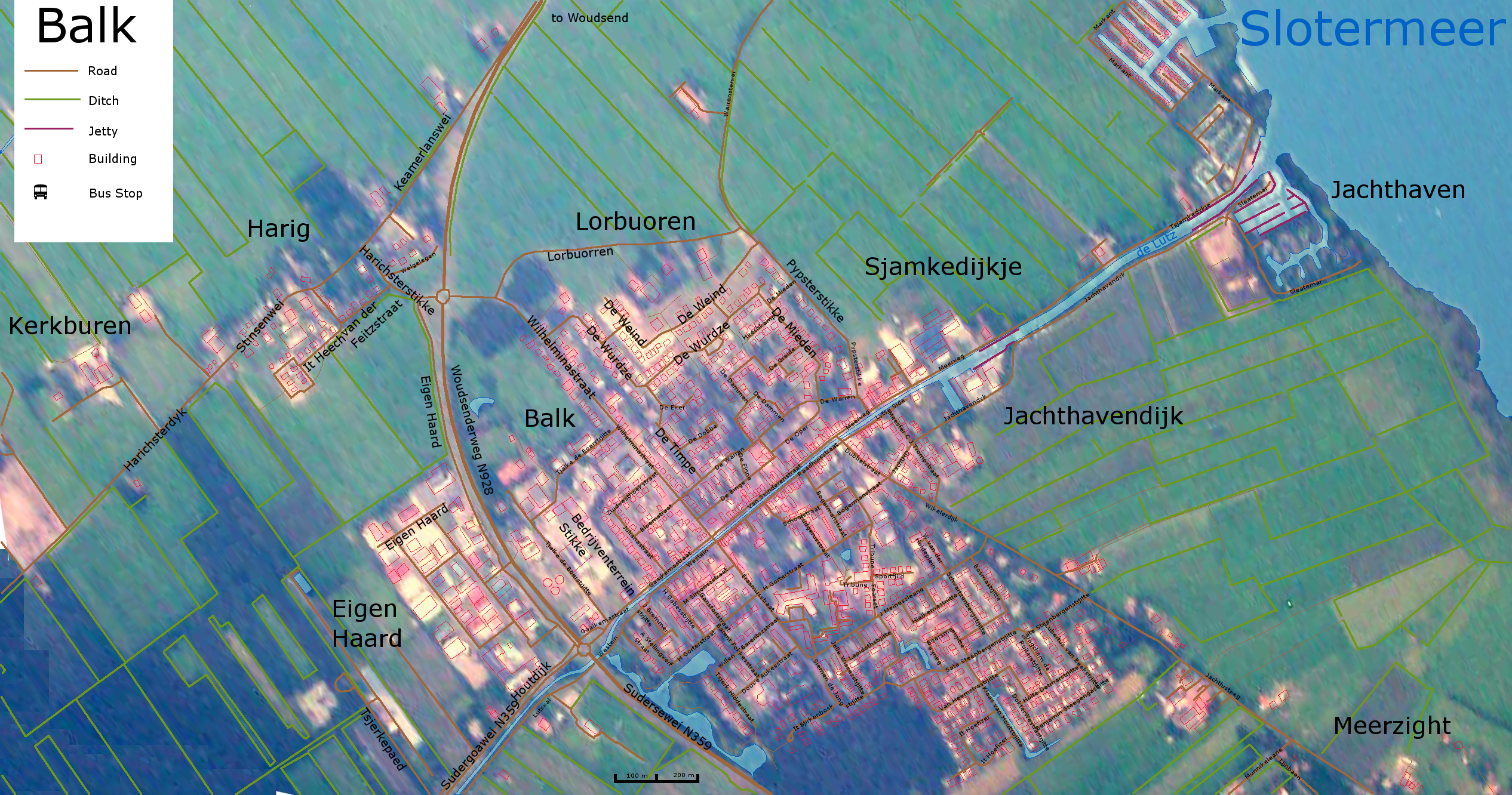
Detailed map of Balk

== History ==
At first Balk was a part of Harich. In 1585 Spanish soldiers from Groningen plundered Balk. In the 18th century Balk became wealthy due to the butter trade and in the 19th century it had become a village of its own.

== Religion ==
Balk had various faith communities from in the beginning. One of them was the community of the Mennonites who were very strict in their beliefs. In the middle of the 19th century a big group emigrated to America to settle themselves there near Goshen, Indiana

The biggest faith community in Balk is protestantism. The protestant community has about 1800 members and has two churches; a monumental church at the Luts and since 1982 a new church. In the village there is also a catholic parish with a church devoted to Sint Ludgerus.

== Culture ==
The village and the river are said to have inspired the poet Herman Gorter to his famous poem 'Mei' in which Gorter does not speak of a village and a river but of a small city and a canal:

Een nieuwe lente en een nieuw geluid
Ik wil dat dit lied klinkt als het gefluit
Dat ik vaak hoorde voor een zomernacht
In een oud stadje, langs de watergracht.

As a memorial there is a statue of the poet. Balk further has a historical centre with a town hall from 1615.

In Balk and its surroundings there is a newspaper: the Balkster Courant

Balk has 33 national monuments (Rijksmonument).

== Water sports ==
Balk is a centre of water sports. To the Luts there is sailing school de Ulepanne, multiple winner of the dutch sailing schools championships. On the edge of the Sleatermar there is a big yacht harbor. For cyclists and sailors there is a traditional skûtsje as a sailing ferry between Heeg and Balk. In the wintermonths the berenburgcup (sailing) is held on the Slotermeer from Balk.

== Public transport ==
Bus (Qbuzz):

- Line 41: Heerenveen • Joure • Scharsterbrug • Sint Nicolaasga • Spannenburg • Tjerkgaast • Sloten • Wijckel • Balk • Lemmer
- Line 44: Sneek • Jutrijp • Hommerts • Woudsend • Balk • Sondel • Nijemirdum • Oudemirdum • Rijs • Hemelum • Koudum • Workum • Parrega • Tjerkwerd • Bolsward

== Born ==
- Jetze Doorman (1881−1931), fencer
- Frans Haarsma (1921−2009), priest
- Johannes van Hout (1905−1972), mayor
