= Gaasterlân-Sleat =

Gaasterlân-Sleat Gaasterland-Sloten
- Former municipality
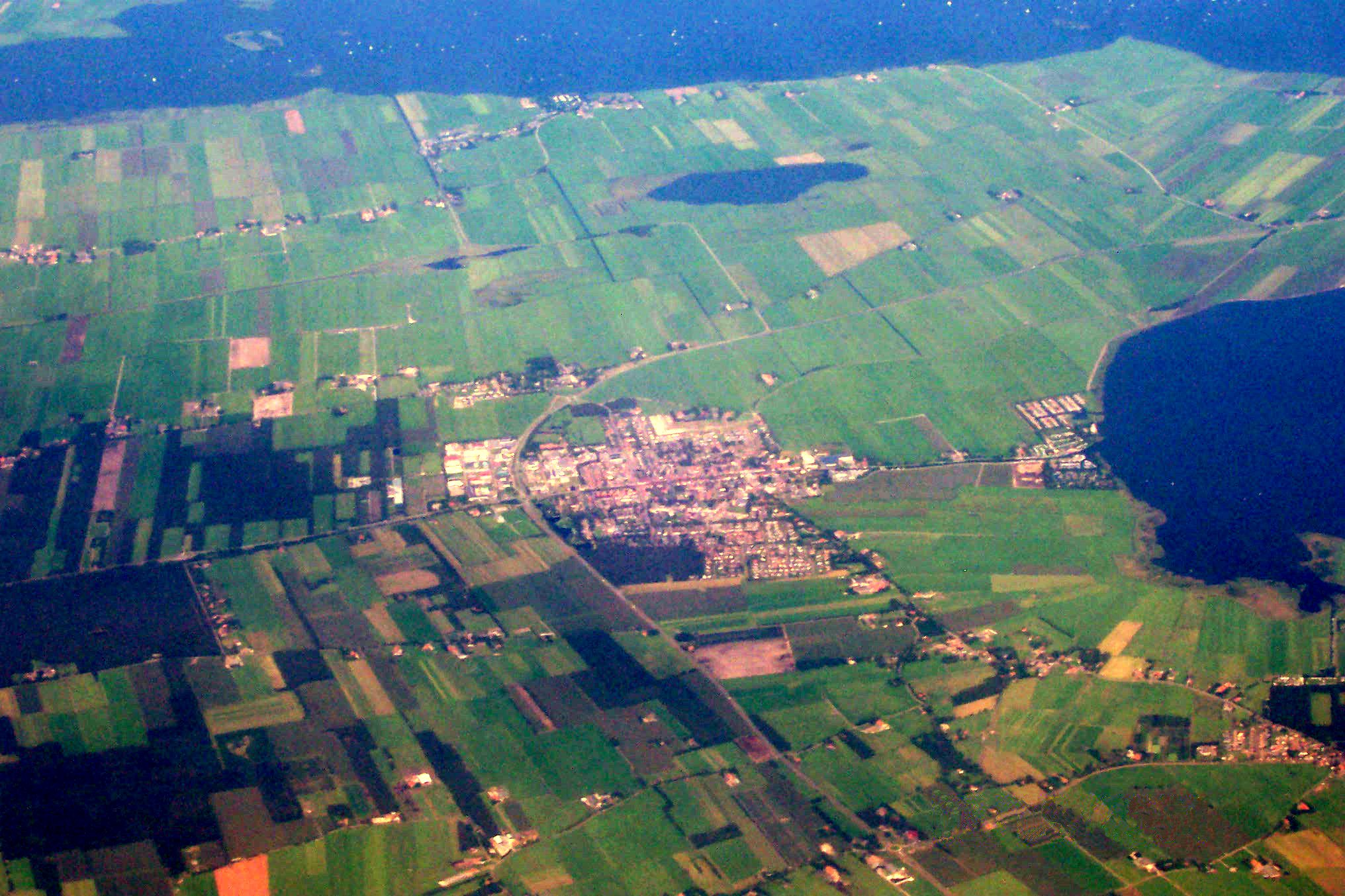
- Aerial photo of Balk

- Flag Coat of arms

- Location in Friesland
- Coordinates: 52°54′N 5°35′E
- Country: Netherlands
- Province: Friesland
- Established: 1 January 1984
- Dissolved: 1 January 2014

Area
  - Total: 209.34 km^{2} (80.83 sq mi)
  - Land: 95.24 km^{2} (36.77 sq mi)
  - Water: 114.10 km^{2} (44.05 sq mi)
- Elevation: 1 m (3.3 ft)

Population (November 2013)
  - Total: 10,186
  - Density: 107/km^{2} (280/sq mi)
- Time zone: UTC+1 (CET)
  - Summer (DST): UTC+2 (CEST)
- Postcode: 8556–8583
- Area code: 0514

Gaasterlân-Sleat is a former municipality in the northern Netherlands. Its official name is in West Frisian, the Dutch name being Gaasterland-Sloten (pronounced [ˌɣaːstərlɑnt ˈsloːtə(n)]). In 2014 it merged with the municipalities of Lemsterland and Skarsterlân to form the new municipality De Fryske Marren.

== Population centres ==
Bakhuizen, Balk, Elahuizen, Harich, Kolderwolde, Mirns, Nijemirdum, Oudega, Oudemirdum, Rijs, Ruigahuizen, Sloten, Sondel and Wijckel.

== Demographics ==
In 2010

- Dutch: 94.3%
- Black: 0.4%
- European: 4.0%
- Arabs: 0.2%
- Other non Western: 1.1%:
