= Nijemirdum =

Nijemirdum Nijemardum
- Village
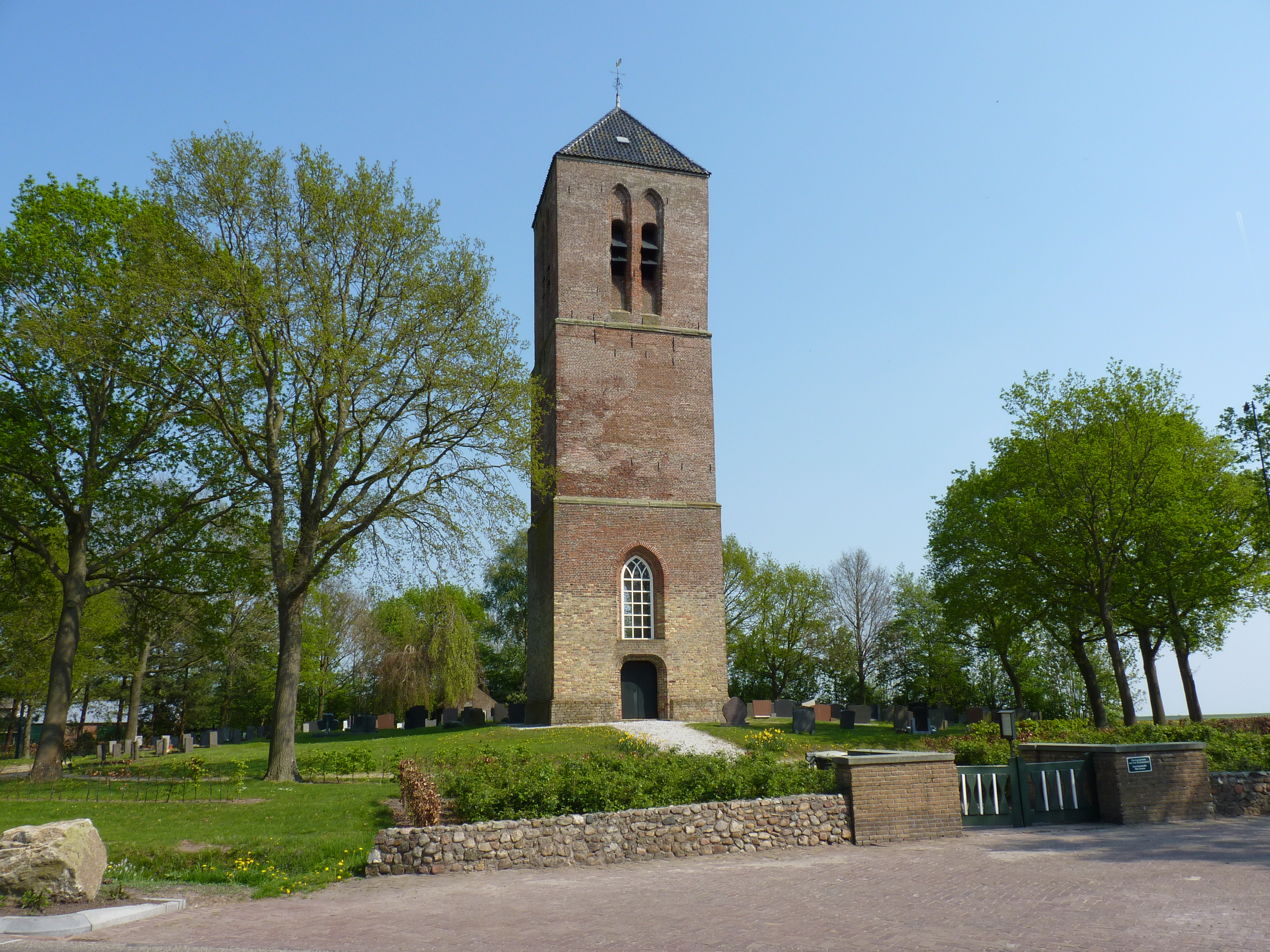
- Nijemirdum tower

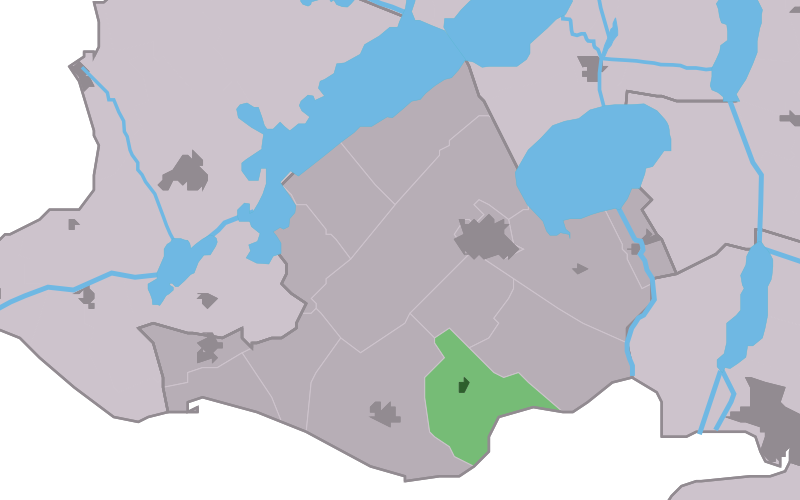
- Location in the former Gaasterlân Sleat municipality

- Location in the Netherlands Nijemirdum (Netherlands)
- Country: Netherlands
- Province: Friesland
- Municipality: De Fryske Marren

Area
  - Total: 7.58 km^{2} (2.93 sq mi)
- Elevation: 1 m (3.3 ft)

Population (2021)
  - Total: 570
  - Density: 75/km^{2} (190/sq mi)
- Time zone: UTC+1 (CET)
  - Summer (DST): UTC+2 (CEST)
- Postal code: 8566
- Dialing code: 0514
- Website: Official

Nijemirdum (West Frisian: Nijemardum) is a village in De Fryske Marren municipality in the province of Friesland, the Netherlands, with a population of around 555 as of 2004.

There is a windmill in the village: 't Zwaantje, which is a monument.

== History ==
The village was first mentioned in 1399 as Nuwe Merden. It uses Nije (new) to distinguish from Oudemirdum. The name "Mirdum" is thought to have originated from the Frisian word "mer" (lake), possibly referring to the nearby Mirnserklif cliffs overlooking the IJsselmeer. The church dates from 1898, however there is a tower in the cemetery which dates from the 14th century. In 1516, the church which belonged to the tower was destroyed by the Burgundians. It was rebuilt, but became derelict in 1702 and was later demolished.In 1840, it was home to 131 people.

Before 2014, Nijemirdum was part of the Gaasterlân-Sleat municipality and before 1984 it was part of Gaasterland.

== Gallery ==
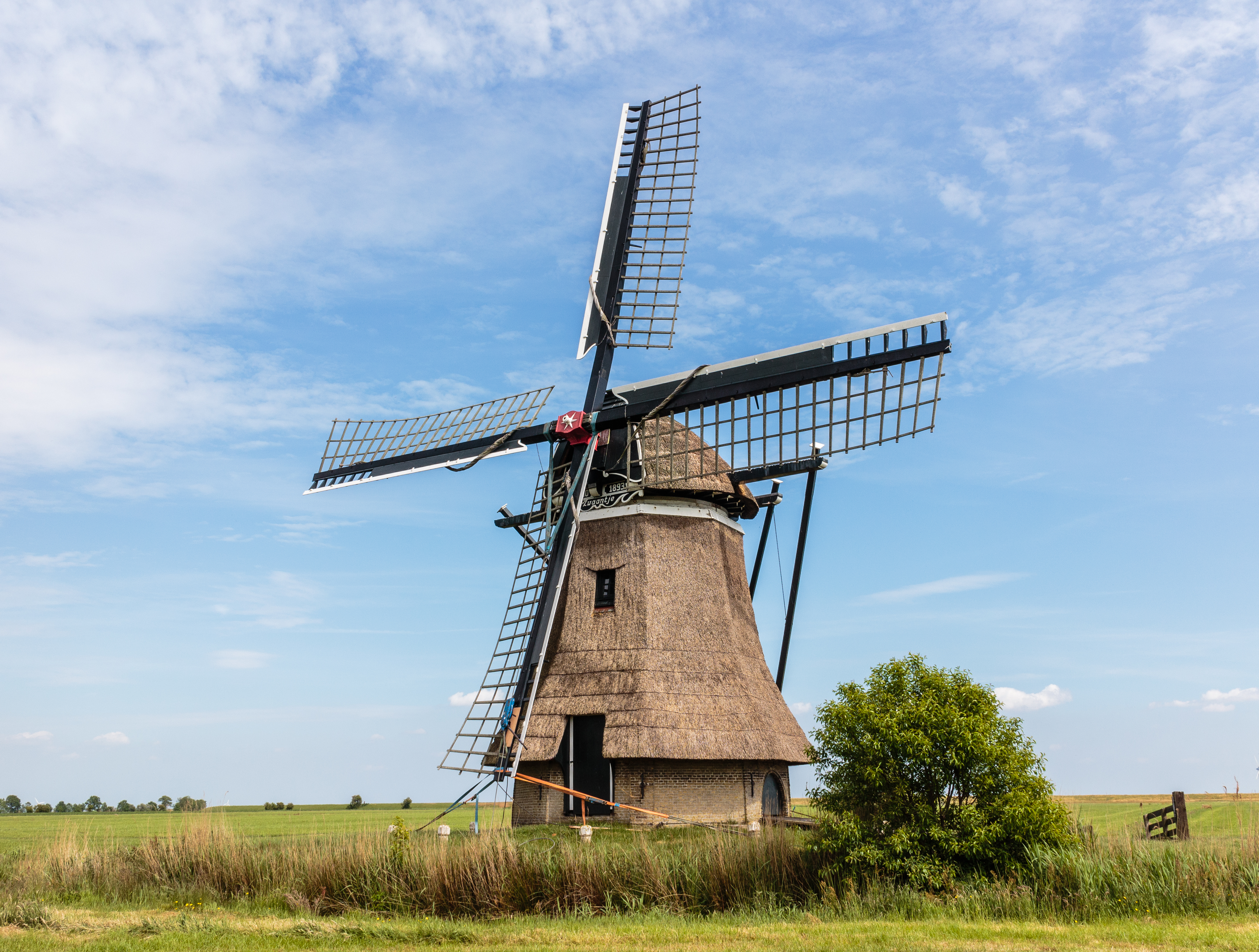
't Zwaantje

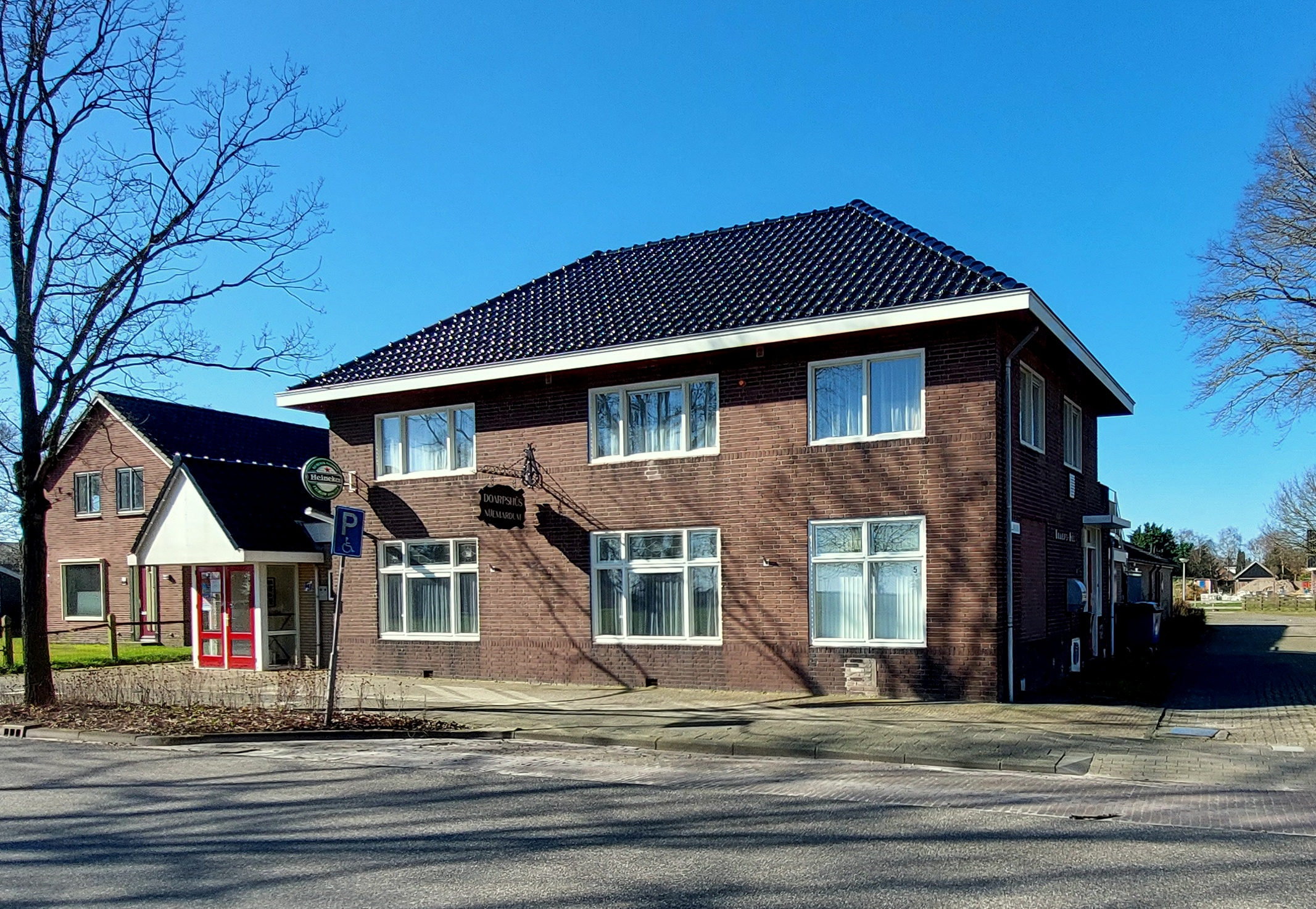
Village house

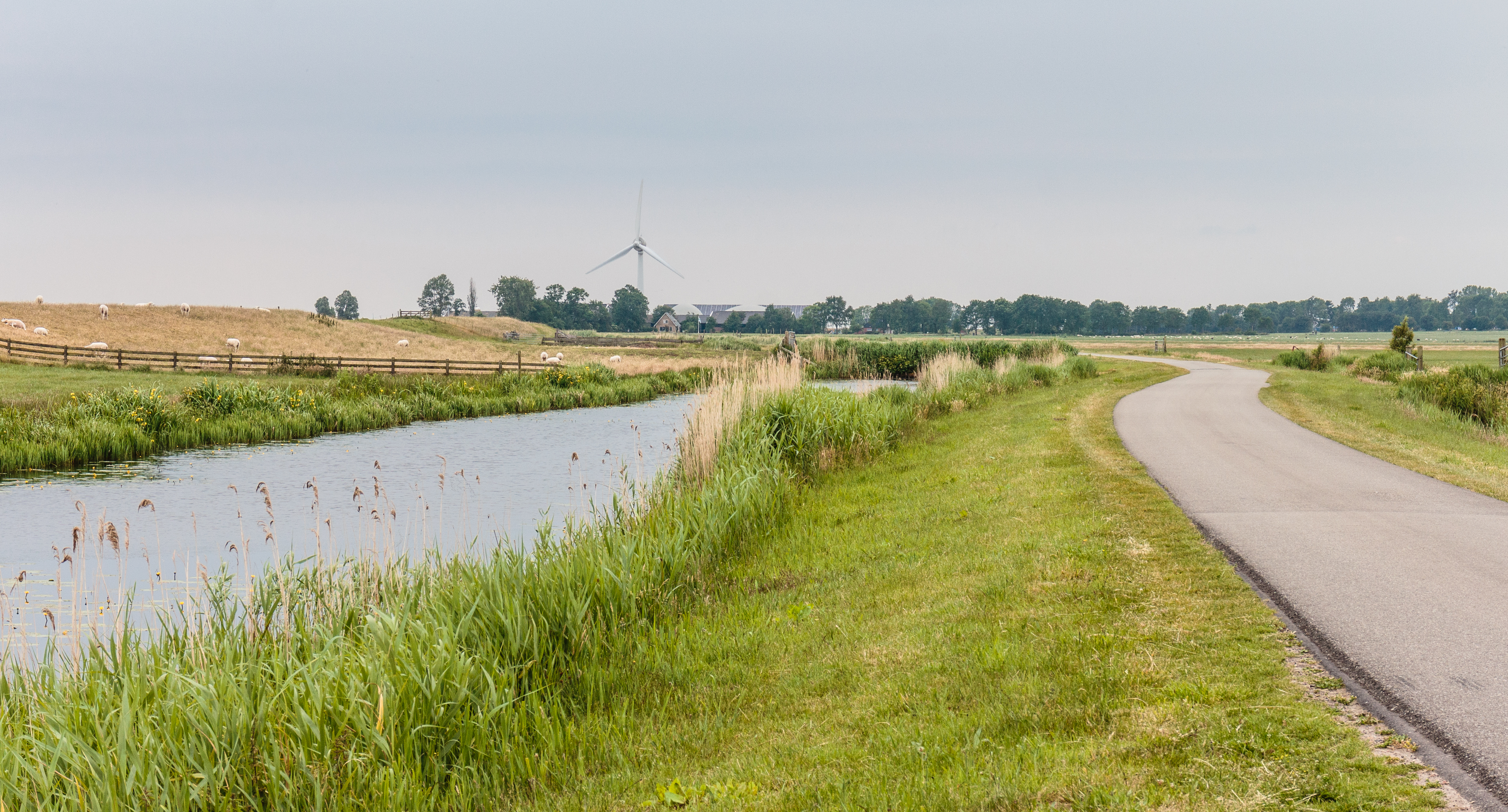
Landscape

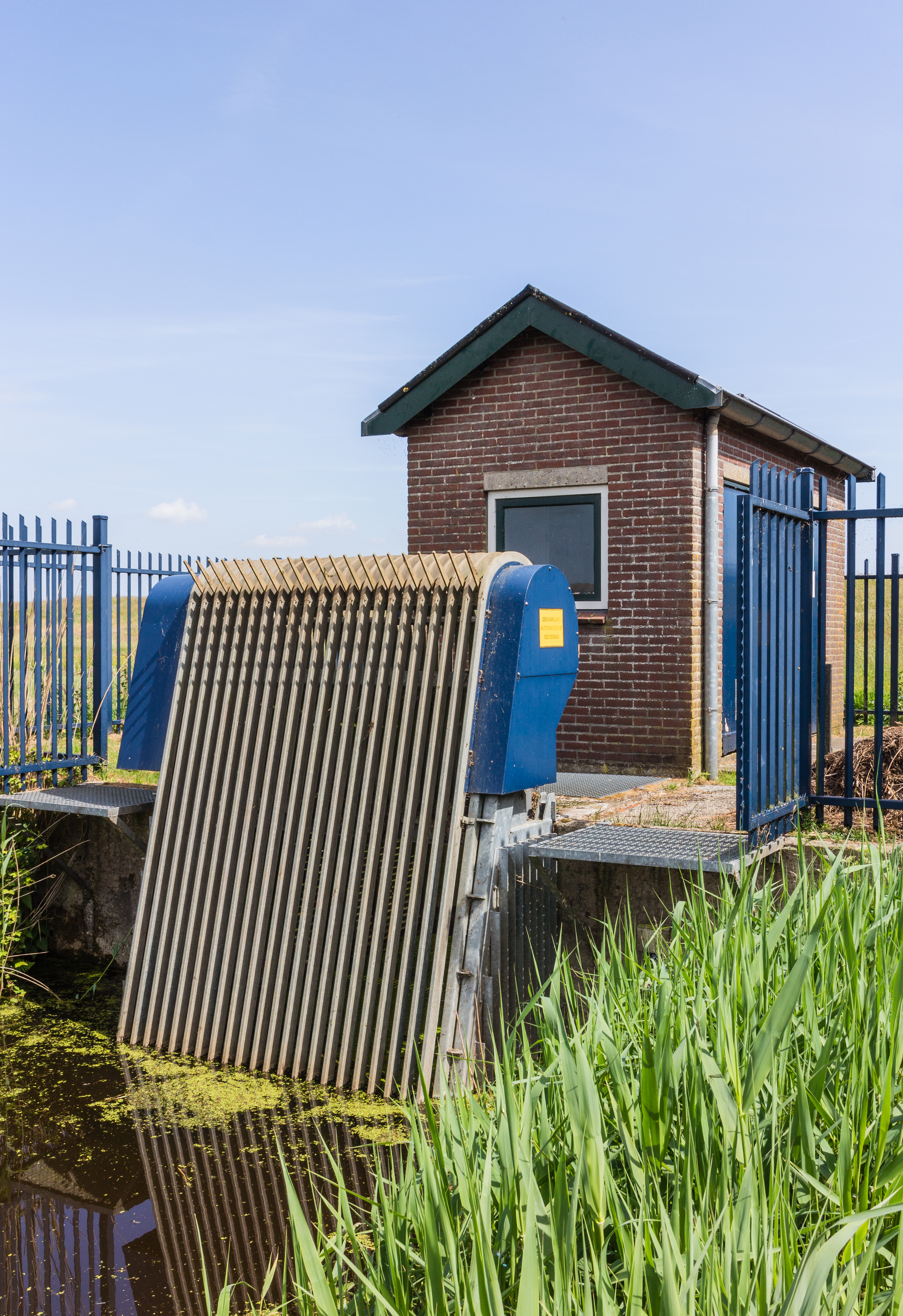
Pumping station
