= 't Zwaantje, Nijemirdum =

Smock mill in the Netherlands

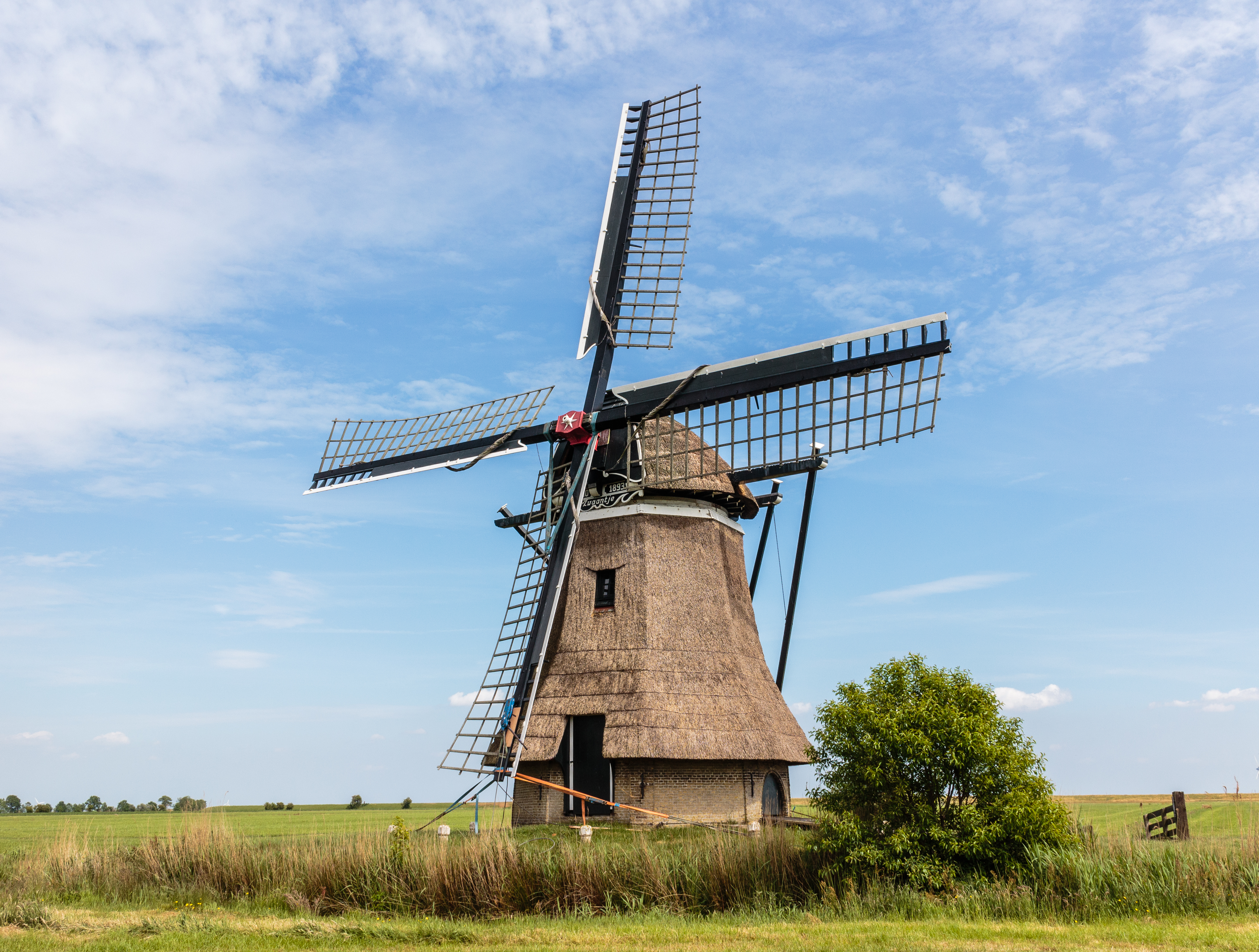
- 't Zwaantje (The Little Swan), a smock mill in Nijemirdum, Friesland, Netherlands

Origin
- Mill name: 't Zwaantje
- Mill location: Nabij Sânfeardyk 1, 8566 JP Nijemirdum
- Coordinates: 52°50′56″N 5°34′25″E
- Operator(s): Stichting De Fryske Mole
- Year built: 1878

Information
- Purpose: Drainage mill
- Type: Smock mill
- Storeys: Two storey smock
- Base storeys: Single storey base
- Smock sides: Eight sides
- No. of sails: Four sails
- Type of sails: Common sails
- Windshaft: Cast iron
- Winding: Tailpole and winch
- Type of pump: Archimedes screw

't Zwaantje (English: The Little Swan) is a smock mill in Nijemirdum, Friesland, Netherlands which was built in 1878. The mill has been restored to working order. It is listed as a Rijksmonument.

== History ==
The mill was probably built in 1878, replacing an earlier mill that had been built c.1790 and had burnt down. Draining the Huitebuurster polder, it was formerly named De Huitebuurstermolen, only being renamed 't Zwaantje in 1987. In 1956, the mill was partly dismantled and a Lister diesel engine was installed to pump water. The mill was restored in 1986 by Messrs Waghenbrugghe of Sneek, Friesland. The restoration incorporated the sails, windshaft, brake wheel and Archimedes' screw from De Noordster (English: The North Star), Nieuwe Bildtdijk, which had been demolished in 1984. It was thought that De Noordster only dated from 1936, and thus it was not listed as a Rijksmonument. This was an error, as the mill actually dated from 1818; 1936 being the date that the leading edges of the sails were fitted with Dekkerised leading edges. 't Zwaantje was capable of draining or pumping water into the polder. The mill was restored in 1987.

't Zwaantje was sold to Stichting De Fryske Mole on 1 January 1996, the 47th mill acquired by that organisation. A further restoration took place in 2007. The mill is listed as a Rijksmonument, No. 358041.

== Description ==
't Zwaantje is what the Dutch describe as a Grondzeiler. It is a two-storey smock mill on a single-storey brick base. There is no stage, the sails reaching almost to ground level. The mill is winded by tailpole and winch. The smock and cap are thatched. The sails are Common sails. They have a span of 16.30 metres (53 ft 6 in). The sails are carried on a cast iron windshaft, which was cast by IJzergieterij H. J. Koning of Foxham, Groningen in 1910. It also carries the brake wheel which has 48 cogs. This drives the wallower (31 cogs) at the top of the upright shaft. At the bottom of the upright shaft there are two crown wheels The upper crown wheel, which has 34 cogs, drives an Archimedes' screw. The lower crown wheel, which has 33 cogs is carried on the axle of an Archimedes' screw, which is used to drain the polder. The axle of the screw is 50 centimetres (1 ft 8 in) diameter and 1.25 metres (4 ft 1 in) long. The screw is 1.25 metres (4 ft 1 in) diameter. It is inclined at 30°. Each revolution of the screw lifts 506 litres (111 imp gal) of water.

== Public access ==
't Zwaantje is open to the public by appointment or whenever it is working.
