= Sloten, Friesland =

Sloten Sleat
- City
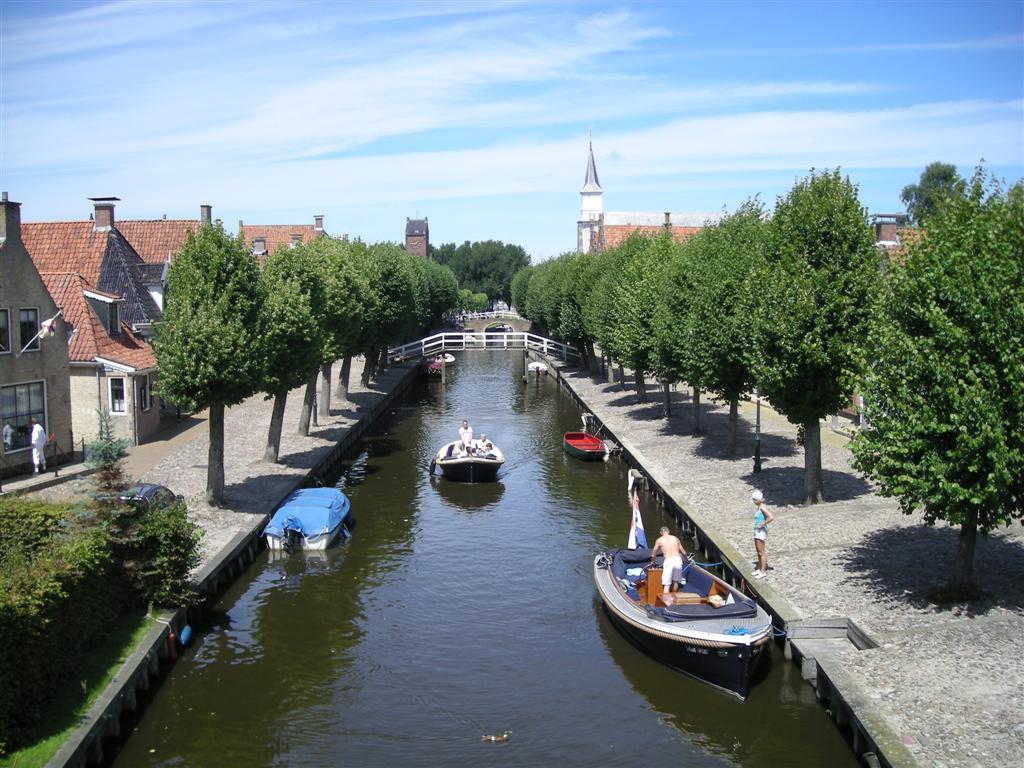

- Flag Coat of arms

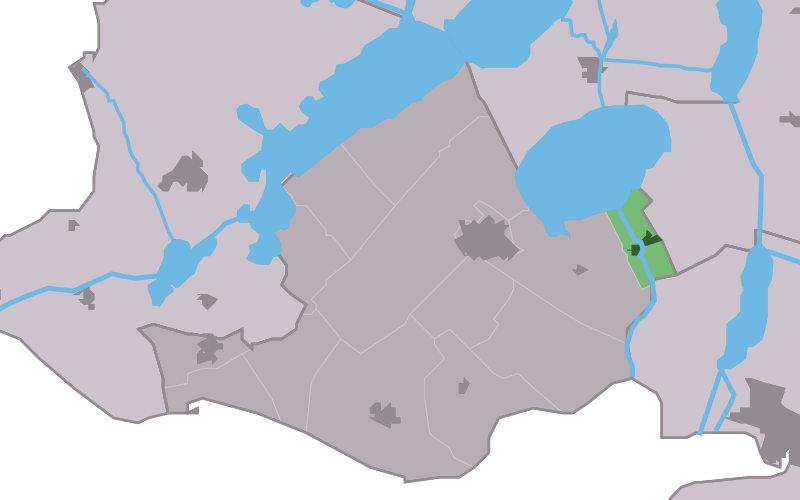
- Location in the former Gaasterlân-Sleat municipality

- Location in the Netherlands
- Country: Netherlands
- Province: Friesland
- Municipality: De Fryske Marren

Population (2017)
  - Total: 715
- Time zone: UTC+1 (CET)
  - Summer (DST): UTC+2 (CEST)
- Postal code: 8556
- Telephone area: 0514

Sloten (Dutch pronunciation: [ˈsloːtə(n)]; West Frisian: Sleat) is a historical fortified city within the municipality of De Fryske Marren, in the Dutch province of Friesland. Sloten lies adjacent to the Slotermeer and is situated between the towns of Lemmer and Balk.

Sloten is one of the eleven Frisian cities and was an independent municipality until 1984. Sloten then belonged to the municipality of Gaasterlân-Sleat until 1 January 2014. In 2017, Sloten had 715 inhabitants.

== History ==
Sloten originated in the thirteenth century as a settlement at a stins of the Van Harinxma thoe Slooten family. At the time, this noble family had many conflicts with the Vetkopers. Nothing remains of the stins today. Sloten is first mentioned having city rights in a charter dated to 30 August 1426. In 1523, the city was the last Frisian fortress to fall into the hands of the heirs of the counts of Holland. During the siege of Sloten in 1523, where Frisian and Gelderland troops were stationed, the Hollandic nobleman Jan II van Wassenaer was fatally wounded. This nobleman was the last Dutchman to die in the struggle for control of Friesland.

Sloten is located on the once important waterway from Sneek to the former Zuiderzee, overseeing access to the Hanseatic cities on the IJssel. In Sloten this waterway crossed with the road from Germany to Stavoren. It was therefore possible to levy tolls and exercise strategic control at this junction. The country road ran via Doniawerstal over the gaasts (sand ridges) via Sloten, where the waterway could be bridged, to Gaasterland and on to Stavoren, which in the Late Middle Ages had been a large and important trading town. Sloten also held a key position in the Eighty Years' War. A Spanish plot to conquer the city by hiding men in a beer ship failed. At the end of World War II, the Germans blew up the bridge over the Ee to slow down the progress of Canadian troops.

Since then, Sloten has lost its strategic importance. The city is popular with surface water sports enthusiasts and day-trippers. In the 1970s, a marina was built on the south side of the city where a number of water sports companies are located. There is also a sizable factory in the city that is part of the Nutreco group. The company produces milk substitutes for young cattle, such as calves and piglets. There is a lot of animal husbandry in the area of Sloten, which forms an important basis for the local economy.

The city has almost completely retained its original defensive enclosure of rampart and moat, and the original structure of Sloten has been preserved almost entirely. The fortress was designed and built by the famous fortress builder Menno van Coehoorn, who is buried in nearby Wijckel. Sloten was the ideal city in fortress terms; its shape is reminiscent of an onion, earning it the moniker of sipelstêd (onion city). The Sipelsneon (onion Saturday) is a local fair held every last Saturday of June.

Sloten had approximately 760 inhabitants in 2012 and is therefore not the smallest city in the Netherlands, as is often presumed. Sloten is the smallest city in Friesland, however.

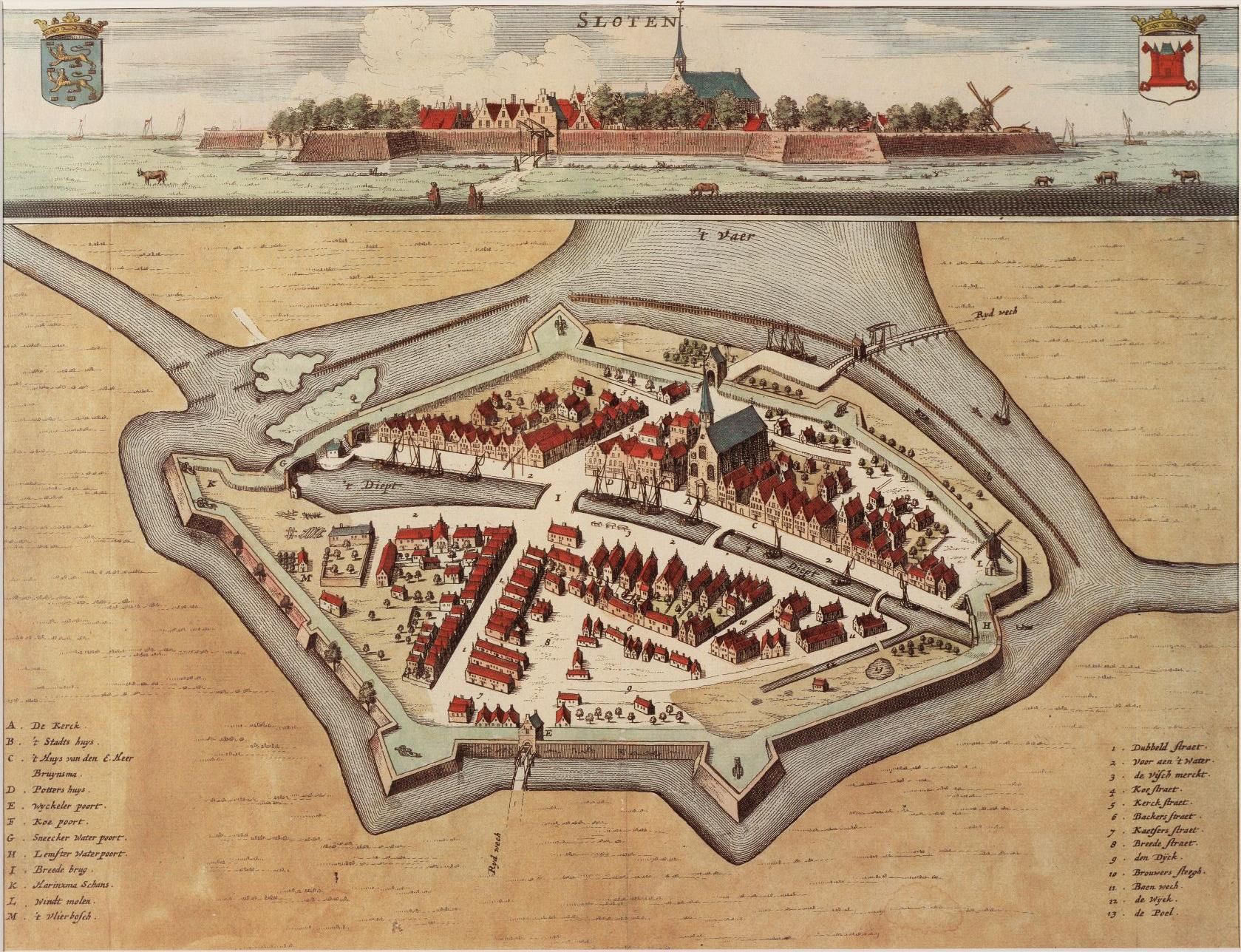
Cityscape of Sloten, 1664

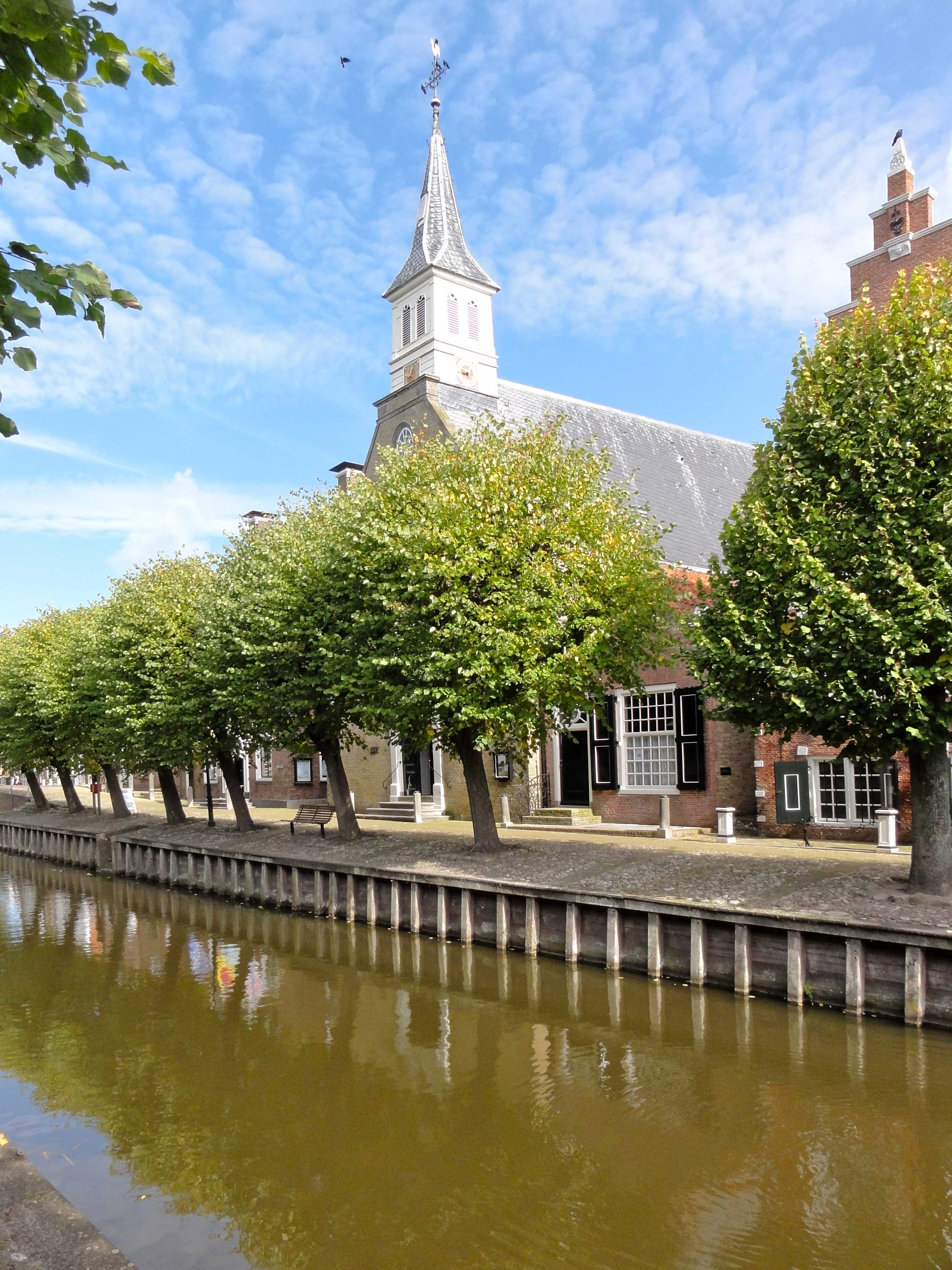
Reformed church

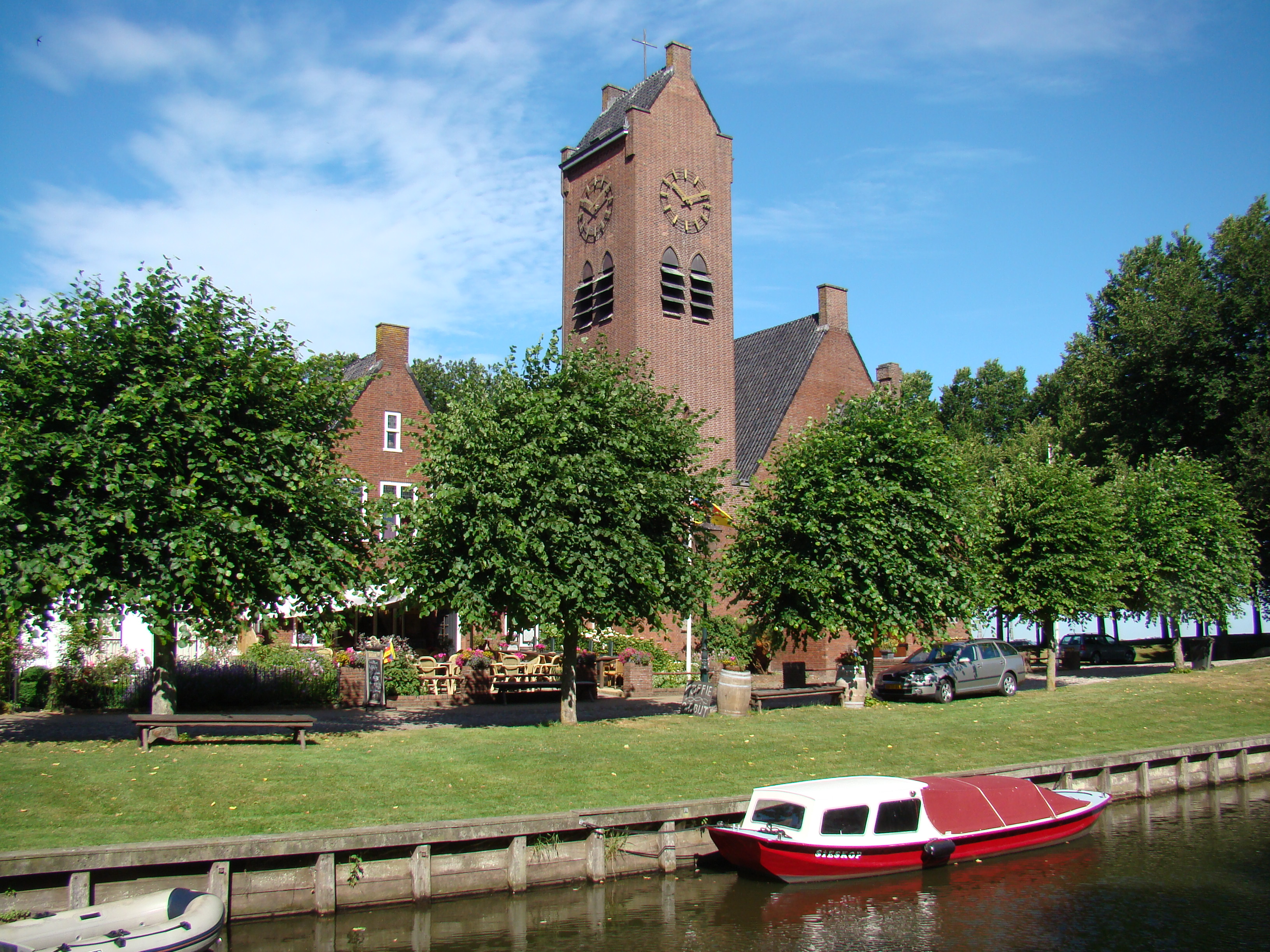
Saint Frederick church

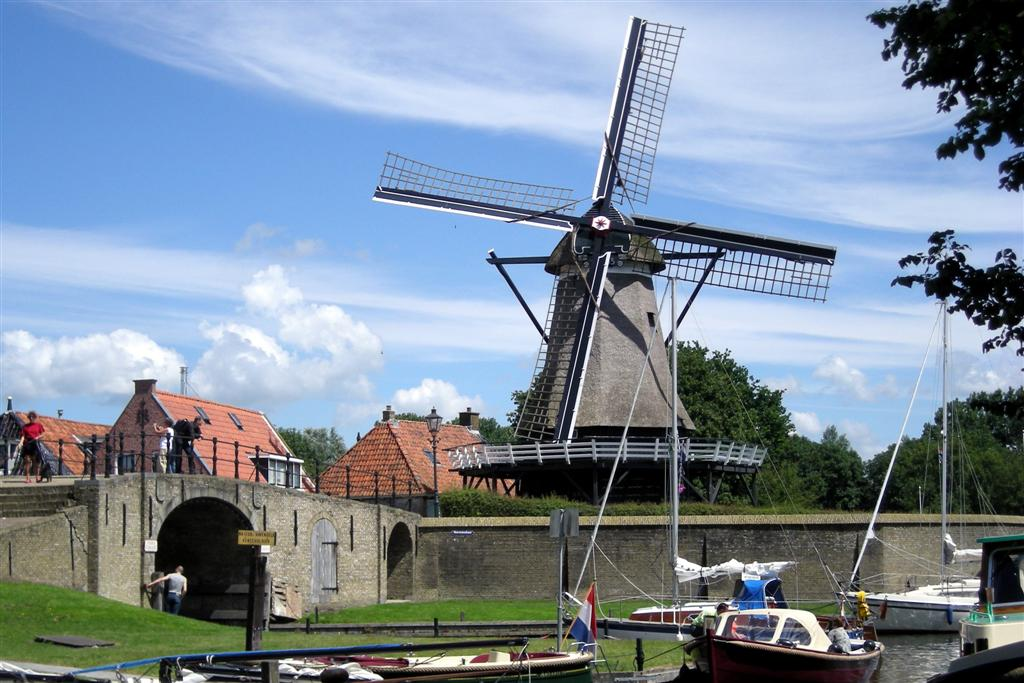
De Kaai windmill and the monumental bridge

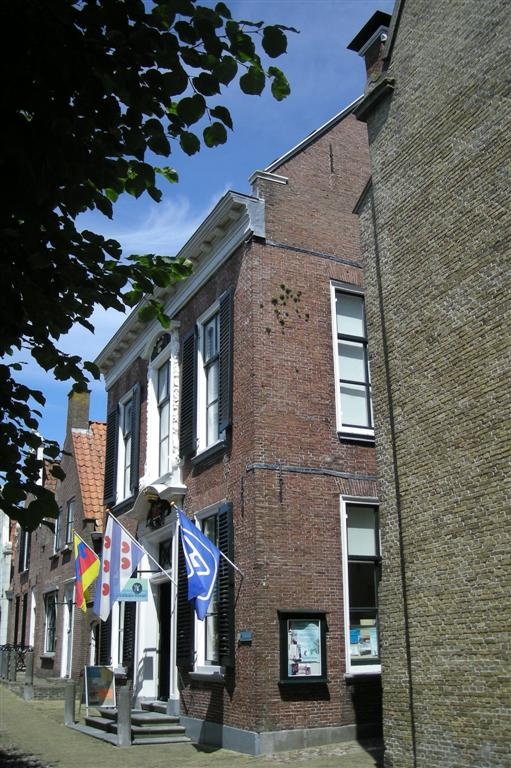
City hall museum

== Notable people ==
- Johan Petrus van Hylckama (1749–1816), politician
- Epeus Anne Reinoud Lichtenvoort Cats (1848–1897), politician
- Piet Klaasse (1918–2001), graphic designer and artist
- Willem Frans de Vreeze (born 1937), politician
- Sisca Folkertsma (born 1997), football player
