= Rijs =

Rijs Riis
- Village
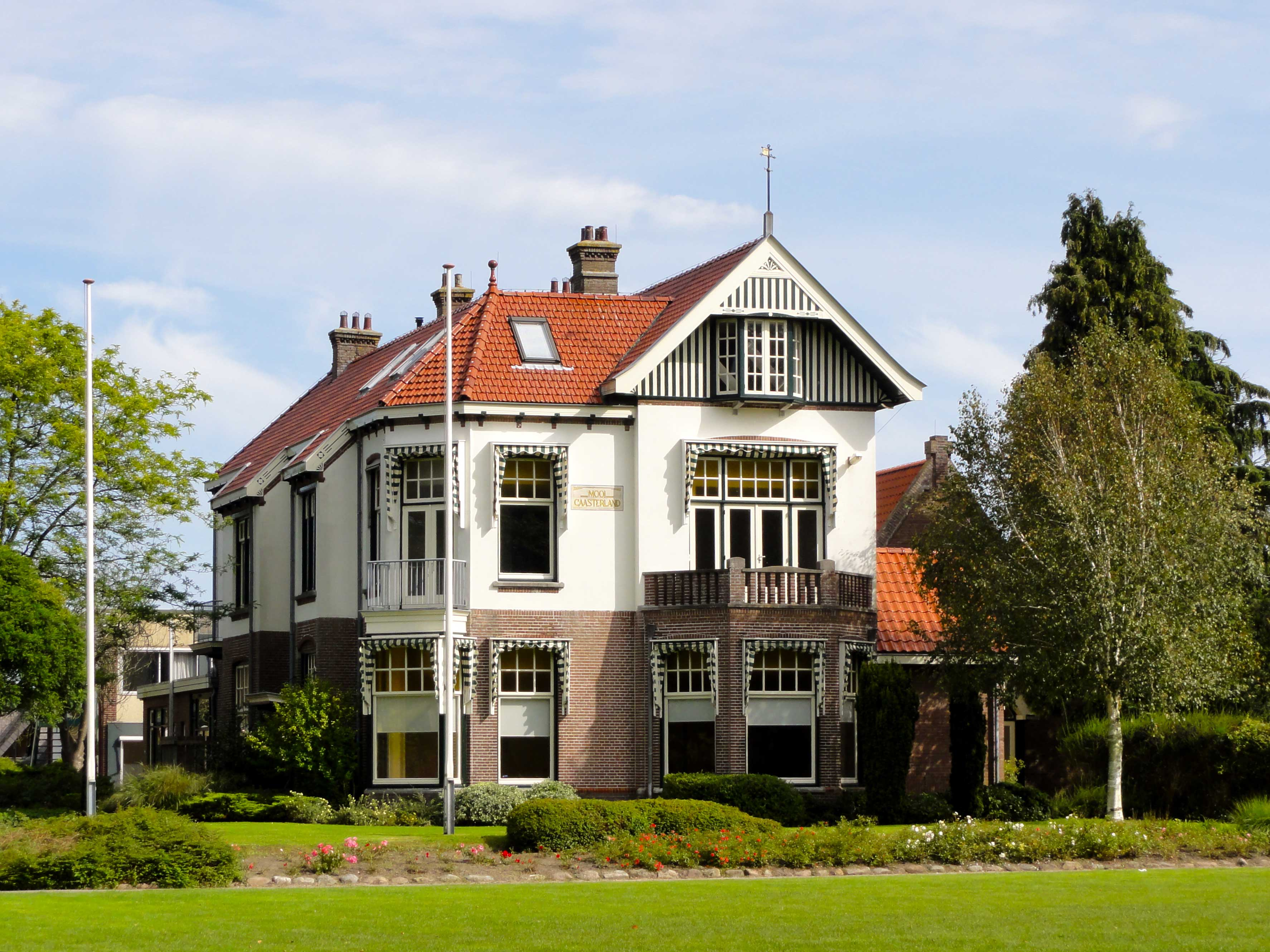
- Mooi Gaasterland mansion

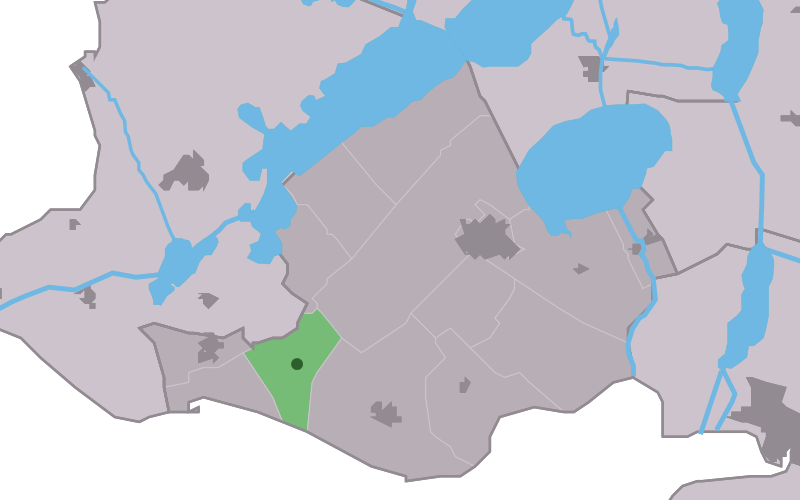
- Location in the former Gaasterlân-Sleat municipality

- Location in the Netherlands Rijs (Netherlands)
- Country: Netherlands
- Province: Friesland
- Municipality: De Fryske Marren

Area
  - Total: 5.42 km^{2} (2.09 sq mi)
- Elevation: 1 m (3.3 ft)

Population (2021)
  - Total: 175
  - Density: 32.3/km^{2} (83.6/sq mi)
- Time zone: UTC+1 (CET)
  - Summer (DST): UTC+2 (CEST)
- Postal code: 8572
- Dialing code: 0514

Rijs (West Frisian: Riis) is a village within the municipality of De Fryske Marren in the province of Friesland, the Netherlands.

Rijs is situated on the road between Oudemirdum and Hemelum. It has approximately 170 citizens (2017). Rijs is best known for its 300-year-old planted forest, known as Rijsterbos.

== History ==
The village was first mentioned in 1333 as Riis and means branches. It is related to a grange of the Abbey of Staveren which was demolished in 1495 by Ygo Gales Galama, a Frisian warlord. Rijs was located on a sandy ridge.

Huis Rijs was a stins (manor house) built in the 17th century. As part of the estate, a large forest was planted. The building was demolished in 1937, and replaced by a modern house. The forest is owned by It Fryske Gea and is publicly accessible.

In 1840, Rijs was home to 95 people. In 1916, the former brickworks of Rijs was used as a refugee camp for several hundred Belgian refugees.

Before 2014, Rijs was part of the Gaasterlân-Sleat municipality and before 1984 it was part of Gaasterland.

== Gallery ==
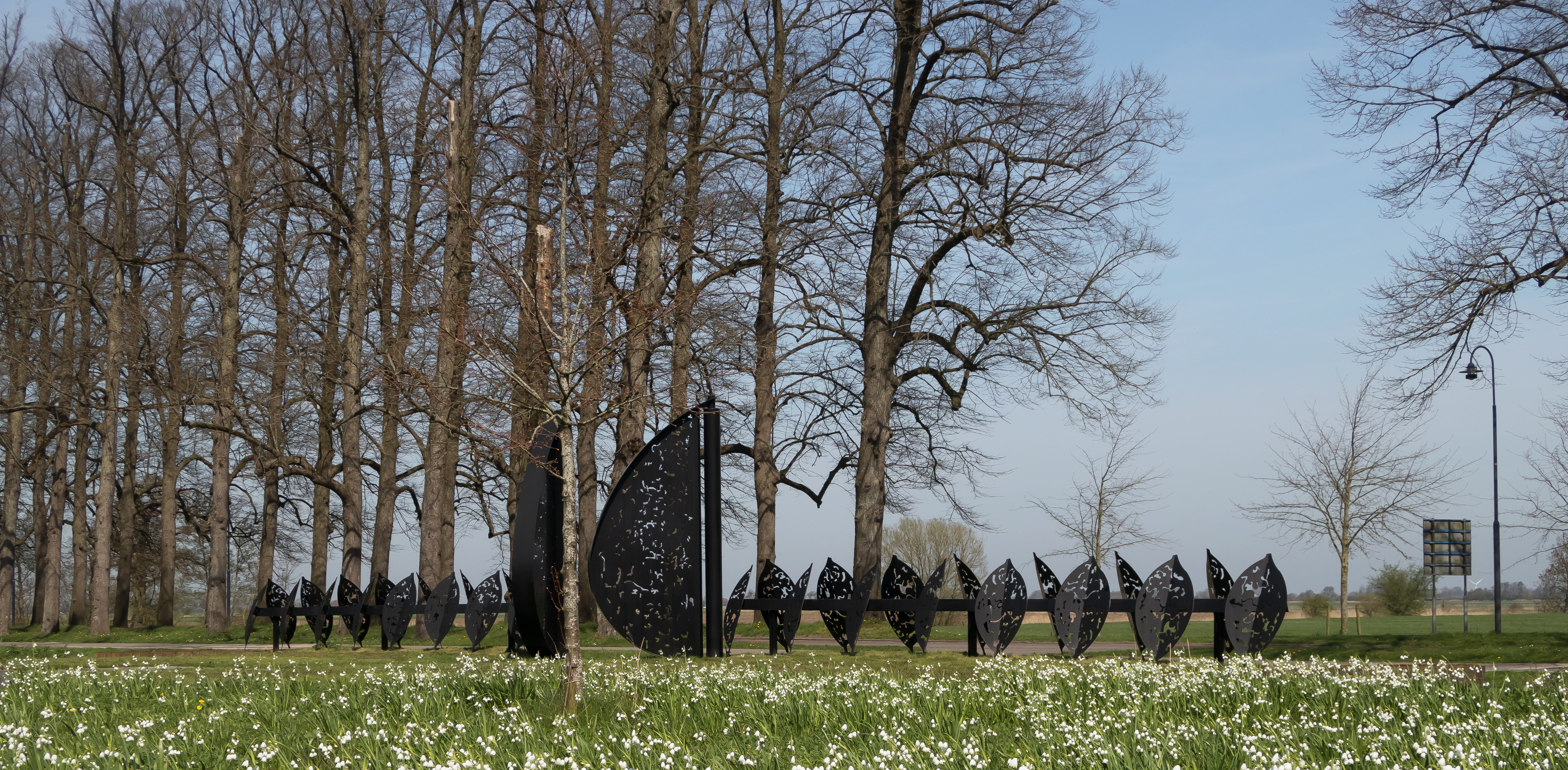
The garden entrance gate of Huis Rijs

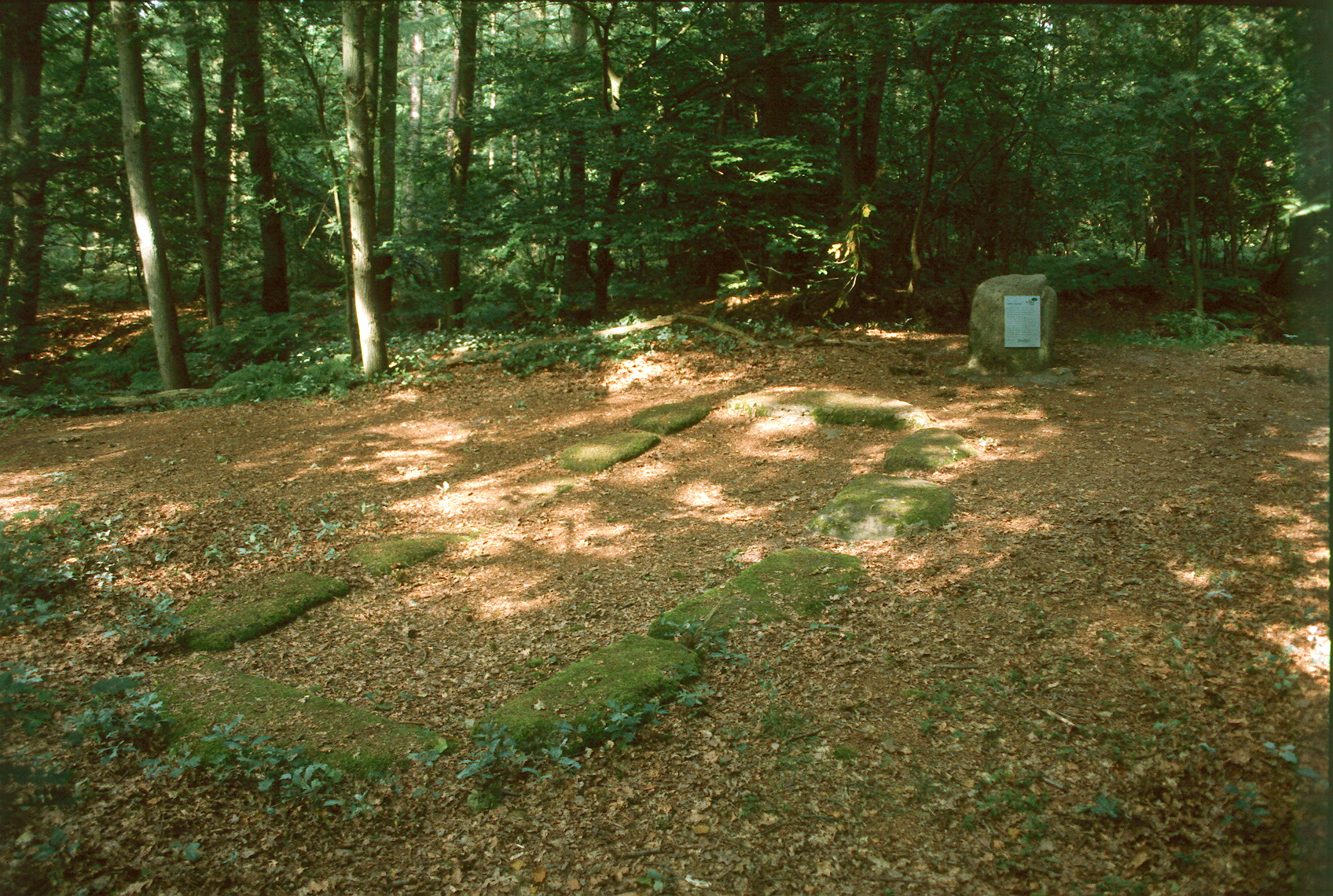
Dolmen in the forest

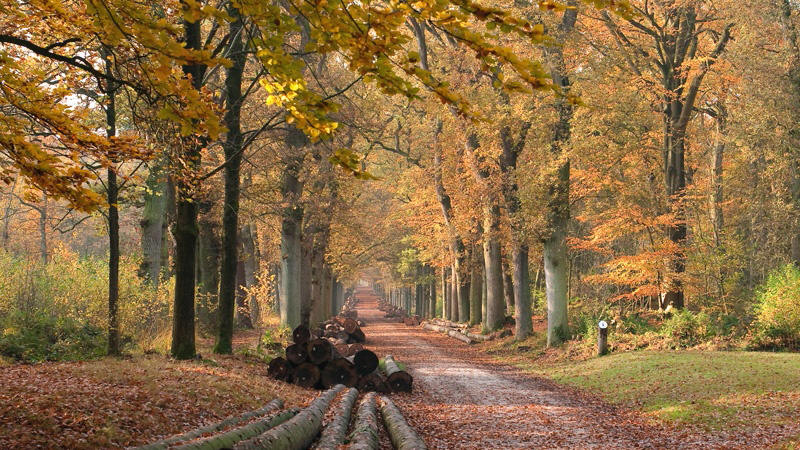
Rijsterbos

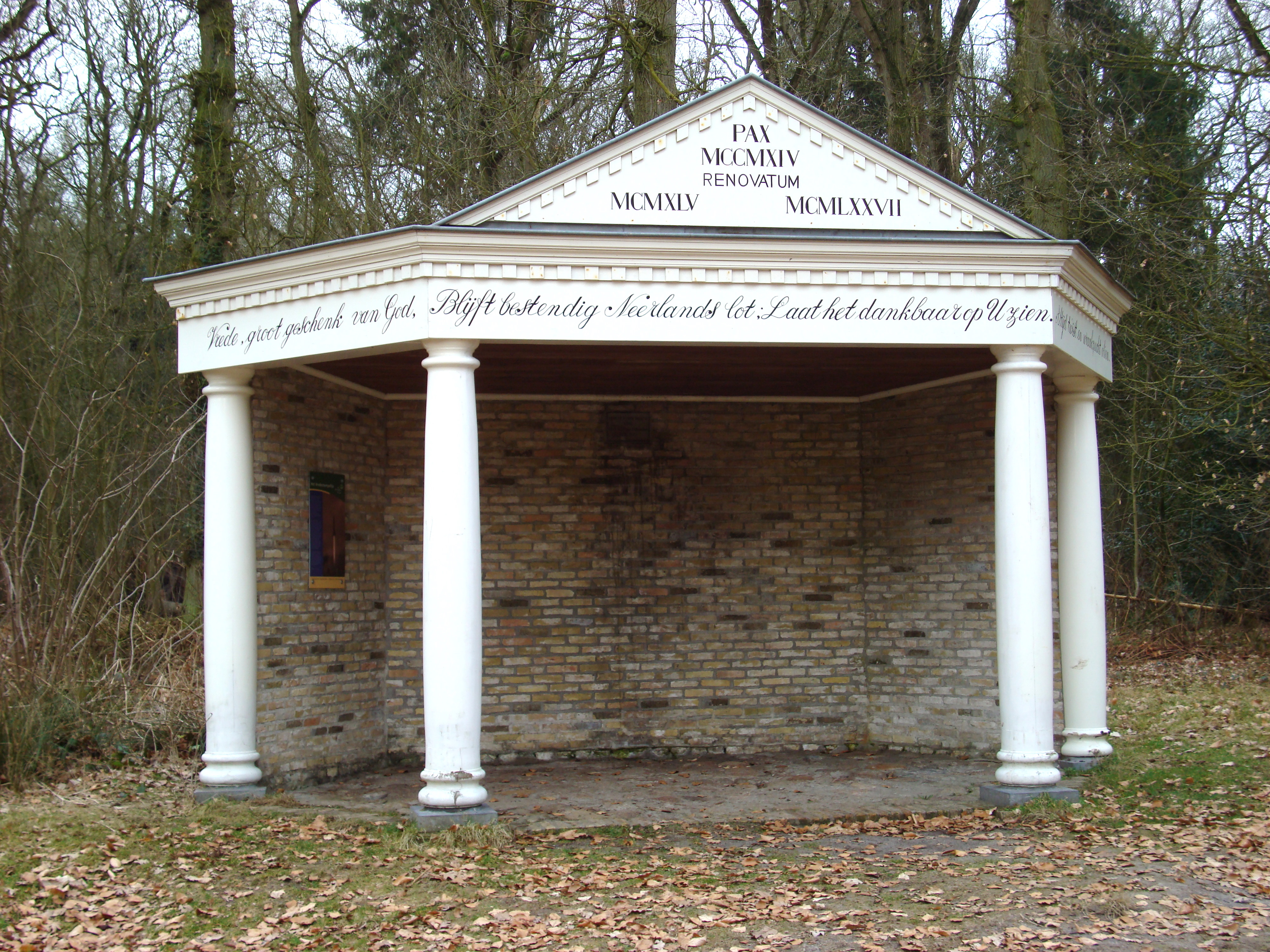
Peace temple
