= Bakhuizen =

Bakhuizen Bakhuzen
- Village
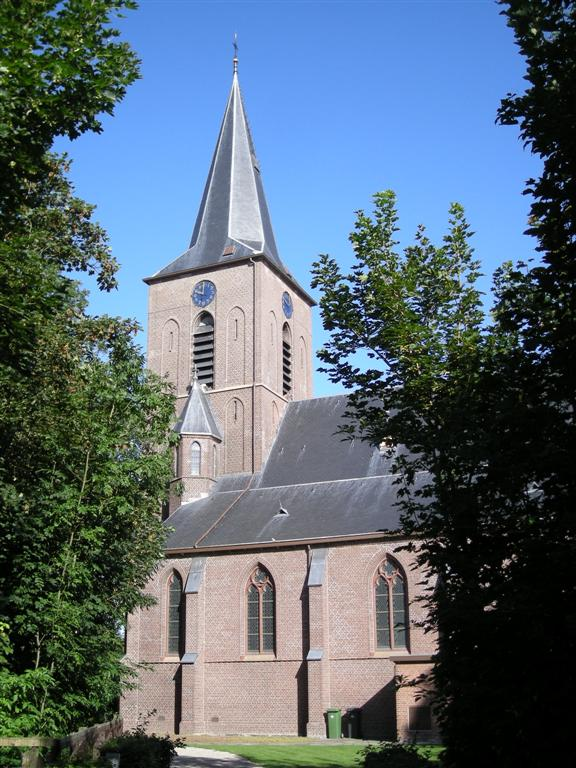
- Bakhuizen Church

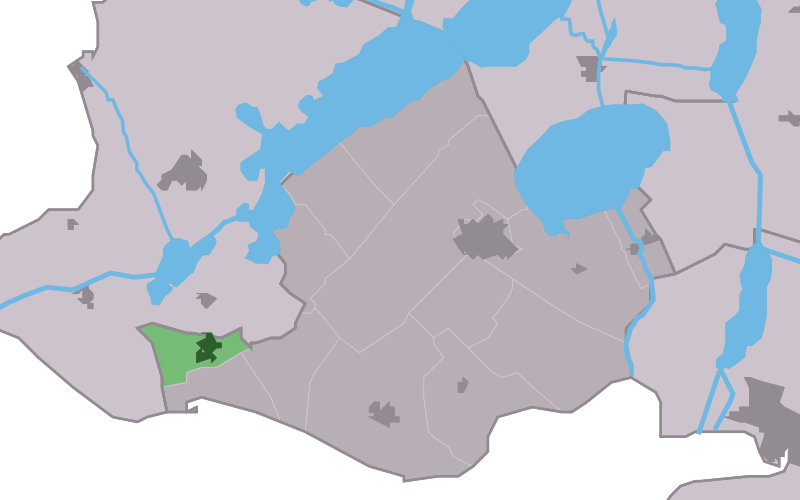
- Location in De Friese Meren municipality

- Location in the Netherlands Bakhuizen (Netherlands)
- Country: Netherlands
- Province: Friesland
- Municipality: De Fryske Marren

Area
  - Total: 2.91 km^{2} (1.12 sq mi)
- Elevation: 7 m (23 ft)

Population (2021)
  - Total: 1,045
  - Density: 359/km^{2} (930/sq mi)
- Time zone: UTC+1 (CET)
  - Summer (DST): UTC+2 (CEST)
- Postal code: 8574
- Dialing code: 0514
- Website: Official

Bakhuizen (West Frisian: Bakhuzen) is a village in the Dutch province of Friesland. It is in the municipality De Fryske Marren, about 6 km east of the city of Stavoren.

Bakhuizen has about 1,075 inhabitants.

== History ==
The village was first mentioned in 1412 as Backhuysen. The etymology is unclear. Bakhuizen developed in the 12th or 13th century on a clay ridge. Even though it belonged to Mirns, it developed independently and became a Catholic enclave. The first church was built in 1412. After the Reformation, the villagers used a clandestine church in Elfbergen and the wind mill Mole Polle. The Catholic St.-Odulphus Church was built between 1913 and 1914. In 1840, it was home to 477 people.
