= Mirns =

Mirns Murns
- Village
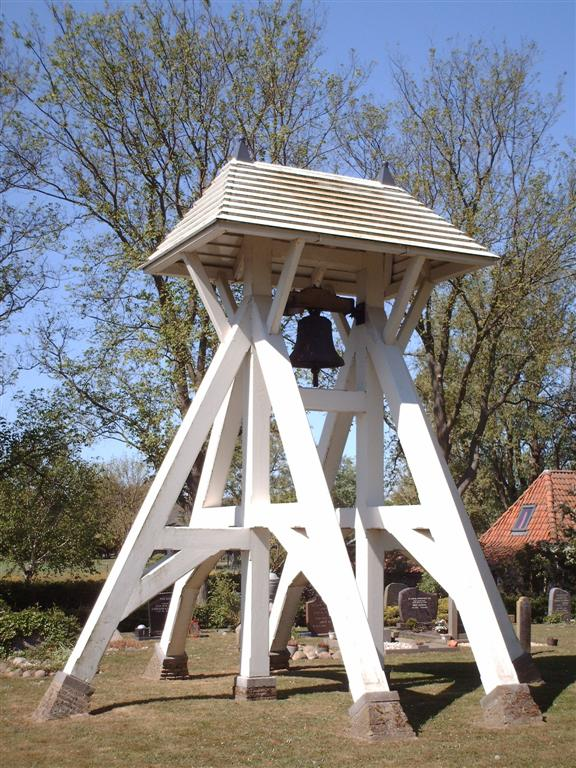
- Mirns bell tower

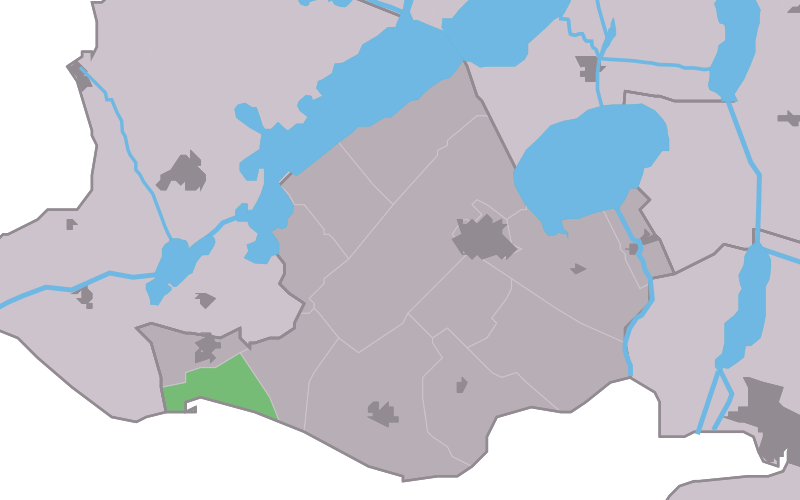
- Location in the former Gaasterlân Sleat municipality

- Location in the Netherlands Mirns (Netherlands)
- Country: Netherlands
- Province: Friesland
- Municipality: De Fryske Marren

Area
  - Total: 3.72 km^{2} (1.44 sq mi)
- Elevation: 3 m (9.8 ft)

Population (2021)
  - Total: 105
  - Density: 28.2/km^{2} (73.1/sq mi)
- Time zone: UTC+1 (CET)
  - Summer (DST): UTC+2 (CEST)
- Postal code: 8573
- Dialing code: 0514

Mirns (West Frisian: Murns) is a village in De Fryske Marren in the province of Friesland, the Netherlands. It had a population of around 130 in 2017.

== History ==
The village was first mentioned between 1243 and 1254 as Midlinghe, and means settlement in the middle. Mirns was a settlement on the former Zuiderzee coast (nowadays: IJsselmeer). The church was demolished in the mid-18th century.

The belfry was built in 1723. It was destroyed on 22 December 1943 when an American Consolidated B-24 Liberator was struck by a rocket and crashed into the tower. Seven of the crew members died in the crash, however Joe Gill survived. All except John Allen were reburied at the Netherlands American Cemetery after the war. The bell tower was later rebuilt in a wider shape. There is a little American wind mill from the 1920s on the coast.

Before 2009, Mirns was part of the Gaasterlân-Sleat municipality and before 1984 it was part of Gaasterland.

== Gallery ==
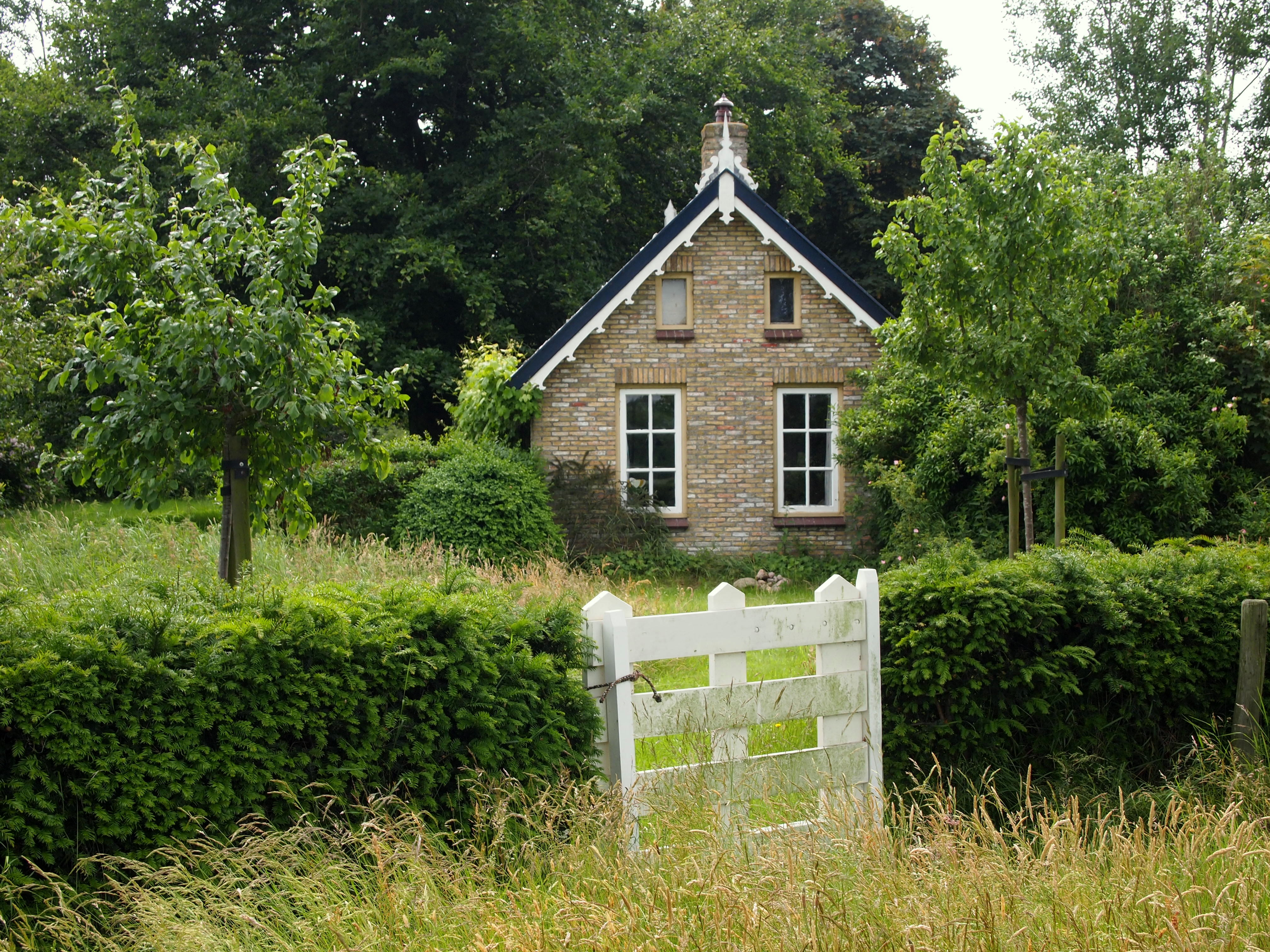
Little house

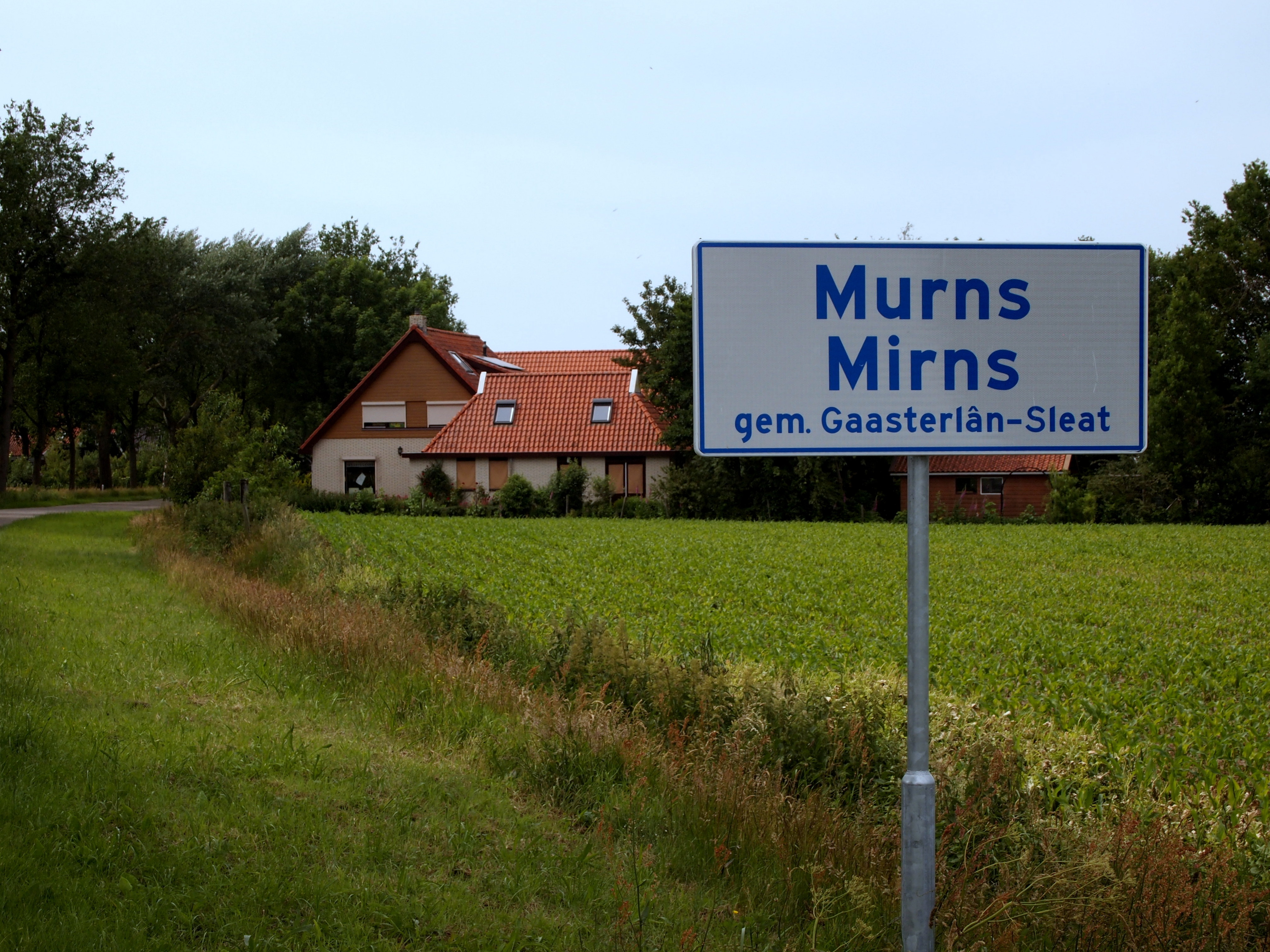
Welcome to Mirns

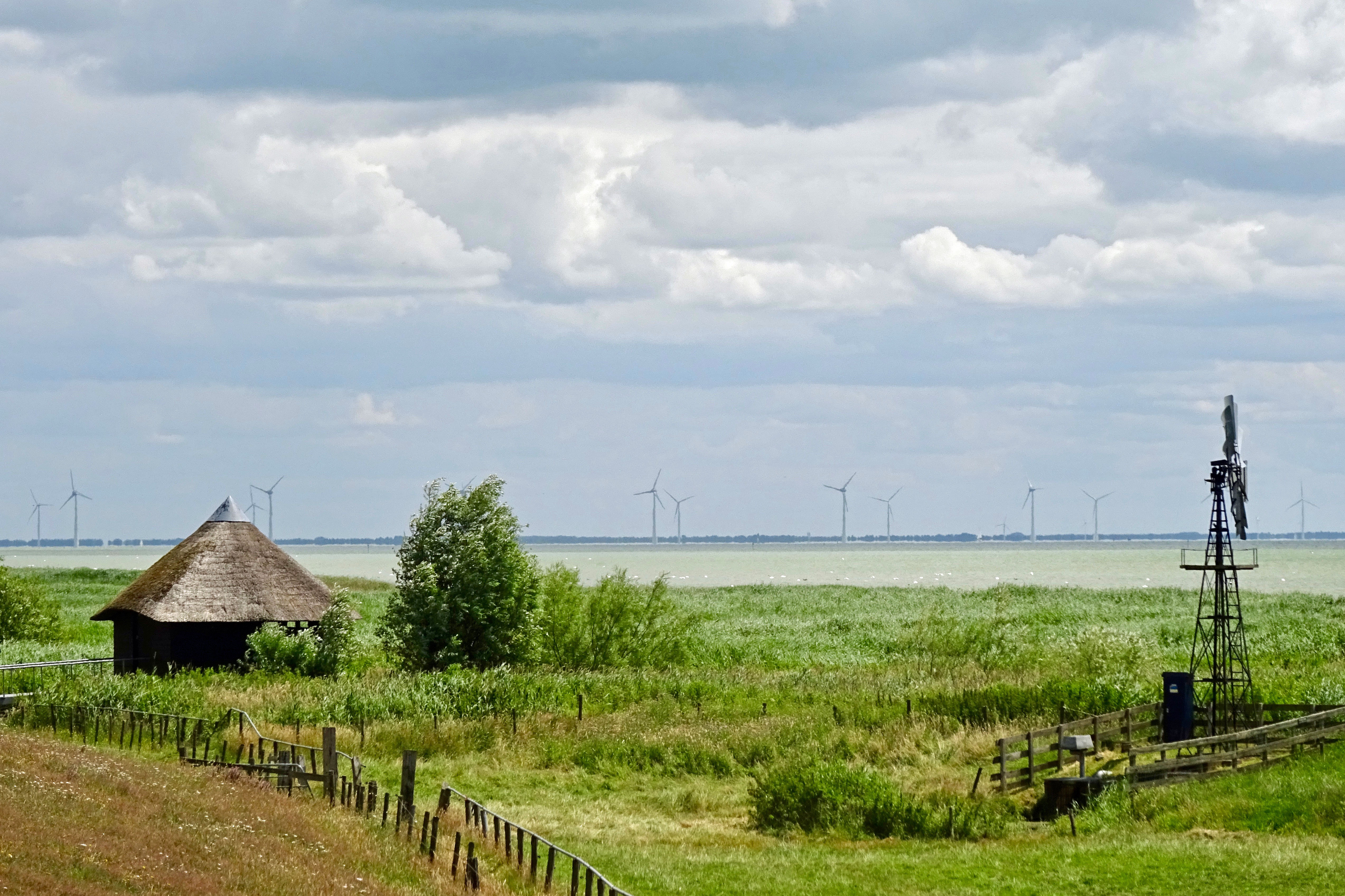
Bird watching shed

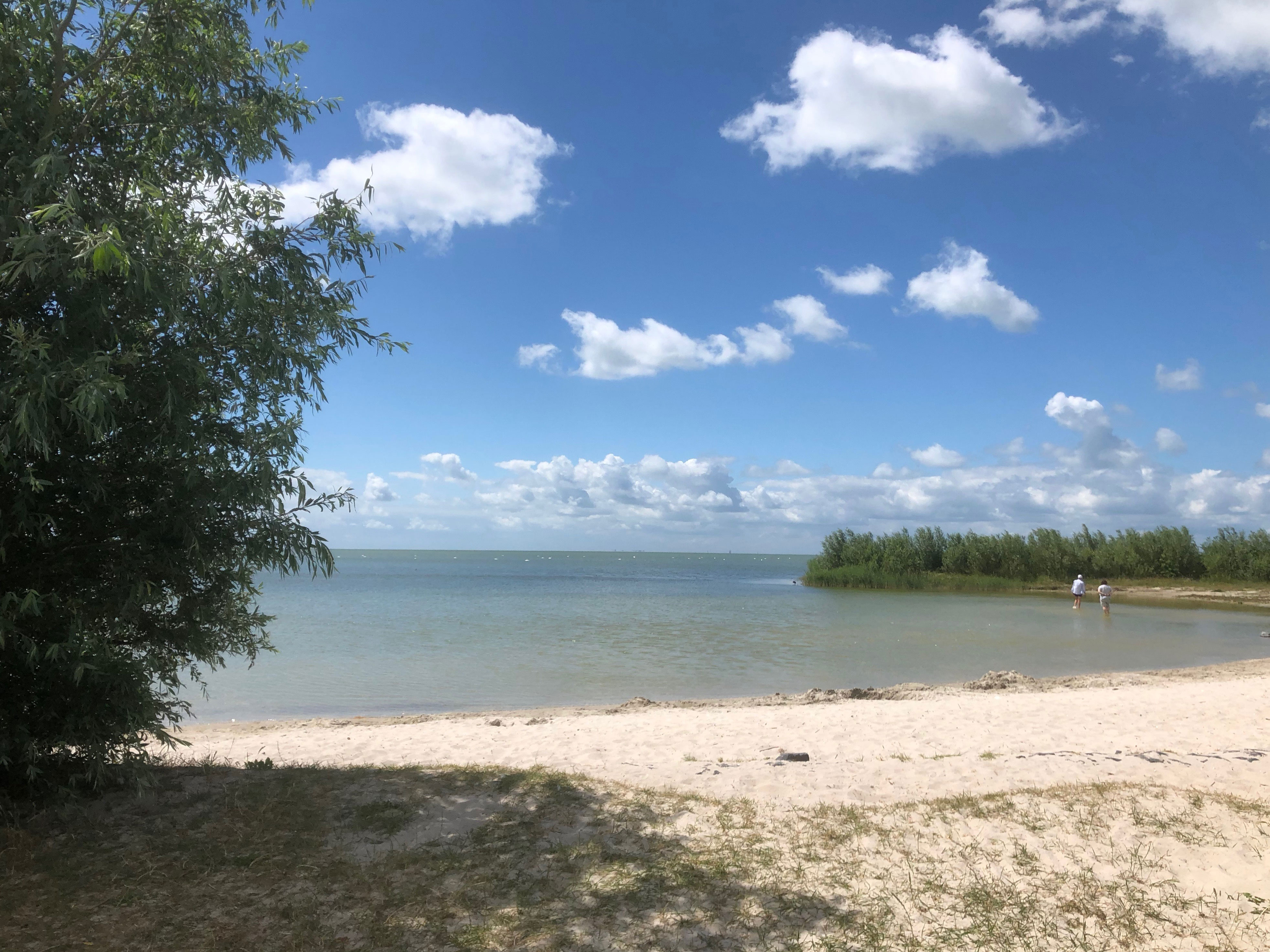
Beach of Mirns

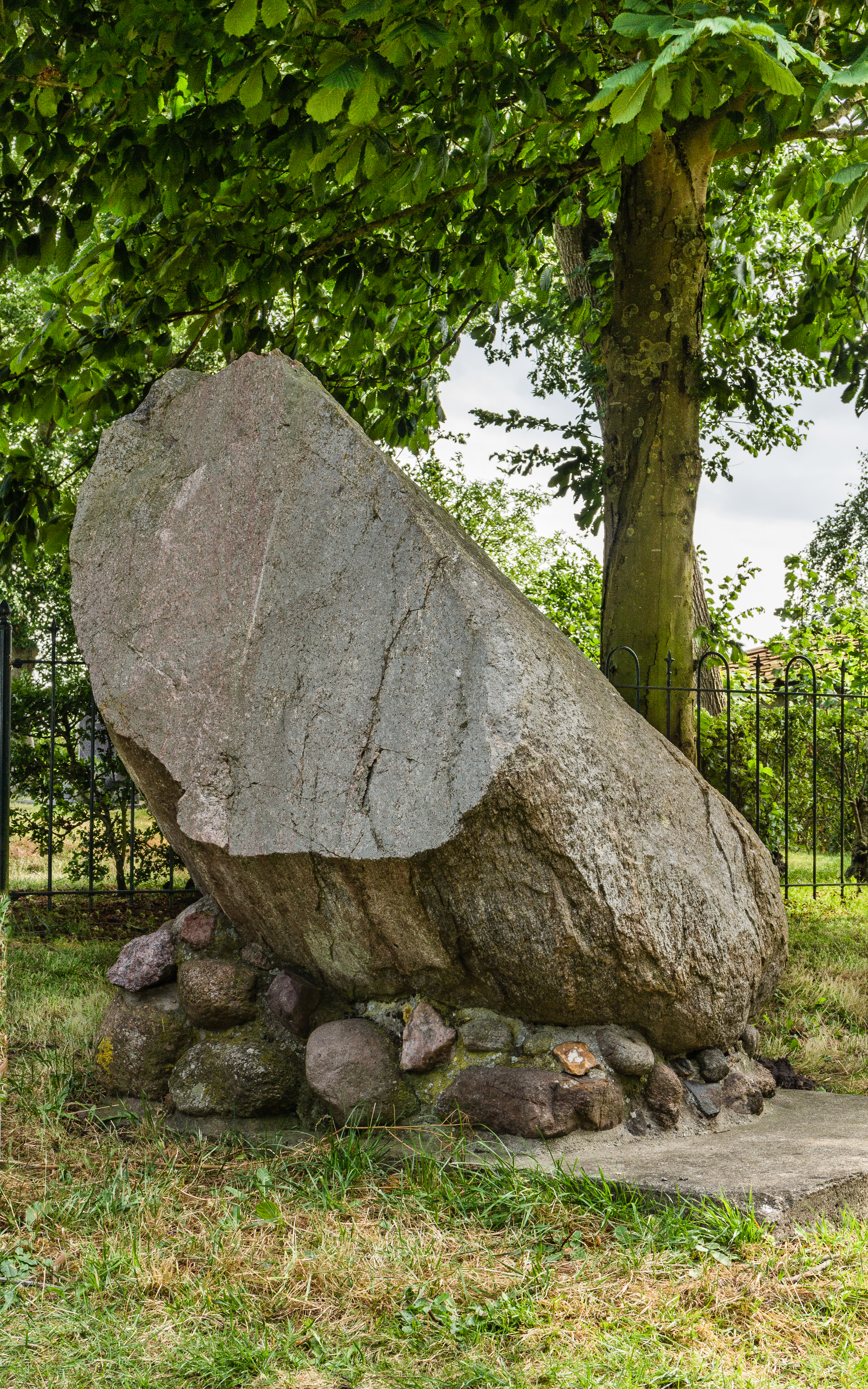
War Memorial

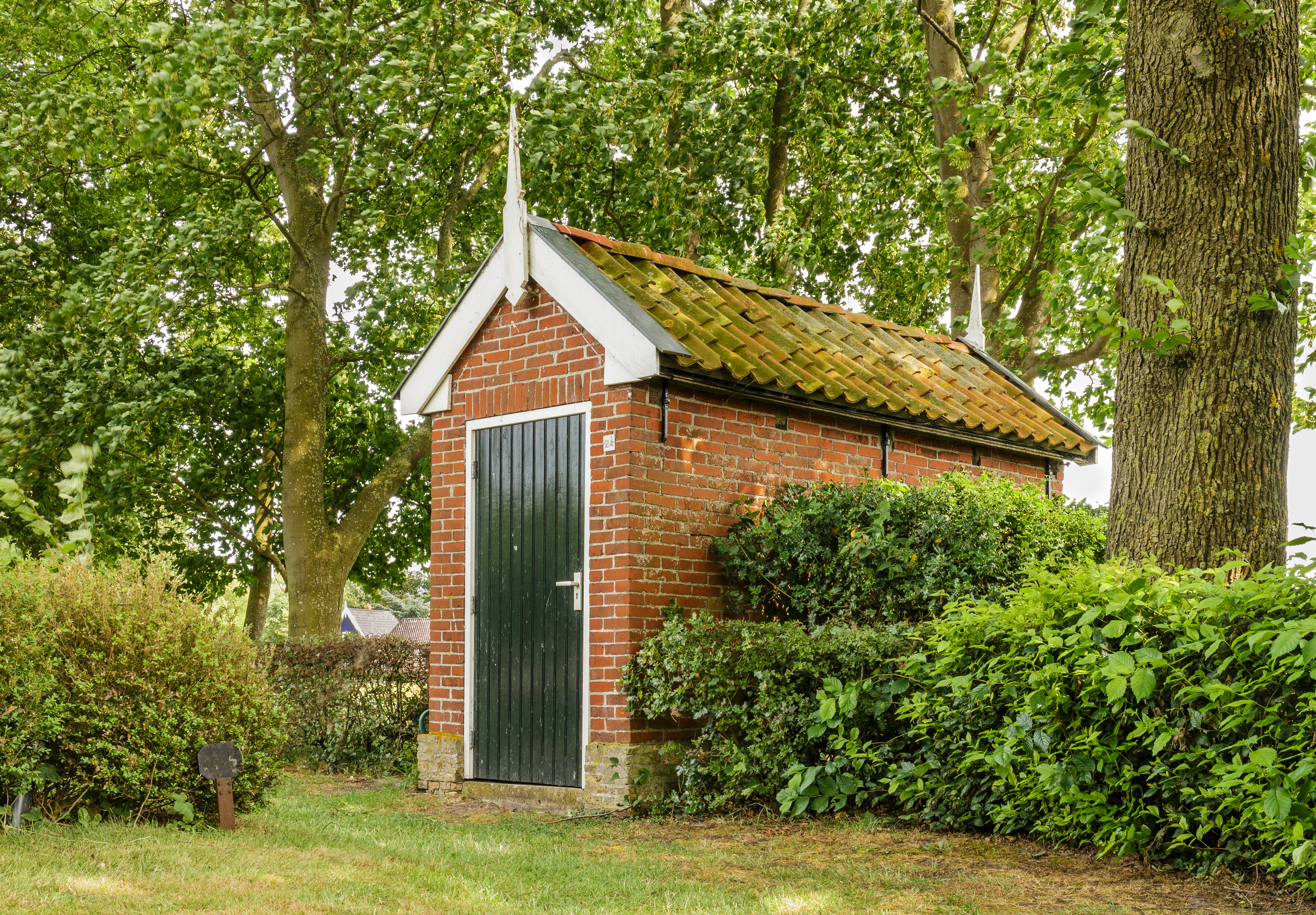
Graveyard Mirns. Ossuary.
