= Sondel =

- Village
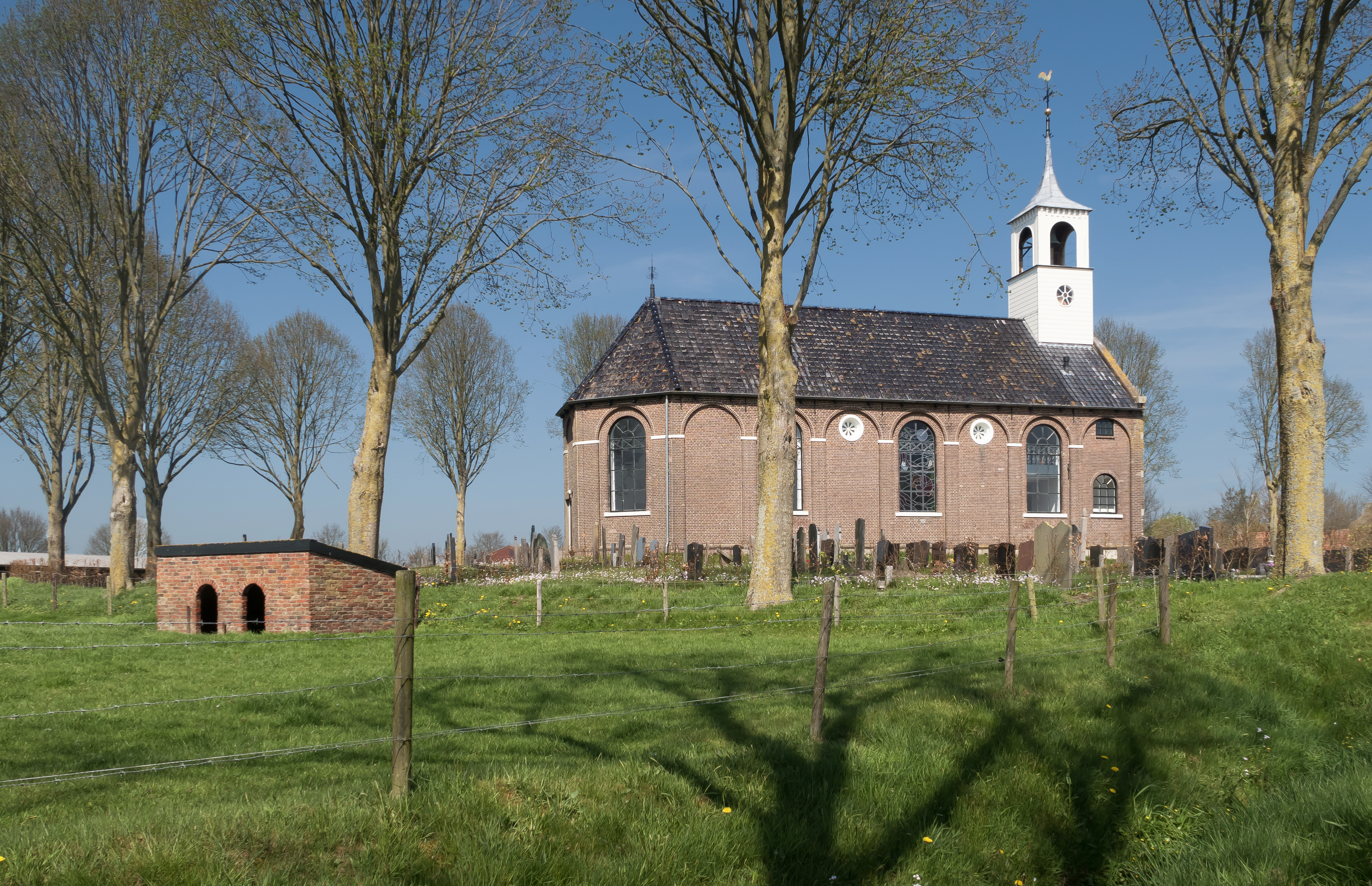
- reformed church in Sondel

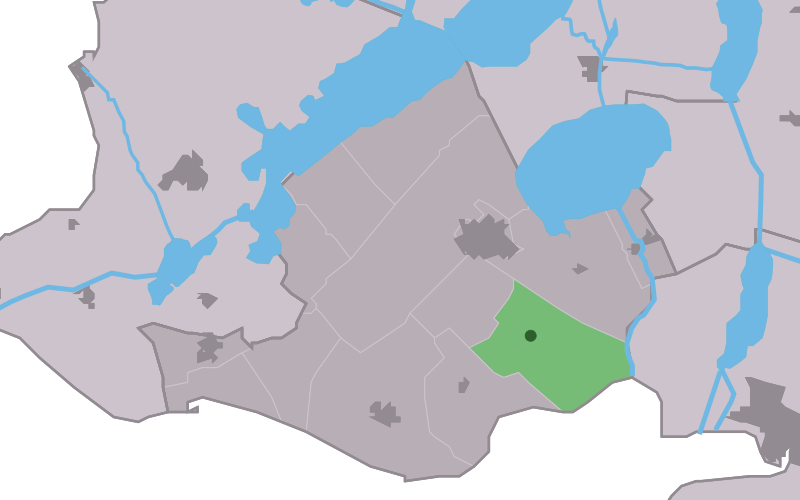
- Location in the former Gaasterlân-Sleat municipality

- Location in the Netherlands Sondel (Netherlands)
- Country: Netherlands
- Province: Friesland
- Municipality: De Fryske Marren

Area
  - Total: 9.63 km^{2} (3.72 sq mi)
- Elevation: 0.9 m (3.0 ft)

Population (2021)
  - Total: 400
  - Density: 42/km^{2} (110/sq mi)
- Time zone: UTC+1 (CET)
  - Summer (DST): UTC+2 (CEST)
- Postal code: 8565
- Dialing code: 0514

Sondel is a village in De Fryske Marren municipality in the province of Friesland, the Netherlands. It had a population of around 410 in 2017.

== History ==
The village was first mentioned in 1422 Syndele. The etymologie is not clear. Sondel developed on a sandy ridge during the 12th or 13th century, and had both a water and road connection to the Zuiderzee (nowadays: IJsselmeer). The Dutch Reformed Church was built in 1870 as a replacement of a medieval church and has a 14th-century bell. In 1840, Sondel was home to 239 people. In 1942, a radar installation was built near Sondel by the German occupiers, and consists of sixteen partially submerged barracks. Nowadays, it is in use as a recreational site.

Before 2014, Sondel was part of the Gaasterlân-Sleat municipality and before 1984 it was part of Gaasterland.

== Gallery ==
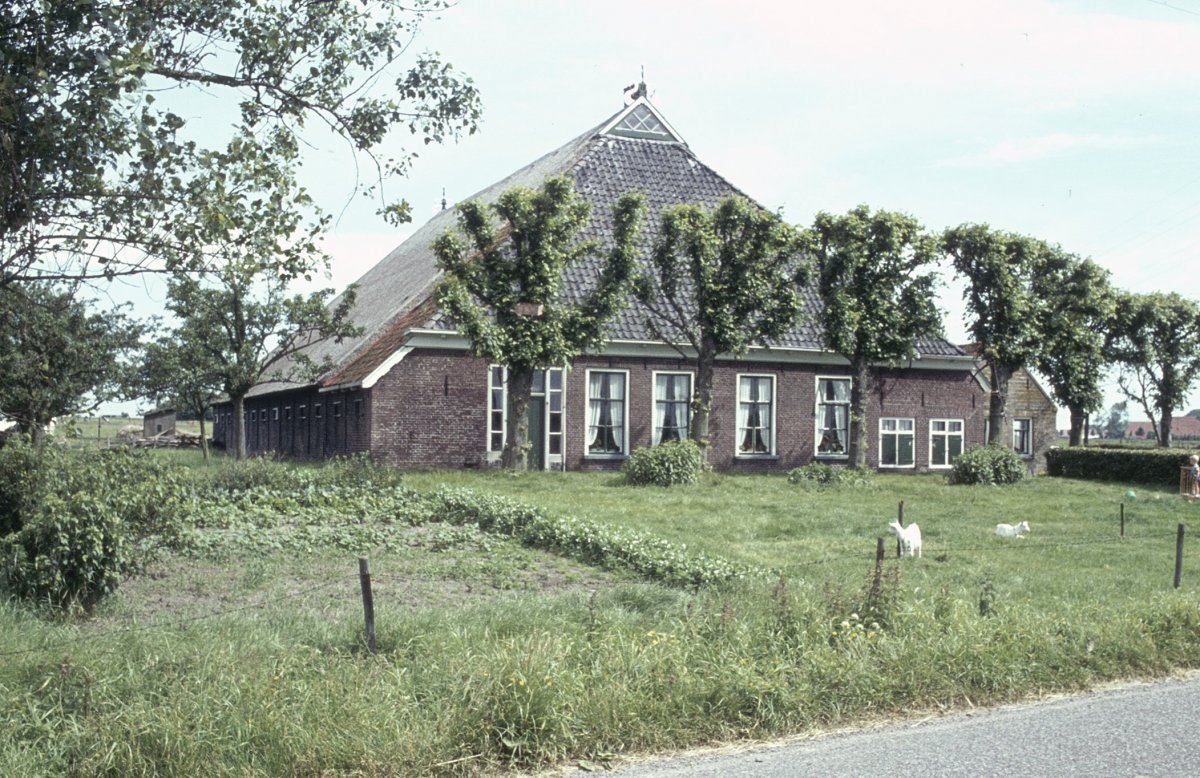
Farm in Sondel

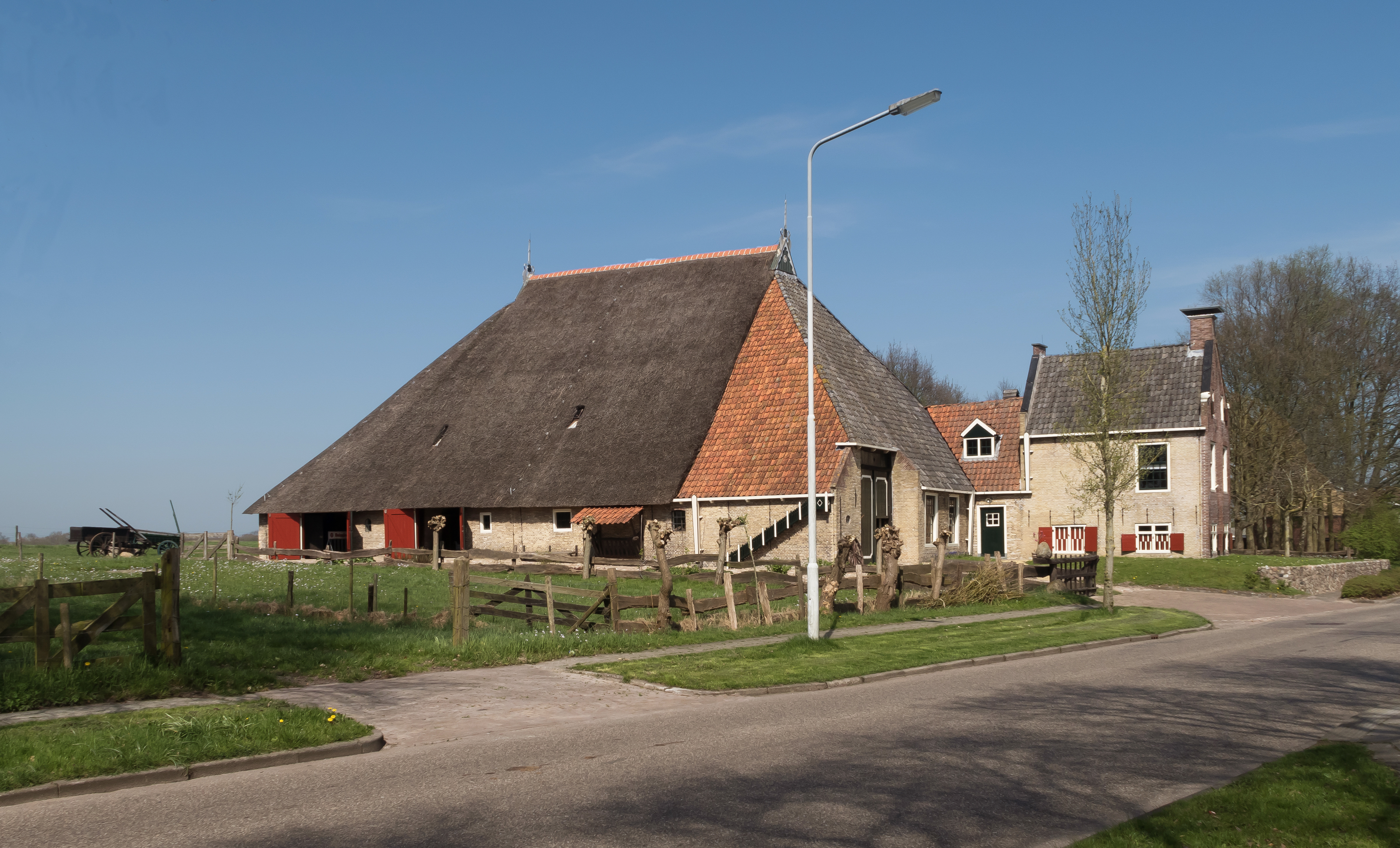
Farm in Sondel
