= Oudemirdum =

Oudemirdum Aldemardum
- Village
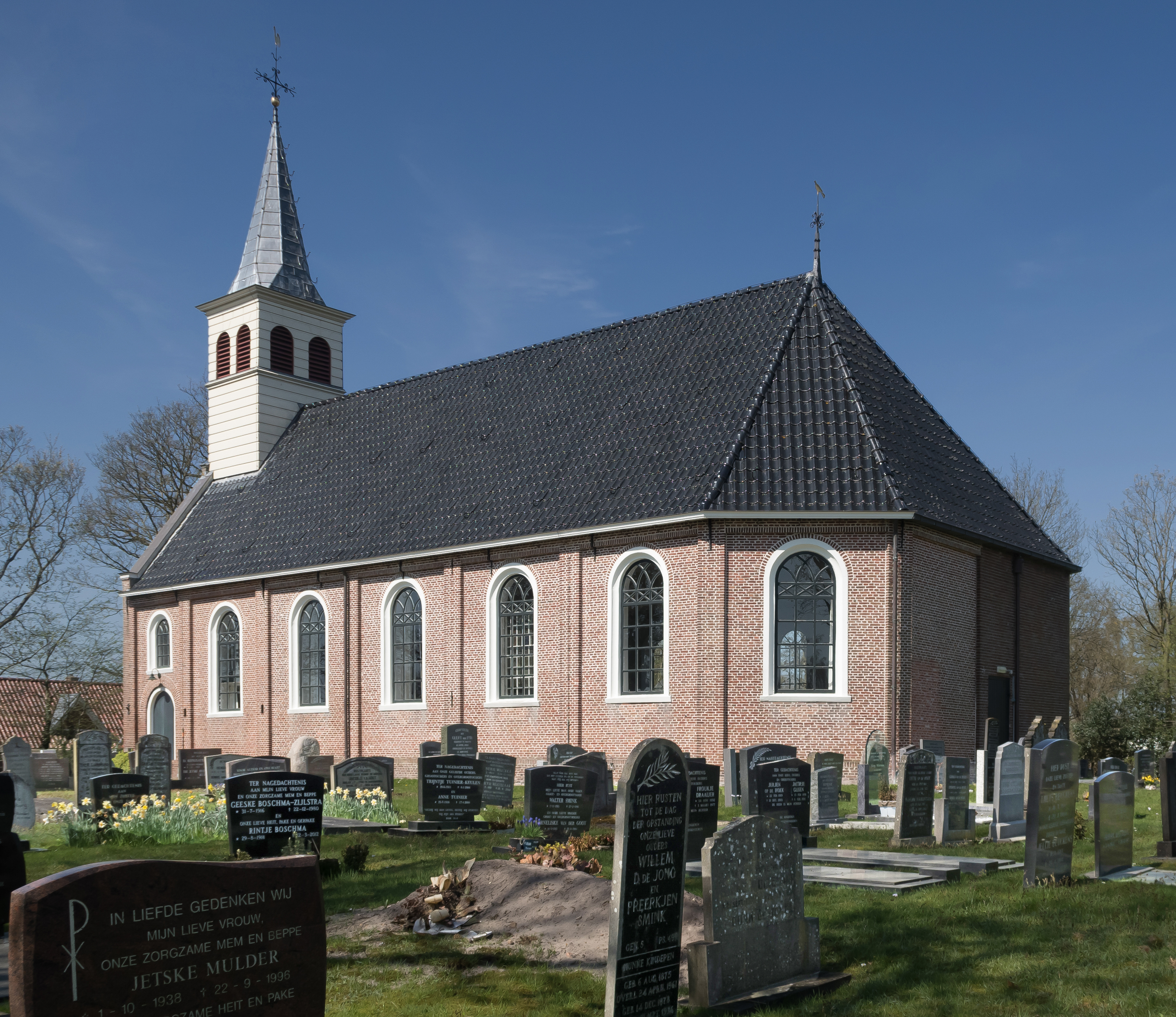
- Oudemirdum reformed church

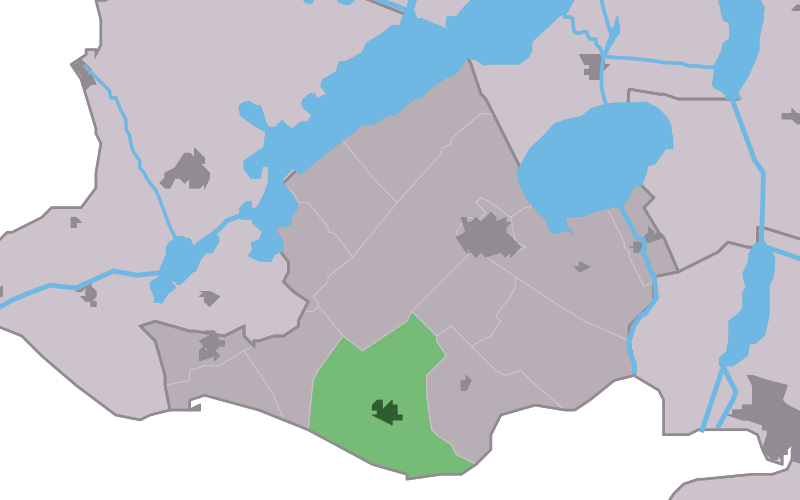
- Location in the former Gaasterlân Sleat municipality

- Location in the Netherlands Oudemirdum (Netherlands)
- Country: Netherlands
- Province: Friesland
- Municipality: De Fryske Marren

Population (2017)
  - Total: 1,330
- Time zone: UTC+1 (CET)
  - Summer (DST): UTC+2 (CEST)
- Postal code: 8567
- Telephone area: 0514
- Website: Official

Oudemirdum (West Frisian: Aldemardum) is a small village in De Fryske Marren municipality in the province Friesland of the Netherlands and has around the 1330 citizens (2017).

== History ==
The name Oudemirdumis first mentioned in 1329, but the first settlements were before 850. Previously changed the name of ‘Meretha’, in ‘Merthen’, ‘Maerdum’, ‘Merthum’ and ‘Mirdum’ into ‘Oudemirdum’. Through the old village with a brink does Oudemirdum few Drents on. That old village, from the late Middle Ages, consists De Brink, the church (a monument) en de Alde Buorren. In the 19th century The center was expanded with Jan Schotanuswei and the Tsjerkestrjitte, both with a few old farmhouses and houses on both sides of the road.

Before 2014, Oudemirdum was part of the Gaasterlân-Sleat municipality and before 1984 it was part of Gaasterland.

=== Riniastate ===
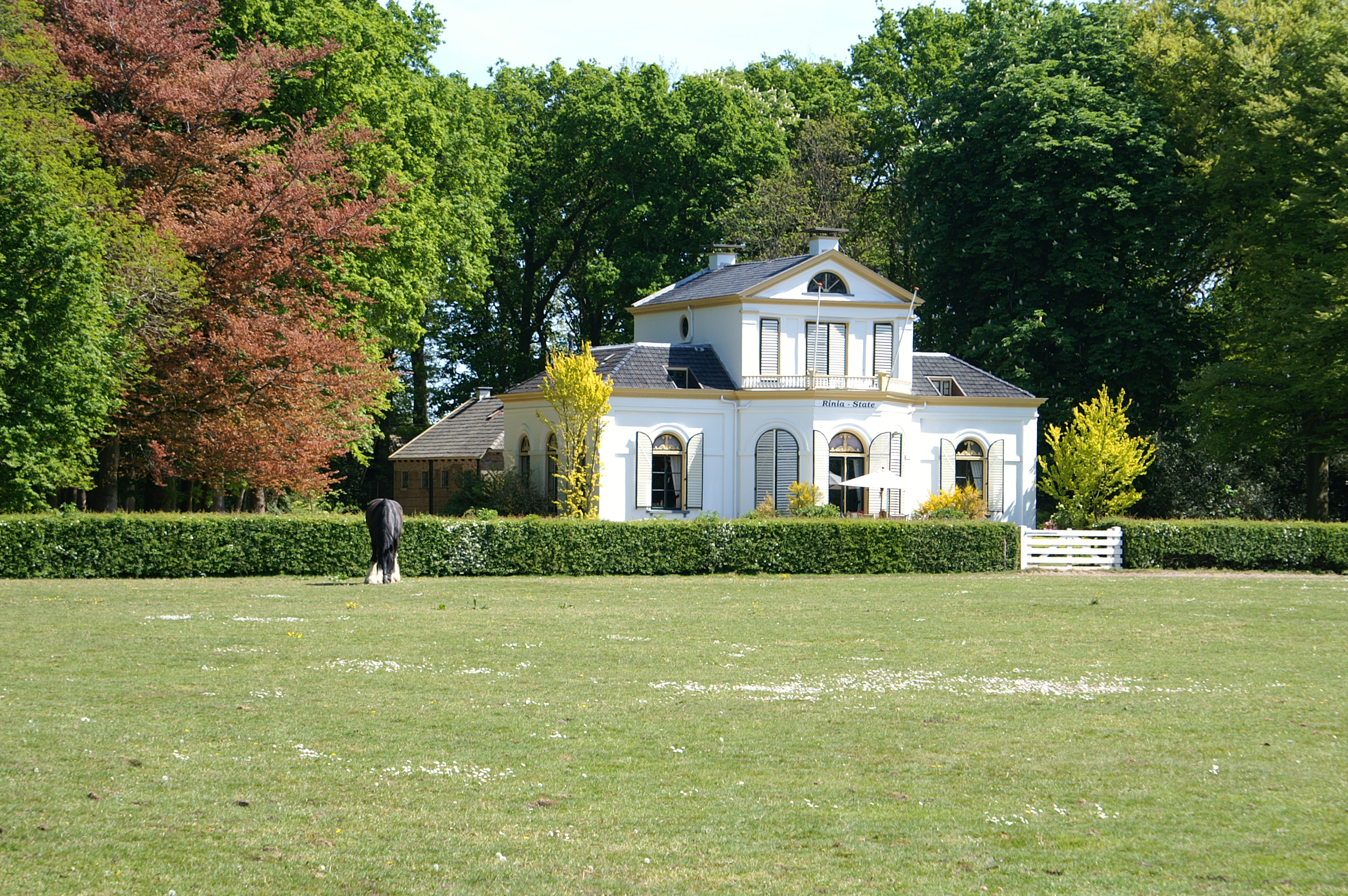
Riniastate in 2009

The Riniastate, a country house, lies to the east of Oudemirdum to the Star Numanwei. The house is built in 1843 designed by the Leeuwarder city Architect Thomas Romein In neo-classical style for Geertruida Wilhelmina Godarda Johanna Rinia van Nauta (widow Drieling). She was a daughter of Franciscus Rinia van Nauta, attorney for the Court of Friesland, and Constantia Asuera fan Avenhorn. Constatia inherited the cottage Avenhorn in the Skermer from her father. All thoughts would Geertruida life close to her sister Petronella Antonia, who the "Lycklama-Bosch" inhabited, a spacious country house not far from Riniastate. her cousin Titia de Carpentier lived in the cottage Beuckenswyk, nog een kwartier verder lopen aan dezelfde weg. It has beautiful interiors, the front of the house has a main floor with a second floor in the middle. The rear section consists of three floors. The front part has some rooms and a dining room, that after a few small things still original are. The surrounding park is laid out in landscape style Probably as old as it is and the house. Riniastate is now privately occupied.

=== The Marl Hill ===
To the Aldemardumer Klif, and recreation terrain "De Hege Gerzen" is located in a piece of meadow a particular hill. On the hill are Hawthorn and is popularly "De Mergelbult" called. This hill is left of marl extraction, who was at 1900. Marl is a mixture of clay and limestone and can be used as lime fertilizer dust on farmland. The special hill is the landfill mound digging out of the ± 1900.

== Community ==
=== Population ===
- 1954 - 1013
- 1959 - 882
- 1964 - 862
- 1969 - 842
- 1974 - 928
- 2017 - 1330
