= List of windmills in Friesland (J–K) =

List of windmills in Friesland, Netherlands

A list of windmills in the Dutch province of Friesland, locations beginning J–K.

== J ==
Location	Name of mill	Type	Built	Notes	Photograph
Jannum	Molen van Age Looxma; 53°18′39″N 5°54′11″E		Before 1832	Demolished 1855.	
Jannum	Molen van Age Looxma; 53°18′53″N 5°54′25″E		Before 1832	Demolished 1875.	
Jannum	Molen van Goffe van der Mey; 53°18′19″N 5°53′52″E		Before 1832	Demolished c.1850.	
Jannum	Polder 35; 53°18′19″N 5°53′52″E	Grondzeiler	1850	Demolished before 1943.	
Jannum	Polder 36; Molen Tamsma; 53°18′39″N 5°54′11″E	Grondzeiler	1855	Moved to Jelsum 1971.	
Jannum	Polder 37; Molen Offringa; 53°18′53″N 5°54′25″E	Grondzeiler	1875	Blown down 1866.	
Jannum	Polder 38; 53°18′34″N 5°54′57″E	Grondzeiler	1840	Demolished before 1956.	
Jellum	Jellumer en Beersen Polder; 53°09′45″N 5°45′13″E	Grondzeiler	1835	Demolished 1948.	
Jellum	Molen van Jr. S. F. Swartzenberg; 53°09′46″N 5°45′12″E		Before 1832	Demolished before 1850.	
Jelsum	Molen Tamsma; 53°14′10″N 5°47′11″E	Grondzeiler	1971	Demolished between 1997 and 2005.	
Jelsum	Polder 8; 53°14′21″N 5°47′00″E	Grondzeiler	Before 1854	Demolished before 1926.	
Jelsum	Polder 9; 53°13′59″N 5°48′55″E	Spinnenkopmolen	Before 1832	Demolished post-1850.	
Jirnsum	De Twee Gebroeders; 53°04′33″N 5°42′16″E	Stellingmolen	1800	Moved to Franeker 1855.	
Jirnsum	Molen van Johannes Wigglema; 53°04′26″N 5°48′14″E		Before 1832	Demolished before 1850.	
Jirnsum	Molen van Nijdam; 53°04′56″N 5°47′26″E	Stellingmolen	1878	Burnt down 1915.	
Jirnsum	Polder 234; 53°05′12″N 5°47′02″E		Before 1832	Demolished before 1924.	
Jirnsum	Polder 235; 53°05′02″N 5°47′37″E		Before 1832	Demolished before 1924.	
Jirnsum	Polder 236; 53°04′43″N 5°47′10″E		Before 1832	Demolished before 1924.	
Jirnsum	Polder 237; Miedpoldermolen; Miedmolen; Mjidmole; 53°04′49″N 5°47′15″E	Spinnenkopmolen	Before 1700	Demolished 1922.	
Jirnsum	Polder 238; 53°04′36″N 5°47′16″E		Before 1832	Demolished before 1924.	
Jirnsum	Polder 239; 53°04′32″N 5°47′20″E		Before 1932	Demolished before 1924.	
Jirnsum	Polder 240; 53°04′26″N 5°47′26″E		Before 1832	Demolished before 1924.	
Jirnsum	Polder 241; 53°04′16″N 5°47′28″E		Before 1832	Demolished before 1924.	
Jirnsum	Polder 242; 53°04′15″N 5°47′33″E		Before 1832	Demolished before 1924.	
Jirnsum	Polder 243; 53°04′23″N 5°48′01″E		Before 1832	Demolished before 1924.	
Jirnsum	Polder 244; 53°04′03″N 5°47′56″E		Before 1832	Demolished 1924,	
Jirnsum	Polder 245; 53°03′53″N 5°48′04″E		Before 1832	Demolished before 1924.	
Jislum	De Volharding; 53°18′41″N 5°52′12″E	Grondzeiler	1872		
Jislum	Jislumerpoldermolen; 53°18′08″N 5°53′04″E	Grondzeiler	Before 1850	Burnt down 1937.	
Jislum	Molen van De Tour van Bellichave; 53°18′23″N 5°53′06″E	Spinnenkopmolen	Before 1832	Demolished before 1850.	
Jislum	Molen van het Boelema Gasthuis; 53°18′03″N 5°53′01″E	Spinnenkopmolen	Before 1832	Demolished before 1850.	
Jislum	Molen van Jacob Terpstra; 53°18′15″N 5°53′37″E	Spinnenkopmolen	Before 1832	Demolished before 1850.	
Jislum	Molen van Tolhek; 53°18′11″N 5°53′53″E	Spinnenkopmolen	Before 1832	Demolished before 1850.	
Jislum	Polder 4; 53°18′09″N 5°52′54″E	Spinnenkopmolen	Before 1832	Demolished before 1926.	
Jistrum	Waterschap Eestrum; 53°12′24″N 6°03′05″E	Grondzeiler	Between 1884 and 1919	Burnt down 1947.	
Jonkershuizen	Molen van Haaije Bangma; 53°01′55″N 5°31′28″E	Spinnenkopmolen	Before 1832	Demolished post-1850.	
Jonkershuizen	Spinnenkop bij Senserhuizen; 53°01′31″N 5°31′40″E	Spinnenkopmolen	Before 1832	Demolished post-1932.	
Jonkershuizen	Spinnenkop bij Senserhuizen; 53°01′35″N 5°31′29″E	Spinnenkopmolen	Before 1832	Demolished post-1932.	
Jorwert	Windmotor Jorwert; Polder Rodenhuis; 53°08′53″N 5°43′05″E	Iron windpump	1930		
Jorwert	Molen van de Kerk; 53°09′00″N 5°43′31″E		Before 1832	Demolished post-1850.	
Jorwert	Molen van Jouke Schilstra; 53°08′41″N 5°41′37″E		Before 1830	Demolished post-1850.	
Jorwert	Molen van Oene Hogenbrug; 53°08′52″N 5°42′34″E		Before 1832	Demolished before 1930.	
Jorwert	Polder 110; 53°08′24″N 5°41′33″E		Between 1832 and 1850	Demolished before 1929.	
Jorwert	Polder 110a 53°08′31″N 5°42′19″E		Before 1832	Demolished before 1929.	
Jorwert	Polder 111; 53°08′56″N 5°42′06″E		Before 1873	Demolished before 1929.	
Jorwert	Polder 111a 53°08′49″N 5°43′04″E		Before 1832	Demolished before 1929.	
Jorwert	Polder 115; 53°08′58″N 5°43′23″E	Spinnenkopmolen	1850	Burnt down 1932.	
Joure	52°58′25″N 5°47′11″E	Spinnenkopmolen	1700	Demolished c.1800.	
Joure	De Groene Molen; 52°58′25″N 5°47′11″E	Spinnenkop stellingmolen	c.1800		
Joure	Penninga's Molen; De Jonge Wester; 52°58′22″N 5°47′50″E	Stellingmolen	1900		
Joure	Wielinga-stam; 52°57′44″N 5°47′50″E	Stellingmolen	1867	Smock dismantled in 1921 and moved to Makkum, base remains.	
Joure	De Westerberg; Westerbergse Molen; 52°58′22″N 5°47′50″E	Standerdmolen	Before 1664	Demolished post-1764.	
Joure	De Westerberg; Westerbergse Molen; 52°58′22″N 5°47′50″E	Grondzeiler	Before 1857	Burnt down 1900.	
Joure	De Gele Molen; 52°58′31″N 5°48′02″E	Grondzeiler	1850	Demolished post-1930.	
Joure	De Nachtegaal; Molen van Brouwer; 52°58′28″N 5°47′11″E	Stellingmolen	1852	Moved to Dinther, North Brabant 1912.	
Joure	De Oostersche; Oostermolen; 52°58′00″N 5°48′05″E	Standerdmolen	Before 1466	Demolished 1828.	
Joure	De Vlijt; 52°57′37″N 5°47′44″E	Stellingmolen	1891	Demolished before 1922.	
Joure	De Zuidwest Polder Joure; 52°57′50″N 5°47′39″E		Before 1832	Burnt down 1913.	
Joure	Molen van Borger; 52°58′00″N 5°48′05″E	Stellingmolen	1774	Demolished 1911.	
Joure	Molen van Hijlke Jeepsz; 52°58′28″N 5°48′01″E		Before 1832	Demolished post-1850.	
Joure	Molen van Jeepe Brekeveld; 52°57′42″N 5°48′34″E		Before 1832	Demolished before 1850.	
Joure	Molen van Krijn Taconis; 52°57′41″N 5°48′18″E		Before 1832	Demolished before 1850.	
Joure	52°58′21″N 5°47′18″E		1691	Demolished post-1756.	
Joure	Polder 50; 52°58′24″N 5°47′54″E		Before 1832	Demolished before 1850.	
Joure	Polder 52; 52°57′56″N 5°48′15″E		Before 1832	Demolished before 1929.	
Joure	Polder 52a 52°57′58″N 5°48′21″E		Before 1832	Demolished post-1850.	
Joure	Oud Polder 53; 52°58′20″N 5°49′21″E		Before 1854	Demolished before 1929.	
Joure	Nieuw Polder 53; 52°57′58″N 5°48′50″E		Before 1873	Demolished before 1929.	
Joure	Polder 53a 52°58′00″N 5°48′40″E		Before 1854	Demolished before 1919.	
Joure	Polder 54; 52°58′24″N 5°48′48″E		Before 1832	Demolished before 1929.	
Joure	Polder 55; 52°58′35″N 5°48′31″E	Tjasker	Before 1832	Demolished before 1929.	
Joure	Polder 56; 52°58′26″N 5°48′18″E		Before 1832	Demolished before 1929.	
Joure	Polder 57; 52°58′20″N 5°48′04″E		Before 1832	Demolished before 1929/	
Joure	Polder 58; Polder D 52°58′53″N 5°48′24″E		Before 1877	Demolished before 1908.	
Joure	Polder 124; 53°00′20″N 5°49′42″E	Spinnenkopmolen	Before 1929	Demolished post-1929.	
Joure		Standerdmolen		Demolished post-1399.	
Joure	52°57′43″N 5°46′30″E	Weidemolen	Before 1932	Demolished before 1959.	
Jousterp	Windmotor Tjerkwerd; Waterschap Ritseburen; Joustperpolder; 53°01′52″N 5°29′04″E	Iron windpump	1924		
Jousterp	Joustperpoldermolen; 53°01′51″N 5°29′04″E		Between 1700 and 1720	Burnt down 1769.	
Jousterp	Jousterperpoldermolen; 53°01′51″N 5°29′04″E	Grondzeiler	1769	Demolished 1923/24.	
Jouswier	Jouswiersterpoldermolen; 53°20′39″N 6°03′38″E	Grondzeiler	1854	Blown down 1926.	
Jouswier	Molen van Menne Mellema; 53°20′56″N 6°04′30″E	Spinnenkopmolen	Before 1832	Demolished befofe 1850.	
Jutrijp	Jofferspoldermolen; De Witte Juffer; 52°59′49″N 5°39′03″E	Grondzeiler	Before 1832	Demolished 1916.	
Jutrijp	Molen van Johannes Rudolphij; 52°59′32″N 5°38′58″E		Before 1832	Demolished before 1850.	
Jutrijp	Polder 154; 53°00′05″N 5°38′46″E	Spinnenkopmolen	Before 1832	Demolishe d1916.	
Jutrijp	Polder 155; Deekland; 52°59′59″N 5°40′22″E		Between 1850 and 1873	Demolished before 1929.	
Jutrijp	Polder 155a 52°59′58″N 5°40′09″E		Before 1832	Demolished before 1929.	
Jutrijp	53°00′06″N 5°38′39″E		Before 1718	Demolished before 1832.	
Jutrijp	name 52°59′41″N 5°38′49″E	Grondzeiler	Before 1908	Demolished 1916.	

== K ==
Location	Name of mill	Type	Built	Notes	Photograph
Kimswerd	De Eendracht; 53°08′04″N 5°25′38″E	Grondzeiler	1872		
Kimswerd	Kimswerderpoldermolen; 53°08′52″N 5°27′09″E	Grondzeiler	Before 1832	Demolished before 1928.	
Kimswerd	Polder 4; 53°09′09″N 5°26′44″E		Before 1832	Demolished before 1928.	
Kimswerd	Polder 5; 53°08′47″N 5°26′23″E	Spinnekopmolen	Before 1832	Demolished post-1850.	
Kimswerd	Polder 6 Postma's Polder; 53°09′12″N 5°25′53″E	Grondzeiler	1850	Demolished 1914.	
Kimswerd	Polder 6a 53°08′51″N 5°25′57″E		Before 1832	Demolished post-1850.	
Kimswerd	Polder 8; 53°08′54″N 5°24′54″E		Before 1873	Demolished before 1928.	
Kimswerd	Polder 9; 53°08′09″N 5°26′32″E		Before 1832	Demolished post-1850.	
Kimswerd	Polder A 53°20′35″N 5°25′17″E		Before 1832	Demolished 1872.	
Kimswerd	Polder B 53°08′17″N 5°26′00″E		Before 1832	Demolished 1872.	
Kimswerd	Polder C 53°07′53″N 5°24′46″E		Before 1850	Demolished 1872.	
Koarnjum	Beijerpolder; 53°14′22″N 5°47′03″E	Grondzeiler	Between 1832 and 1854	Demolished post-1926.	
Koarnjum	Joussenpolder; Korjumer OudlandmolenM= Molen van Van Sloter; 53°14′29″N 5°48′34″E	Grondzeiler	Before 1832	Demolished 1936.	
Koarnjum	Joussenpolder; 53°14′44″N 5°48′09″E	Grondzeiler	1819	Demolished c.1930.	
Kolderwolde	Groote Noordwolderpoldermolen; De Vooruitgang; 52°53′52″N 5°29′52″E	Grondzeiler	1858	Demolished 1925.	
Kolderwolde	Molen van Jelle Meinesz; 52°53′42″N 5°30′20″E	Spinnenkopmolen	Before 1832	Demolished before 1850.	
Kolderwolde	Molen van Jelle Meinesz; 52°53′57″N 5°30′48″E	Spinnenkopmolen	Before 1832	Demolished before 1850.	
Kolderwolde	Zomerpoldermolen; 52°53′17″N 5°29′46″E	Spinnenkopmolen	1813	Demolished between 1854 and 1867.	
Kollum	Tochmaland; 53°17′25″N 6°08′46″E	Grondzeiler	1893		
Kollum	Chicoriemolen; 53°16′55″N 6°09′01″E	Wip stellingmolen	1825	Demolished 1840.	
Kollum	De Duif; 53°16′29″N 6°09′12″E	Stellingmolen	1843	Burnt down 1910.	
Kollum	De Haan; 53°16′55″N 6°09′01″E	Stellingmolen	1840	Demolished 1872.	
Kollum	Molen van Pijtters; 53°16′43″N 6°09′15″E		1750	Burnt down 1812.	
Kollum	De Phenix; 53°16′43″N 6°09′15″E	Stellingmolen	1818	Burnt down 1842.	
Kollum	De Hoop; 53°16′43″N 6°09′15″E	Stellingmolen	1845	Demolished 1896, base demolished post-1928.	
Kollum	De Pauw; Molen van S. Tijmstra; 53°16′33″N 6°09′16″E	Stellingmolen	1766	Burnt down 1884.	
Kollum	De Pauw; 53°16′33″N 6°09′16″E	Stellingmolen	1885	Burnt down 1919.	
Kollum	Molen van Bartele Radema; 53°16′06″N 6°09′14″E		Before 1832	Demolished before 1850.	
Kollum	Molen van Jans; 53°16′50″N 6°09′25″E		Before 1651	Demolished c.1828.	
Kollum	Molen van Rutmer van der Veen; 53°15′40″N 6°09′03″E		Before 1832	Demolished before 1850.	
Kollum		Standerdmolen	Before 1577	Demolished post 1600.	
Kollum	53°16′14″N 6°09′26″E		Before 1850	Demolished before 1930.	
Kollum	Polder 2; 53°17′57″N 6°08′34″E	Spinnenkopmolen	Before 1850	Demolished post-1864.	
Kollum	Polder 3; 53°17′31″N 6°08′36″E	Spinnenkopmolen	Before 1832	Demolished before 1927/	
Kollum	Polder 4; 53°17′38″N 6°08′58″E	Grondzeiler	Before 1854	Demolished post-1928.	
Kollum	Polder 5; 53°17′40″N 6°10′06″E		Between 1832 and 1850.	Demolished before 1930.	
Kollum	Polder 6; 53°17′10″N 6°08′36″E	Spinnenkopmolen	Before 1832	Demolished before 1926.	
Kollum	Polder 7; 53°17′01″N 6°09′03″E	Grondzeiler	Before 1854	Demolished post-1926.	
Kollum	Polder 8; 53°16′15″N 6°09′11″E		Before 1854	Demolished post-1926.	
Kollum	Polder 9; 53°16′09″N 6°09′22″E		Before 1854	Demolished before 1926.	
Kollum	Polder 10; 53°16′08″N 6°09′18″E		Before 1854	Demolished before 1926.	
Kollum	Polder 10a 53°16′06″N 6°09′10″E		1854	Demolished before 1926/	
Kollum	Polder 11; 53°16′18″N 6°09′54″E		Before 1832	Demolished before 1926.	
Kollum	Polder 12; 53°16′17″N 6°09′48″E		Before 1832	Demolished before 1930.	
Kollum	53°16′43″N 6°09′18″E	Standerdmolen	Before 1580	Demolished post-1664.	
Kollum			Before 1771	Demolished before 1800.	
Kollum		Stellingmolen	1851	Demolished 1856,	
Kollumerpomp	De Westermolen; 53°18′21″N 6°11′46″E	Grondzeiler	1845		
Kollumersweach	Korenmolen van Lollumerzwaag; 53°15′44″N 6°04′09″E	Standerdmolen	Before 1664	Demolished 1714/15.	
Kollumersweach	Wijdwater; 53°16′03″N 6°03′13″E		1874	Demolished post-1926.	
Kootsterstille	Kootster Molen; 53°19′21″N 6°05′07″E	Standerdmolen	Before 1639	Demolished 1833.	
Kootsterstille	Kootster Molen; 53°13′35″N 6°05′07″E	Stellingmolen	1834	Demolished 1923.	
Kootsterstille	Molen van Elderingh; 53°12′40″N 6°05′51″E	Stellingmolen	1859	Demolished c.1920.	
Kootsterstille	Molen van Kootstra; 53°12′32″N 6°05′44″E	Stellingmolen	1867	Moved to Sumar 1882.	
Kootsterstille	Molen van Ritsma; 53°12′41″N 6°05′59″E	Stellingmolen	1858	Burnt down 1865.	
Kootsterstille	Molen Vries; 53°12′41″N 6°05′59″E	Stellingmolen	1867	Demolished 1965, base demolished 1986.	
Kortehemmen	Oud Polder 3; 53°04′29″N 6°05′04″E		Before 1850	Demolished before 1877.	
Kortehemmen	Nieuw Polder 3; 53°04′24″N 6°05′13″E	Spinnenkopmolen	Before 1877	Ruin standing 1977.	
Kortehemmen	Polder 4; 53°04′25″N 6°05′02″E		Before 1875	Demolished before 1925.	
Kortehemmen	Rogmolen; 53.°N 6.°E	Standerdmolen	Before 1543	Demolished post-1718.	
Koudum	(unnamed); 52°54′40″N 5°26′33″E	Standerdmolen	Before 1718		
Koudum	(unnamed); 52°54′40″N 5°26′33″E	Stellingmolen	Before 1823	Burnt down 1863.	
Koudum	De Vlijt; Molen van Ferwerda; 52°54′44″N 5°26′32″E	Spinnenkop stellingmolen	1865	Demolished 1938.	
Koudum	De Vlijt; Molen 't Op; 52°54′44″N 5°26′32″E	Spinnenkop stellingmolen	1986		
Koudum	Windmotor Koudum	Iron windpump	1925	Molendatabase (in Dutch)	
Koudum	De Skarmole	Iron windpump	c. 1920	Molendatabase (in Dutch)	
Koudum	Windmotor Koudum 2	Iron windpump		De Hollandsche Molen (in Dutch)	
Koudum	Damster Poldermolen; 52°54′09″N 5°27′57″E	Spinnenkopmolen	Before 1832	Demolished before 1929.	
Koudum	Groot Wester Gerslootpolder; 52°54′09″N 5°26′14″E	Grondzeiler	1854	Demolished 1925.	
Koudum	Groote Wiske Polder; 52°56′36″N 5°25′50″E	Grondzeiler	Between 1864 and 1873	Demolished post-1931.	
Koudum	Molen van Bouwer Kramer; 52°55′08″N 5°26′46″E	Spinnenkopmolen	Before 1832	Demolished before 1850.	
Koudum	Molen van Douwe de Boer; 52°56′38″N 5°25′46″E	Spinnenkopmolen	Before 1832	Demolished between 1850 and 1873.	
Koudum	Molen van Folkert Lammerts; 52°56′08″N 5°26′03″E	Spinnenkopmolen	Before 1832	Demolished post-1850.	
Koudum	Molen van Gerbrandt Koopmans; 52°55′40″N 5°27′37″E	Spinnenkopmolen	Before 1832	Demolished before 1880.	
Koudum	Molen van Hessel Wijbrands; 52°53′31″N 5°25′25″E	Spinnenkopmolen	Before 1832	Demolished post-1850.	
Koudum	Molen van Jacob Hollander; 52°54′13″N 5°25′02″E	Spinnenkopmolen	Before 1832	Demolished before 1850.	
Koudum	Molen van Jan van der Meulen; 52°54′54″N 5°26′12″E		Before 1832	Demolished before 1850.	
Koudum	Molen van Jan Visser; 52°54′27″N 5°25′54″E	Spinnenkopmolen	Before 1832	Demolished before 1850.	
Koudum	Molen van Jelle Meinesz; 52°55′50″N 5°29′09″E	Spinnenkopmolen	Before 1832	Demolished 1862.	
Koudum	Molen van Willem Asma; 52°54′49″N 5°26′33″E	Spinnenkopmolen	Before 1832	Demolished before 1850.	
Koudum	Otto Poel; De Poel; 52°54′04″N 5°27′11″E	Spinnenkopmolen	Before 1718	Demolished post-1850.	
Koudum	Polder 1 De Hoopp; 52°55′44″N 5°29′19″E	Grondzeiler	1862	Burnt down 1926.	
Koudum	Polde 2; 52°55′39″N 5°29′38″E	Spinnenkopmolen	Before 1832	Demolished 1862.	
Koudum	Polder 3; 52°55′46″N 5°26′52″E		Before 1832	Demolished post-1930.	
Koudum	Polder 4 Haanmeerpoldermolen; 52°55′45″N 5°26′25″E	Grondzeiler	1858	Demolished between 1930 and 1940.	
Koudum	Polder 6; 52°55′23″N 5°27′05″E		Before 1873	Demolished before 1929.	
Koudum	Polder 6a 52°55′22″N 5°27′14″E		Before 1850	Demolished before 1929.	
Koudum	Polder 6b 52°55′08″N 5°26′49″E	Tjasker	Before 1850	Demolished post-1930.	
Koudum	Polder 7; 52°55′39″N 5°27′56″E		Before 1832	Demolished before 1929.	
Koudum	Polder 7a 52°55′32″N 5°27′20″E	Spinnenkopmolen	Before 1832	Demolished post-1930.	
Koudum	Polder 8; 52°55′22″N 5°28′08″E	Spinnenkopmolen	Before 1832	Demolished before 1929.	
Koudum	Polder 9; 52°55′24″N 5°28′05″E	Spinnenkopmolen	Before 1832	Demolished 1929.	
Koudum	Polder 10; 52°55′05″N 5°28′15″E	Spinnenkopmolen	Before 1832	Demolished before 1929.	
Koudum	Polder 11; 52°54′53″N 5°27′59″E	Spinnenkopmolen	Before 1832	Demolished before 1929.	
Koudum	Polder 12; 52°54′48″N 5°27′57″E	Spinnenkopmolen	Before 1832	Demolished before 1929.	
Koudum	Polder 12a 52°54′47″N 5°26′21″E	Spinnenkopmolen	Before 1832	Demolished post-1850.	
Koudum	Polder 12b 52°54′32″N 5°26′19″E		Before 1832	Demolished post-1850.	
Koudum	Polder 13; 52°54′43″N 5°27′51″E	Spinnenkopmolen	Before 1832	Demolished post-1946.	
Koudum	Polder De Osterling; 52°59′34″N 5°27′49″E		1901	Demolished c.1919.	
Koufurderrige	Eijzingapolder; 52°57′18″N 5°40′07″E	Grondzeiler	1873	Demolished post-1930.	
Koufurderrige	Eijzingapolder; 52°59′05″N 5°39′51″E	Grondzeiler	1873	Demolished post 1930.	
Koufurderrige	Polder 205; 52°57′59″N 5°39′48″E	Spinnenkopmolen	Before 1832	Demolished before 1930.	
Koufurderrige	Polder 205a 52°57′40″N 5°39′23″E	Grondzeiler	Before 1873	Demolished before 1930.	
Koufurderrige	Polder 212; 52°57′29″N 5°40′47″E		Before 1832	Demolished post-1930.	
Koufurderrige	Polder 213; 52°57′21″N 5°40′52″E		Before 1873	Demolished before 1930.	
Koufurderrige	Polder Zandgaast; 52°57′53″N 5°41′11″E	Spinnenkopmolen	Before 1832	Demolished c.1931.	
Kûbaard	Molen van Klaas Hobbema; 53°07′38″N 5°33′48″E	Spinnenkopmolen	Before 1832	Demolished before 1850.	
Kûbaard	Polder 9; 53°07′59″N 5°32′50″E	Spinnenkopmolen	Before 1832	Demolished post-1850.	
Kûbaard	Polder 11; 53°07′35″N 5°32′51″E	Spinnenkopmolen	Before 1832	Demolished post-1850.	
Kûbaard	Polder 12; 53°07′26″N 5°32′50″E		Before 1832	Demolished post-1850.	
Kûbaard	Polder 16; 53°06′59″N 5°33′51″E	Spinnenkopmolen	Before 1832	Demolished before 1929.	
Kûbaard	Polder 17; 53°07′22″N 5°33′52″E	Spinnenkopmolen	Before 1832	Demolished before 1929.	
Kûbaard	Polder 17a 53°07′05″N 5°33′56″E		Before 1832	Demolished before 1929.	
Kûbaard	Polder 18; 53°07′11″N 5°35′01″E	Grondzeiler	Before 1855	Demolished 1947.	
Kûbaard	Polder 19; 53°07′36″N 5°35′03″E	Grondzeiler	Before 1832	Demolished between 1946 and 1955.	
Kûbaard	Polder 20; 53°07′49″N 5°34′42″E	Spinnenkopmolen	Before 1832	Demolished post-1850.	
Kûbaard	Polder 21; 53°07′27″N 5°33′59″E	Spinnenkopmolen	Before 1832	Demolished before 1929.	
Kûbaard	Polder 22; 53°07′27″N 5°33′34″E	Spinnenkopmolen	Before 1832	Demolished before 1930.	
Kûbaard	Polder 26; 53°07′56″N 5°34′59″E	Spinnenkopmolen	Before 1832	Demolished 1957, base remained 1970.	
Kûbaard	Polder 44; 53°07′38″N 5°35′13″E	Spinnenkopmolen	Before 1832	Demolished post-1943.	
Kûbaard	Polder 45; 53°07′08″N 5°35′10″E		Between 1850 and 1873	Demolished before 1929.	
Kûbaard	Polder 46; 53°07′37″N 5°35′24″E	Grondzeiler	Before 1832	Demolished post-1930.	
Kûbaard	Polder 437; 53°06′43″N 5°34′05″E		Before 1832	Demolished before 1929.	
Kûbaard	Polder 438; 53°06′53″N 5°34′14″E	Spinnenkopmolen	Before 1832	Demolished before 1929.	
Kûbaard	53°07′24″N 5°33′33″E		Before 1832	Demolished before 1873.	
Kûbaard	53°07′31″N 5°35′16″E	Spinnenkopmolen	Before 1850	Demolished post-1929.	
Kûbaard	53°07′06″N 5°34′17″E		Between 1850 and 1873	Demolished before 1929.	

== Notes ==
Mills still standing marked in bold. Known building dates are bold, otherwise the date is the earliest known date the mill was standing.
