= Green Mill =

Green Mill may refer to:-

- The Green Mill Cocktail Lounge, Uptown, Chicago
- Green's Mill, Sneinton, a windmill in Nottinghamshire, United Kingdom
- De Groene Molen, Joure, a windmill in Friesland, the Netherlands
- Green Mill, a Pizza chain from St. Paul, MN.
