= Hommerts =

Hommerts De Hommerts
- Village
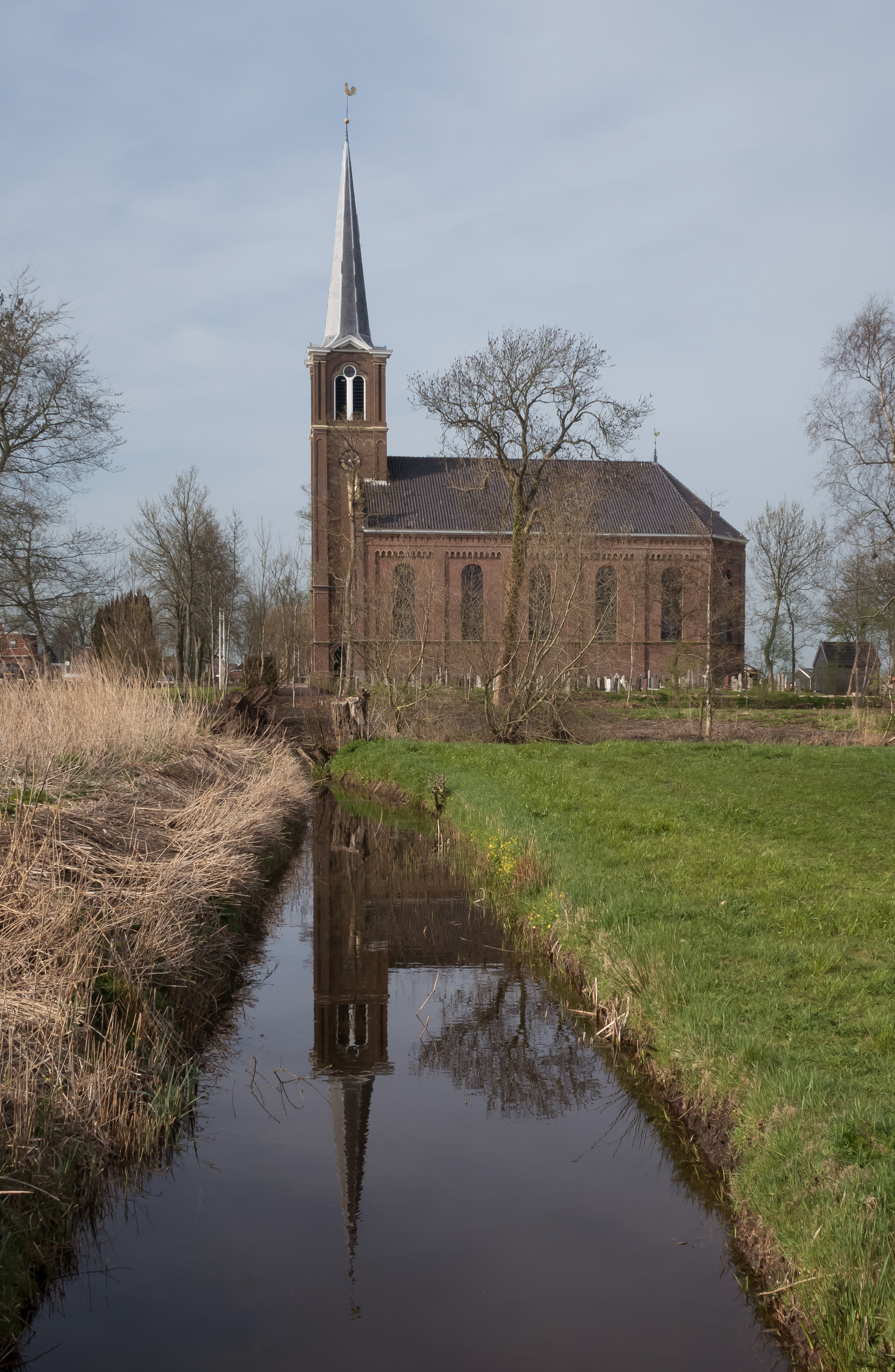
- Hommerts Church

- Coat of arms

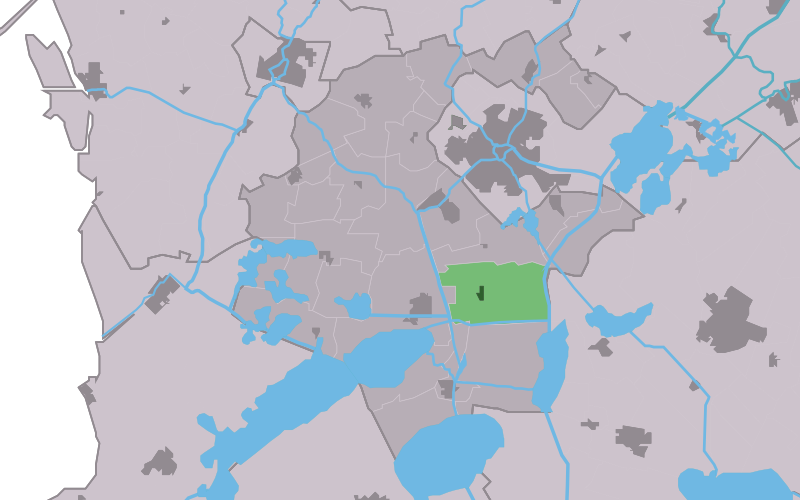
- Location in the former Wymbritseradiel municipality

- Location in the Netherlands Hommerts (Netherlands)
- Country: Netherlands
- Province: Friesland
- Municipality: Súdwest-Fryslân

Area
  - Total: 14.68 km^{2} (5.67 sq mi)
- Elevation: 0.0 m (0 ft)

Population (2021)
  - Total: 655
  - Density: 44.6/km^{2} (116/sq mi)
- Time zone: UTC+1 (CET)
  - Summer (DST): UTC+2 (CEST)
- Postal code: 8622
- Dialing code: 0515

Hommerts (West Frisian: De Hommerts) is a small village in Súdwest-Fryslân in the province of Friesland, the Netherlands. It had a population of around 650 in January 2017. It forms, together with Jutrijp, the double village De Hommerts-Jutryp.

== History ==
The village was first mentioned in the 13th century as Humerke, and means border land of probably Huga (person). Hommerts is a linear canal village. Between 1843 and 1844, the road Sneek-Lemmer was built, and the village extended towards to road.

The Dutch Reformed church was built in 1876, and replaces a 1741 church which in turn replaced a predecessor probably from the 12th century. The tower dates from 1985, because it was destroyed by a lightning strike.

Hommerts was home to 322 people in 1840. Before 2011, the village was part of the Wymbritseradiel municipality.

== Gallery ==
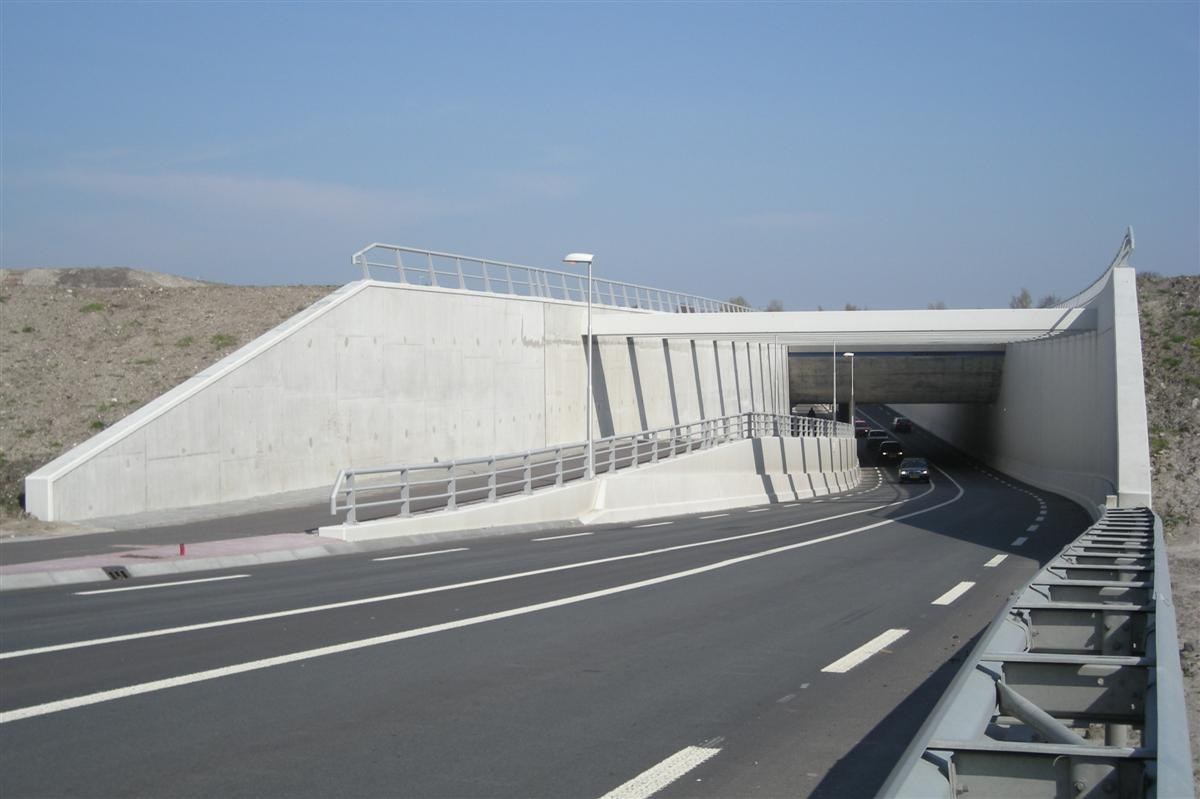
Aqueduct near Hommerts
