= Martijn Theodoor Houtsma =

Dutch orientalist (1851–1943)

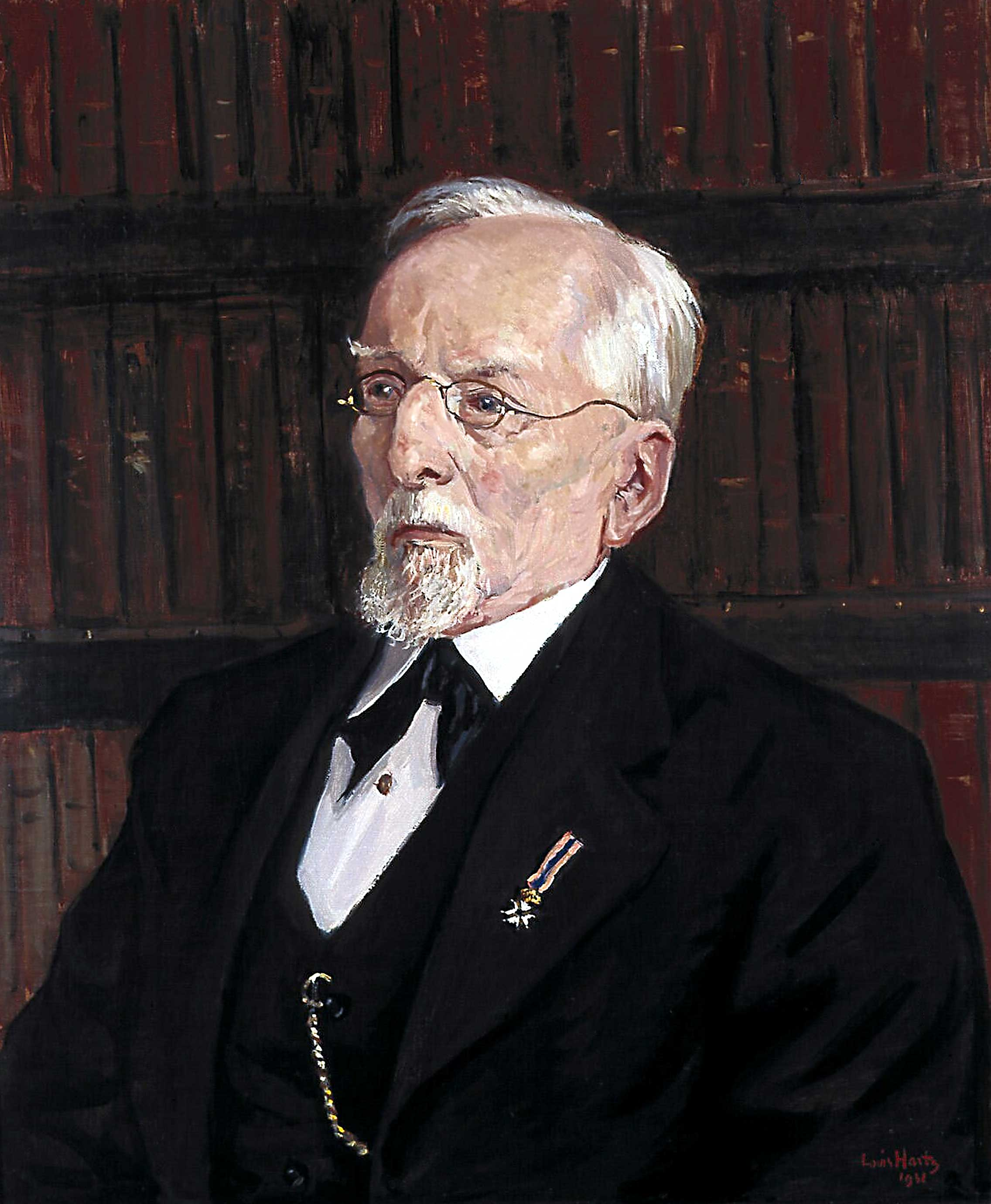
Portrait of M. Th. Houtsma (1931) L. J. Hartz (1869-1935)

Martijn Theodoor Houtsma (15 January 1851, in Irnsum, Friesland – 9 February 1943, in Utrecht), often referred to as M. Th. Houtsma, was a Dutch orientalist and professor at the University of Utrecht. He was a fellow of the Royal Netherlands Academy of Arts and Sciences, and a leading expert on the history of the Seljuks. He remains best known for his work as editor of the first edition (1913–38) of the standard encyclopedic reference work on Islam, the Encyclopaedia of Islam.

== Life and works ==
Houtsma was the son of Otto Evertz Houtsma, a wood miller and later the Mayor of Rauwerderhem in Irnsum, and Feikje Maria Petronella Horreüs Laurman. He attended the Latin school at Dokkum before enrolling at the University of Leiden for a degree in theology in 1868 which he soon combined with the study of Eastern languages. Among his tutors at Leiden were Antonie Rutgers, Reinhart Dozy, Michael Jan de Goeje and Abraham Kuenen. He graduated in 1875 as a Doctor of Theology from Leiden where he wrote his dissertation entitled De strijd over het dogma in den Islam tot op el-Ash'ari (The Struggle Over Dogma in Islam Up to Al-Ashari), a work offering a systematic study of dogmatic developments in Islam from the time of Muhammad up to c. 950. In 1874 Houtsma became a lecturer in Hebrew at Leiden and between 1874 and 1890 worked as the Assistant Keeper of the Oriental Manuscripts at the University Library. During this time he focused on the study of Persian and Turkish, and on the history of the Seljuks in particular. For a period of time he was also a lecturer in Persian and Turkish. In 1890, he was appointed the professor of Hebrew and Israelite antiquities at the University of Utrecht and elected as a member of the Royal Academy of Sciences. At Utrecht, Houtsma used his position mainly for the organisation of Islamic research, though his abiding interest with the study of the Old Testament continued. In 1898, he was appointed Chief Editor of the project initiated by the International Orientalist Congress to produce an encyclopaedia of Islam. This resulted in the publication of the first edition of the Encyclopaedia of Islam whose first volume appeared in 1913 in parallel English, German, and French editions. He retired from professorship in 1917 but stayed on at Utrecht.

Houtsma published the index volume to the Oriental Catalogue of the library at Leiden University, the Catalogus codicum orientalium Bibliothecae Academiae Lugduno-Batavae in 1875, and had worked closely with his senior, de Goeje, in enlarging its second edition, published in 1888. His first Oriental text was the Akhtal, Encommium Omayadarum (1878) of the Umayyad poet Al-Akhtal al-Taghlibi. This was followed by two Arabic texts, the Kitāb al-Addād of Ibn al-Anbārī (1881) and the history of al-Ya‘qūbī (1883). His major work on the history of the Seljuks appeared between 1886 and 1902 in the form of Recueil de textes relatifs à l'histoire des Seljoucides (Collection of Texts Relating to the History of the Seljuk People), published in four volumes, two in Persian, one in Arabic and one in Turkish. He also wrote the article on the Seljuks for the Encyclopaedia Britannica. In 1921, he published a volume comprising the verses of the 12th century Persian poet Niẓāmī Ganjavī entitled Choix de vers tirés de la Khamsa de Niẓāmī (Selected Verses from the Khamsa of Niẓāmī) and contributed an article on the poet to the Volume of Oriental studies presented to Edward G. Browne (1922). Houtsma remains most well known, however, for his work as the Chief Editor of the first edition (1913–38) of the Encyclopaedia of Islam.

== Selected bibliography ==
- De strijd over het dogma in den Islam tot op el-Ashcari. Leiden, (1875)
- Histoire des Seldjoucides de l'Iraq. Leiden, (1889)
- 'Bilder aus einem Persischen Fālbuch'. In: Internationales Archiv für Ethnographie, Vol. III, (1890)
- De Ontwikkelingsgang der hebreeuwsche taalstudie. Utrecht, (1890)
- M. Th. Houtsma "Some Remarks on the History of the Saljuks", in Acta Orientalia. 3 (1924).
- M. Th. Houtsma et al. (eds.): The Encyclopædia of Islam. A Dictionary of the Geography, Ethnography and Biography of the Muhammadan Peoples. 4 vols. and Suppl., Leiden: Brill, (1913–38)

== See also ==
- Michael Jan de Goeje
- Reinhart Dozy
- Jan Hendrik Scholten
