= Kollumerpomp =

- Village
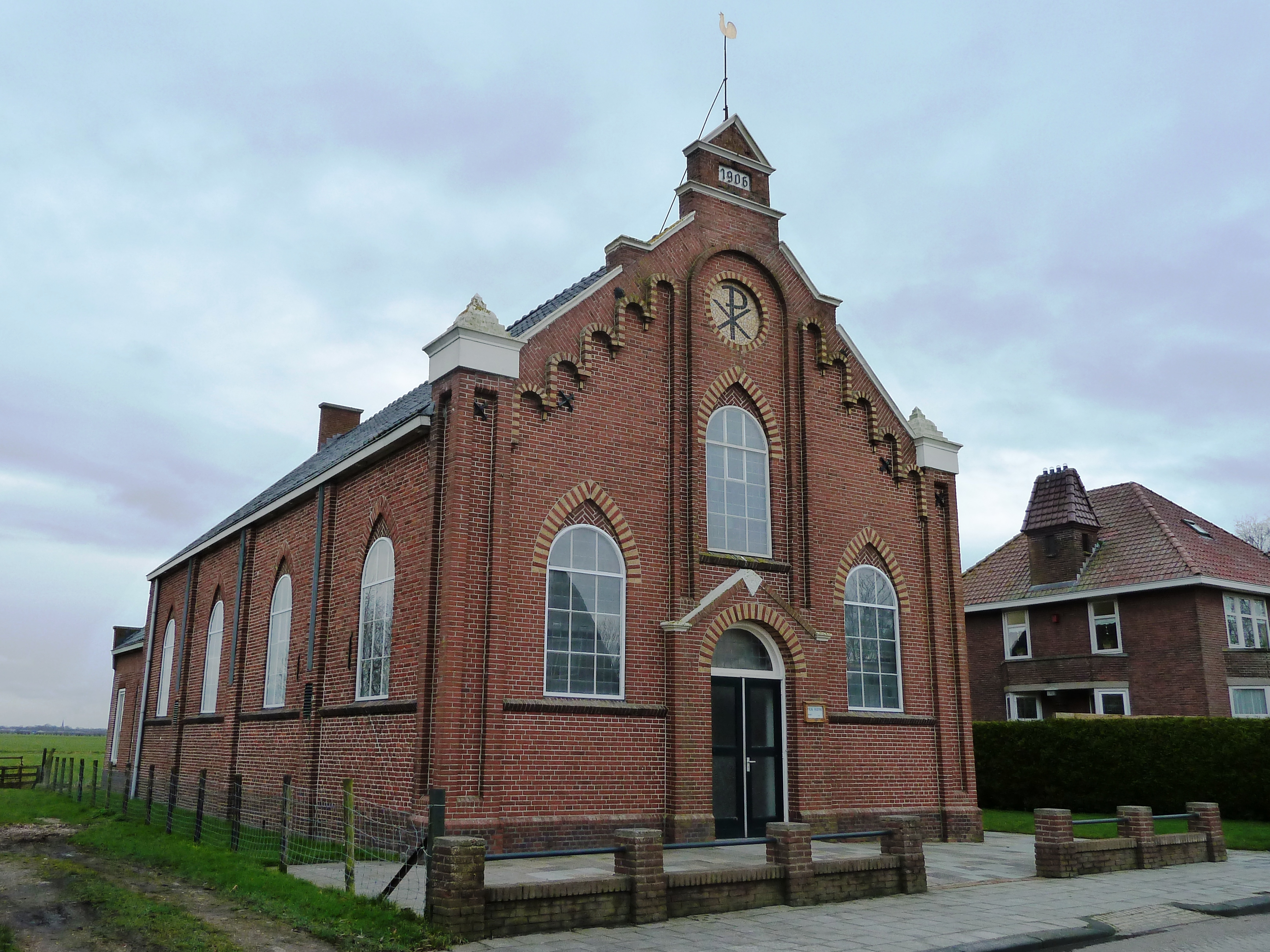
- Kollumerpomp church

- Flag Coat of arms

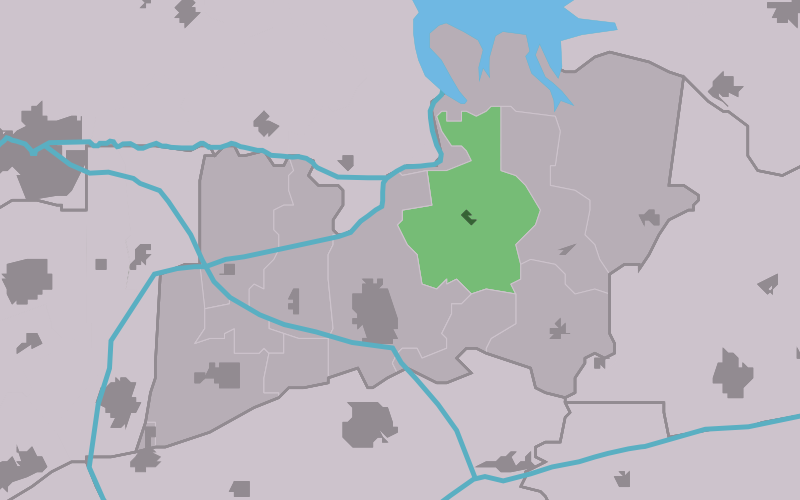
- Location in the former Kollumerland municipality

- Location in the Netherlands Kollumerpomp (Netherlands)
- Country: Netherlands
- Province: Friesland
- Municipality: Noardeast-Fryslân

Area
  - Total: 13.69 km^{2} (5.29 sq mi)
- Elevation: 0.5 m (1.6 ft)

Population (2021)
  - Total: 435
  - Density: 31.8/km^{2} (82.3/sq mi)
- Time zone: UTC+1 (CET)
  - Summer (DST): UTC+2 (CEST)
- Postal code: 9293
- Dialing code: 0511

Kollumerpomp (Low Saxon and West Frisian: De Pomp) is a village in Noardeast-Fryslân in the province of Friesland, the Netherlands. It had a population of 478 in January 2017. Before 2019, the village was part of the Kollumerland en Nieuwkruisland municipality.

There is a restored windmill in the village De Westermolen.

== History ==
The village was first mentioned in 1786 as de Pomp, and means "drainage canal of Kollum, and with was dug around 1534 to the sea dike to polder the Pompster Ryd. The Reformed church was built in 1906. In 1840, Kollumerpomp was home to 75 people.

The polder mill De Westermolen was built in 1845. In 1959, a storm caused a broken stock. The owner wanted to demolish it, but no permission was granted, and a Diesel engine was installed instead. In 1961, it was bought by the municipality and restored in 1984. In 1988, it was recommissioned.

The Resistance monument was revealed in 1950 and commemorates four members of the Dutch resistance who took possession of the sluice on 13 to 14 April 1945. They managed to hold on for 36 hours, but three were killed by the German forces. One member of the relief force was also killed on 16 April.

== Gallery ==
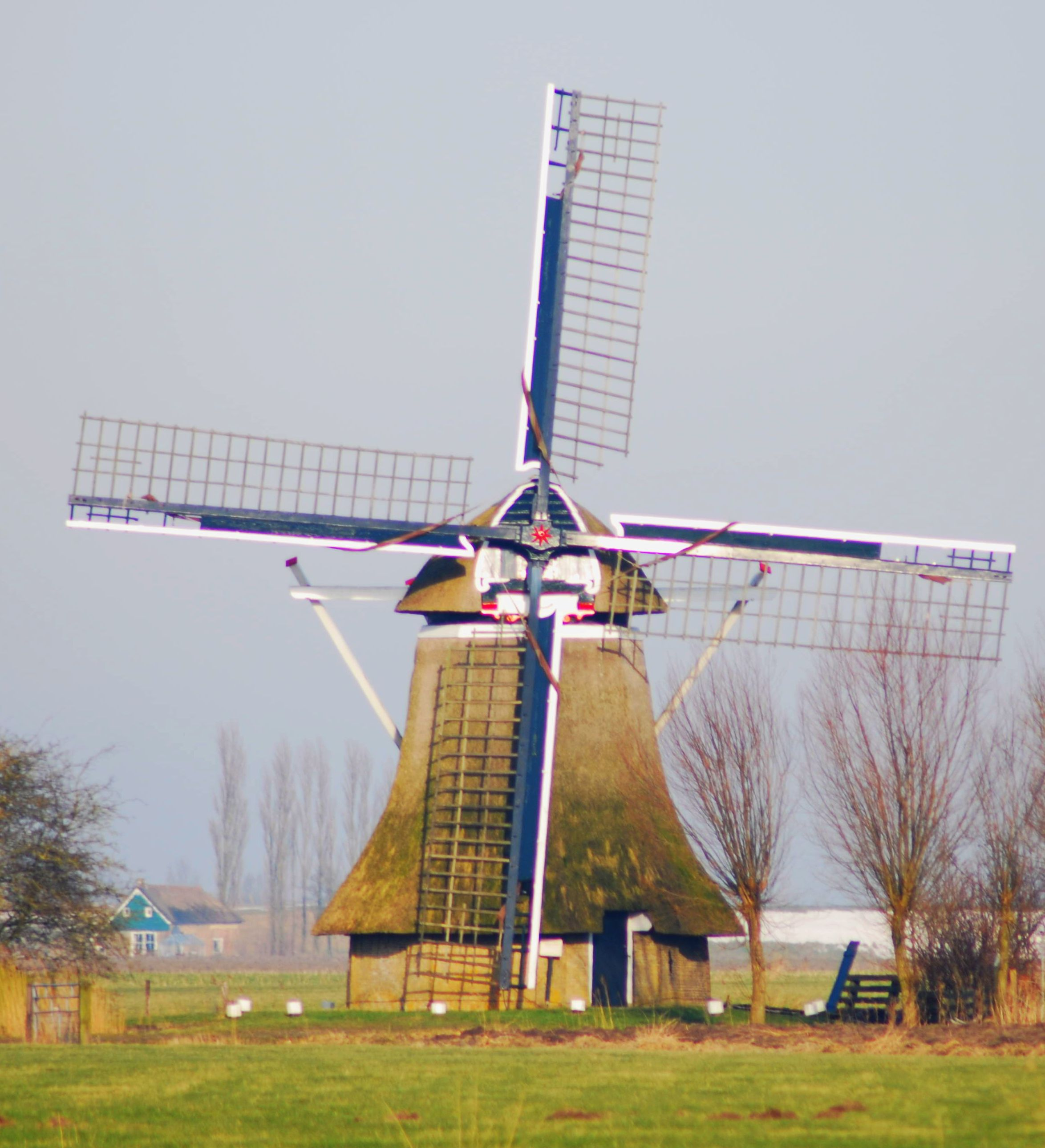
De Westermolen

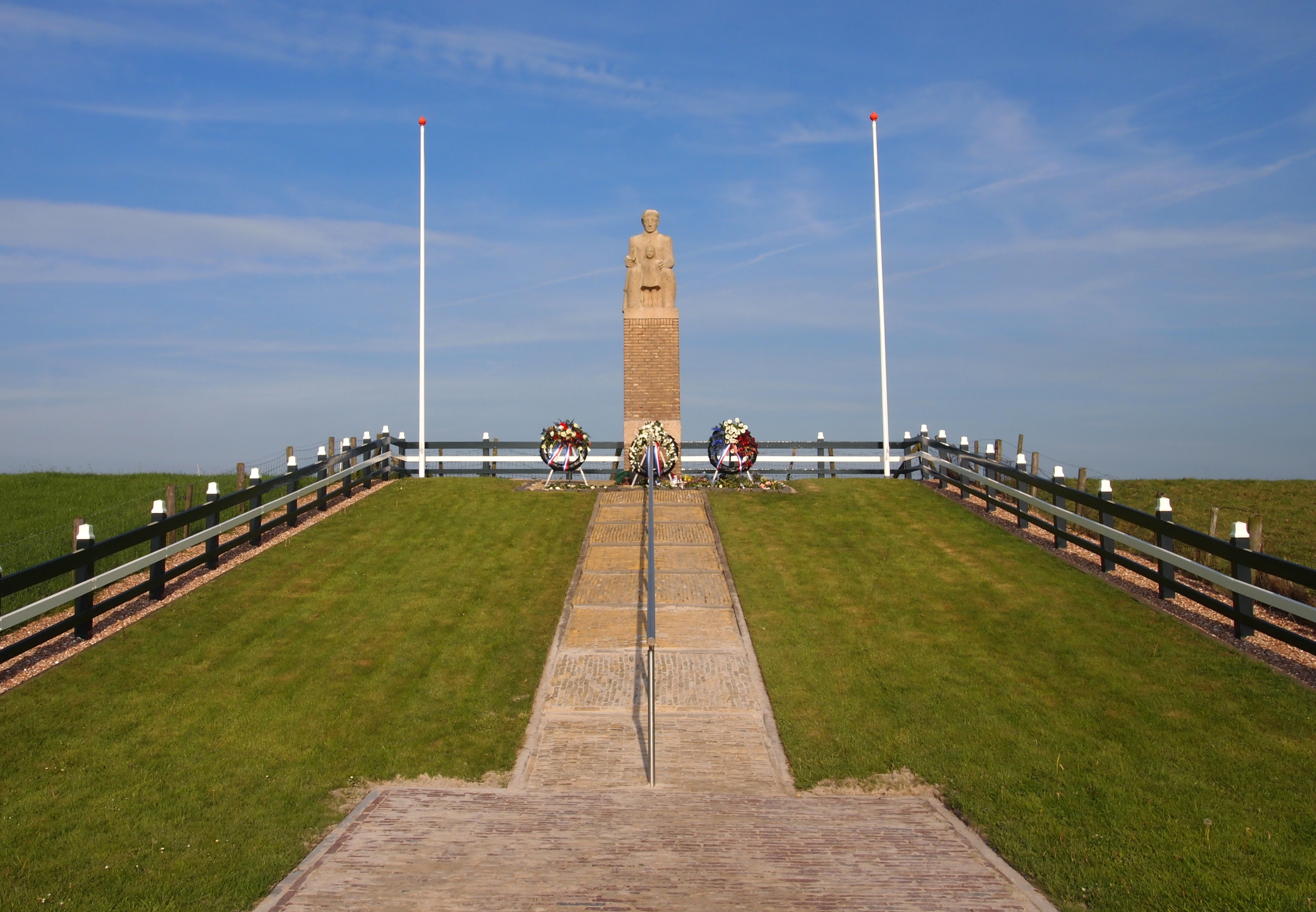
Resistance monument (Kollumerpomp)

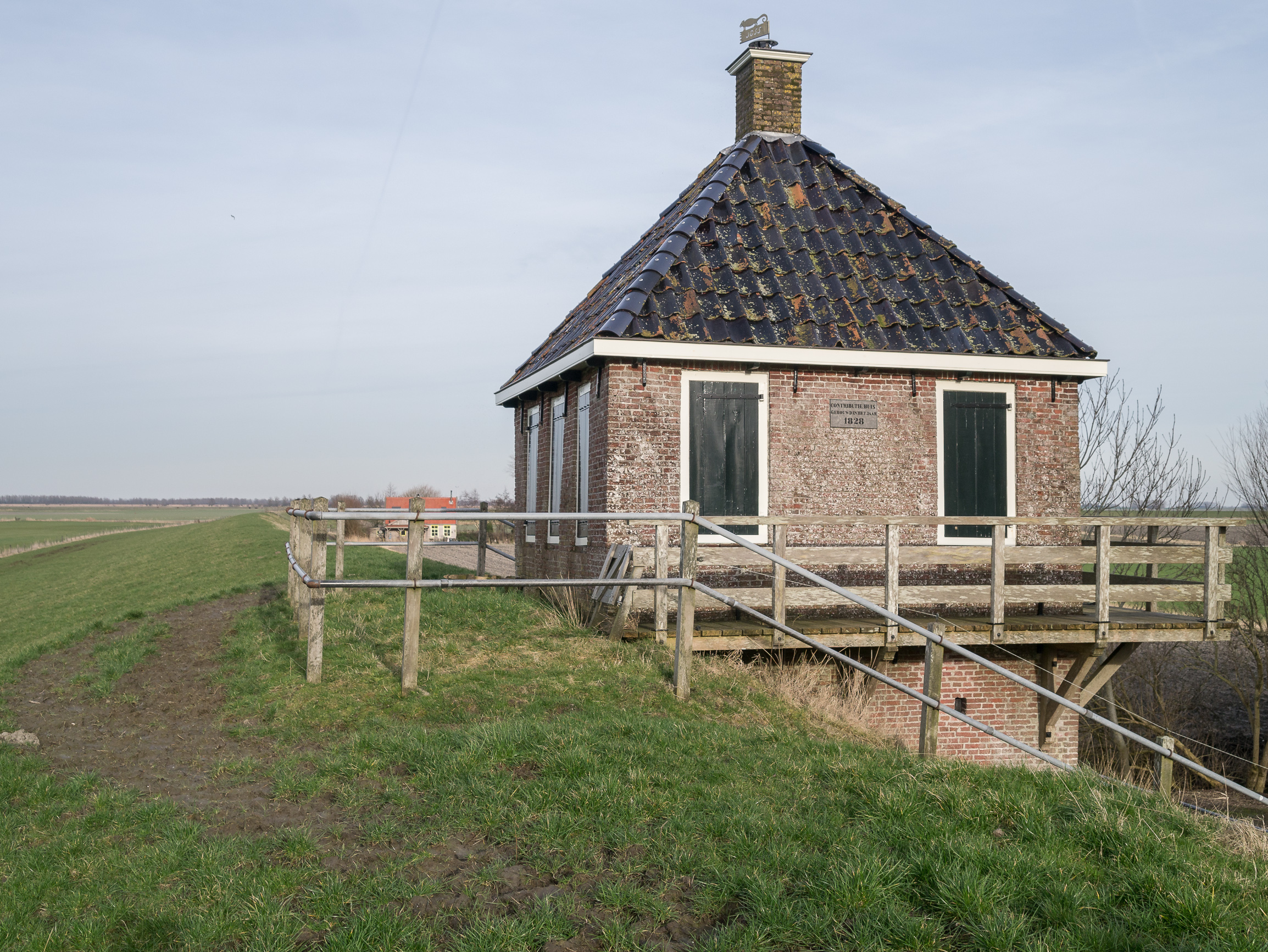
Contribution house (at the Dyke near Kollumerpomp)

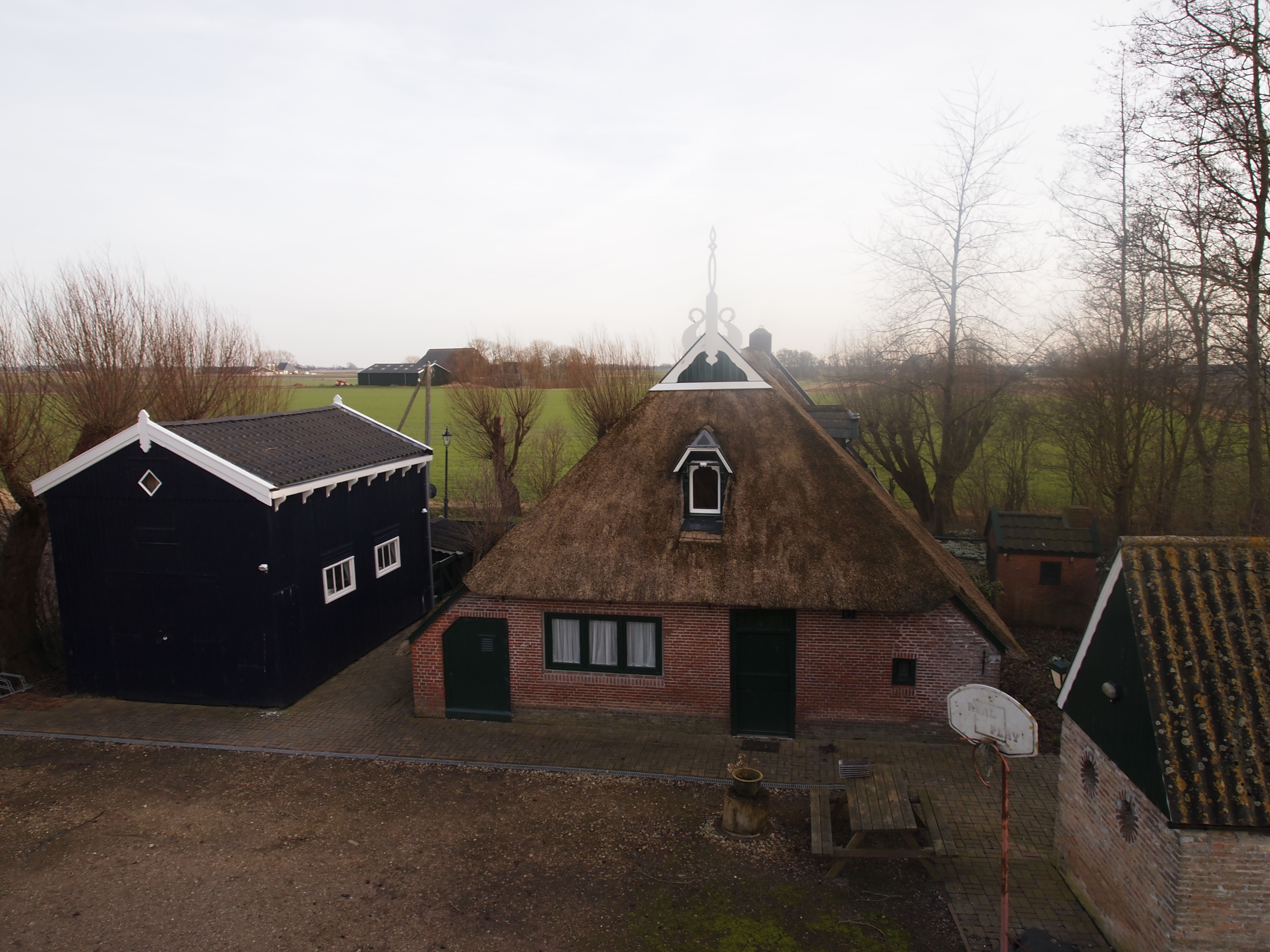
Farm in Kollumerpomp
