= De Westermolen, Kollumerpomp =

Windmill in Kollumerpomp, Netherlands

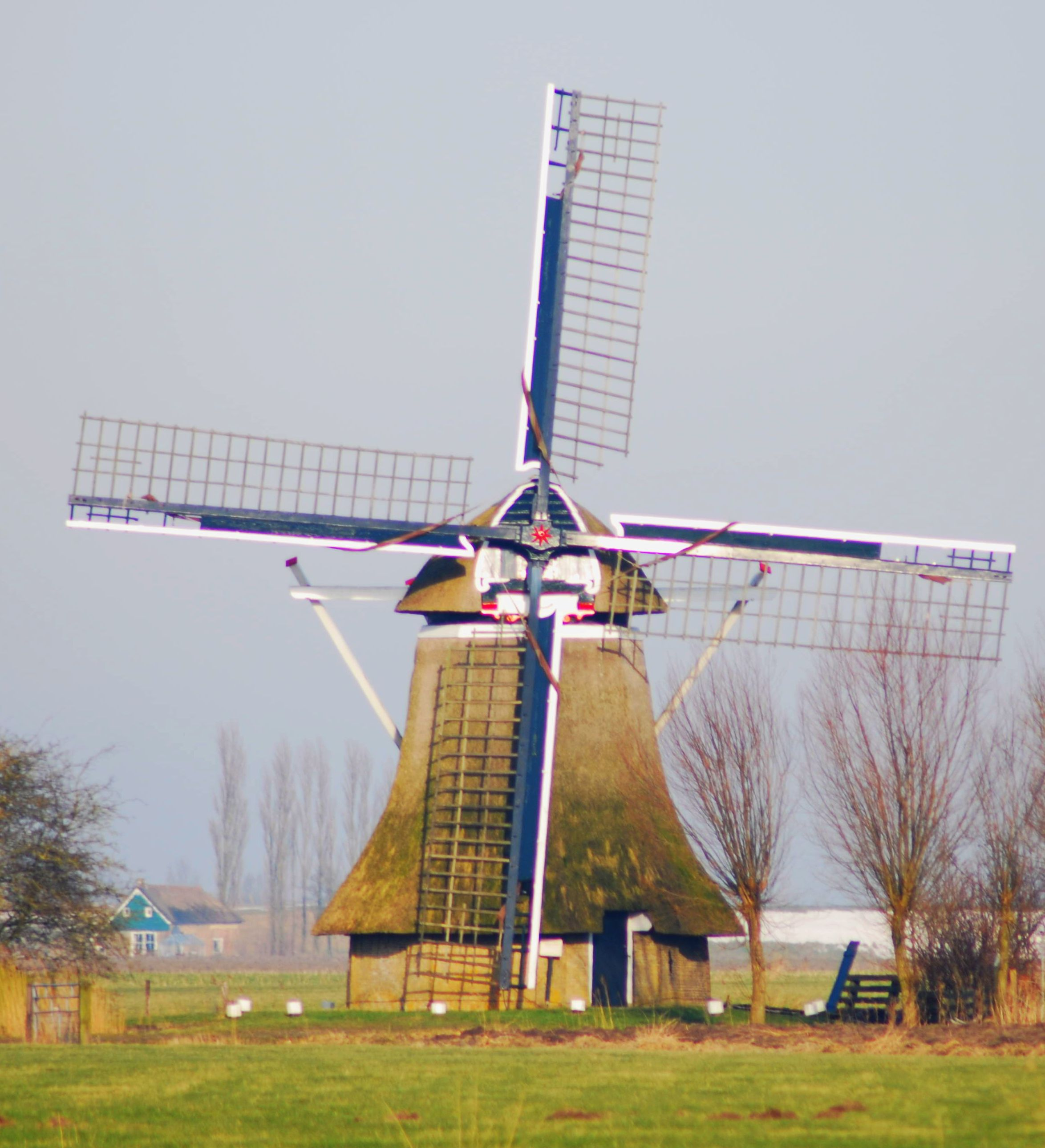
- Westermolen, January 2010.

Origin
- Mill name: De Westermolen
- Mill location: Foijingaweg 55, 9293 LR Kollumerpomp
- Coordinates: 53°18′22″N 6°11′46″E
- Operator(s): Monumentenstichting Kollumerland c.a. en Nieuwkruisland
- Year built: 1845

Information
- Purpose: Drainage mill
- Type: Smock mill
- Storeys: Two-storey smock
- Base storeys: Single-storey base
- No. of sails: Four sails
- Type of sails: Common sails
- Windshaft: Cast iron
- Winding: Tailpole and winch
- Auxiliary power: Electric motor
- Type of pump: Archimedes' screw

De Westermolen is a smock mill in Kollumerpomp, Friesland, Netherlands which was built in 1845. The mill has been restored to working order. It is listed as a Rijksmonument, number 23746.

== History ==
De Westermolen was built in 1845 to drain the 300 hectares (740 acres) Ooster- en Wester- Nieuwkruisland polder. As well as draining the polder, it could also pump water into the polder. The mill worked until 1959, when a stock broke in a storm. Permission was then sought to demolish the mill, but this was refused. On 4 March 1961, the mill was bought by the municipality Kollumerland en Nieuwkruisland for ƒ1. The mill was restored at a cost of ƒ7,500. A diesel engine was placed in the mill to work the Archimedes' screw. A further restoration in 1984 by millwright Thijs Jellema of Burdaard saw the diesel engine replaced by an electric motor. Further work by Jellema in 1987 returned the mill to working order. Ownership of the mill had passed to the Monumentenstichting Kollumerland c.a. en Nieuwkruisland by 1996, when further restoration work was carried out. An electrically driven pump now stands next to the mill.

== Description ==
De Westermolen is what the Dutch describe as a Grondzeiler. It is a two-storey smock mill on a single-storey base. There is no stage, the sails reaching down almost to ground level. The mill is winded by tailpole and winch. The smock and cap are thatched. The sails are Common sails. The sails on the inner stock have a span of 17.81 metres (58 ft 5 in), while those on the outer stock have a span of 17.96 metres (58 ft 11 in). The sails are carried on a cast-iron windshaft which was cast by Prins van Oranje, The Hague, in 1870. The windshaft also carries the brake wheel which has 60 cogs. This drives the wallower (33 cogs) at the top of the upright shaft. At the bottom of the upright shaft is the crown wheel, which has 41 cogs, drives a gearwheel with 42 cogs on the axle of the Archimedes' screw. The axle of the Archimedes' screw is 465 millimetres (1 ft 6 in) diameter. The screw is 1.37 metres (4 ft 6 in) diameter. It is inclined at 16.7°. Each revolution of the screw lifts 969 litres (213 imp gal) of water. The Archimedes' screw that pumped water into the polder has been removed.

== Public access ==
De Westermolen is open on Friday mornings. It is also open on Saturday mornings if there is enough wind to work the mill.
