= Jirnsum =

- Village
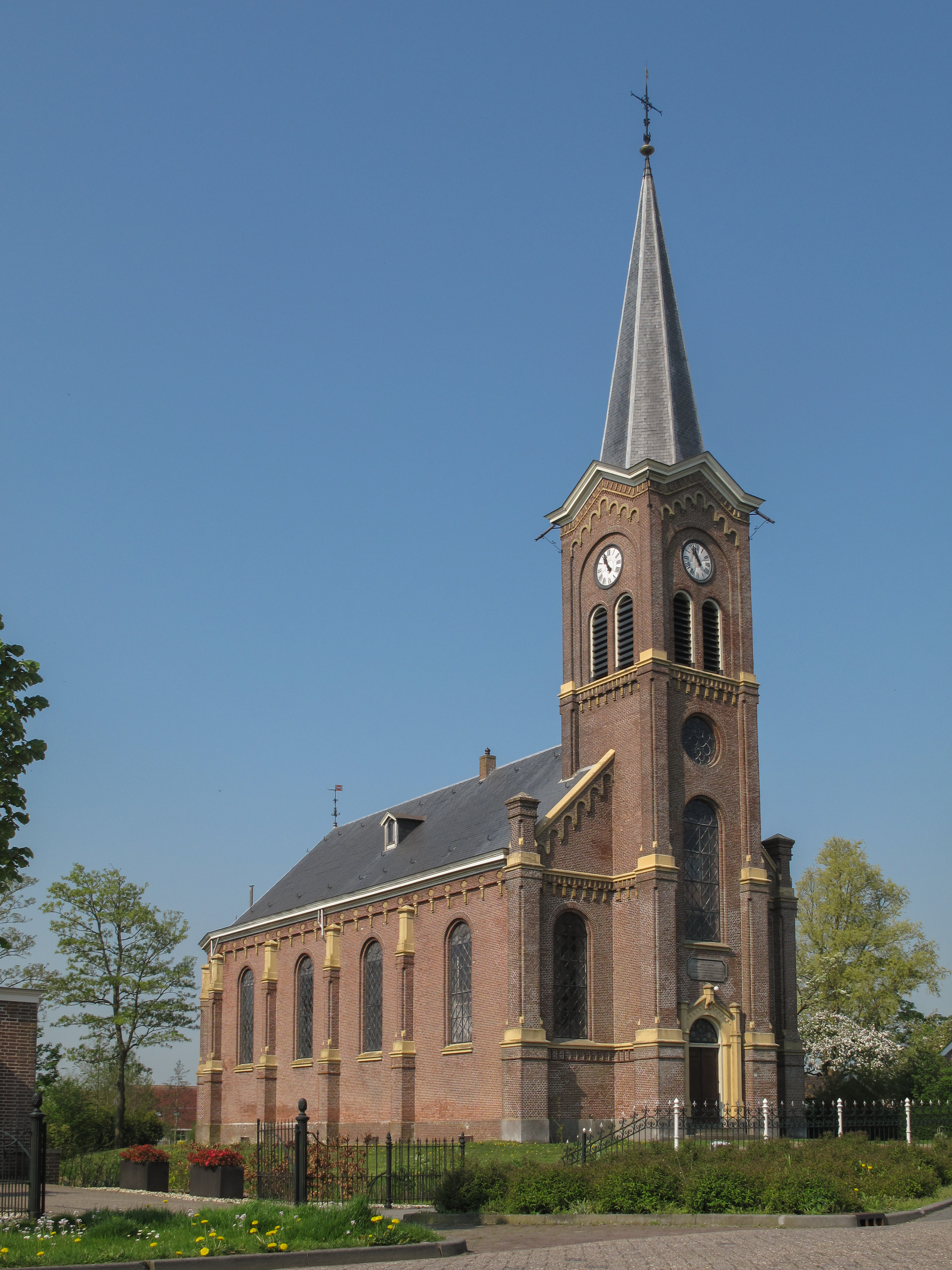
- Jirnsum Church

- Flag Coat of arms

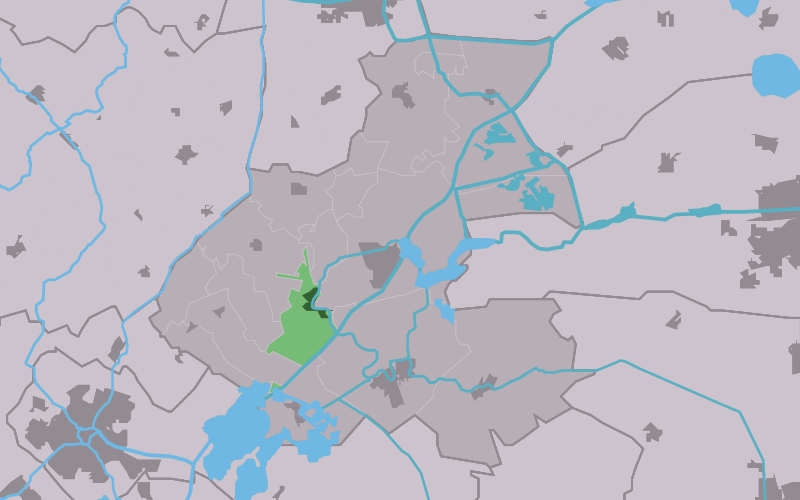
- Location in the former Boarnsterhim municipality

- Location in the Netherlands
- Country: Netherlands
- Province: Friesland
- Municipality: Leeuwarden

Area
  - Total: 10.11 km^{2} (3.90 sq mi)
- Elevation: 0.4 m (1.3 ft)

Population (2021)
  - Total: 1,360
  - Density: 135/km^{2} (348/sq mi)
- Time zone: UTC+1 (CET)
  - Summer (DST): UTC+2 (CEST)
- Postal code: 9011
- Dialing code: 0566

Jirnsum (Dutch: Irnsum) is a village in Leeuwarden municipality in the province of Friesland, the Netherlands. It had a population of around 1,360 in January 2017.

== History ==
The village was first mentioned between 1399 and 1401 as Yrntzom, and means "settlement of the people of Irin". Jirnsum developed as a terp (artificial living mound) living along the Boorne river. Later, it became a road village. The Dutch Reformed church dates from 1877. The Mennonite church dates from 1684 and received its current form in 1866. In 1840, Jirnsum was home to 525 people. In 1868, the Grou-Jirnsum railway station opened.

Before 2014, Jirnsum was part of Boarnsterhim municipality and before 1984 it belonged to Rauwerdhem.

== Notable people ==
- Martijn Theodoor Houtsma (1851–1943), orientalist and professor.

== Gallery ==
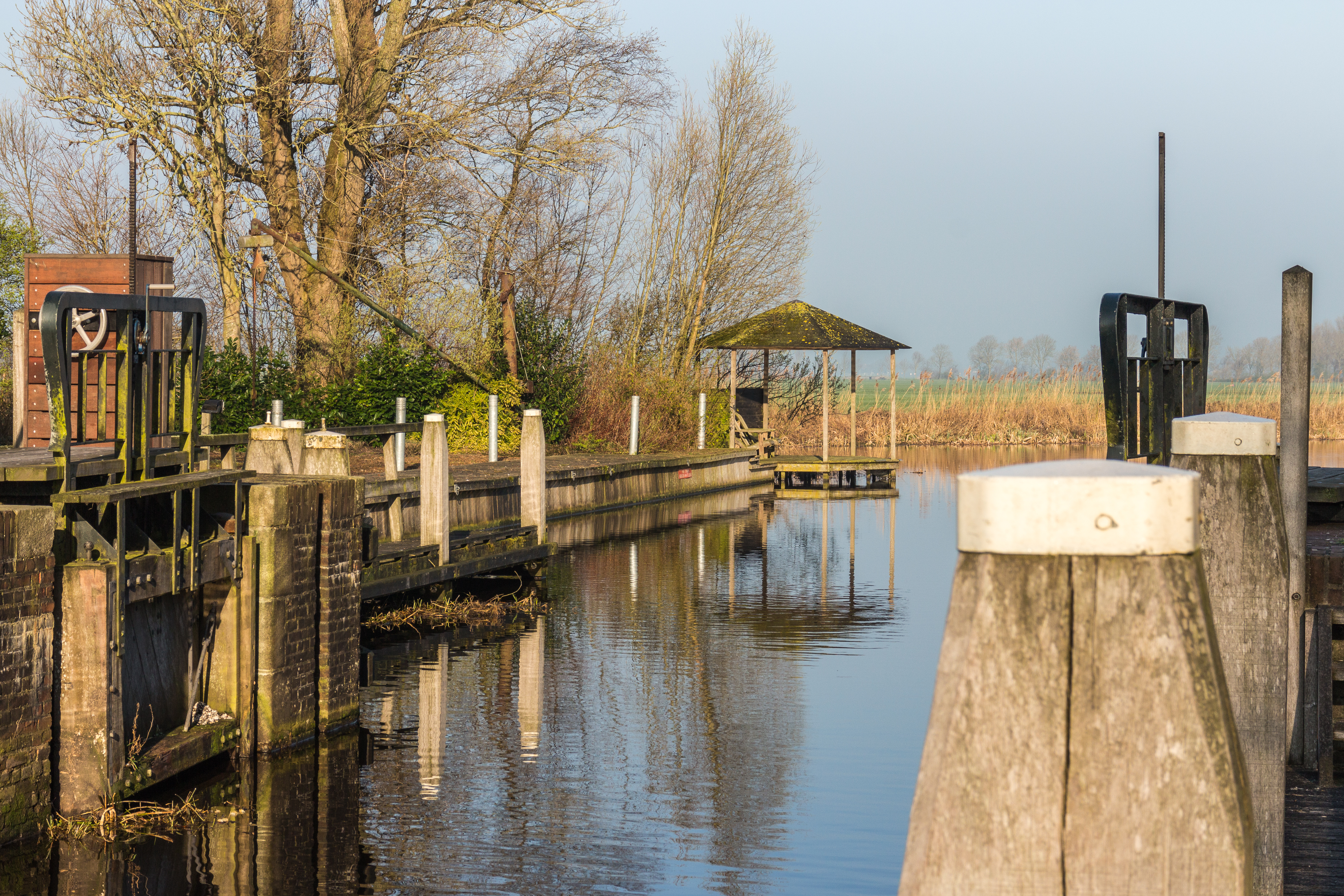
Sluice at the Dille River

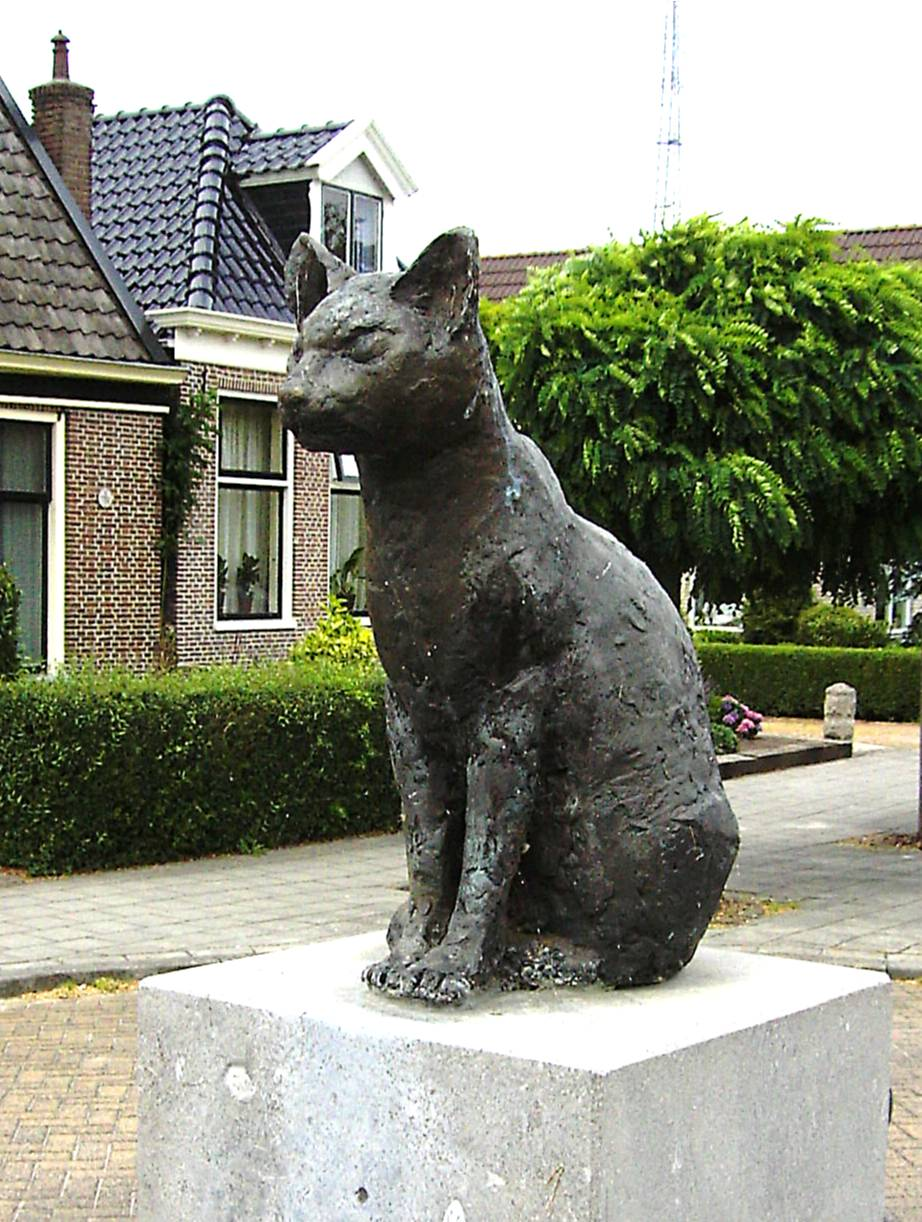
Cat statue

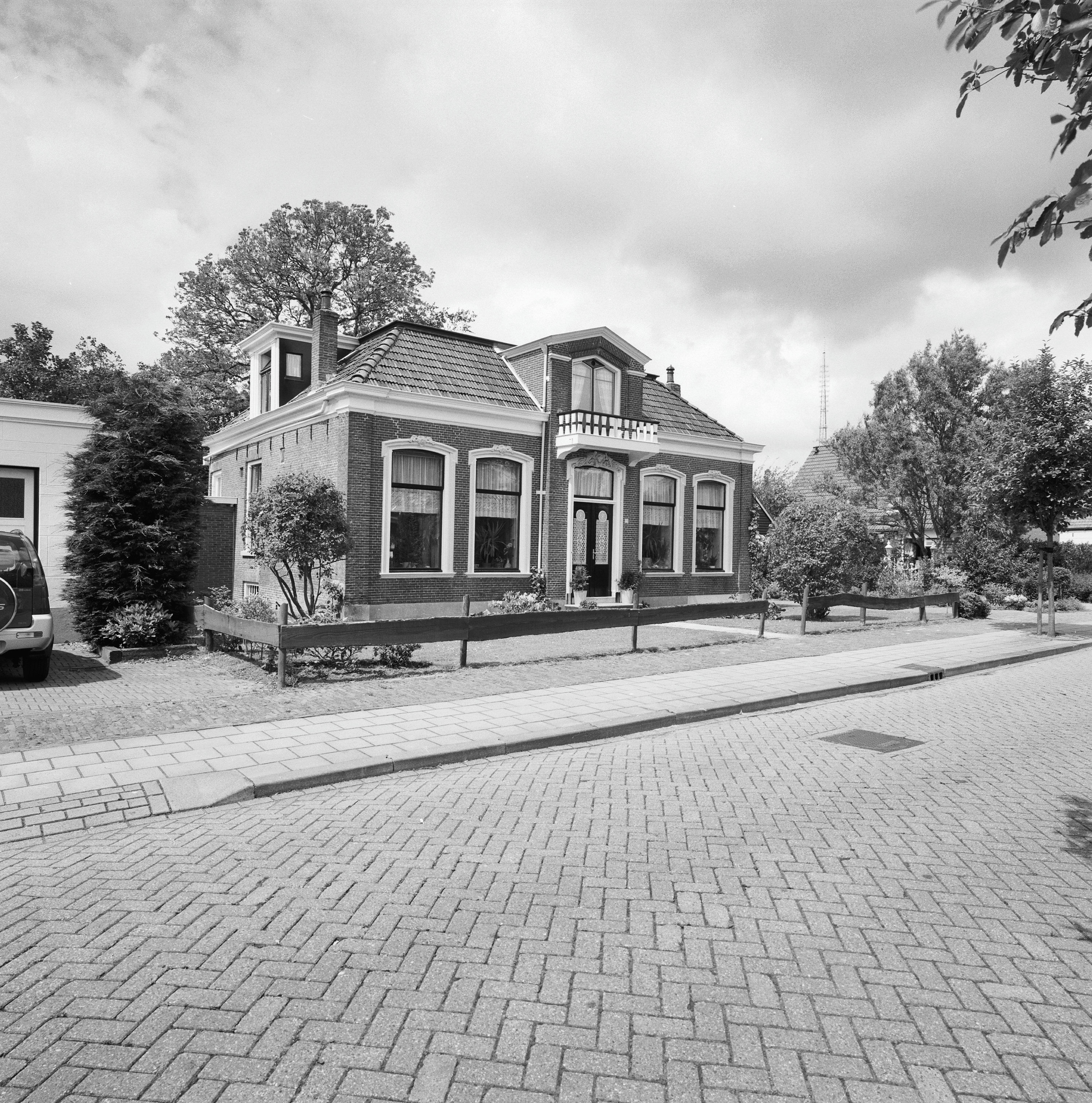
House in Jirnsum

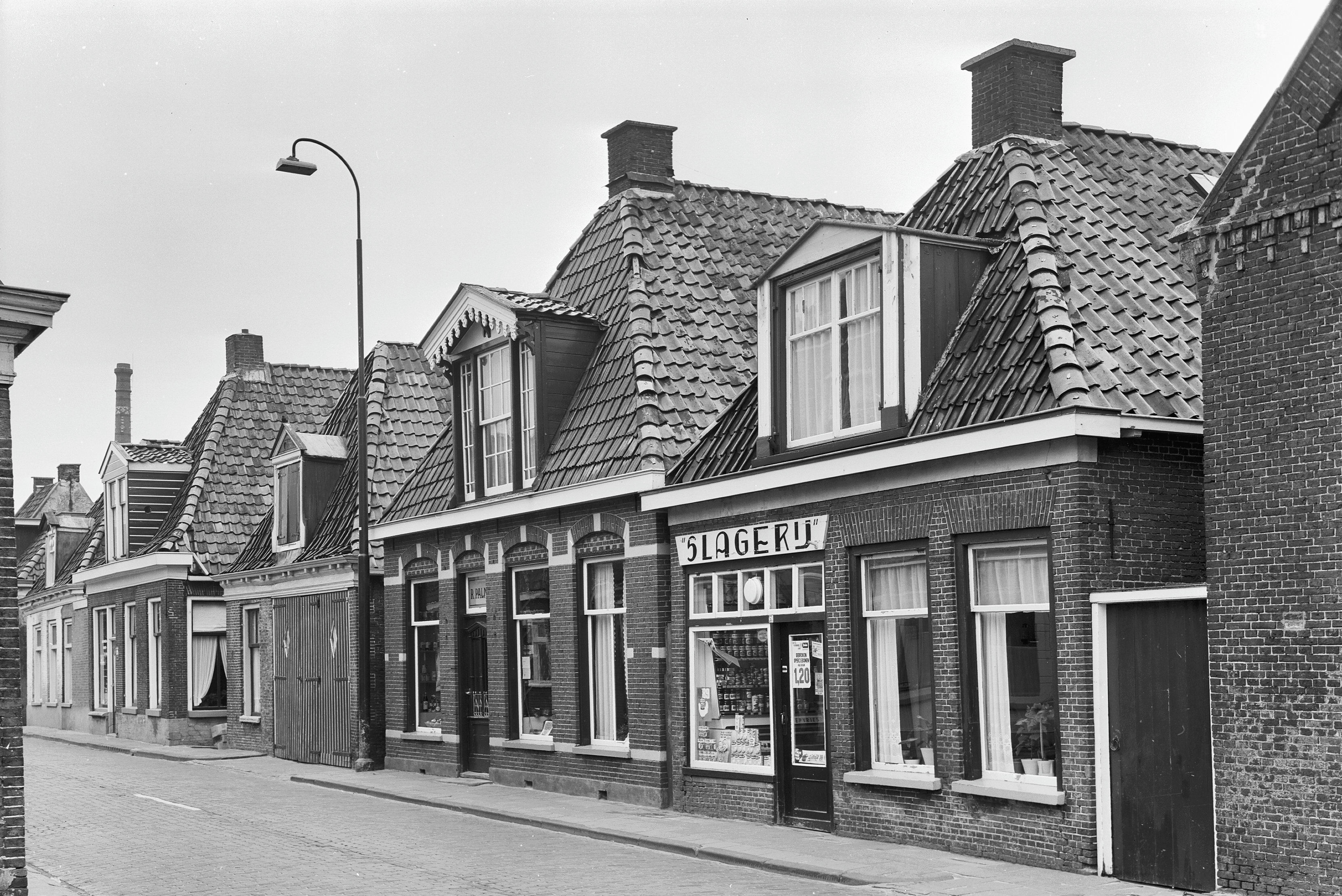
Streets or Jirnsum (1968)
