= Jislum =

- Village
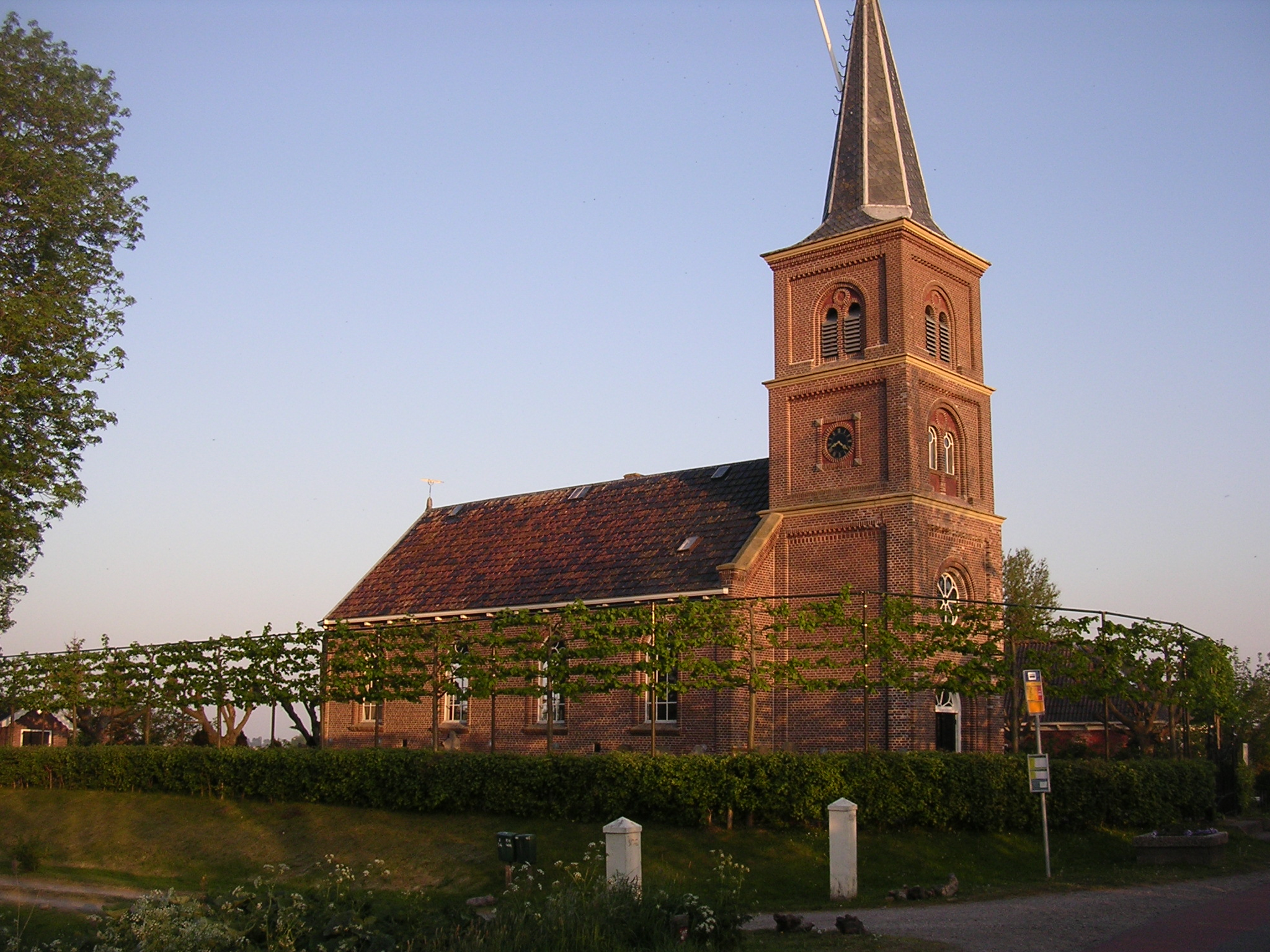
- St Catherine's church

- Flag

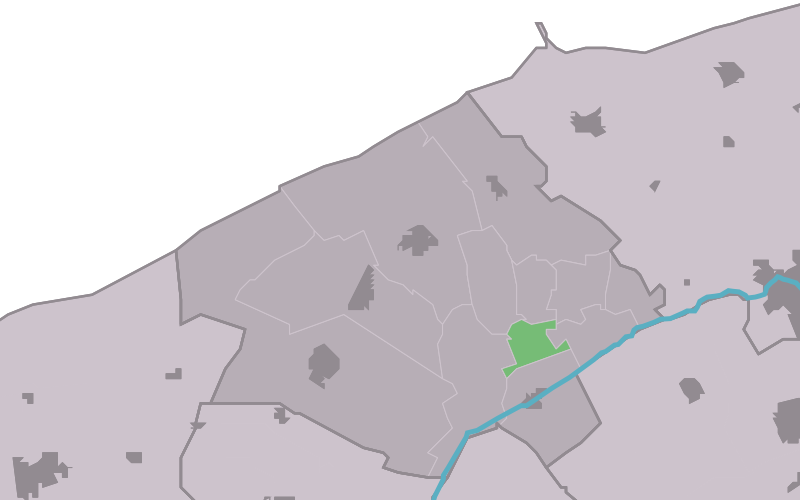
- Location in the former Ferwerderadiel municipality

- Location in the Netherlands Jislum (Netherlands)
- Country: Netherlands
- Province: Friesland
- Municipality: Noardeast-Fryslân

Area
  - Total: 1.67 km^{2} (0.64 sq mi)
- Elevation: 0.5 m (1.6 ft)

Population (2021)
  - Total: 65
  - Density: 39/km^{2} (100/sq mi)
- Time zone: UTC+1 (CET)
  - Summer (DST): UTC+2 (CEST)
- Postal code: 9177
- Dialing code: 0519

Jislum is a village in Noardeast-Fryslân in the province of Friesland, the Netherlands. It had a population of around 65 in January 2017. Before 2019, the village was part of the Ferwerderadiel municipality.

There is a restored windmill in the village called De Volharding.

== History ==
The village was first mentioned in 944 as Gisleheim and means "settlement of the people of Gisilo". In 1840, Jislum was home to 118 people. The Dutch Reformed church dates from 1886 and is a replacement of a medieval church. The polder mill De Volharding was built in 1872. It was in service until 1955. In 1994, it was restored and since 2006, it performs as a backup to the pumping station.

== Gallery ==
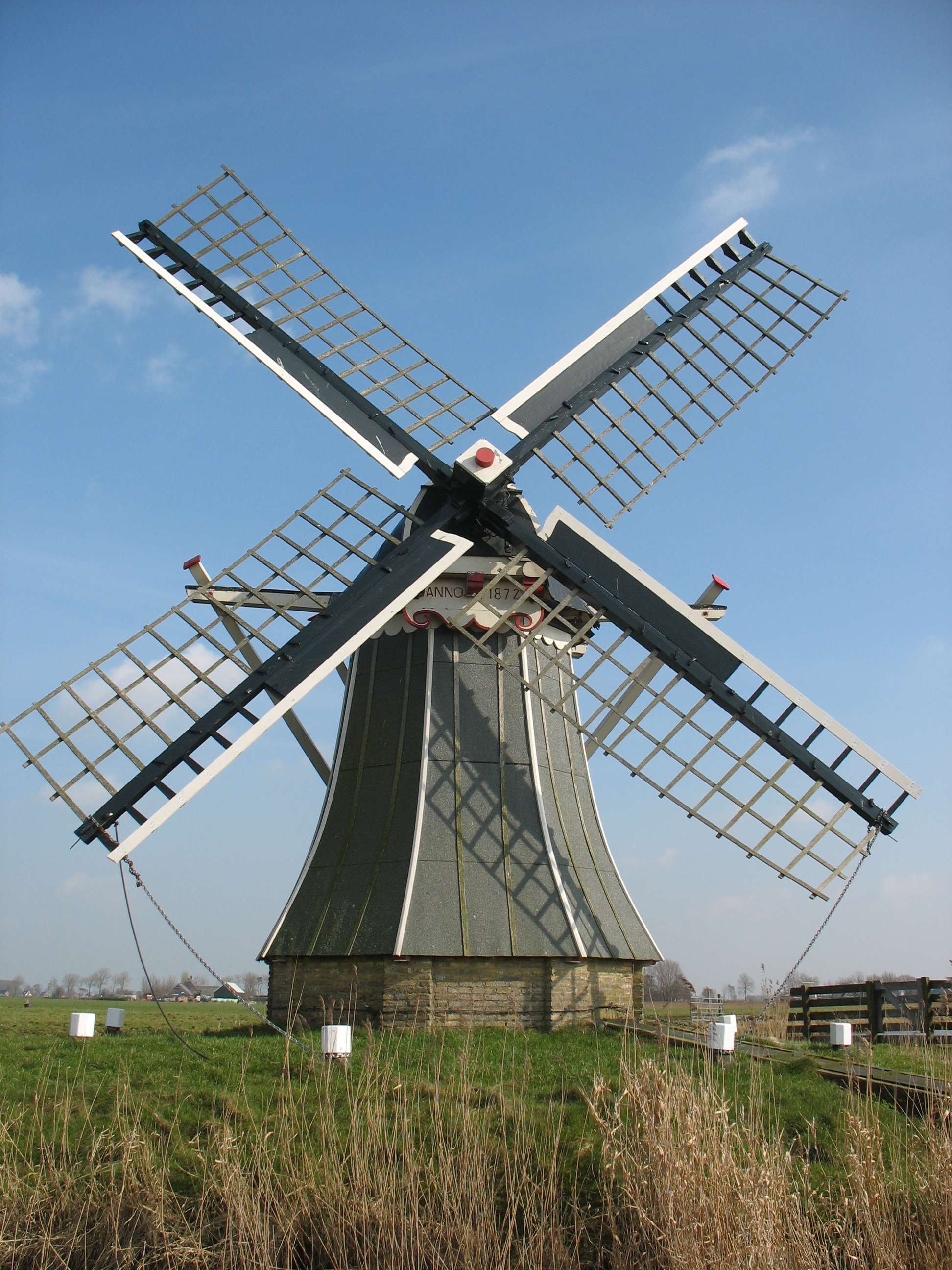
Windmill De Volharding

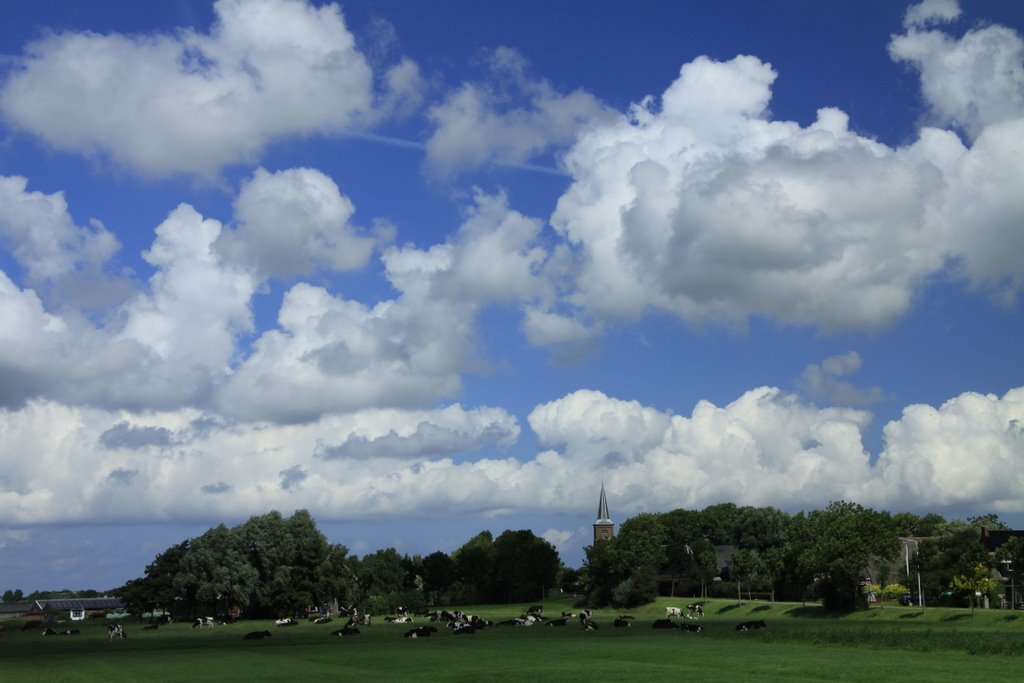
Landscape near Jislum

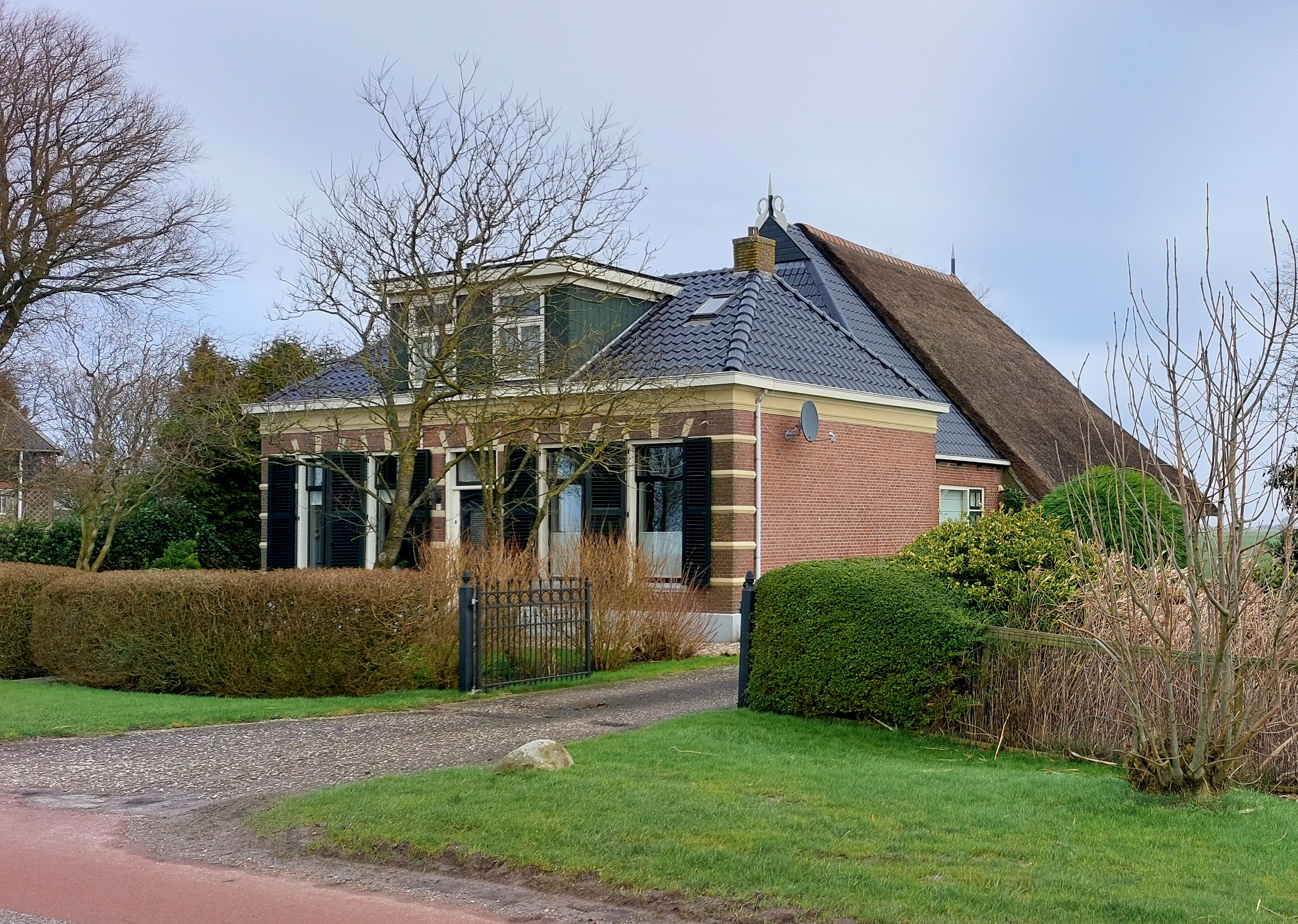
Farm in Jislum
