= De Volharding, Jislum =

Smock mill in Jislum, Friesland, Netherlands

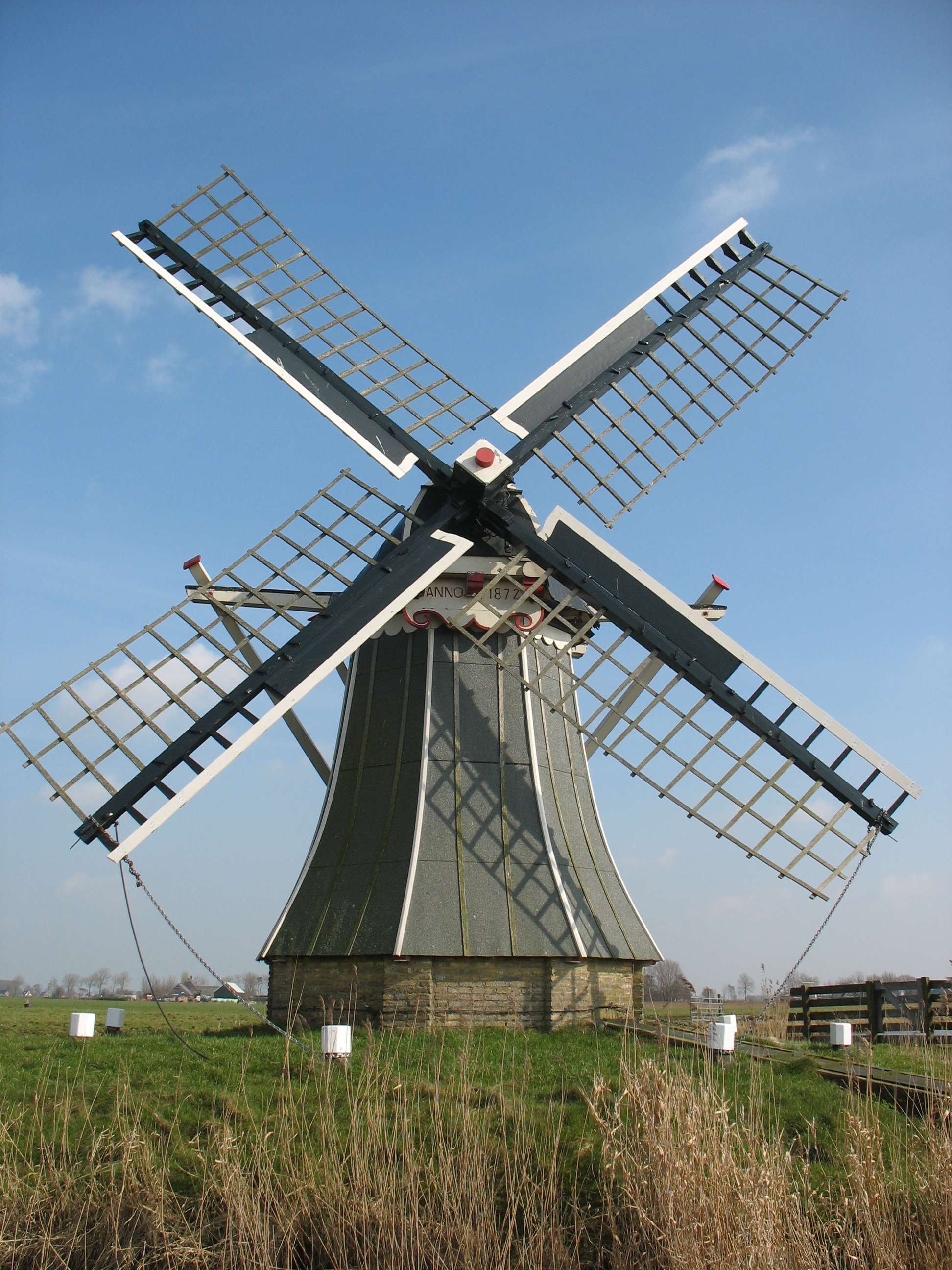
- De Volharding, March 2007

Origin
- Mill name: De Volharding
- Mill location: Bij Hikkaarderdyk 25, 9177 GA Jislum
- Coordinates: 53°18′41″N 5°52′12″E
- Operator(s): Stichting De Fryske Mole
- Year built: 1872

Information
- Purpose: Drainage mill
- Type: Smock mill
- Storeys: Two-storey smock
- Base storeys: Low base, about 500 millimetres (20 in) high
- Smock sides: Eight sides
- No. of sails: Four sails
- Type of sails: Common sails
- Windshaft: Wood
- Winding: Tailpole and winch
- Type of pump: Archimedes' screw

De Volharding (English: The Perseverance) is a smock mill in Jislum, Friesland, Netherlands which was built in 1872. The mill has been restored to working order and designated as being held in reserve in times of emergency. It is listed as a Rijksmonument, number 15632.

== History ==
De Volharding was built in 1872. It drained the Ald Piip Polder, which has an area of 50 hectares (120 acres). The mill can pump water into the polder as well as draining water from the polder. The mill worked until 1955, after which it became derelict. On 28 December 1971, it was the first mill bought by Stichting De Fryske Mole (English: Frisian Mills Foundation). The mill was restored by millwright Tacoma of Stiens in 1973. A further restoration was undertaken in 1994. In 2000, a new Archimedes' screw was fitted by millwright H Kloosterman. In 2006, the mill was officially designated by Wetterskap Fryslân as being held in reserve for use in times of emergency.

== Description ==
De Volharding is what the Dutch describe as an grondzeiler. It is a two-storey smock mill on a low brick base. There is no stage, the sails reaching almost to the ground. The mill is winded by tailpole and winch. The smock and cap are covered in vertical boards. The sails are Common sails. They have a span of 9.20 metres (30 ft 2 in). The sails are carried on a wooden windshaft. The windshaft also carries the brake wheel which has 32 cogs. This drives the wallower (17 cogs) at the top of the upright shaft. At the bottom of the upright shaft, the crown wheel, which has 28 cogs drives a gearwheel with 25 cogs on the axle of the Archimedes' screw. The axle of the Archimedes' screw is 240 millimetres (9 in) diameter. The screw is 710 millimetres (2 ft 4 in) diameter and 3.45 metres (11 ft 4 in) long. It is inclined at 19°. Each revolution of the screw lifts 900 litres (200 imp gal) of water.

== Public access ==
De Volharding is open by appointment.
