= Jutrijp =

Jutrijp Jutryp
- Village
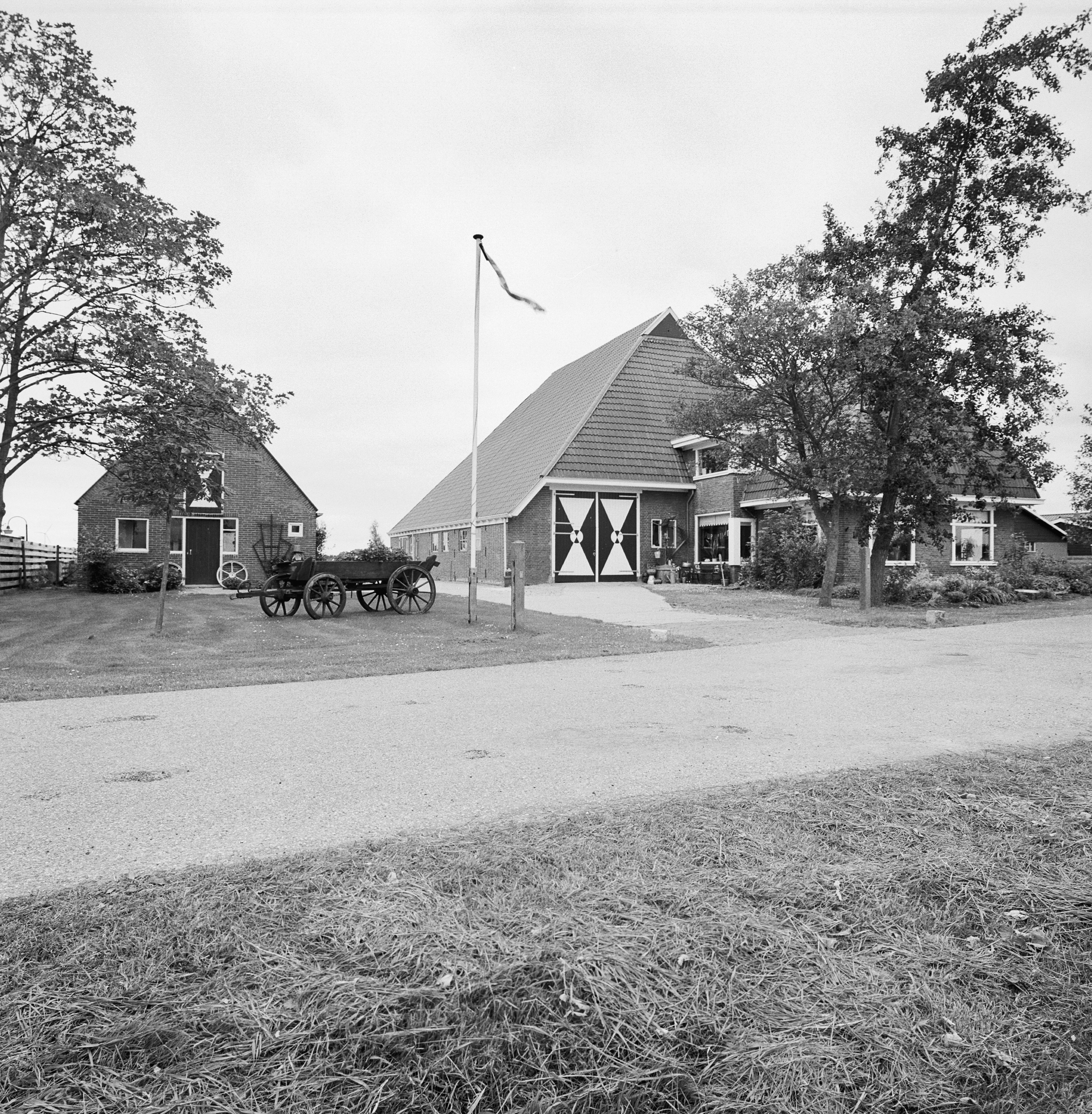
- Farm in Jutrijp

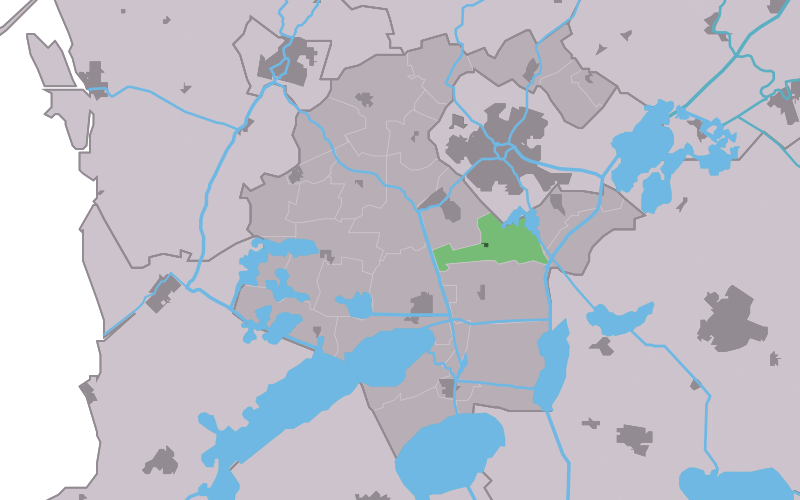
- Location in the former Wymbritseradiel municipality

- Location in the Netherlands Jutrijp (Netherlands)
- Country: Netherlands
- Province: Friesland
- Municipality: Súdwest-Fryslân

Area
  - Total: 6.08 km^{2} (2.35 sq mi)
- Elevation: −0.7 m (−2.3 ft)

Population (2021)
  - Total: 275
  - Density: 45.2/km^{2} (117/sq mi)
- Time zone: UTC+1 (CET)
  - Summer (DST): UTC+2 (CEST)
- Postal code: 8623
- Dialing code: 0515

Jutrijp (West Frisian: Jutryp) is a village in Súdwest-Fryslân in the province of Friesland, the Netherlands. It had a population of around 265 in January 2017.

It forms, together with Hommerts, the double village De Hommerts-Jutryp.

== History ==
The village was first mentioned in 1482 as Ryp, and means either "river bank of Jort" or "hole in the river bank". Jutrijp is a linear settlement which developed to the south of Sneek in the late middle ages. In 1843, the road from Sneek to Lemmer was built, and the village developed towards the road and became attached to Hommerts.

The medieval church was replaced in 1876 by a new church with tower. The old tower remained standing until the middle of the 19th century. The church was demolished in the early 1970s.

Jutrijp was home to 161 people in 1840. Before 2011, the village was part of the Wymbritseradiel municipality.
