= De Groene Molen, Joure =

Post mill in Friesland, Netherlands

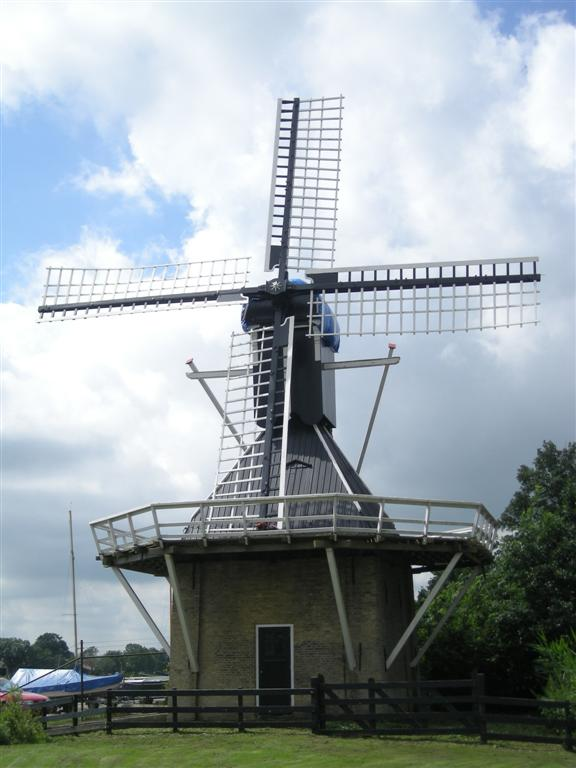
- De Groene Molen, July 2007, note the buck roof covered by a tarpaulin following storm damage.

Origin
- Mill name: De Groene Molen
- Mill location: Groene Dijk 7, 8501 AX Joure
- Coordinates: 52.9736°N 5.7864°E
- Operator(s): Gemeente Skarsterlân
- Year built: c1800

Information
- Purpose: Drainage mill
- Type: Hollow post mill
- Base storeys: Single storey base
- Roundhouse storeys: Single storey roundhouse
- No. of sails: Four sails
- Type of sails: Common sails
- Windshaft: Cast iron
- Winding: Tailpole and winch
- Auxiliary power: Diesel engine
- Type of pump: Archimedes' screw

De Groene Molen (English: The Green Mill) is a hollow post mill in Joure, Friesland, Netherlands which was built c. 1800. The mill has been restored so that it can turn by wind. It is listed as a Rijksmonument, number 18208.

== History ==
De Groene Molen was built c1800. It drained the 19 hectares (47 acres) Bleeker polder. In 1937, a 6 horsepower (4.5 kW) Lister diesel engine was installed. On 18 December 1956, the mill was bought by the Gemeente Haskerland. In 1992, the mill was restored by millwright Westra of Franeker. A new buck and sails were fitted.

On 18 January 2007, the mill was severely damaged in a storm, with parts of the roof of the buck being blown off. The mill was dismantled on 12 December 2008 and restored by millwrights Boubedrijf Hiemstra BV, Tzummarum. On 13 May 2009, the renewed roundhouse, buck and sails were re-erected on the base.

== Description ==
De Groene Molen is what the Dutch describe as an Spinnenkop met Stelling. It is a hollow post mill with a roundhouse on a single storey base. The stage is at first floor level 4.20 metres (13 ft 9 in) above ground level. The mill is winded by tailpole and winch. The buck and roof are covered in horizontal boards. The sails are common sails. They have a span of 13.10 metres (43 ft 0 in). The sails are carried on a wooden windshaft. The windshaft also carries the brake wheel which has 39 cogs. This drives the wallower (19 cogs) at the top of the upright shaft. At the bottom of the upright shaft is the crown wheel (see photo of engine below). Since the last restoration the Archimedes' screw can be driven by either the Lister engine or by wind power. The crown wheel at the bottom of the upright shaft drives a layshaft which is connected by belt to a second layshaft. The driving gear on the end of this layshaft has 16 teeth; it drives a gear with 64 teeth on the axle of the Archimedes' screw, which is inclined at 19°. A second belt is used to drive this layshaft by the Lister engine.

== Public access ==
De Groene Molen is open by appointment.
