= Rien, Netherlands =

Rien
- Village
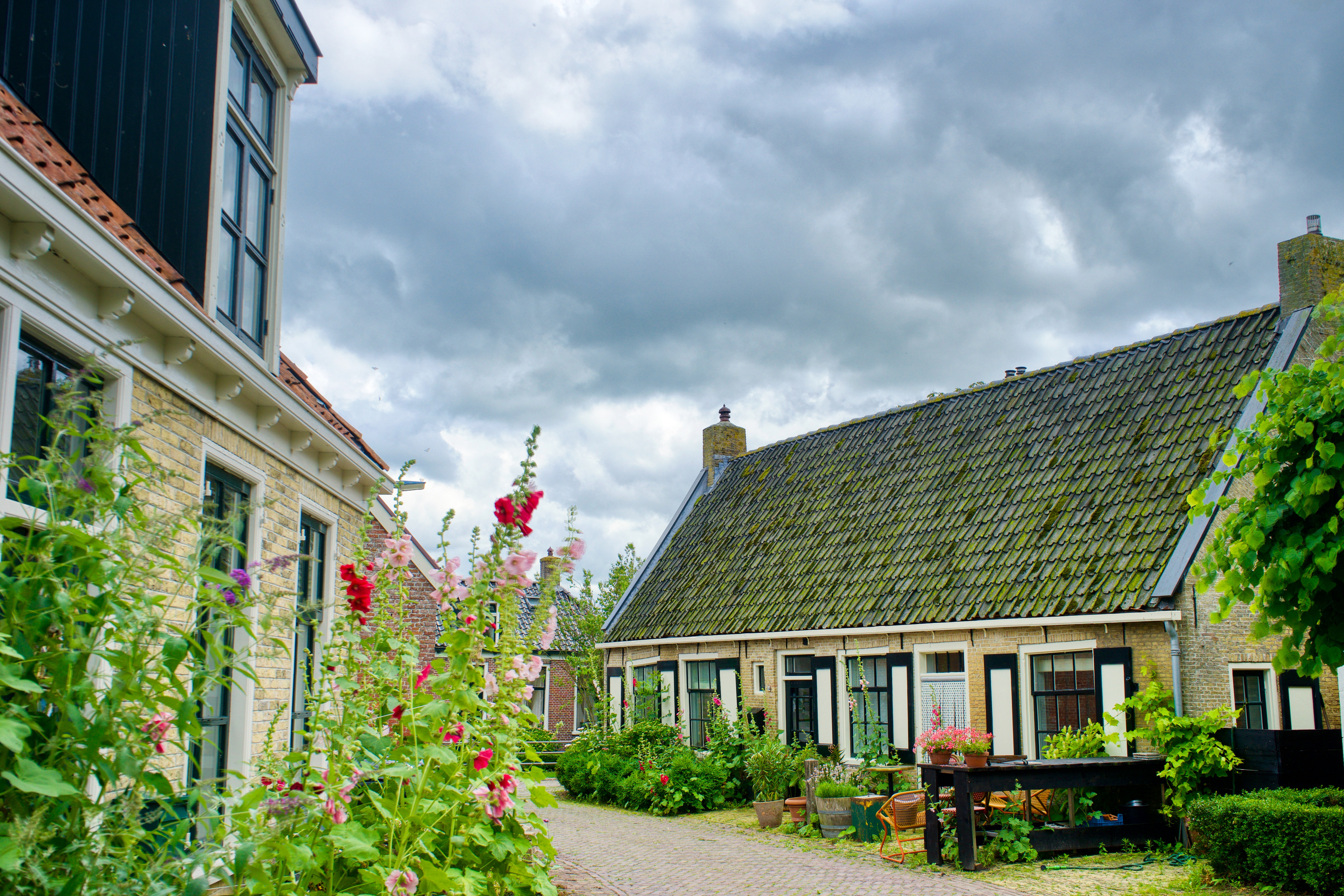

- Flag Coat of arms

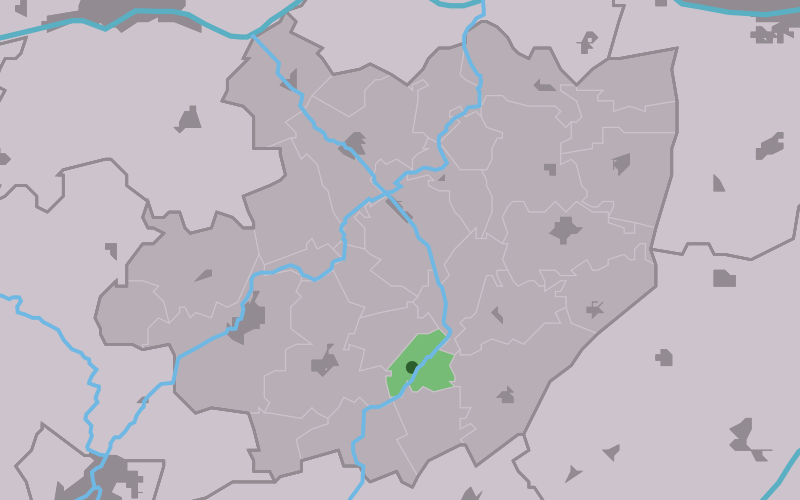
- Location in the former Littenseradiel municipality

- Location in the Netherlands Rien (Netherlands)
- Country: Netherlands
- Province: Friesland
- Municipality: Súdwest-Fryslân

Area
  - Total: 2.28 km^{2} (0.88 sq mi)
- Elevation: 0.1 m (0.33 ft)

Population (2021)
  - Total: 100
  - Density: 44/km^{2} (110/sq mi)
- Time zone: UTC+1 (CET)
  - Summer (DST): UTC+2 (CEST)
- Postal code: 8641
- Dialing code: 0515

Rien is a village in Súdwest-Fryslân municipality in the province of Friesland, the Netherlands. It had a population of around 110 in January 2017.

== History ==
The village was first mentioned in 1527 as Reensterzyl, and means "water border". Rien started as a satellite of Lytsewierrum near a sluice.

Rien was home to 321 people in 1840. It was award village status in 1954. Before 2018, the village was part of the Littenseradiel municipality and before 1984 it belonged to Hennaarderadeel municipality.

== Gallery ==
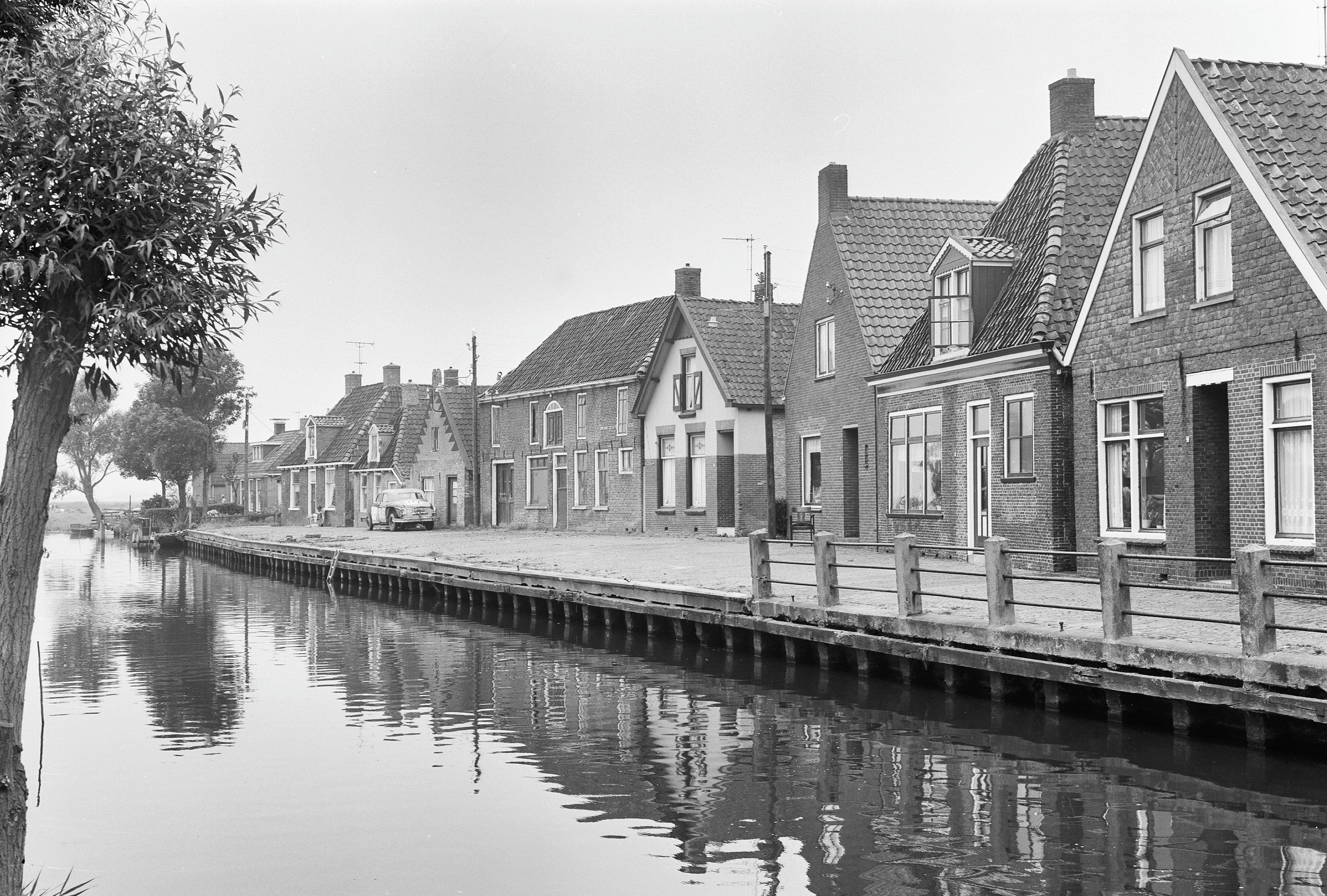
Houses in Rien

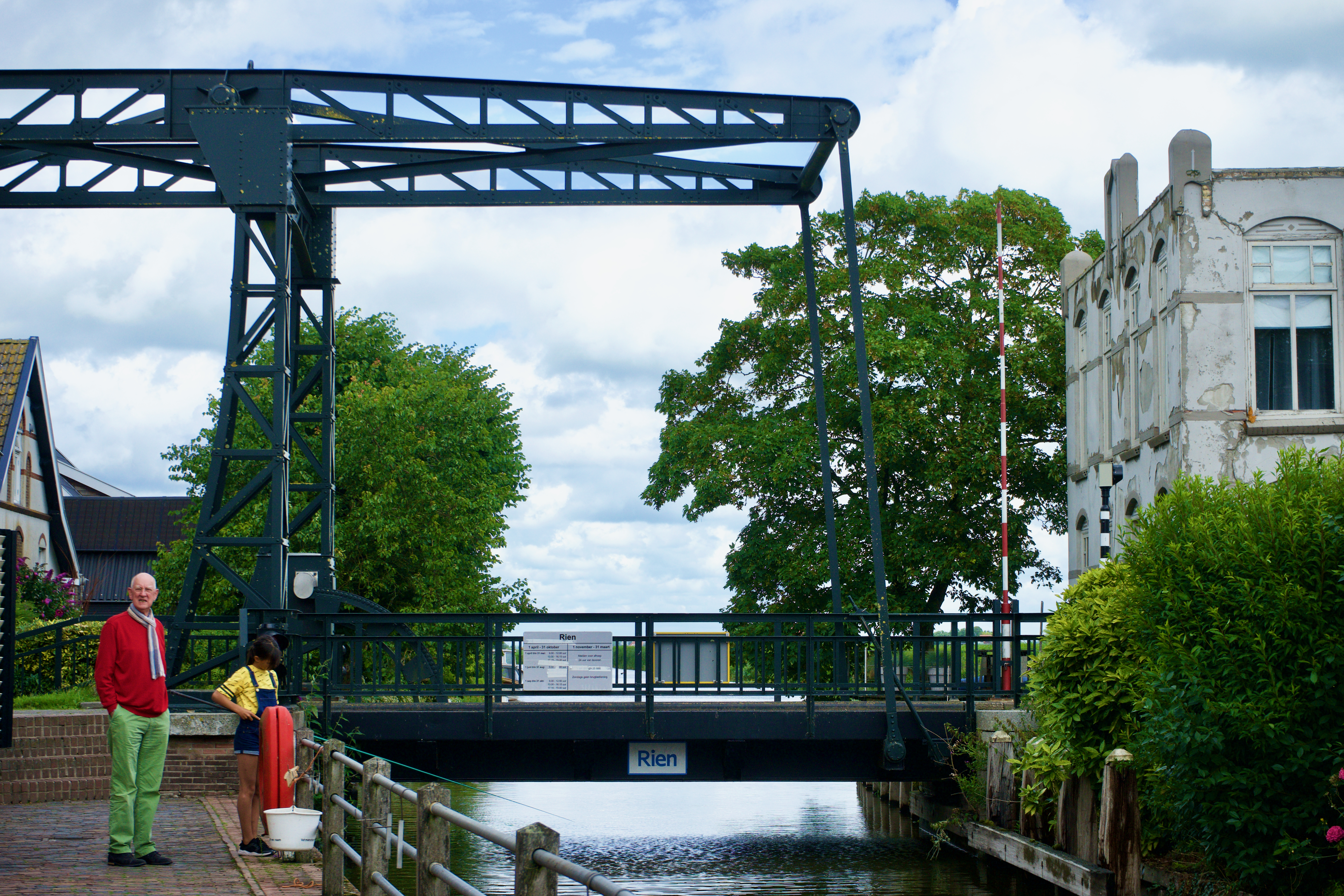
Draw bridge

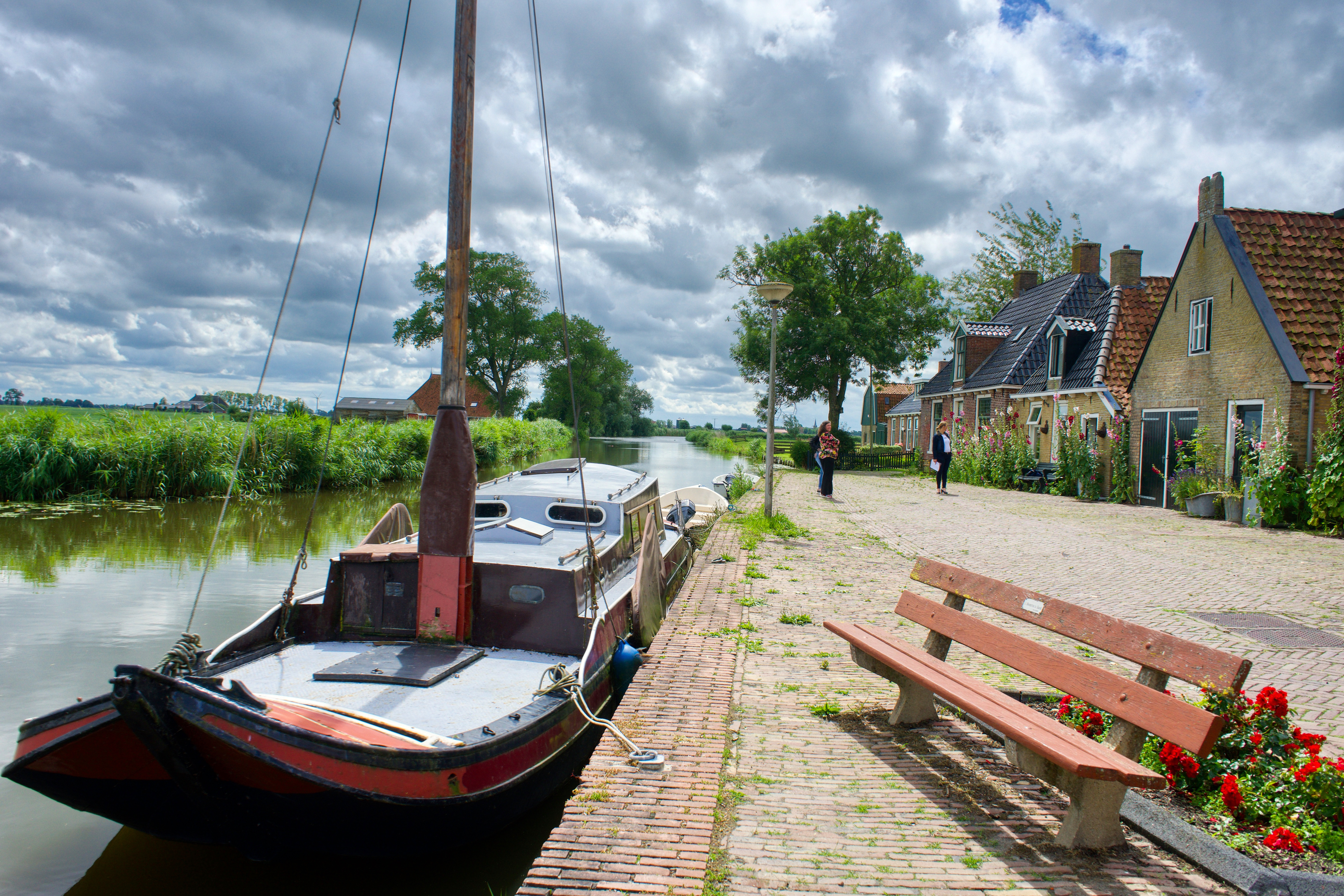
Canal of Rien
