= Spannum =

- Village
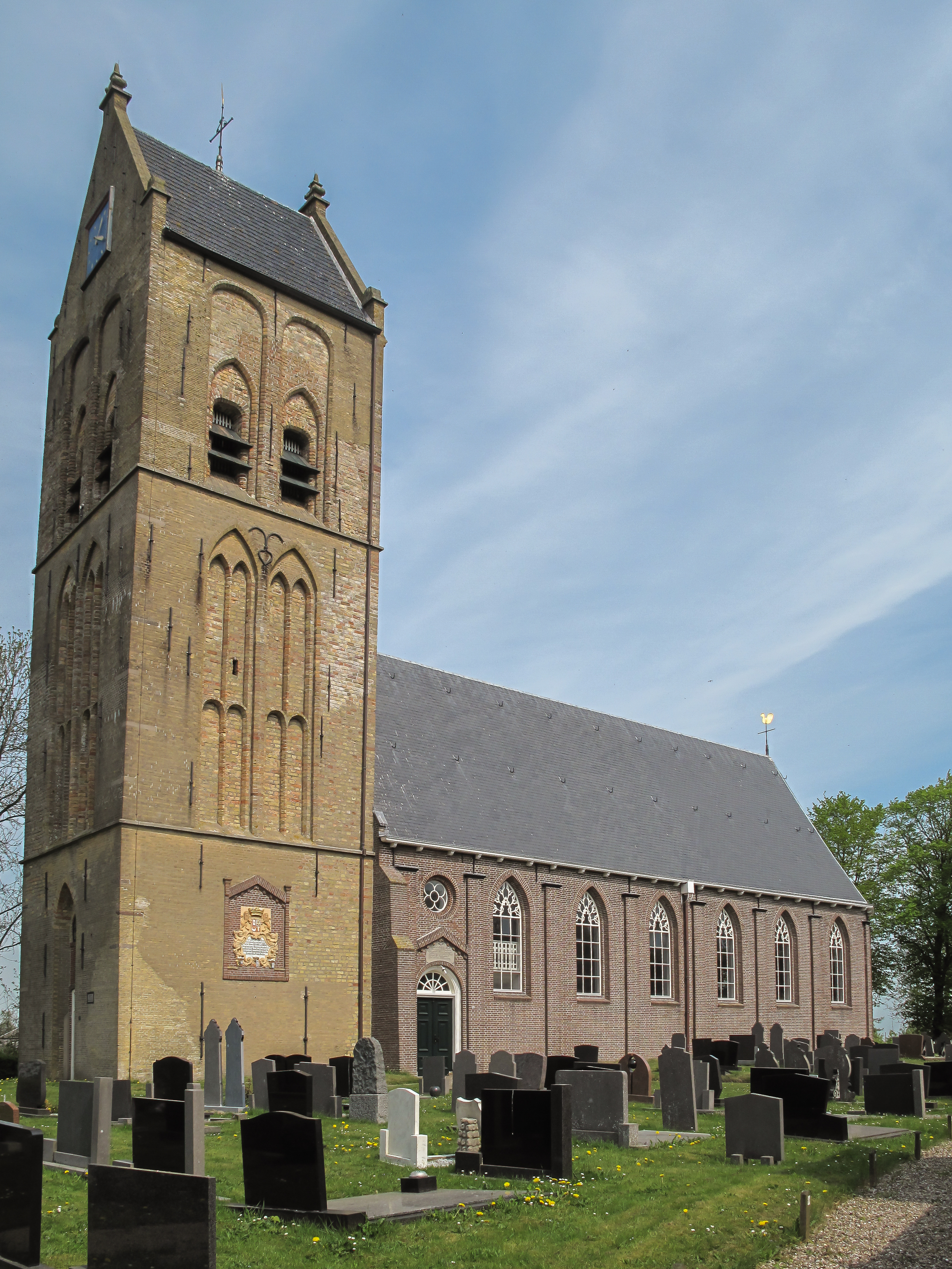
- Spannum church

- Coat of arms

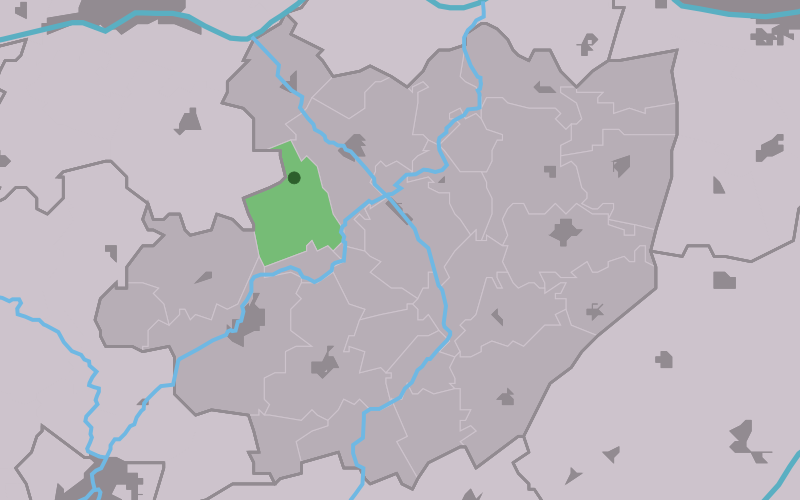
- Location in the former Littenseradiel municipality

- Location in the Netherlands Spannum (Netherlands)
- Country: Netherlands
- Province: Friesland
- Municipality: Waadhoeke

Area
  - Total: 3.33 km^{2} (1.29 sq mi)
- Elevation: 0.4 m (1.3 ft)

Population (2021)
  - Total: 255
  - Density: 76.6/km^{2} (198/sq mi)
- Time zone: UTC+1 (CET)
  - Summer (DST): UTC+2 (CEST)
- Postal code: 8843
- Dialing code: 0517

Spannum (Dutch pronunciation: [ˈspɑnʏm]) is a village in Waadhoeke municipality in the province of Friesland, the Netherlands. It had a population of around 282 in January 2017.

== History ==
The village was first mentioned in the 13th century as Spannum. The etymology is unclear. In 1332, an outpost of the monastery Lidlum of Oosterbierum was located in the Spannum. The Dutch Reformed church was restored in 1743 and enlarged in the late-19th century.

Spannum was home to 177 people in 1840. It used to be an isolated village. In 1875, the road to Wommels opened. In 1876, a boarding school for girls opened in Spannum which an emphasis on learning French. The older girls were only allowed to speak French. The school closed in 1905.

Until 2018, the village was part of the Littenseradiel municipality and until 1984 it belonged to Hennaarderadeel municipality.

== Gallery ==
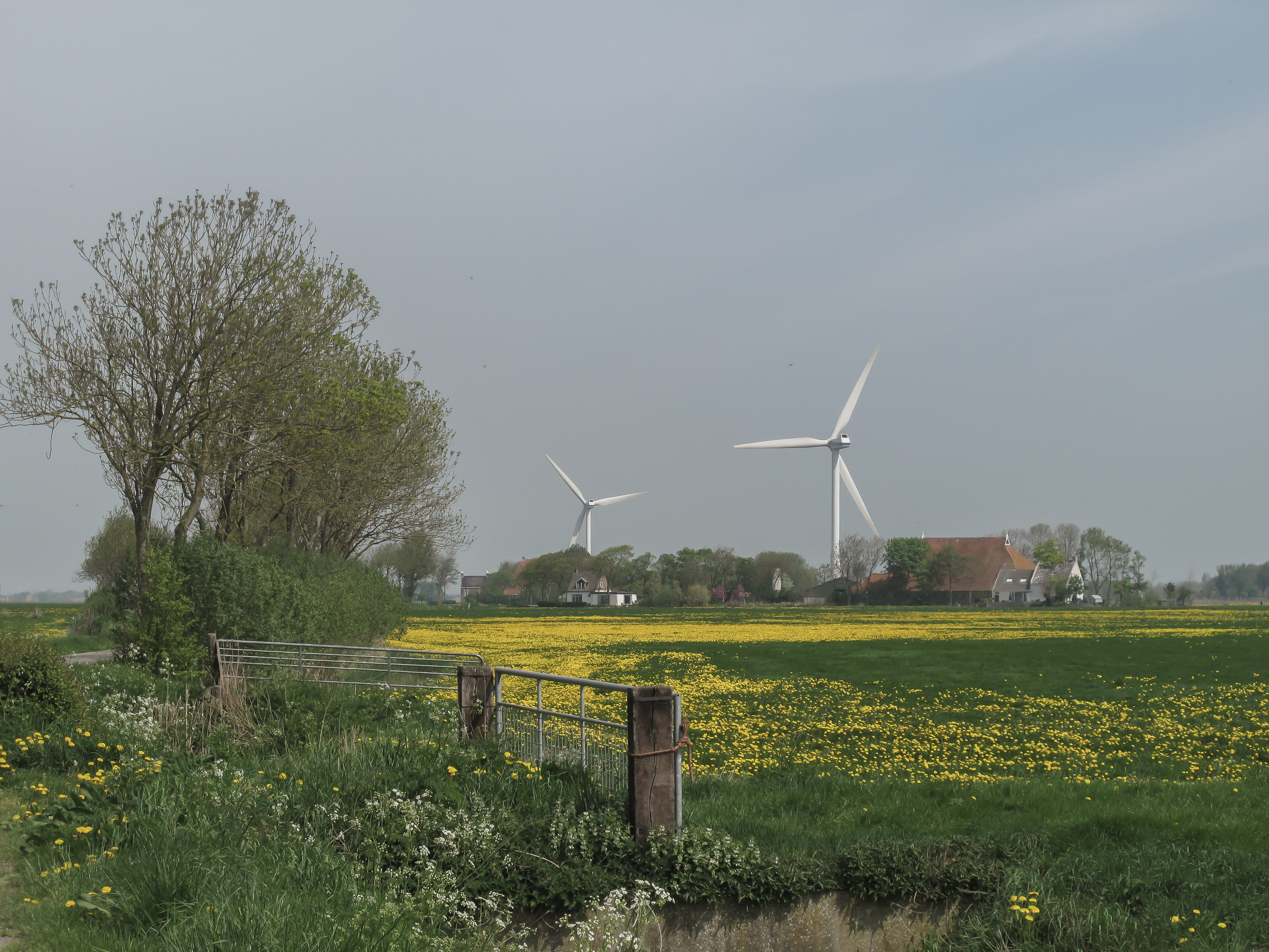
Landscape around Spannum

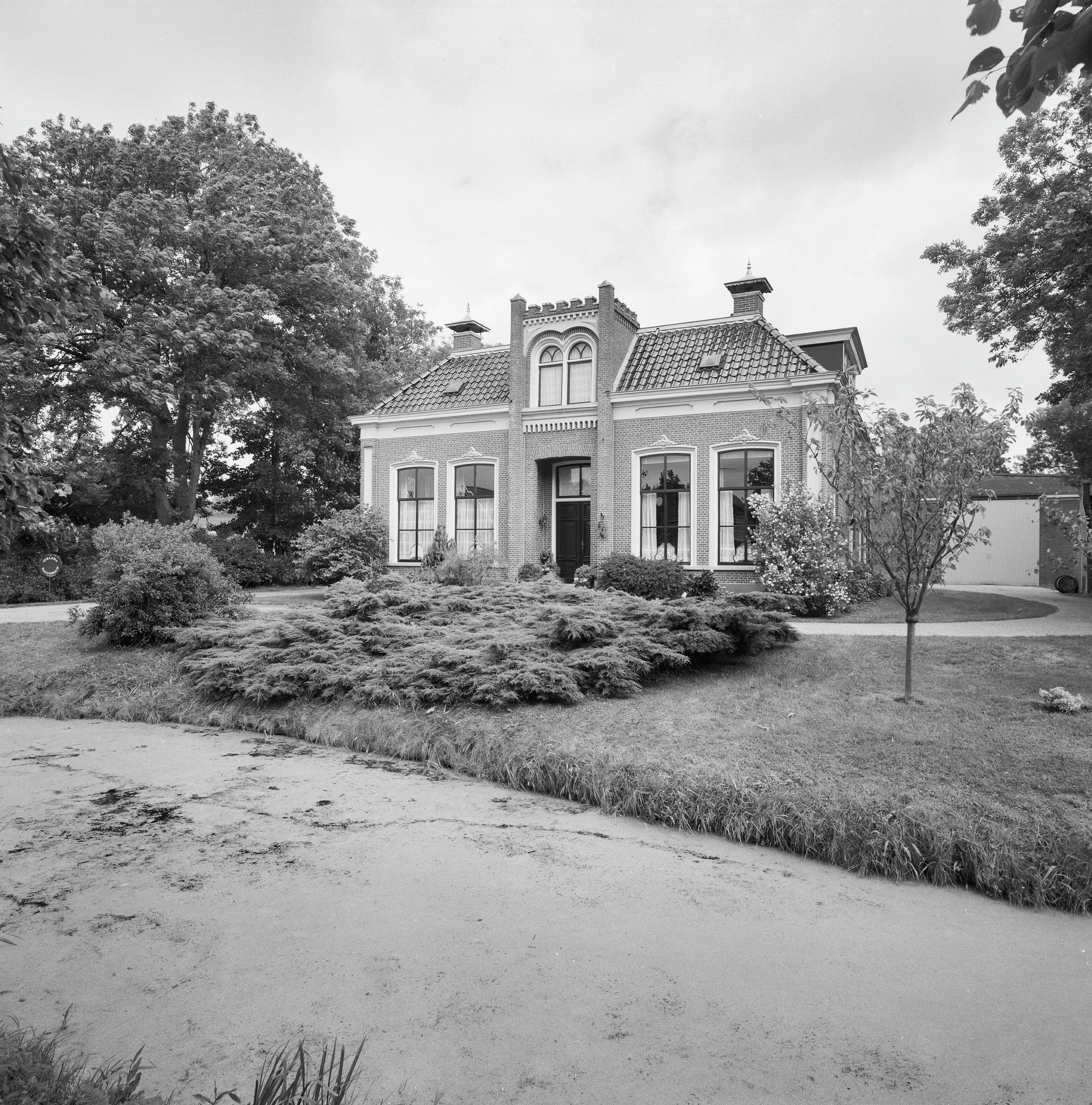
Former boarding school
