= Waaksens =

- Village
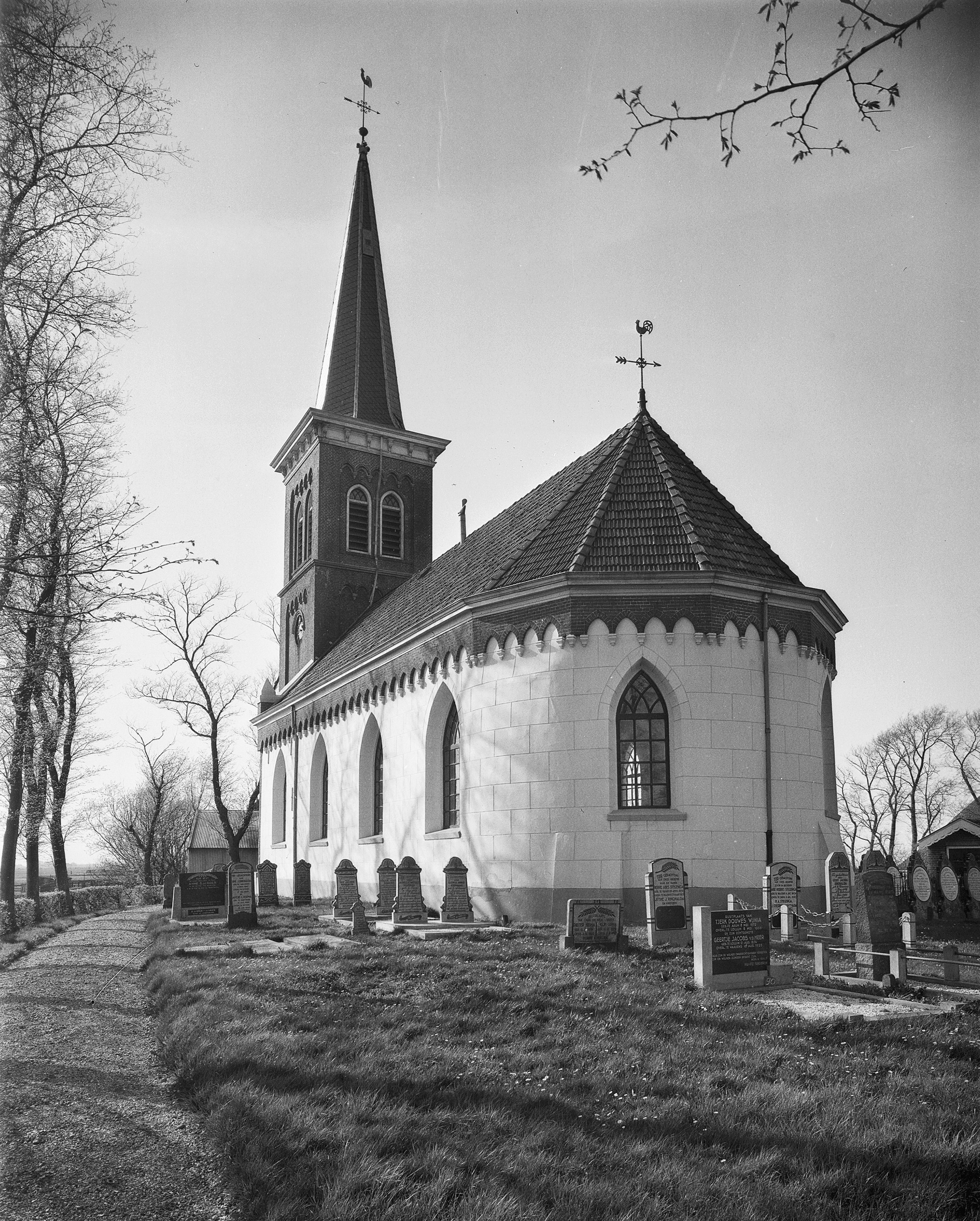
- Waaksens church in 1959

- Flag Coat of arms

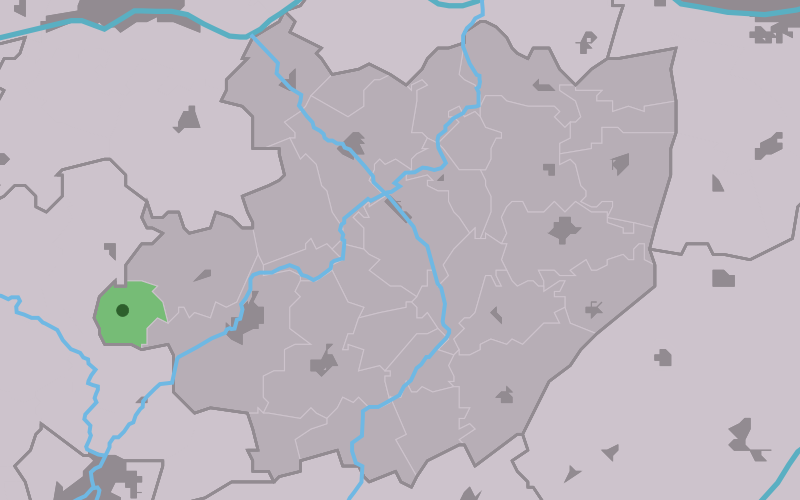
- Location in the former Littenseradiel municipality

- Location in the Netherlands Waaksens (Netherlands)
- Country: Netherlands
- Province: Friesland
- Municipality: Súdwest-Fryslân

Area
  - Total: 2.67 km^{2} (1.03 sq mi)
- Elevation: 0.6 m (2.0 ft)

Population (2021)
  - Total: 90
  - Density: 34/km^{2} (87/sq mi)
- Time zone: UTC+1 (CET)
  - Summer (DST): UTC+2 (CEST)
- Postal code: 8845
- Dialing code: 0517

Waaksens is a village in Súdwest-Fryslân in the province of Friesland, the Netherlands. It had a population of around 83 in January 2017.

== History ==
The village was first mentioned in the 13th century as Waxlinghe, and probably means "settlement of the people of Wachsa (person)". Waaksens is a little terp (artificial living hill) village. The houses and farms are scatter around the church. It used be an isolated village, because it lacked both road and water connections.

The church was probably built in the 13th century, but might be older. The church was renovated in 1742, and the tower was replaced around 1880.

Waaksens was home to 58 people in 1840. In 19th century a road was built through the polder which ended the isolation of the village. Before 2018, the village was part of the Littenseradiel municipality and before 1984 it belonged to Hennaarderadeel municipality.
