= Leons, Friesland =

Leons Lions
- Village
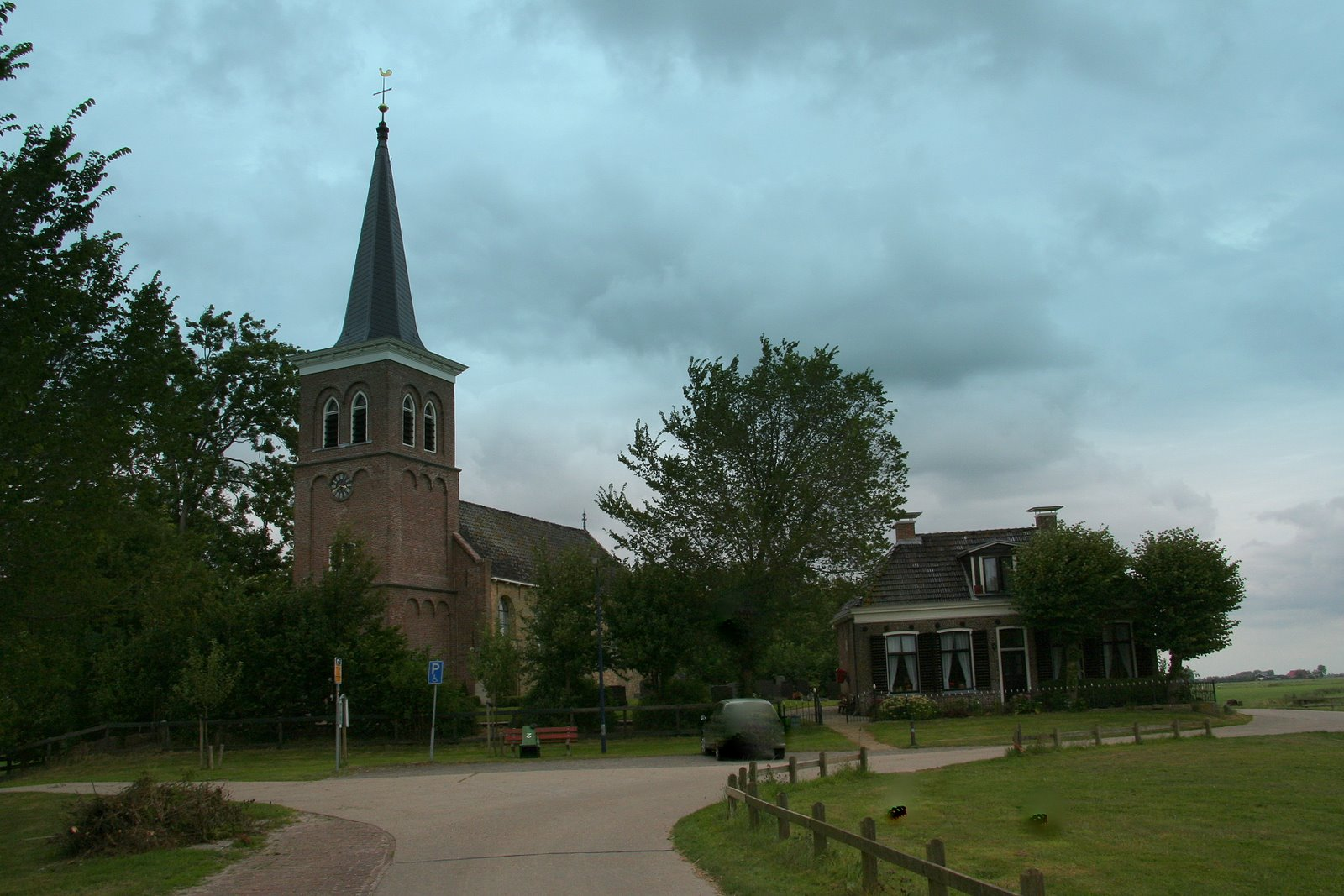
- Leons church

- Coat of arms

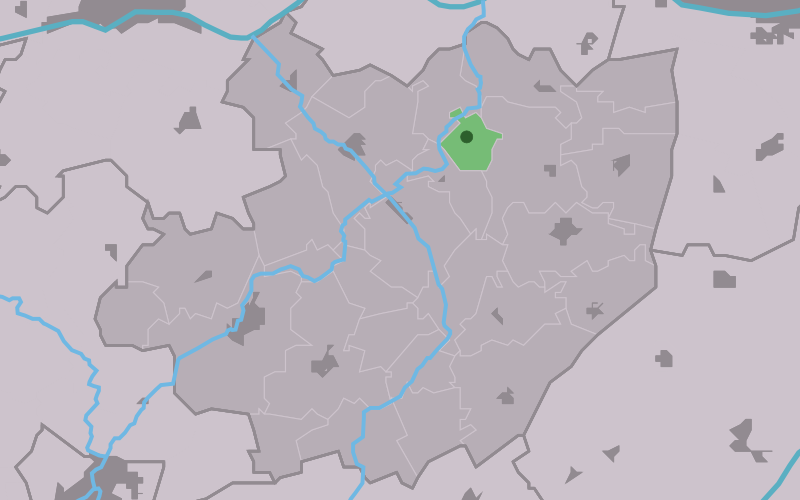
- Location in the former Littenseradiel municipality

- Location in the Netherlands Leons (Netherlands)
- Country: Netherlands
- Province: Friesland
- Municipality: Leeuwarden

Area
  - Total: 1.92 km^{2} (0.74 sq mi)
- Elevation: 0.8 m (2.6 ft)

Population (2021)
  - Total: 25
  - Density: 13/km^{2} (34/sq mi)
- Time zone: UTC+1 (CET)
  - Summer (DST): UTC+2 (CEST)
- Postal code: 8833
- Dialing code: 0517

Leons (Dutch: Lions) is a small village in Leeuwarden municipality in the Dutch province of Friesland. Situated in pastoral farming country, the village had 26 inhabitants in January 2017.

== History ==
The settlement was first mentioned in the 13th century as Leonghem, and means "settlement of the people of Lieuwe (a person)". The Dutch Reformed church dates from the 14th century. The tower was constructed in the 19th century. In 1840, Leons was home to 38 people.

Before 2018, the village was part of the Littenseradiel municipality and before 1984 it belonged to the Baarderadeel municipality.

== Gallery ==
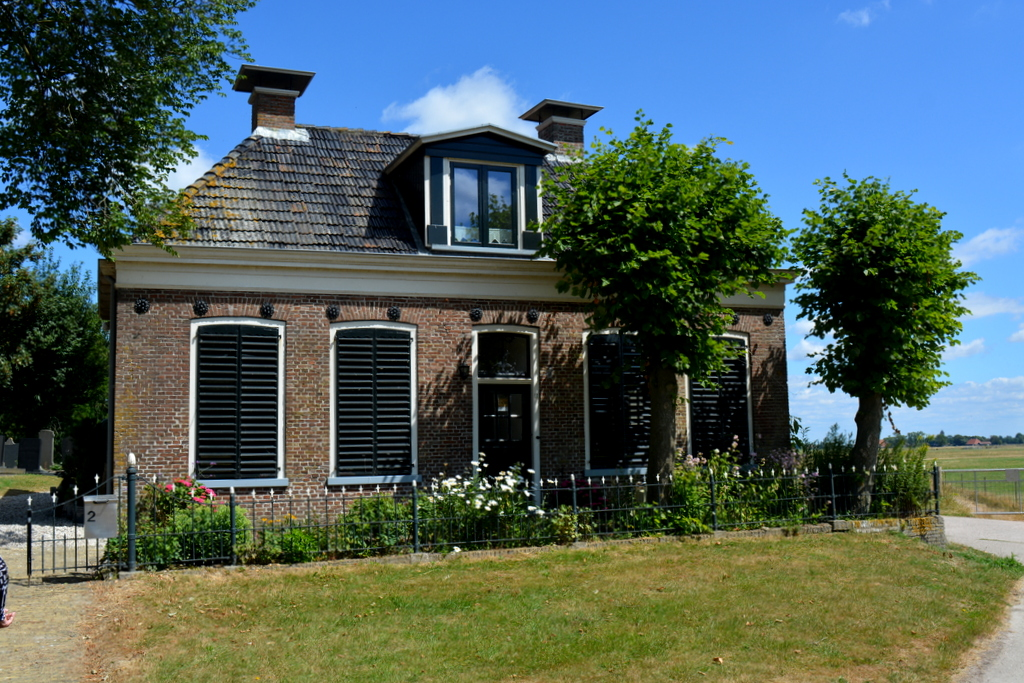
Clergy house

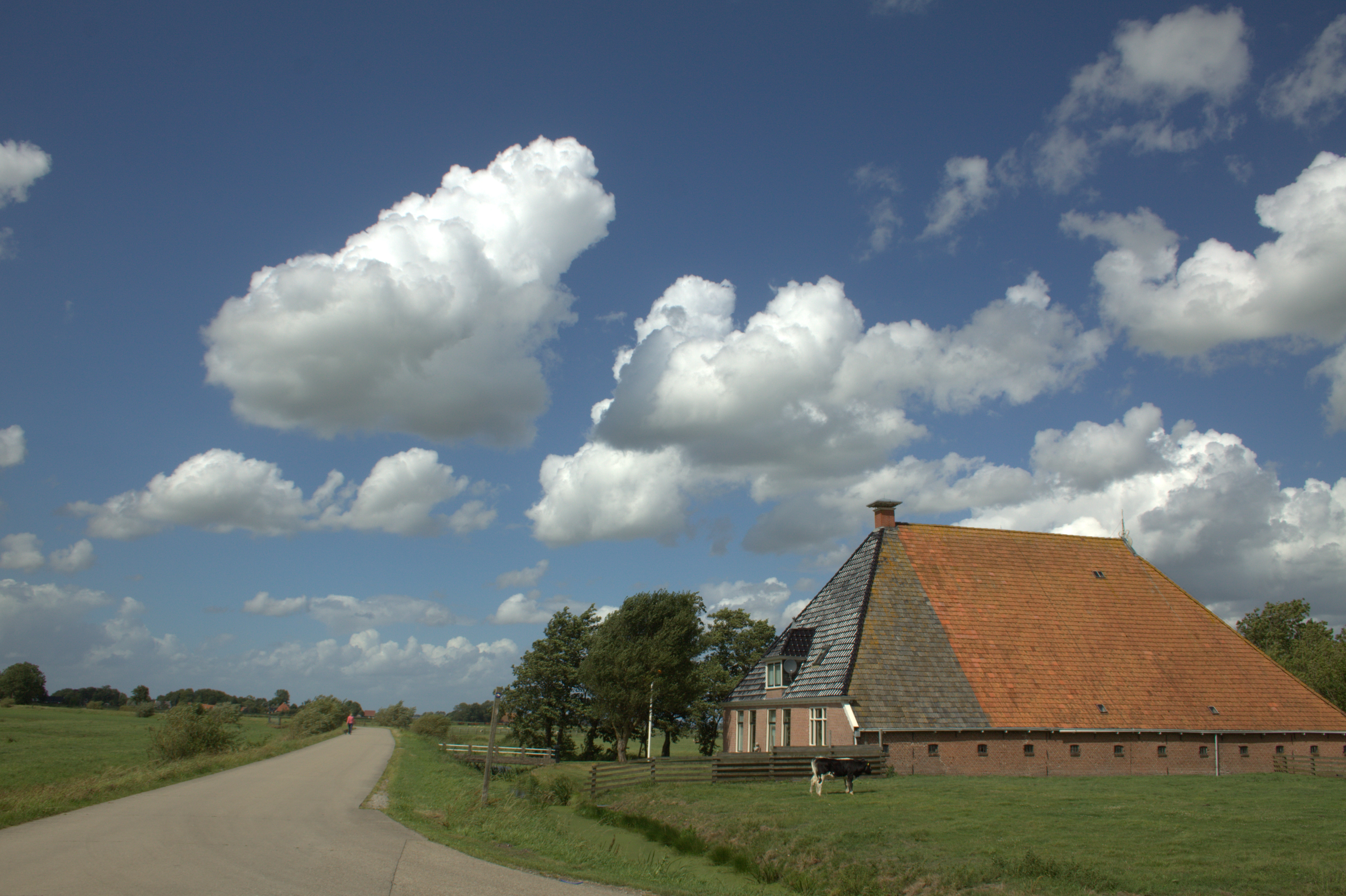
Farm in Leons
