= Baard, Friesland =

Baard
- Village
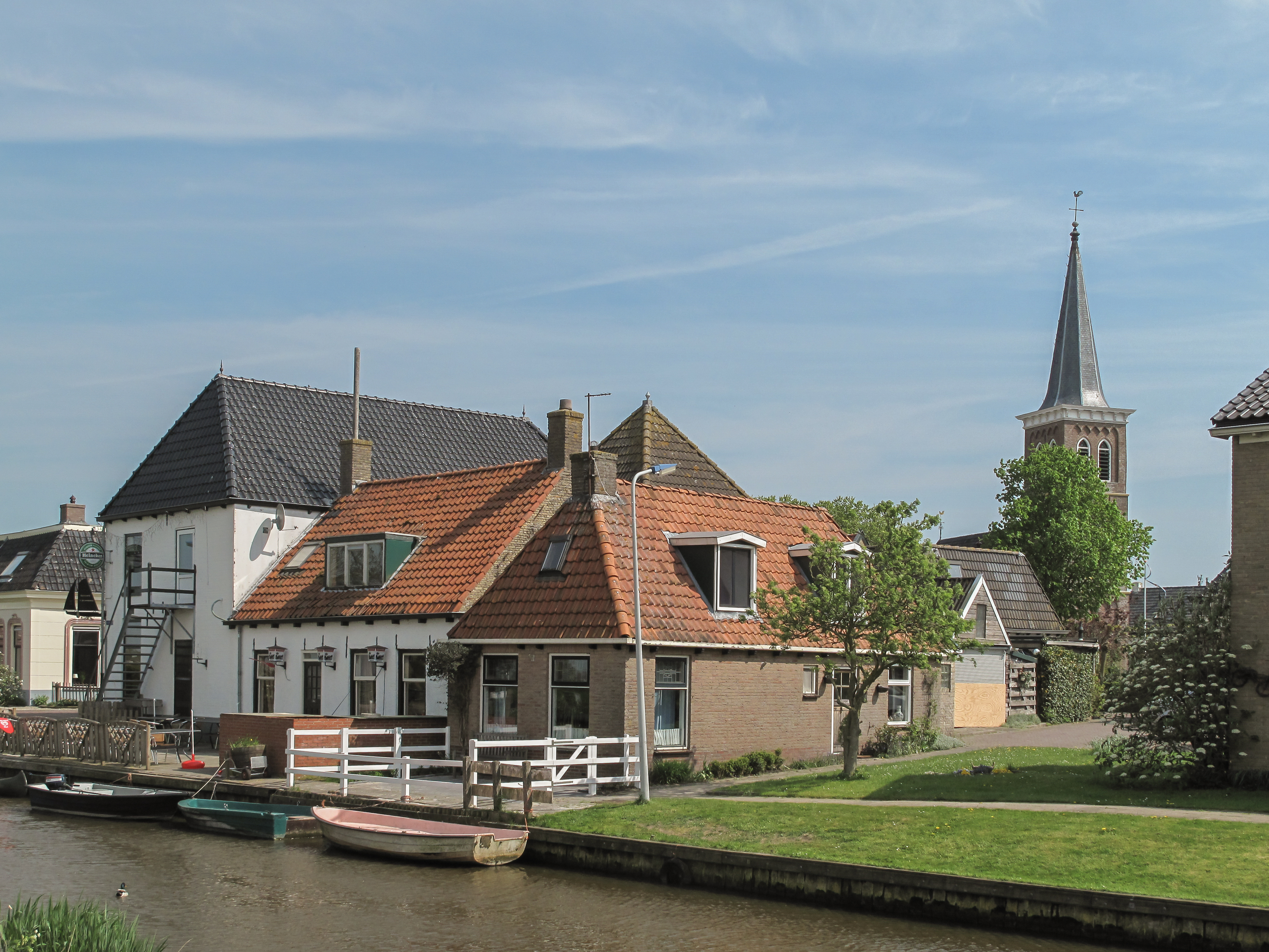
- Baard, church in the street

- Flag Coat of arms

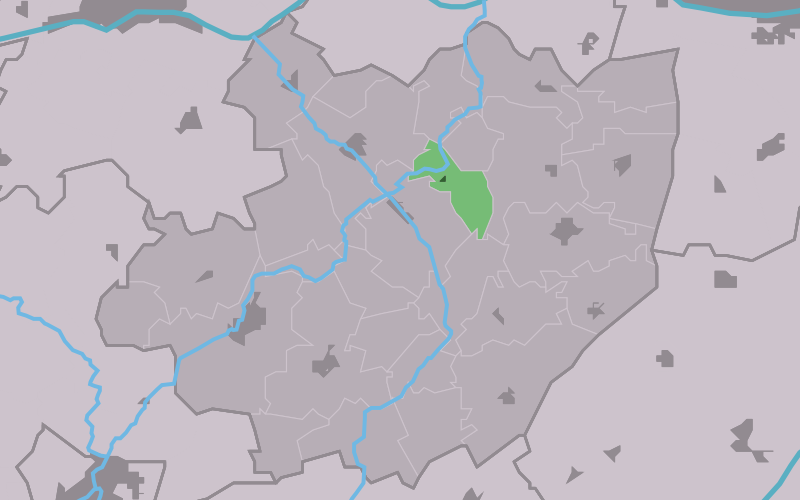
- Location in the former Littenseradiel municipality

- Location in the Netherlands Baard (Netherlands)
- Country: Netherlands
- Province: Friesland
- Municipality: Leeuwarden

Area
  - Total: 2.56 km^{2} (0.99 sq mi)
- Elevation: 0.8 m (2.6 ft)

Population (2021)
  - Total: 195
  - Density: 76.2/km^{2} (197/sq mi)
- Time zone: UTC+1 (CET)
  - Summer (DST): UTC+2 (CEST)
- Postal code: 8834
- Dialing code: 0517

Baard is a village in the Dutch province of Friesland. It is located in the municipality Leeuwarden, about 10 km southwest of the city of Leeuwarden. Baard had a population of about 189 in January 2017.

== History ==
The village was first mentioned in 1329 as Bawerth, and means a terp (artificial living mound) of Bavo (a person). The first church was built around 1250. The current church dates from 1876. In 1840, it was home to 244 people.

Before 2018, the village was part of the Littenseradiel municipality and before 1984 it belonged to Baarderadeel municipality.

== Gallery ==
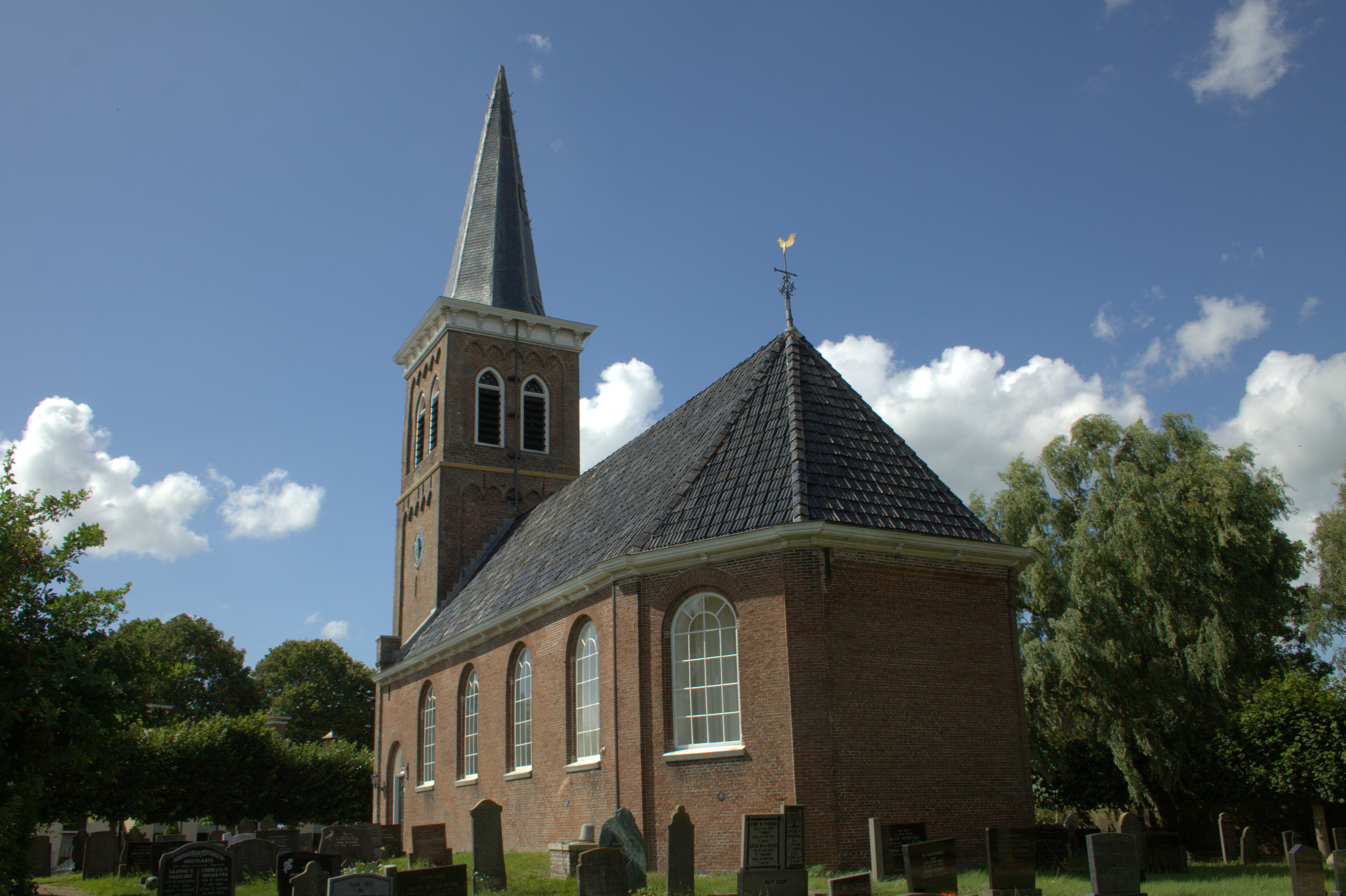
Protestant Church

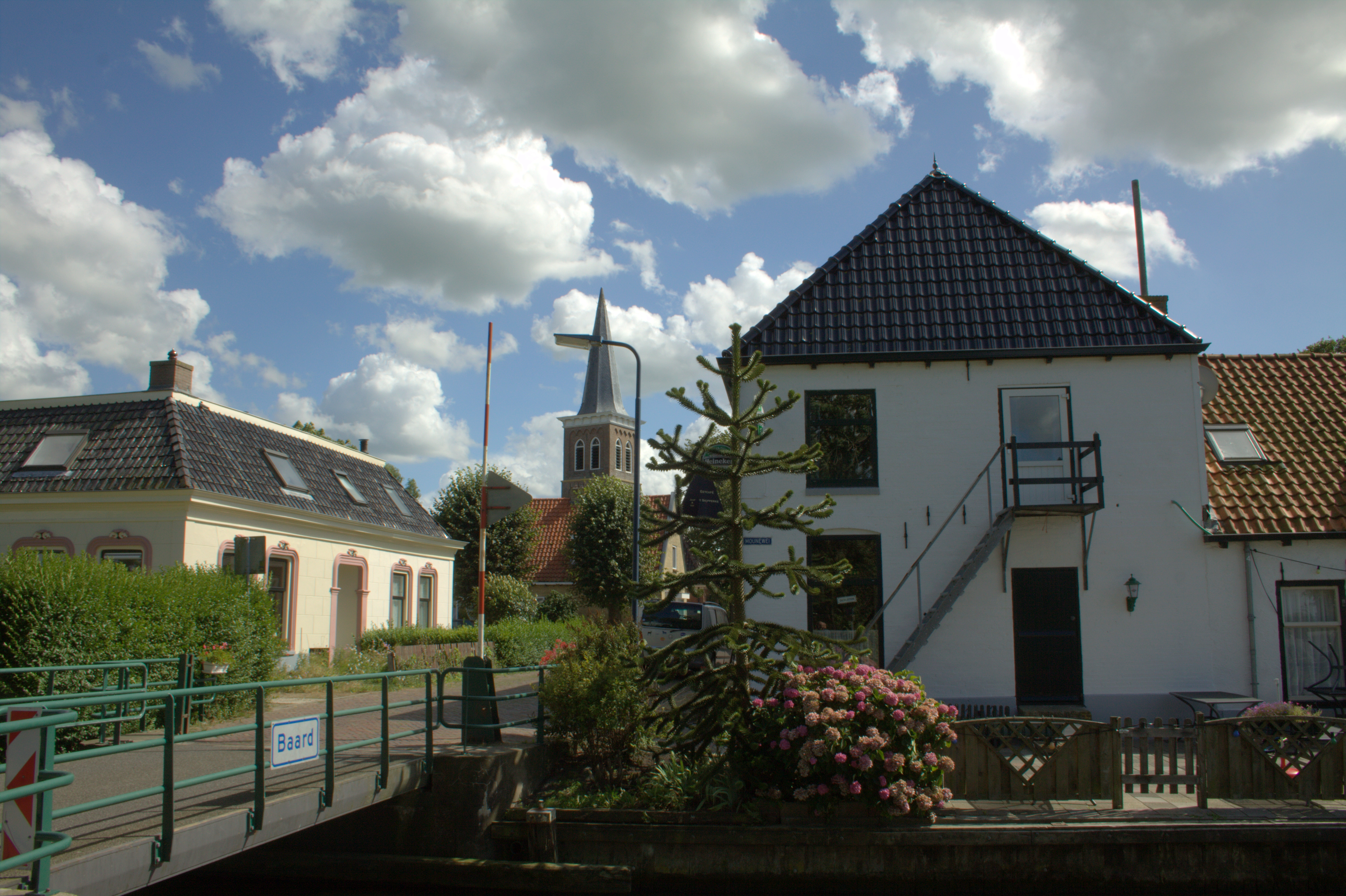
View on the village

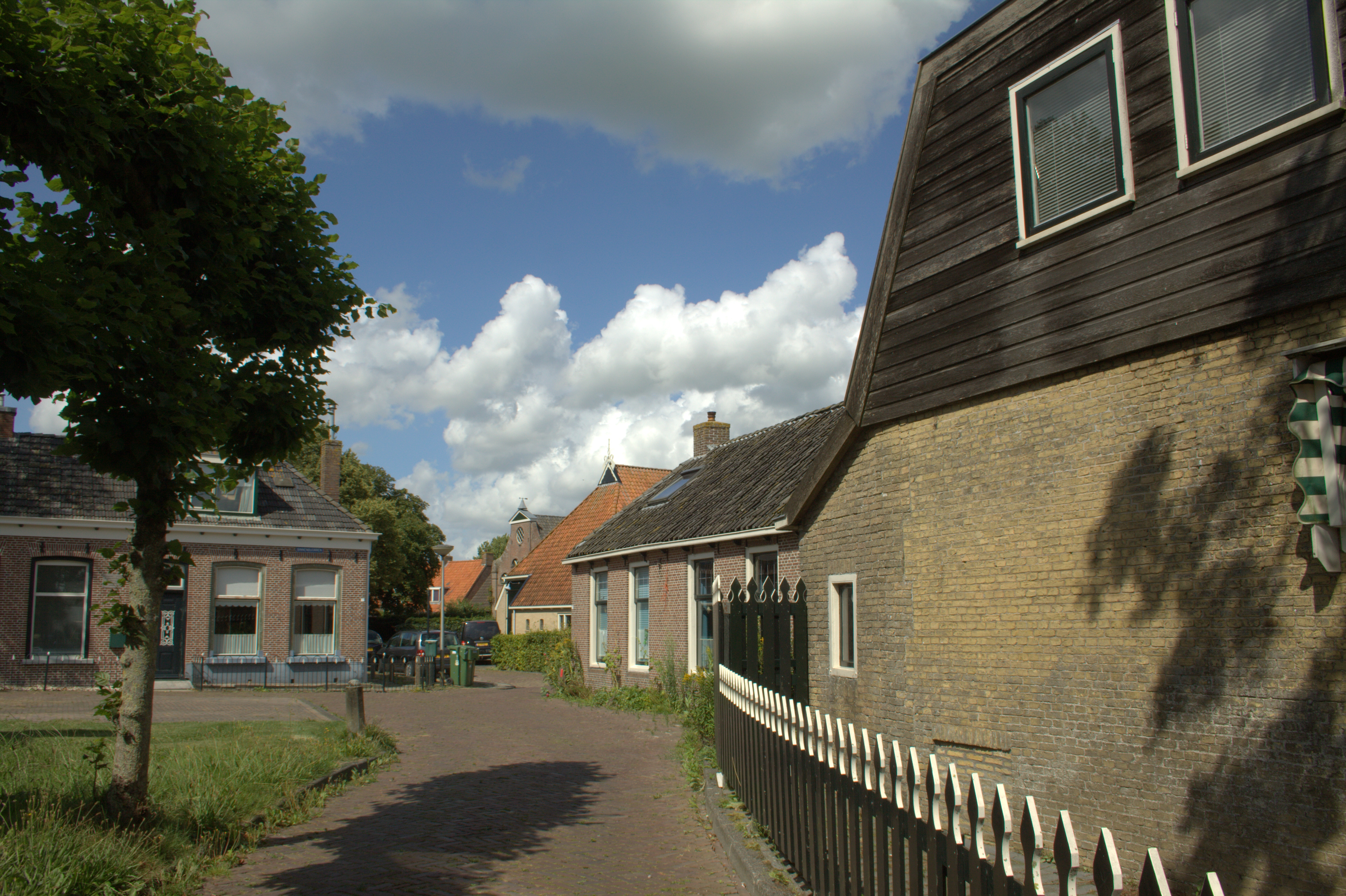
Street view

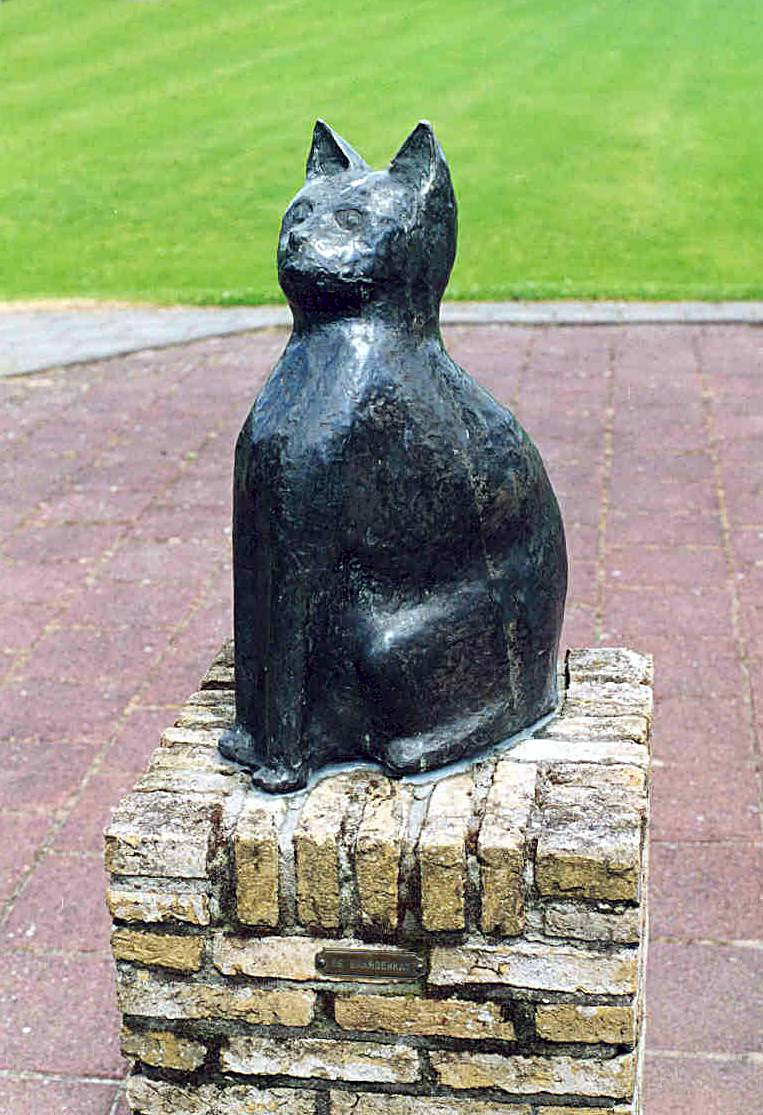
Cat statue
