= Itens =

- Village
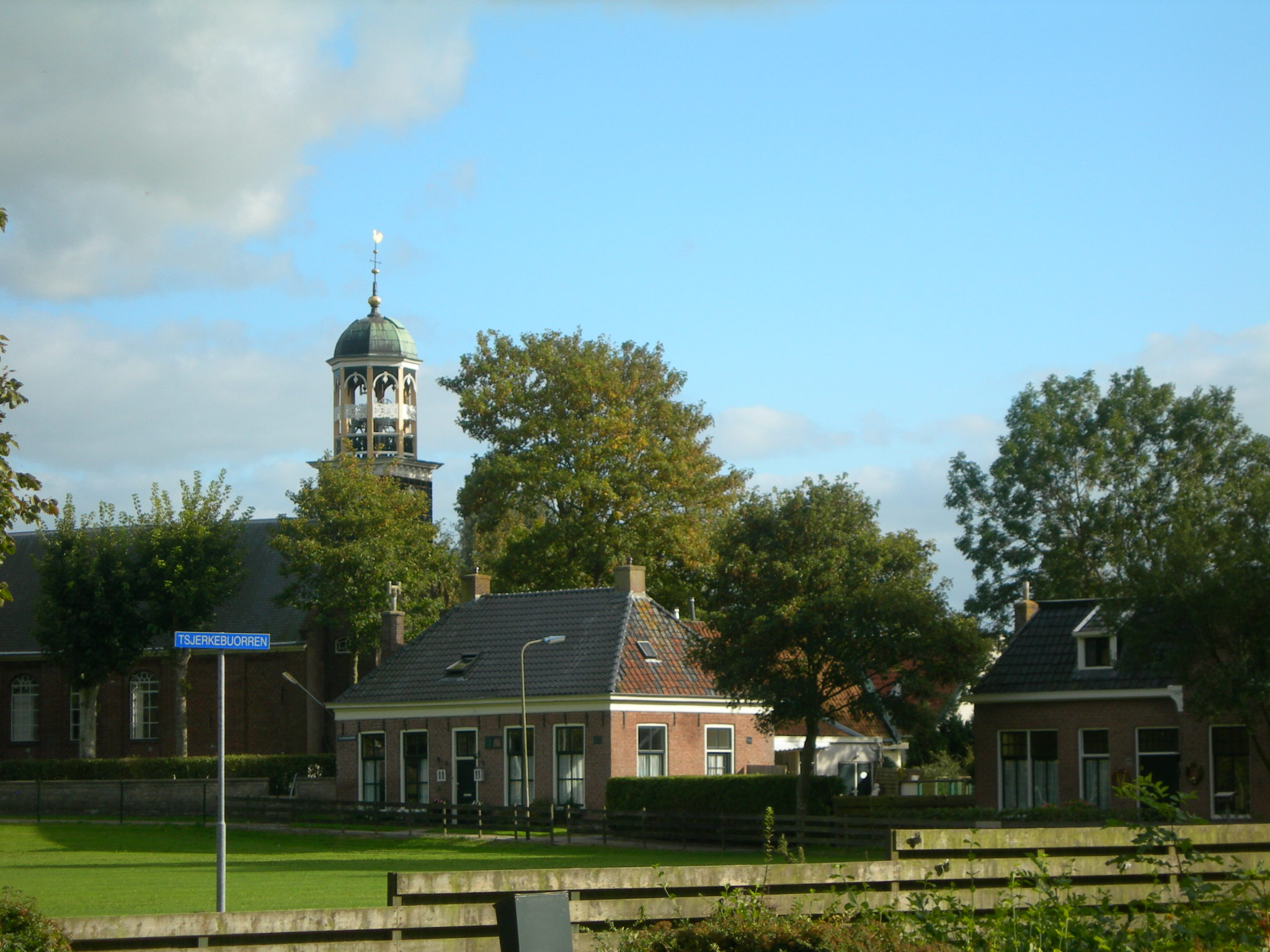

- Coat of arms

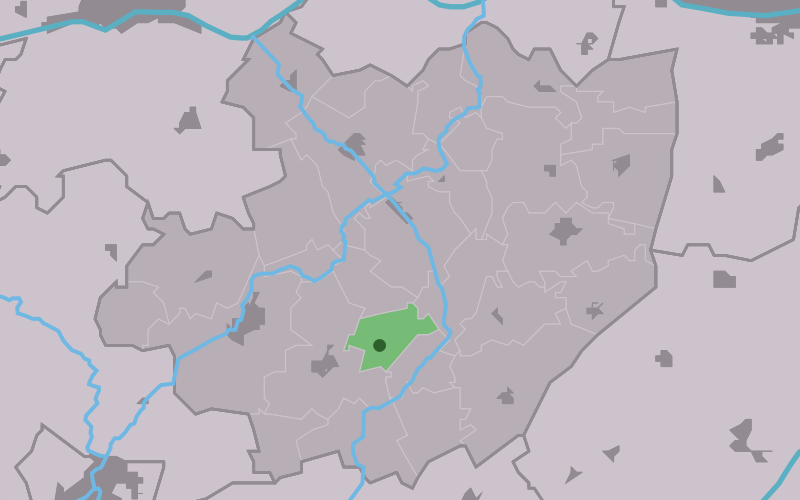
- Location in the former Littenseradiel municipality

- Location in the Netherlands Itens (Netherlands)
- Country: Netherlands
- Province: Friesland
- Municipality: Súdwest-Fryslân

Area
  - Total: 2.59 km^{2} (1.00 sq mi)
- Elevation: 0.5 m (1.6 ft)

Population (2021)
  - Total: 235
  - Density: 90.7/km^{2} (235/sq mi)
- Time zone: UTC+1 (CET)
  - Summer (DST): UTC+2 (CEST)
- Postal code: 8735
- Dialing code: 0515

Itens is a village in Súdwest-Fryslân municipality in the province of Friesland, the Netherlands. It had a population of around 236 in January 2017.

== History ==
The village was first mentioned in 1381 as Ytzinse, and means "settlement of the people of It(s)e (person)". Itens a terp (artificial living hill) village. Pottery has been found in the terp dating from the beginning of our era.

The Dutch Reformed church was built in 1806 and has a tower from 1842. Itens was home to 124 people in 1840. Before 2018, the village was part of the Littenseradiel municipality and before 1984 it belonged to Hennaarderadeel municipality.
