= Hidaard =

- Village
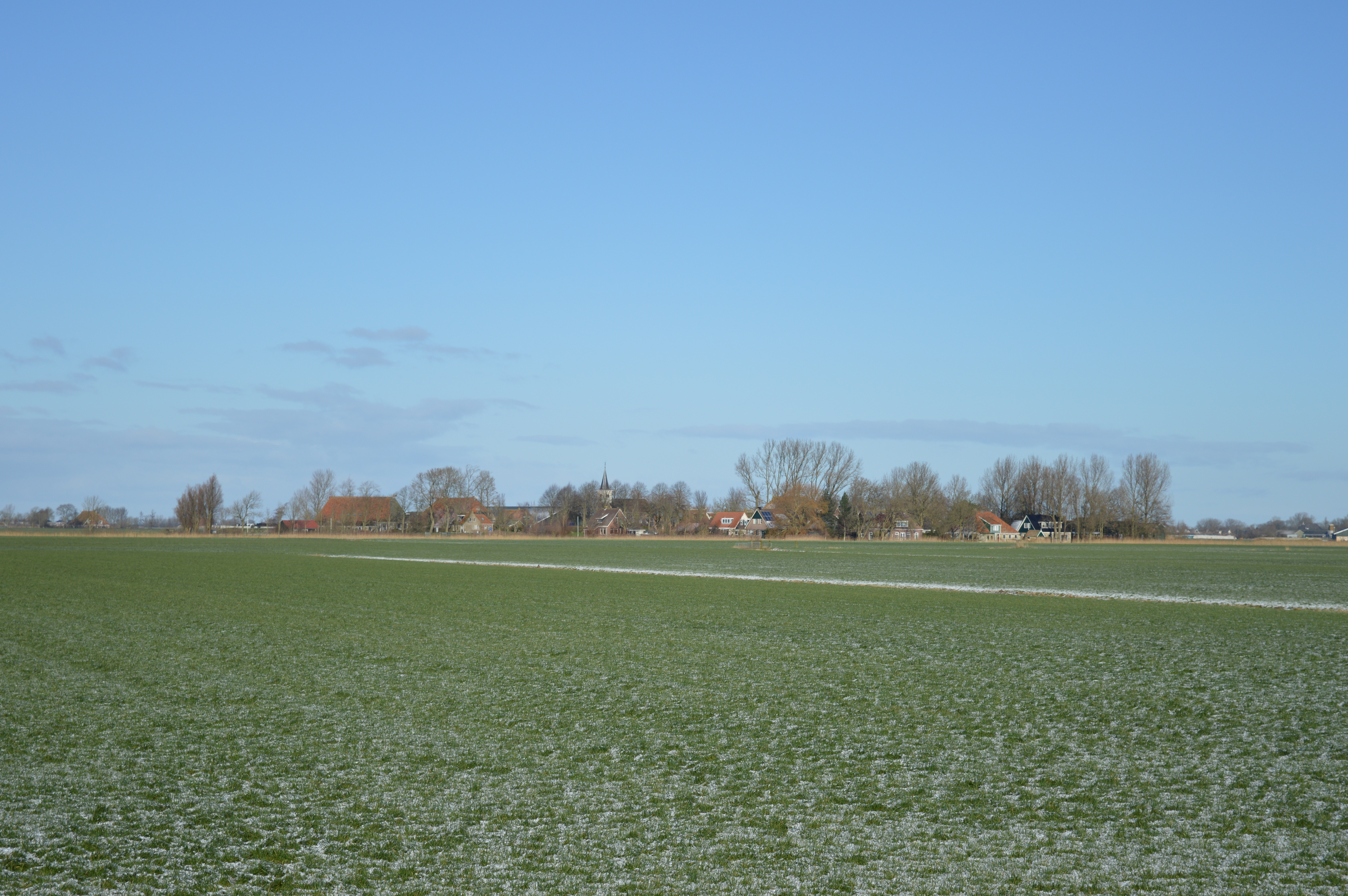

- Coat of arms

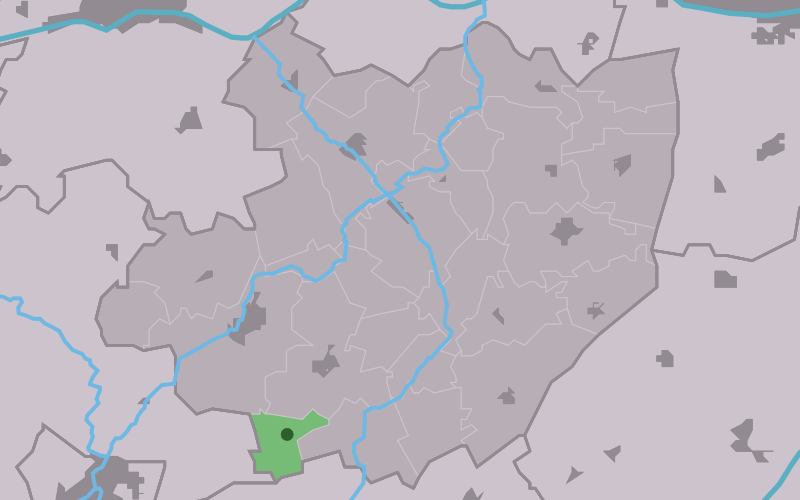
- Location in the former Littenseradiel municipality

- Location in the Netherlands Hidaard (Netherlands)
- Country: Netherlands
- Province: Friesland
- Municipality: Súdwest-Fryslân

Area
  - Total: 2.43 km^{2} (0.94 sq mi)
- Elevation: 0.5 m (1.6 ft)

Population (2021)
  - Total: 125
  - Density: 51.4/km^{2} (133/sq mi)
- Time zone: UTC+1 (CET)
  - Summer (DST): UTC+2 (CEST)
- Postal code: 8737
- Dialing code: 0515

Hidaard is a small village in Súdwest-Fryslân municipality in the province of Friesland, the Netherlands. It had a population of around 130 in January 2017.

== History ==
The village was first mentioned in the 13th century as Hedawere, and means "terp of Heda/Hidde (person)". Hidaard is a small terp (artificial living hill) village on the eastern tip of the former Easterein peninsula. It is still located on a dead-end road.

The Dutch Reformed church dates from 1873 and is a replacement of a medieval church. According to a legend, the first church was founded in 1303. During the restoration, the grave of the last abbot of the Bloemkamp Abbey discovered in the church.

Hidaard was home to 146 people in 1840. Before 2018, the village was part of the Littenseradiel municipality and before 1984 it belonged to Hennaarderadeel municipality.

== Gallery ==
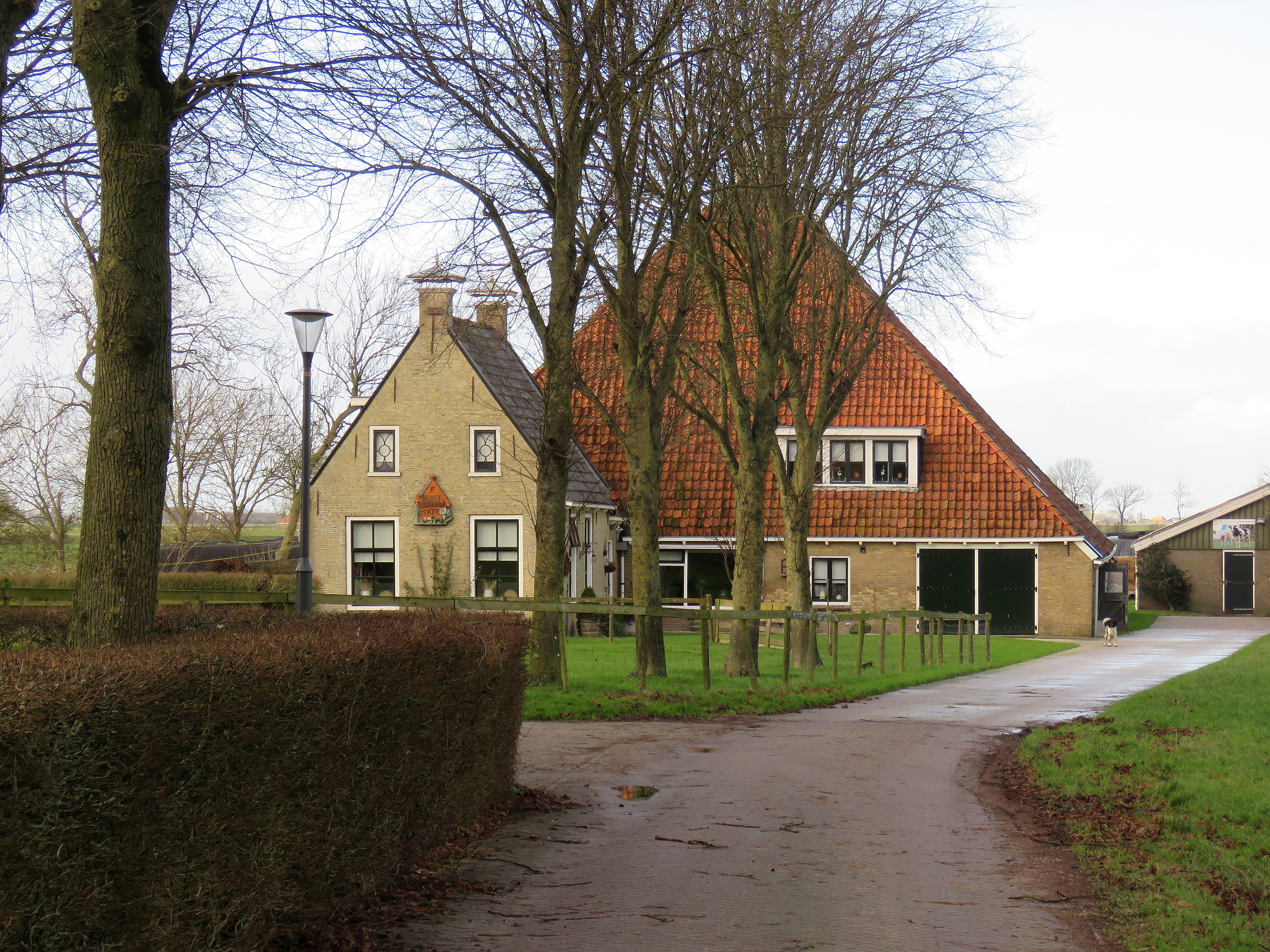
Farm in Hidaard

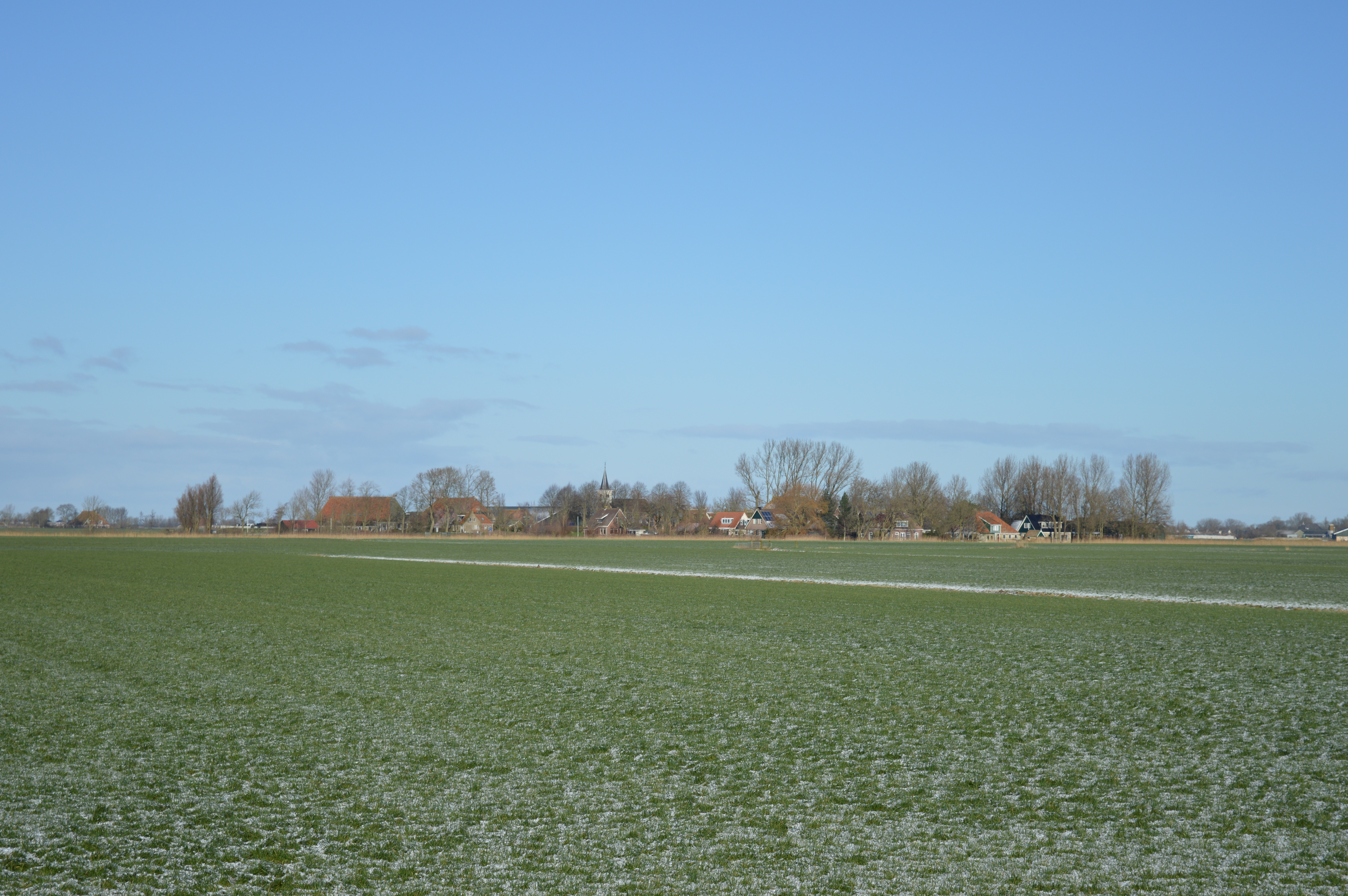
View on Hidaard
