= Britswert =

Britswerd Britswert
- Village
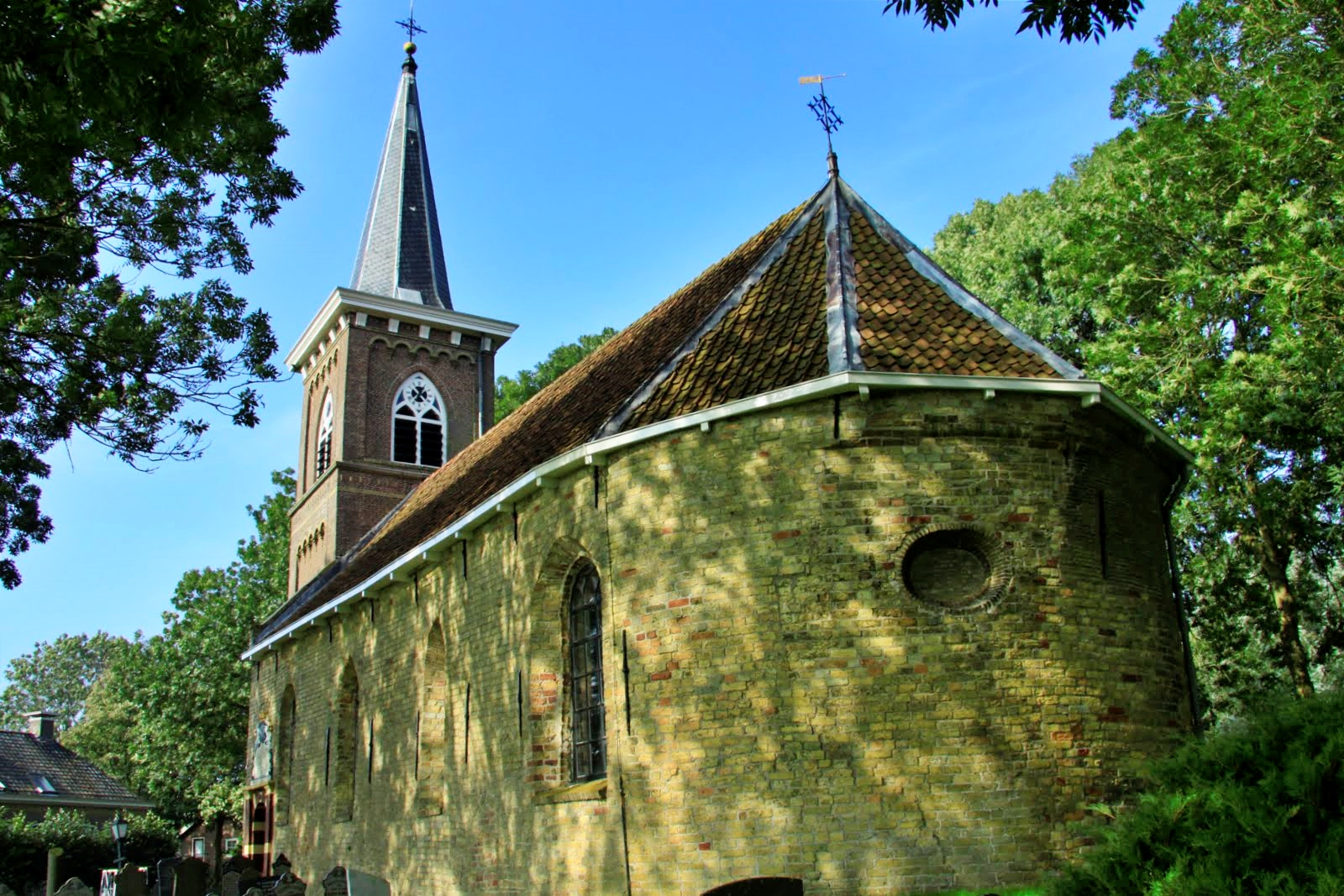
- Britswert church

- Flag Coat of arms

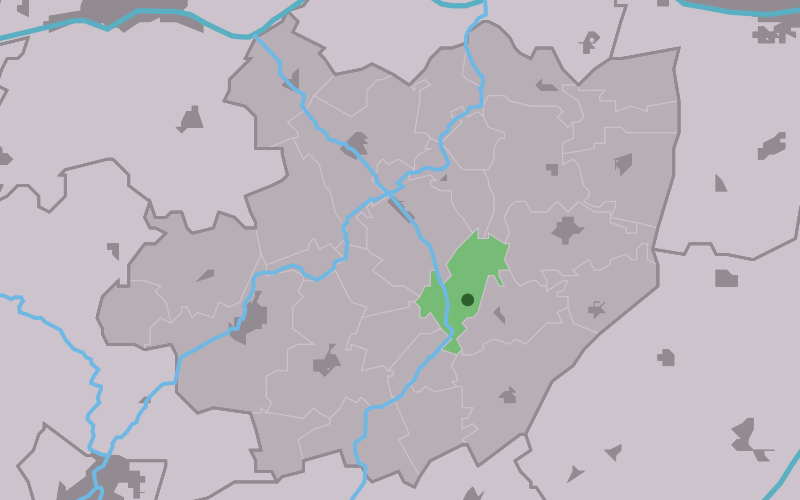
- Location in the former Littenseradiel municipality

- Location in the Netherlands Britswerd (Netherlands)
- Country: Netherlands
- Province: Friesland
- Municipality: Súdwest-Fryslân

Area
  - Total: 4.26 km^{2} (1.64 sq mi)
- Elevation: 0.2 m (0.66 ft)

Population (2021)
  - Total: 105
  - Density: 24.6/km^{2} (63.8/sq mi)
- Time zone: UTC+1 (CET)
  - Summer (DST): UTC+2 (CEST)
- Postal code: 8636
- Dialing code: 058

Britswert (Dutch: Britswerd) is a small village in Súdwest-Fryslân municipality in the province of Friesland, the Netherlands. It had a population of around 112 in January 2017.

== History ==
The village was first mentioned in the late-13th century as Bretsenewarth, and means "broken or split terp. Britswert is a terp (artificial living hill) villages which was located between two lakes. The Britswerdermeer was finally poldered in 1885. The St Joris Church dates from the 12th century, however it was restored after a fire in 1514, and the tower was rebuilt in 1889. The village as home to both fishermen and farmers. Between 1200 and 1300, the Middelzee silted, and the village gradually became an agricultural community.

Britswert was home to 120 people in 1840. Before 2018, the village was part of the Littenseradiel municipality.

== Gallery ==
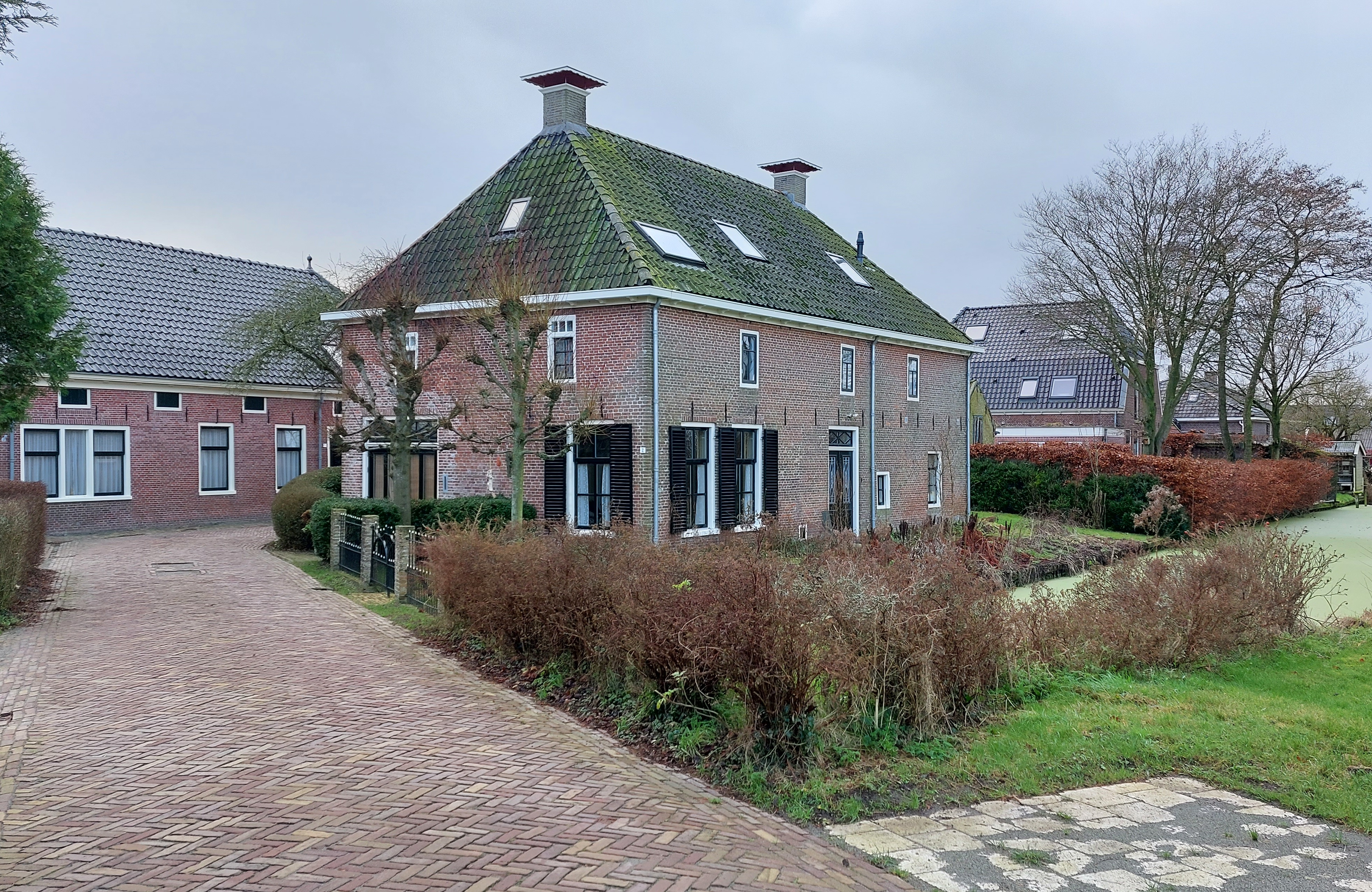
Houses in Britswert

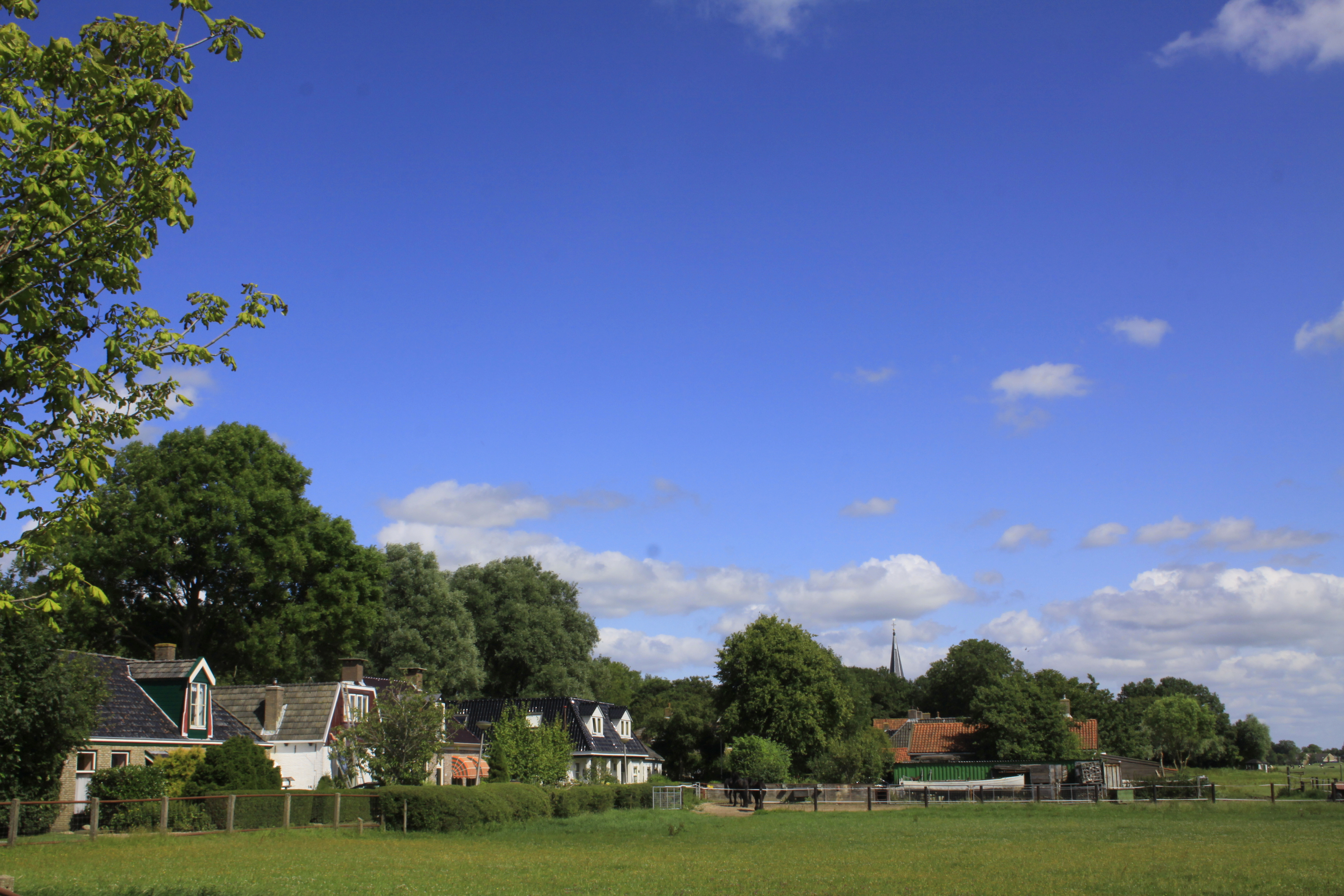
View on Britswert
