= Hilaard =

Hijlaard Hilaard
- Village
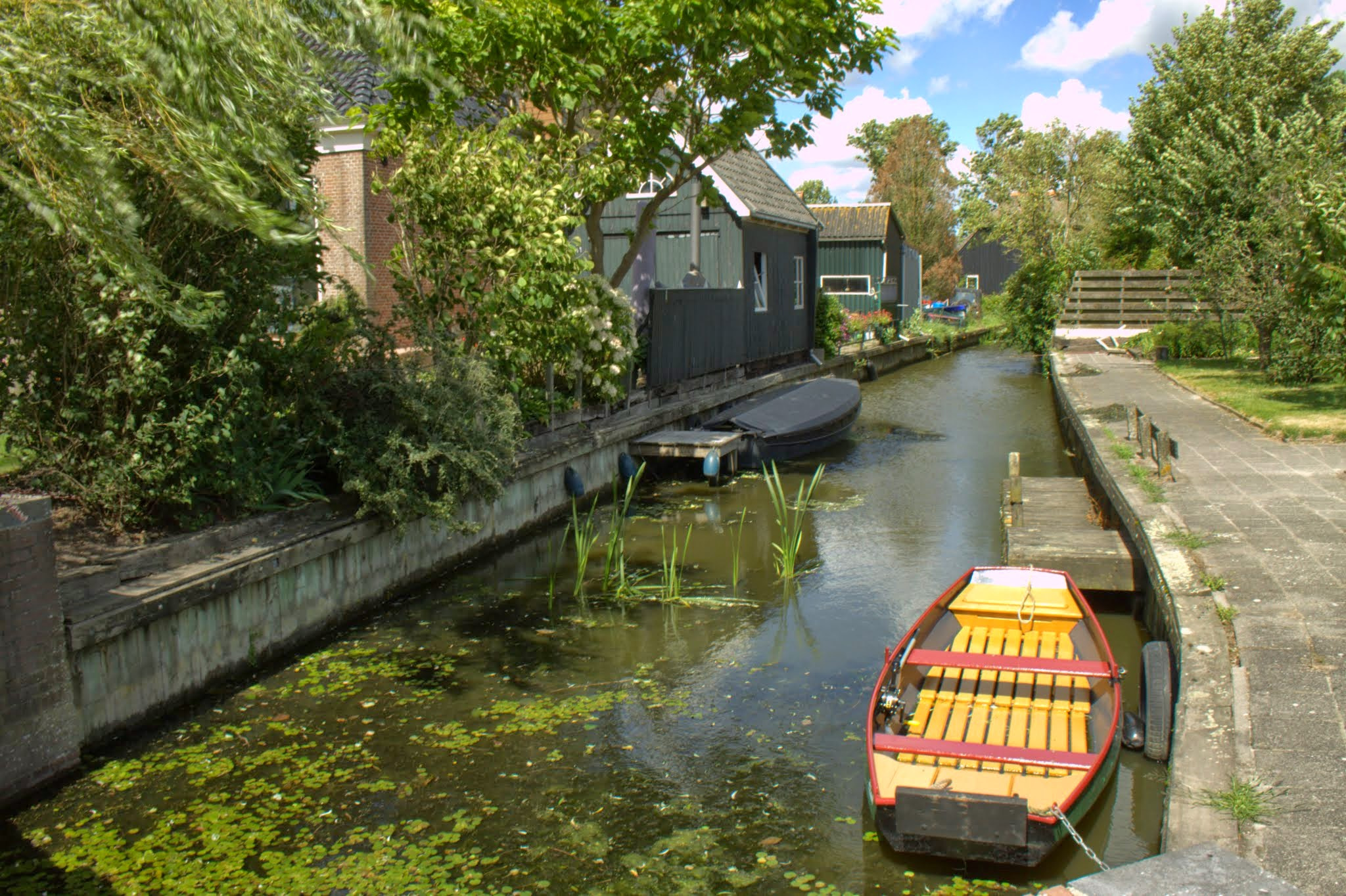
- Canal view

- Flag Coat of arms

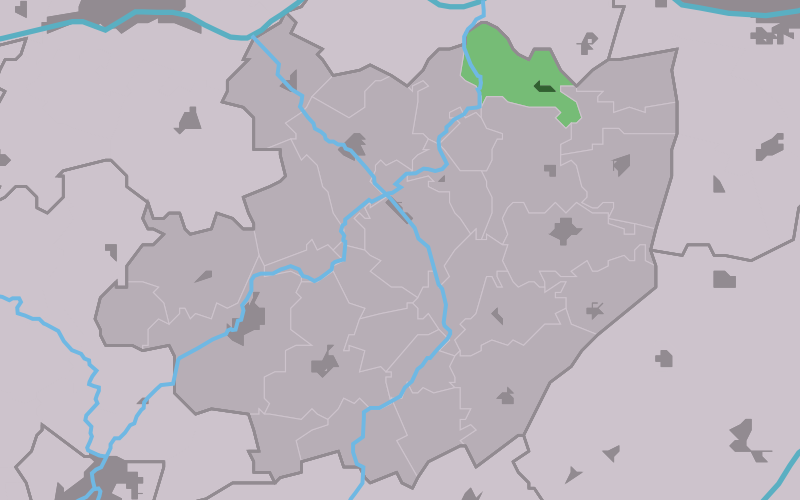
- Location in the former Littenseradiel municipality

- Location in the Netherlands Hijlaard (Netherlands)
- Country: Netherlands
- Province: Friesland
- Municipality: Leeuwarden

Area
  - Total: 4.92 km^{2} (1.90 sq mi)
- Elevation: 0.5 m (1.6 ft)

Population (2021)
  - Total: 295
  - Density: 60.0/km^{2} (155/sq mi)
- Time zone: UTC+1 (CET)
  - Summer (DST): UTC+2 (CEST)
- Postal code: 9027
- Dialing code: 058

Hilaard (Dutch: Hijlaard) is a village in Leeuwarden municipality in the province of Friesland, the Netherlands. It had a population of around 297 in January 2017.

== History ==
It was first mentioned in 1329 as Elawerth, and means "settlement of the people of Ele (person / noble man)". Hilaard is a terp (artificial living mound) village from the middle ages. The John the Baptist Church has a 13th-century tower. The church itself dates from the 15th or 16th century. The Bolswarder Tolhuis is a former toll house and has a 1652 weapon of the city of Bolsward for whom the toll was collected. In 1840, Hilaard was home to 229 people.

Before 2018, the village was part of the Littenseradiel municipality.

== Gallery ==
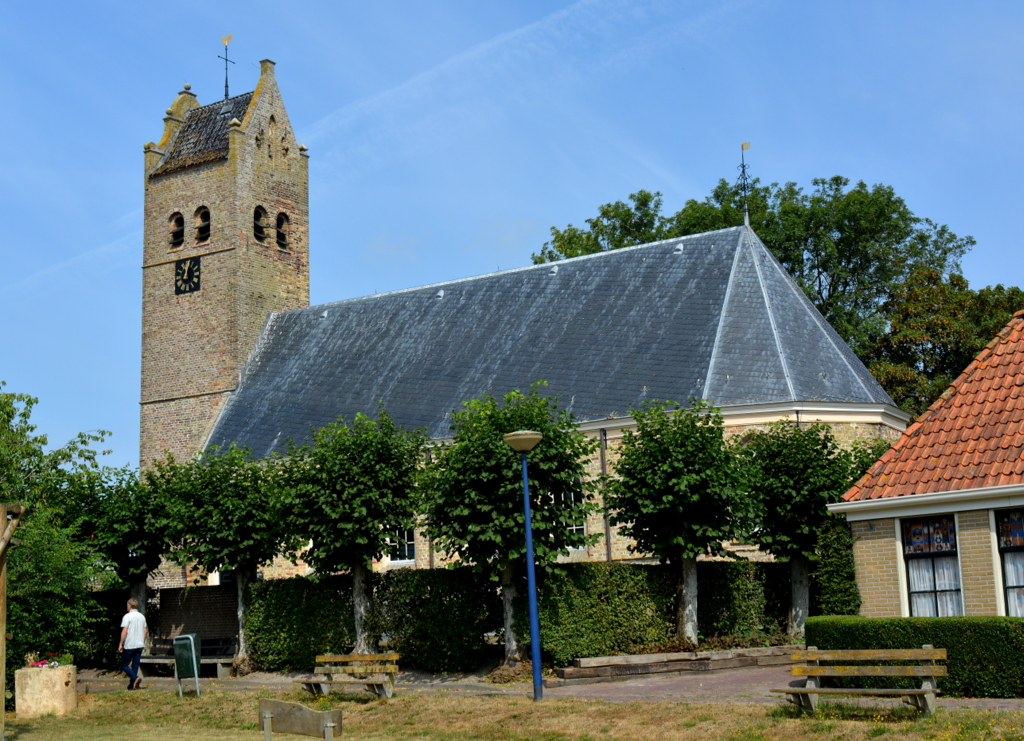
John the Baptist Church

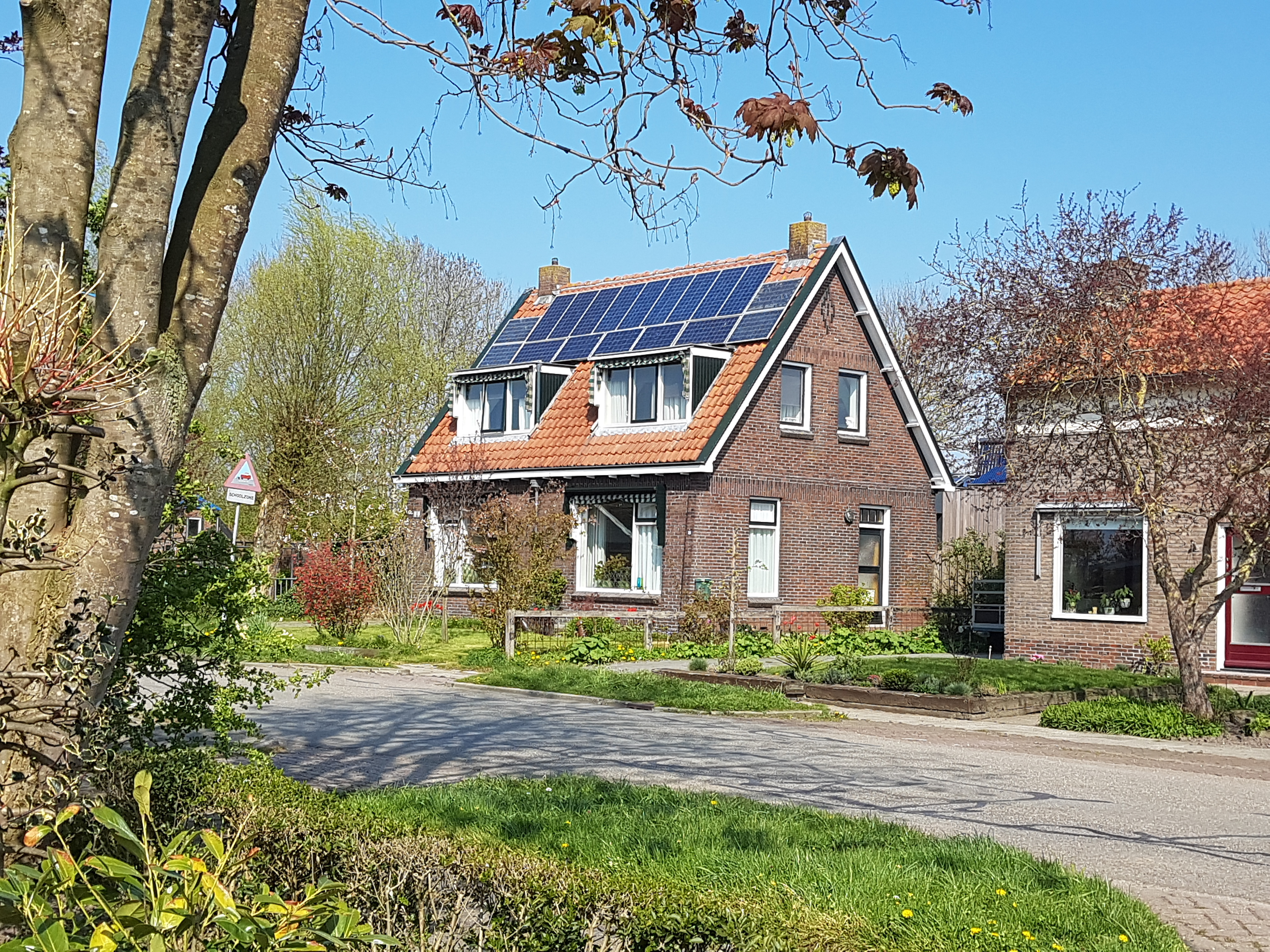
House with solar panels

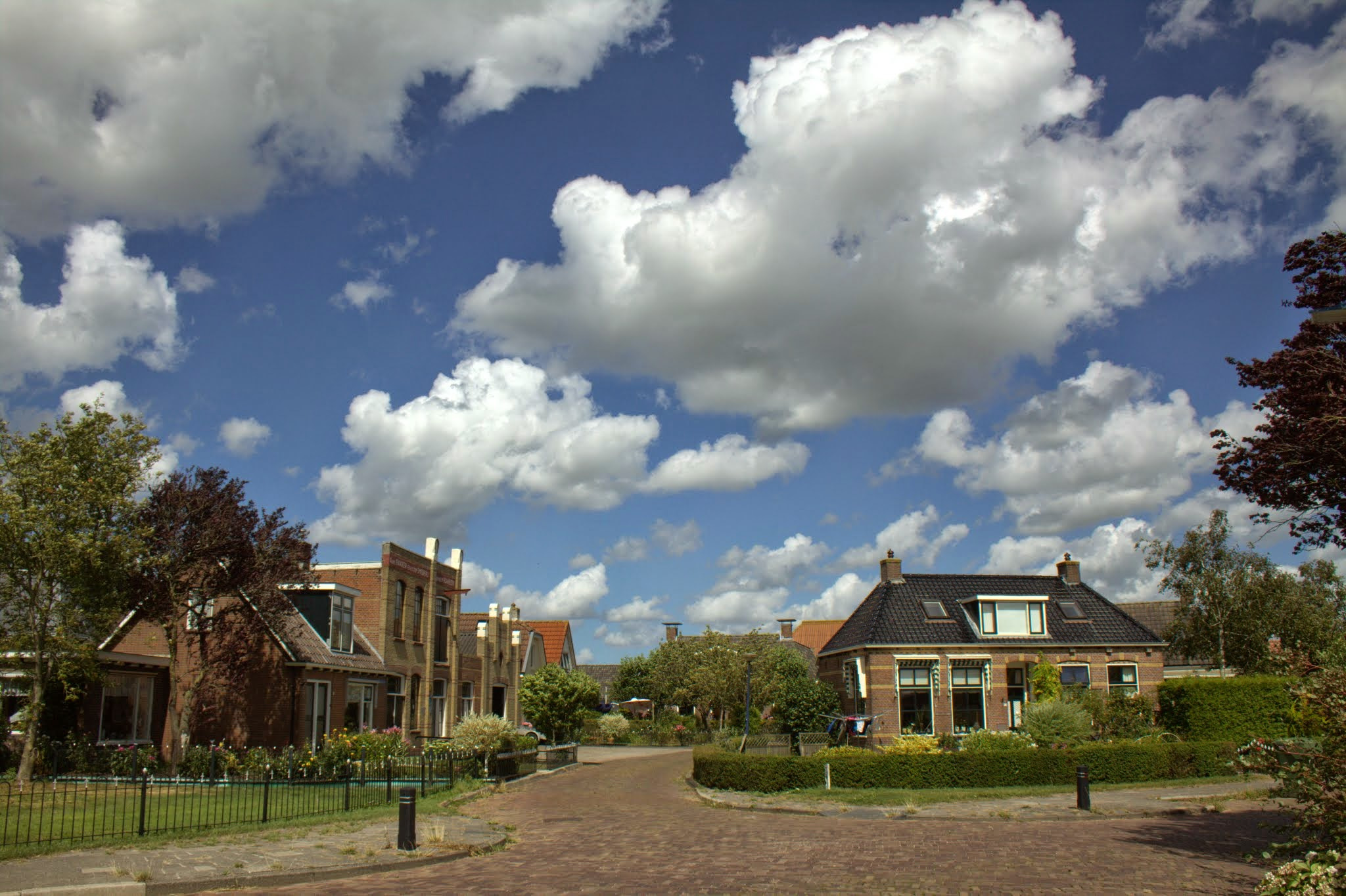
Village view

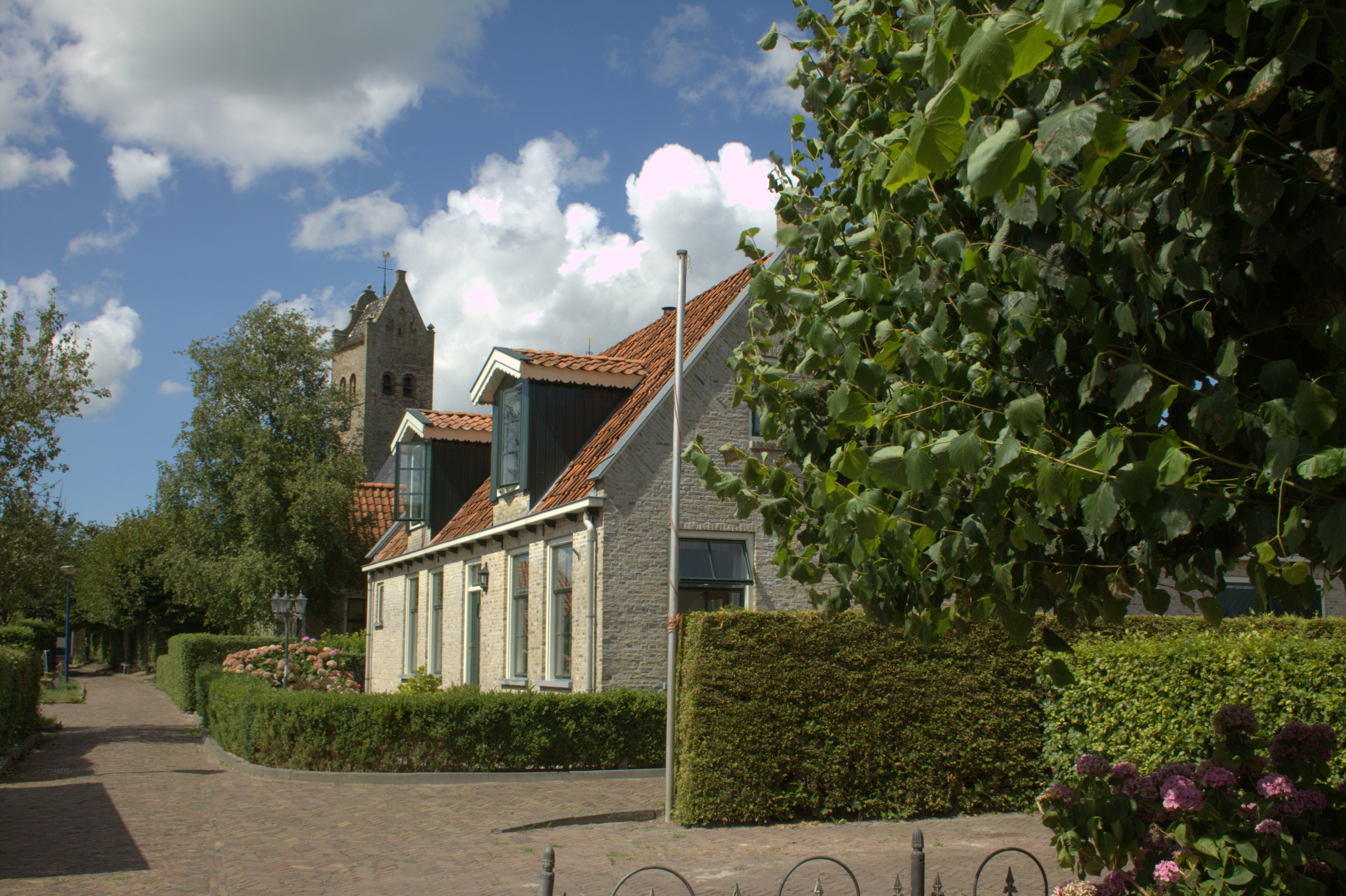
Village view
