= Lytsewierrum =

Lutkewierum Lytsewierrum
- Village
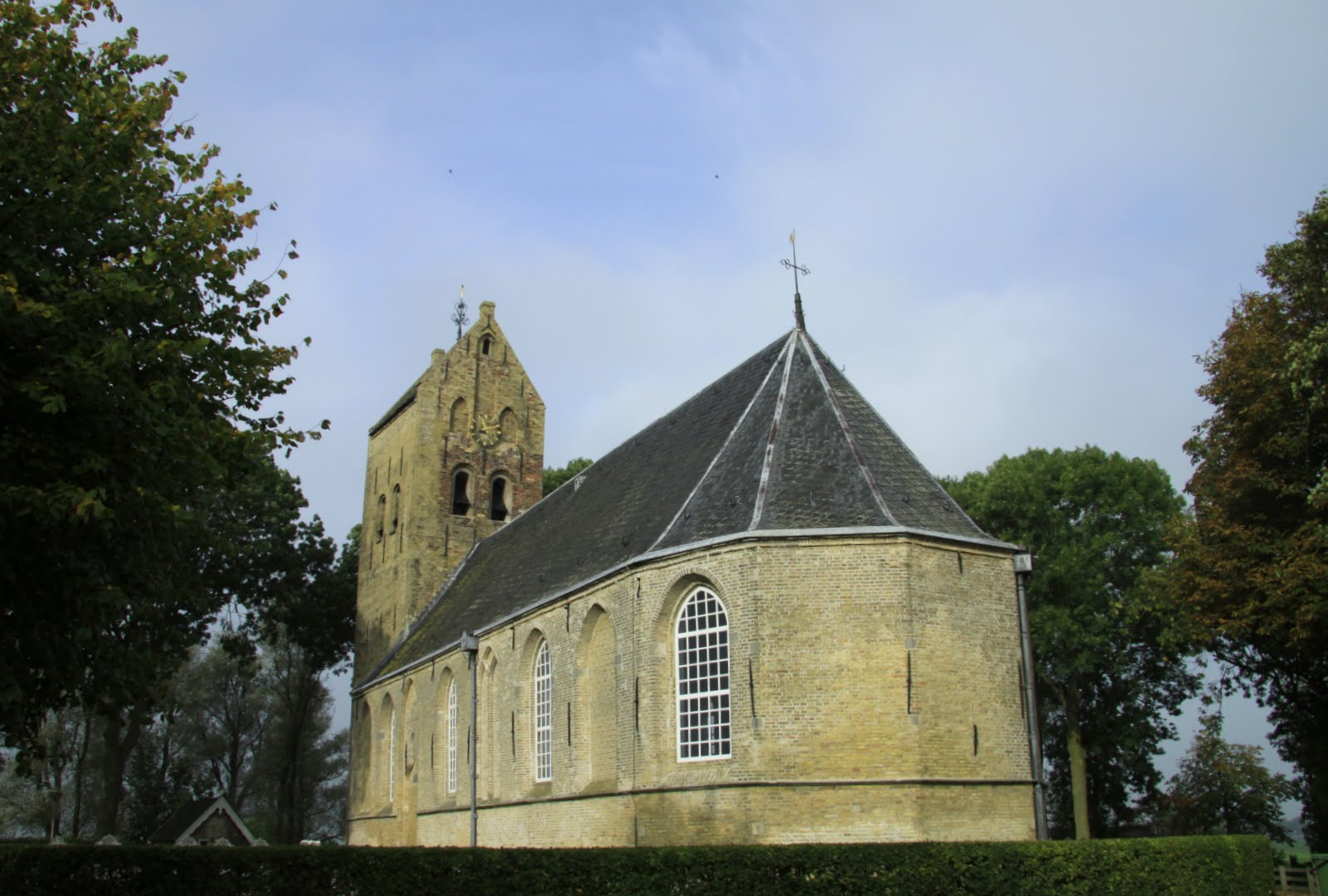
- St Gertrude's church

- Flag Coat of arms

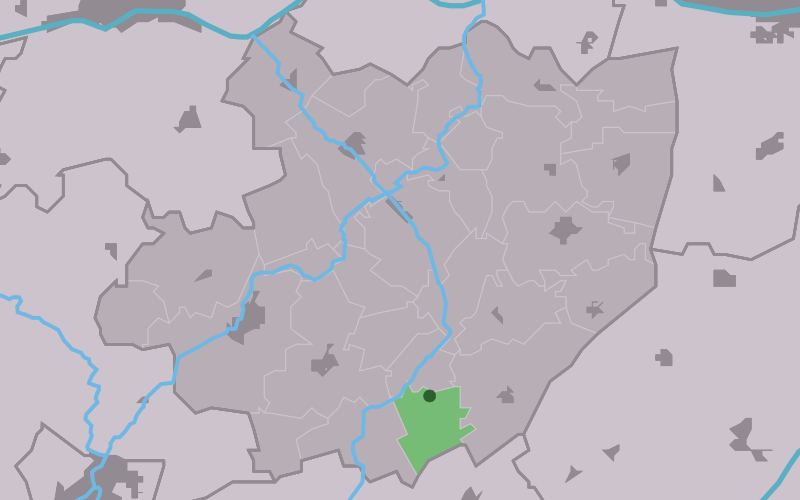
- Location in the former Littenseradiel municipality

- Location in the Netherlands Lutkewierum (Netherlands)
- Country: Netherlands
- Province: Friesland
- Municipality: Súdwest-Fryslân

Area
  - Total: 3.37 km^{2} (1.30 sq mi)
- Elevation: 0.5 m (1.6 ft)

Population (2021)
  - Total: 65
  - Density: 19/km^{2} (50/sq mi)
- Time zone: UTC+1 (CET)
  - Summer (DST): UTC+2 (CEST)
- Postal code: 8642
- Dialing code: 0515

Lytsewierrum (Dutch: Lutkewierum) is a small village in Súdwest-Fryslân municipality in the province of Friesland, the Netherlands. It had a population of around 68 in January 2017.

== History ==
The village was first mentioned in 1381 as Liticawerum, and means "little terp". Lytse (little) was added to distinguish between Grotewierum. Lytsewierrum is a terp (artificial living hill) village on the eastern tip of the former island of Easterein.

The Dutch Reformed church dates are burnt down in 1514, and rebuilt in 1557, and has colourful paintings on the ceiling in Art Deco style. The tower dates from the 15th century.

Lytsewierrum was home to 167 people in 1840. The village is located at a dead-end road (for cars), because Cornelis Rimmerts Faber, the grietman (predecessor of mayor) of Hennaarderadeel did not want a road through his lands. Before 2018, the village was part of the Littenseradiel municipality and before 1984 it belonged to Hennaarderadeel municipality.

== Gallery ==
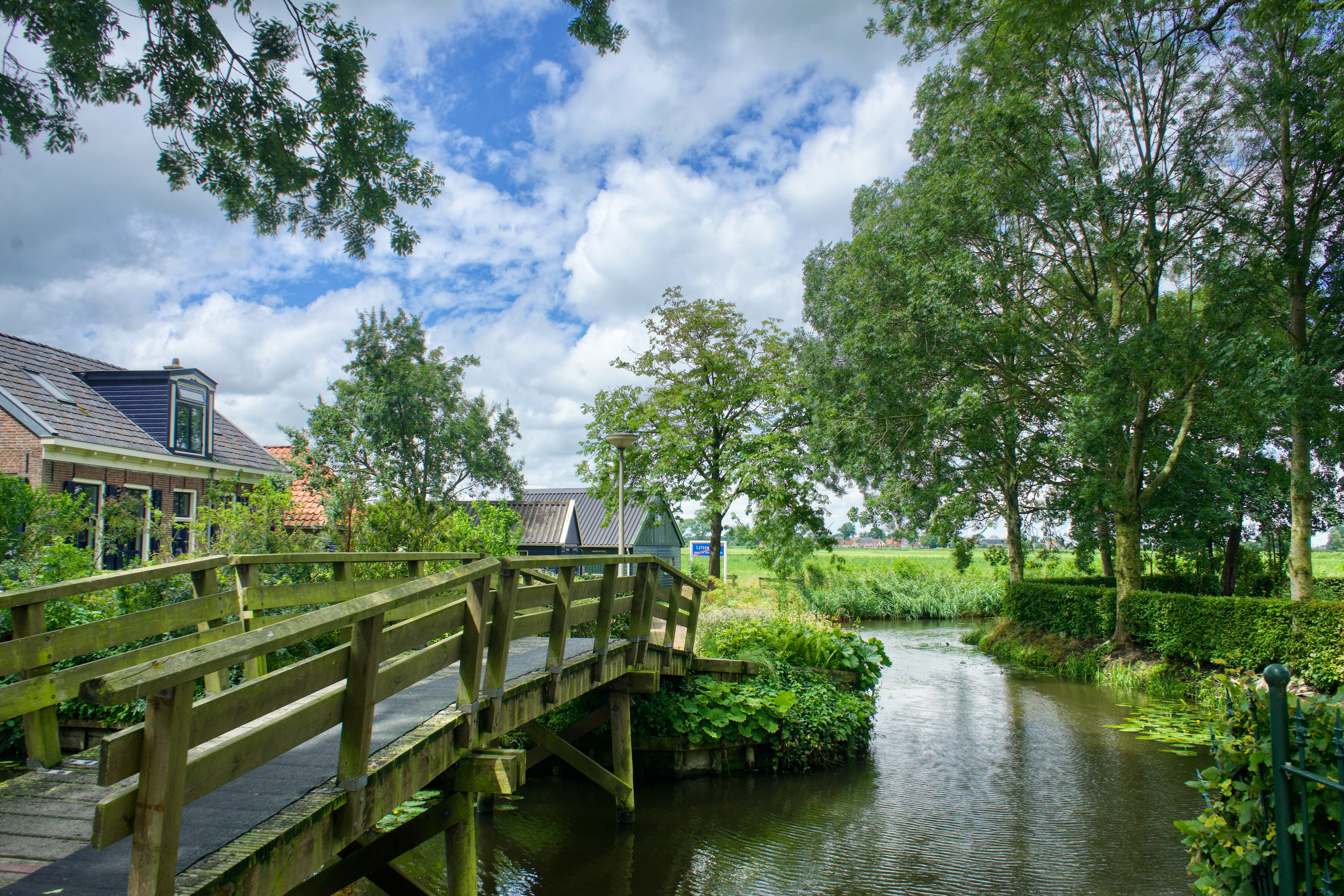
View on Lytsewierrum

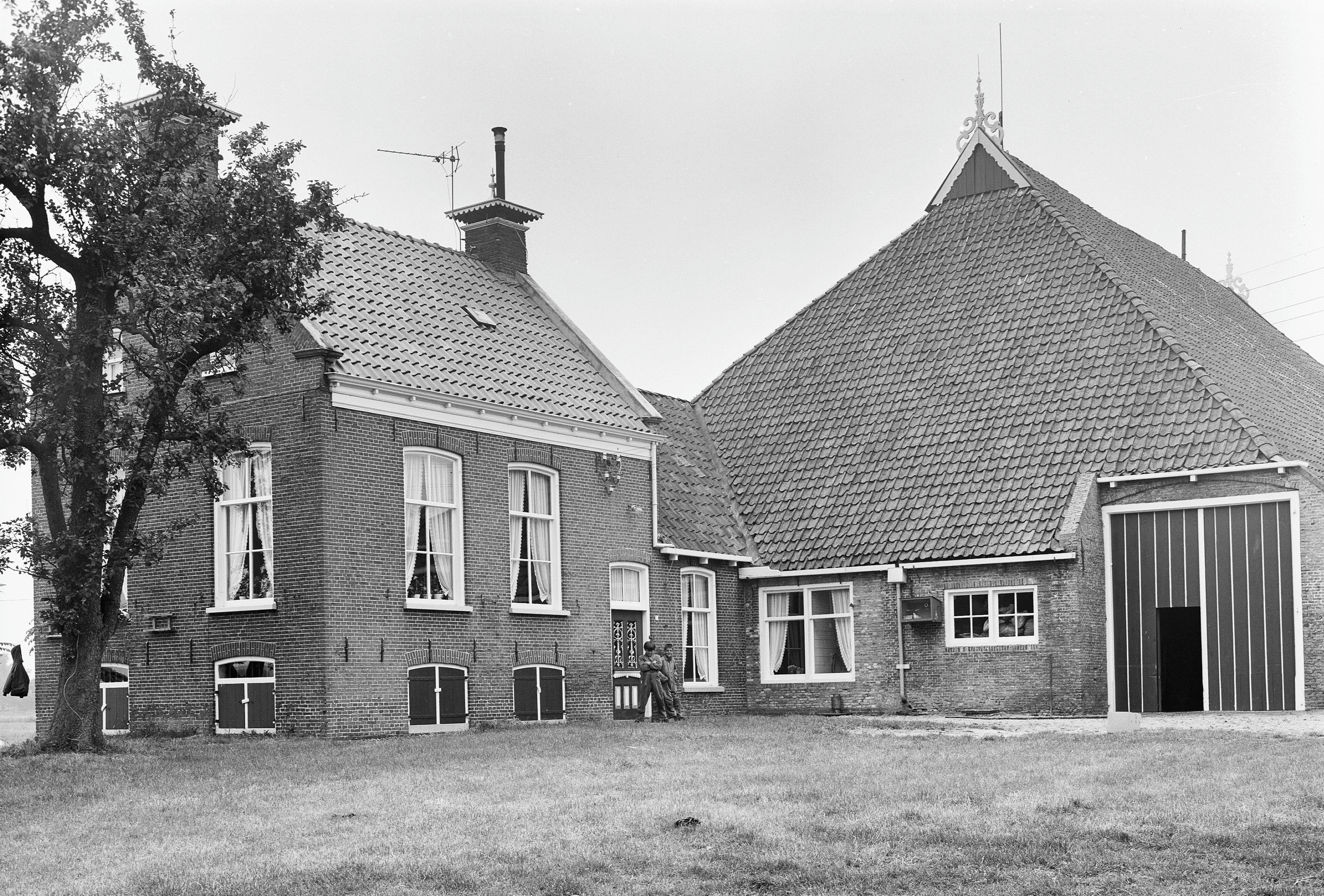
Farm in Lystewierrum
