= Littenseradiel =

Littenseradiel Littenseradeel
- Municipality
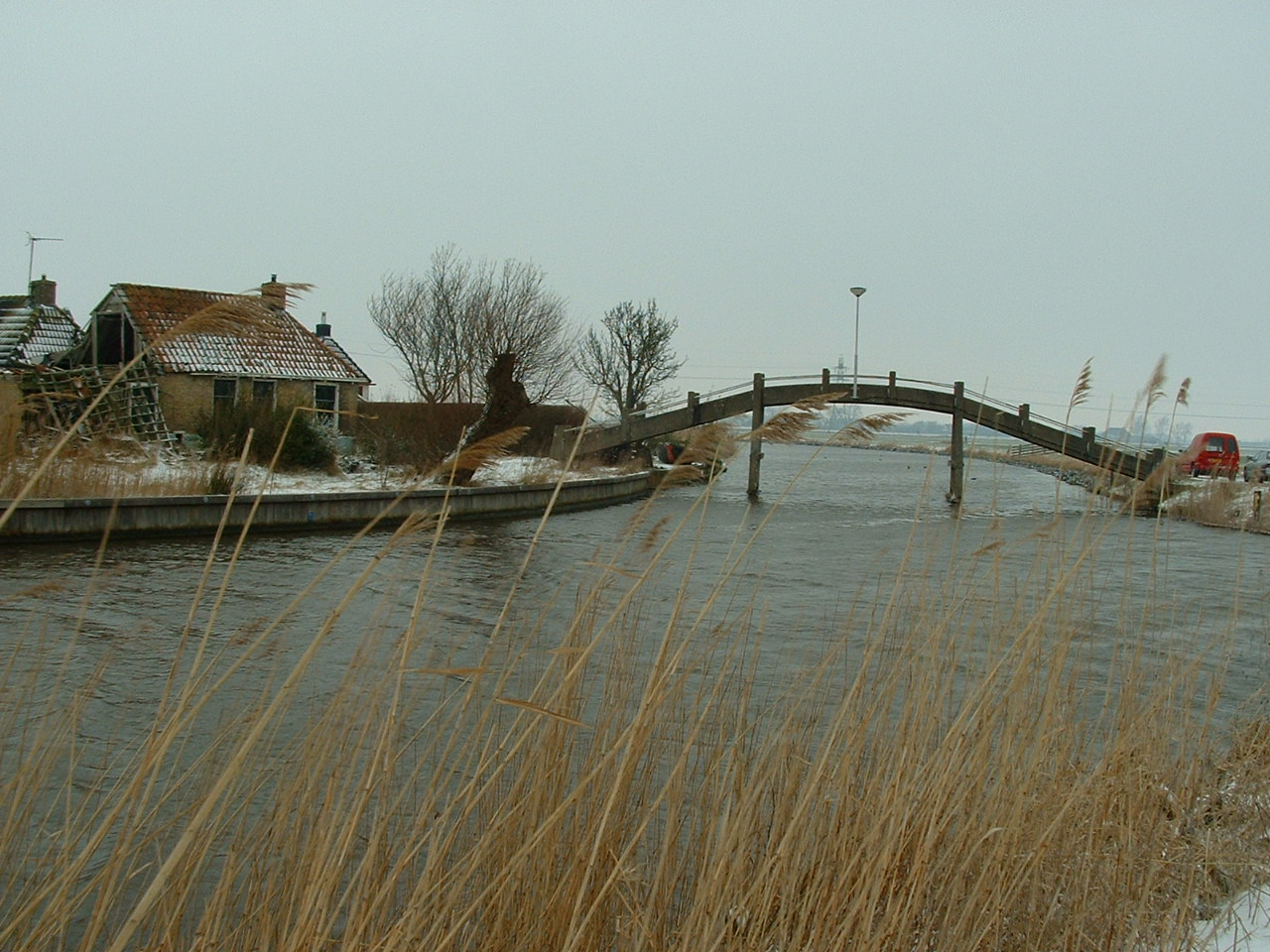
- Canal through Wjelsryp

- Flag Coat of arms

- Location in Friesland
- Coordinates: 53°7′N 5°35′E
- Country: Netherlands
- Province: Friesland
- Established: 1 January 1984

Government
  - Body: Municipal council
  - Mayor: Johanneke Liemburg (PvdA)

Area
  - Total: 132.64 km^{2} (51.21 sq mi)
  - Land: 130.75 km^{2} (50.48 sq mi)
  - Water: 1.89 km^{2} (0.73 sq mi)
- Elevation: 1 m (3.3 ft)

Population (January 2021)
  - Total: data missing
- Time zone: UTC+1 (CET)
  - Summer (DST): UTC+2 (CEST)
- Postcode: Parts of 8000 and 9000 range
- Area code: 0515, 0517, 058
- Website: www.littenseradiel.nl

Littenseradiel (West Frisian pronunciation: [ˈlɪtn̩səraˌdiəl]) is a former municipality in the northern Netherlands, known in Dutch as Littenseradeel (pronounced [ˈlɪtə(n)səraːˌdeːl]). The municipality was formed on 1 January 1984 by a merger of the former municipalities Baarderadeel and Hennaarderadeel. On 1 January 2018, the municipality was dissolved and its territory was split between three other municipalities: Waadhoeke, which was established that day, Leeuwarden and Súdwest-Fryslân.

== Population centers ==
Baaium, Baard, Bears, Boazum, Britswert, Easterlittens, Easterwierrum, Hidaard, Hilaard, Hinnaard, Húns, Iens, Itens, Jellum, Jorwert, Kûbaard, Leons, Lytsewierrum, Mantgum, Reahûs, Rien, Spannum, Waaksens, Weidum, Winsum, Wiuwert, Wjelsryp, Wommels.

=== Topography ===
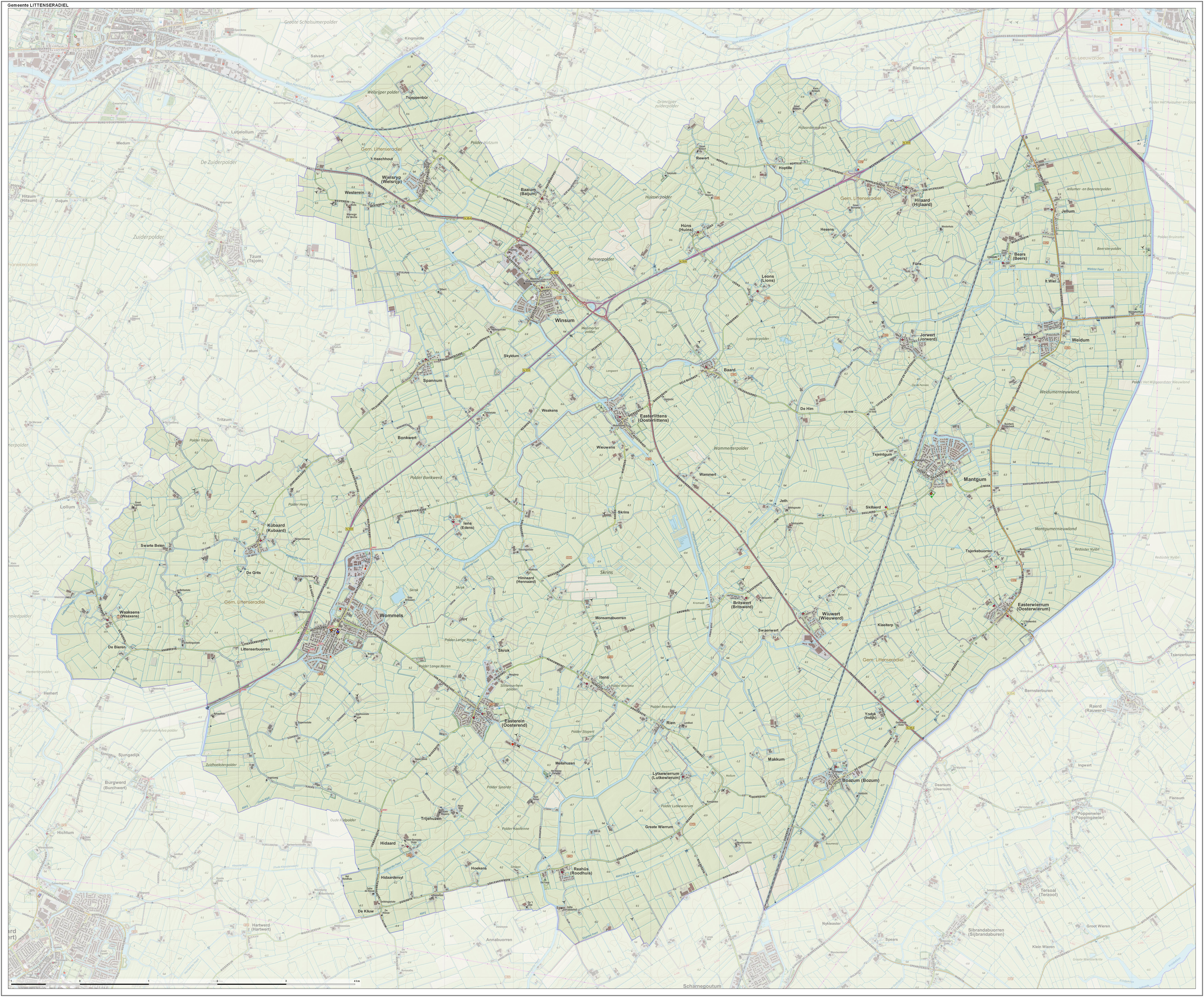

Dutch topographic map of the municipality of Littenseradiel, June 2015
