= Baarderadeel =

Coordinates: 53°8′N 5°41′E

Baarderadeel is a former municipality in the Dutch province of Friesland, southwest of Leeuwarden. Since 1984, the area has been a part of the municipality of Littenseradiel.

Some of the larger villages in Baarderadeel are Winsum, Mantgum, and Easterlittens.
