= Hennaarderadeel =

Coordinates: 53.1082°N 5.5872°E

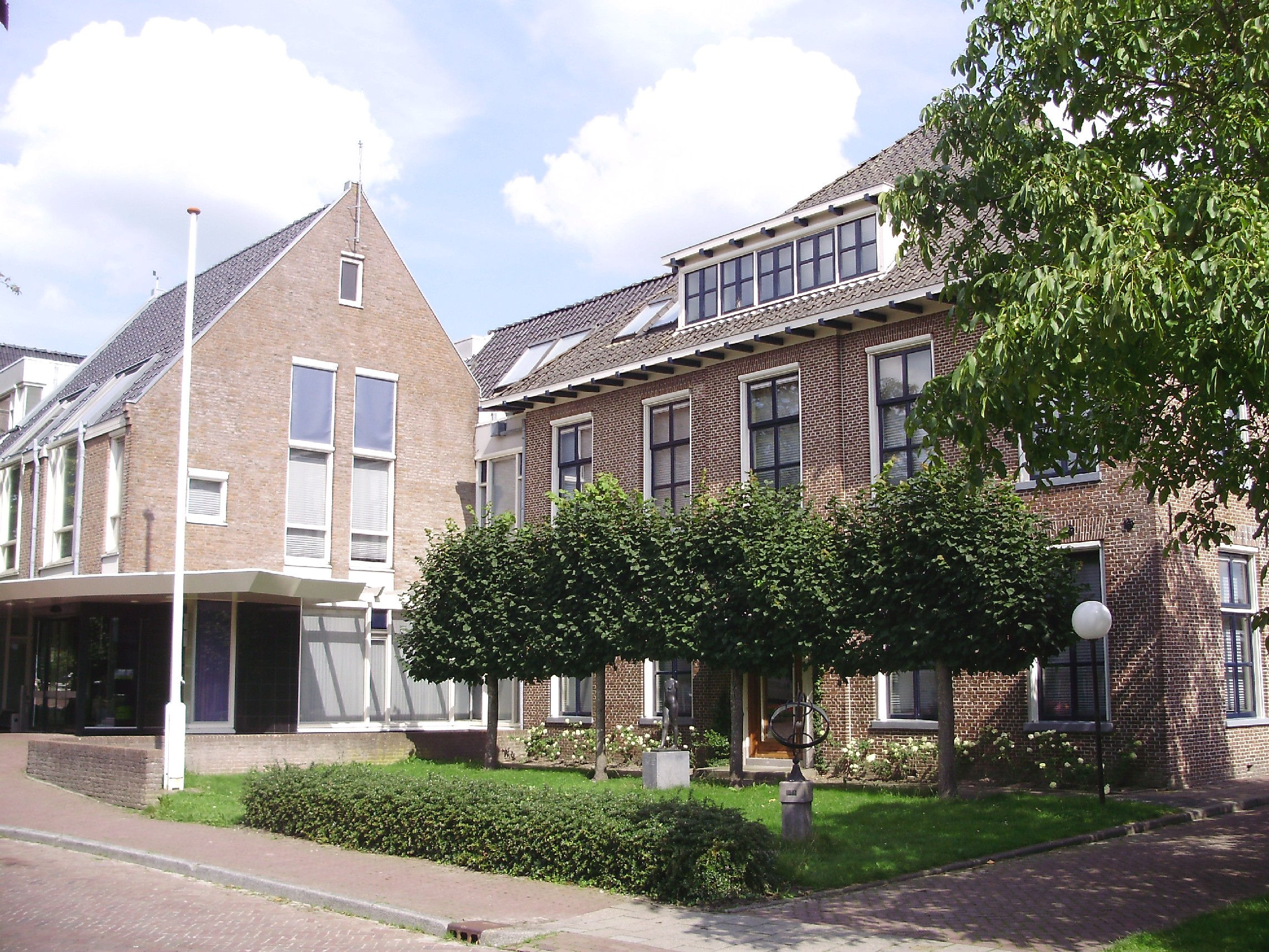
Hennaarderadeel’s town hall, before 1984, where it’s Littenseradiel’s town hall.

Hennaarderadeel (Dutch: Hennaarderadeel, Frisian: Hinnaarderadiel) is a former municipality in the Dutch province of Friesland, southwest of Leeuwarden. Located in the northern Netherlands, the area was known for its predominantly rural character and small villages. Since 1984, the area has been a part of the municipality of Littenseradiel. Some of the larger villages in Hennaarderadeel are Wommels and Easterein.

Hennaarderadeel was a former municipality in the Dutch province of Friesland. Hennaarderadeel was dissolved in 1984 and merged with several other municipalities to form the new municipality of Littenseradiel, which itself ceased to exist in 2018 as part of further municipal reorganization in Friesland.

== Geography and Location ==
Hennaarderadeel was situated in the central part of Friesland, bordered by other municipalities such as Baarderadeel to the north and Wymbritseradeel to the south. The area was characterized by flat, open landscapes typical of Friesland, with a mix of farmland, small canals, and rural settlements.

The municipality consisted of several villages and hamlets. Among the larger villages were Wommels, the administrative center, and Easterein. Other settlements included Hinnaard, Kûbaard, and Lens.

== History ==
Hennaarderadeel’s origins date back to medieval times, when it functioned as a grietenij (an administrative division unique to Friesland). The region was historically agrarian, with a focus on dairy farming and small-scale agriculture. Over time, Hennaarderadeel underwent gradual development, though it maintained its rural character.

In 1984, Hennaarderadeel, along with neighboring Baarderadeel and parts of other municipalities, was merged to create Littenseradiel. This restructuring aimed to improve administrative efficiency. Littenseradiel, in turn, was divided into the municipalities of Leeuwarden, Súdwest-Fryslân, and Waadhoeke in 2018 as part of a provincial initiative to streamline local governance.
