= List of windmills in Friesland (H–I) =

List of windmills in Friesland, Netherlands

A list of windmills in the Dutch province of Friesland, locations beginning H–I.

== H ==
Location	Name of mill	Type	Built	Notes	Photograph
Hallum	Genazareth; Kloosterpoldermolen; 53°17′06″N 5°49′14″E	Grondzeiler	1850		
Hallum	Vijfhuistermolen; Hoekstermolen; 53°18′16″N 5°46′25″E	Grondzeiler	1846	Dismantled 1999, re-erected at Burgwerd in 2000.	
Hallum	De Reiger; Sijtsma's Molen; 53°19′02″N 5°47′29″E	Stellingmolen	1848	Demolished 1927.	
Hallum	De Roos; 53°19′02″N 5°47′29″E		Before 1822	Burnt down 1848.	
Hallum	Eerste Zuidermeidpolder; 53°17′48″N 5°47′29″E	Grondzeiler	Before 1832	Demolished post-1927.	
Hallum	Minister Thorbecke; 53°18′14″N 5°46′41″E	Stellingmolen	1856	Demolished 1942/43.	
Hallum	Molen van Æde Hijkema; 53°17′33″N 5°47′39″E	Spinnenkopmolen	Before 1832	Demolished before 1850.	
Hallum	Molen van de Kerk; 53°18′15″N 5°49′08″E		Before 1832	Demolished before 1850.	
Hallum	Molen van Douwe Bosch; 53°17′58″N 5°48′22″E	Spinnenkopmolen	Before 1832	Demoished before 1850.	
Hallum	Molen van Gerben de Jong; 53°17′57″N 5°47′22″E	Spinnenkopmolen	Before 1832	Demolished before 1850.	
Hallum	Molen van Jacob Deinema; 53°17′19″N 5°48′05″E	Spinnenkopmolen	Before 1832	Demolished before 1850.	
Hallum	Molen van Klaas Bouma; 53°18′29″N 5°48′40″E		Before 1832	Demolished before 1850.	
Hallum	Molen van Oene Hogenbrug; 53°17′25″N 5°46′31″E	Before 1832	Demolished before 1850.		
Hallum	Molen van Pieter Vierstra; 53°17′07″N 5°49′00″E		Before 1832	Demolished before 1850.	
Hallum	Noordermeidpoldermolen; 53°18′16″N 5°49′29″E	Grondzeiler	1844	Demolished 1955.	
Hallum	Polder 1; 53°18′52″N 5°47′50″E		Before 1832	Demolished post-1850.	
Hallum	Polder 5; 53°17′46″N 5°48′16″E		Before 1832	Demolished post-1930.	
Hallum	Polder 6 Molen van der Velde; 53°17′35″N 5°48′55″E	Grondzeiler	Before 1832	Demolished 1927.	
Hallum	Polder 7; 53°17′28″N 5°49′14″E		Before 1832	Demolished post-1930.	
Hallum	Polder 10; 53°17′07″N 5°47′25″E		Before 1832	Demolished before 1930.	
Hallum	Polder 11; 53°17′48″N 5°46′11″E		Between 1832 and 1850	Demolished post-1929.	
Hallum	Polder 12; 53°18′01″N 5°46′18″E	Spinnenkopmolen	Before 1832	Demolished post-1929.	
Hallum	Polder van Froskepolle; 53°17′31″N 5°48′36″E	Spinnenkopmolen	Before 1832	Demolished post-1830.	
Hantum	De Hantumermolen; 53°21′26″N 5°57′47″E	Grondzeiler	1880		
Hantum	De Rooseboom; De Rozenboom; 53°21′49″N 5°58′33″E	Stellingmolen	1863	Demolished 1970.	
Hantum	Molen van Hantum	standerdmolen	Before 1580	Demolished 1639,	
Hantumerútbuorren	Polder bij Nijenhuis; 53°21′24″N 6°01′10″E		Between 1832 and 1850	Demolished post-1850.	
Hantumhuzen	De Rooseboom	Achtkantmolen	1863		
Harderwijk	Molen op het Bastion voor de Sneepoort; 52°20′48″N 5°36′59″E		Before 1669	Demolished before 1672.	
Harich	Hr. Valkeniers Poldermolen; 52°54′25″N 5°33′39″E		Between 1664 and 1712	Demolished before 1832.	
Harich	Kleine Poldermolen; 52°53′34″N 5°31′29″E		Before 1832	Demolished before 1929.	
Harich	Korenmolen van Harich; 52°53′45″N 5°34′33″E	standerdmolen	Before 1501	Demolished c.1746.	
Harich	Molen van Constantia Rengers; 52°54′27″N 5°34′14″E	Spinnenkopmolen	Before 1832	Demolished before 1850.	
Harich	Molen van Constantia Rengers; 52°54′25″N 5°33′35″E	Spinnenkopmolen	Before 1832	Demolished before 1850.	
Harich	Molen van Onco van Swinderen; 52°54′14″N 5°33′10″E	Spinnenkopmolen	Before 1832	Demolished post-1850.	
Harich	Molen van Rinke Boukema; 52°54′25″N 5°33′43″E	Spinnenkopmolen	Before 1832	Demolished before 1850.	
Harich	Nieuwegspoldermolen; De Onderneming; 52°52′33″N 5°30′46″E	Stellingmolen	1843	Demolished 1927.	
Harich	Polder Beoosten de Bokkelaan; 52°53′58″N 5°32′30″E	Grondzeiler	Before 1832	Demolished before 1929.	
Harich	Polder Bergstra; 52°54′18″N 5°33′06″E		Before 1832	Demolished before 1929.	
Harich	Polder E 52°54′29″N 5°33′19″E	Spinnenkopmolen	Before 1832	Demolished before 1929.	
Harich	Polder Het Stiens; 52°54′40″N 5°33′34″E		1832	Demolished before 1929.	
Harich	Westerender Poldermolen; 52°53′10″N 5°30′43″E		Before 1832	Demolished before 1929.	
Harlingen	Gortmolen van C. S. Tammes; 53°11′00″N 5°25′43″E	Standerdmolen	1695	Demolished 1729.	
Harlingen	Gortmolen van C. S. Timmes; 53°11′00″N 5°25′45″E	Standerdmolen	1698	Demolished 1753.	
Harlingen	Beischatsmolen; 53°10′07″N 5°25′20″E	Wip stellingmolen	1662	Burnt down 1781.	
Harlingen	Bildpoortsmolen; 53°10′39″N 5°25′05″E	Standerdmolen	1580	Blown down c.1626.	
Harlingen	Bildpoortsmolen; 53°10′40″N 5°25′01″E	Standerdmolen	1626	Blown down 1858.	
Harlingen	De Arend; 53°09′49″N 5°25′17″E	Stellingmolen	1779	Demolished 1945.	
Harlingen	De Bazuin; 53°10′40″N 5°25′01″E	Stellingmolen	1859	Demolished 1944.	
Harlingen	De Blauwe Molen; De Noordsche Hengst; De Noorsche Hingst; 53°09′53″N 5°25′03″E	Stellingmolen	Before 1653	Moved to Jirnsum 1799.	
Harlingen	De Eendracht; Eendragt; 53°09′53″N 5°25′15″E	Stellingmolen	1642	Burnt down 1901.	
Harlingen	De Halinger Oliemolen; 53°09′35″N 5°25′07″E	Stellingmolen	1691	Demolished 1915.	
Harlingen	De Hoop; 53°10′10″N 5°25′02″E		1714	Demolished 1802.	
Harlingen	De Hoop; 53°10′22″N 5°26′55″E	Stellingmolen	Before 1832	Demolished 1908.	
Harlingen	De Leeuw; 53°10′18″N 5°24′51″E	Stellingmolen	1852	Burnt down 1898.	
Harlingen	De Leeuw; 53°10′19″N 5°25′25″E	Stellingmolen	1845	Moved within Harlingen 1852.	
Harlingen	De Leeuwarder Oliemolen; 53°09′34″N 5°25′12″E	Stellingmolen	Between 1715 and 1722	Burnt down 1746/47.	
Harlingen	De Leeuw; Molen van Friso; 53°10′18″N 5°24′51″E	Stellingmolen	1899	Burnt down 1907.	
Harlingen	De Olde Molen; 53°10′24″N 5°25′10″E	Standerdmolen	Before 1543	Demolished c.1605.	
Harlingen	De Oude Pelmolen; 53°09′36″N 5°25′05″E	Grondzeiler	1689	Moved within Harlingen between 1694 and 1706.	
Harlingen	De Oude Pelmolen; 53°09′44″N 5°25′14″E	Grondzeiler	Between 1694 and 1706	Burnt down 1765.	
Harlingen	De Paltrok; De Paltrog; De Hoop; 53°10′10″N 5°25′02″E	Paltrokmolen	1855	Demolished 1894.	
Harlingen	De Phenix; 53°10′07″N 5°25′20″E	Stellingmolen	1782	Moved to Dokkum 1897.	
Harlingen	De Standvastigheid; De Vastigheid; 53°09′59″N 5°25′16″E	Stellingmolen	1779	Demolished 1934.	
Harlingen	De Swarte Molen; De Twee Gebroeders; 53°10′02″N 5°25′04″E	Wip stellingmolen	1644	Demolished c.1895.	
Harlingen	De Valk; 53°10′03″N 5°25′20″E		1644	Demolished 1847.	
Harlingen	De Valk; 53°10′03″N 5°25′20″E	Stellingmolen	1847	Demolished 1852, base demolished 1886.	
Harlingen	De Vrede; 53°09′48″N 5°25′21″E	Stellingmolen	1818	Demolished 1918.	
Harlingen	De Zeemunnik; 53°09′36″N 5°25′05″E		1710	Demolished c.1811.	
Harlingen	53°10′19″N 5°26′16″E		1701	Burnt down 1739.	
Harlingen	Het Fortuin; 53°10′06″N 5°25′03″E	Stellingmolen	1779	Demolished 1929.	
Harlingen	Houtlust; 53°10′21″N 5°27′09″E		1663	Demolished before 1749.	
Harlingen	Houtlust; Landmanslust; 53°10′21″N 5°27′09″E	Stellingmolen	Before 1749	Burnt down 1879.	
Harlingen	Houtzaagmolen bij het Beitzegat; 53°09′33″N 5°25′20″E		Between 1632 and 1651	Demolished between 1693 and 1700.	
Harlingen	Houtzaagmolen buiten Franeker poort 53°10′29″N 5°25′40″E	Wip stellingmolen	1616	Demolished between 1633 and 1638.	
Harlingen	Houtzaagmolen op Grettingabuurt; 53°10′20″N 5°25′42″E	Wip stellingmolen	1637	Demolished 1753.	
Harlingen	IJslumbuursterpolder; 53°10′11″N 5°28′45″E		Before 1832	Demolished c.1918.	
Harlingen	IJslumbuursterpolder; 53°10′02″N 5°28′05″E	Spinnenkopmolen	Before 1832	Demolished post-1864.	
Harlingen	Jan Ruierdts Molen; 53°10′10″N 5°25′02″E	Wip stellingmolen	1658	Demolished post-1741.	
Harlingen	Java; 53°09′56″N 5°25′15″E	Stellingmolen	1810	Burnt down 1860.	
Harlingen	Kerkpoorstmolen; 53°10′16″N 5°25′17″E	Standerdmolen	Before 1606	Demolished 1786.	
Harlingen	Kleine Zaagmolen van Simon Boon; 53°10′21″N 5°26′53″E		1827	Demolished between 1834 and 1836.	
Harlingen	Korenmolen aan de Heiligeweg; 53°10′28″N 5°25′17″E	Standerdmolen	1572	Moved within Harlinged after 1580.	
Harlingen	Korenmolen aan de Rommelhaven; 53°10′31″N 5°25′16″E	Standerdmolen	Before 1543	Probably moved within Harlingen before 1572.	
Harlingen	Korenmolen bij het Blauwhuis; 53°10′26″N 5°24′43″E	Standerdmolen	1572	Moved within Harlingen 1671.	
Harlingen	Molen van de Algemene Begraafplaats; 53°10′42″N 5°25′18″E	Tjasker	Before 1875	Demolished c.1910.	
Harlingen	Molen van de Harlinger IJsvereniging; 53°10′00″N 5°25′31″E	Spinnenkopmolen	1895	Demolished post-1928.	
Harlingen	Molen van Gauke Hengst; 53°09′38″N 5°26′34″E	Spinnenkopmolen	Before 1832	Demolished before 1852.	
Harlingen	Molen van Jorrit Jorritsma; 53°10′08″N 5°26′34″E		Before 1832	Demolished before 1850.	
Harlingen	Molen van Pieter Cats; 53°10′37″N 5°27′40″E		Before 1832	Demolished post-1850.	
Harlingen	Molen van Sjouke de Jong; 53°09′38″N 5°28′05″E	Spinnenkopmolen	Before 1832	Demolished before 1850.	
Harlingen	Molen van Van der Stok; 53°10′05″N 5°25′16″E	Wipmolen	1774	Demolished 1793.	
Harlingen	Molen van Wijbe Jorritsma; 53°10′27″N 5°28′56″E	Spinnenkopmolen	Before 1832	Demolished before 1879.	
Harlingen	Nieuwe Pelmolen; De Hoop; 53°09′45″N 5°25′15″E	Stellingmolen	1699	Burnt down 1839.	
Harlingen	Noordermolen; 53°10′41″N 5°25′15″E	Standerdmolen	1671	Demolished between 1822 and 1827.	
Harlingen	Noorderooster Mollen; Franekerpoorts Molen; 53°10′35″N 5°25′26″E	Standerdmolen	1566	Demolished 1683.	
Harlingen	Papiermolen; 53°11′00″N 5°26′19″E	Wipmolen	1610	Demolished between 1658 and 1694.	
Harlingen	Papiermolen op het Ameland			Demolished before 1608.	
Harlingen	Papiermolen van Du Bois; 53°10′02″N 5°25′11″E	Wip stellingmolen	1600	Demolished post-1676.	
Harlingen	Pelmolen; 53°09′56″N 5°25′15″E		1698	Burnt down 1808.	
Harlingen	Pelmolen bij de Franeker Poort; 53°10′35″N 5°25′26″E		1689	Probably moved within Harlingen 1695.	
Harlingen	Polder 1; 53°09′28″N 5°27′36″E	Spinnenkopmolen	Before 1832	Demolished post-1850.	
Harlingen	Polder 2; 53°09′26″N 5°27′55″E		Before 1832	Demolished post-1850.	
Harlingen	Polder3; 53°09′06″N 5°28′29″E		Before 1832	Demolished before 1850.	
Harlingen	Polder 5; 53°10′46″N 5°26′14″E		Before 1832	Demolished post-1850.	
Harlingen	Polder 6 Midlumerpolder; 53°10′42″N 5°26′56″E	Grondzeiler	Before 1832	Demolished 1922.	
Harlingen	Polder 7; 53°10′42″N 5°27′25″E	Spinnenkop stellingmolen	1857	Demolished 1922.	
Harlingen	Polder 7 Polder de Wier of Dikkinga; 53°09′17″N 5°24′57″E		Before 1852	Demolished between 1902 and 1928.	
Harlingen	Polder 8; 53°10′44″N 5°27′55″E		Before 1832	Demolished before 1928.	
Harlingen	Polder Gratinga; 53°10′55″N 5°27′45″E		Before 1832	Demolished before 1928.	
Harlingen	Polder Groot Ungabuurt; 53°10′23″N 5°28′54″E		Before 1873	Demolished 1912.	
Harlingen	Rapenburgermolen; Nieuwe Molen; 53°10′20″N 5°25′27″E	Standerdmolen	Before 1608	Demolished c. 1728.	
Harlingen	Ungabuursterpoldermolen; 53°10′37″N 5°28′46″E	Spinnenkopmolen	Before 1932	Demolished before 1928.	
Harlingen	Verfmolen van Johannes Spannenburg; 53°10′02″N 5°25′11″E		1781	Demolished 1821.	
Harlingen	Vierkantspoldermolen; Almenumerpoldermolen; 53°09′53″N 5°26′29″E	Grondzeiler	1839	Demolished 1914.	
Harlingen	Weidemolen van De Wit; 53°10′13″N 5°28′10″E	Spinnenkopmolen	Before 1832	Demolished c.1880.	
Harlingen	Weidemolen van Gratema; 53°09′49″N 5°27′07″E	Tjasker	Before 1832	Demolished 1911.	
Harlingen	Weidemolen van Mesdag; 53°10′25″N 5°28′24″E	Spinnenkopmolen	Before 1832	Demolished c. 1860.	
Harlingen	Weidemolen van Popta; 53°10′06″N 5°27′21″E	Spinnenkopmolen	Before 1832	Demolished c.1913.	
Harlingen	Weidemolen van Popta; 53°10′09″N 5°27′22″E	Tjasker	Before 1832	Demolished c.1913.	
Harlingen	Weidemolen van Sijbrand Spannenburg; 53°09′16″N 5°24′57″E	Weidemolen	Before 1832	Demolished post-1850.	
Harlingen	Weidemolen van Tetroode; 53°10′06″N 5°25′53″E	Weidemolen	Before 1832	Demolished before 1850.	
Harlingen	Westerpoldermolen; 53°11′25″N 5°26′40″E	Grondzeiler	Before 1832	Demolished before 1850.	
Harlingen	Zuiderpoortsmolen; 53°10′18″N 5°24′51″E		Before 1736	Demolished 1852.	
Harlingen	Zuiderpoortsmolen; Zuidermolen; 53°10′18″N 5°24′51″E	Standerdmolen	1598	Demolished 1852.	
Harlingen	Zwarte Molenpolder; 53°09′43″N 5°27′27″E		Before 1832	Demolished c.1915.	
Hartwerd	De Oegekloostermolen; 53°03′59″N 5°33′35″E	Spinnenkopmolen	c.1830		
Hartwerd	Windmotor Hartwerd; 53°04′37″N 5°31′42″E	Iron windpump	1930		
Hartwerd	Polder 378; Molen van Kramer; 53°04′58″N 5°34′40″E	Spinnenkopmolen	Before 1832	Demolished c.1964.	
Hartwerd	Polder 379; 53°04′37″N 5°35′07″E	Spinnenkopmolen	Before 1832	Demolished post-1930.	
Hartwerd	Polder 380; Molen van J. T. Teemstra; Oude Klooste; Oudeklooster; 53°04′37″N 5°35′17″E	Spinnenkopmolen	Before 1832	Blown down 1957.	
Hartwerd	Polder 380a Molen bij boerderij Vijf Akker; 53°04′23″N 5°35′18″E	Spinnenkopmolen	Before 1599	Demolished post-1850.	
Hartwerd	Polder 382; 53°04′04″N 5°35′26″E	Spinnenkopmolen	Before 1832	Demolished post-1930.	
Hartwerd	Polder 384; 53°03′57″N 5°34′37″E	Spinnenkopmolen	Before 1832	Demolished post-1930.	
Hartwerd	Polder 385; 53°04′35″N 5°34′20″E	Spinnenkopmolen	Before 1832	Demolished post-1850.	
Hartwerd	Polder 385a 53°04′33″N 5°34′13″E	Spinnenkopmolen	Before 1832	Demolished post-1850.	
Hartwerd	Polder 386; 53°04′55″N 5°34′39″E	Spinnenkopmolen	Before 1832	Demolished between 1943 and 1957.	
Hartwerd	Polder 387; 53°04′57″N 5°34′20″E	Spinnenkopmolen	Before 1832	Demolished post-1930.	
Hartwerd	Polder 396; 53°04′20″N 5°32′46″E	Spinnenkopmolen	Before 1832	Demolished 1950.	
Hartwerd	Polder 397; 53°04′27″N 5°33′42″E	Spinnenkopmolen	Before 1832	Demolished post-1930.	
Hartwerd	Polder 397a 53°04′02″N 5°34′05″E		Before 1832	Demolished post-1850.	
Hartwerd	Polder 398a 53°03′57″N 5°33′53″E	]Spinnenkopmolen	Before 1832	Demolished between 1943 and 1950.	
Hartwerd	Polder 399; 53°03′48″N 5°33′35″E	Spinnenkopmolen	1780	Demolished post-1950.	
Hartwerd	Polder 400; 53°03′47″N 5°32′56″E	Spinnenkopmolen	Before 1873	Demolished before 1929/	
Hartwerd	Molen van Anne Klaver; 53°03′47″N 5°33′29″E	Spinnenkopmolen	Before 1832	Demolished before 1850.	
Hartwerd	Molen van Haitzes Lam; 53°04′26″N 5°33′24″E	Spinnenkopmolen	Before 1832	Demolished before 1850.	
Hartwerd	Molen van Marten Stiensma; 53°03′52″N 5°32′55″E	Spinnenkopmolen	Before 1832	Demolished before 1850.	
Hartwerd	Molen van Oene Oneides; 53°03′46″N 5°33′09″E	Spinnenkopmolen	Before 1832	Demolished before 1850.	
Hartwerd	Molen van Sikko Poptha; 53°03′54″N 5°34′15″E	Spinnenkopmolen	Before 1832	Demolished before 1850.	
Haskerdijken	Molen van der Kerk van Westermeer; 53°00′22″N 5°51′50″E		Before 1832		
Haskerdijken	Molen van Johannes Bottema; 53°01′35″N 5°51′38″E		Before 1832	Demolished before 1850.	
Haskerdijken	Molen van Jr. V. L. Vegelin van Claerbergen; 53°01′31″N 5°51′44″E	Spinnenkopmolen	Before 1832	Demolished before 1850.	
Haskerdijken	Molen van Jr. V. L. Vegelin van Claerbergen; 52°59′57″N 5°52′40″E		Before 1832	Demolished before 1850.	
Haskerdijken	Molen van Jr. V. L. Vegelin van Clarebergen; 53°00′25″N 5°52′35″E		Before 1832	Demolished before 1850.	
Haskerdijken	Molen van U. A. Wielinga Huber; 53°01′35″N 5°51′29″E		Before 1832	Demolished before 1850.	
Haskerdijken	Polder 116a 53°01′47″N 5°51′48″E		Before 1832	Demolished before 1924.	
Haskerdijken	Polder 119; 53°01′15″N 5°52′37″E		Before 1877	Demolished before 1924.	
Haskerdijken	Polder 119a 53°01′10″N 5°52′30″E		Before 1832	Demolished before 1877/	
Haskerdijken	Polder 120; 53°01′20″N 5°51′49″E		Before 1877	Demolished before 1924.	
Haskerdijken	Polder 121; 53°01′34″N 5°51′15″E		Before 1832	Demolished before 1924.	
Haskerdijken	Polder 122; 53°01′33″N 5°51′11″E		Before 1832	Demolished before 1924.	
Haskerdijken	Polder 123a 53°00′55″N 5°52′33″E		Before 1832	Demolished between 1850 and 1877.	
Haskerdijken	Polder 123b 53°00′54″N 5°52′39″E		Before 1832	Demolished between 1850 and 1877.	
Haskerdijken	Polder 125; 52°59′18″N 5°53′07″E	Spinnenkopmolen	1877	Demolished before 1928.	
Haskerdijken	Polder 127; Groote Schar; Grooteschar; 52°59′53″N 5°53′42″E			Demolished post-1908.	
Haskerdijken	Polder A 53°00′30″N 5°52′53″E	Grondzeiler	Before 1877	Demolished 1929.	
Haskerdijken	Polder B 53°00′22″N 5°51′52″E	Spinnenkopmolen	Before 1877	Demolished post-1877.	
Haskerdijken	Polder Bb; 53°00′46″N 5°51′42″E		Before 1832	Demolished before 1850.	
Haskerdijken	Polder C 53°00′16″N 5°52′18″E		Before 1832	Demolished post-1930.	
Haskerdijken	Polder D 53°00′18″N 5°52′37″E		Before 1832	Demolished post-1850.	
Haskerdijken	Polder E 52°59′59″N 5°52′23″E		Before 1832	Demolished before 1928.	
Haskerhorne	Polder 42; 52°56′58″N 5°50′27″E	Spinnenkopmolen	1854	Demolished post-1957.	
Haskerhorne	Polder 43; 52°57′07″N 5°50′41″E	Spinnenkopmolen	Before 1832	Demolished before 1940.	
Haskerhorne	Polder 44; Haskerhornerpoldermolen; 52°57′32″N 5°50′33″E	Grondzeiler	Before 1832	Demolished c. 1908.	
Haskerhorne	Polder 44a 52°57′34″N 5°50′15″E		Between 1850 and 1864	Demolished before 1877.	
Haskerhorne	Polder 45; 52°57′32″N 5°49′56″E		Between 1850 and 1877	Demolished before 1929.	
Haskerhorne	Polder 46; Haskerhornsterpoldermolen; 52°57′56″N 5°50′26″E		Before 1877	Demolished before 1908.	
Haskerhorne	Polder 47; Wilderhornsterpolder; 52°58′36″N 5°50′14″E		1716	Demolished between 1850 and 1929.	
Haskerhorne	Molen van Jan Schokker; 52°56′49″N 5°50′36″E	Spinnenkopmolen	Before 1832	Demolished before 1850.	
Haule	Polder 17; 53°01′50″N 6°19′12″E		1877	Demolished before 1923.	
Haule	Weperpoldermolen; Hauler Veenpoldermolen; 53°01′30″N 6°18′51″E	Grondzeiler	1853	Moved 1870.	
Haulerwijk	53°03′19″N 6°21′37″E		Before 1850	Demolished post-1864.	
Haulerwijk	Molen van Ottens; 53°03′54″N 6°19′47″E	Stellingmolen	1884	Demolished 1920.	
Haulerwijk	Molen van Van der Wal; 53°03′58″N 6°19′10″E	Stellingmolen	1853	Demolished 1929.	
Heeg	De Hoop; 52°58′05″N 5°36′07″E	Stellingmolen	c.1829	Demolished c.1900.	
Heeg	Polder 235; 52°57′33″N 5°37′12″E	Spinnenkopmolen	Before 1832	Demolished post-1930.	
Heeg	Polder 236; 52°57′41″N 5°37′11″E	Grondzeiler	Before 1832	Demolished post-1930.	
Heeg	Polder 237; 52°57′56″N 5°37′35″E	Grondzeiler	Before 1832	Demolished post-1930.	
Heeg	Polder 238; 52°57′53″N 5°36′18″E	Grondzeiler	Before 1832	Demolished 1931.	
Heeg	Polder 239; 52°58′03″N 5°35′53″E	Spinnenkopmolen	Before 1832	Demolished post-1930.	
Heeg	Polder 240; Molen bij de Hoarneboersfeart; 52°58′05″N 5°35′12″E	Grondzeiler		Demolished before 1927.	
Heeg	Polder 241; 52°58′07″N 5°34′54″E	Grondzeiler	1850	Demolished post-1930.	
Heeg	Polder 242; 52°58′00″N 5°34′29″E	Grondzeiler	Before 1851	Demolished 1927.	
Heeg	Polder 243; 52°58′00″N 5°34′27″E	Spinnenkopmolen	Before 1850	Demolished 1927.	
Heeg	Polder 244; 52°58′02″N 5°34′05″E	Spinnenkopmolen	Before 1832	Demolished post-1850.	
Heeg	Polder 250; 52°58′09″N 5°33′35″E		Before 1718	Demolished before 1930.	
Heeg	Polder 251; 52°58′11″N 5°34′59″E	Spinnenkopmolen	Before 1832	Demolished c.1910.	
Heeg	Polder 251a 52°58′29″N 5°35′15″E	Tjasker		Demolished c.1910.	
Heeg	Polder 252; Hofsteepolermolen; Van Ommenspoldermolen; 52°58′11″N 5°35′47″E	Grondzeiler	Before 1832	Demolished before 1930.	
Heeg	Polder 253; De Witte Muonts; 52°58′14″N 5°36′57″E	Grondzeiler	1850	Demolished c. 1930.	
Heeg	Polder 253a 52°58′06″N 5°36′36″E		Before 1832	Demolished post-1930.	
Heeg	Polder 256; Lytshúster Muonts; 52°58′40″N 5°36′34″E	Grondzeiler	Before 1832	Demolished 1928/29.	
Heeg	Polder 257; 52°58′44″N 5°36′04″E	Grondzeiler	Before 1832	Demolished post-1930.	
Heeg	Polder 258; 52°58′23″N 5°36′13″E	Spinnenkopmolen	Before 1832	Demolished post-1930.	
Heeg	Polder 259; Molen van Mebius Hettinga; 52°58′51″N 5°35′40″E	Grondzeiler	1832	Moved to Hickory Corners, Michigan, United States 1927.	
Heeg	Polder 260; 52°58′53″N 5°35′39″E	Spinnenkopmolen	Before 1832	Demolished post-1930.	
Heeg	Polder 261; Molen van de Flappers; 52°58′56″N 5°35′23″E	Grondzeiler	1832	Demolished before 1932.	
Heeg	Polder 262; 52°59′01″N 5°34′54″E	Grondzeiler	Before 1832	Demolished post-1830.	
Heeg	Polder 262b 52°59′07″N 5°34′29″E		Before 1832	Demolished before 1850.	
Heeg			Before 1511	Demolished post-1740.	
Heeg	Molen van Anne Knossen; 52°58′04″N 5°34′37″E		Before 1832	Demolished before 1850.	
Heeg	Molen van Feike Franken; 52°58′01″N 5°34′28″E	Spinnenkopmolen	Before 1832	Demolished before 1850.	
Heeg	Molen van Folkert Graafsma; 52°58′56″N 5°35′23″E	Spinnenkopmolen	Before 1832		
Heeg	Molen van Haring Nauta; 52°58′05″N 5°35′12″E	Spinnenkopmolen	Before 1832		
Heeg	Molen van Hendrik Fortuin; 52°57′59″N 5°34′58″E		Before 1832	Demolished before 1850.	
Heeg	Molen van Ids Bergsma; 52°58′10″N 5°36′44″E		Before 1832	Demolished before 1850.	
Heeg	Molen van Jan Attema; 52°58′51″N 5°35′40″E	Spinnenkopmolen	Before 1832	Demolished post-1900.	
Heeg	Molen van Klaas Hettinga; 52°58′08″N 5°33′44″E	Grondzeiler	Before 1832	Demolished between 1900 and 1929.	
Heeg	Molen van Sjouke Huitema; 52°58′11″N 5°35′47″E	Spinnenkopmolen	Before 1832		
Heerenveen	Welgelegen; Tjepkema's Molen; 52°57′49″N 5°55′07″E	Stellingmolen	1849		
Heerenveen	Het Fortuin	Achtkantmolen	1805	Moved to Hankate, Overijssel, 1892. Molendatabase (in Dutch); De Hollandsche Molen (in Dutch)	
Heerenveen	52°58′13″N 5°54′40″E				
Heerenveen	Bandster Molen; 52°58′04″N 5°54′44″E	Standerdmolen	1481	Demolished 1763.	
Heerenveen	52°58′11″N 5°56′23″E	Boktjasker	1887	Demolished post-1890.	
Heerenveen	De Fortuin; Fortuna; 52°57′25″N 5°55′34″E	Stellingmolen	1711	Demolished 1886.	
Heerenveen	De Hoop; 52°57′31″N 5°55′07″E	Stellingmolen	1807	Demolished 1922.	
Heerenveen	De Hoop; 52°57′07″N 5°55′56″E	Stellingmolen	1873	Moved to Oudleussen, Overijssel 1913.	
Heerenveen	De Hoop; 52°57′56″N 5°56′29″E	Stellingmolen	1854	Burnt down 1872.	
Heerenveen	De Onderneming; 52°57′48″N 5°56′11″E	Stellingmolen	1855	Moved to Sneek c.1870.	
Heerenveen	Oud Polder 3; 52°57′48″N 5°57′06″E		Before 1832	Demolished before 1850.	
Heerenveen	Polder 3 Hornstra's Molen; 52°57′20″N 5°57′18″E	Grondzeiler	1873	Burnt down 1937.	
Heerenveen	Polder 4; 52°57′40″N 5°56′54″E	Spinnenkopmolen	Before 1832	Demolished post-1928.	
Heerenveen	Polder 5; 52°57′46″N 5°56′38″E		Before 1832	Demolished before 1922.	
Heerenveen	Polder 6; 52°55′37″N 5°56′57″E	Spinnenkopmolen	Between 1848 and 1853	Burnt down 1900.	
Heerenveen	Polder 6; 52°57′12″N 5°57′06″E	Spinnenkopmolen	Between 1858 and 1853	Demolished post-1925.	
Heerenveen	Polder 6a 52°55′14″N 5°56′53″E	Grondzeiler	Between 1887 and 1897	Demolished post-1925.	
Heerenveen	Polder 6b 52°55′36″N 5°57′06″E	Spinnenkopmolen	1900	Demolished before 1926.	
Heerenveen	Polder 7; 52°55′37″N 5°57′18″E	Spinnenkopmolen	Between 1832 and 1848	Demolished between 1926 and 1929.	
Heerenveen	Polder 7; 52°57′42″N 5°56′22″E		Before 1832	Demolished before 1922.	
Heerenveen	Polder 7a 52°57′42″N 5°56′26″E		Before 1832	Demolished before 1850.	
Heerenveen	Polder 8; 52°57′37″N 5°56′13″E	Spinnenkopmolen	Before 1832	Demolished post-1930.	
Heerenveen	Polder 8; 52°55′42″N 5°57′40″E	Spinnenkopmolen	Before 1848	Demolished between 1926 and 1929.	
Heerenveen	Polder 9; 52°57′31″N 5°55′59″E		Before 1877	Demolished before 1922.	
Heerenveen	Polder 9 Sierdsmamoune; 52°55′44″N 5°57′56″E	Spinnenkopmolen	Between 1873 and 1887	Blown down 1922.	
Heerenveen	Polder 10; 52°57′31″N 5°55′50″E		Before 1877	Demolished before 1922.	
Heerenveen	Polder 10; Stichtingspoldermolen; 52°55′44″N 5°58′07″E	Spinnenkopmolen	Before 1832	Demolished 1925.	
Heerenveen	Polder 11; 52°57′25″N 5°55′47″E		Before 1877	Demolished between 1922 and 1928.	
Heerenveen	Polder 11; 52°55′44″N 5°58′21″E	Tjasker	Before 1904	Demolished before 1925.	
Heerenveen	Polder 12; 52°58′09″N 5°56′21″E		Before 1832	Demolished post-1887.	
Heerenveen	Polder 12; Tjongermolen; 52°55′51″N 5°59′09″E	Grondzeiler	1869	Blown down 1918.	
Heerenveen	Polder 12; Tjongermolen; 52°55′51″N 5°59′09″E	Grondzeiler	1918	Moved within Heerenveen 1975.	
Heerenveen	Polder 13; 52°58′05″N 5°56′09″E		Before 1832	Demolished 1892.	
Heerenveen	Polder 14; 52°58′24″N 5°55′35″E		Before 1877	Demolished before 1922.	
Heerenveen	Polder 16; Schansterpoldermolen; 52°58′05″N 5°00′00″E	Spinnenkopmolen	1713	Demolished 1924.	
Heerenveen	Polder 17; 52°58′01″N 5°54′00″E		1873/74	Demolished before 1929.	
Heerenveen	Polder 18; 52°57′58″N 5°54′00″E	Spinnenkopmolen	Before 1832	Demolished post-1850.	
Heerenveen	Polder20; De Tweede Polder; De Kleine Polder; 52°57′35″N 5°54′23″E	Spinnenkopmolen	1784	Demolished between 1920 and 1930.	
Heerenveen	Polder 21; 52°57′03″N 5°54′33″E	Boktjasker	Before 1877	Demolished between 1922 and 1928.	
Heerenveen	Polder 22; 52°57′20″N 5°55′09″E	Spinnenkopmolen	Before 1832	Demolished between 1952 and 1959.	
Heerenveen	Polder 23; 52°57′16″N 5°55′13″E	Spinnenkopmolen	Before 1832	Demolished between 1952 and 1959.	
Heerenveen	Polder 24; 52°57′02″N 5°55′23″E	Spinnenkopmolen	Between 1850 and 1877	Demolished before 1929.	
Heerenveen	Polder 25; 52°56′51″N 5°54′46″E	Spinnenkopmolen	Before 1877	Demolished post-1929.	
Heerenveen	Polder 26; 52°57′22″N 5°55′29″E	Spinnenkopmolen	Before 1832	Demolished post-1943.	
Heerenveen	Polder 27; 52°57′16″N 5°55′35″E		Before 1832	Demolished post-1930.	
Heerenveen	Polder 28; 52°57′11″N 5°55′46″E	Spinnenkopmolen	Before 1875	Demolished before 1930.	
Heerenveen	{Polder 29; 52°56′52″N 5°55′51″E	Spinnenkopmolen	Between 1832 and 1848	Demolished before 1928.	
Heerenveen	Polder 126; 52°58′56″N 5°53′39″E	Tjasker			
Heerenveen	De Volharding; 52°57′59″N 5°56′39″E	Stellingmolen	1881	Demolished 1934.	
Heerenveen	De Windhond; 52°57′30″N 5°55′26″E	Stellingmolen	1716	Burnt down 1880.	
Heerenveen	Haskerveenpoldermolen; Kramersmolen; Nr. 1; 52°58′40″N 5°53′46″E	Grondzeiler	1860	Demolished 1920.	
Heerenveen	Heerenwalsterpoldermolen; 52°57′45″N 5°54′20″E		1719	Demolished 1854.	
Heerenveen	Polder 19; Heerenwalsterpoldermolen; Schansterpoldermolen; 52°57′45″N 5°54′20″E	Spinnenkopmolen	1854	Demolished 1939.	
Heerenveen	52°57′47″N 5°55′04″E	Stellingmolen	1737	Demolished 1805.	
Heerenveen	Het Fortuin; 52°57′47″N 5°55′04″E	GrondzeilerStellingmolen	1805	Moved to Hankate, Overijssel 1892.	
Heerenveen	Molen van Albert van Meurs van Vollenhoven; 52°58′02″N 5°55′50″E		Before 1832	Demolished before 1850.	
Heerenveen	Molen van C. F. S. Grovestins; 52°57′23″N 5°55′53″E	Spinnenkopmolen	Before 1832	Demolished post-1935.	
Heerenveen	Molen van Gerrit Ponne; 52°58′03″N 5°55′54″E		Before 1832	Demolished post-1854.	
Heerenveen	Molen van Harmen Bosscher; 52°58′28″N 5°56′51″E		Before 1832	Demolished before 1850.	
Heerenveen	Molen van Hendrik Nijenhuis; 52°58′32″N 5°57′16″E		Before 1832	Demolished post-1850.	
Heerenveen	Molen van Hendrik Nijenhuis; 52°58′27″N 5°57′12″E		Before 1832	Demolished post-1850.	
Heerenveen	Molen van Isaac van der Bergh; 52°58′22″N 5°56′27″E		Before 1832	Demolished post-1854.	
Heerenveen	Molen van Jelle Jongsma; 52°58′10″N 5°56′39″E		Before 1832	Demolished before 1850.	
Heerenveen	Molen van Marcus van Heloma; 52°58′01″N 5°55′41″E		Before 1832	Demolished post-1854.	
Heerenveen	Molen van Martinus Wagenaar; 52°58′07″N 5°55′42″E		Before 1832	Demolished post-1854.	
Heerenveen	Molen van Meijnt Douwes; 52°57′32″N 5°55′26″E	Standerdmolen	1613	Demolished c.1716.	
Heerenveen	Molen van Pieter Elzinga; 52°58′13″N 5°54′40″E		Before 1832	Demolished post-1850.	
Heerenveen	Molen van Rigtje Boornstra; 52°58′15″N 5°56′29″E		Before 1832	Demolished before 1850.	
Heerenveen	Molen van Thijs Pieters; 52°57′33″N 5°55′27″E	Standerdmolen	1598	Demolished before 1621.	
Heerenveen	Molen van Tjeerd Brouwer; 52°58′14″N 5°56′47″E		Before 1832	Demolished before 1850.	
Heerenveen	Molen van Van der Sluis; 52°57′26″N 5°55′12″E	Stellingmolen	1845	Demolished 1870.	
Heerenveen	52°56′37″N 5°56′14″E				
Heerenveen	52°57′15″N 5°57′40″E	Tjasker	1900	Demolished befofe 1925.	
Heerenveen	52°56′43″N 5°55′58″E	]Spinnenkopmolen	Before 1853	Demolished c.1860.	
Heerenveen	52°57′02″N 5°56′50″E	Spinnenkopmolen	Between 1875 and 1900	Demolished 1934.	
Heerenveen	52°55′43″N 5°57′28″E	Spinnenkopmolen	Between 1832 and 1848	Demolished c.1904.	
Heerenveen					
Heerenveen	Polder Schotanus; Molen van Dove Auke; 52°57′13″N 5°57′09″E	Grondzeiler	1887	Demolished 1955.	
Heerenveen	Schoter Molen; 52°56′25″N 5°56′53″E	Standerdmolen	Between 1580 and 1595	Demolished 1808.	
Heerenveen	Sibenga's Molen; 52°57′22″N 5°55′17″E	Stellingmolen	1858	Burnt down 1973.	
Heerenveen	Terbandsterpolder; 52°58′31″N 5°54′50″E	Grondzeiler	1741	Demolished 1876.	
Heerenveen	52°55′46″N 5°58′24″E	Tjasker	Before 1904	Demolished before 1925/	
Heerenveen	Veenderijmolen; 52°55′34″N 5°57′06″E		1851	Demolished c.1864.	
Heerenveen	52°57′27″N 5°55′31″E		Before 1649	Demolished 1721.	
Heerenveen	Zaagmolen van Sipke de Boer; 52°57′18″N 5°55′15″E		1874	Demolished 1889.	
Hemelum	Hemelumerpolder; Zoolpolder; De Zoalmolen; 52°52′22″N 5°27′04″E	Grondzeiler	1847	Demolished 1951.	
Hemelum	Hemelumer Veenen; Nijebuurster Polder; 52°52′39″N 5°29′52″E	Grondzeiler	Between 1832 and 1850	Demolished 1930.	
Hemelum	Korenmolen van Hemelum; 52°52′33″N 5°27′31″E	Standerdmolen	Before 1509	Demolished between 1806 and 1819.	
Hemelum	Molen van Dirk Schaper; 52°53′07″N 5°28′02″E	Spinnenkopmolen	Before 1832	Demolished before 1850.	
Hemelum	Molen van Dirk Schaper; 52°53′19″N 5°28′41″E		Before 1832	Demolished before 1850.	
Hemelum	Molen vna Herke van Rijs; 52°52′45″N 5°28′54″E	Spinnenkopmolen	Before 1832	Demolished before 1850.	
Hemelum	Molen van Minne Bouwma; 52°52′56″N 5°27′00″E	Spinnenkopmolen	Before 1832	Demolished before 1850.	
Hemelum	Polder 13a 52°54′01″N 5°28′04″E	Spinnenkopmolen	Before 1832	Demolished between 1923 and 1929.	
Hemelum	Polder 27; Vogelshoekpolder; Molen van Backer; 52°53′16″N 5°27′37″E	Grondzeiler	Between 1855 and 1873	Dismantled c.1970. Re-erected at Zuiderzee Museum, Enkhuizen, North Holland 1984.	
Hemelum	52°53′20″N 5°28′42″E	Tjasker	Before 1933	Demolished 1946.	
Hemert	Molen van IJsbrand Galema; 53°05′40″N 5°31′19″E	Spinnenkopmolen	Before 1832	Demolished c.1894.	
Hemrik	Molen de Vries; 53°02′07″N 6°09′11″E	Beltmolen	1884	Demolished 1937.	
Herbaijum	Molen van Jan Pars; 53°10′51″N 5°29′26″E		Before 1832	Demolished before 1850.	
Herbaijum	Molen van Mink Douma; 53°10′42″N 5°29′36″E	Spinnenkopmolen	Before 1832	Demolished post-1850.	
Herbaijum	Molen van Nathan Leeuwenstein; 53°10′46″N 5°30′02″E	Spinnenkopmolen	Before 1832	Demolished post-1850.	
Hichtum	Molen van Dodoneus Reneman; 53°04′45″N 5°31′04″E	Spinnenkopmolen	Before 1832	Demolished 1839.	
Hichtum	Molen van Jared Ypes; 53°05′08″N 5°30′23″E	Spinnenkopmolen	Before 1832	Demolished c. 1884.	
Hichtum	Molen van Sijbe Wiersma; 53°05′09″N 5°31′41″E		Before 1832	Demolished between 1895 and 1909.	
Hichtum	Polder 419; 53°04′30″N 5°33′10″E	Spinnenkopmolen	Before 1832	Burnt down 1916.	
Hichtum	Polder 421; 53°04′45″N 5°30′41″E	Spinnenkopmolen	Before 1832	Demolished 1921.	
Hichtum	Polder 422; 53°05′12″N 5°30′36″E	Grondzeiler	1884	Demolished between 1929 and 1941.	
Hichtum	Polder 424; 53°05′14″N 5°30′57″E	Spinnenkopmolen	Before 1832	Demolished 1942.	
Hichtum	Polder 425; 53°05′15″N 5°31′01″E		Before 1832	Demolished 1915.	
Hichtum	Polder 426; 53°05′02″N 5°31′24″E	Spinnenkopmolen	Before 1832	Demolished 1916.	
Hichtum	Polder 427; 53°04′43″N 5°32′02″E	Spinnenkopmolen	Before 1832	Demolished 1832.	
Hichtum	Polder 427; 53°04′43″N 5°32′02″E	Grondzeiler	1832	Demolished 1936.	
Hichtum	Polder 431; 53°05′14″N 5°31′32″E	Grondzeiler	Before 1832	Demolished c.1929.	
Hichtum	name 53°05′02″N 5°31′13″E	Tjasker	Before 1929	Demolished post-1931.	
Hidaard	Polder 376; Hidaarder Poldermolen; 53°04′47″N 5°35′30″E	Spinnenkopmolen	1787	Demolished between 1951 and 1957.	
Hidaard	Korenmolen van Hidaard	Standerdmolen	Before 1511	Demolished before 1664.	
Hidaard	Molen van de Gereformeerde Kerk; 53°04′42″N 5°36′29″E	Spinnenkopmolen	Before 1832	Demolished before 1850.	
Hidaard	Molen van Gerben Wiersma; 53°04′59″N 5°36′56″E	Spinnenkopmolen	Before 1832	Demolished post-1850.	
Hidaard	Molen van Gijsbert Verschuur; 53°04′30″N 5°36′14″E	Spinnenkopmolen	Before 1832	Demolished before 1850.	
Hidaard	Molen van Jan Hagema; 53°04′55″N 5°35′34″E	Spinnenkopmolen	Before 1832	Demolished post-1850.	
Hidaard	Molen van Jr. Idzert Aebinga van Humalda; 53°04′37″N 5°36′29″E	Spinnenkopmolen	Before 1832	Demolished post-1850.	
Hidaard	Molen van Wijbe IJpma; 53°04′44″N 5°36′58″E	Spinnenkopmolen	Before 1832	Demolished before 1850.	
Hidaard	Polder 327; 53°04′15″N 5°36′27″E	Spinnenkopmolen	Before 1832	Demolished post-1930.	
Hidaard	Polder 321; 53°04′11″N 5°36′07″E	Spinnenkopmolen	Before 1832	Demolished post-1930.	
Hidaard	Polder 329; Molen Klein Hoekens; 53°04′33″N 5°36′24″E	Grondzeiler	Between 1873 and 1887	Blown down 1981.	
Hidaard	Polder 329a 53°04′39″N 5°36′49″E		Before 1873	Demolished before 1928.	
Hidaard	Polder 330; 53°04′45″N 5°37′01″E		Before 1832	Demolished post-1850.	
Hidaard	Polder 377; 53°04′53″N 5°36′52″E	Spinnenkopmolen	Before 1832	Demolished before 1850.	
Hinnaard	Molen van het Gasthuis; 53°06′51″N 5°37′06″E	Spinnenkopmolen	Before 1832	Demolished post-1850.	
Hidaard	Polder 381 / 384; 53°04′25″N 5°35′41″E	Spinnenkopmolen	Before 1832	Demolished between 1951 and 1957.	
Hidaard	Rispenserpoldermolen; 53°00′N 5°30′E	Grondzeiler	1821	Moved to Easterein 1994.	
Hieslum	Horsa en Hieslumer Polders; 53°00′23″N 5°29′31″E		Before 1873	Demolished before 1928.	
Hieslum	Molen van Hans de Blocq van Scheltinga; 53°00′31″N 5°32′55″E	Spinnenkopmolen	Before 1832	Demolished post-1850.	
Hieslum	Molen van Hans de Blocq van Scheltinga; 53°00′23″N 5°29′31″E	Spinnenkopmolen	Before 1832	Demolished before 1850.	
Hieslum	Polder 24; 53°00′37″N 5°29′57″E	Spinnenkopmolen	Before 1832	Demolished post-1930.	
Hieslum	Polder 25. 53°00′32″N 5°29′17″E	Spinnenkopmolen	Before 1873	Demolished before 1928.	
Hieslum	Polder 30; 53°00′17″N 5°29′22″E	Spinnenkopmolen	Before 1832	Demolished post-1930.	
Hijum	Mariëngaarder Molen	Standerdmolen	Between 1485 and 1506	Burnt down 1515.	
Hijum	Mariëngaarder Molen; 53°17′37″N 5°44′56″E	Standerdmolen	Between 1533 and 1541	Burnt down 1869.	
Hilaard	Molen van Jacobus Albarda; 53°10′02″N 5°42′36″E		Before 1832	Demolished post-1850.	
Hilaard	Polder 60; 53°10′33″N 5°40′35″E		Before 1832	Demolished before 1929.	
Hilaard	Polder 61; 53°10′26″N 5°40′46″E		Before 1873	Demolished before 1929.	
Hilaard	Polder 62; Molen van B. K. Bakker; 53°10′48″N 5°41′16″E	Spinnenkopmolen	Before 1832	Demolished between 1943 and 1947.	
Hilaard	Polder 64; 53°10′14″N 5°40′51″E		Before 1832	Demolished before 1929.	
Hilaard	Polder 65; 53°10′10″N 5°40′51″E		Before 1821	Demolished before 1929.	
Hilaard	Polder 66; 53°10′01″N 5°41′12″E	Grondzeiler	Before 1830	Demolished post-1930.	
Hilaard	Polder 67; 53°09′34″N 5°41′07″E		Before 1832	Demolished before 1929.	
Hilaard	Polder 68; 53°09′50″N 5°42′06″E		Before 1832	Demolished before 1929.	
Hilaard	Polder 69; 53°09′50″N 5°42′40″E		Before 1832	Demolished before 1928.	
Hilaard	Polder 70; 53°10′05″N 5°42′47″E	Grondzeiler	Before 1850	Demolished post-1930.	
Hilaard	Polder 111; 53°09′30″N 5°42′00″E		Before 1832	Demolished before 1928.	
Hilaard	Polder Kleine Lions; 53°09′22″N 5°41′10″E	Spinnenkopmolen	Before 1832	Demolished post-1930.	
Hindeloopen	Bosmapoldermolen; De Kievit; 52°56′13″N 5°25′00″E	Spinnenkopmolen	1812	Demolished 1931.	
Hindeloopen	Gelderhuisterpoldermolen; 52°55′21″N 5°25′26″E	Grondzeiler	1850	Demolished post-1928.	
Hindeloopen	Haanmeerpoldermolen; 52°55′20″N 5°25′26″E	Grondzeiler	1850	Demolished post-1928.	
Hindeloopen	Korenmolen van Hindeloopen; 52°56′34″N 5°24′00″E	Standerdmolen	Before 1560	Moved within Hindeloopen 1638.	
Hindeloopen	Molen van Grietje de Jong; 52°55′24″N 5°25′08″E		Before 1832	Demolished before 1850.	
Hindeloopen	Molen van Hindeloopen; 52°56′32″N 5°24′22″E	Standerdmolen	1638	Demolished post-1780.	
Hindeloopen	Molen van Hindeloopen; 52°56′32″N 5°23′57″E	Stellingmolen	1779/80	Demolished 1815.	
Hindeloopen	Polder 1 Polder Feenstra; 52°56′08″N 5°24′20″E	Grondzeiler	1864	Demolished 1950.	
Hindeloopen	Polder 2 Polder Folkertsma; 52°56′16″N 5°24′33″E	Spinnenkopmolen	1850	Demolished post-1930.	
Hindeloopen	52°56′14″N 5°24′20″E	Weidemolen	Before 1850	Demolished before 1930.	
Hindeloopen	Schuilenburgerpoldermolen; 52°55′15″N 5°25′23″E	Grondzeiler	Before 1832	Burnt down 1930.	
Hindeloopen	Tjasker van J. Slot; 52°56′03″N 5°25′50″E	Tjasker	Before 1873	Demolished before 1932.	
Hinnaard	Polder 72; 53°07′22″N 5°37′55″E	Spinnenkopmolen	Before 1832	Demolished before 1929.	
Hinnaard	Polder 73; Molen van Zathe Sibranda; 53°07′17″N 5°37′52″E	Spinnenkopmolen	Before 1565	Demolished post 1928.	
Hinnaard	Polder 75; 53°06′58″N 5°38′31″E	Grondzeiler	Before 1832	Demolished post-1930.	
Hinnaard	Polder 348; 53°06′38″N 5°38′46″E		Before 1873	Demolished before 1929.	
Hinnaard	Polder 349; 53°06′50″N 5°38′30″E	Spinnenkopmolen	Before 1832	Demolished post-1930.	
Hinnaard	Polder 350; 53°06′46″N 5°38′30″E	Spinnenkopmolen	Before 1832	Demolished before 1928.	
Hinnaard	Polder 351; 53°07′02″N 5°37′21″E	Spinnenkopmolen	Before 1832	Demolished post-1830.	
Hinnaard	Polder 352; 53°06′44″N 5°37′55″E	Spinnenkopmolen	Before 1832	Demolished before 1928.	
Hitzum	Molen van Eeltje Faber; 53°09′59″N 5°30′01″E		Before 1832	Demolished post-1850.	
Hitzum	Molen van Jan IJsenbeek; 53°10′15″N 5°30′38″E	Spinnenkopmolen	Before 1832	Demolished before 1850.	
Hitzum	Polder Doijem; 53°09′46″N 5°31′49″E		Before 1832	Demolished before 1928.	
Hitzum	Polder Hitsum; 53°10′14″N 5°31′14″E		Before 1832	Demolished 1908.	
Hitzum	Polder van Andela; 53°10′12″N 5°30′23″E		Before 1873	Demolished 1922.	
Hitzum	Polder van Popsum; 53°10′02″N 5°30′15″E		Before 1832	Demolished before 1928.	
Hogebeintum	Hegebeintumer Mûne; De Hogebeintumermolen; 53°19′33″N 5°51′07″E	Grondzeiler	1860		
Hogebeintum	Hogebeintumpoldermolen; 53°19′33″N 5°51′07″E	Grondzeiler	Before 1832	Demolished 1860.	
Hollum	De Verwachting; 53°26′24″N 5°38′00″E	Stellingmolen	1841/42	Demolished 1950.	
Hollum	De Verwachting; 53°26′24″N 5°38′00″E	Stellingmolen	1991		
Hollum	Mosterdmolen van Visser; 53°26′28″N 5°38′12″E		1848	Demolished c.1860.	
Hollum	Zaagmolen van Swart	Stellingmolen	Between 1783 and 1785	Moved to Deventer, Overijssel 1802.	
Holwerd	De Hoop; 53°21′52″N 5°54′07″E	Stellingmolen	1711	Demolished 1849.	
Holwerd	De Hoop; 53°21′52″N 5°54′07″E	Stellingmolen	1849	(in Dutch)	
Holwerd	Miedenmolen; 53°20′29″N 5°55′09″E	Grondzeiler	1855		
Holwerd	Korenmolen van Holwerd; 53°21′52″N 5°54′07″E		1400	Burnt down 1515.	
Holwerd	Korenmolen van Holwerd. 53°21′52″N 5°54′07″E		1515	Demolished before 1713.	
Holwerd	Molen van de Holwerderpolder; 53°20′29″N 5°55′09″E		Before 1832	Demolished 1855.	
Holwerd	Pelmolen van Ymes; 53°21′59″N 5°54′32″E		1699	Demolished 1751.	
Hommerts	De Grote Aap; 52°58′29″N 5°40′21″E	Spinnenkopmolen		Demolished 1916.	
Hommerts	Hempolder; Polder Oosterhem; Hemsmolen; 52°58′57″N 5°39′28″E	Spinnenkopmolen	Before 1832	Demolished 1916.	
Hommerts	Kalfpolder 't Kalf; 52°59′24″N 5°38′46″E	Grondzeiler	Before 1832	Demolished 1916/	
Hommerts	Kleine Wiel; 52°58′32″N 5°39′18″E	Weidemolen	Before 1718	Demolished before 1832.	
Hommerts	Polder 201 't Brouwerskritje; 52°59′06″N 5°39′57″E		Before 1832	Demolished 1925.	
Hommerts	Polder 202; 52°58′13″N 5°39′10″E	Spinnenkopmolen	Before 1832	Demolished before 1916.	
Hommerts	Polder 203; Polder Lippenwoude; 52°58′07″N 5°39′07″E	Spinnenkopmolen	Before 1832	Demolished 1916.	
Hommerts	Polder 204; 52°58′05″N 5°40′40″E		Before 1832	Demolished before 1929.	
Hommerts	Polder 206; 52°58′53″N 5°38′50″E	Grondzeiler	Before 1832	Demolished 1916.	
Hommerts	Polder 207; Duizend Gulden; 52°58′39″N 5°37′38″E	Grondzeiler	Before 1832	Demolished 1916.	
Hommerts	Polder 208; 52°58′31″N 5°38′54″E		1873	Demolished before 1930.	
Hommerts	Polder 208; 52°58′44″N 5°38′52″E	Spinnenkopmolen	Before 1832	Demolished 1916.	
Hommerts	Polder 208a 52°58′22″N 5°38′56″E	Spinnenkopmolen	before 1832	Demolished 1916.	
Hommerts	Polder Het Zwarte Paard 't Zwart Paard; 52°59′19″N 5°38′57″E	Grondzeiler	Before 1832	Demolished before 1916.	
Hommerts	Polder Kleine Krim; De Aapmolen; 52°58′30″N 5°40′22″E	Spinnenkopmolen	Between 1850 and 1873	Demolished 1916.	
Hommerts	52°58′09″N 5°41′25″E		Before 1850	Demolished before 1908.	
Hommerts	52°58′06″N 5°41′25″E		Before 1908	Demolished before 1932.	
Hommerts	52°58′05″N 5°41′07″E		Before 1832	Demolished post-1855.	
Hommerts	Polder Rietschar; 52°58′17″N 5°40′29″E				
Hommerts	Tjetschar; 52°58′21″N 5°41′24″E		Before 1908	Demolished post-1932.	
Hoornsterzwaag	Polder 8 De Pollemolen; 52°58′54″N 6°09′49″E	Grondzeiler	Before 1877	Demolished between 1914 and 1918.	
Hoornsterzwaag	Rog Molen van Hornsterzwaag; 52°59′45″N 6°09′34″E	Standerdmolen	Befor3 1664	Demolished 1756.	
Hoornsterzwaag	Schoterlandsche Poel; 52°59′20″N 6°09′31″E		Before 1877	Demolished before 1922.	
Huizum	Hemrikspoldermolen	Spinnenkopmolen	1860	Moved to Rijperkerk in 1952; Molendatabase (in Dutch); De Hollandsche Molen (in Dutch)	
Húns	De Huinsermolen; 53°09′20″N 5°39′25″E	Grondzeiler	1829		
Húns	Molen van Abbe Postma; 53°09′14″N 5°39′22″E		Before 1832	Demolished before 1850.	
Húns	Molen van E. Halbersma; 53°09′28″N 5°39′22″E		Before 1832	Demolished before 1850.	
Húns	Molen van Jr. Frans van Lynden; 53°09′55″N 5°39′42″E		Before 1832	Demolished before 1850.	
Húns	Molen van Jr. Joan van Pallandt; 53°09′18″N 5°39′43″E		Before 1832	Demolished before 1850.	
Húns	Molen van Oneas Faber; 53°09′14″N 5°39′12″E		Before 1832	Demolished post-1850.	
Húns	Molen van Pals Kingma; 53°09′16″N 5°39′33″E		Before 1832	Demolished post-1850.	
Húns	Molen van Suffridus Salverda; 53°09′56″N 5°39′22″E		Before 1832	Demolished before 1860.	
Húns	Polder 96A; 53°09′24″N 5°40′45″E		Before 1873	Demolished before 1928.	
Húns	53°09′31″N 5°39′46″E		1850	Demolished post-1932.	
Hurdegaryp	Hardergarijperpoldermolen; 53°13′21″N 5°57′00″E	Grondzeiler	Before 1832	Demolished before 1928.	
Hurdegaryp	Korenmolen van Hardegarijp; 53°13′07″N 5°57′02″E	standerdmolen	Before 1664.	Demolished between 1718 and 1832.	
Hurdegaryp	Molen van Catharina Huber; 53°13′15″N 5°57′30″E		Before 1832	Demolished before 1850.	
Hurdegaryp	Molen van Gerber van der Feer; 53°12′57″N 5°55′39″E		Before 1832	Demolished before 1850.	
Hurdegaryp	Molen van Gosse Postma; 53°12′59″N 5°57′08″E		Before 1832	Demolished before 1850.	
Hurdegaryp	Molen van H. P. Smits; 53°12′25″N 5°56′13″E	Grondzeiler			
Hurdegaryp	Molen van Lutske Klazes; 53°13′13″N 5°56′44″E		Before 1832	Demolished before 1850.	
Hurdegaryp	Polder 126; 53°12′35″N 5°57′29″E	Spinnenkopmolen	Before 1854	Demolished before 1926.	
Hurdegaryp	Polder 158; 53°12′33″N 5°56′50″E	Grondzeiler	1855	Demolished 1933.	
Hurdegaryp	Polder 159; 53°12′40″N 5°55′47″E	Spinnenkopmolen	Before 1832	Demolished post-1930.	
Hurdegaryp	Poldder 160; 53°12′41″N 5°55′52″E	Spinnenkopmolen	Before 1832	Demolished post-1930.	
Hurdegaryp	Polder Hardegarijp; 53°12′51″N 5°56′48″E	Grondzeiler	Before 1832	Demolished between 1850 and 1874.	
Hurdegaryp	Polder Hardegarijp; 53°12′48″N 5°57′13″E	Grondzeiler	Before 1832	Demolished between 1850 and 1874.	
Hurdegaryp	Polder Hardegarijp; 53°13′24″N 5°57′32″E	Grondzeiler	Between 1832 and 1850	Demolished before 1874.	
Hurdegaryp	Polder Hardegarijp; 53°13′11″N 5°55′54″E		Before 1832	Demolished between 1850 and 1874.	
Hurdegaryp	Polder Hardegarijp; 53°12′57″N 5°57′02″E	Grondzeiler	Between 1832 and 1850	Demolished before 1874.	
Hurdegaryp	Polder Hardegarijp; 53°13′15″N 5°56′59″E	Grondzeiler		Demolished before 1874.	
Hurdegaryp	Polder Hardegarijp; 53°13′27″N 5°57′59″E	Grondzeiler	Between 1832 and 1850	Demolished before 1874.	
Hurdegaryp	Polder Hardegarijp; 53°13′35″N 5°57′46″E	Grondzeiler	Between 1832 and 1850	Demolished before 1874.	
Hurdegaryp	Polder P 53°12′56″N 5°57′55″E		1854	Demolished before 1926.	
Hurdegaryp	Polder Q 53°12′47″N 5°58′17″E		1854	Demolished before 1926.	

== I ==
Location	Name of mill	Type	Built	Notes	Photograph
Idaerd	Polder 33; 53°06′57″N 5°48′38″E	Grondzeiler	1817	Demolished 1926.	
Idaerd	Polder 34; 53°07′03″N 5°48′41″E	Spinnenkopmolen	Before 1832	Demolished before 1929.	
Idaerd	Polder 35; 53°06′57″N 5°49′32″E		Before 1832	Demolished before 1929.	
Idaerd	Polder 36; 53°07′14″N 5°49′19″E		Before 1832	Demolished before 1929.	
Idaerd	Polder 37; 53°07′30″N 5°48′59″E		Before 1832	Demolished before 1929.	
Idsegahuizum	Molen van Anne Buma; 53°02′34″N 5°25′24″E	Spinnenkopmolen	Before 1832	Demolished before 1850.	
Idsegahuizum	Molen van Freerk Tigchelaar; 53°02′32″N 5°25′51″E	Spinnenkopmolen	Before 1832	Demolished before 1850.	
Idsegahuizum	Molen van Jan Tilboer; 53°02′53″N 5°24′25″E	Grondzeiler	Before 1832	Demolished post-1850.	
Idsegahuizum			1776	Demolished post-1790.	
Idsegahuizum	Polder 1; 53°02′39″N 5°25′24″E	Grondzeiler	1864	Demolished before 1930.	
Idsegahuizum	Polder 3; 53°02′31″N 5°25′00″E	Spinnenkopmolen	Before 1832	Demolished post-1850.	
Idsegahuizum	Polder 4; 53°02′39″N 5°25′28″E	Spinnenkopmolen	Before 1832	Demolished post-1850.	
Idsegahuizum	Polder A 53°02′48″N 5°25′16″E	Spinnenkopmolen	Before 1832	Demolished post-1850.	
Idsegahuizum	Polder B 53°02′45″N 5°25′00″E		Before 1832	Demolished post-1850.	
Idsegahuizum	53°02′58″N 5°24′59″E		Before 1718	Demolished before 1832.	
Idserdaburen	Klomperpolder en Polder Monnikeburen; 52°59′45″N 5°29′13″E	StanderdmolenSpinnenkopmolen	Before 1832	Demolished between 1943 and 1950.	
Idserdaburen	Polder 156; 52°59′58″N 5°28′10″E	Spinnenkopmolen	Before 1832	Demolished post-1850.	
Idserdaburen	Polder 15a 52°59′50″N 5°28′22″E	Spinnenkopmolen	Before 1832	Demolished post-1850.	
Idserdaburen	Polder 16; 52°59′54″N 5°28′30″E	Spinnenkopmolen	Before 1832	Demolished 1936.	
Idserdaburen	Poldeer 28; 53°00′03″N 5°29′11″E	Spinnenkopmolen	Before 1832	Demolished post-1930.	
Idserdaburen	Polder 29; 53°00′10″N 5°29′18″E	Spinnenkopmolen	Before 1832	Demolished post-1930.	
Idskenhuizen	Korenmolen van Idskenhuizen; 52°55′45″N 5°42′56″E	Standerdmolen	Before 1664	Demolished 1766.	
Idskenhuizen	Polde 19; 52°55′52″N 5°42′38″E	Grondzeiler	Before 1832	Burnt down 1938.	
Idskenhuizen	Polder 20; 52°55′40″N 5°42′13″E	Spinnenkopmolen	Before 1832	Demolished between 1928 and 1932.	
Idskenhuizen	Polder 21; 52°55′29″N 5°41′55″E		Before 1873	Demolished post-1932.	
Idskenhuizen	Polder 21A; 52°55′42″N 5°41′07″E	Spinnenkopmolen	Before 1832	Demolished post-1923.	
Idskenhuizen	Polder C 52°55′29″N 5°42′53″E	Grondzeiler	Before 1850	Demolished between 1928 and 1932.	
Idskenhuizen	52°55′16″N 5°43′02″E		Before 1850	Demolished post-1930.	
Idskenhuizen	52°55′52″N 5°41′16″E		1877	Demolished post-1909.	
Idskenhuizen	Polder om Dorpwijk; 52°55′08″N 5°42′54″E	Grondzeiler	Before 1850	Demolished post-1930.	
Idskenhuizen	52°55′42″N 5°43′11″E	Weidemolen	Before 1909		
Idzega	Molen van Daniel Engelen; 52°58′53″N 5°32′39″E		Before 1832	Demolished 1880.	
Idzega	Polder 248; Hoop op Zegen; 52°58′53″N 5°32′39″E	Stellingmolen	1881	Demolished 1929.	
Idzega	Polder 249; 52°58′45″N 5°33′13″E	Grondzeiler	Before 1832	Blown down 1924.	
Idzega	Polder 265; 52°58′57″N 5°33′18″E	Grondzeiler	Before 1832	Demolished before 1929.	
Ie	Molen van J. H. Visser; 53.33219°N 6.10071°E	Stellingmolen	1687	Burnt down 1962.	
Iens	De Edensermolen; Ienzer Mole; 53.12233°N 5.60119°E	Grondzeiler	1847		
Iens	Polder Wijna; Polder de Boer; 53.11972°N 5.60694°E	Iron windpump	1930		
Iens	Molen van Jr. Frans van Eijsinga; 53.12282°N 5.60077°E	Spinnenkop	Before 1832	Demolished before 1850.	
Iens	Molen van Petrus Schuilenberg; 53.12527°N 5.60313°E	Spinnenkop	Before 1832		
Iens	Polder 48; 53.12527°N 5.60313°E	Grondzeiler		Demolished 1954.	
Iens	Polder 49; 53.11789°N 5.61783°E	Grondzeiler	Between 1832 and 1850	Demolished post-1929.	
Iens	Polder 50; 53.12416°N 5.61776°E		Before 1873	Demolished before 1928.	
Iens	Polder 51; 53.12662°N 5.61337°E	Spinnenkop	Before 1832	Demolished 1954.	
Iens	Polder 60; 53.12859°N 5.62025°E	Spinnenkop	Before 1832	Demolished before 1929.	
IJlst	Terpensmole; 53°00′53″N 5°37′45″E	Spinnenkop	2011		
IJlst	De Rat; 53°00′46″N 5°37′37″E	Stellingmolen	1828		
IJlst	De Eekmolen; 53°00′34″N 5°36′41″E	Standerdmolen	Before 1711	Demolished 1838.	
IJlst	De Eekmolen; 53°00′34″N 5°36′41″E	Stellingmolen	1838	Burnt down c.1870.	
IJlst	De Rogmolen; 53°00′49″N 5°37′30″E	Standerdmolen	Before 1664	Demolished before 1826.	
IJlst	Groenkappolder; Groenkapmolen; Hem's Molen; 53°00′09″N 5°37′43″E	Spinnenkopmolen	Before 1832	Demolished 1916.	
IJlst	Korenmolen van Ijlst; 53°00′40″N 5°37′17″E	Standerdmolen		Blown down 1519.	
IJlst	Korenmolen van Ijlst; 53°00′40″N 5°37′17″E	Standerdmolen	Before 1649	Moved within IJlst 1664.	
IJlst	Polder 47; De Ruiterpolder; Molen E 53°00′33″N 5°36′52″E	Spinnenkopmolen	Before 1832	Demolished before 1932.	
IJlst	Polder 48; De Spookmolen; 53°00′37″N 5°36′50″E	Grondzeiler	Before 1765	Demolished post-1930.	
IJlst	Polder 49; De Roodehem's Molen; 53°01′04″N 5°37′22″E	Spinnenkopmolen	Before 1811	Demolished post-1930.	
IJlst	Polder 88; Molen F 53°01′14″N 5°37′27″E	Spinnenkopmolen	Before 1811	Demolished post-1930.	
IJlst	Polder 146; Molen A 53°01′05″N 5°38′21″E	Spinnenkopmolen	Before 1811	Demolished post-1930.	
IJlst	Polder 149; Terpsmolen; 53°00′53″N 5°37′45″E	Spinnenkopmolen	Before 1832	Demolished 1916.	
IJlst	Polder 150; Botma Molen; 53°00′43″N 5°37′50″E	Spinnenkopmolen	Before 1811	Demolished 1915.	
IJlst	Polder 151; Molen B 53°00′36″N 5°38′00″E	Grondzeiler	Before 1811	Demolished 1916.	
IJlst	Polder 152; Molen C 53°00′32″N 5°38′05″E	Spinnenkopmolen	Before 1811	Demolished 1916.	
IJlst	Polder 153; Molen D 53°00′18″N 5°37′52″E	Spinnenkopmolen	Before 1811	Demolished 1916.	
IJlst	Polder De Ruiter; Molen De Ruiter; 53°00′14″N 5°37′39″E	Tjasker	Before 1811	Demolished before 1929.	
IJlst	53°00′24″N 5°37′00″E		Before 1718	Demolished before 1832.	
IJlst	53°00′39″N 5°37′13″E	Standerdmolen	Before 1649	Demolished before 1826.	
IJlst	Trompmolen; 53°00′44″N 5°37′24″E	Stellingmolen	Between 1750 and 1775	Demolished 1922.	
IJlst					
IJlst	Zaagmolen van W. M. Oppedijk; 53°00′36″N 5°36′53″E	Stellingmolen	Between 1775 and 1800	Burnt down 1873.	
Indijk	Molen van Cornelis de Koe; 52°56′49″N 5°37′50″E		Before 1832	Demolished before 1850.	
Indijk	Oud Polder 219; 52°56′26″N 5°37′08″E		1850	Demolished before 1873.	
Indijk	Polder 224; 52°56′31″N 5°35′29″E	Grondzeiler	Before 1832	Demolished post-1850.	
Indijk	Polder 225; 52°56′23″N 5°35′10″E	Grondzeiler	Before 1832	Demolished post-1930.	
Indijk	Polder 230; 52°56′37″N 5°36′07″E	Grondzeiler	Before 1832	Demolished 1925.	
Indijk	Polder 231; 52°56′51″N 5°36′37″E	Grondzeiler	Before 1832	Demolished post-1930.	
Indijk	Polder 232; 52°57′04″N 5°36′53″E	Spinnenkopmolen	Before 1832	Demolished post-1850.	
Indijk	52°57′05″N 5°37′04″E		1850	Demolished post-1930.	
Ingelum	Engelumerpoldermolen; 53°13′25″N 5°42′36″E	Grondzeiler	Between 1850 and 1873	Demolished 1919.	
Ingelum	Polder 14; 53°13′25″N 5°42′37″E	Grondzeiler	Between 1850 and 1873	Demolished 1927.	
Ingwierrum	Molen van Helder; 53°19′25″N 5°09′01″E	Achtkantmolen	1866	Demolished 1948, base demolished 1995.	
Itens	Windmotor Itens; Pieter Gerritspolder; 53°06′17″N 5°00′00″E	Iron windpump	1930		
Itens	Molen bij boerderij Hooghiem; 53°06′22″N 5°39′01″E	Spinnenkopmolen	Before 1562	Demolished post-1832.	
Itens	Polder 340a 53°05′57″N 5°38′11″E	Grondzeiler	Before 1832	Demolished post-1928.	
Itens	Polder 345; 53°06′24″N 5°39′53″E	Spinnenkopmolen	Before 1832	Demolished post-1930.	
Itens	Polder 346; 53°06′22″N 5°39′01″E	Grondzeiler	1832	Demolished post-1930.	
Itens	Polder 346; 53°06′17″N 5°38′48″E	Spinnenkopmolen	Before 1832	Demolished post-1850.	
Itens	Polder 347; 53°06′38″N 5°38′47″E	Grondzeiler	1867	Demolished 1959.	
Itens	Polder 352; 53°06′33″N 5°38′17″E	Grondzeiler	Between 1850 and 1873	Demolished post-1928.	
Itens	Polder 361; Molen bij boerderij Hoytehuis; 53°06′20″N 5°38′06″E	Spinnenkopmolen	Before 1565	Demolished between 1952 and 1975.	
Itens	Polder 362; 53°06′17″N 5°38′35″E	Spinnenkopmolen	Before 1832	Demolished post-1930.	
Itens	Molen van de Gereformeerde Armvoogdij; 53°06′38″N 5°38′47″E	Spinnenkopmolen	Before 1832	Demolished 1867.	
Itens	Molen van de Gereformeerde Kerk; 53°06′38″N 5°38′50″E	Spinnenkopmolen	Before 1832	Demolished post-1850.	
Itens	Molen van Frans van Eijsinga; 53°06′14″N 5°39′06″E	Spinnenkopmolen	Before 1832	Demolished before 1850.	
Itens	Molen van Pietje Wiersma; 53°06′10″N 5°39′05″E	Spinnenkopmolen	Before 1832	Demolished before 1850.	
Itens	Polder Itens; 53°06′01″N 5°38′59″E	Grondzeiler	Before 1832	Demolished post-1930.	
Itens	53°06′07″N 5°39′48″E	Spinnenkopmolen	Before 1832	Demolished before 1929.	
It Heidenskip	De Skarmolen; De Hoppe; 52°55′44″N 5°29′19″E	Iron windpump	1900		
It Heidenskip	De Zwarte Watermolen; 52°56′42″N 5°29′40″E	Spinnenkopmolen	1850	Demolished 1905.	
It Heidenskip	Heidenschapsterpoldermolen; 52°56′30″N 5°29′14″E	Grondzeiler	Before 1932	Demolished 1930, base demolished 1985.	
It Heidenskip	Molen bij boerderij Klein Welgelegen; 52°57′18″N 5°29′35″E	Grondzeiler	Between 1873 and 1904	Demolished 1930, base demolished 1985.	
It Heidenskip	Molen van Douwe Bouma; 52°57′03″N 5°31′24″E	Spinnenkopmolen	Before 1832		
It Heidenskip	Molen van Groenhof; 52°56′17″N 5°29′54″E	Grondzeiler	1910	Blown down 1949.	
It Heidenskip	Molen van Jouke Schilstra; 52°57′28″N 5°32′21″E	Spinnenkopmolen	Before 1832	Demolished post-1850.	
It Heidenskip	Polder 282; Kuipersmolen; 52°57′30″N 5°32′12″E	Grondzeiler	1848	Demolished 1953.	
It Heidenskip	Polder 285; 52°56′44″N 5°30′45″E	Spinnenkopmolen	Before 1832	Demolished 1919.	
It Heidenskip	Polder 285; Groen Molentje; 52°56′34″N 5°30′50″E	Grondzeiler	1850	Demolished 1928.	
It Heidenskip	Polder 286; 52°57′21″N 5°30′47″E	Grondzeiler	Before 1832	Blown down 1949.	
It Heidenskip	Polder 288; Helmolen; 52°57′10″N 5°30′06″E	Spinnenkopmolen	Before 1751	Blown down 1940.	
It Heidenskip	Polder 382; Molen van de Kooiboerderij; 52.°N 5.°E	Spinnenkopmolen	Before 1832	Demolished 1929.	
It Heidenskip	Polder 284; Oosthoekpoldermolen; 52°57′03″N 5°31′24″E	Grondzeiler	Before 1873	Demolished 1938.	
It Heidenskip	Polder Kuipers; 52°56′53″N 5°28′58″E	Grondzeiler	1922	Demolished 1943.	
It Heidenskip	Molen vam Teeke Hoekema; 52°58′21″N 5°27′54″E	Spinnenkopmolen	Before 1832		

== Notes ==
Mills still standing marked in bold. Known building dates are bold, otherwise the date is the earliest known date the mill was standing.
