= Iens =

Edens Iens
- Village
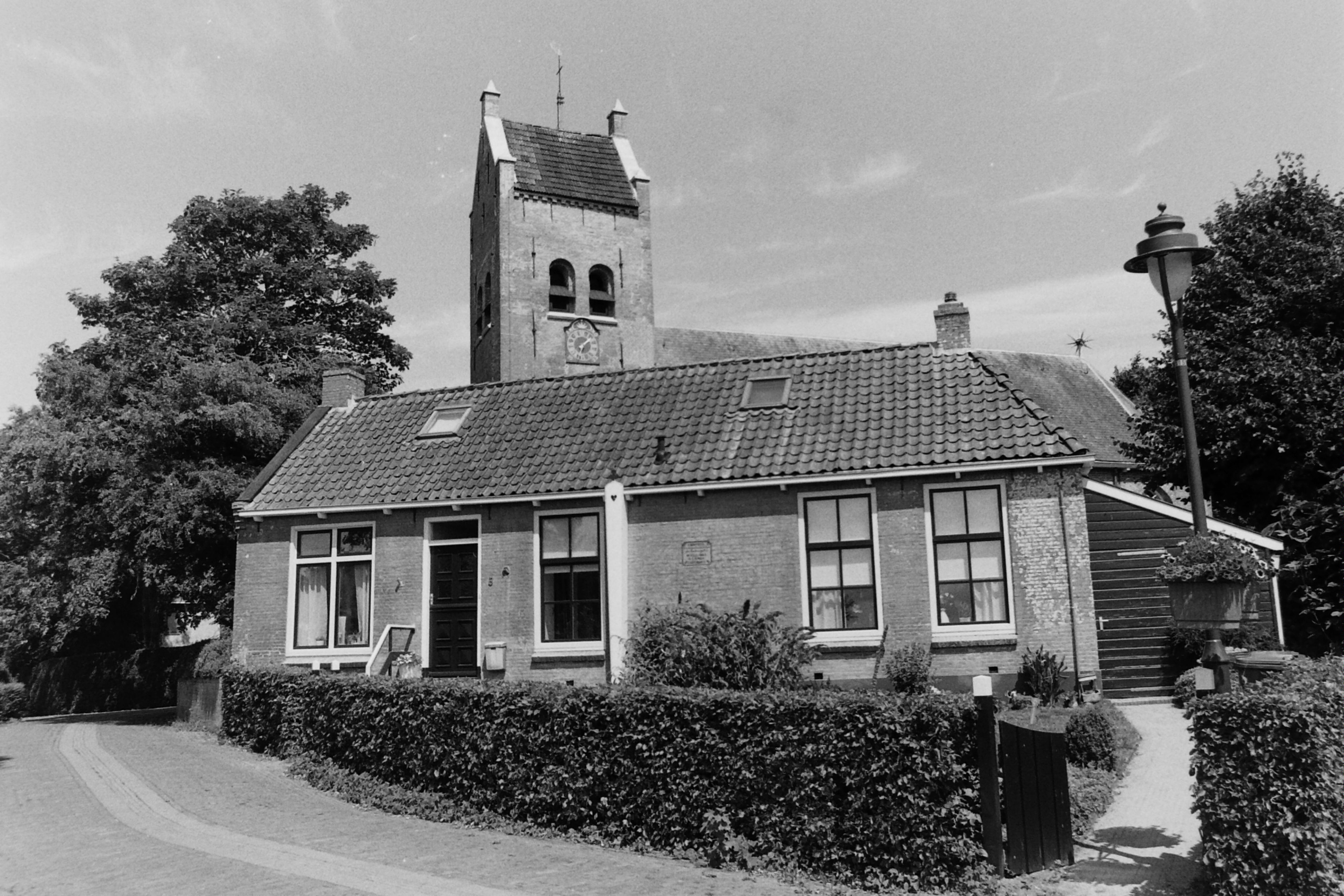
- Village view

- Flag Coat of arms

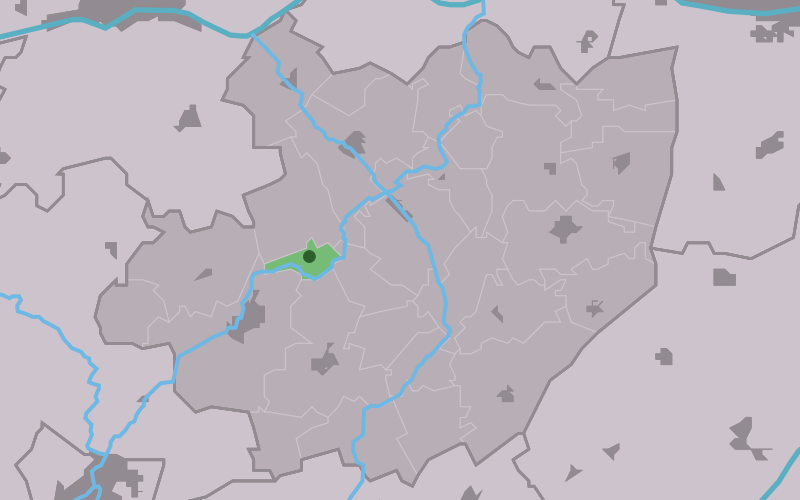
- Location in the former Littenseradiel municipality

- Location in the Netherlands Edens (Netherlands)
- Coordinates: 53°7′20″N 5°36′50″E
- Country: Netherlands
- Province: Friesland
- Municipality: Súdwest-Fryslân

Area
  - Total: 3.12 km^{2} (1.20 sq mi)
- Elevation: 0.4 m (1.3 ft)

Population (2021)
  - Total: 50
  - Density: 16/km^{2} (42/sq mi)
- Time zone: UTC+1 (CET)
  - Summer (DST): UTC+2 (CEST)
- Postal code: 8733
- Dialing code: 0515

Iens (Dutch: Edens) is a small village in Súdwest-Fryslân in the province Friesland of the Netherlands with a population of around 32 in January 2017.

== History ==
The village was first mentioned in the 13th century as Ederinghe, and means "settlement of the people of Ede (person)". Iens is a terp (artificial living hill) village.

Before 2018, the village was part of the Littenseradiel municipality and before 1984 it belonged to Hennaarderadeel municipality. It changed its official name from Edens to Iens in 1991.

Iens has a church dating from the thirteenth century. It was renewed in 1874, and the tower dates was restored in 1852. The choir was extended and includes the 1783 water well which used to be located outside the church. The Edensermolen, a smock mill built in 1847 for drainage has been restored and is held in reserve for emergencies. Iens was home to 48 people in 1840.

== Gallery ==
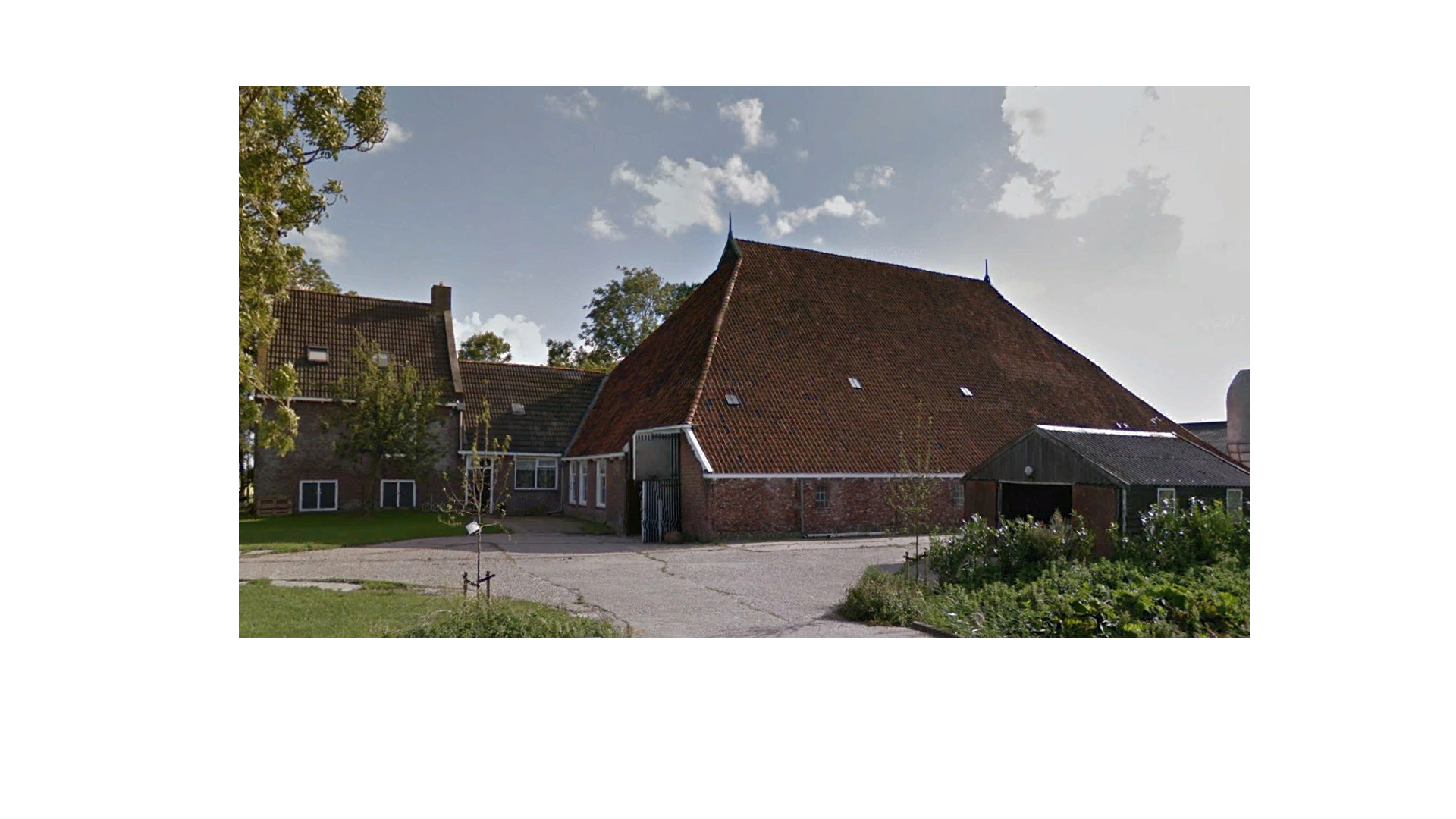
Farm in Iens

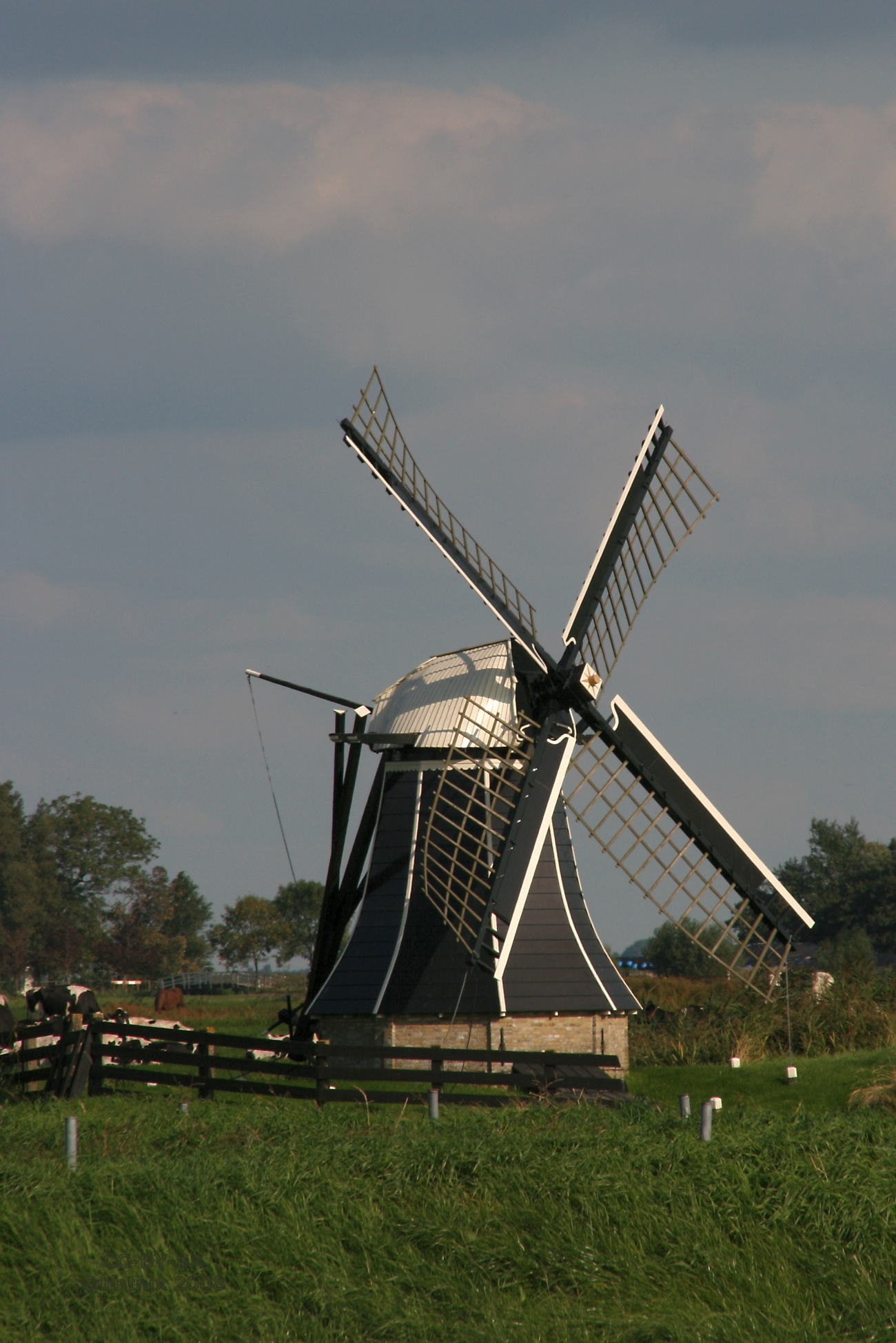
Windmill De Edensermolen
