= Hinnaard =

Hennaard Hinnaard
- Village
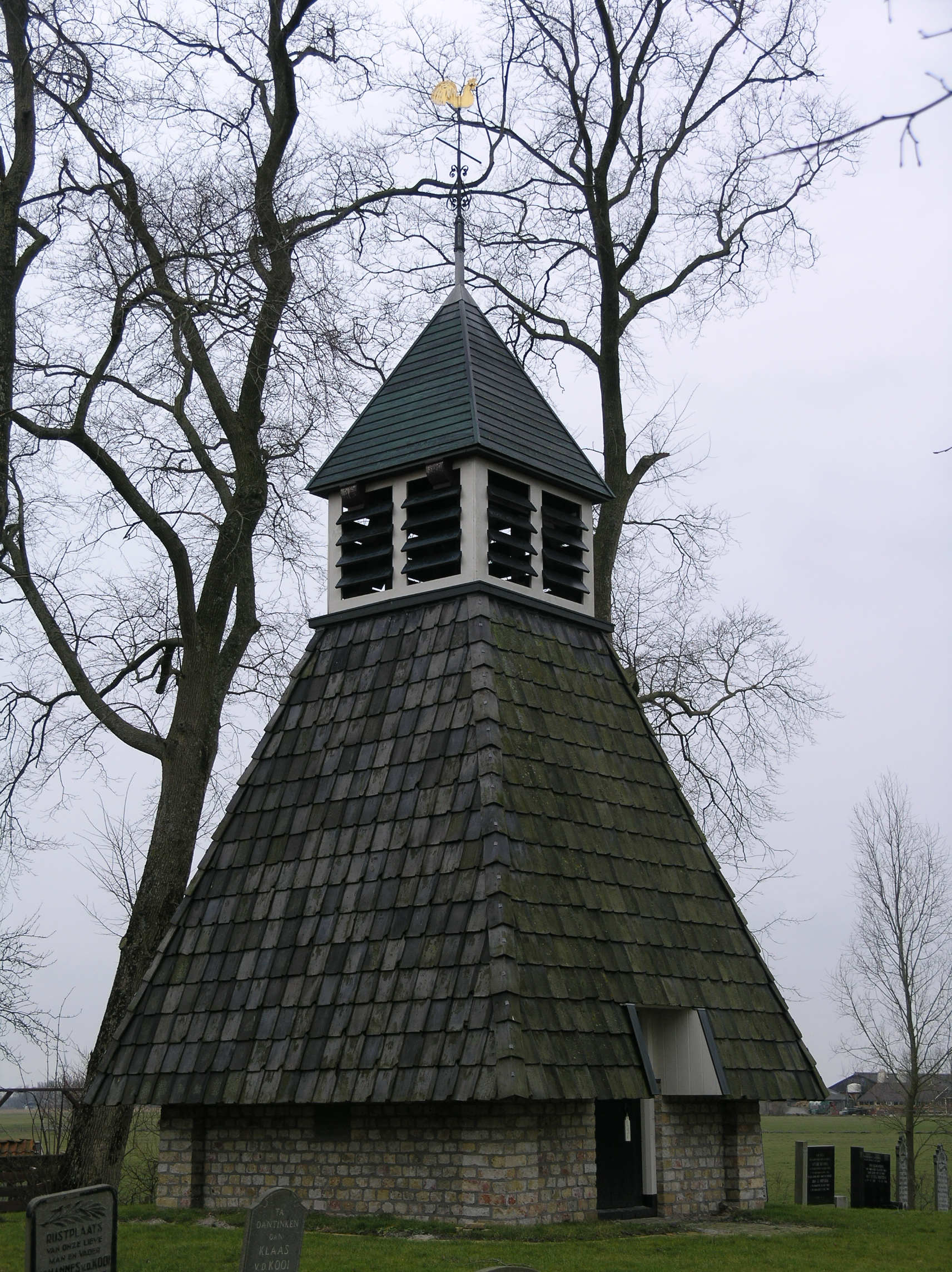
- Bell tower

- Coat of arms

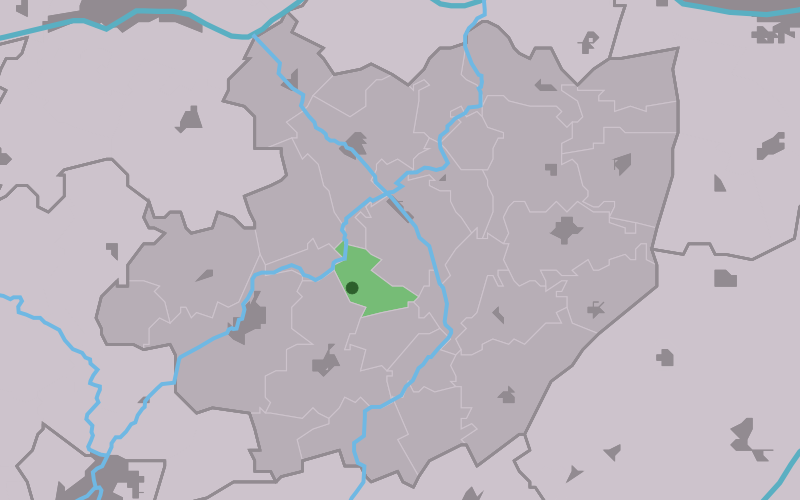
- Location in the former Littenseradiel municipality

- Location in the Netherlands Hennaard (Netherlands)
- Country: Netherlands
- Province: Friesland
- Municipality: Súdwest-Fryslân

Area
  - Total: 2.33 km^{2} (0.90 sq mi)
- Elevation: 0.2 m (0.66 ft)

Population (2021)
  - Total: 50
  - Density: 21/km^{2} (56/sq mi)
- Time zone: UTC+1 (CET)
  - Summer (DST): UTC+2 (CEST)
- Postal code: 8844
- Dialing code: 0515

Hinnaard (Dutch: Hennaard) is a small village in Súdwest-Fryslân in the province of Friesland, the Netherlands. It had a population of around 44 in January 2017.

== History ==
The village was first mentioned in 1319 as Hernawort, and means "terp on the corner". Hinnaard is a compact terp (artificial living hill) village. Even though it is small, the grietenij (predecessor of a municipality) Hennaarderadeel was named after the village, and during the late middle ages it was the location for court cases.

The church was demolished around 1862. In 1870, a little bell tower has built on the cemetery. The tower has a stone which states that the building was restored in 1731, however it probably belonged to the church. The bells are rung each day at 08:00, 12:00 and 18:00.

Hinnaard was home to 84 people in 1840. Before 2018, the village was part of the Littenseradiel municipality and before 1984 it belonged to Hennaarderadeel municipality.
