= De Hoop, Holwerd =

Smock mill in Friesland, Netherlands

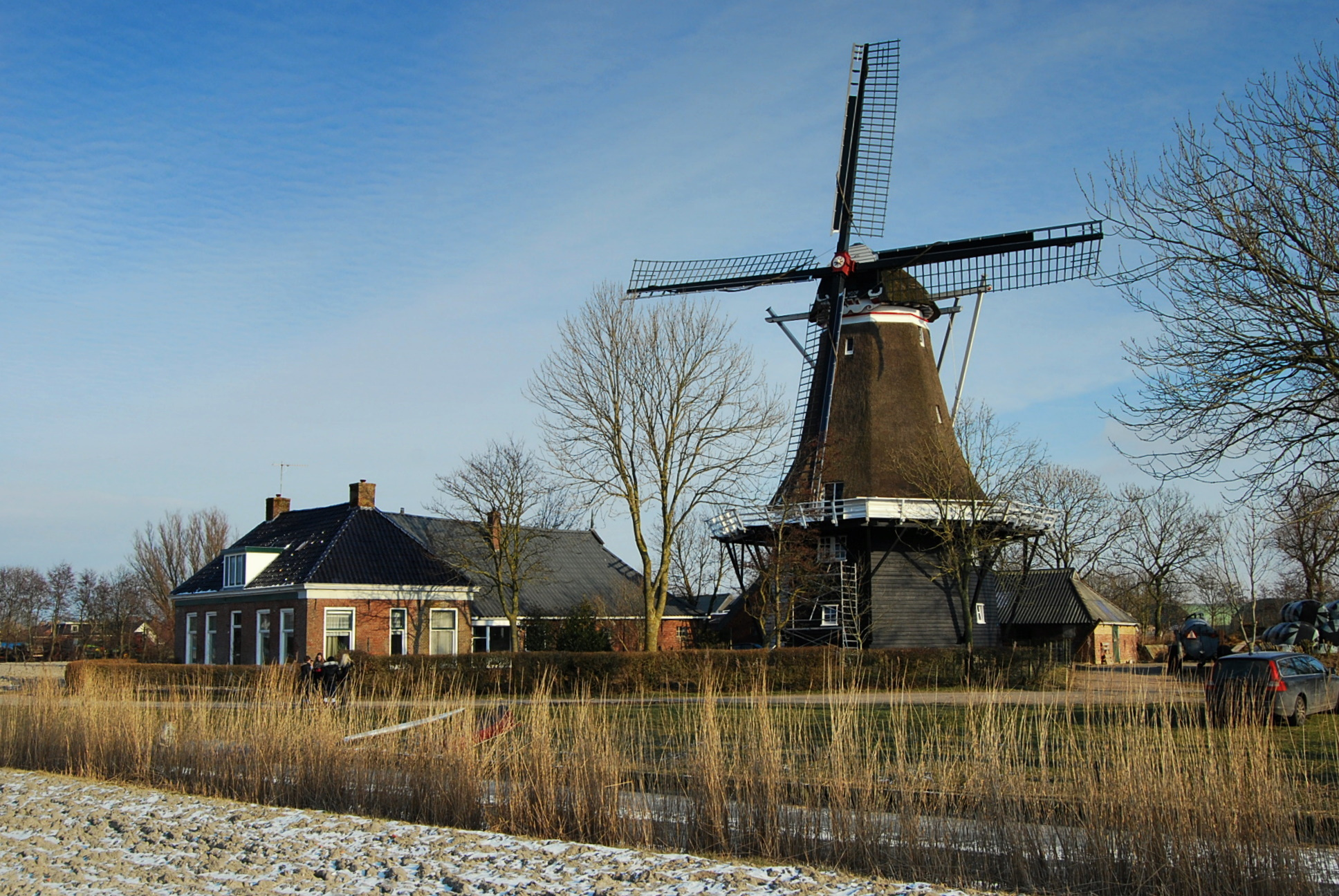
- De Hoop, 2012

Origin
- Mill name: De Hoop
- Mill location: Molenweg 1, 9151 JR, Hollum
- Coordinates: 53°21′51″N 5°54′07″E
- Operator: Stichting Monumentenbehoud Dongeradeel
- Year built: 1849

Information
- Purpose: Corn mill and barley mill
- Type: Smock mill
- Storeys: Two-storey smock
- Base storeys: Three-storey base
- Smock sides: Eight sides
- No. of sails: Four sails
- Type of sails: Common sails
- Windshaft: Cast iron
- Winding: Tailpole and winch
- No. of pairs of millstones: Three pairs
- Size of millstones: 1.40 metres (4 ft 7 in), 1.66 metres (5 ft 5 in) and 1.82 metres (6 ft 0 in) diameter

De Hoop (English: The Hope) is a smock mill in Holwerd, Friesland, Netherlands which was built in the 1730s and is working for trade. The mill is listed as a Rijksmonument, number 38709.

== History ==
The earliest record of a windmill in Hollum is c1399, when the windrecht (English: right to wind) was mentioned on page 292 of the Zoenbrief en Accoord between Count Albrecht van Beieren and the Frisian people. An "old and established town" near Dokkum is mentioned in the document, and windmills are also mentioned. It is generally accepted that the town referred to is Holwerd. In 1511, a "mill yard" is mentioned at Holwerd. In 1515, the town was burnt in a battle between the Duke of Gelre and the Duke of Saksen. Amongst the buildings burnt was a dye mill. In 1677, a mill on the town wall was sold for ƒ2,900, a high price for the time.

The earliest record of a mill named De Hoop is that it was standing in 1711. when it was bought for ƒ2,540 by Jan and Jeppe Harmens from Antie Lammerts, widow of miller Oeble Sipkes. In 1713, Jan Harmens sold his share of the mill to Nittert Siemens for ƒ1,170.

In 1715, Siemens sold his share of the mill to Heert Pytters for ƒ4,000. In 1721, Jeppe Harmens took over his father's mill at Lioessens and sold his share in De Hoop to Heert Pytters. Pytters was followed by Harke Sipkes, who was miller in 1728. On 7 January 1729, the mill was sold by auction to Jan Sieverts, who owned a barley mill in the town. He worked the mill until his death in 1732, following which his widow took over the running of the mill. In 1748, the mill was only working at two-thirds capacity as a pair of rye stones had been removed from the mill, the tax on the mill then being assessed at ƒ40 instead of ƒ60. In 1750, the tax reverted to ƒ60, indicating that the barley stones had been replaced. In 1754, Sieverts' son Sijvert Jans Sievert came of age and took the mill. In 1764, the mill was bought by Ids Lieuwes. He worked the mill until his death in 1784, after which his widow Hinke Johannes took the mill.

Luitje Jans van der Meulen was the next miller. He bought the mill in 1811 for ƒ9,500. At this time, an annual ground rent of ƒ4 was payable. He died on 3 November 1826, aged 57. The mill was then worked by his widow Nieske Kadijk until it was sold by auction at De Zwaan, Holwerd on 12 May 1839. At this time, the mill had four pairs of millstones. The stage was 4.50 metres (14 ft 9 in) above ground level and the sails had span of 16.50 metres (54 ft 2 in). The mill was bought for ƒ9,506 by Gerben Willems Hoekstra of Zwaagwesteinde. He was then 31 years old. In 1849, De Hoop was demolished and a new mill built in its place.

On 26 March 1873, Hoekstra's wife Fokelina Kornelis Posthuma died, followed on 29 October 1873 by their daughter Trijntje. In this year, De Hoop was modernised, and a cast-iron windshaft was fitted. Hoekstra died on 5 July 1892 aged 84. His estate was worth ƒ32,567.92, which was then a large sum of money for a miller to leave. The mill was bought at auction for ƒ4,380 by Hoekstra's son Rein Gerbens Hoekstra. He ran the mill until he retired in 1909. The mill was sold for ƒ4,700 to his sone Henricus Hoekstra. Photographs taken c1930 show that the mill was then equipped with one pair of Common sails and one pair of Patent sails. He ran De Hoop until he retired in 1948 aged 70. His son Henricus then took the mill, and ran it with his brother-in-law Pier Faddema. The mill was sold to L O Hiddema & Co in 1954. The internal machinery was dismantled and the mill relegated to use as a store.

In December 1956, the Gemeente Westdongeradeel entered into negotiations with Hiddema with the aim of purchasing the mill for preservation. Hiddema asks at least ƒ10,000 for the mill. In 1962, further negotiations were made, and millwright Jellema of Birdaard was asked to assess the costs of restoration of the mill building only. Plans were made for a foundation to care for the mill once it had been purchased by the Gemeente. On 25 June 1963, the mill was bought by the Gemeente Westdongeradeel for ƒ5,000.

Restorations were undertaken in 1967 and 1971, concentrating on the exterior of the mill at a cost of ƒ70,000. In 1980, the internal machinery was restored and the mill was returned to working order at a cost of ƒ270,000. The mill was officially opened on 30 June 1982. New sails were fitted in 1994 by millwright Jellema of Birdaard. In that year, ownership of De Hoop was transferred to Stichting Monumentenbehoud Dongeradeel. The mill was rethatched in 2009.

== Description ==
De Hoop is what the Dutch describe as a "stellingmolen" . It is a two-storey smock mill on a three-storey base. The stage is at second-floor level, 6.10 metres (20 ft 0 in) above ground level. The smock and cap are thatched. The mill is winded by tailpole and winch. The sails are Common sails. They have a span of 23.65 metres (77 ft 7 in). The sails are carried on a cast-iron windshaft, which was cast in 1873 by L Enthoven & Co, The Hague. The windshaft also carries the brake wheel, which has 62 cogs. This drives the wallower (32 cogs) at the top of the upright shaft. At the bottom of the upright shaft, the great spur wheel, which has 91 cogs. The great spur wheel drives a pair of 1.40 metres (4 ft 7 in) diameter Cullen millstones via a lantern pinion stone nut which has 24 staves. There are also two pairs of millstones used for producing pearl barley, each is driven via a lantern pinion stone nut which has 24 staves. The millstones are 1.66 metres (5 ft 5 in) and 1.82 metres (6 ft 0 in) diameter.

== Millers ==
- Oeble Sipkes
- Antie Lammerts −1711
- Jan Harmens 1711–18
- Jeppe Harmens 1711–21
- Nuttert Sijmons 1713–15
- Heert Pytters 1715–28
- Harke Sipkes 1728–29
- Jan Sieverts 1729–32
- Mrs Sieverts 1732–54
- Sijvert Jans Sieverts 1754–64
- Ids Lieuwes 1764–84
- Hinke Johannes 1784–1811
- Luitje Jans van der Meulen 1811–26
- Nieske Kadijk 1826–39
- Gerben Willems Hoekstra 1839–92
- Rein Hoekstra 1892–1909
- Henricus Hoekstra Sr 1909–48
- Henricus Hoekstra Jr 1948–54
- Pier Feddema 1948–54

References for above:-

== Public access ==
De Hoop is open to the public on Saturday mornings, and at other times by appointment.
