= De Edensermolen =

Smock mill in Iens, Friesland, Netherlands

De Edensermolen, Iens
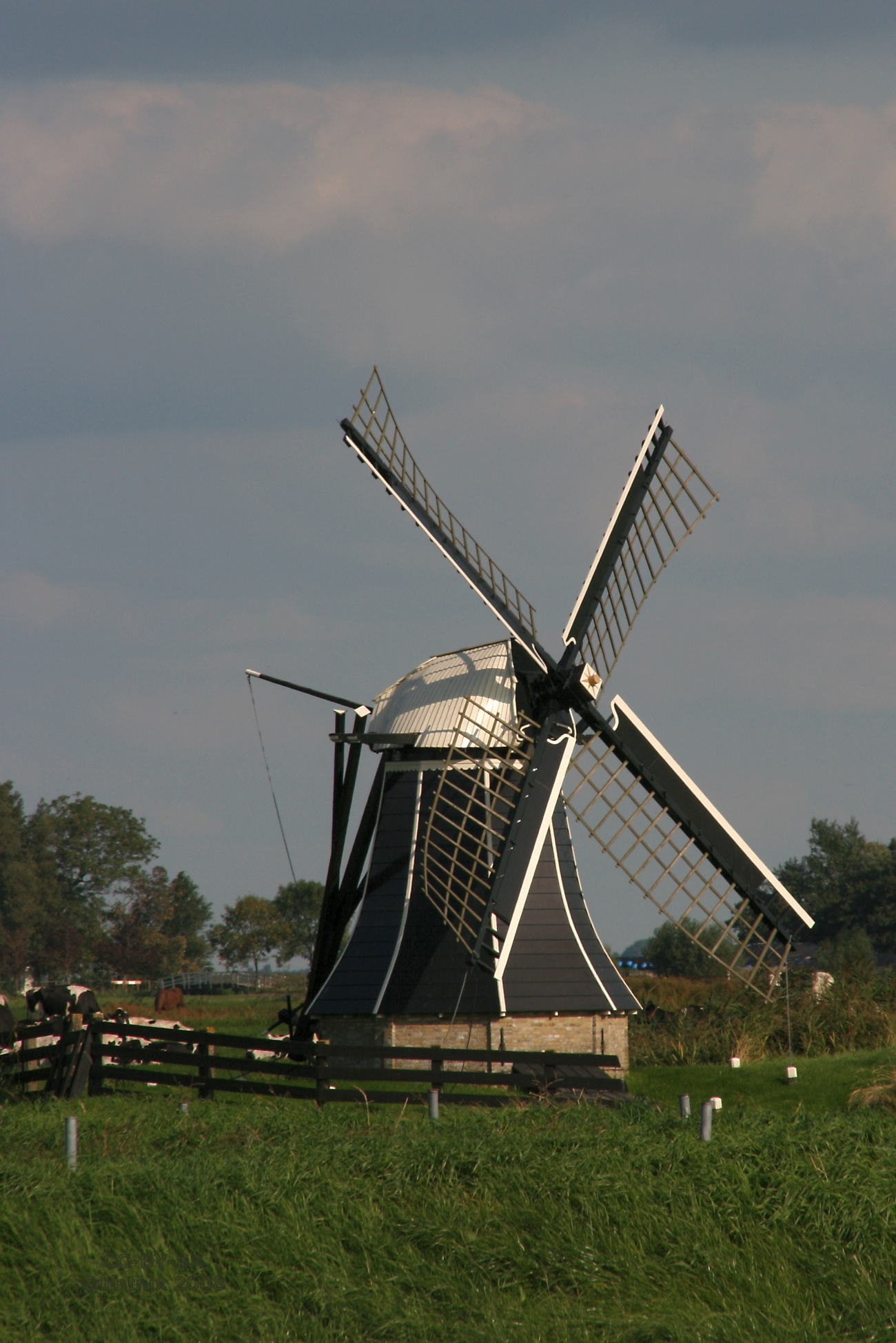
- De Edensermolen, September 2008

Origin
- Mill name: De Edensermolen
- Mill location: Nabij Hegerslaan 3, 8733 EM Iens
- Coordinates: 53°07′10″N 5°36′25″E
- Operator(s): Stichting De Fryske Mole
- Year built: 1847

Information
- Purpose: Drainage mill
- Type: Smock mill
- Storeys: Two-storey smock
- Base storeys: Single-storey base
- Smock sides: Eight sides
- No. of sails: Four sails
- Type of sails: Common sails
- Windshaft: wood
- Winding: Tailpole and winch
- Type of pump: Archimedes' screw

De Edensermolen is a smock mill in Iens, Friesland, Netherlands which was built in 1847. The mill has been restored to working order. It is listed as a Rijksmonument, number 21575.

== History ==
De Edensermolen was built in 1847 to drain the Breeuwsma Polder. It was restored in 1958. A new pair of sails were required to replace those damaged in a storm. A secondhand pair were fitted, bringing the cost of the restoration down from an anticipated ƒ765 to ƒ485. The mill was sold to Stichting De Fryske Mole (English: Frisian Mills Foundation) on 13 October 1977. In 1995, it was restored to full working order. In 2006, the mill was officially designated by Wetterskap Fryslân as being held in reserve for use in times of emergency.

== Description ==
De Edensermolen is what the Dutch describe as an grondzeiler. It is a two-storey smock mill on a single-storey base. There is no stage, the sails reaching almost to the ground. The mill is winded by tailpole and winch. The smock is covered in horizontal boards, while those on the cap are vertical. The sails are Common sails. They have a span of 10.00 metres (32 ft 10 in). The sails are carried on a wooden windshaft. The windshaft also carries the brake wheel which has 32 cogs. This drives the wallower (17 cogs) at the top of the upright shaft. At the bottom of the upright shaft, the crown wheel, which has 26 cogs drives a gearwheel with 25 cogs on the axle of the Archimedes' screw. The axle of the Archimedes' screw is 250 millimetres (10 in) diameter. The screw is 750 millimetres (2 ft 6 in) diameter and 3.80 metres (12 ft 6 in) long. It is inclined at 24°. Each revolution of the screw lifts 114 litres (25 imp gal) of water.

== Public access ==
De Edensermolen is open by appointment.
