= Húns =

Huins Húns
- Village
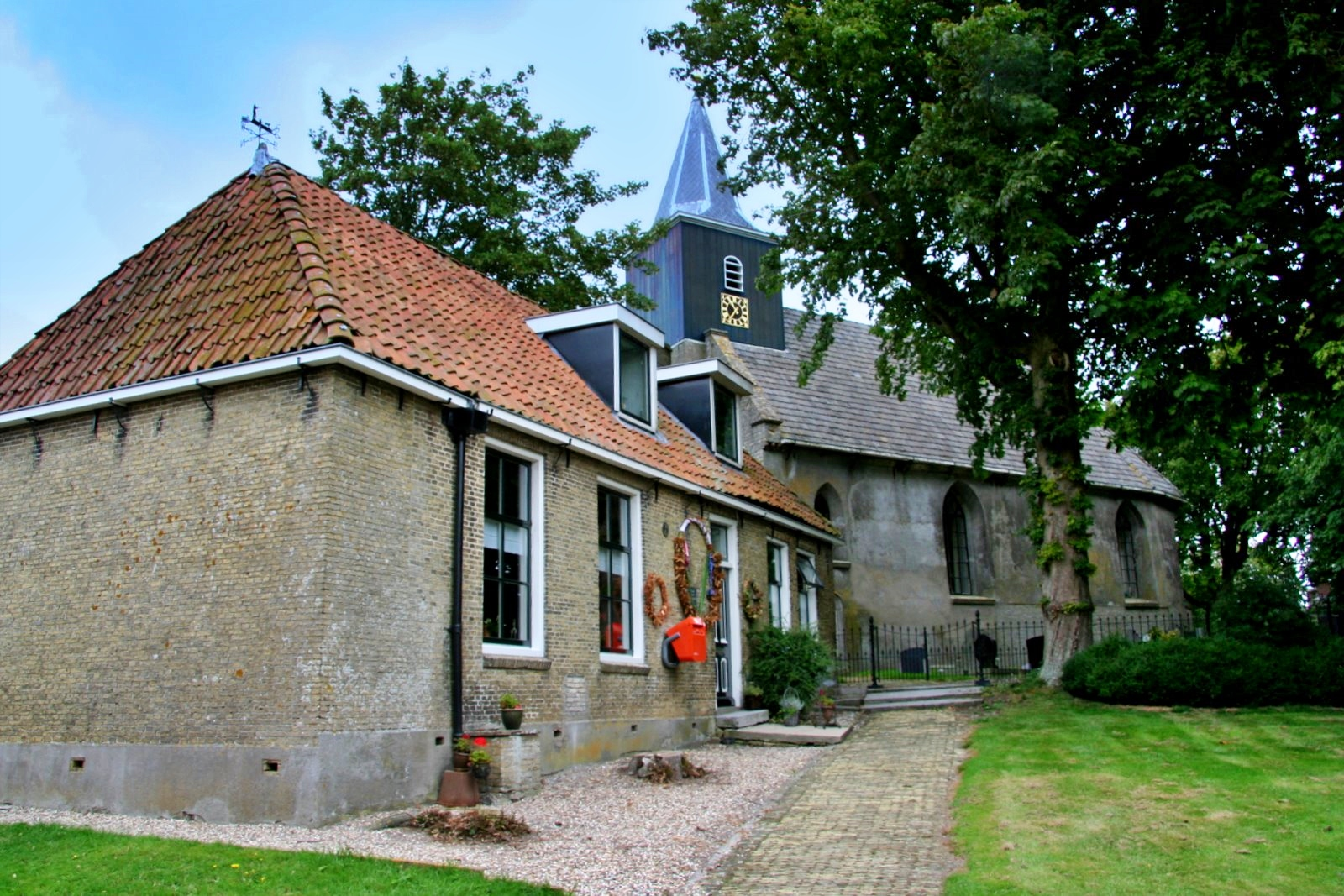
- Húns church

- Flag Coat of arms

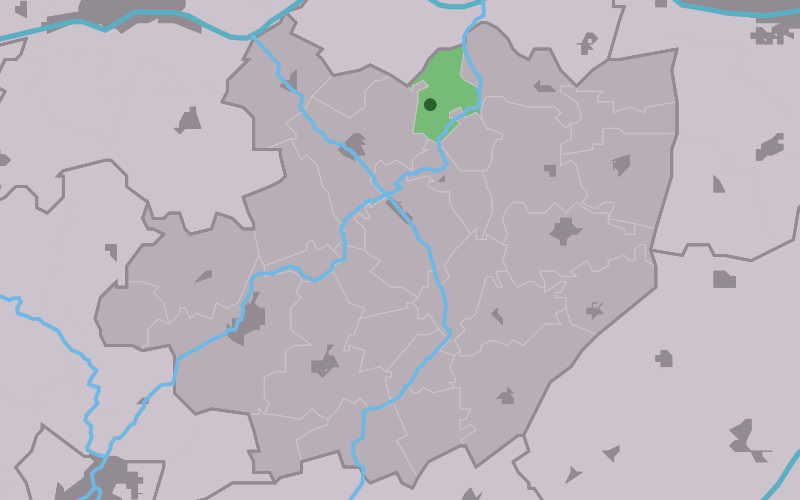
- Location in the former Littenseradiel municipality

- Location in the Netherlands Huins (Netherlands)
- Country: Netherlands
- Province: Friesland
- Municipality: Leeuwarden

Area
  - Total: 3.18 km^{2} (1.23 sq mi)
- Elevation: 0.3 m (0.98 ft)

Population (2021)
  - Total: 105
  - Density: 33.0/km^{2} (85.5/sq mi)
- Time zone: UTC+1 (CET)
  - Summer (DST): UTC+2 (CEST)
- Postal code: 8832
- Dialing code: 0517

Húns (Dutch: Huins) is a village in Leeuwarden in the province of Friesland, the Netherlands. It had a population of around 114 in January 2017.

There is a preserved windmill, De Huinsermolen.

== History ==
The village was first mentioned in the 13th century Hunenghe, and means "settlement of the people of Huno (person)". Húns is a twin village with Leons and both share a village flag. The Dutch Reformed church dates from the 13th century. In 1840, Húns was home to 117 people.

The polder mill De Huinsermolen was built in 1829. The mill drains the excess water from the polder. In 1958, a diesel-powered pumping station was installed, however the windmill is regularly in service.

Before 2018, the village was part of the Littenseradiel municipality and before 1984 it belonged to Baarderadeel municipality.

== Gallery ==
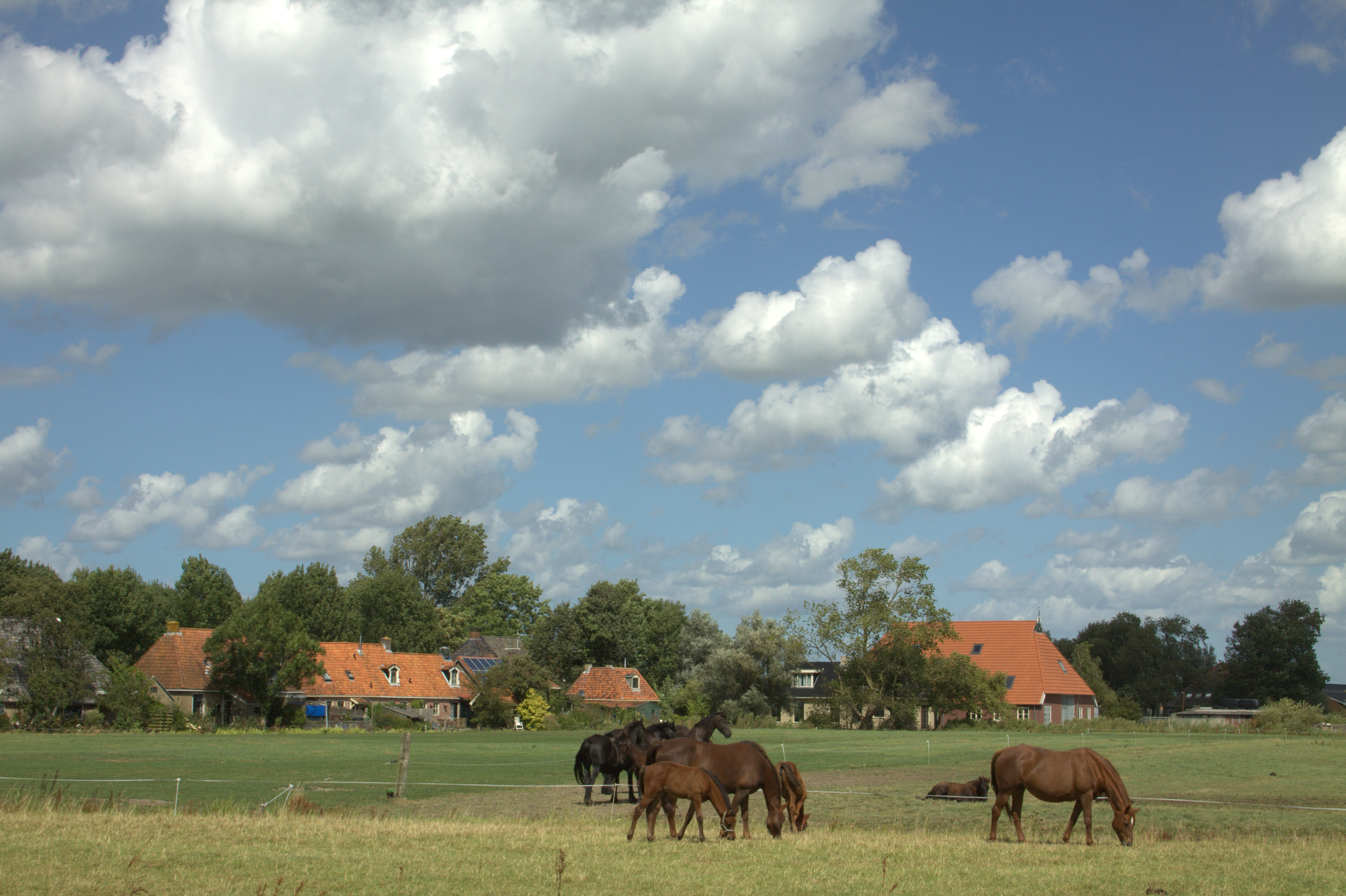
View on Húns

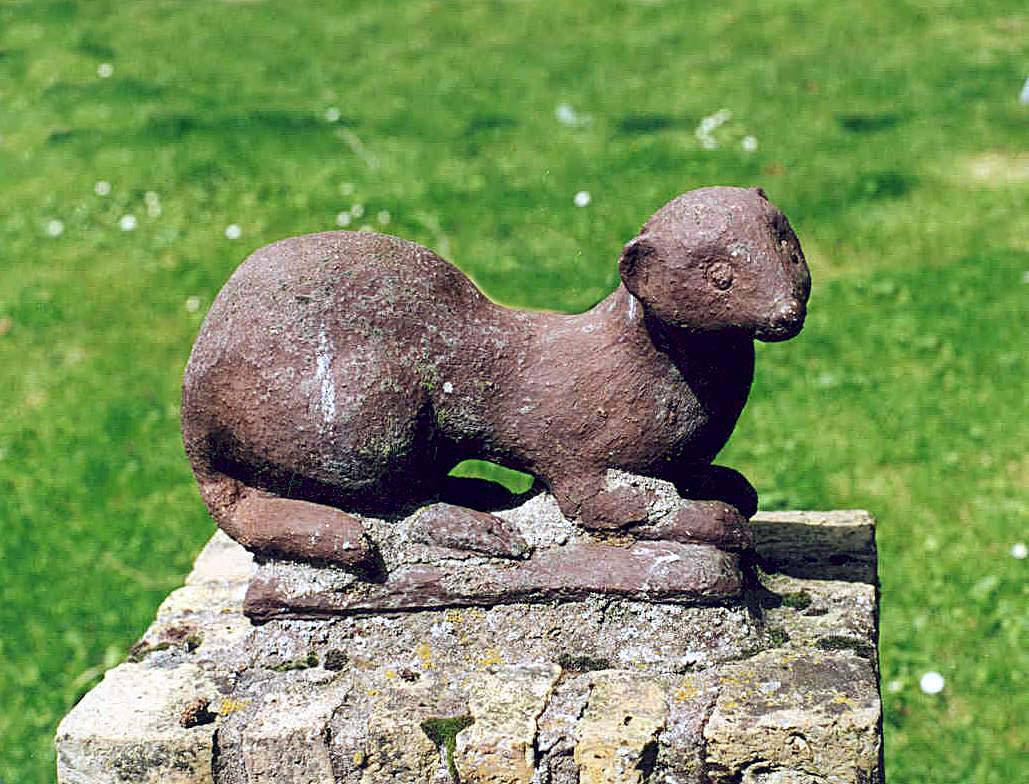
Marten statue

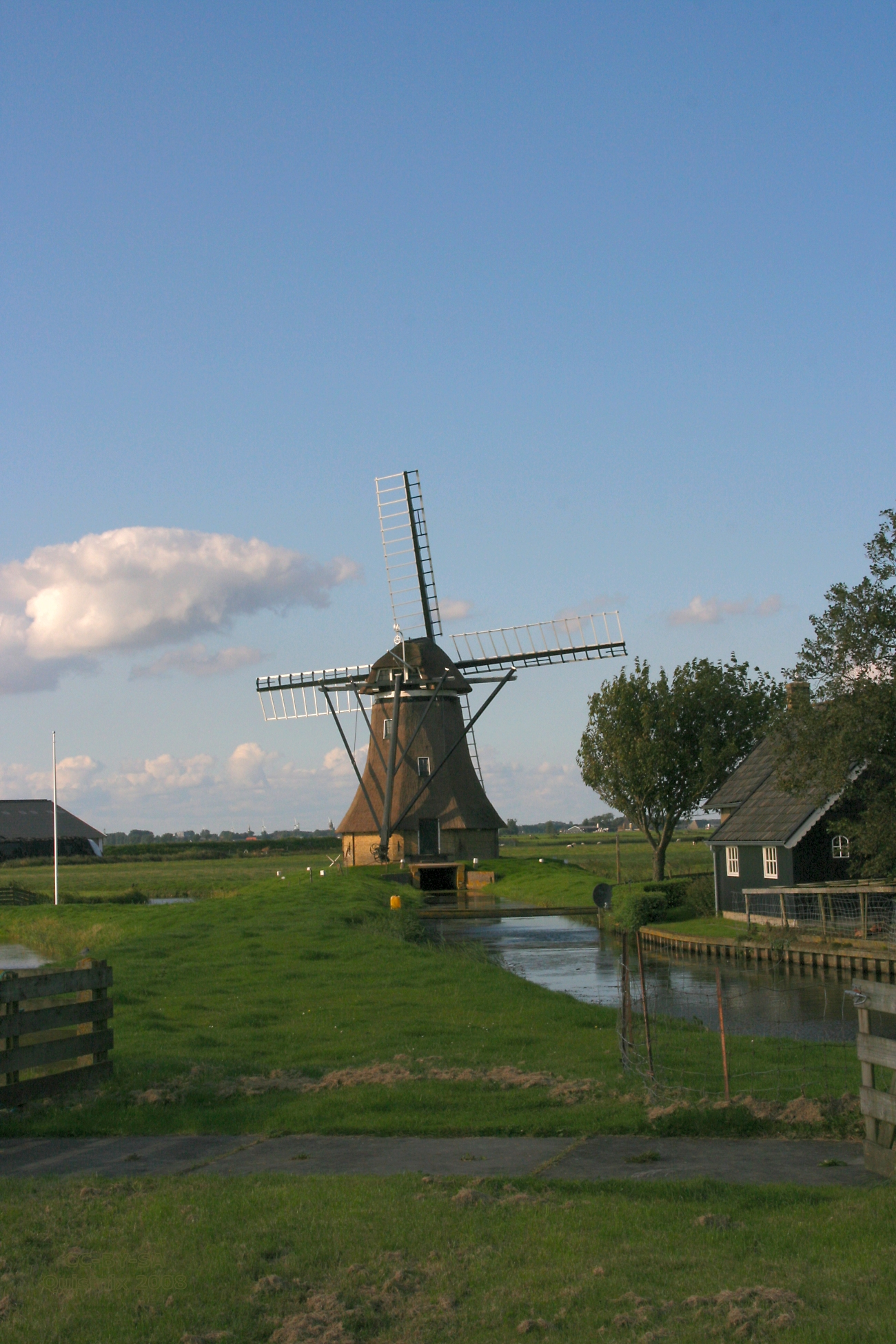
Windmill De Huinsermolen

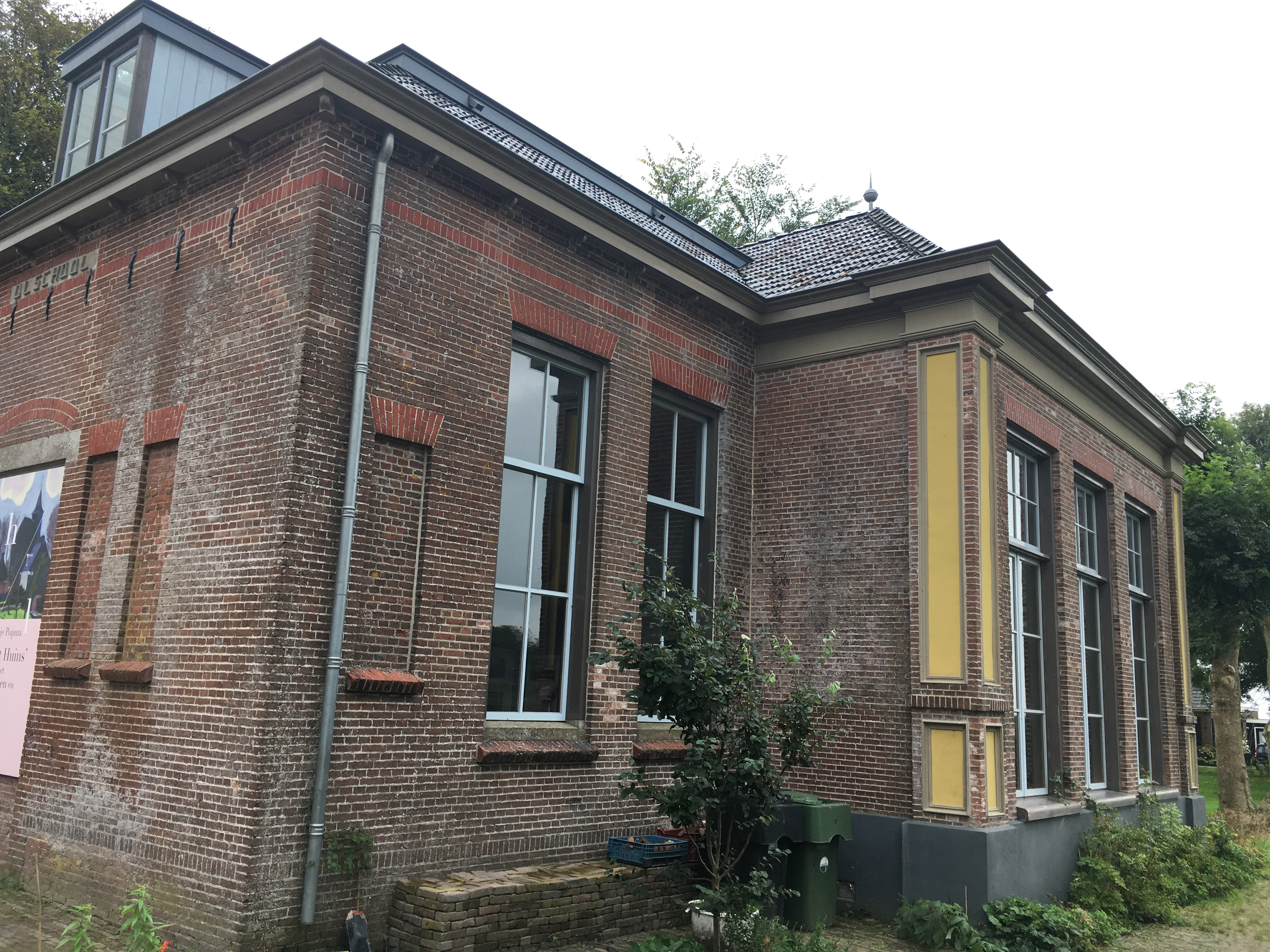
Former school
