= Aylvapoldermolen =

Smock mill in the Netherlands

Aylvapoldermolen, Burgwerd
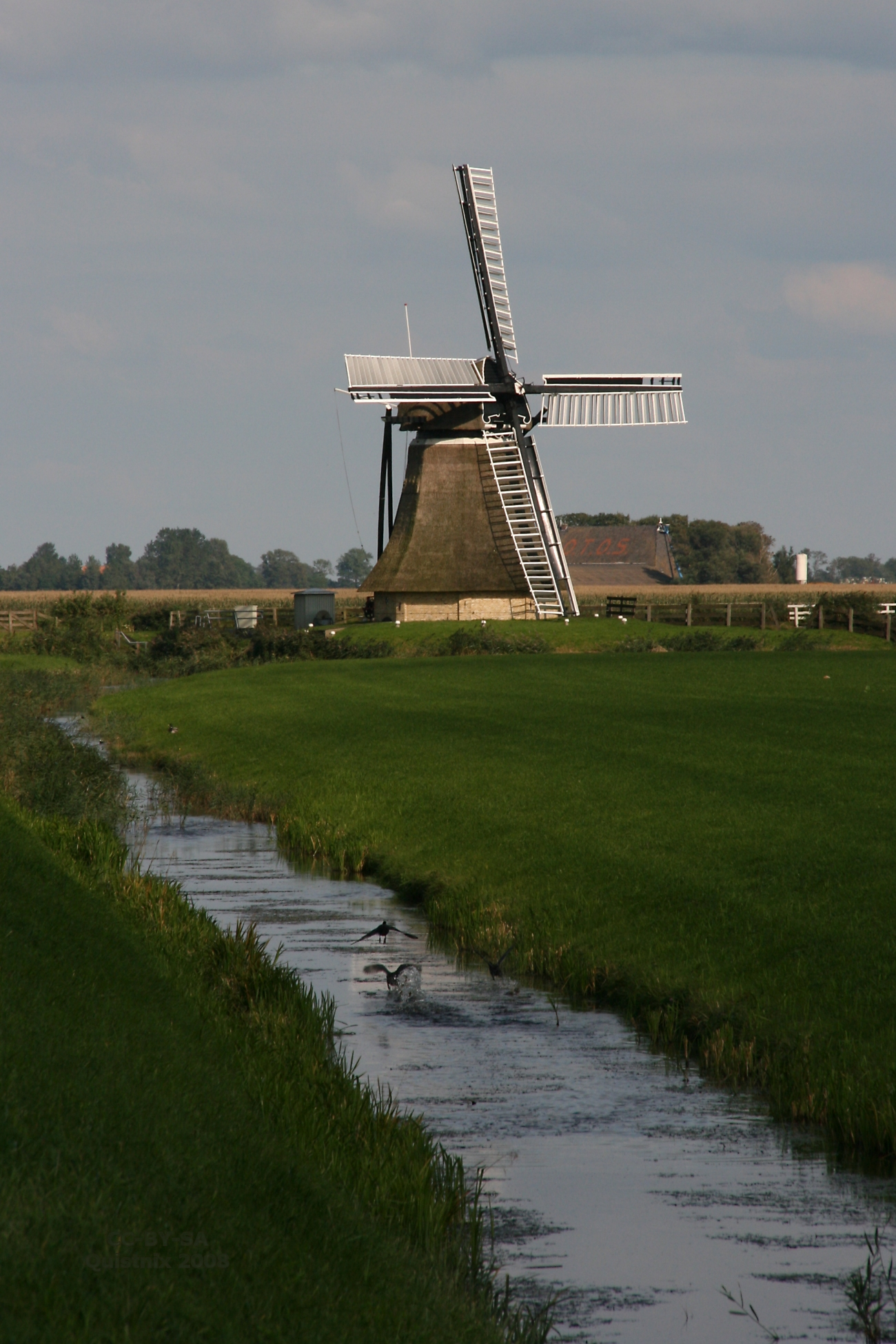
- Aylvapoldermolen, September 2008

Origin
- Mill name: Aylvapoldermolen
- Mill location: Bij Bolswardertrekvaart, 8742 Burgwerd
- Coordinates: 53°17′45″N 5°52′53″E
- Operator(s): Stichting Aylvapoldermolen
- Year built: 2000

Information
- Purpose: Drainage mill
- Type: Smock mill
- Storeys: Three-storey smock
- Base storeys: One-storey base
- Smock sides: Eight sides
- No. of sails: Four sails
- Type of sails: Patent sails
- Windshaft: Cast iron
- Winding: Tailpole and winch
- Type of pump: Archimedes' screw

Aylvapoldermolen (English: Aylvapolder mill) is a smock mill in Burgwerd, Friesland, Netherlands which has been restored to working order. The mill is listed as a Rijksmonument, number 15626.

== History ==
The first mill on this site was a smock mill which was built in 1827. The mill was known as the Molen van de Tjaard. It drained the Aylvapolder, which was the first polder established in Friesland in 1680. On 9 November 1959 the mill was burnt down.

The present Aylvapoldermolen was built at Hallum in 1846. It was known as the Vijfhuistermolen or the Hoekstermolen. The mill was restored in 1964 and again in 1971. On 4 May 1976 it was sold to Stichting De Fryske Mole (English: Frisian Mills Foundation). In 1989, the Stichting Aylvapoldermolen (English: Aylva polder mill foundation) was set up with the aim of rebuilding a windmill on the site of the lost mill. It was suggested in 1996 that the Vijfhuistermolen would be a suitable candidate as a replacement because the land it stood on was needed for the expansion of a business in Hallum. The mill was dismantled in 1999 and re-erected in Burgwerd on the site of the original Aylvapoldermolen. The official opening ceremony was performed on 3 June 2009 by Mrs Annemarie Jorritsma, at that time the Minister van Economische Zaken. Mrs Jorritsma is the daughter of a miller. On 20 August 2009, the mill was struck by lightning and set on fire. The fire brigade was able to confine the damage to the thatch on the cap. The mill is equipped with an automatic sprinkler system. The fire brigade used 135,000 litres (30,000 imp gal) of water to extinguish the fire. About 6 square metres (65 sq ft) of thatch was destroyed.

== Description ==
The Aylvapoldermolen is what the Dutch describe as an "achtkante grondzeiler". It is a smock mill without a stage, the sails reaching almost to the ground. The brick base is one storey high with a three-storey smock on top. Both smock and cap are thatched. The four Patent sails, which have a span of 22.00 metres (72 ft 2 in) are carried on a cast-iron windshaft. The windshaft also carries the brake wheel which has 57 cogs. This drives the wallower (32 cogs) at the top of the upright shaft. At the lower end of the upright shaft the crown wheel (53 cogs) drives the steel Archimedes' screw via a gear wheel with 48 cogs. The axle of the Archimedes' screw is 660 millimetres (2 ft 2 in) diameter and the Archimedes' screw is 1.70 metres (5 ft 7 in) diameter. It is inclined at 22½°. Each revolution of the Archimedes' screw lifts 1,560 litres (340 imp gal) of water.

== Public access ==
The mill is open to the public by appointment.
