= Durkje Huitema =

Dutch speed skater

Personal information
- Born: 8 July 1918 Wommels, Netherlands
- Died: 11 May 2010 (aged 91)

Sport
- Country: Netherlands
- Sport: Speed skating (kortebaan)

Durkje Huitema (8 July 1918 – 11 May 2010) was a Dutch female kortebaan speed skater.

== Biography ==
Huitema was born in Wommels, the daughter of Johannes Huitema and IJbeltje Jellema. She had three sisters and a brother.

Huitema was trained to skate by her father. To stay fit in the summer, she swam at the “Bolswarder zweminrichting” and performed gymnastics during the winter.

Huitema won her first speed skating competition as a schoolgirl in 1929, winning 1 gulden. She continued speed skating and worked on her technique. Three years later, in 1932, she won her next prize: the third place at IJsbrechtum winning 3 Guilder. In the winter of 1933, in her hometown, she won three prizes in a row, on 9 December the first prize at a club's pairs competition, 11 December the first prize at a pairs competition with Eelkje de Groot and on 14 December the third prize. Due to her results she achieved confidence in herself and with the support of her father she started competing at individual competitions. On 17 December she won a girls competition of 75 girls in Grouw, a golden watch. The next day she won a competition of 22 women in Heeg. She was promoted to the women’s category, and was not further permitted to compete in girls’ competitions. Not a big deal, as there was no ice in the following winters. Back on the ice again she won on 12 February 1936 the first prize, plus medal, in Burgwerd. On 30 February 1936 she won the third prize behind Trijntje Hemminga.

In December 1938 she won two first prizes and a consolation prize. The next winter, she won among others the first prize in Heeg, two second prizes, a third prize and a consolation prize. One of the second prizes was on 7 January 1940 in Stiens, beaten by Antje Koopmans.

In the winter of 1940-41 she won a total of 100 Guilder in prize money. Among others she won the third prize in Sneek, beaten by Ilkje Nienhuis and Sytske Pasveer in January 1941.

Huitema was married on 14 May 1946 to Sjoerd Bouke Buwalde and moved to Bolsward. After her marriage she continued with speed skating. She emigrated to Australia, where she arrived on 17 August 1950 in Fremantle. In 1961 she lived in Newborough, Australia. Huitema died on 11 May 2020, aged 91.

== Achievements ==
incomplete after December 1939

1929–30
1st prize (f 1) - 1929, girls’ school competition

1932–33
3rd price (f 3) - 1932 in IJsbrechtum

1933–34
1st prize (f 12) - 9 December 1933 in Wommels, pairs competition (ice club members)
1st prize (f 40) - 11 December 1933 in Wommels, pairs competition (with Eelke de Groot)
3rd prize (f 7.5) - 14 December 1933 in Wommels, individual competition
1st prize (Golden watch) - 17 December 1933 in Grouw, girls’ competition (75 participants)
1st prize (f 20) - 18 December 1933 in Heeg, individual women’s competition (22 participants)

1935–36
3rd prize (f 20) - 30 January 1936, behind Trijntje Hemminga
1st prize (f 25) + medal - 12 February 1936 in Burgwerd

1938–39
1st consolation prize (f 20) - 21 December 1938 in Arum
1st prize (f 20) - 23 December 1938 in Heidenschap
1st prize (f 20) - 26 December 1938 in Mantgum

1939–40
1st prize - 21 December 1939 in Heeg
3rd prize - 29 December 1939 in Workum
2nd prize - in Oosterwierum
2nd prize (f 40) - 7 January 1940 in Stiens (behind Antje Koopmans)
1st consolation prize - 9 January 1940 in Hitzum

1940–41

this winter she won a total of f 100 in prize money

3rd prize (f 15) - 4 January 1941 in Sneek (behind Ilkje Nienhuis and Sytske Pasveer)
2nd consolation prize (f 15) - January 1941 in Oudkerk
