= Huitema =

Huitema is a Dutch surname. Notable people with the surname include:

- Christian Huitema (born 1953), French computer scientist
- Durkje Huitema (1918–2010), Dutch speed skater
- Jan Huitema (born 1984), Dutch politician
- Jordyn Huitema (born 2001), Canadian soccer player
- Lammert Huitema (born 1961), Dutch speed skater and cyclist
