= De Hiemerter Mole, Burgwerd =

Hollow post mill in Friesland, Netherlands

De Heimerter Mole, Burgwerd
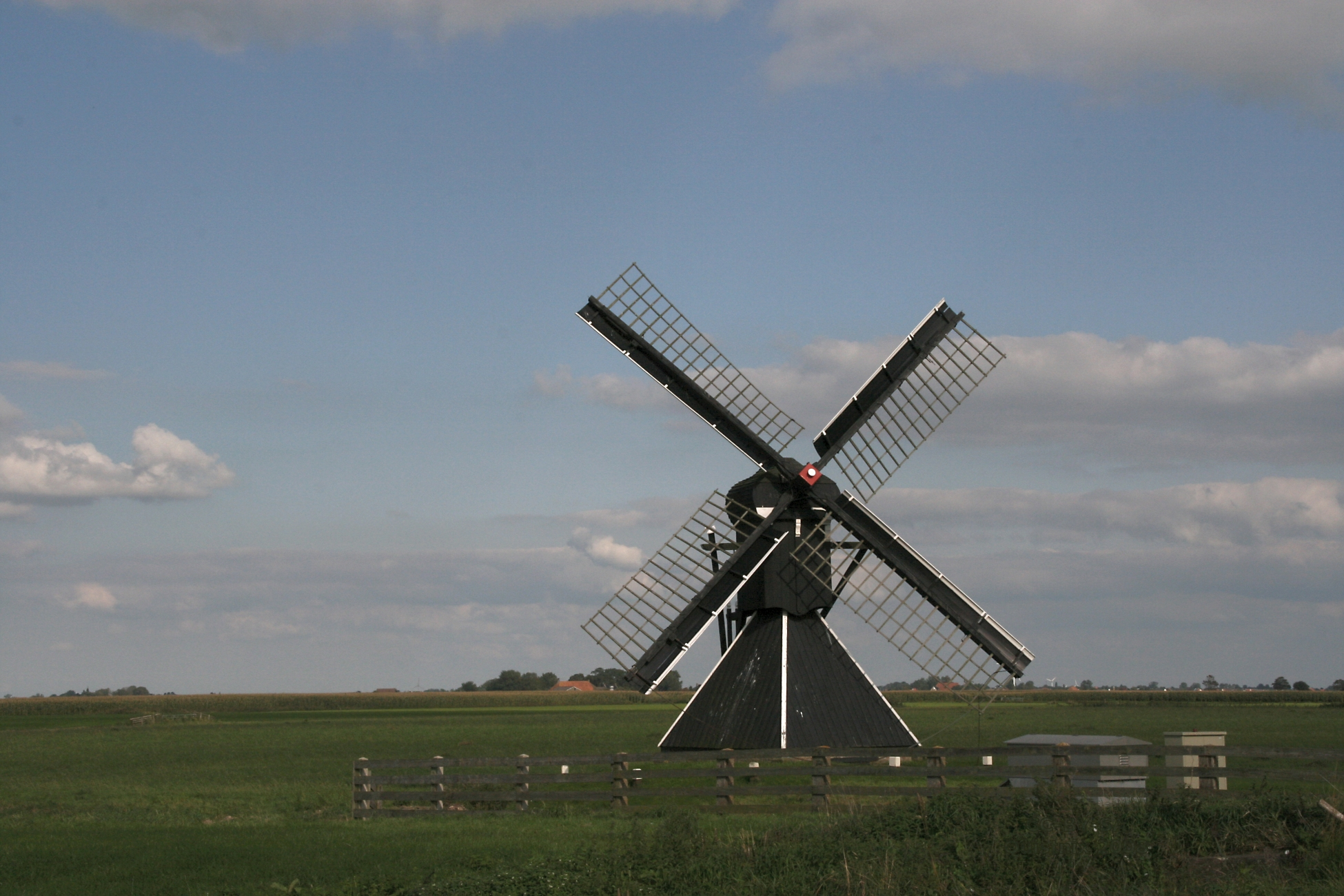
- De Heimerter Mole, September 2008

Origin
- Mill name: De Heimerter Mole
- Mill location: Hemert 13, 8742 KH Burgwerd
- Coordinates: 53°06′00″N 5°31′08″E
- Operator(s): Stichting de Fryske Mole
- Year built: 1811

Information
- Purpose: Drainage mill
- Type: Hollow post mill
- Roundhouse storeys: One storey roundhouse
- No. of sails: Four sails
- Type of sails: Common sails
- Windshaft: Cast iron
- Winding: Winch
- Auxiliary power: Diesel engine
- Type of pump: Archimedes' screw

De Heimerter Mole is a hollow post mill in Burgwerd, Friesland, Netherlands which has been restored to working order. The mill is listed as a Rijksmonument, number 39348.

== History ==
In 1811, the mill was built to drain the Heimerter Polder, which had an area of 385 pondemaat (141 ha; 350 acres). The mill was then owned by the church at Schalsum In 1950, the sails were fitted with streamlined leading edges on the Fok system. In 1957, a diesel engine was installed as auxiliary power and the wooden Archimedes' screw replaced by one of steel. In 1969, the mill ceased work. The diesel engine was removed in the mid-1970s and an automatic pumping station built. In 1973, the mill was bought by De Hollandsche Molen. In 1976, the mill was restored to working order. On 16 May 1988, the mill was sold to Stichting De Fryske Mole (English:Frisian Mills Foundation).

== Description ==
De Heimerter Mole is what the Dutch describe as a "spinnenkopmolen" (English: Spider mill). It is a small hollow post mill winded by a winch. The four Common sails, which have a span of 12.00 metres (39 ft 4 in), are carried in a wooden windshaft. The windshaft also carries the brake wheel which has 29 cogs. This drives the wallower (16 cogs) at the top of the upright shaft, which passed through the main post. At the bottom of the upright shaft, the crown wheel (31 cogs) drives the Archimedes' screw via a gear wheel with 29 pegs. The Archimedes' screw has an axle diameter of 407 millimetres (16 in) and is 950 millimetres (3 ft 1 in) diameter overall. Its length is 3.95 metres (13 ft 0 in). It is inclined at an angle of 28°. Each revolution of the screw lifts 221 litres (49 imp gal) of water.

== Public access ==
De Heimerter Mole is open to the public by appointment.
