= De Schalsumermolen, Schalsum =

Smock mill in Friesland, Netherlands

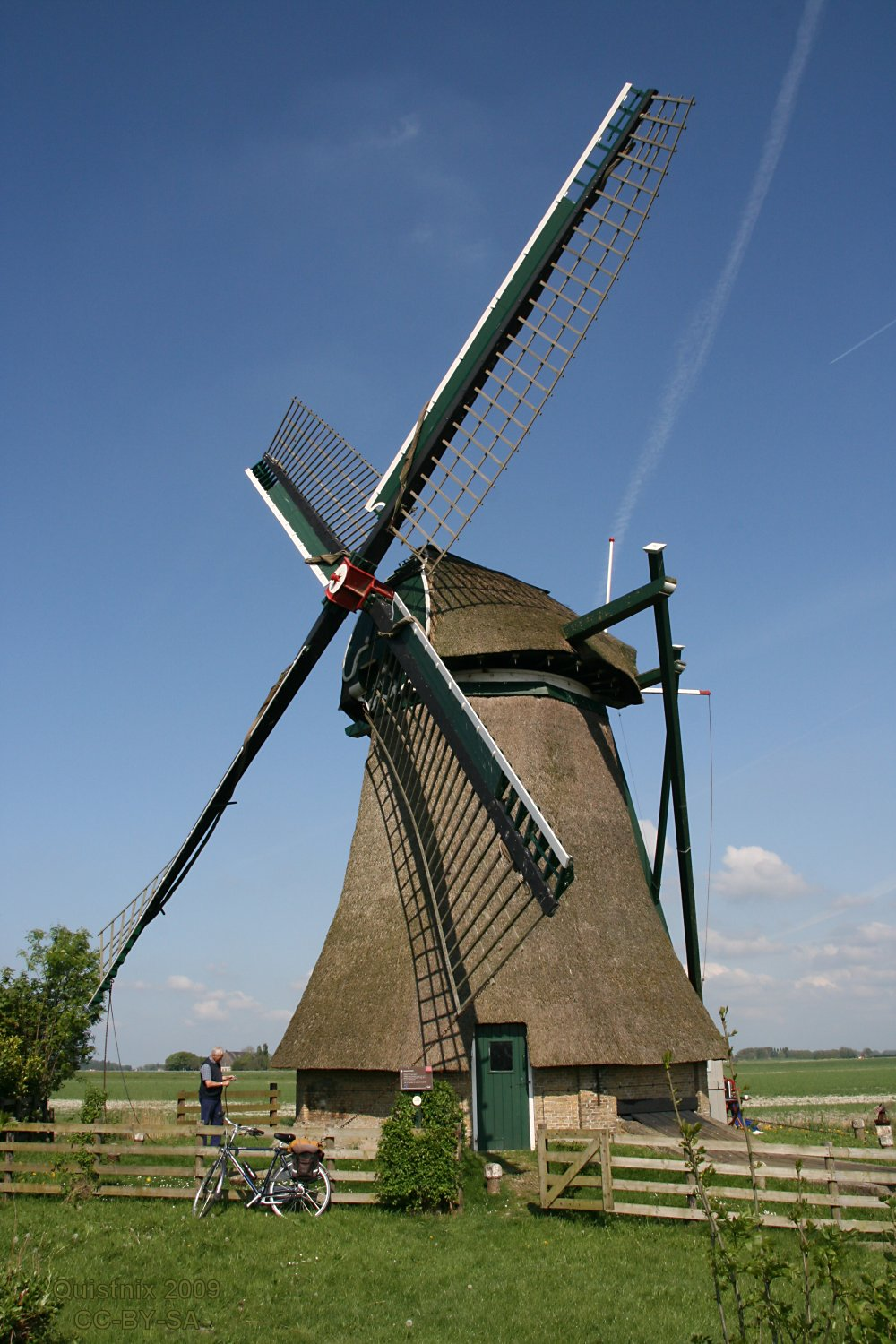
- De Schalsumermolen, May 2009.
- Interactive map of De Schalsumermolen, Schalsum

Origin
- Mill name: De Schalsumermolen
- Mill location: Rijksstraatweg, 8813 JH, Schalsum
- Coordinates: 53°11′41″N 5°35′25″E
- Operator: Stichting De Fryske Mole
- Year built: 1801

Information
- Purpose: Drainage mill
- Type: Smock mill
- Storeys: Two storey smock
- Base storeys: One storey base
- Smock sides: Eight sides
- No. of sails: Four sails
- Type of sails: Common sails
- Windshaft: Cast iron
- Winding: Tailpole and winch
- Type of pump: Archimedes screw

De Schalsumermolen is a smock mill in Schalsum, Friesland, Netherlands which was built in 1801. The mill has been restored to working order. Used as a training mill, it is listed as a Rijksmonument.

== History ==
De Schalsumermolen was built in 1801 to drain the Grote Schalsumer Polder. The mill was working until 1960, and since then it has been maintained in an operable condition, last working in the 1970s. De Schalsumermolen was sold to Stichting De Fryske Mole on 28 December 1977, the 20th mill bought by that organisation. In 1979, the mill was restored. New Common sails were fitted, replacing the previous Patent sails. The mill is listed as a Rijksmonument, No.15880. The mill is used by the Gild Fryske Mounders to train people in the art of working windmills.

== Description ==
De Schalsumermolen is what the Dutch describe as a Grondzeiler. It is a two-storey smock mill on a single storey base. There is no stage, the sails reaching almost to ground level. The mill is winded by tailpole and winch. The smock and cap are thatched. The sails are Common sails. One pair has a span of 20.20 metres (66 ft 3 in), and the other pair 20.23 metres (66 ft 4 in). The sails are carried on a cast iron windshaft, which was cast by Koninklijke Nederlandsche Grofsmederij, Leiden, North Holland in 1901. The windshaft carries the brake wheel which has 55 cogs. This drives the wallower (30 cogs) at the top of the upright shaft. At the bottom of the upright shaft there are two crown wheels The upper crown wheel, which has 42 cogs drives an Archimedes' screw via a crown wheel. The lower crown wheel, which has 36 cogs is carried on the axle of an Archimedes' screw, which is used to drain the polder. The axle of the screw is 59 centimetres (1 ft 11 in) diameter and 4.66 metres (15 ft 3 in) long. The screw is 1.54 metres (5 ft 1 in) diameter. It is inclined at 20.5°. Each revolution of the screw lifts 1,250 litres (270 imp gal) of water.

== Public access ==
De Schalsumermolen is open to the public on Saturday afternoons or by appointment.
