= Easterwierrum =

Easterwierrum Oosterwierum
- Village
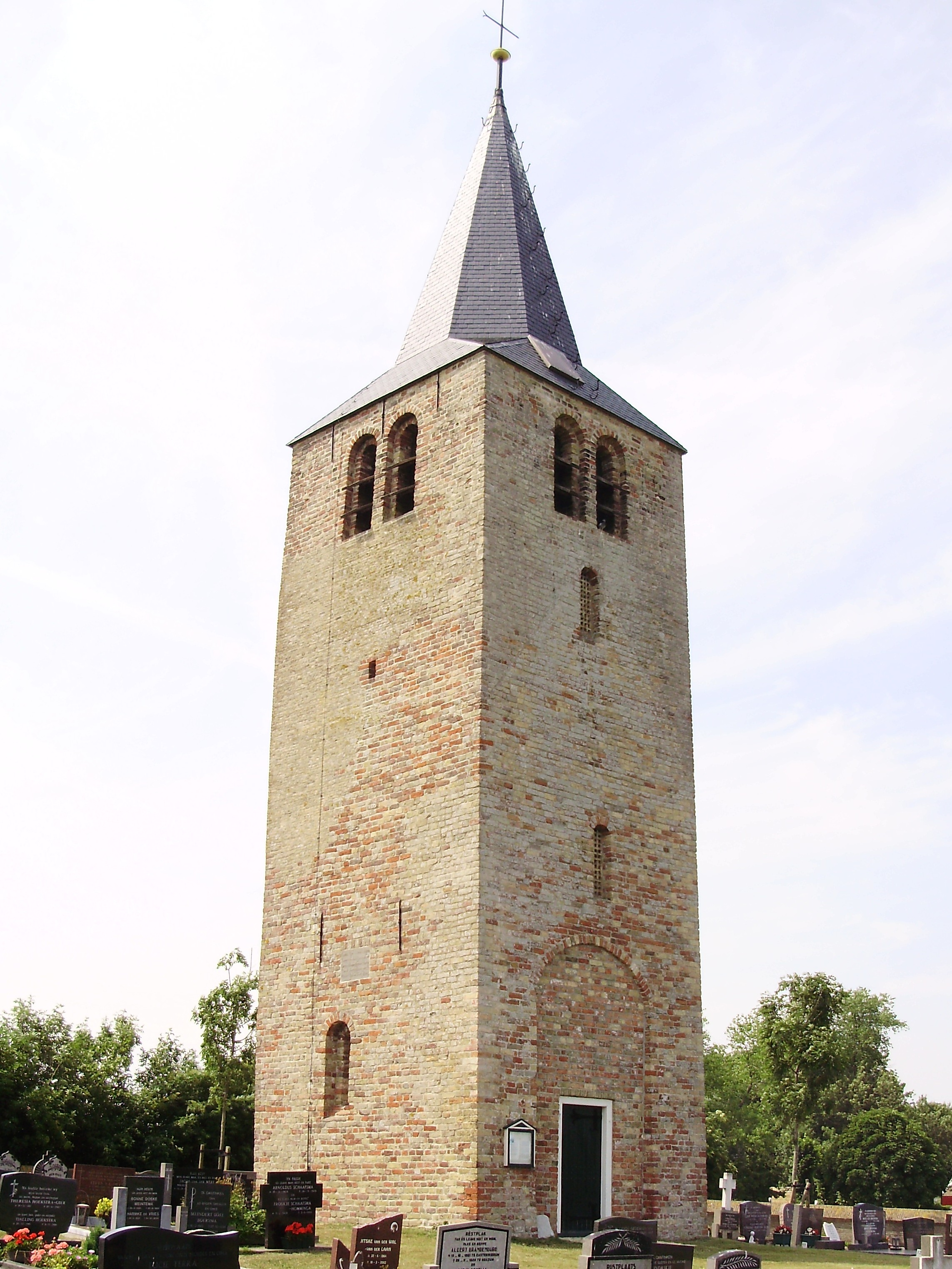
- Church tower

- Coat of arms

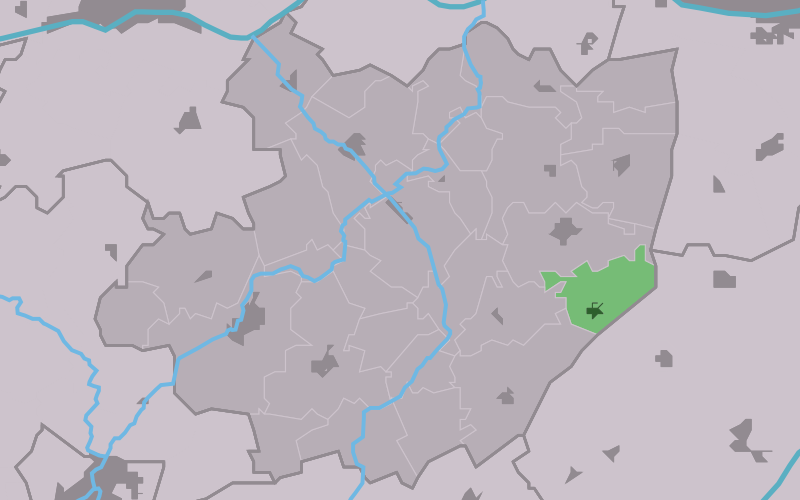
- Location in the former Littenseradiel municipality

- Location in the Netherlands Easterwierrum (Netherlands)
- Country: Netherlands
- Province: Friesland
- Municipality: Súdwest-Fryslân

Area
  - Total: 4.44 km^{2} (1.71 sq mi)
- Elevation: 0.0 m (0 ft)

Population (2021)
  - Total: 320
  - Density: 72/km^{2} (190/sq mi)
- Time zone: UTC+1 (CET)
  - Summer (DST): UTC+2 (CEST)
- Postal code: 9021
- Dialing code: 058
- Website: Official

Easterwierrum (West Frisian pronunciation: [jɛstr̩ˈʋjɪrəm]; Dutch: Oosterwierum) is a village in Súdwest-Fryslân in the province of Friesland, the Netherlands. It had a population of around 332 in January 2017.

== History ==
The village was first mentioned in 1319 as Aesterwerum, and means "settlement on the eastern terp. East has been added to distinguish between Lytsewierrum. Easterwierrum is a terp (artificial living hill) village which developed in the early middle ages.

There is a church tower from the 13th century on an isolated terp to the north of Eatserwierrum. Part of the terp has been excavated. The matching church was destroyed in 1905. The Dutch Reformed church dates from 1895 and has a tower from 1911. The Catholic Saint Wiro Church was built between 1925 and 1926 in Gothic Revival style.

The reason for the isolated church tower is that the village of Easterwierrum moved southwards to the canal during the 18th and 19th century to the a location which used to contain the stins Vogelzang.

Easterwierrum was home to 328 people in 1840.

Before 2018, the village was part of the Littenseradiel municipality.

== Gallery ==
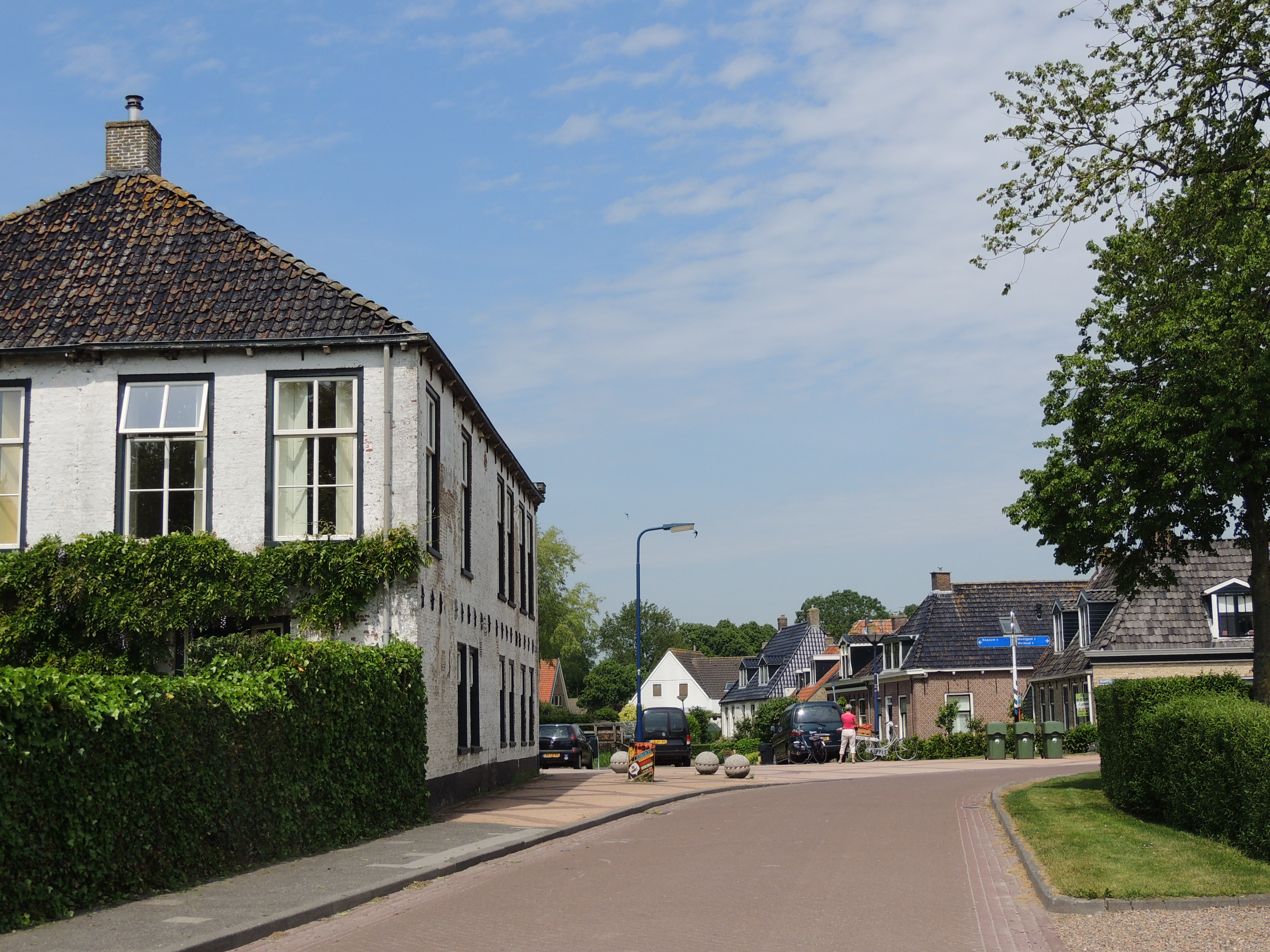
Street view

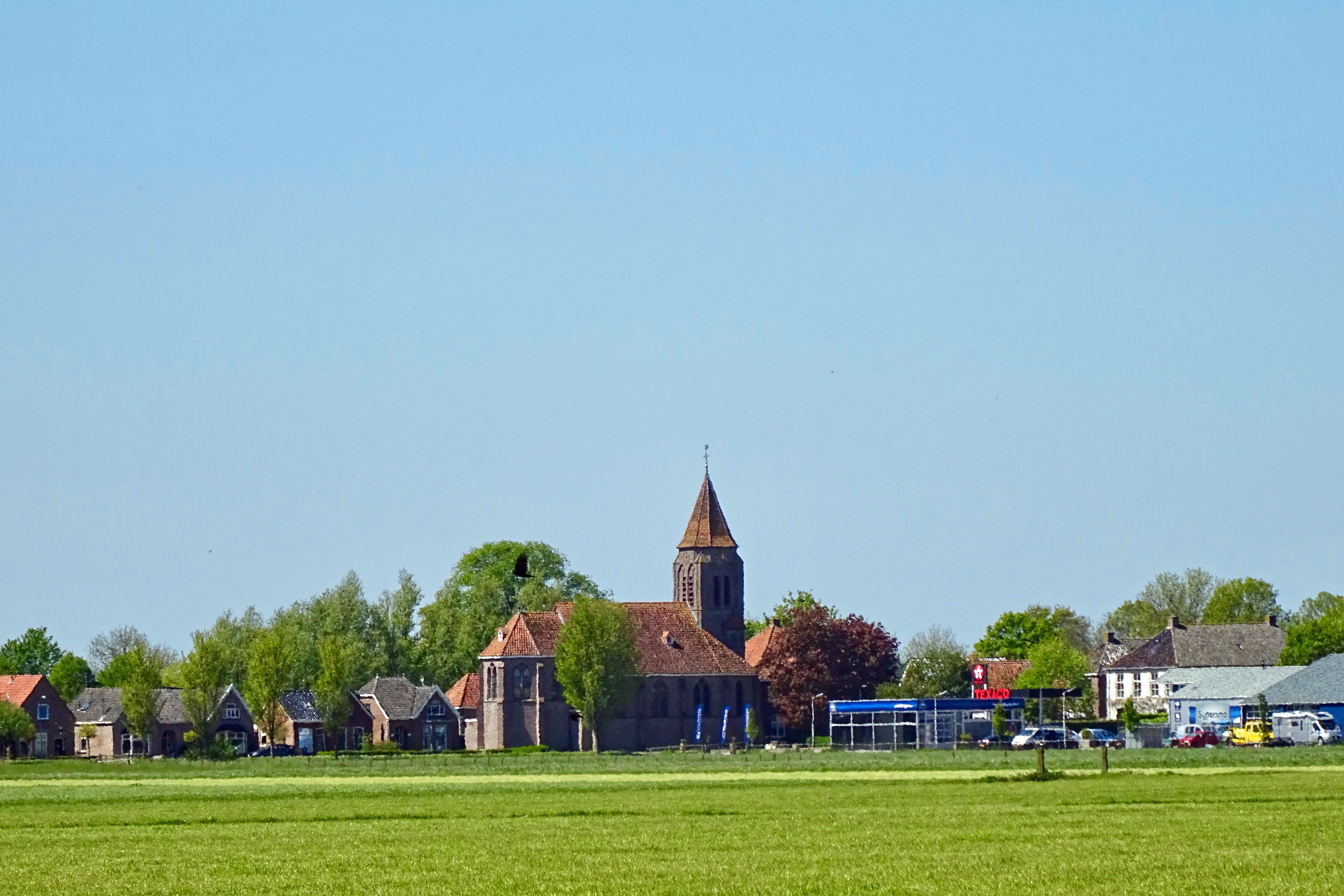
Village view

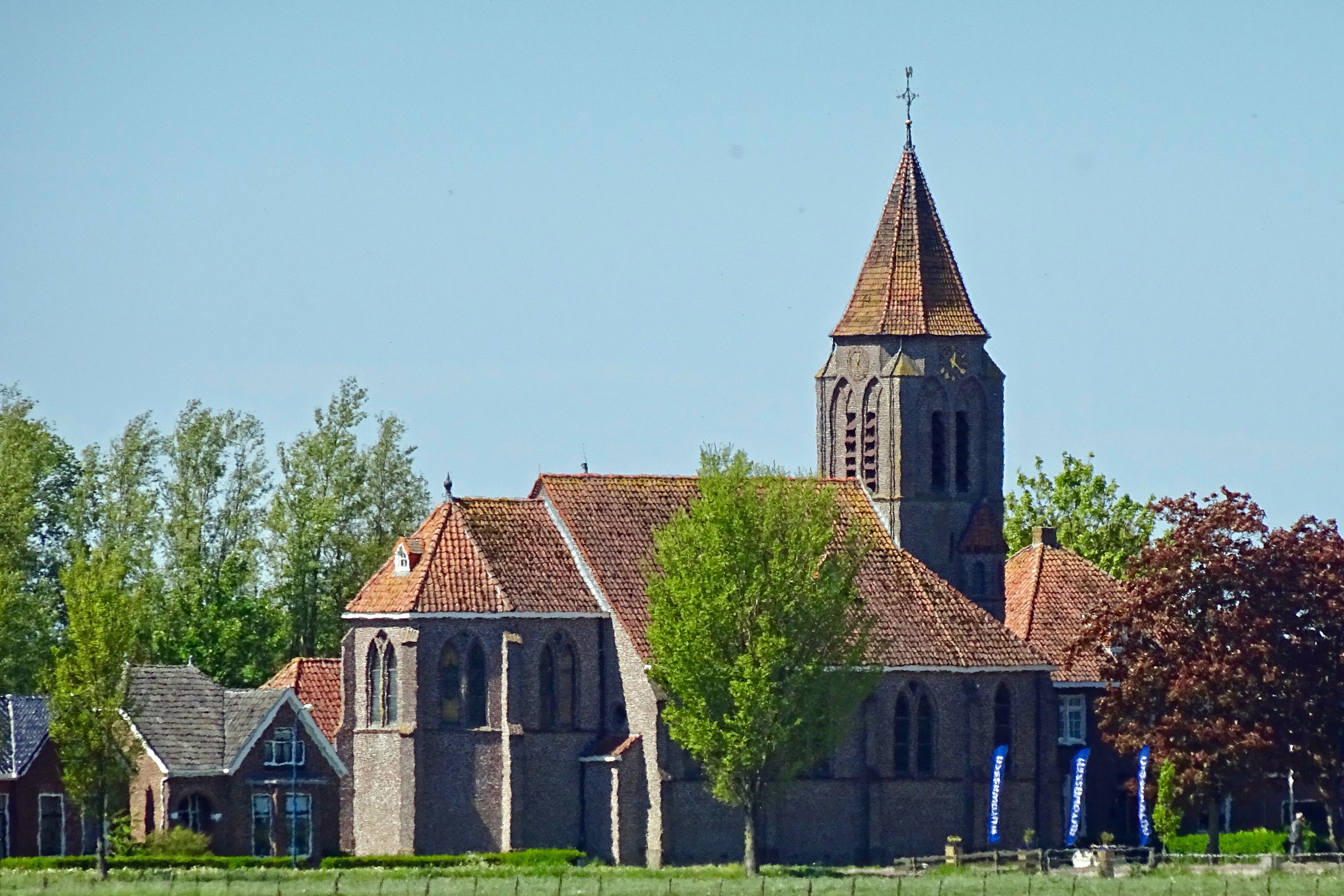
Saint Wiro Church

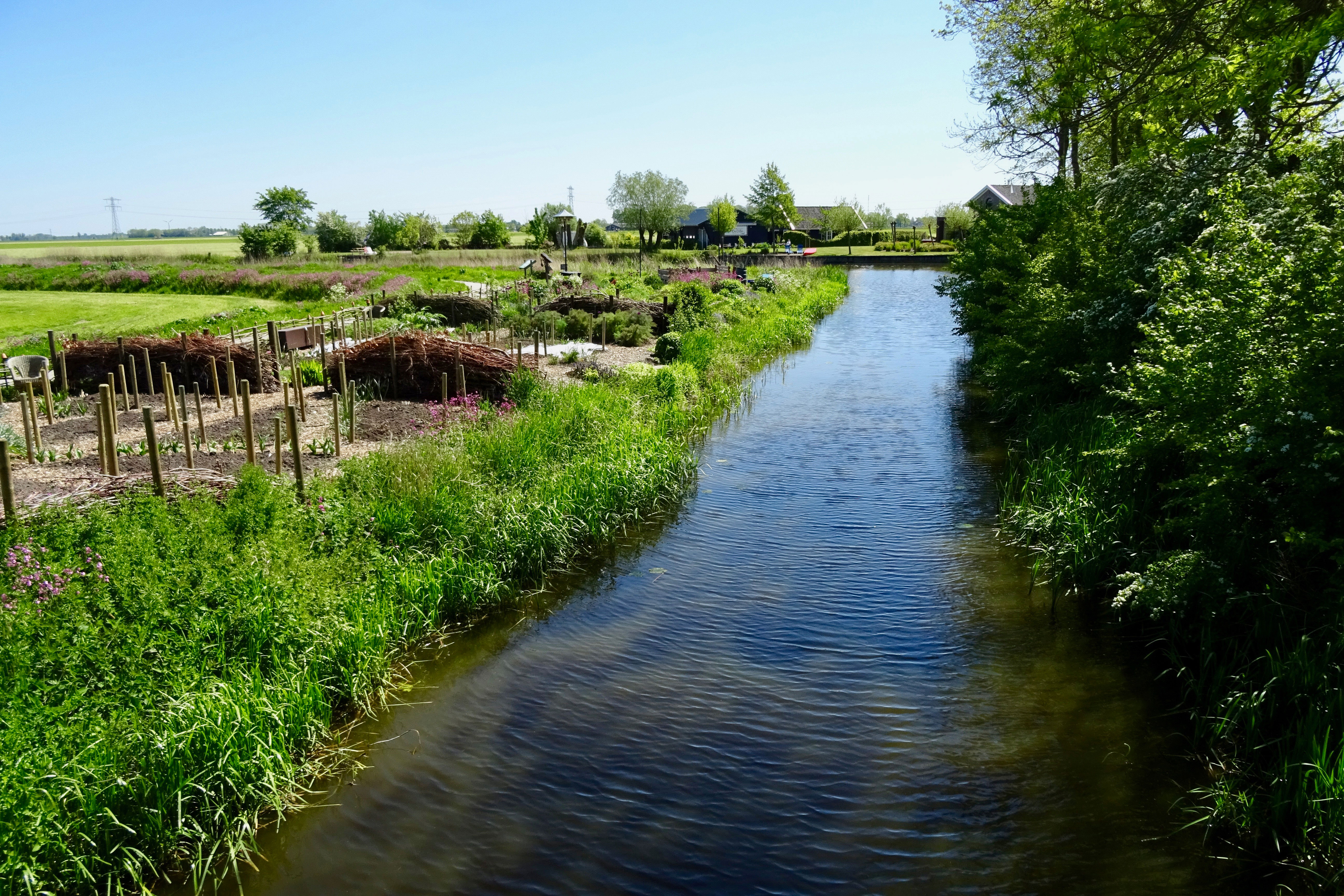
Gardens on the canal
