= Ysbrechtum =

IJsbrechtum Ysbrechtum
- Village
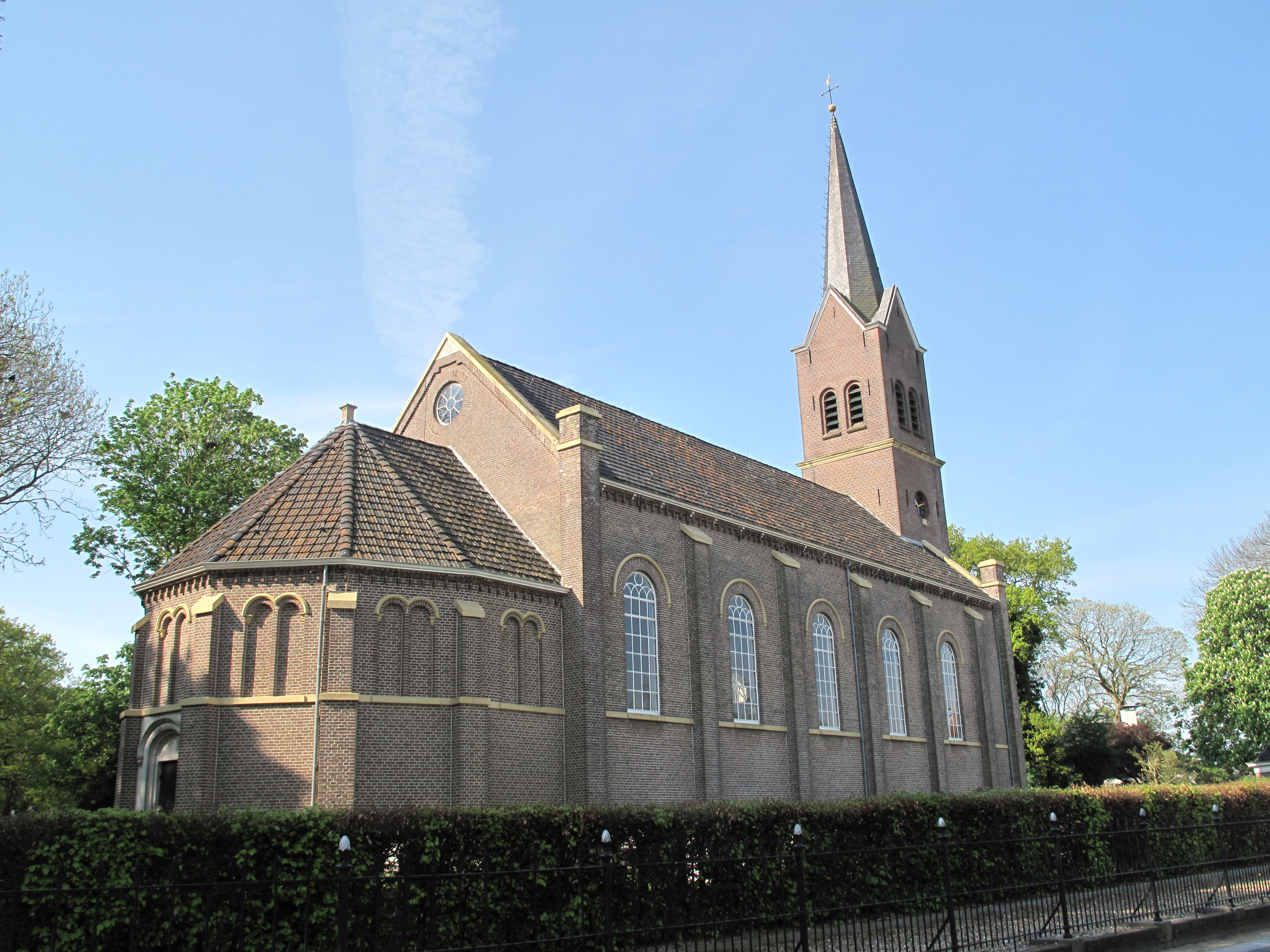
- Ysbrechtum, reformed church

- Coat of arms

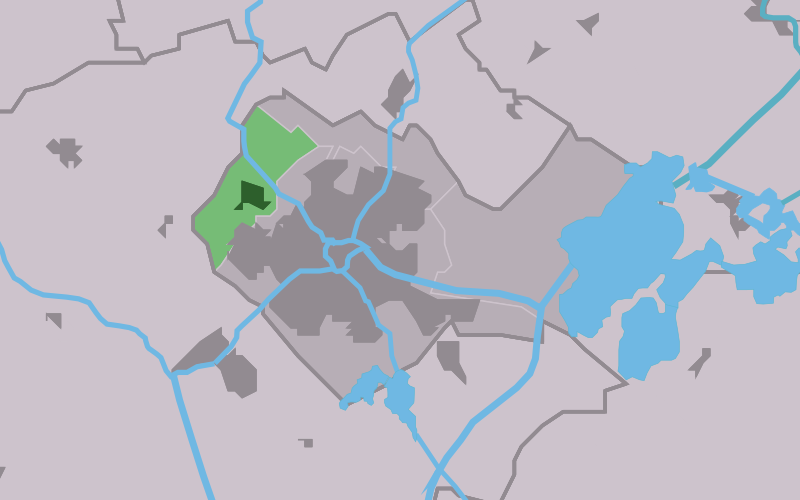
- Location in the former Sneek municipality

- Location in the Netherlands IJsbrechtum (Netherlands)
- Coordinates: 53°02′32″N 5°37′59″E
- Country: Netherlands
- Province: Friesland
- Municipality: Súdwest-Fryslân

Area
  - Total: 3.44 km^{2} (1.33 sq mi)
- Elevation: 0.4 m (1.3 ft)

Population (2021)
  - Total: 690
  - Density: 200/km^{2} (520/sq mi)
- Time zone: UTC+1 (CET)
  - Summer (DST): UTC+2 (CEST)
- Postal code: 8633
- Dialing code: 0515

Ysbrechtum (Dutch: IJsbrechtum) is a village 1 km from the city of Sneek in Friesland, Netherlands. It had a population of around 690 in January 2017.

Ysbrechtum contains the Epema State, an old estate.

== History ==
The village was first mentioned in the 13th century as "Jsbrectum," and means "the settlement of IJsbrecht." Ysbrechtum is a terp (artificial living hill) village which developed in the early middle ages.

The Dutch Reformed church was built in 1694 as a replacement for its 11th or 12th century predecessor. In 1865, the church was modified and the tower was rebuilt.

Epema State is a stins which dated from before 1449. In 1651, it was bought by Doeke Martena van Burmania, the grietman (predecessor of mayor/judge) of Wymbritseradeel who extensively modified the estate in 1652 and constructed a gate house. In 1825, the estate was extensively modified and rebuilt in Second Empire style. In 1880, a dome was placed on the roof, but was removed soon after, because it was too heavy. In 1894, the estate was modified in Renaissance Revival style. The building is privately owned and serves as a residential home. The estate is surrounded by a large park.

Ysbrechtum was home to 198 people in 1840. In 1844, the road from Sneek to Bolsward was built, and Ysbrechtum extended towards to road. After World War II, Ysbrechtum became a commuters village of Sneek.

Until 2011 it belonged to Sneek municipality and before 1984, the village was part of the Wymbritseradiel municipality. In 2015, Sneek announced plans to extend its industrial zone up to Ysbrechtum. The decision triggered protests from the village, and the plans have been altered in 2017.

== Notable inhabitants ==
- Anna-Marie Goddard is originally from Ysbrechtum.

== Gallery ==
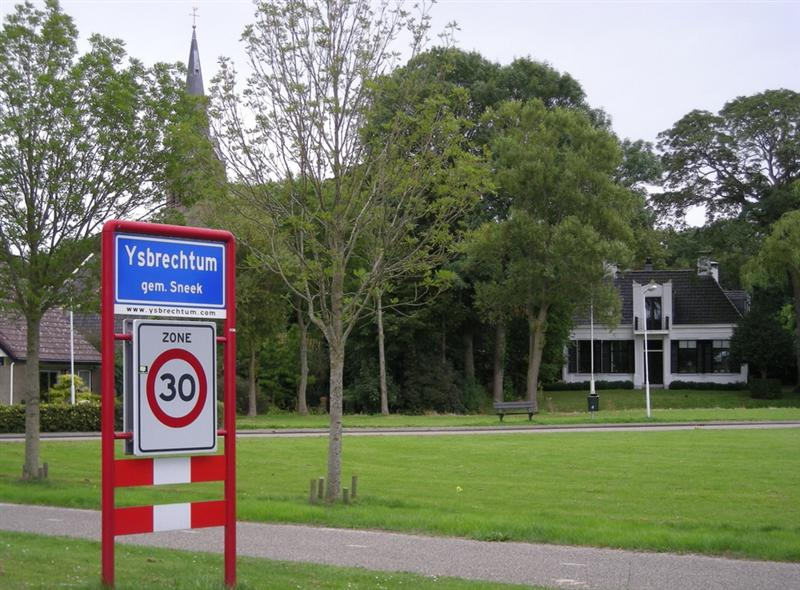
Home to Ysbrechtum

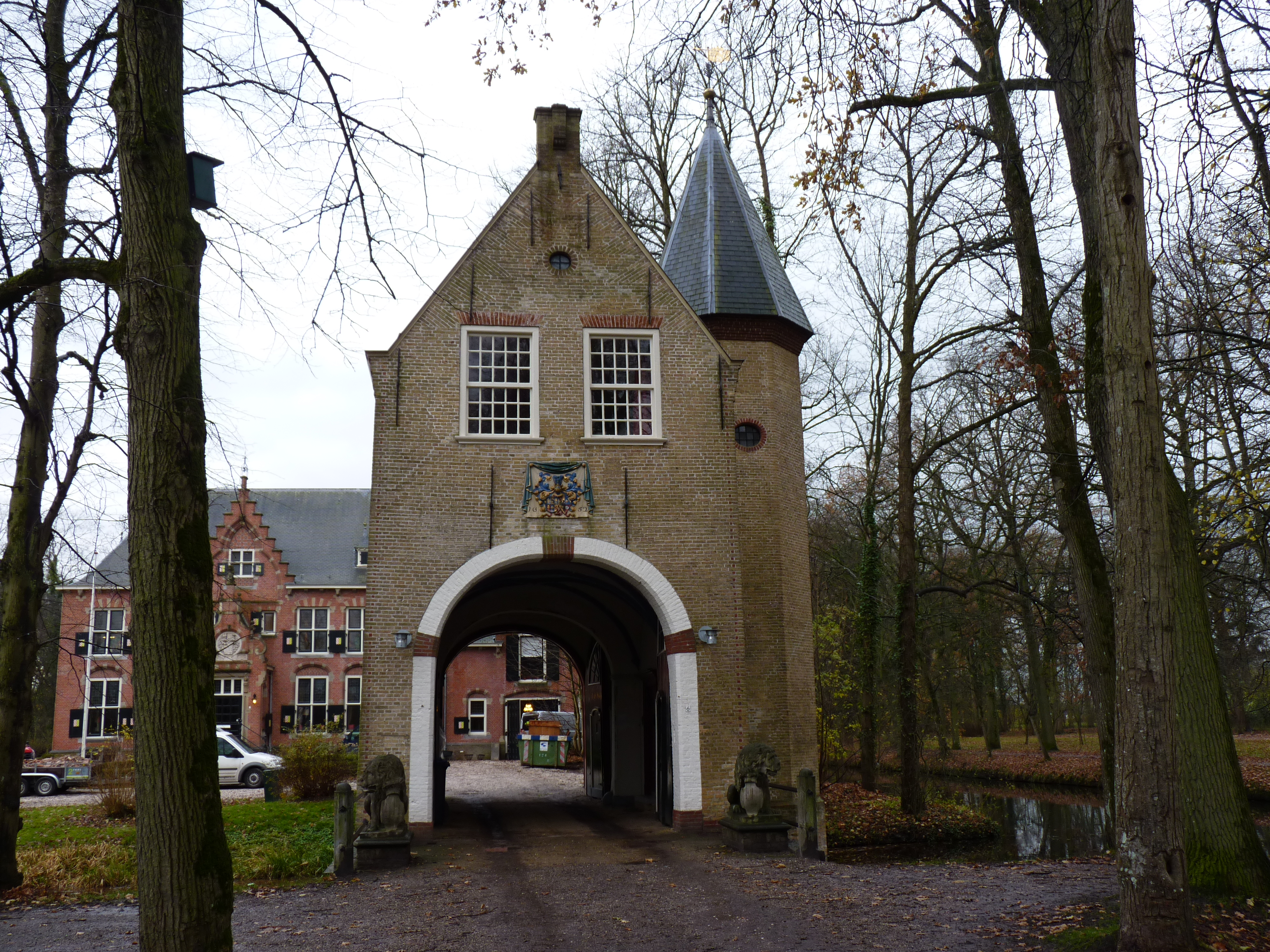
Gate house of Epema State

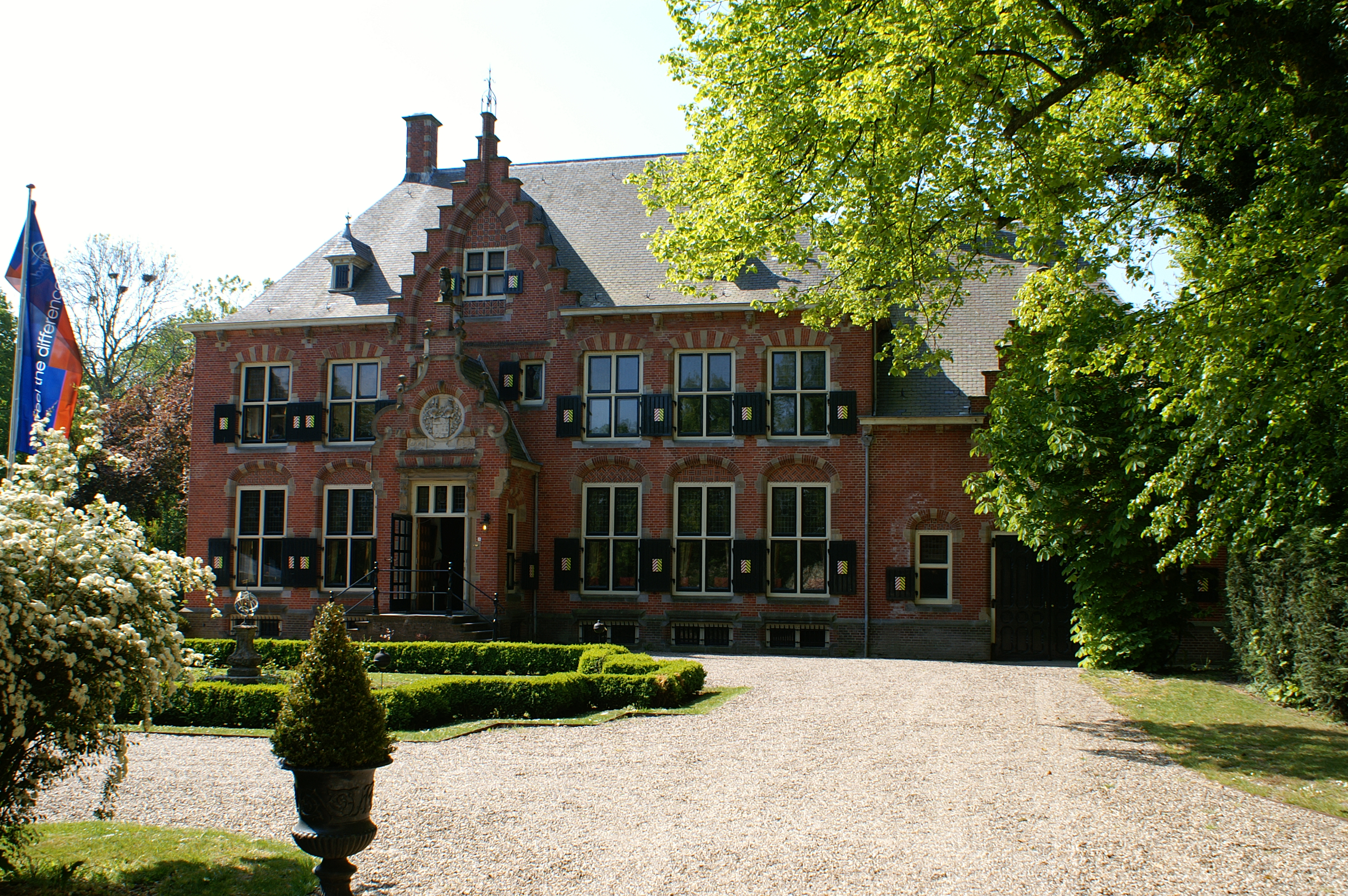
Epema State

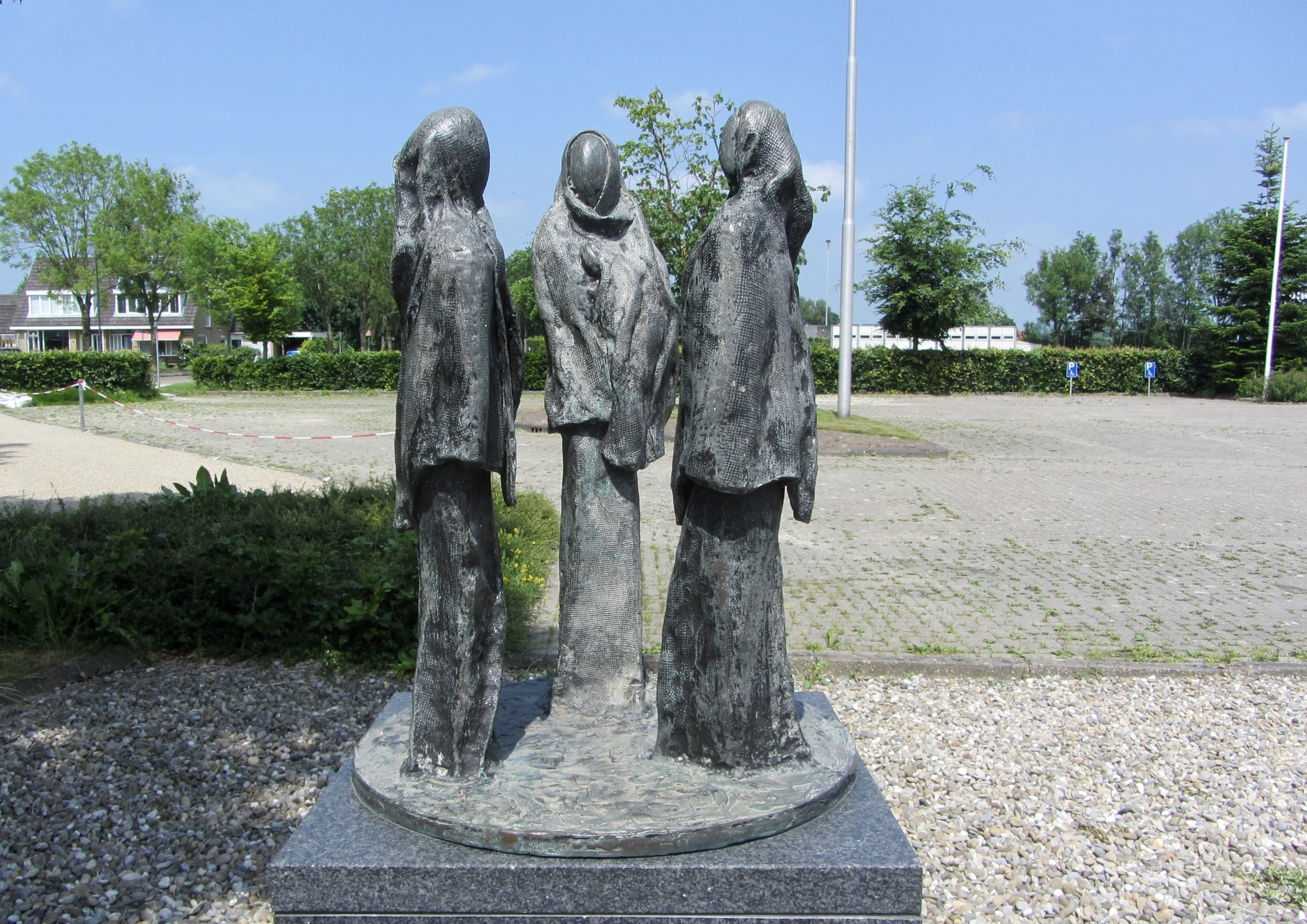
Statue in Ysbrechtum
