= Schalsum =

Schalsum Skalsum
- Village
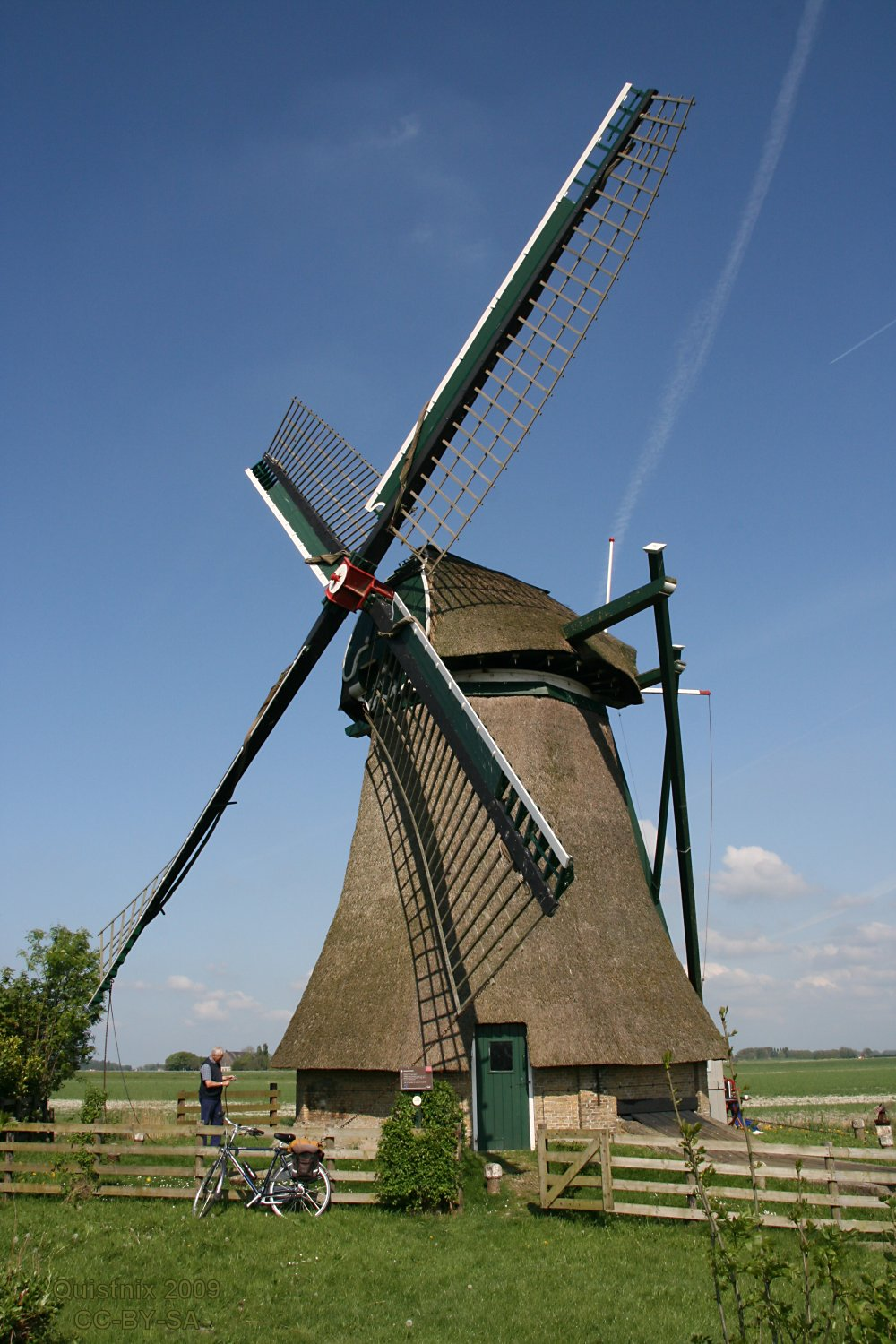
- Schalsumermolen

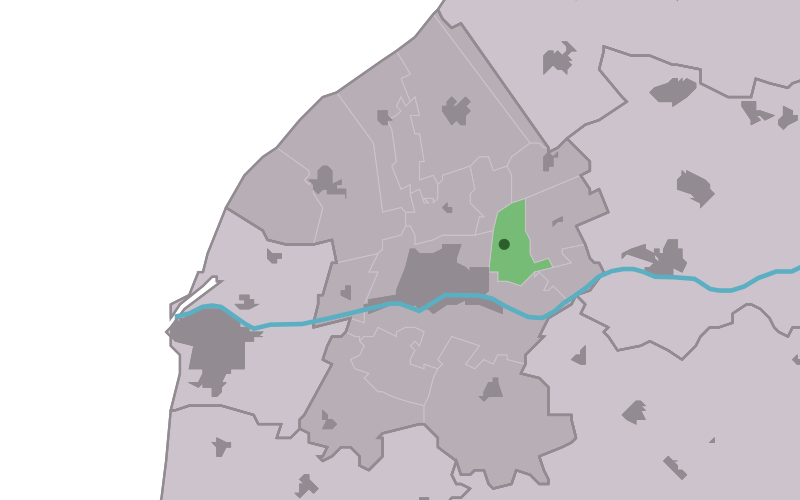
- Location in the Franekeradeel municipality

- Location in the Netherlands Schalsum (Netherlands)
- Country: Netherlands
- Province: Friesland
- Municipality: Waadhoeke

Area
  - Total: 3.42 km^{2} (1.32 sq mi)
- Elevation: 0.5 m (1.6 ft)

Population (2021)
  - Total: 150
  - Density: 44/km^{2} (110/sq mi)
- Time zone: UTC+1 (CET)
  - Summer (DST): UTC+2 (CEST)
- Postal code: 8813
- Dialing code: 0517

Schalsum (West Frisian: Skalsum) is a village in Waadhoeke in the province of Friesland, the Netherlands. It had a population of around 134 in January 2014.

== History ==
The village was first mentioned in 1319 as Scalkessum, and means "settlement of the servant". Schalsum is a terp (artificial living hill) village, however the hill is of medium height and with a gentle slope and therefore, not apparent.

The Protestant church dates from the 12th century. Churches in the northern provinces of the Netherlands used to be divided in three parts: a baptism chapel, church and a sacrament chapel, however the fast majorities of churches were redesigned to a single building. The St Nicolas Church of Schalsum is one of the few churches were the original layout is still intact. The church used to be covered in ivy (Hedera helix) however it was removed in the 18th century. The church is nowadays used for weddings.

There is a restored windmill in the village, De Schalsumermolen. It is a polder mill from 1802. It was restored between 1977 and 1979.

Schalsum was home to 121 people in 1840. Until 2018, the village was part of the Franekeradeel municipality.

== Gallery ==
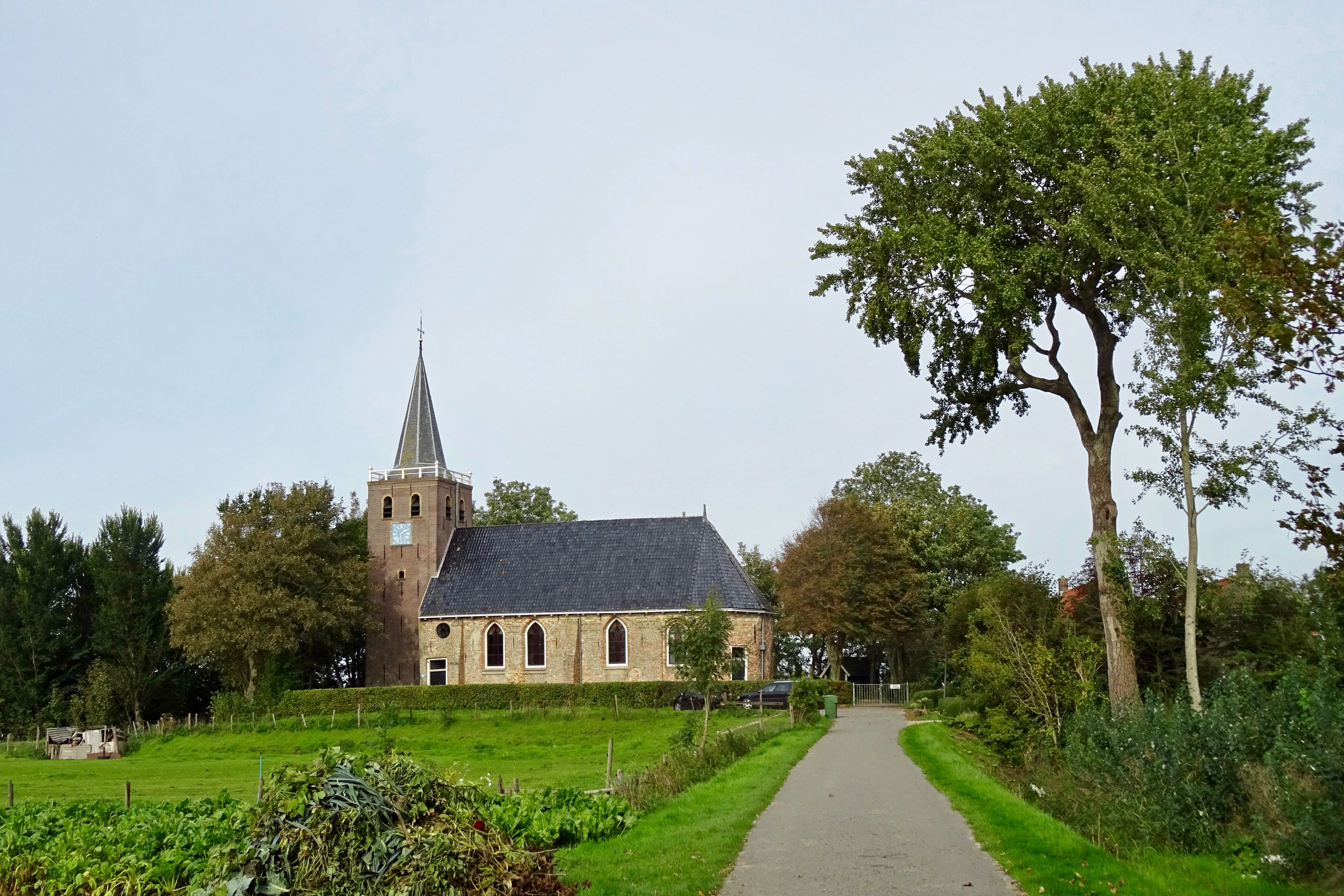
St Nicolas Church

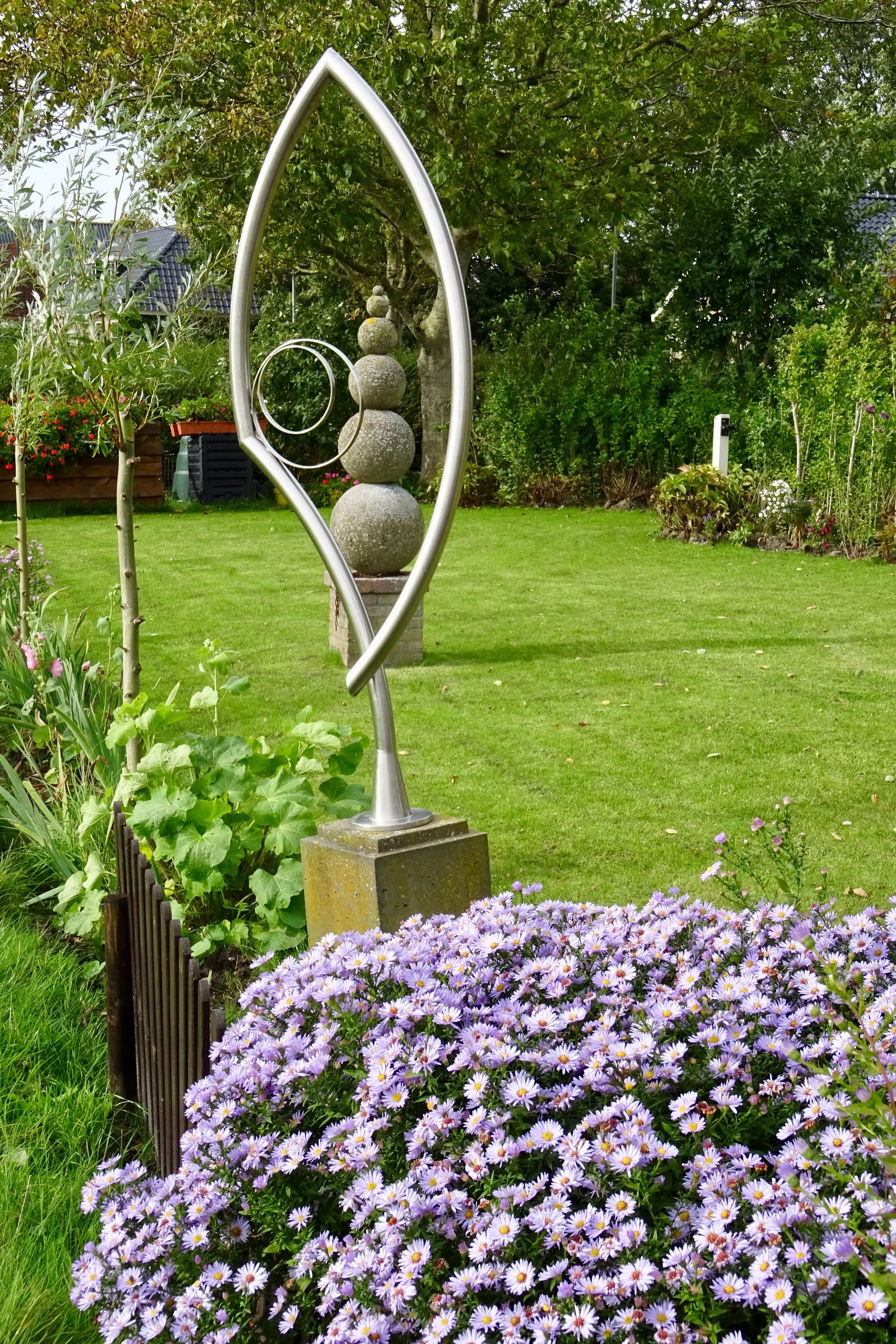
Sculptures in garden
