= Burgwerd =

Burgwerd Burchwert
- Village
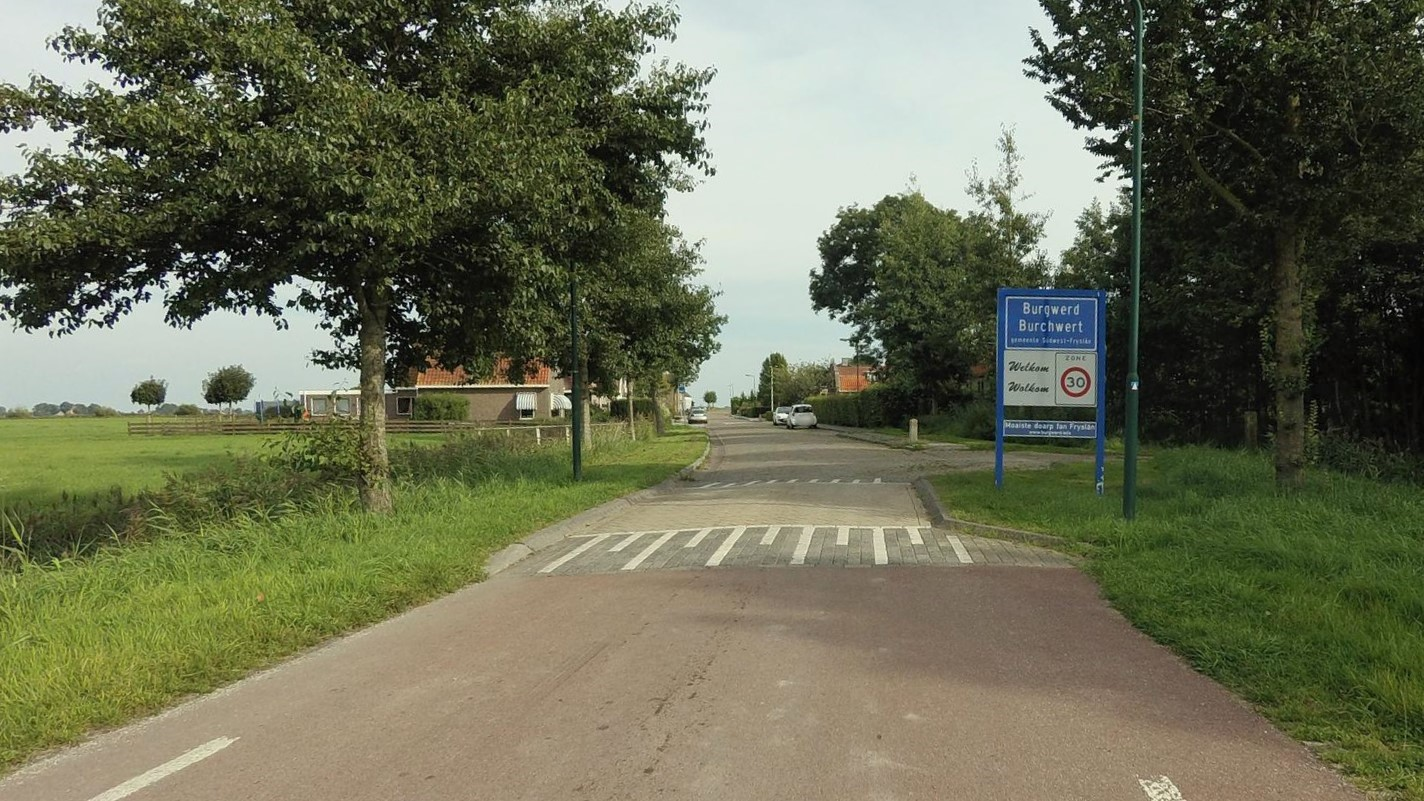
- Burgwerd

- Flag Coat of arms

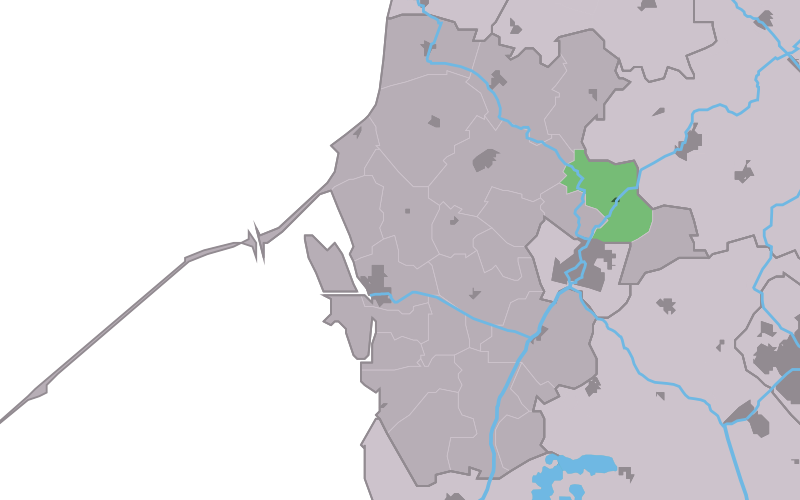
- Location in the former Wûnseradiel municipality

- Location in the Netherlands Burgwerd (Netherlands)
- Country: Netherlands
- Province: Friesland
- Municipality: Súdwest-Fryslân

Area
  - Total: 7.66 km^{2} (2.96 sq mi)
- Elevation: 0.5 m (1.6 ft)

Population (2021)
  - Total: 310
  - Density: 40/km^{2} (100/sq mi)
- Time zone: UTC+1 (CET)
  - Summer (DST): UTC+2 (CEST)
- Postal code: 8742
- Dialing code: 0515

Burgwerd (Dutch: [/ˈbʏrx.ʋərt/]; West Frisian: Burchwert) is a small village in Súdwest-Fryslân in the province of Friesland, the Netherlands. It had a population of around 315 in January 2017. It is located near the Boalserter Trekfeart.

== History ==
Burgwerd was originally a village on a terp or mound on the Dieperderhimpolder dike. In the 13th century it was known as Borghwarth. The village has four Rijksmonuments; Johanneskerk, the church which dates to the 13th century; two windmills, the Aylvapoldermolen and De Heimerter Mole; and the ornate iron fence surrounding the Dutch Reformed church.

On 21 July 2006 there was a reunion of inhabitants and former residents of Burgwerd. Before 2011, the village was part of the Wûnseradiel municipality.

== Population history ==
- 1954 – 438
- 1959 – 398
- 1964 – 377
- 1969 – 339
- 1973 – 361
- 2004 – 348

== Gallery ==
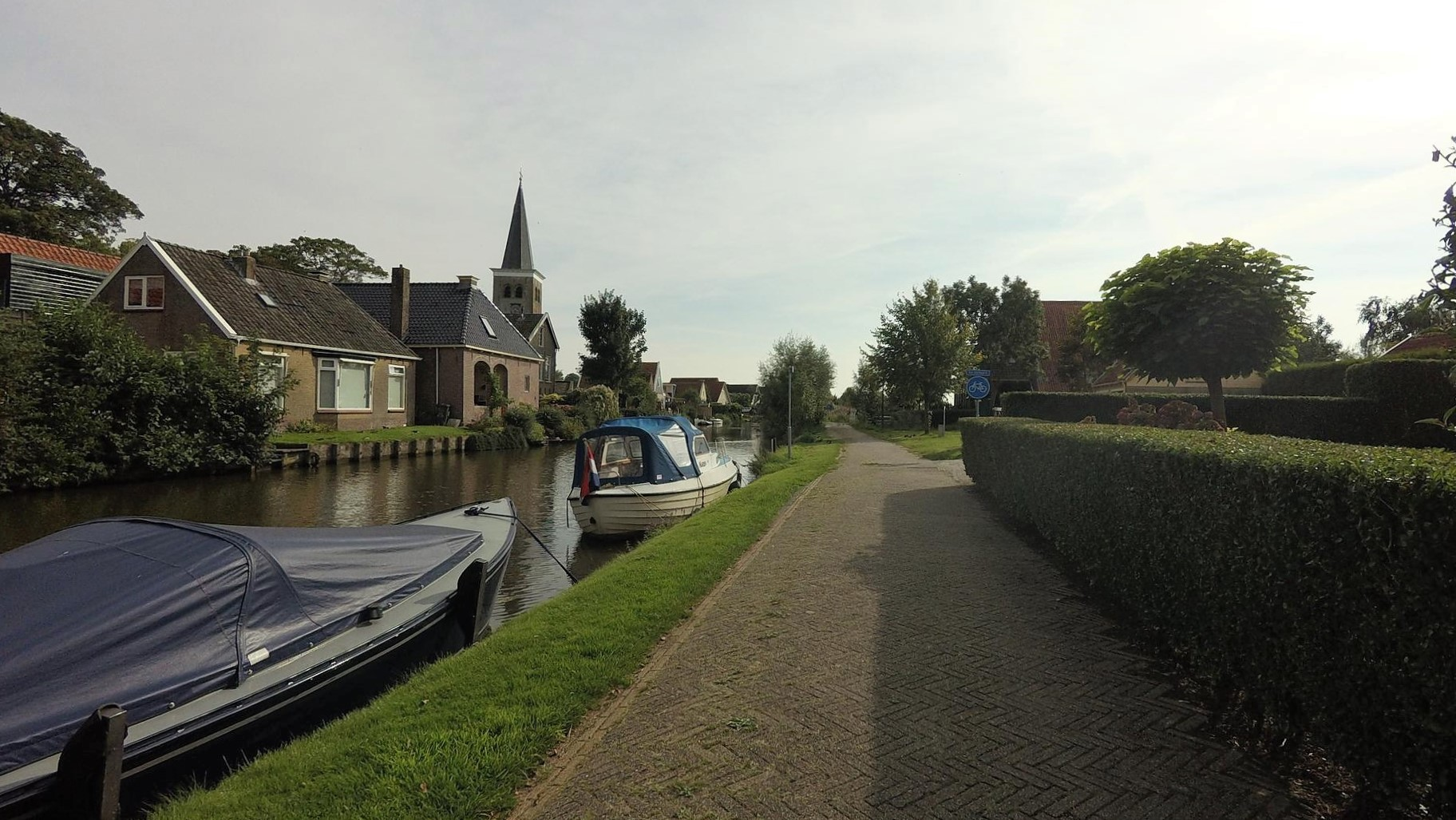
Canal view

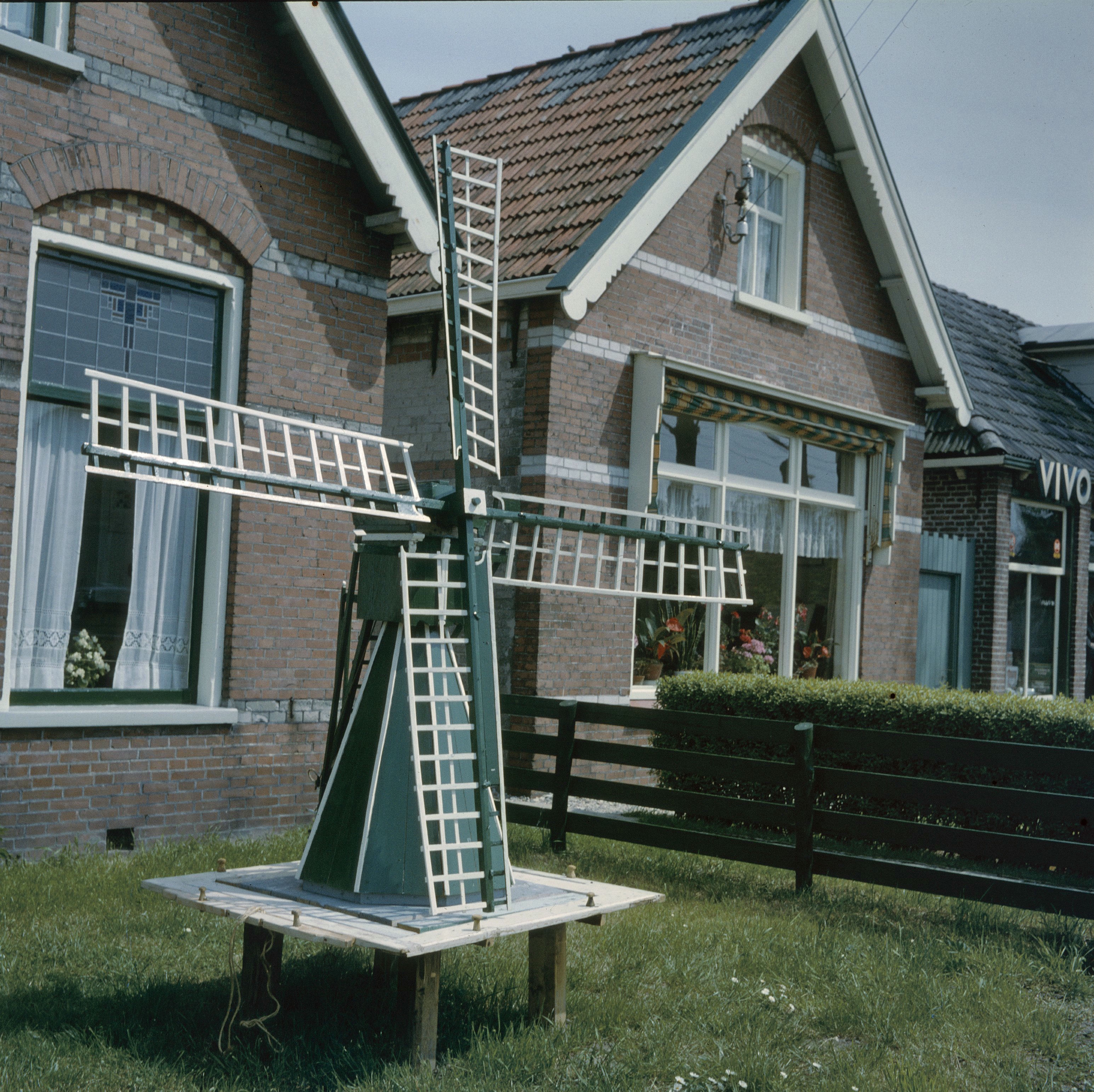
House with miniature wind mill

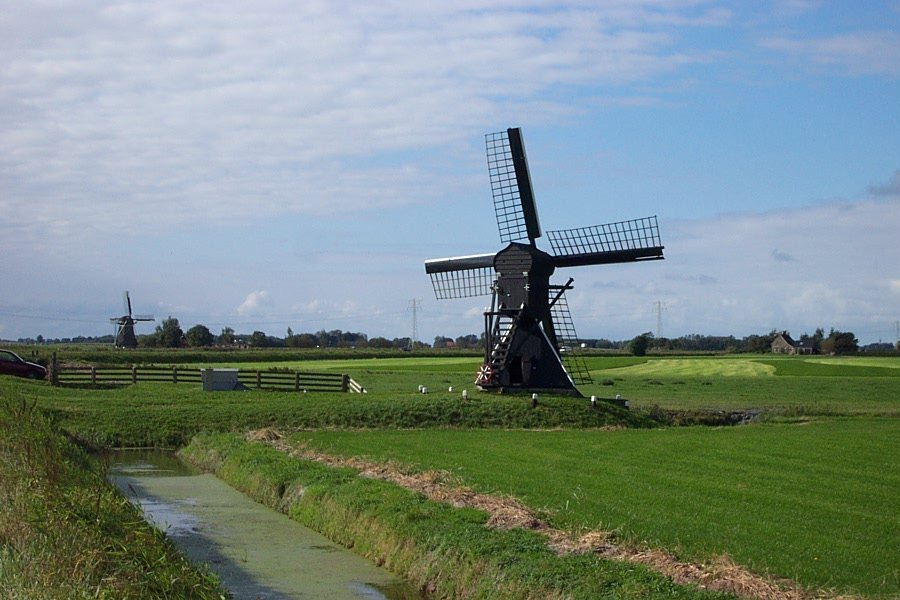
De Hiemerter Mol
