= Heeg =

Heeg Heech (West Frisian)
- Village
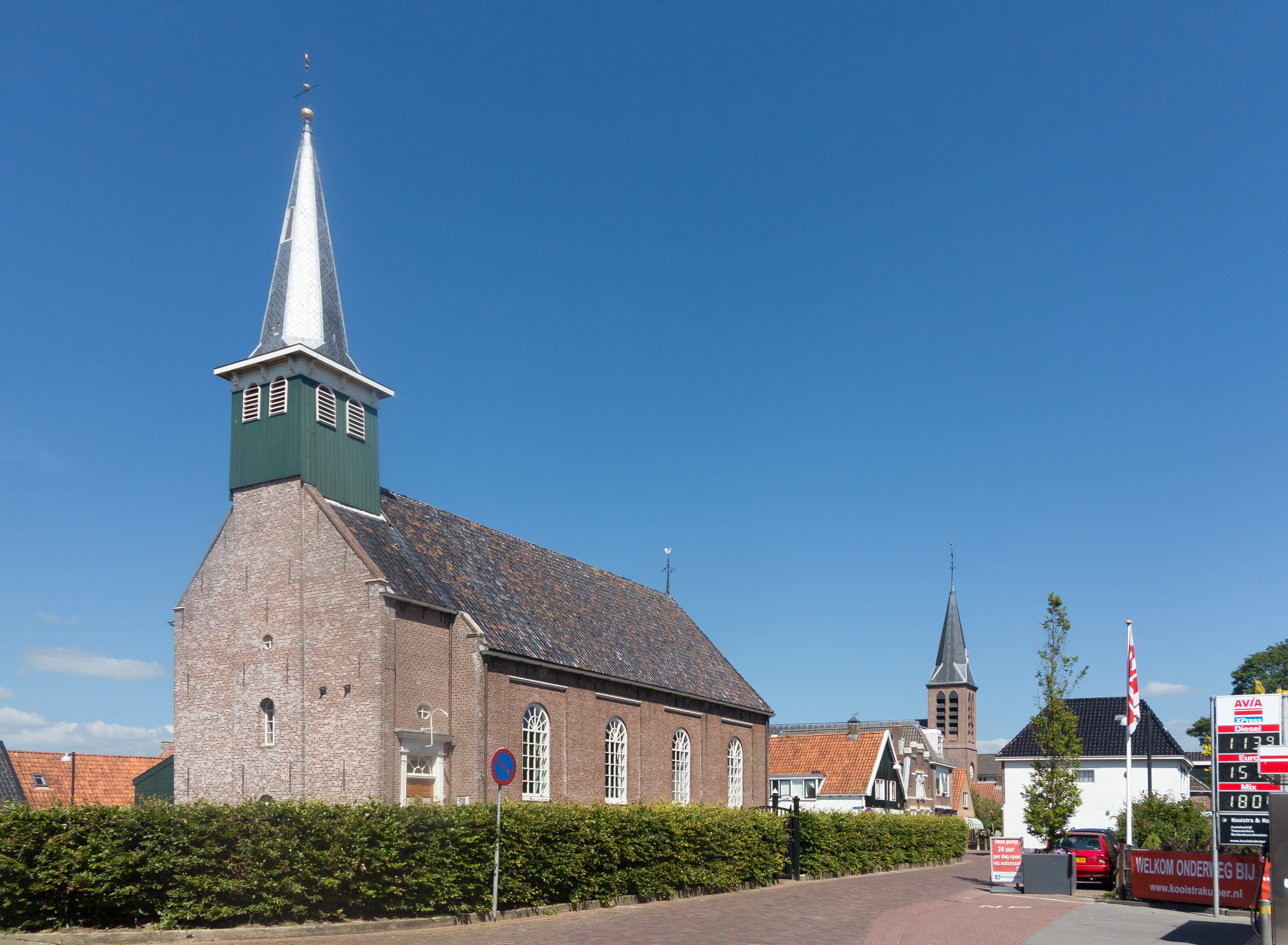
- Hagha Church

- Coat of arms

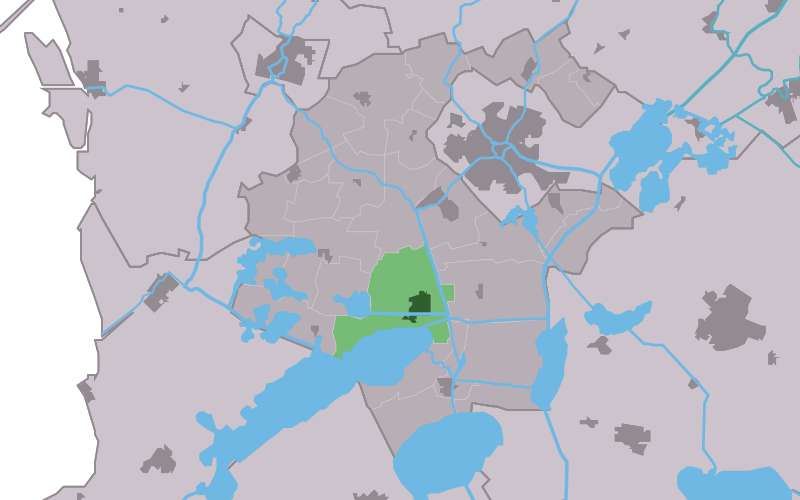
- Location in the former Wymbritseradiel municipality

- Location in the Netherlands Heeg (Netherlands)
- Country: Netherlands
- Province: Friesland
- Municipality: Súdwest-Fryslân

Population (2017)
  - Total: 2,175
- Time zone: UTC+1 (CET)
  - Summer (DST): UTC+2 (CEST)
- Postal code: 8621
- Dialing code: 0515

Heeg (Dutch: [ɦeːx]; West Frisian: Heech [heːχ]) is a village in Súdwest Fryslân municipality in the province Friesland of the Netherlands and had a population of around 2,175 in January 2017.

== History ==
Because of its location on the Heegermeer Lake, eel fishery and trade have been important to Heeg for a long time. Until 1938, eels from Heeg were exported to London. The Hegemers could thereby make use of the Dutch Mooring (Dutch landing) at the Thames, not far from the Tower of London. The trade was so important to the village that the children from Heeg at primary school all used to learn English.

In 2009 a reconstruction of the ship that used to sail eel to Londen was made, called Korneliske Ykes II.

The oldest known name of the village is Hagekerke, that appears from a fake document dating from 1132. In other documents the name is spelled like Haghekercke or Hagakerke.

Nobody is entirely sure about why the village was called that way. Some say the church (kerk) was surrounded by a hedge (haga). Others say it comes from an old Frisian word hag, which means the height the church was located. Later on in 1389 kerk disappeared from the name and in 1505 it became Heech, 74 years later it was just Heeg.

Nowadays, Heeg is a known water sports center with a variety of marinas and shipyards, with Piersma shipyard for flat bottoms the best known. This shipyard was established more than 300 years ago. In the center of the village are a few buildings from the 18th century including the Dutch Reformed Church from 1745.

Before 2011, the village was part of the Wymbritseradiel municipality.

== Gallery ==
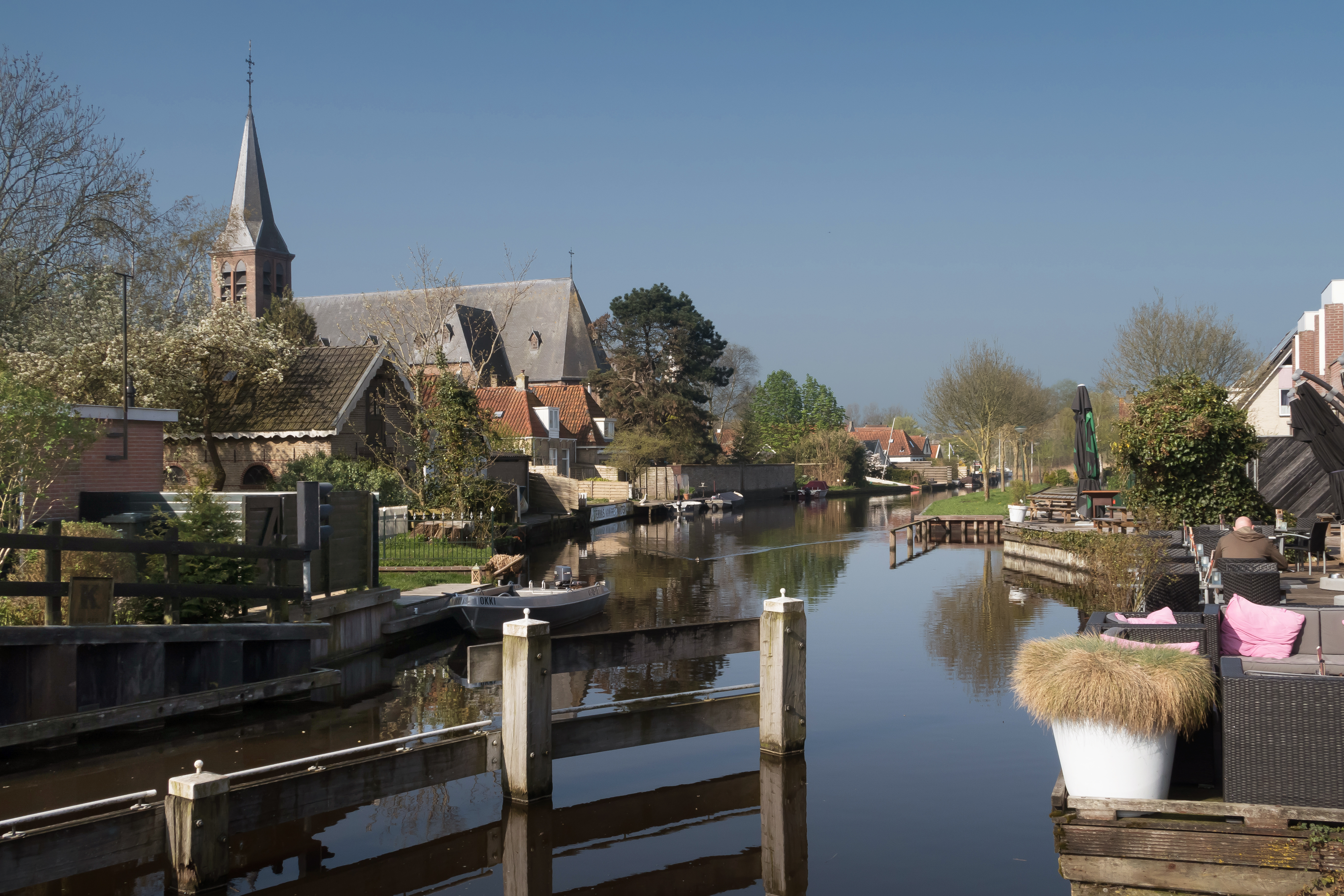
Church tower (Sint Jozefkerk) in the street

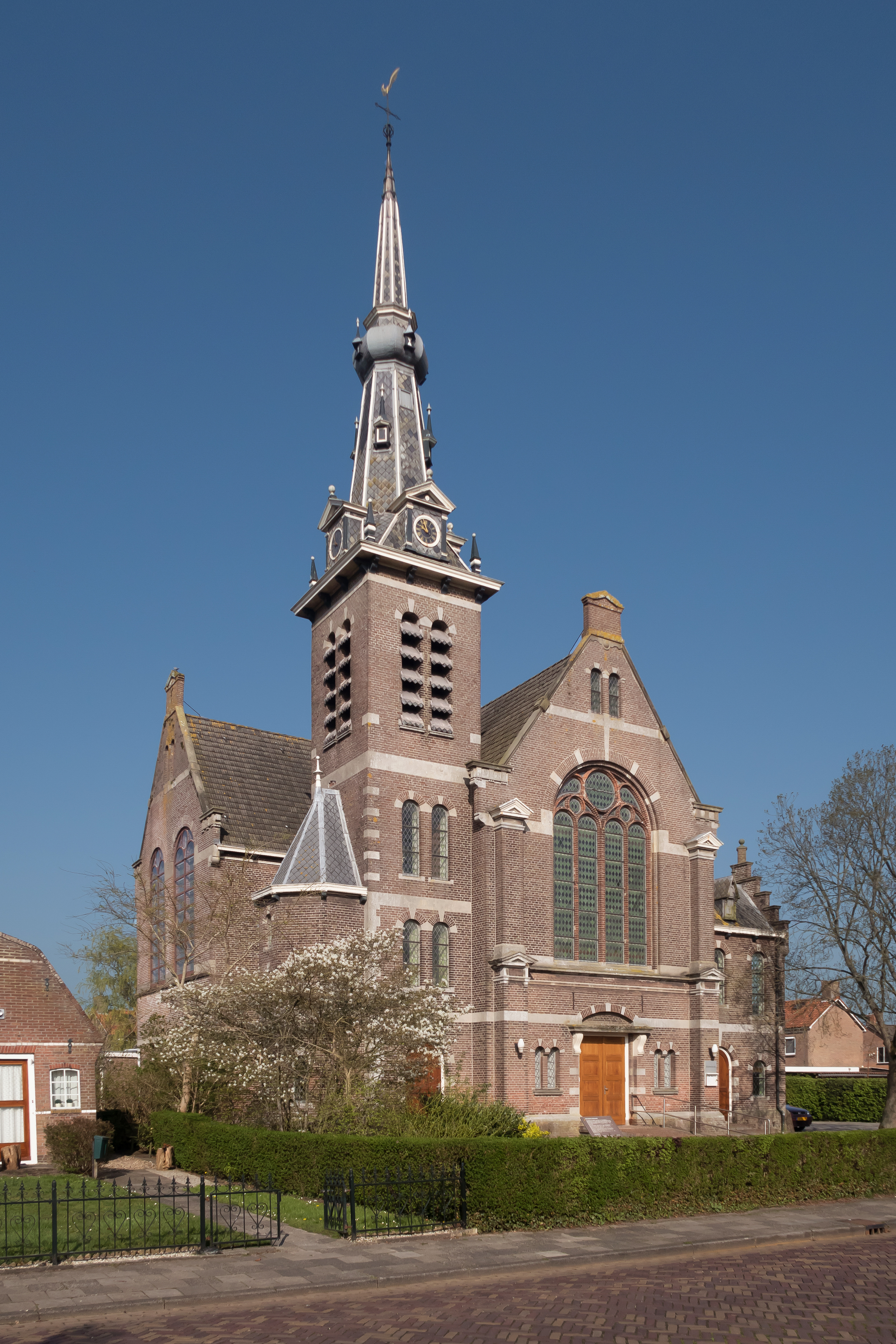
Church: de Ichtuskerk

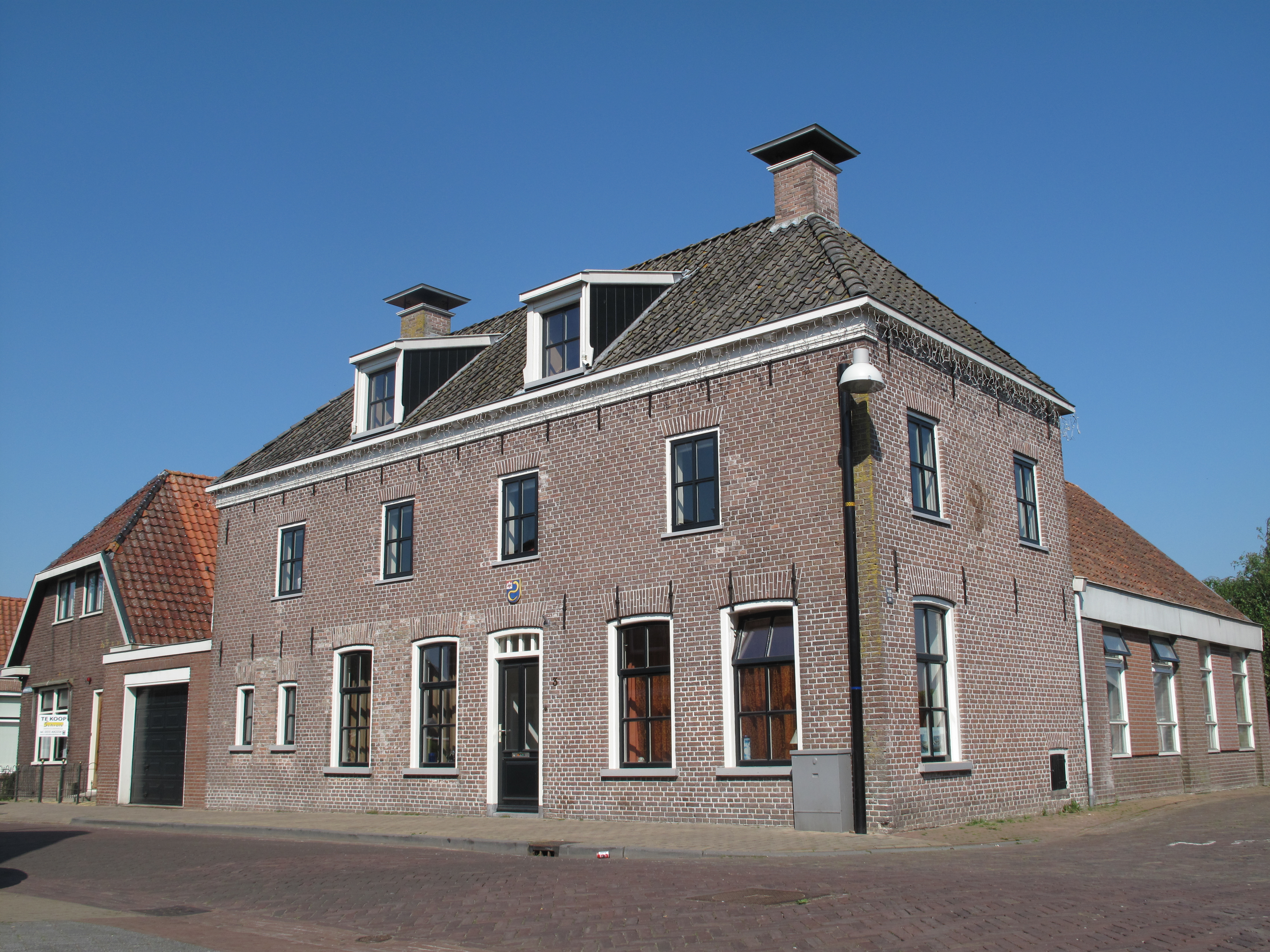
Monumental house

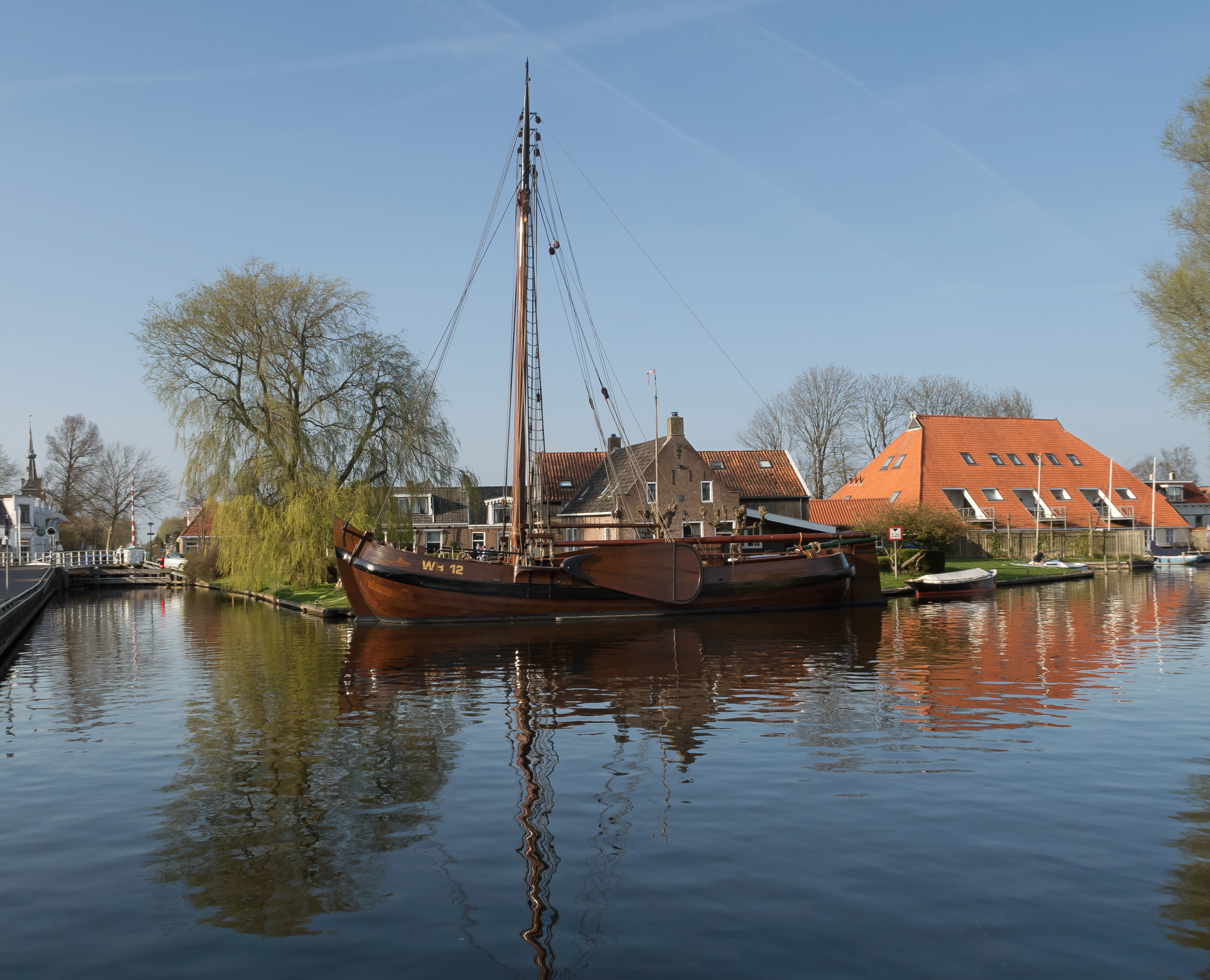
Reproduction of live cargo eel barge Corneliske Ykes II at Jachtwerf Piersma. From the 17th century, barges of this type carried live cargoes of eels from Heeg to market in London, England.

== Community ==
=== Sports and culture ===
The village has the sailing club WSHeeg, as well as other clubs related to water sports. It also has the VV Heeg football club, the Heecherop volleyball club, the Net Yn 't Net tennis club, the SSS Heeg gymnastics club and its own ice club.

=== Schools ===
Heeg has two primary schools located in the same building: CBS It Wrâldfinster and the catholic St. Jozefschool.

=== Born in Heeg ===
- Lolle Klaas Okma (1876-1936), mayor
- Gerard Bruins (1924-2016), football player
- Ben Steneker (1935-), Dutch countrysinger a.k.a. The godfather of Dutch country
- Hanneke Jagersma (1951-), mayor
- Jurn Simmons (1991-), professional wrestler
