= Wommels =

- Village
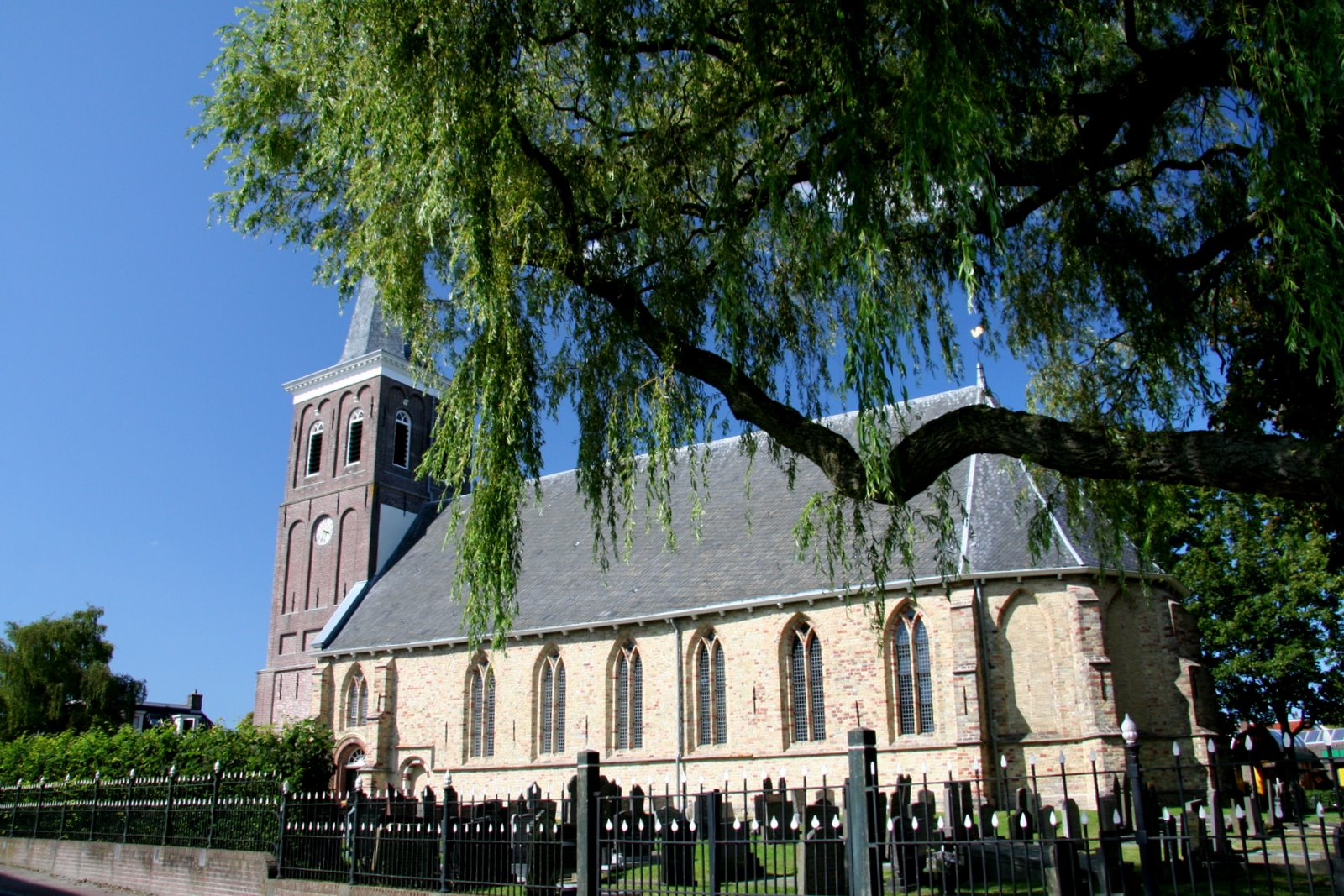
- St Jacobi church

- Flag Coat of arms

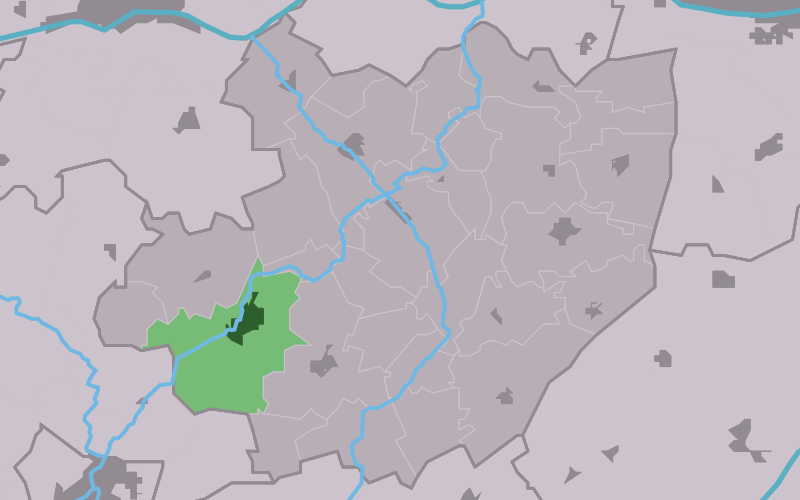
- Location in the former Littenseradiel municipality

- Location in the Netherlands Wommels (Netherlands)
- Country: Netherlands
- Province: Friesland
- Municipality: Súdwest-Fryslân

Area
  - Total: 10.28 km^{2} (3.97 sq mi)
- Elevation: 0.3 m (0.98 ft)

Population (2021)
  - Total: 2,370
  - Density: 231/km^{2} (597/sq mi)
- Time zone: UTC+1 (CET)
  - Summer (DST): UTC+2 (CEST)
- Postal code: 8731
- Dialing code: 0515
- Website: Official

Wommels is a village in Súdwest-Fryslân municipality in the province of Friesland, the Netherlands. It had a population of around 2,216 in January 2017.

== History ==
The village was first mentioned in the second half of the 13th century as Wimelinghe, and means "settlement of the people of Winiwald or Wimila (person)." Wommels is a terp village from the middle ages. Later the village extended along the canal.

The church which probably dated from the 13th century burned down in the late-15th century. It was rebuilt in 1508. The current tower dates from 1862. The stins Sminia State used to be located in Wommels and was built after 1706. In 1898, it was owned by mayor Hopperus Buma who transformed the estate into a villa in Renaissance Revival. After a dispute with the councilors, he resigned and moved his villa brick by brick to Haarlem. Part of the forest which belong to the estate has remained.

Wommels was home to 649 people in 1840. In 1892, a dairy factory opened in Wommels, and the village became known for its cheese.

In 1984, it became the capital of the municipality of newly formed Littenseradiel, however the municipality was merged into Súdwest-Fryslân in 2018.

== Gallery ==
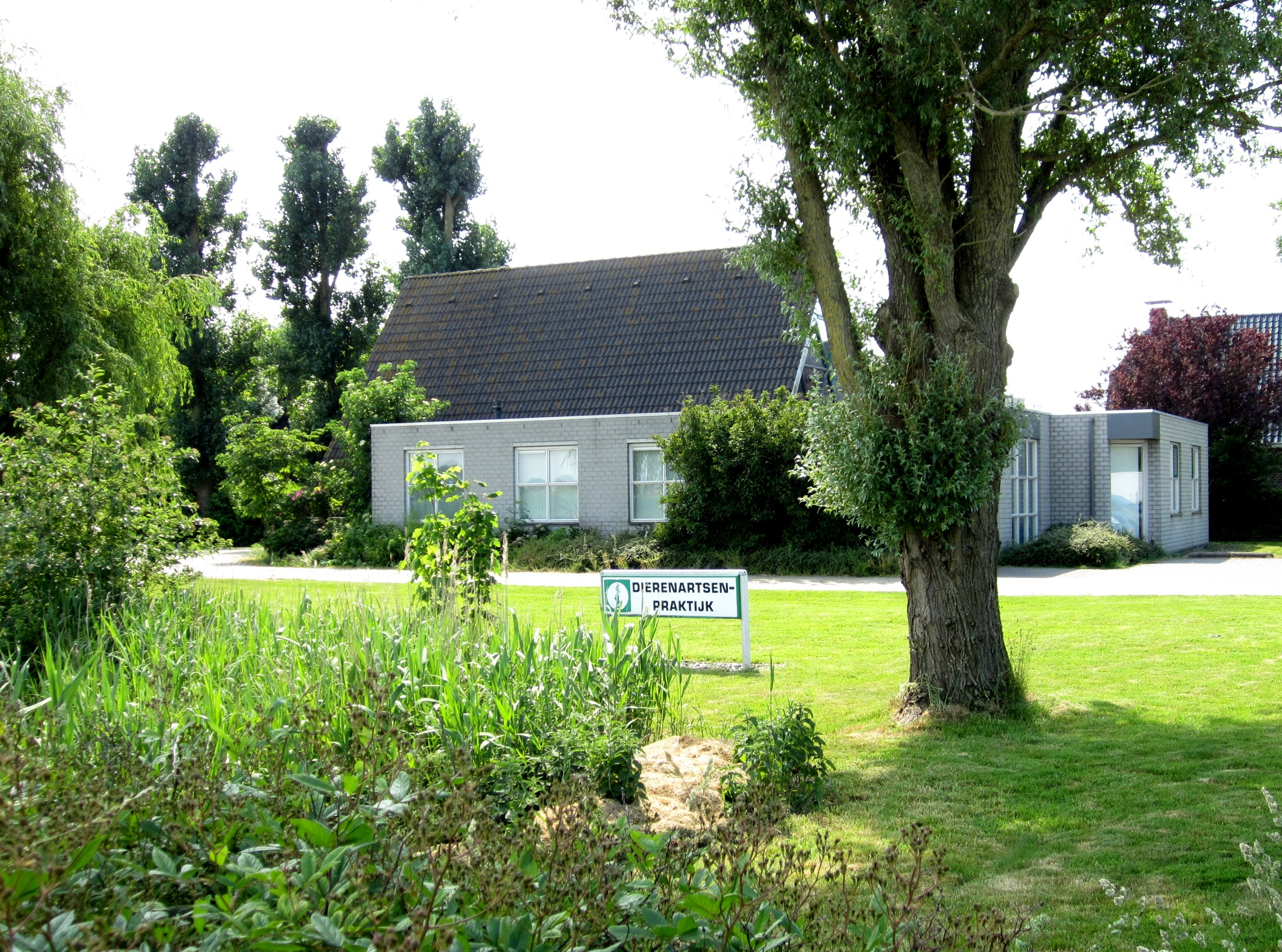
Veterinarian of Wommels

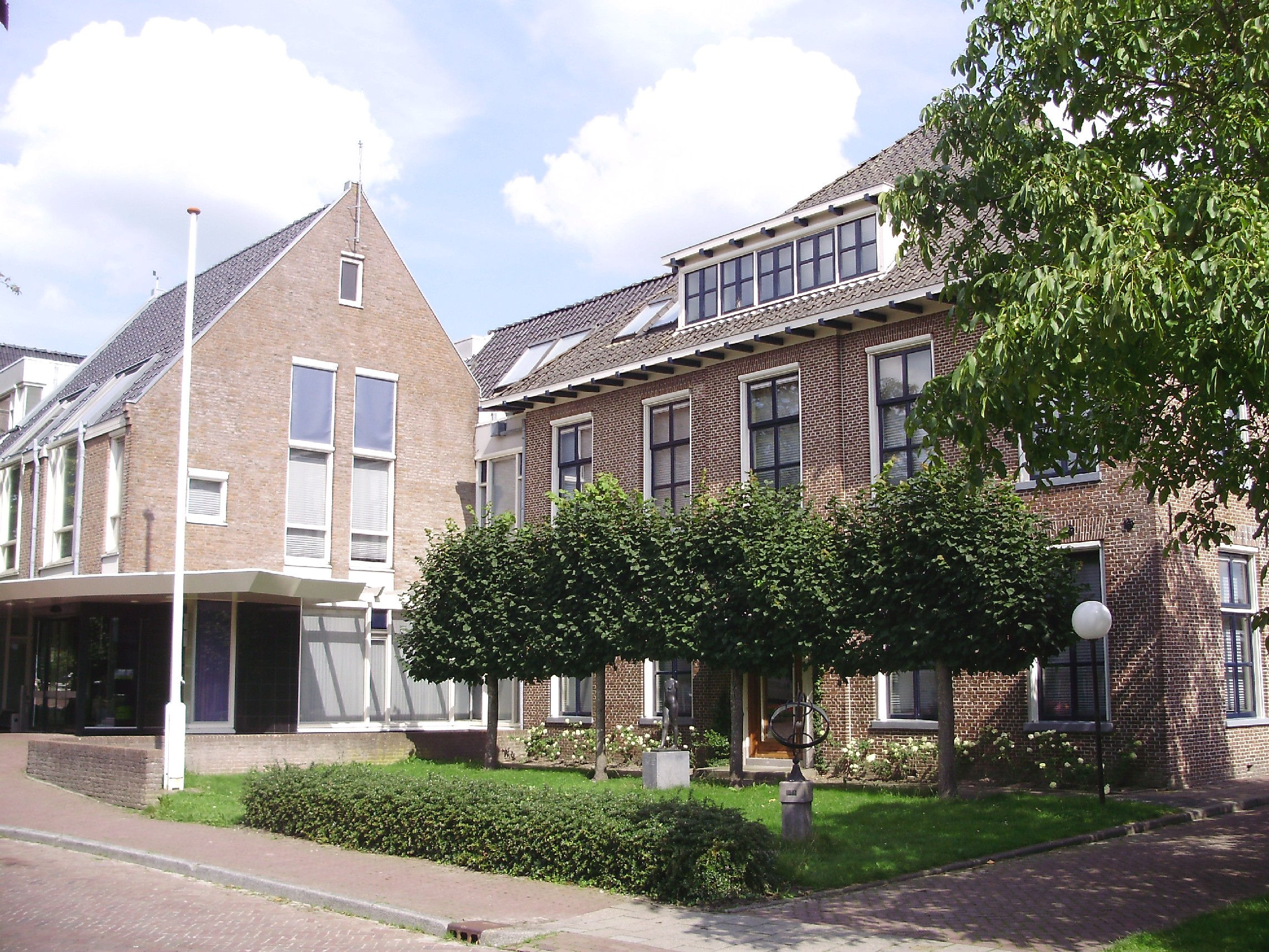
Former town hall

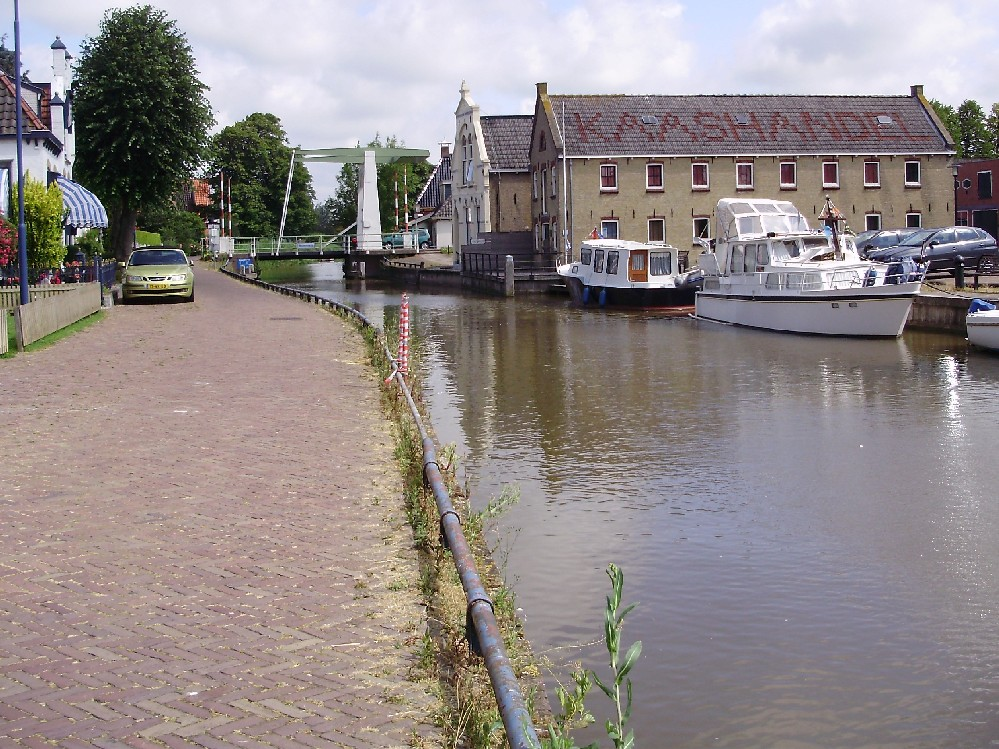
View along the canal

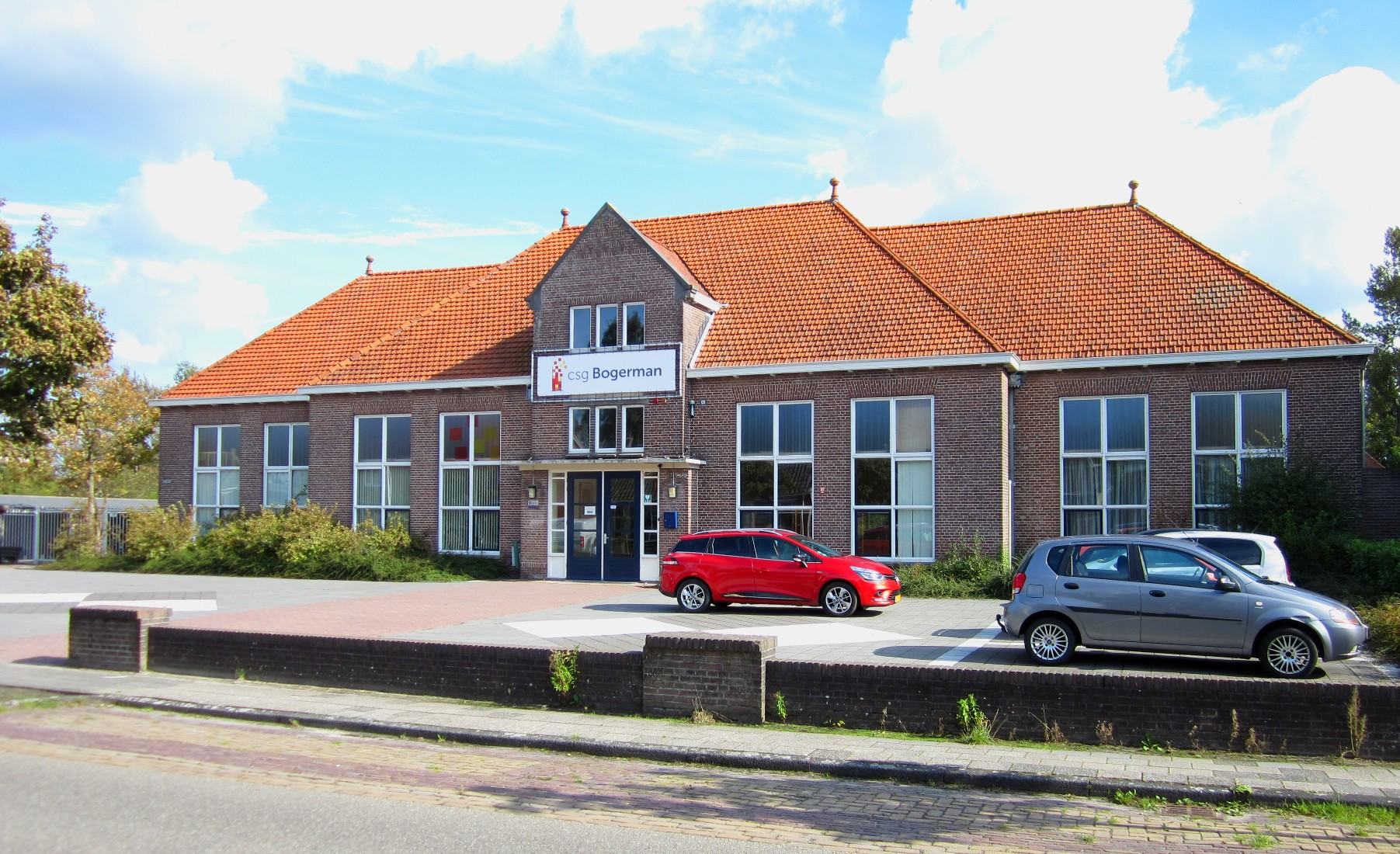
Former secondary school
