= Tietje Spannenburg-Pagels =

Dutch speed skater

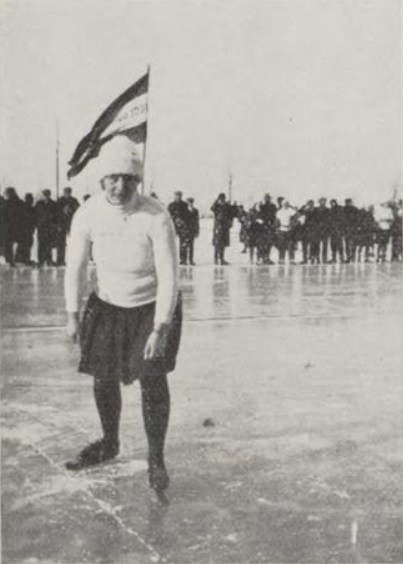

Personal information
- Born: 2 June 1906 Hallum, Netherlands

Sport
- Country: Netherlands
- Sport: Speed skating

Tietje Spannenburg-Pagels (born 2 June 1906) was a Dutch kortebaan speed skater. Spannenburg-Pagels was born in Hallum. She later lived in Wommels.

Between 1917 and 1933 she won a total of 56 prizes. Next to money prizes and two medals she also won a spoon, watch and a painting.

The first prize she won was when she was eleven years old, and she finished second in a boys-and-girls competition in IJlst on 12 Februari 1917. Her partner in this competition was E. de Groot, also from Wommels. She won her last prize in Marrum on 30 January 1933, the last race of the winter of 1932-33 because the ice thawed. Most of the races she rode together with Jouke de Groot from Jorwerd. When he was ill, she competed several competitions in December with O. Bijlsma from Eernewoude.

D. Volbeda wrote a poem in Frisian about Pagels and Jouke de Groot.

Her brother Romke was also a kortebaan speed skater. He won a 14–15 years competition in Heerenveen in 1926. He skated 100 metres in 11.6 seconds and won a golden watch.

== Achievements ==
1921–22
3rd prize (watch) - 31 January 1922 in Bolsward (“Friesche Jeugd”)
1st prize (f 8) - 11 February 1922 in Britswerd (boys and girls)
1st prize (f 8) - 13 February 1922 in IJsbrechtum (boys and girls)
1922–23
1st prize (f 25) - 20 February 1923 in Hardegarijp (women)
1923–24
3rd prize (f 20) - 30 December 1923 in Sybrandaburen (women)
1st prize (f 30) - 31 December 1923 in Bergumerheide (women)
4th prize (f 10) - 5 January 1924 in Rijperkerk (women)
2nd prize (f 40) - 9 January 1924 in Stiens (women)
3rd prize (f 30) - 7 January 1924 in Oudkerk (women)
3rd prize (f 30) - 8 January 1924 in Leeuwarden (women)
2nd prize (f 30) - 17 January 1924 in Warga (women)
4th prize (f 15) - 18 January 1924 in Appingedam (women)
4th prize (f 5) - 24 January 1924 in Deersum (women)
1st prize (f 20) - 7 February 1924 in Warga (under-23 and daughters)
1925–26
2nd prize (f 20) - 8 December 1925 in Workum (women)
prize (f 40) - 17 January 1926 in Stiens (men and women)
prize (f 20) - 17 January 1926 in Stiens (women, of the pairs)
1st prize (f 100) - 18 January 1926 in Heerenveen (men and women)
1st prize (f 60) - 20 January 1926 in Lemmer (men and women)
2nd prize (f 30) - 21 January 1926 in Huizum (women)

1927–28
1st prize (f 100 and medal of the Queen) - 22 December 1927 in Grouw (men and women)
1st prize (f 80) - 31 December 1927 in Dokkum (men and women)
1st prize (f 60) - 1 January 1928 in Warga (men and women)
1st prize (f 100) - 2 January 1928 in Heerenveen (men and women)
3rd prize (f 15) - 3 January 1928 in Drachten (men and women)

1928–29
2nd prize (f 10) - 8 January 1929 in Jorwerd (women)
1st prize (f 30) - 12 January 1929 in Oosterlittens (men and women)
1st prize (f 100) - 13 January 1929 in Zwolle (men and women)
fastest race (f 2.50) - 23 January 1929 (women)
29 January 1929 in Balk

1st prize (f 50) - men and women
prize (f 30) - women, of the pairs
Medal fastest race

1st prize (f 50) - 2 February 1929 in Workum (men and women)
1st prize (f 60) - 3 February 1929 in Grouw (men and women)
2nd prize (f 25) - 4 February 1929 in Grouw (women)
1st prize (f 50) - 5 February 1929 in Veenwouden (men and women)
1st prize (f 40) - 6 February 1929 in Heeg (men and women)
2nd prize (f 60) - 7 February 1929 in Heerenveen (men and women)
1st prize (f 60) - 8 February 1929 in Sneek (men and women)
3rd prize (f 40) - 9 February 1929 in Groningen (men and women)
1st prize (f 60) - 10 February 1929 in Stiens (men and women)
1st prize (f 120) - 13 February 1929 in Leeuwarden (men and women)
1st prize (f 15) - 14 February 1929 in Rien (women)
1st prize (f 100) - 15 February 1929 in Oldehove (men and women; 28 pairs)
1st prize (f 120) - 19 February 1929 in Sloten (men and women)
1st prize (f 80) - 21 February 1929 in Oudega (Note: There are three places in Friesland called Oudega, and it is unclear which this one was. There is evidence that open-air skating competitions have been held at Oudega, Smallingerland. Oudega, Súdwest-Fryslân lies on a polder, and is almost the same distance from Wommels as IJlst, where she is known to have competed. Oudega, De Fryske Marren (also known as Oudega (H.O.N.)) is further away from Wommels, but at about the same distance as Sloten, where she is known to have competed.) (H.O.H) (men and women)
2nd prize (f 40) - 23 February 1929 in Sint Jacobiparochie (men and women)
3rd prize (f 30) - 28 February 1929 in Witmarsum (men and women)

1932–33
1st prize (f ) - 11 December 1932 in Leeuwarden (men and women; with O. Bijlsma)
1st prize (f 20) - 13 December 1932 in Jorwerd (women)
2nd prize (f ) - 15 December 1932 in Dokkum (men and women; with O. Bijlsma)
1st prize (f ) - 16 December 1932 in Stiens (men and women; with O. Bijlsma)
1st prize (f 36) - 18 January 1933 in Wartena (men and women)
1st prize (f 50) - 19 January 1933 in Lemmer (men and women)
1st prize (f 60) - 22 January 1933 in Warga (men and women)
1st prize (f 50) - 23 January 1933 in Makkum (men and women)
2nd prize (f 20) - 27 January 1933 in Witmarsum (men and women)
2nd prize (f 20) - 29 January 1933 in Weidum (men and women)
prize (f 7.50) - 30 January 1933 in Stiens (men and women)
