= Iepenloftspul Jorwert =

Cultural event in the Netherlands

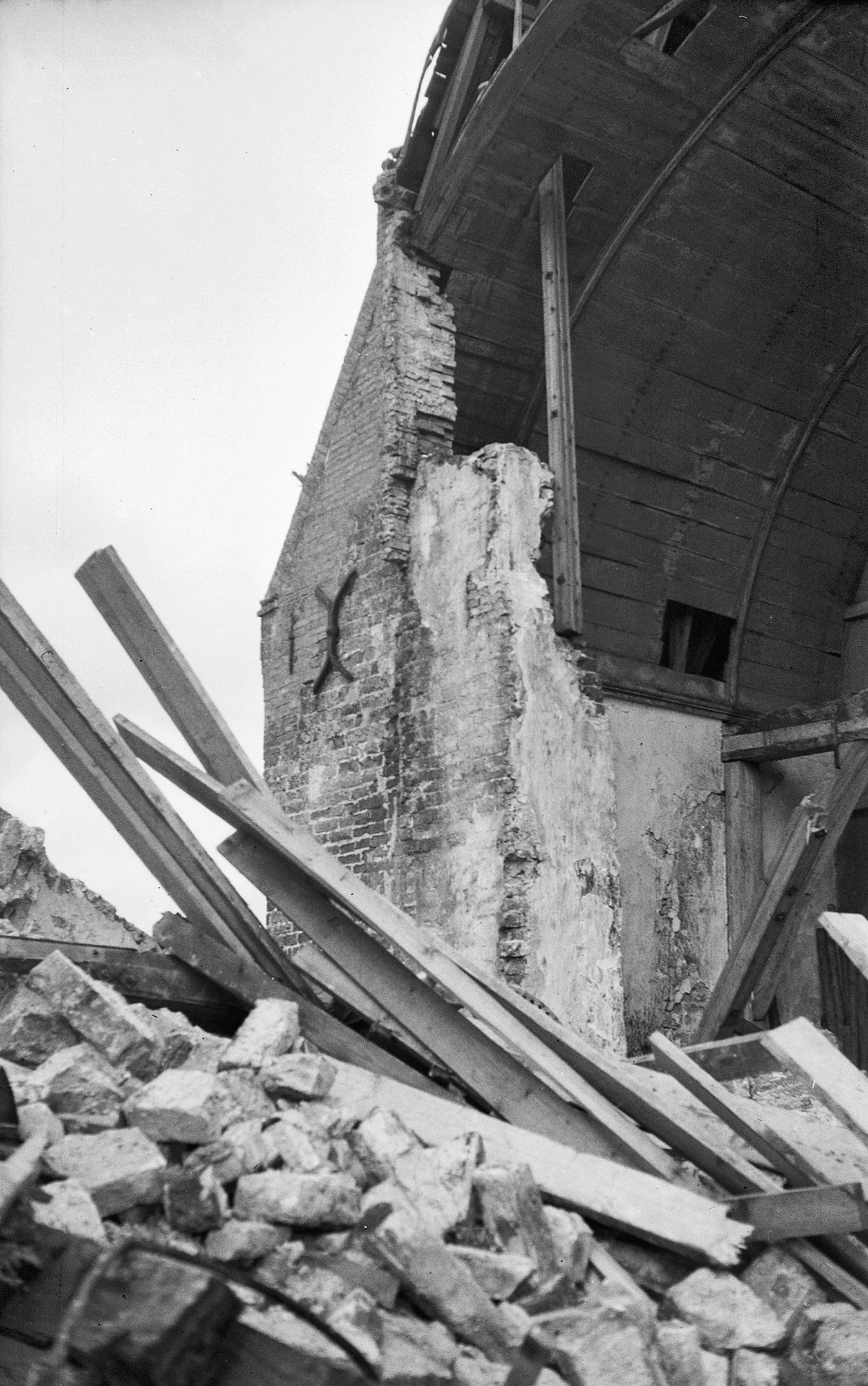

Iepenloftspul Jorwert (Frisian for 'open air play Jorwert') is a yearly event during summertime in Jorwert, the Netherlands. The event is organised since 1954 to pay for the restoration of the tower of the local church that collapsed in 1951. The play is performed in the garden of the local notary on several evenings in the end of August and the beginning of September.

Most of the translations into Frisian are by Jan Schotanus. Romke Toering has directed the plays for more than 30 years. Since 2007, the plays are directed by Tjerk Kooistra.

== Plays ==
| Year | Frysian title | Translated from | Author | Translator |
|---|---|---|---|---|
| 1954 | De klokken fan Jorwert | | | |
| 1956 | Fokke Hoara | | | |
| 1957 | De rike skoaijer | | | |
| 1958 | De seinekeapman, De útdrager | | | |
| 1959 | It singelier geheim | | | |
| 1960 | It doarp wol bestean | | | |
| 1961 | De spylman fan it roekefeest | | | |
| 1962 | In dream yn 'e simmer | | | |
| 1963 | Fanfarella | | | |
| 1964 | Dindo Maroije | | | |
| 1965 | Tûkelteammen om Amor | | | |
| 1966 | Don Quichot op 'e brulloft... | | | |
| 1967 | De helt fan Waterloo | | | |
| 1968 | Heibel om Hylpen | | | |
| 1969 | It doarp wol bestean | | | |
| 1970 | Lyk om lyk | | | |
| 1971 | Op 't kantsje ôf | Tjonge jonge... kiele kiele | | |
| 1972 | Yn 't eibertsnêst | | | |
| 1973 | Harten is troef | Bonjour Brigitte | | |
| 1974 | De waeijer | | | |
| 1975 | Yn 'e wite guds | White Horse Inn (Im weissen Rössl) | Ralph Benatzky and Robert Stolz | |
| 1976 | Amor by 't ammerfol | Paris of: Spot niet met de liefde | | |
| 1977 | De boargerman-edelman | Le Bourgeois gentilhomme | Molière | |
| 1978 | Fanfarella | | | |
| 1979 | Rûzewyntsje | Is liefde blind | | |
| 1980 | Dûnsjende dieven | Le bal des voleurs | | |
| 1981 | Heit dêr leit in lyk | Kaviaar of Spaghetti | | |
| 1982 | Tijl Ulespegel | Tijl | | |
| 1983 | Bombaarje om Bombaarje | Ralph Roister Doister | Nicholas Udall | |
| 1984 | Don Quichot yn Fryslân | Don Quichot in Brabant | | |
| 1985 | Sirkus Knie | | | |
| 1986 | Bommel en de Frisomanen | | | |
| 1987 | De fleurige froulju | The Merry Wives of Windsor | William Shakespeare | |
| 1988 | De nepert | The Miser (L'Avare) | Molière | |
| 1989 | Don Camillo en de lytse wrâld | | | |
| 1990 | De tolfte nacht (of:Wat jo wolle) | The twelfth night | | |
| 1991 | De bochel fan de Notre Dame | | | |
| 1992 | In healegeare hear | Le Bourgeois gentilhomme | Molière | |
| 1993 | Myn leave Lyske | My Fair Lady | | |
| 1994 | Midsimmernachtdream | A Midsummer Night's Dream | William Shakespeare | |
| 1995 | Anatevka | Fiddler on the roof | | |
| 1996 | In sinterske opera | The Threepenny Opera (Die Dreigroschenoper) | Bertold Brecht | |
| 1997 | Oliver | Oliver Twist | Charles Dickens | |
| 1998 | Slauerhoff & Jorwert | | | |
| 1999 | Zorbá | Zorba | | |
| 2000 | Venetiaans Karnaval | La vedova scaltra | Carlo Goldoni | |
| 2001 | Utblaasd | Brassed off | Mark Herman | |
| 2002 | Feint fan twa Masters | The Servant of Two Masters (Il Servitore di due padroni) | Carlo Goldoni | |
| 2003 | Ik wol spylje | Shakespeare in Love | Marc Norman, Tom Stoppard | |
| 2004 | Op hoop fan segen | | | |
| 2005 | Kabaret | | | |
| 2006 | Full Monty - Alles út | The Full Monty | Simon Beaufoy | |
| 2007 | Dûbele Nelson | | | |
| 2008 | Jou my wjukken | As It Is in heaven | Kay Pollak, Anders Nyberg, Ola Olsson, Carin Pollak, Margaretha Pollak | |
| 2009 | Tuskentiid | | | |
| 2010 | It Feest | | | |
| 2011 | Bohemia | | | |
| 2012 | De Goede, de Minne en de Lillike | | | |
| 2013 | De kloklieder fan Nijdaam | | | |
| 2014 | Maraton | | | |
| 2015 | Augustus | | | |
| 2016 | London '68 | | | |
| 2017 | It Bjusterbaarlike foarfal fan de hûn yn de nacht | | | |
| 2018 | De famylje Bellier | | | |
