= Oudega =

Oudega may refer to:

- Oudega, Gaasterlân-Sleat, a village in Friesland, Netherlands
- Oudega, Smallingerland, a village in Friesland, Netherlands
- Oudega, Súdwest-Fryslân, a village in Friesland, Netherlands
