= Doris Mooltsje, Oudega =

Windmill in Oudega, Netherlands

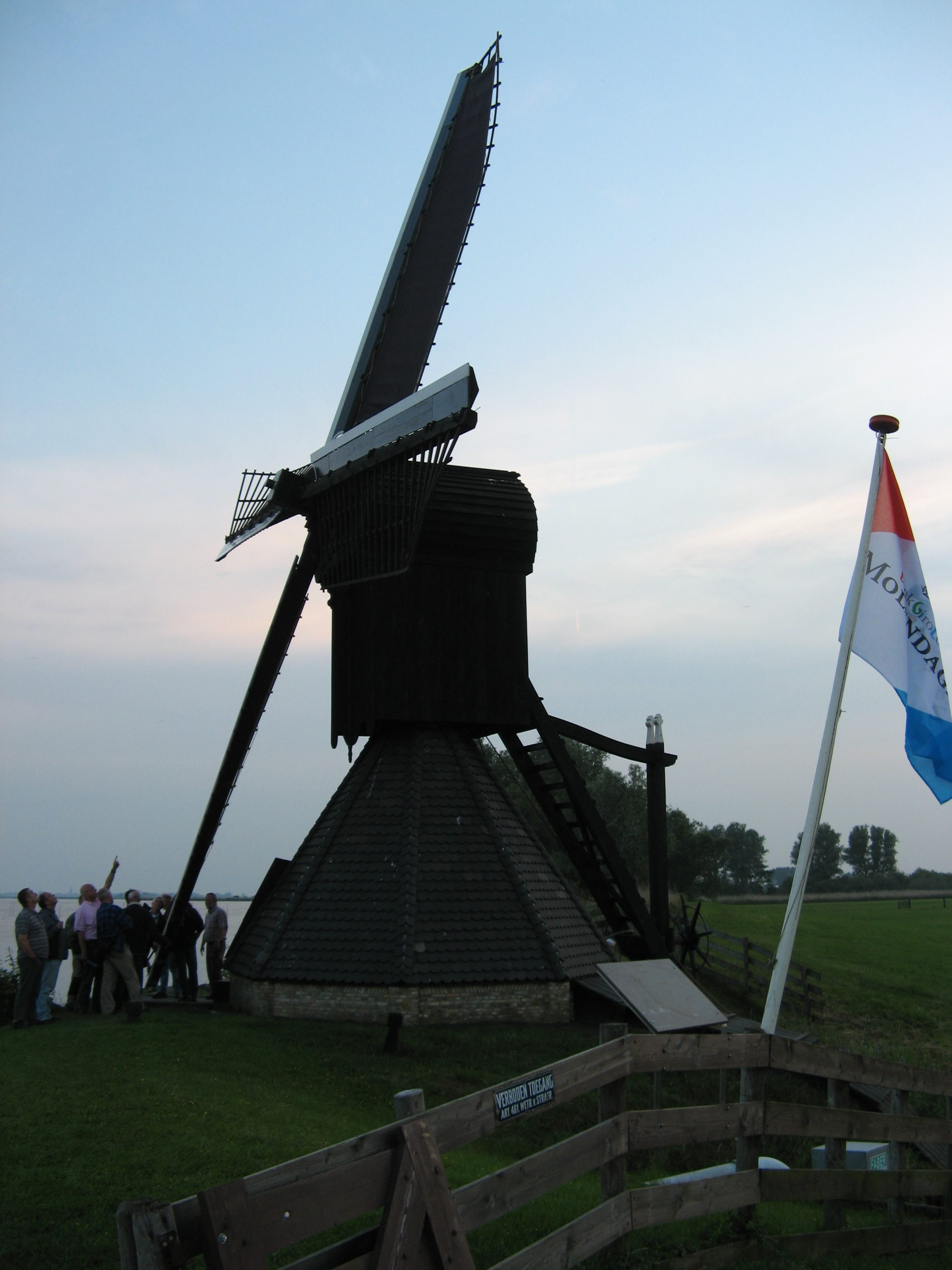
- Doris Mooltsje in 2011
- Interactive map of Doris Mooltsje, Oudega

Origin
- Mill name: Doris Mooltsje
- Mill location: Oudega (W) next to lake De Brekken
- Coordinates: 52°59′53″N 5°32′12″E
- Operator: Stichting Doris Mooltsje
- Year built: 18th century, restored 1995

Information
- Purpose: Drainage mill
- Type: Hollow post
- Roundhouse storeys: Single storey roundhouse
- No. of sails: Four sails
- Type of sails: Common sails
- Windshaft: Wood
- Winding: Tailpole and winch
- Type of pump: Archimedes' screw

Doris Mooltsje is a drainage mill near the village of Oudega, Friesland, Netherlands. It is a hollow post windmill of the type called spinnenkop by the Dutch. The mill is listed as a Rijksmonument, number 527647 and has been restored to working order in 1998.

== History ==
An inscription found on the substructure dates the mill to before 1790, making it one of the oldest still existing drainage mills in Friesland. It was named Doris Mooltsje after the last owner, Doris Hoekstra. In 1934 the windmill was partly dismantled, only the substructure was kept to house a pumping station. A re-allotment project made it superfluous and the remnants of the mill were to be torn down. Stichting Doris Mooltsje was founded in 1992 in an attempt to save and restore the windmill. The restoration project encountered a setback when the provincial government refused to put the mill on the provincial list of monuments, thereby creating difficulties in obtaining the necessary funds. Much work was done by volunteer labour to save costs on hiring a millwright. The mill was officially reopened in 1998.

== Description ==
Doris Mooltsje is what the Dutch describe as a spinnenkop (English: spiderhead mill). It is a small hollow post mill winded by a winch. The four common sails have a span of 15.50 metres (50 ft 10 in), making it one of the largest of its type. (Only flourmill De Vlijt with a span of 16.40 metres (53 ft 10 in) and the Roekmolen, span 16 metres (52 ft 6 in) are larger). The sails are carried on a wooden windshaft. The brake wheel on the windshaft drives the wallower at the top of the upright shaft in the body, which passed through the main post into the substructure. At the bottom of the upright shaft, the crown wheel drives the Archimedes' screw. The screw is 1 metre (3 ft 3 in) in diameter and raises the water 159 centimetres (5 ft 3 in). The body (called head on a spinnenkop) is weatherboarded, the octagonal substructure is covered with slate tiles and rests on a brick base.

== Public access ==
The mill is open to the public on most Saturdays and by appointment. It is located on the bank of the lake Oudegaaster Brekken next to a recreational bicycle path.
