= Protestant church of Oudega =

Church in Oudega, Netherlands

Protestant church of Oudega Saint Agnes church
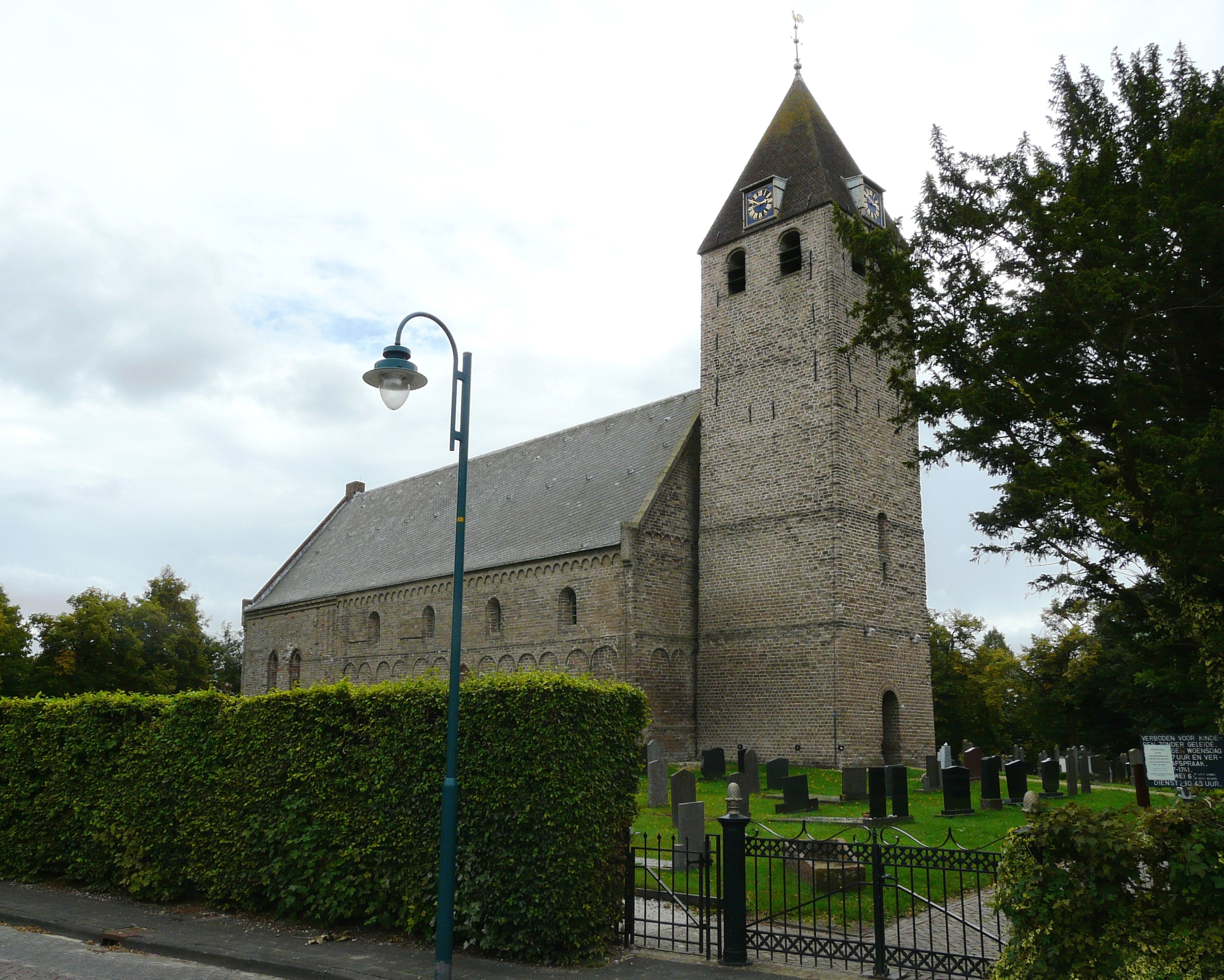
- Church of Oudega
- Protestant church of Oudega; Saint Agnes church
- 53.1253°N 6.0009°E

History
- Dedication: Before the Reformation, to Saint Agnes

Specifications
- Materials: Tuffstone

The Protestant church of Oudega or Saint Agatha church is a religious building in Oudega, Netherlands, one of the many medieval churches in Friesland.

The Romanesque church was built in the early 12th century out of tuffstone and has a tower from c. 1250. In the 14th century the church was lengthened with a straight closed choir. Most of the building is of tufa, but the Gothic former northern entrance is of brick.

The monumental Pipe organ was built in 1875 by L. van Dam & Zn. from Leeuwarden and expanded by Bakker & Timmenga in 1922.

The church is located on the Buorren 1 and was once a Roman Catholic church dedicated to Saint Agnes but became a Protestant church after the Protestant Reformation. It is listed as a Rijksmonument, number 33989 and is rated with a very high historical value.
