= Nijega =

Nijega Nyegea
- Village
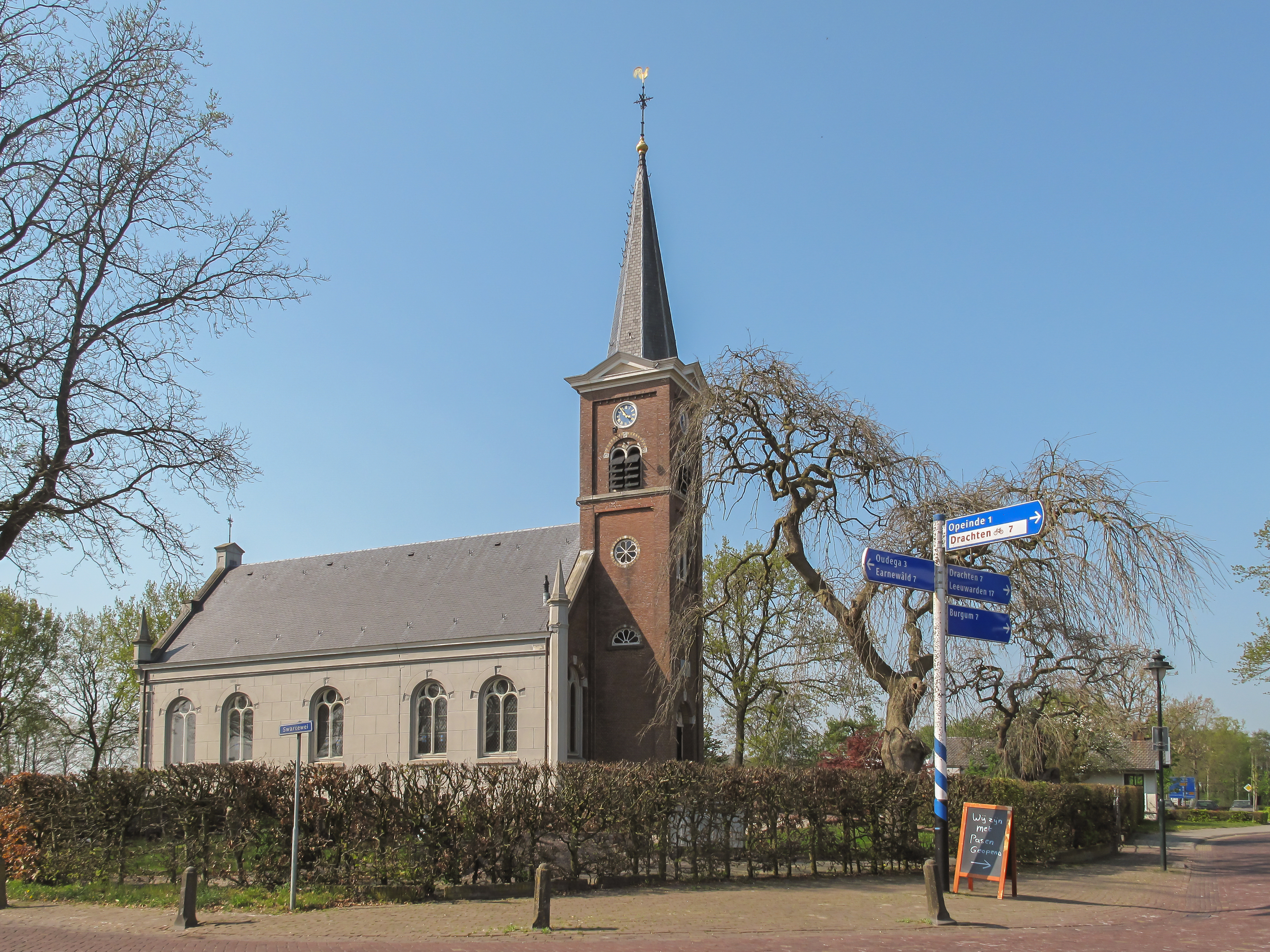
- Nijega, reformed church

- Flag Coat of arms

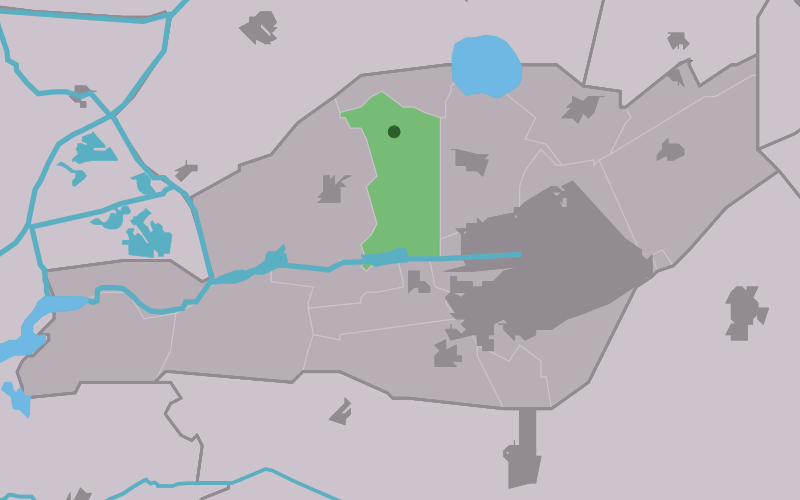
- Location in Smallingerland municipality

- Location in the Netherlands Nijega (Netherlands)
- Country: Netherlands
- Province: Friesland
- Municipality: Smallingerland

Area
  - Total: 8.75 km^{2} (3.38 sq mi)
- Elevation: 0.8 m (2.6 ft)

Population (2021)
  - Total: 470
  - Density: 54/km^{2} (140/sq mi)
- Time zone: UTC+1 (CET)
  - Summer (DST): UTC+2 (CEST)
- Postal code: 9217
- Dialing code: 0512

Nijega (West Frisian: Nyegea) is a village in Smallingerland municipality in the province of Friesland, the Netherlands. It had a population of around 461 in January 2017.

The village was first mentioned in 1412 as Nyegae, and means "new village". Nije (new) has been added to distinguish from Oudega. The Dutch Reformed church dates from at least 1381, and has been modified in 1850, and partially rebuilt in 1894.

Nijega was home to 165 people in 1840. The former elementary school was used as the village centre, however the building was in poor share. In 2003, a village centre opened next door to the Kommissiehuys.

== Gallery ==
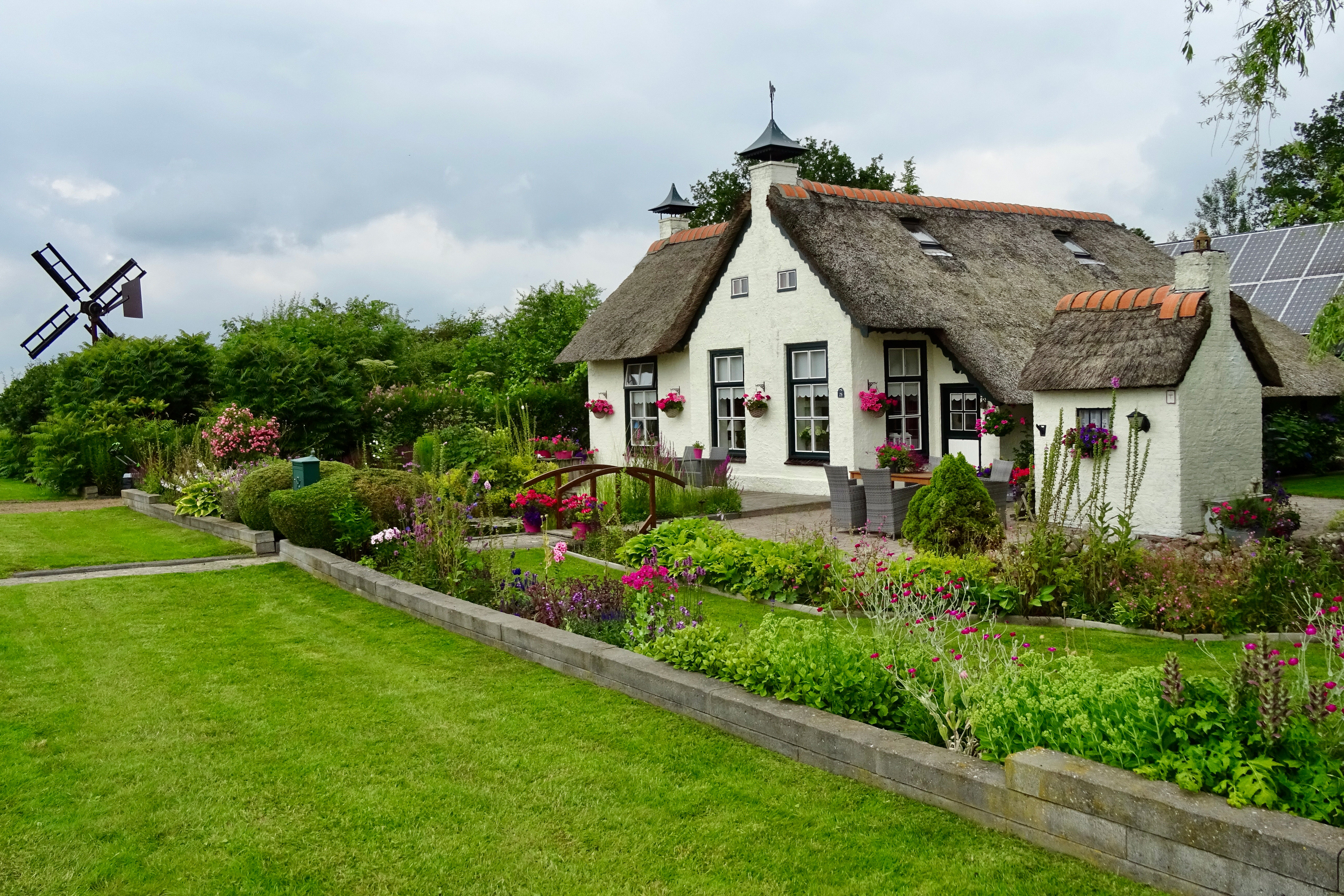
Farm in Nijega

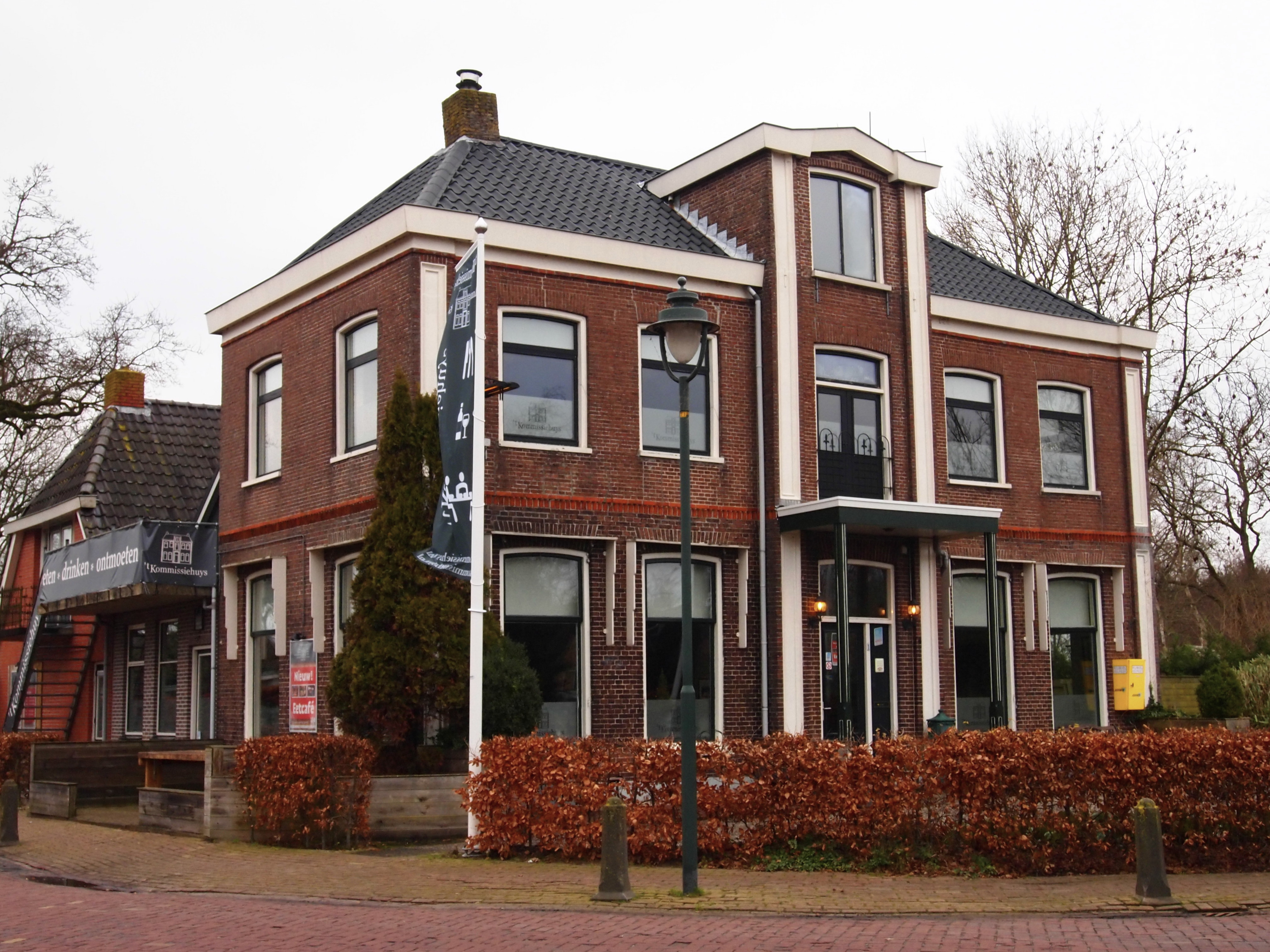
Café-restaurant Kommissiehuys

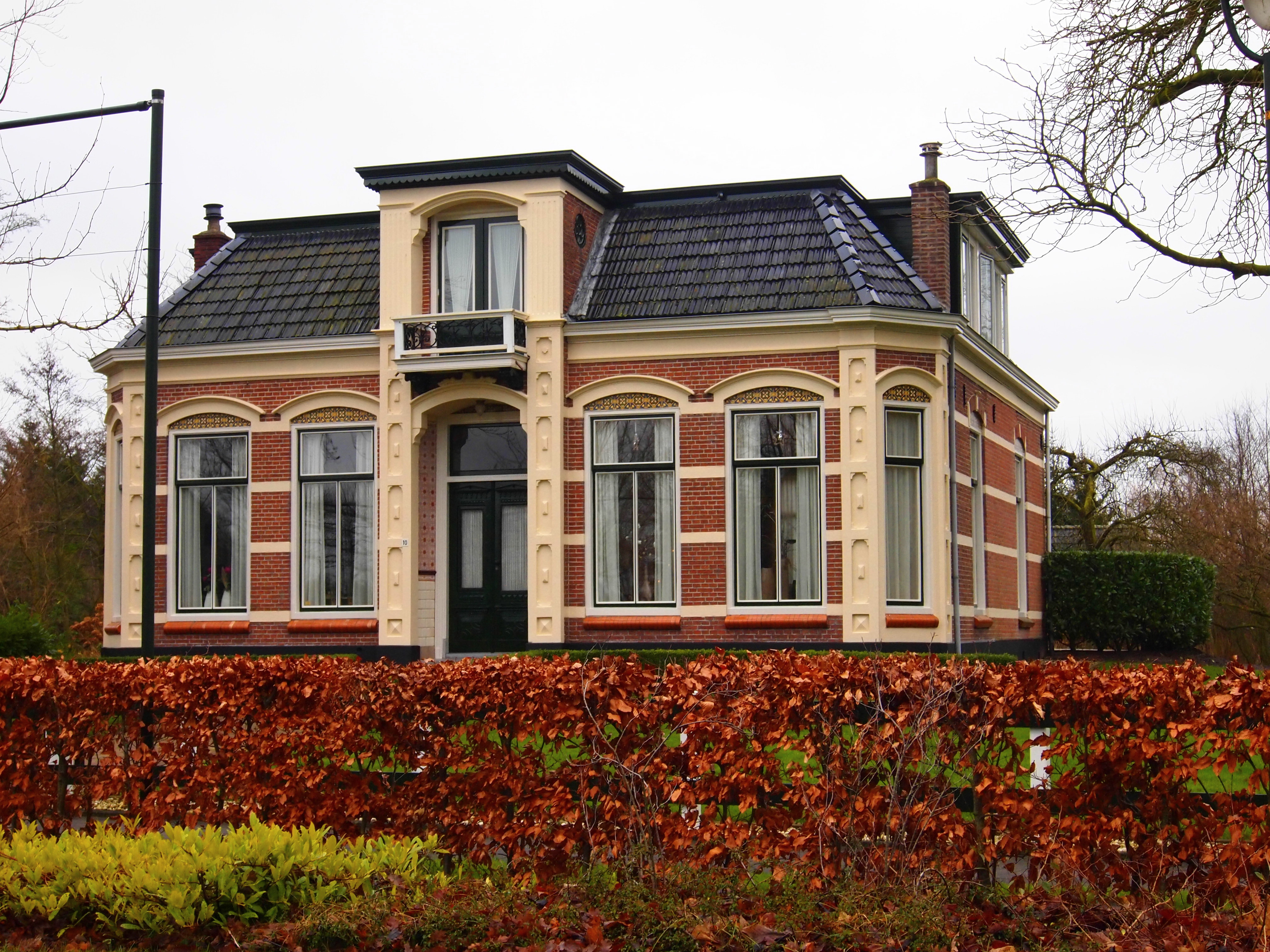
Villa in Nijega

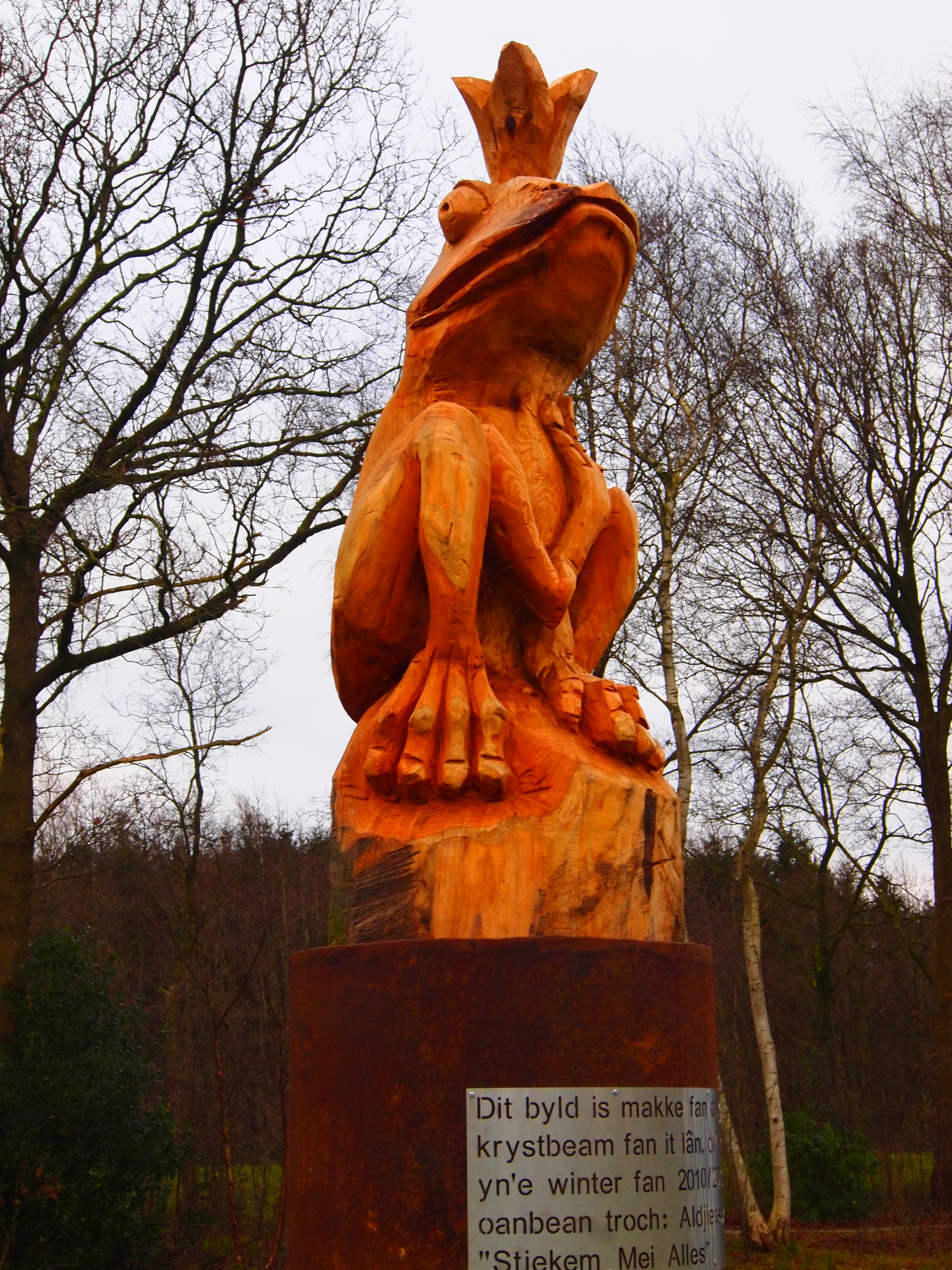
Prince Frog statue
