= Tijl =

Tijl is a masculine Dutch given name. Notable people with the name include:

- Tijl Beckand (born 1974), Dutch television presenter and comedian
- Tijl De Decker (2001–2023), Belgian cyclist
- Tijl Faveyts, Belgian operatic bass
