= Oudega, Súdwest-Fryslân =

Oudega Aldegea
- Village
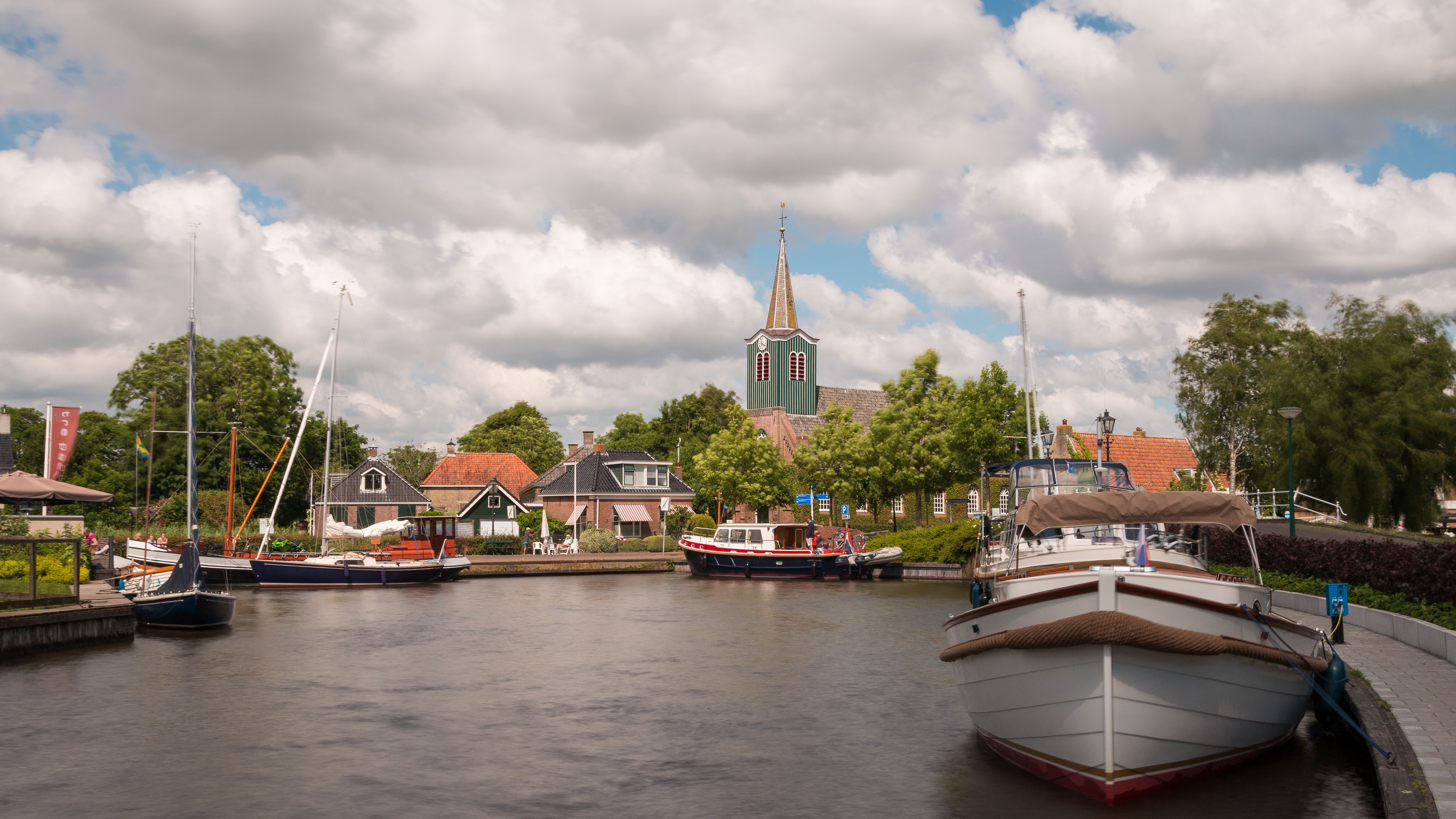

- Flag Coat of arms

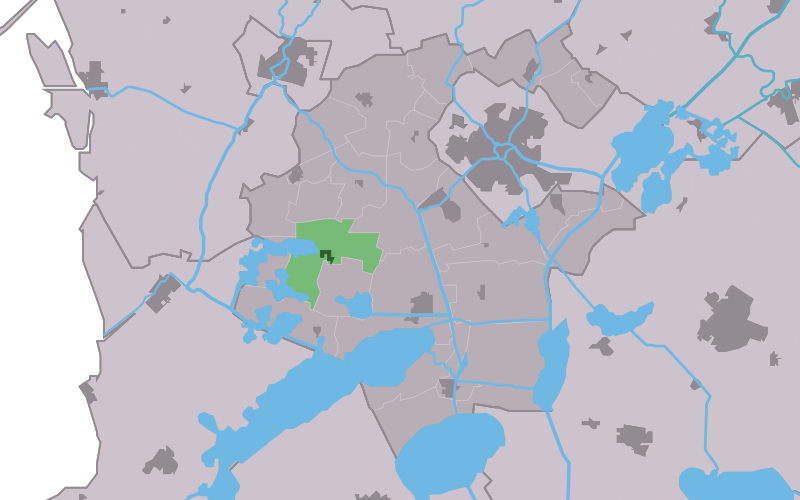
- Location in the former Wymbritseradiel municipality

- Location in the Netherlands Oudega (Netherlands)
- Country: Netherlands
- Province: Friesland
- Municipality: Súdwest-Fryslân
- Postal code: 8614
- Area code: 0515

Oudega (West Frisian: Aldegea) is a village in Súdwest-Fryslân in the province of Friesland, the Netherlands. It had a population of around 730 in January 2017.

It is often called Oudega W to avoid confusion with the other villages with the same name, with the W referring to the former municipally Wymbritseradiel. The location of the village on the banks of the lake Aldegeaster Brekken makes it a popular destination for boating, windsurfing and sailing. The village church and the windmill Doris Mooltsje are both Rijksmonument.

== History ==
The village was first mentioned in 1245 as Aldakerke, and means "old neighbourhood". Oudega developed as a canal village in the middle ages. The village used to be surrounded by lakes and pools.

The Dutch Reformed church was built in 1755 partially on the foundations of its medieval predecessor. It was enlarged around 1870 and a tower was added. The polder mill Doris Mooltsje was built before 1800. In 1935, the top was removed and a pumping station was installed inside the wind mill. Between 1995 and 1998, it was restored.

Oudega was home to 245 people in 1840. Before 2011, the village was part of the Wymbritseradiel municipality.

== Gallery ==
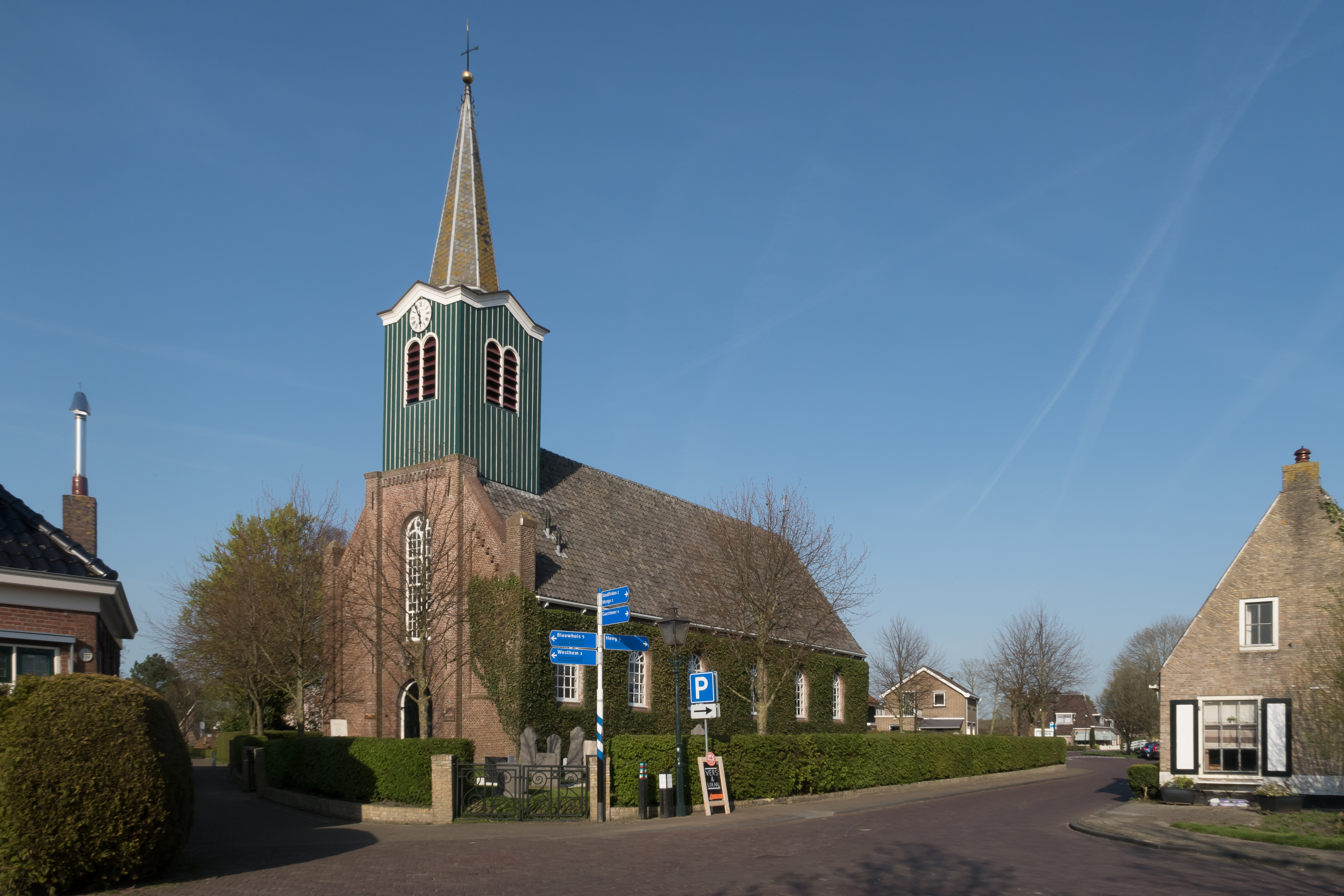
Church of Oudega

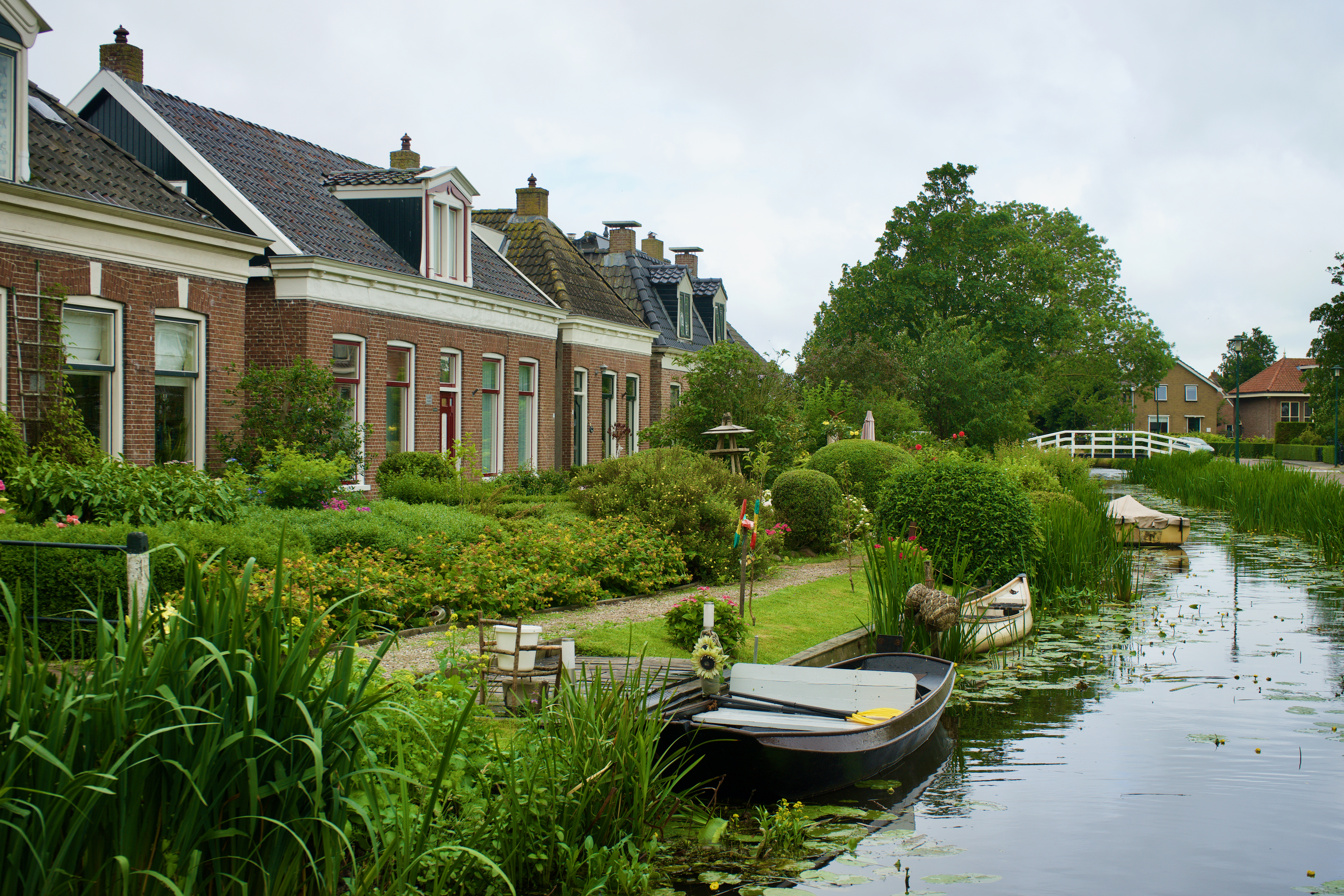
View along the canal

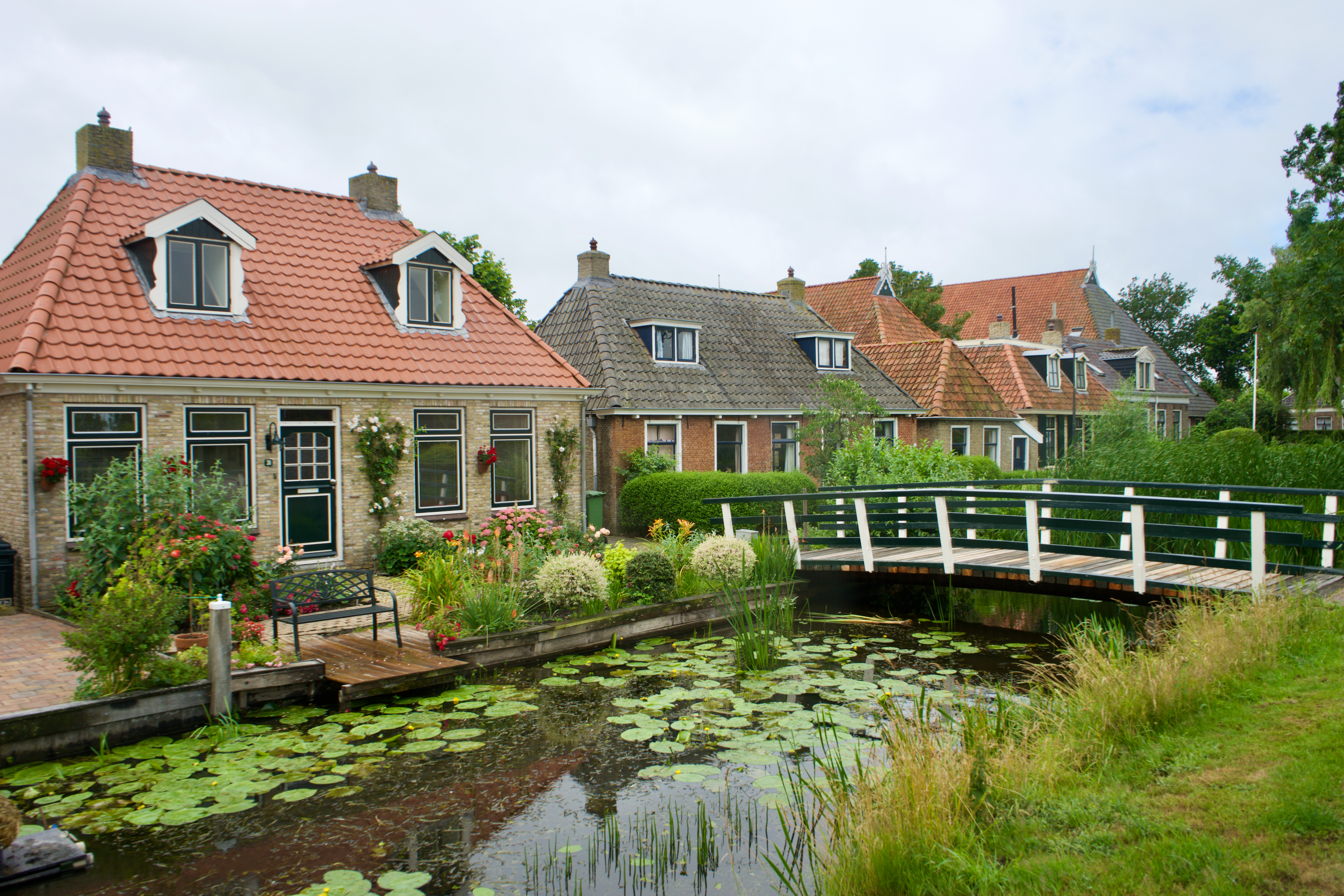
Houses in Oudega

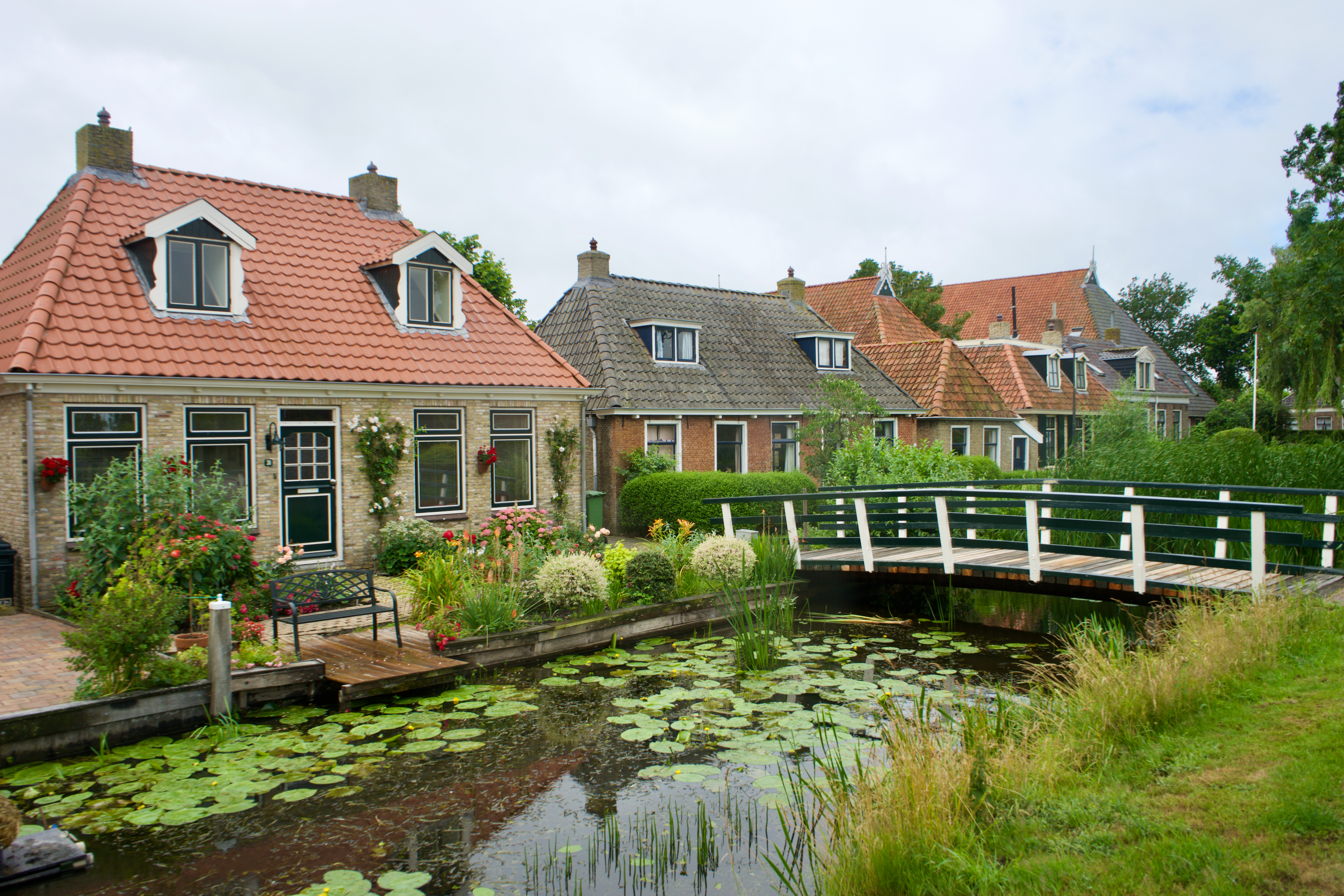
View on Oudega
