= Protestant church of Jorwert =

Church in Jorwert, Netherlands

Protestant church of Jorwert Saint Radboud’s church
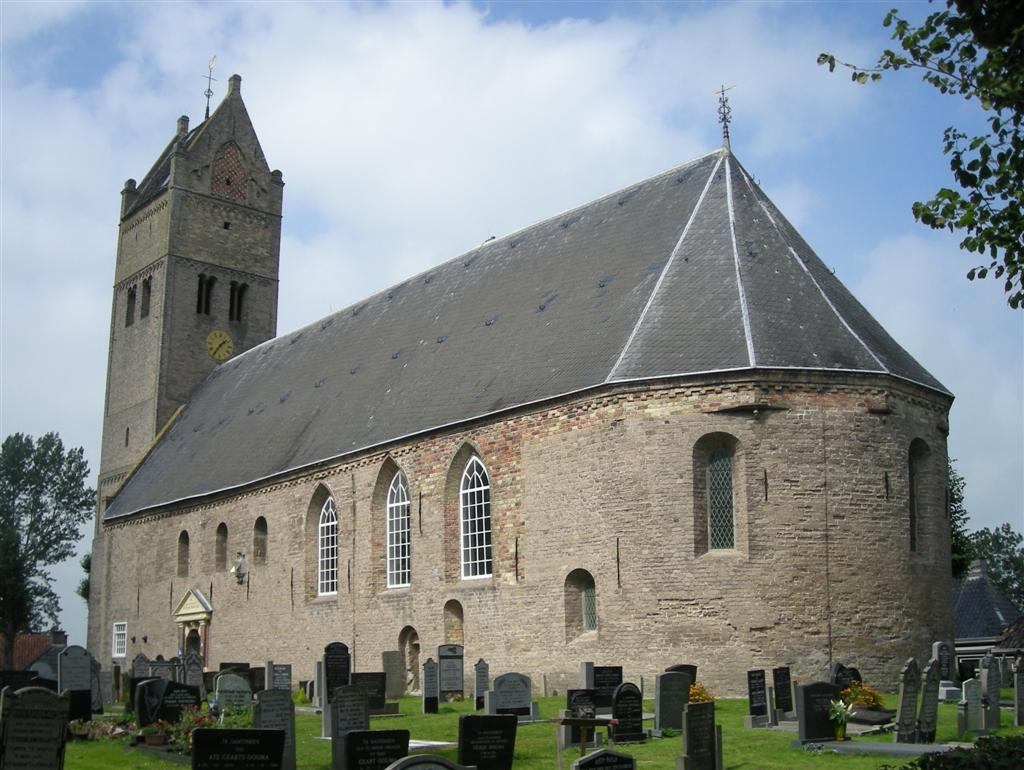
- Church of Jorwert
- Protestant church of Jorwert; Saint Radboud’s church
- 53.1458°N 5.7112°E

History
- Dedication: Before the Reformation, to Saint Radboud

Specifications
- Materials: Tuffstone

The Protestant church of Jorwert or Saint Radboud's church is a medieval religious building in Jorwert, Friesland, Netherlands.

It is an early 12th-century Romanesque church with a long round closed choir and a late 12th-century tower. The church is largely built of tuffstone. In 1951 the tower collapsed, soon after it, it was rebuilt. The monumental Pipe organ of the church was built in 1799 by Albertus van Gruisen.

It was originally a Roman Catholic church dedicated to Saint Radboud, but became a Protestant temple after the Protestant Reformation. It is listed as a Rijksmonument, number 8494. The building is located on the Sluytermanwei 4 and is in the care of Stichting Alde Fryske Tsjerken (Old Frisian Churches Foundation).

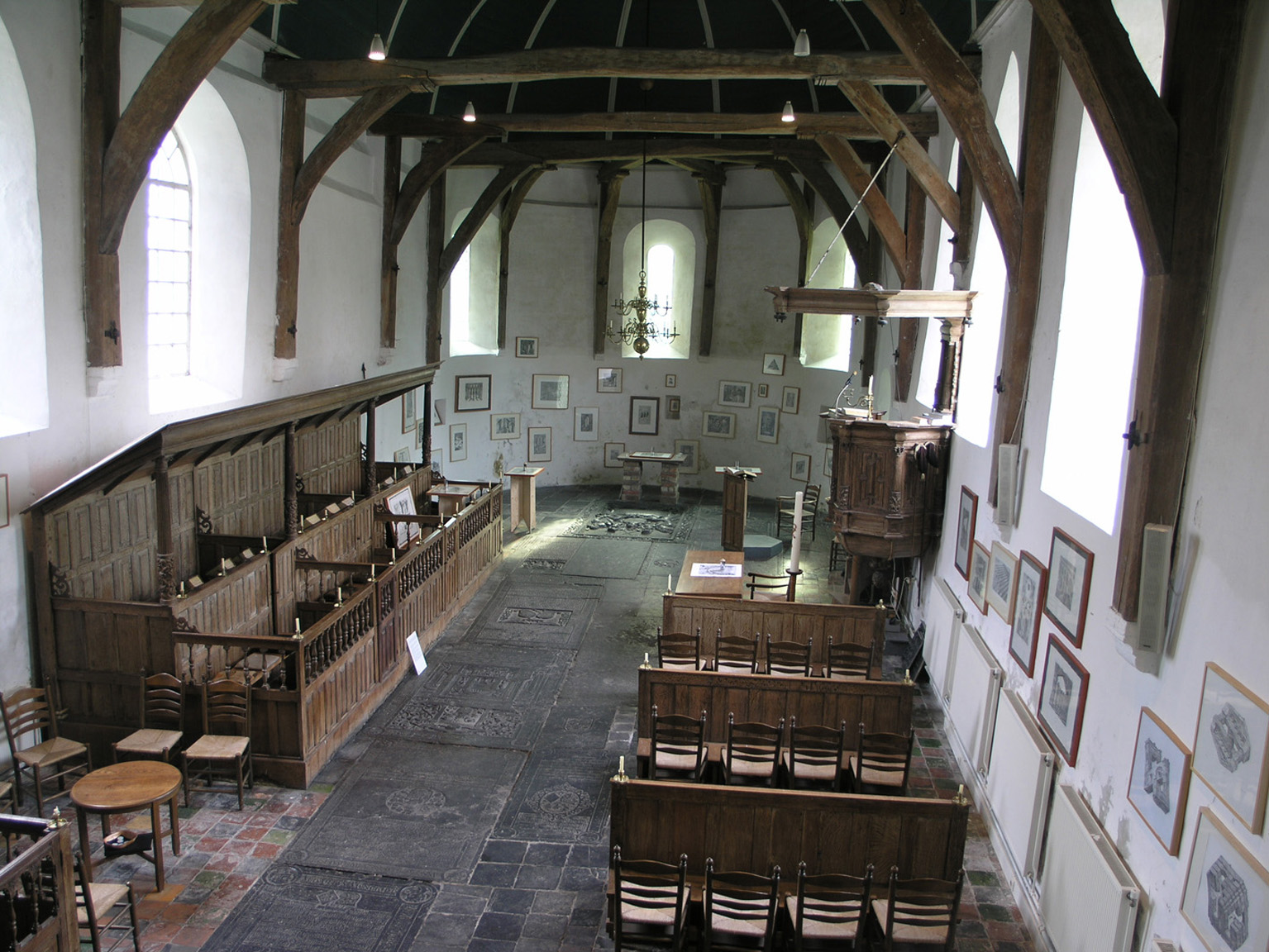
Art exhibition in the "Redbad Church": etchings by Istvan Orosz
