= Jorwert =

- Village
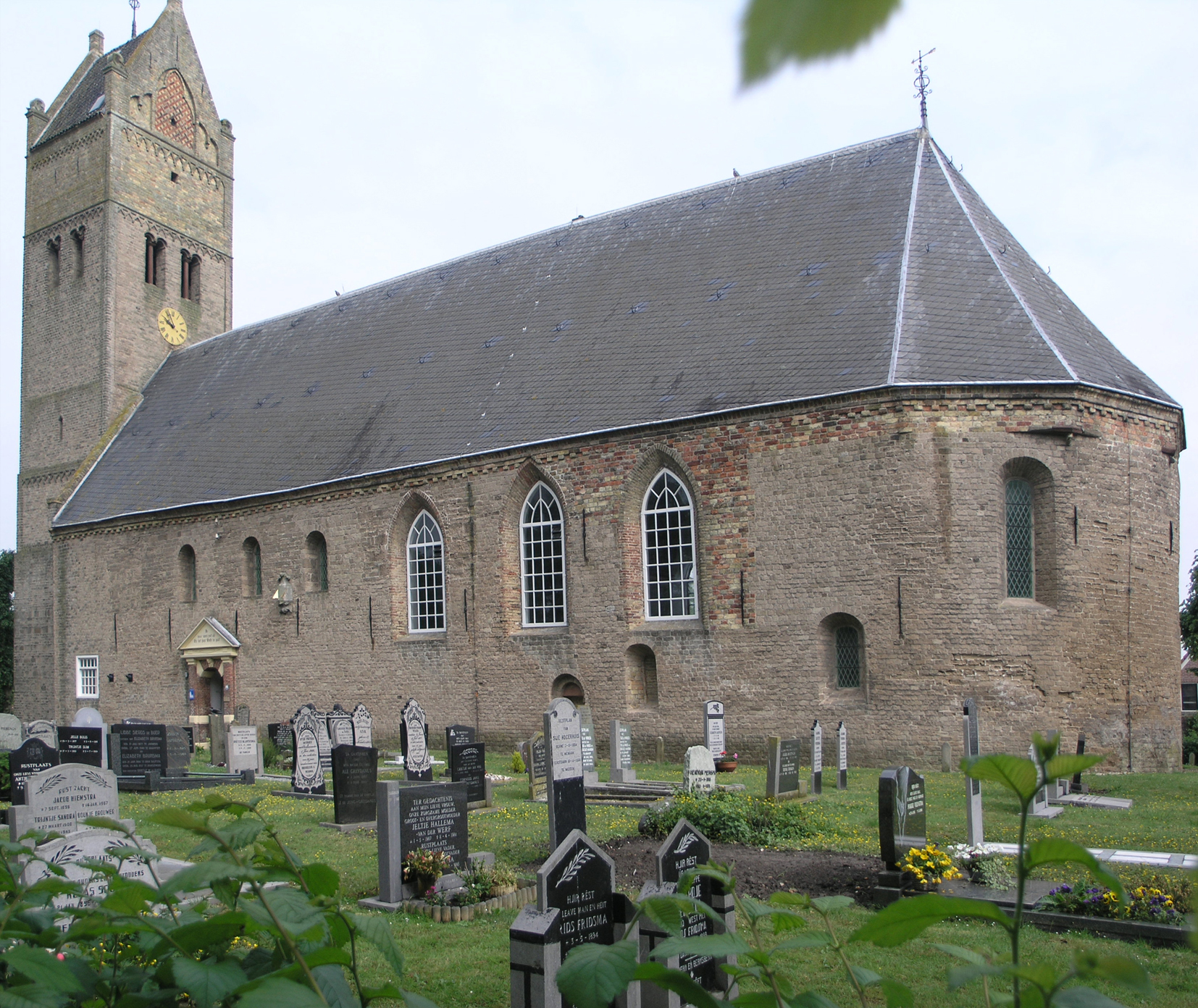
- The "Redbad Church"

- Flag Coat of arms

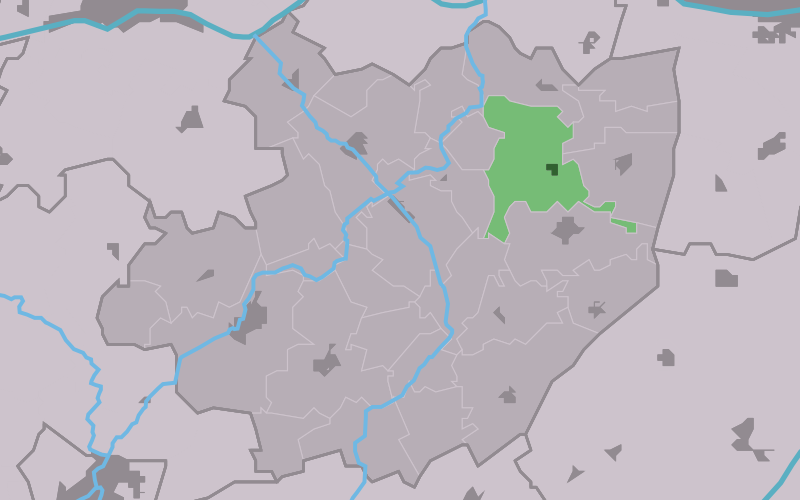
- Location in the former Littenseradiel municipality

- Location in the Netherlands Jorwert (Netherlands)
- Country: Netherlands
- Province: Friesland
- Municipality: Leeuwarden

Area
  - Total: 7.18 km^{2} (2.77 sq mi)
- Elevation: 0.3 m (0.98 ft)

Population (2021)
  - Total: 310
  - Density: 43/km^{2} (110/sq mi)
- Time zone: UTC+1 (CET)
  - Summer (DST): UTC+2 (CEST)
- Postal code: 9023
- Dialing code: 058

Jorwert (Dutch: Jorwerd) is a village in Friesland, in the municipality of Leeuwarden, with a population of 342 in January 2017.

The nickname for inhabitants of Jorwert is "Dweilstikken", meaning poor people who are dependent of rich ones. The village is built around a central "terp", a man-made mound between 4 and 8 feet tall built to provide relief from the high tides of the sea before dykes were constructed around the 10th century.

== History ==
Before 2018, the village was part of the Littenseradiel municipality and before 1984 it belonged to Baarderadeel municipality.

== Book ==
Dutch writer Geert Mak used Jorwert as the hook for his book Jorwerd: The Death of the Village in late 20th century Europe (ISBN 1-86046-803-9) - though the Dutch title Hoe God verdween uit Jorwerd translates as How God disappeared from Jorwerd. Mak describes the changes that have affected the village over the last century, and writes eloquently about the people and their experiences.

== Church ==
The centre of the village is the "Redbad church", which dates back to the 12th century. The church tower collapsed in 1951, but has since been rebuilt; the action to raise funds for the restoration included an open air play Iepenloftspul Jorwert, which is still held every summer in the garden of the local notary.

== Gallery ==
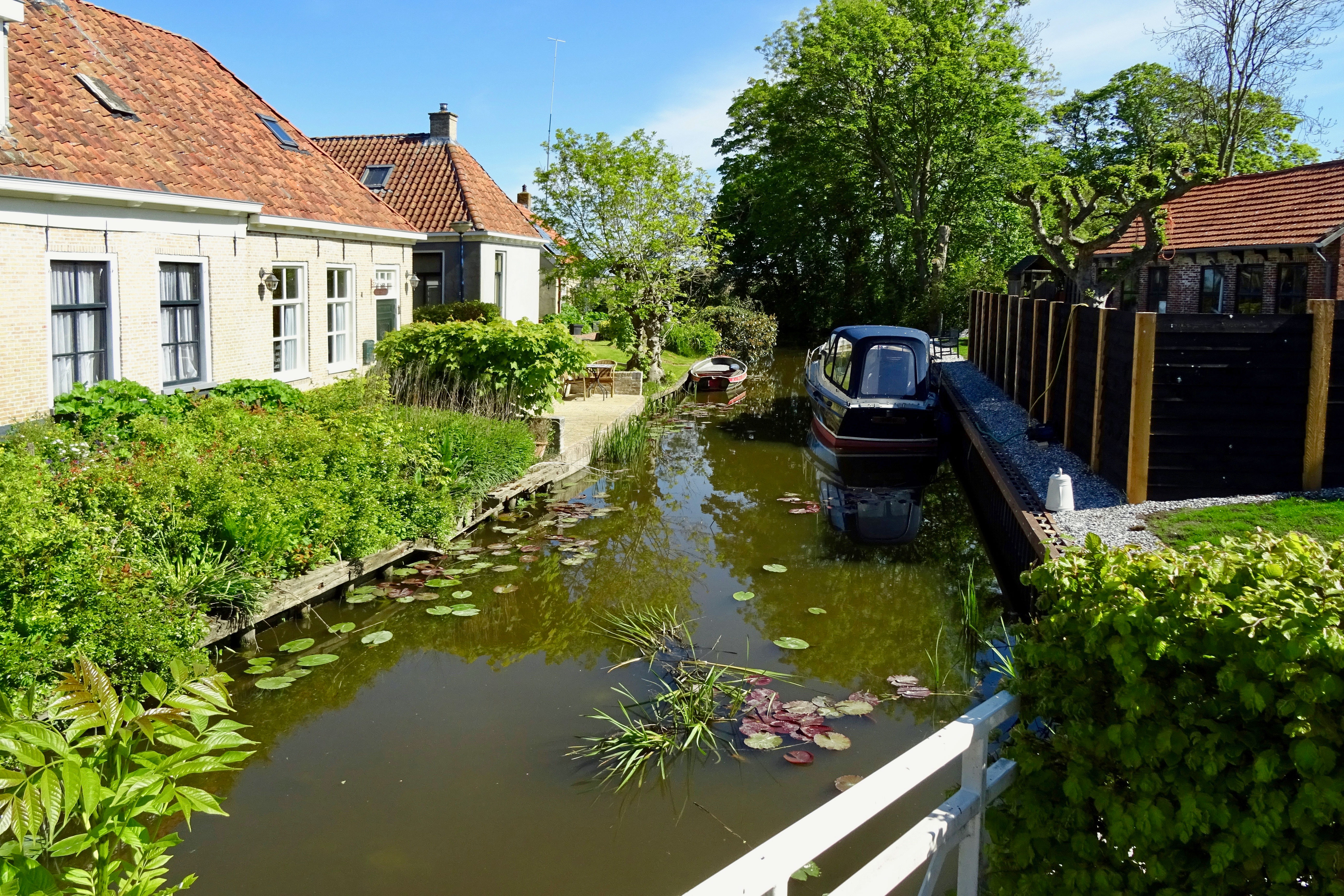
Canal in Jorwert

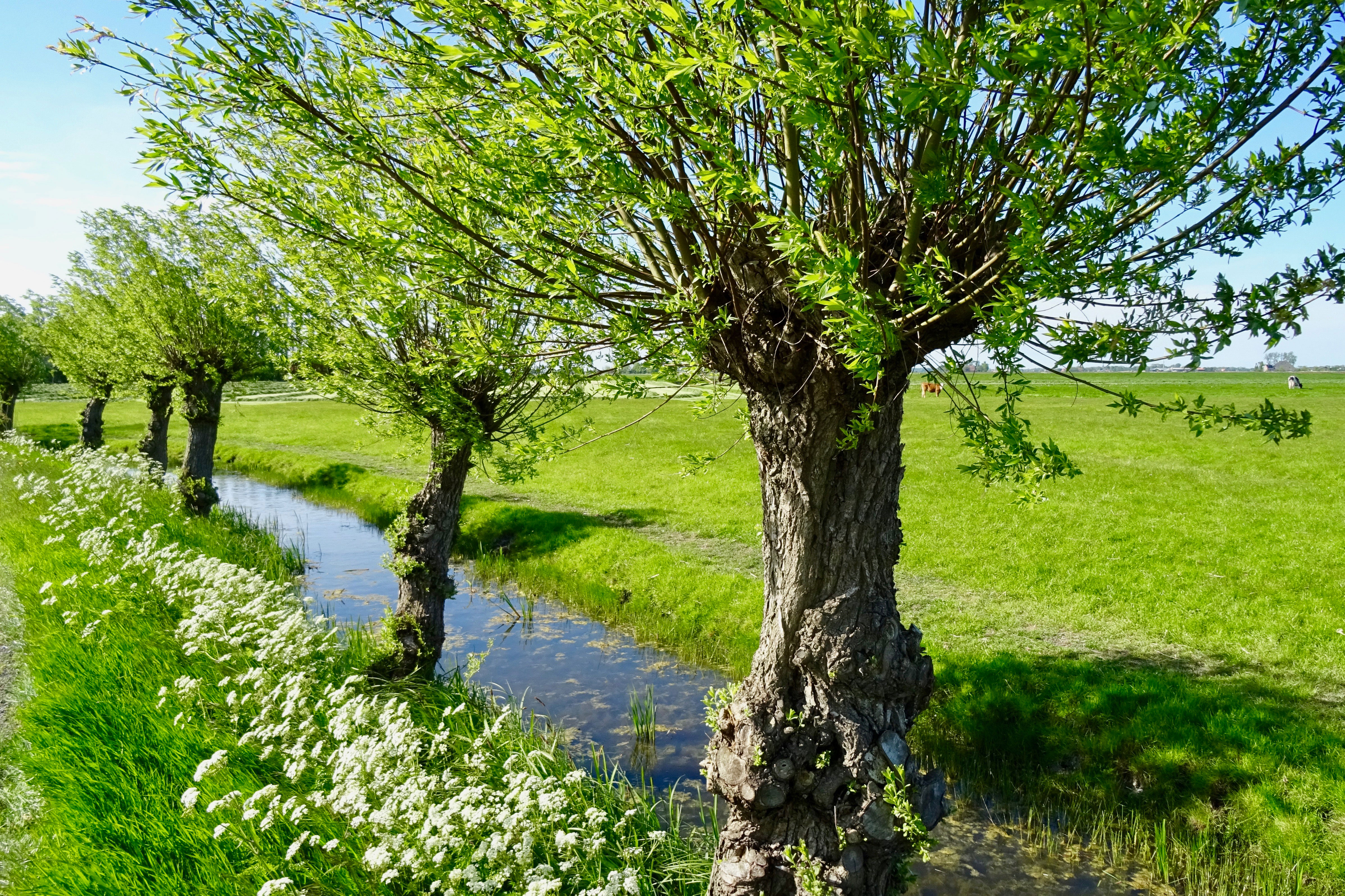
Landscape near Jorwert

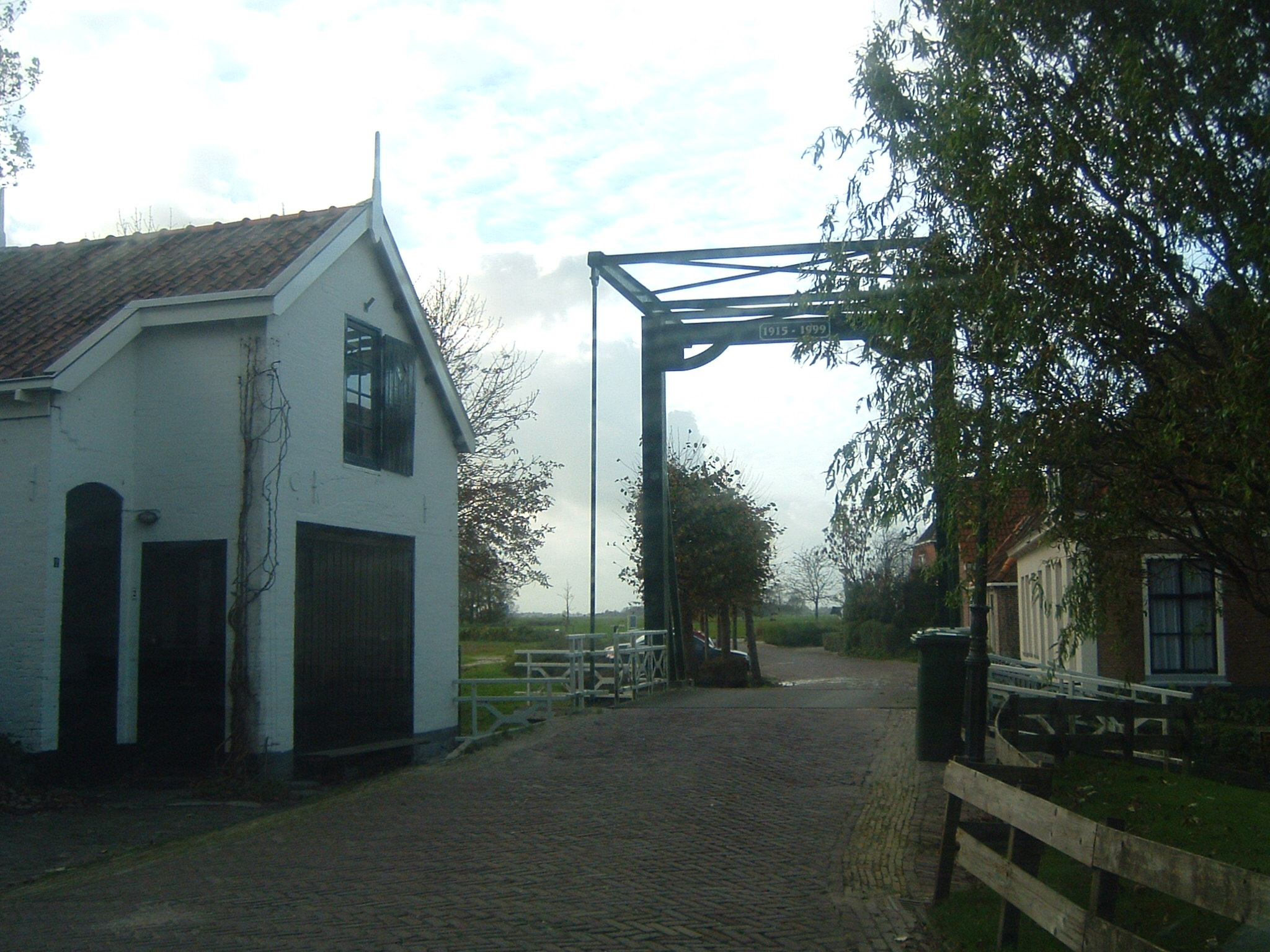
Bridge in Jorwert

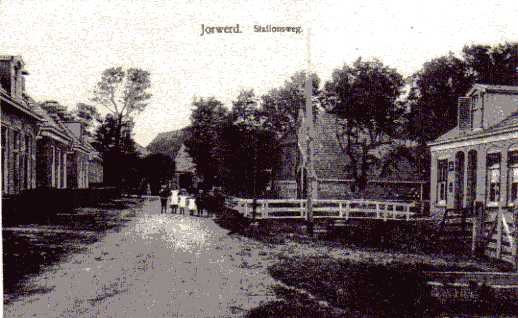
Jorwerd in 1910
