= Oudega, Smallingerland =

Oudega Aldegea
- Village
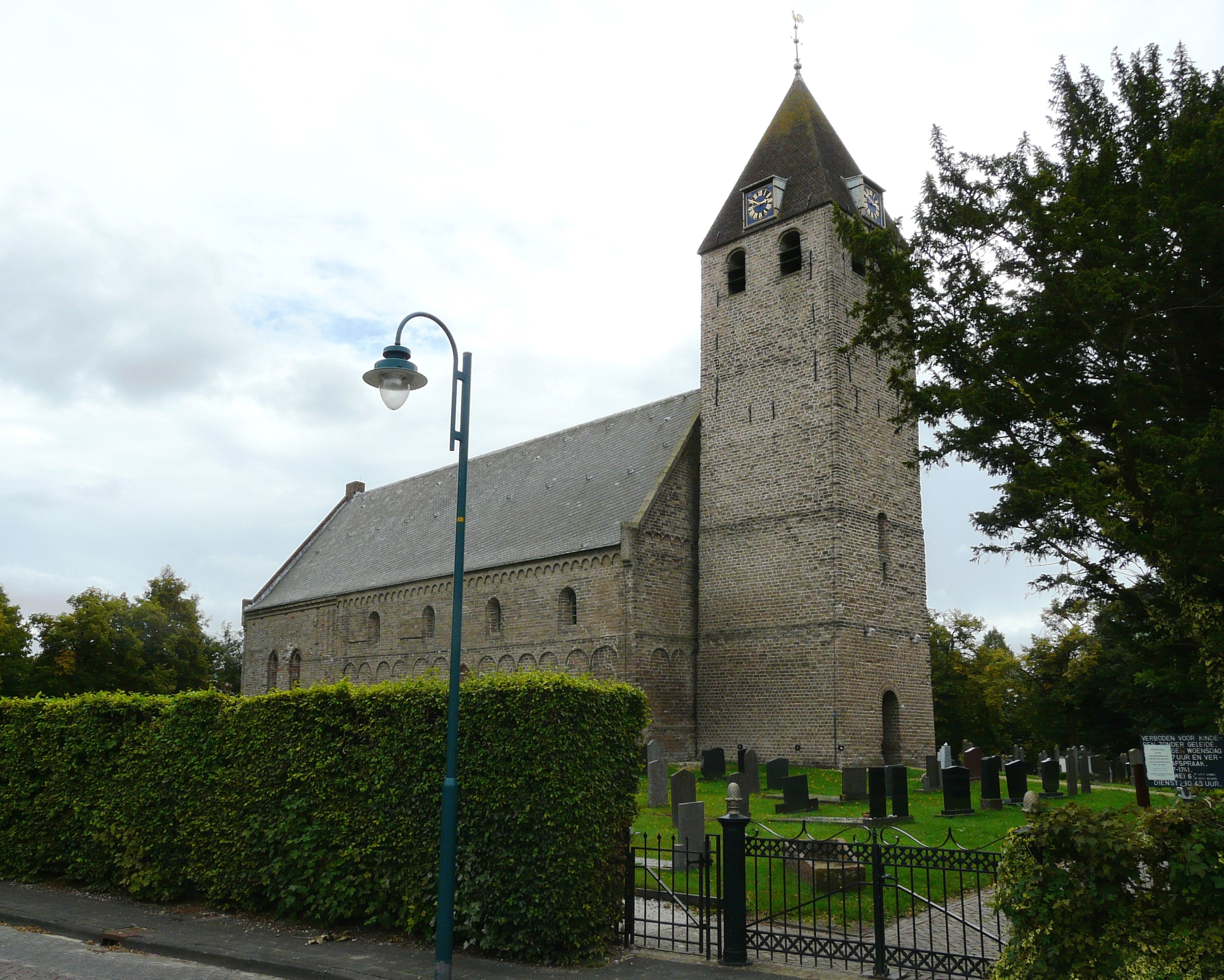
- St Agatha church

- Flag Coat of arms

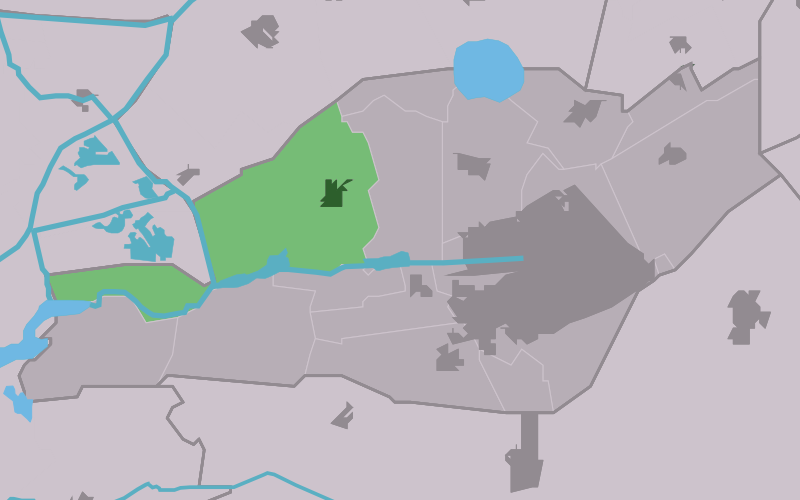
- Location in Smallingerland municipality

- Location in the Netherlands Oudega (Netherlands)
- Country: Netherlands
- Province: Friesland
- Municipality: Smallingerland

Area
  - Total: 21.00 km^{2} (8.11 sq mi)
- Elevation: 1.7 m (5.6 ft)

Population (2021)
  - Total: 1,675
  - Density: 79.76/km^{2} (206.6/sq mi)
- Time zone: UTC+1 (CET)
  - Summer (DST): UTC+2 (CEST)
- Postal code: 9216
- Dialing code: 0512

Oudega (West Frisian: Aldegea) is a village in Smallingerland in the province of Friesland, the Netherlands. It had a population of around 1,701 in January 2017.

== History ==
The village was first mentioned in 1439 as Aldga, and means "old village". Oude (old) has been added to distinguish from Nijega. Oudega developed in a sandy ridge in the early Middle Ages. Until 1795, it was the capital of the grietenij (predecessor of the municipality) Smallingerland. The Protestant church was built in the early 12th century. The tower was built around 1250. The church was modified several times during its history and restored in 1921.

Oudega was home to 603 people in 1840.

== Notable buildings ==
- The Protestant church of Oudega

== Gallery ==
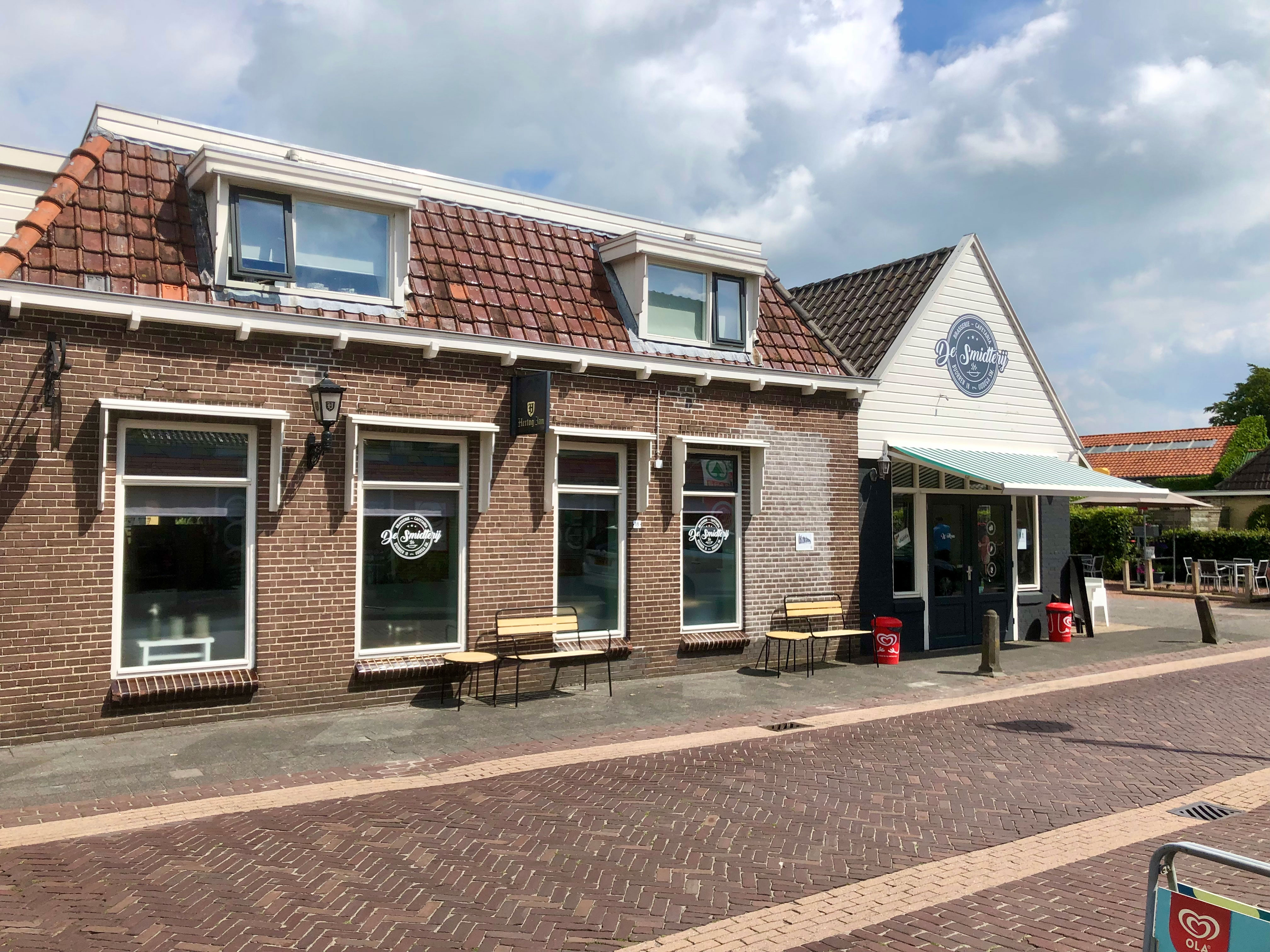
Former forge in Oudega

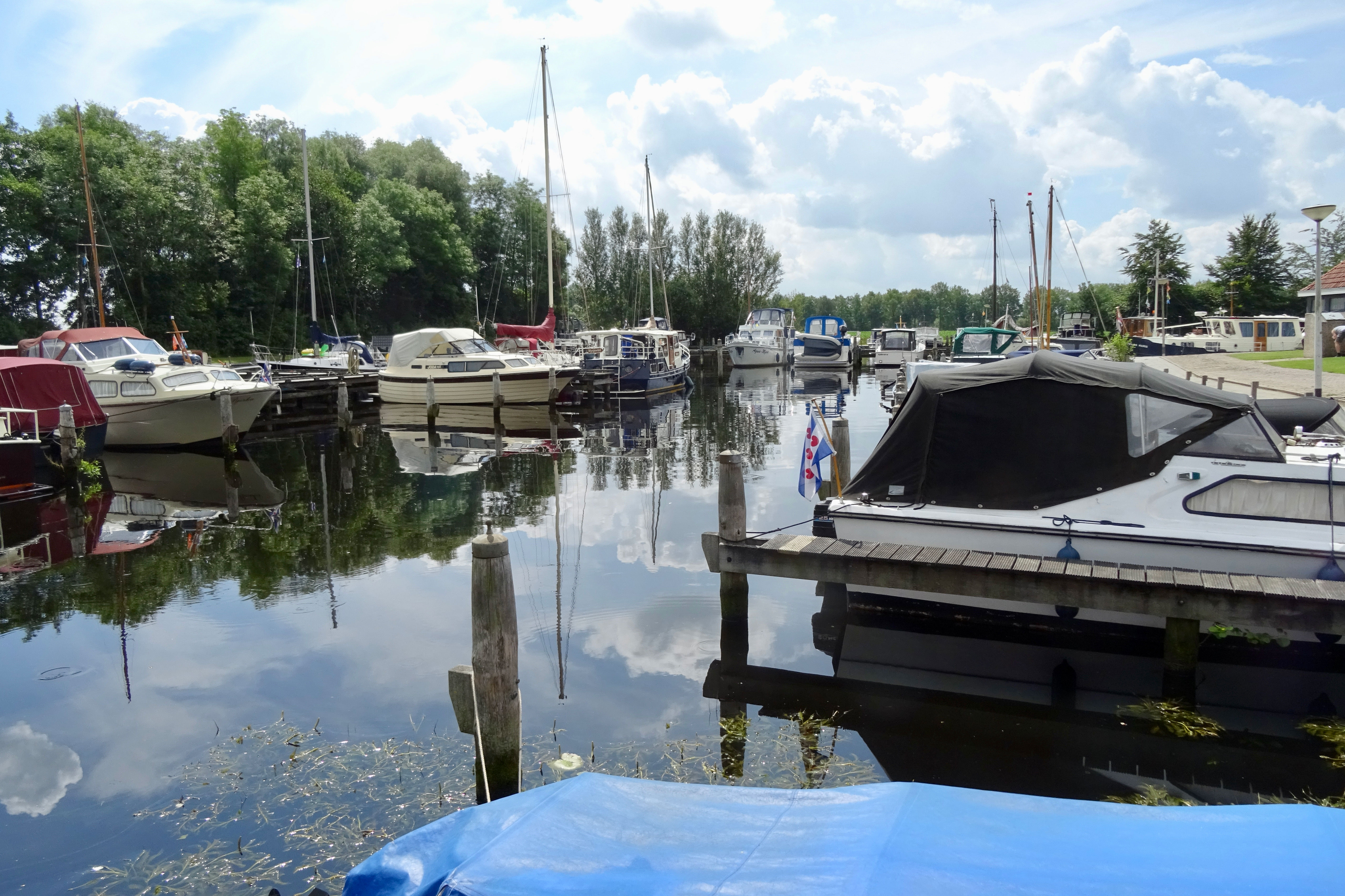
The harbour of Oudega

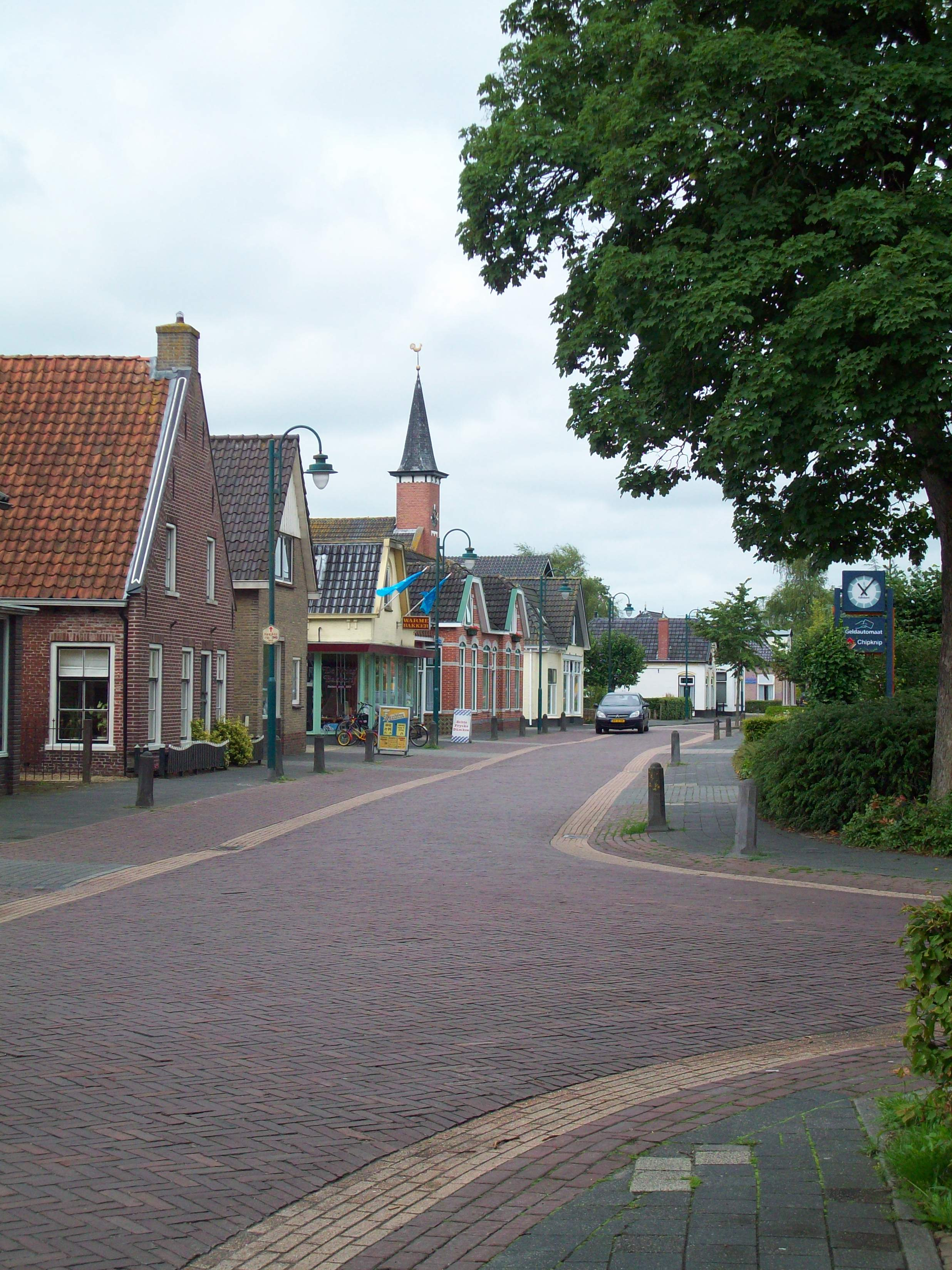
Street view

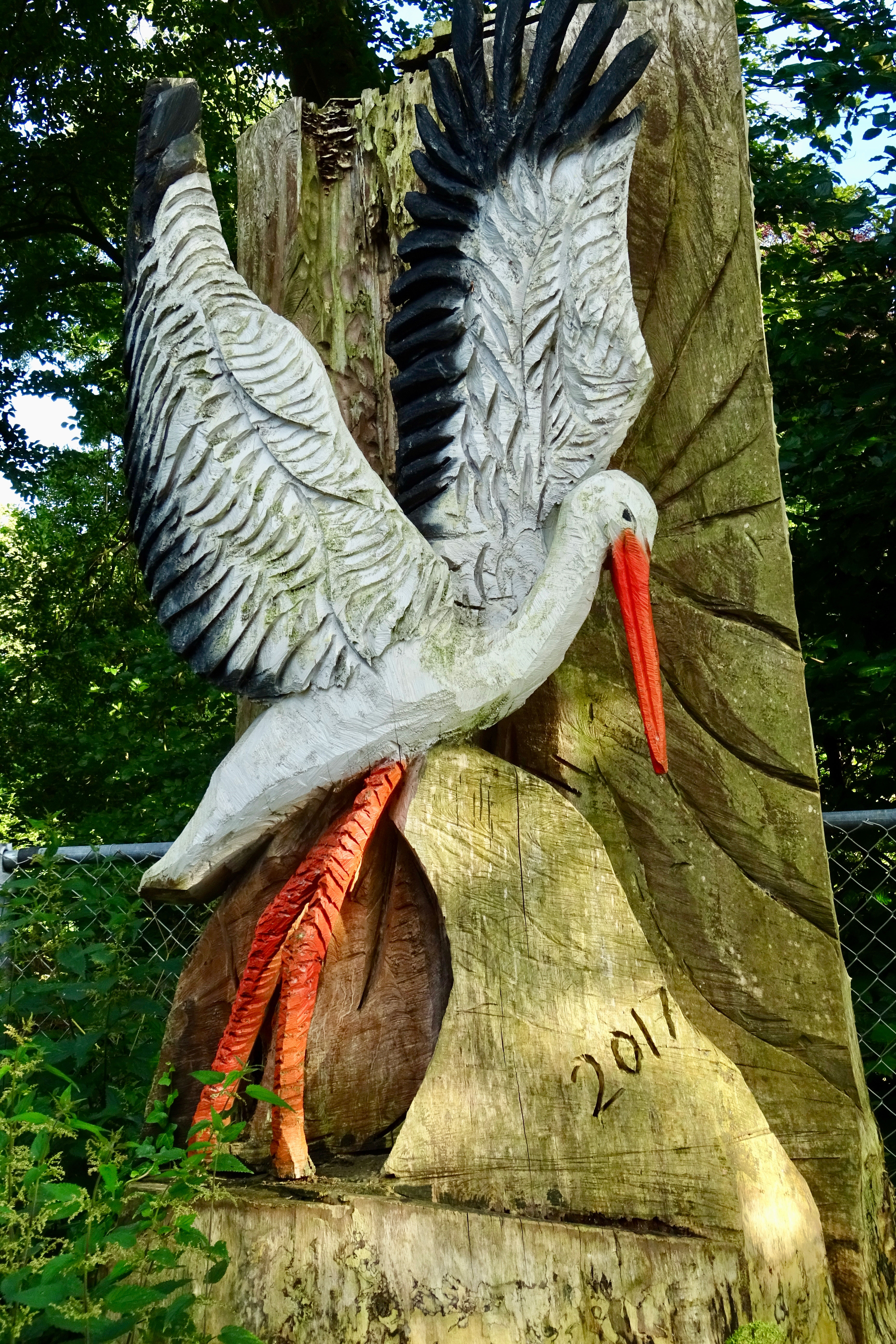
Stork Statue
