= Oudega, De Fryske Marren =

Oudega Aldegea
- Village
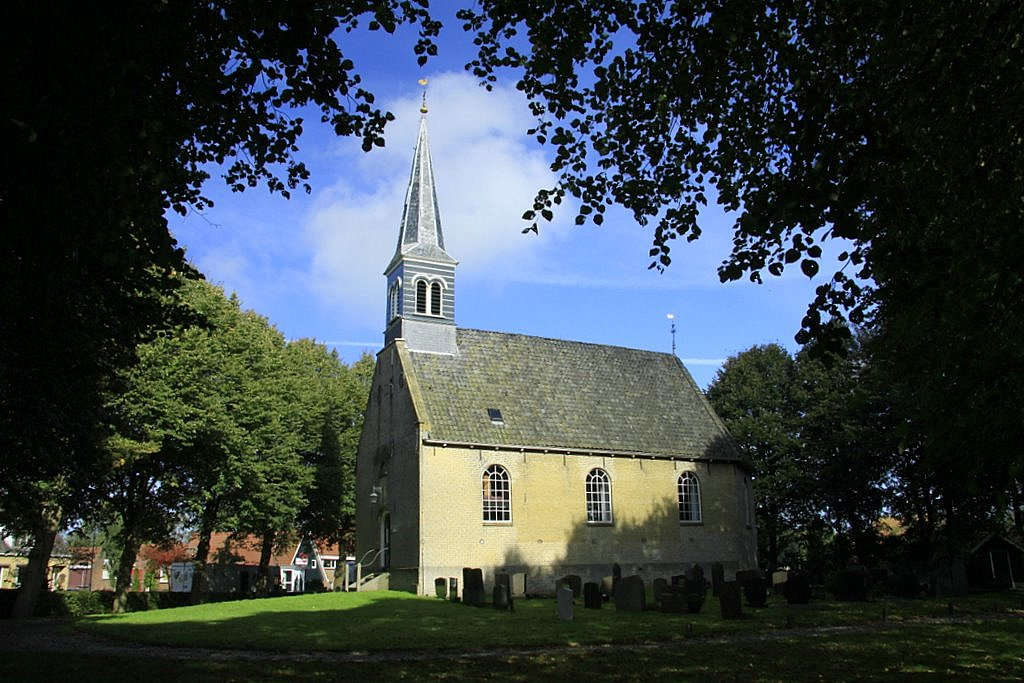
- Oudega church

- Coat of arms

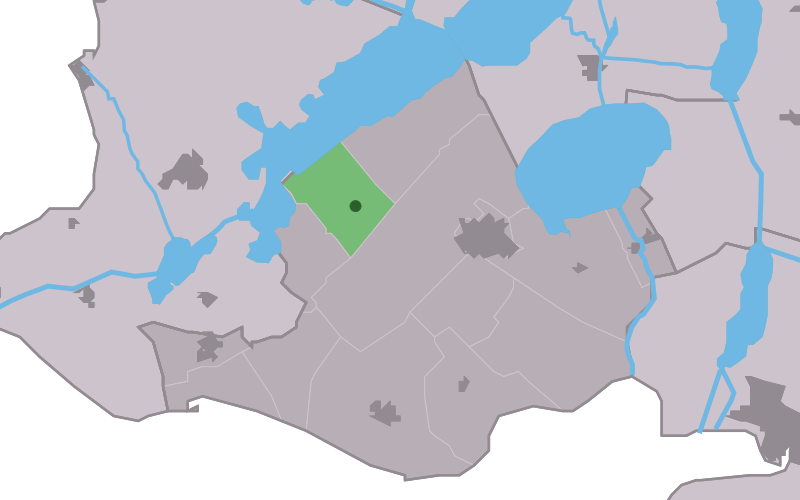
- Location in the former Gaasterlân-Sleat municipality

- Location in the Netherlands Oudega (Netherlands)
- Country: Netherlands
- Province: Friesland
- Municipality: De Fryske Marren

Area
  - Total: 6.53 km^{2} (2.52 sq mi)
- Elevation: −1.0 m (−3.3 ft)

Population (2021)
  - Total: 265
  - Density: 40.6/km^{2} (105/sq mi)
- Time zone: UTC+1 (CET)
  - Summer (DST): UTC+2 (CEST)
- Postal code: 8582
- Dialing code: 0514

Oudega (West Frisian: Aldegea) is a small village in De Fryske Marren municipality in the province of Friesland, the Netherlands. It had a population of around 265 in 2017.

== History ==
It was first mentioned in 1412 as Oldegae, and means "old village". The Dutch Reformed Church dates from 1850, and has been built on a terp (artificial living mound). In 1840, Oudega was home to 366 people.

Before 2014, Oudega was part of the Gaasterlân-Sleat municipality and before 1984 it belonged to Hemelumer Oldeferd which was named Hemelumer Oldephaert & Noordwolde (H.O.N.). before 1956.

== Gallery ==
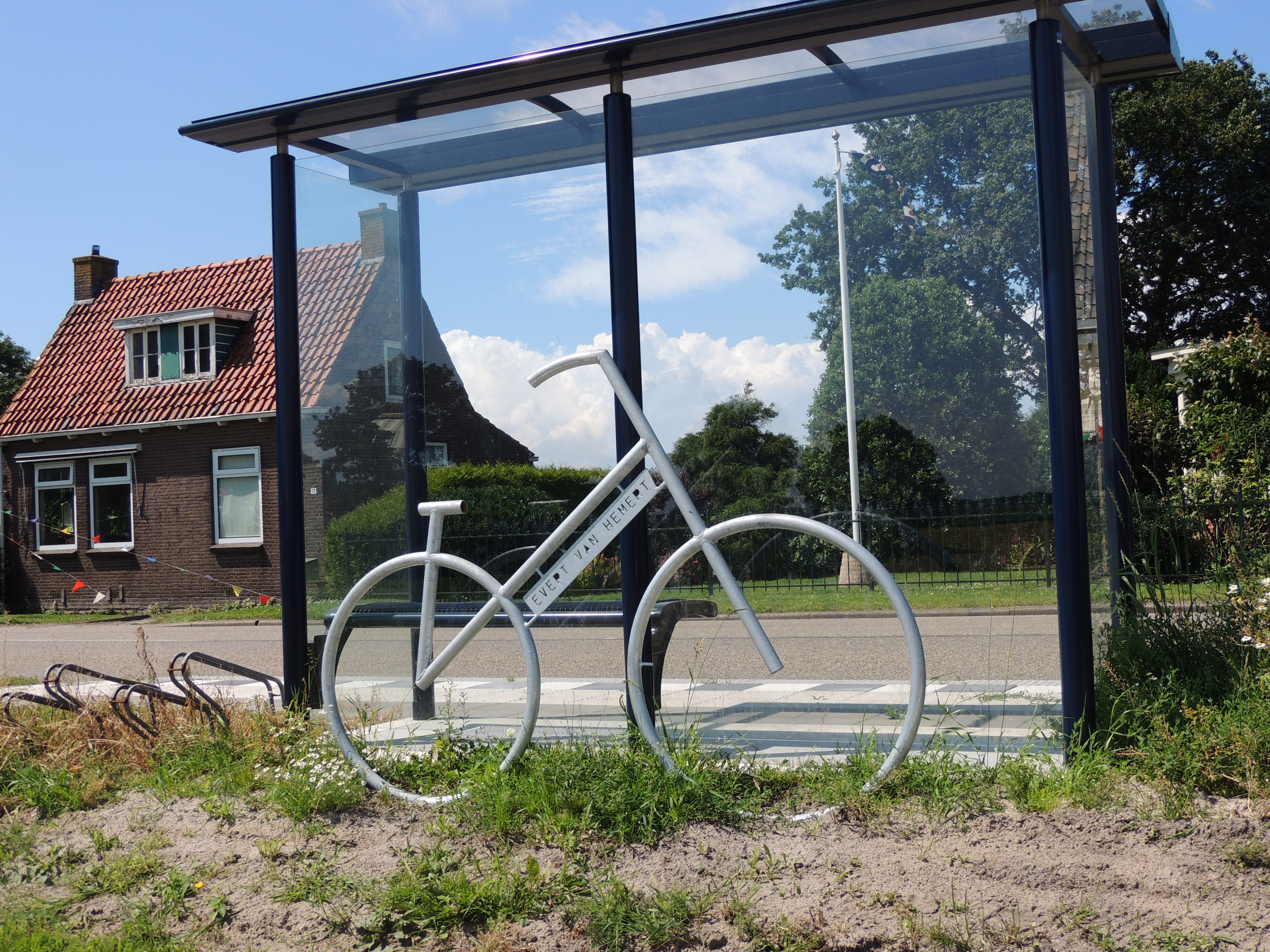
Art by Evert van Hemert

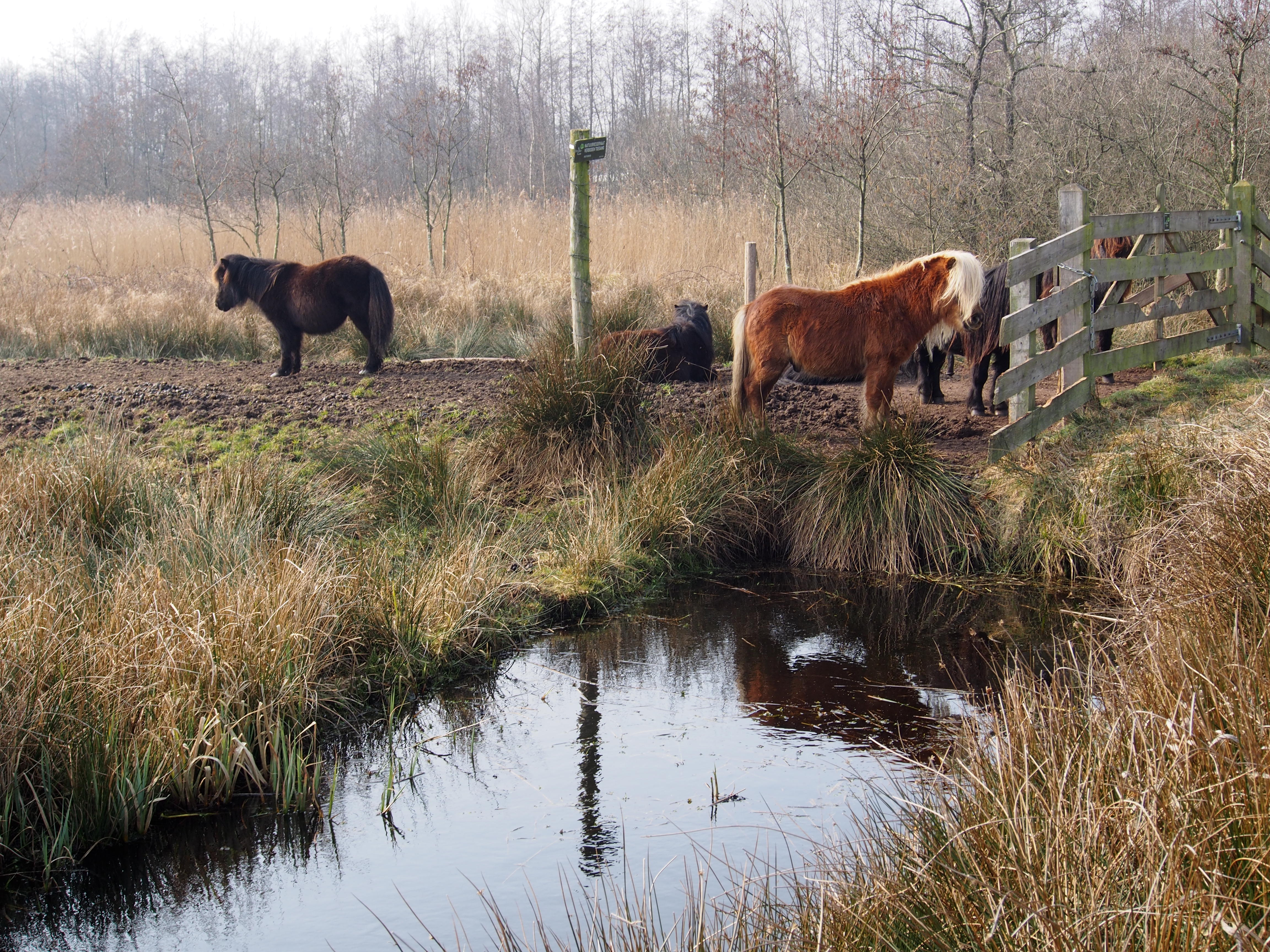
Ponies in Oudega
