= Rotstergaast =

- Village
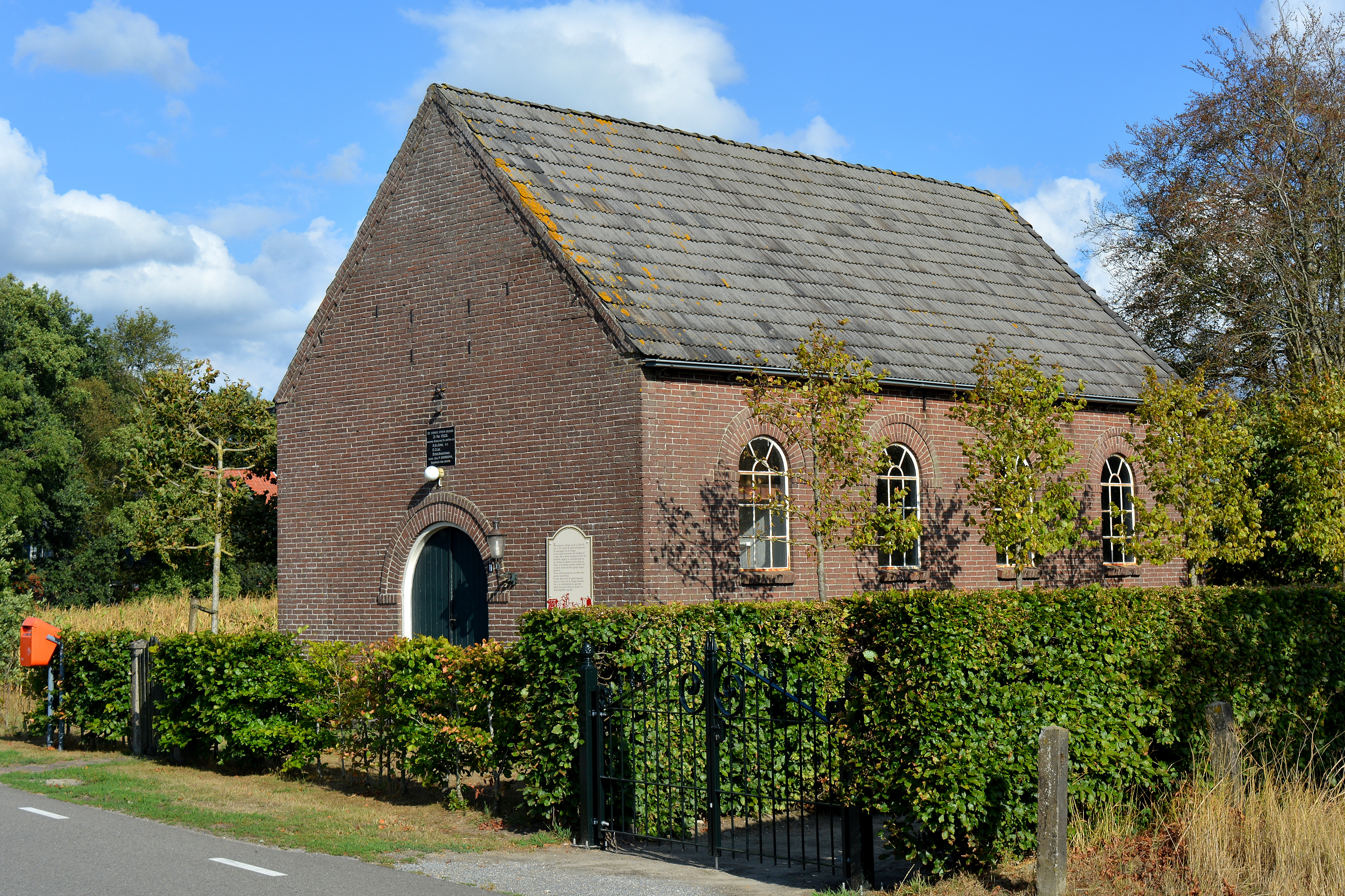
- Church of Rotstergaast

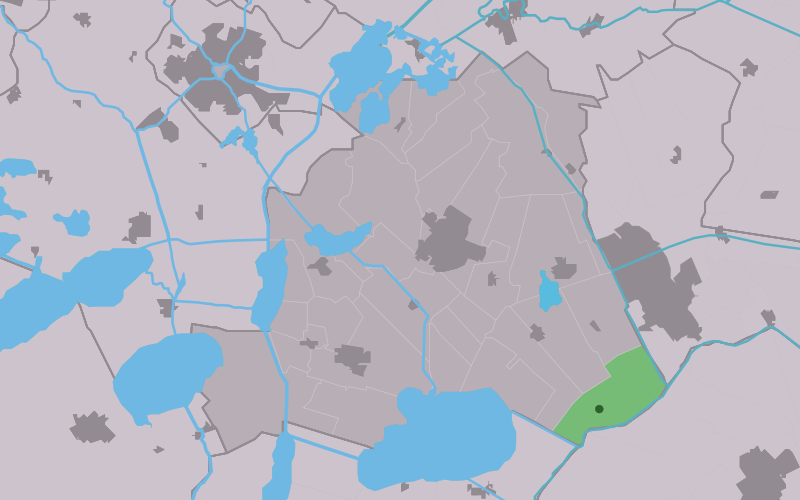
- Location in the former Skarsterlân municipality

- Location in the Netherlands Rotstergaast (Netherlands)
- Country: Netherlands
- Province: Friesland
- Municipality: De Fryske Marren

Area
  - Total: 9.93 km^{2} (3.83 sq mi)
- Elevation: 2 m (6.6 ft)

Population (2021)
  - Total: 180
  - Density: 18/km^{2} (47/sq mi)
- Time zone: UTC+1 (CET)
  - Summer (DST): UTC+2 (CEST)
- Postal code: 8462
- Dialing code: 0513

Rotstergaast is a village in Skarsterlân in De Fryske Marren municipality in the province of Friesland, the Netherlands. It had a population of around 185 in 2017.

== History ==
The village is first mentioned in 1315 as Rutnergast. It means high sandy ridge belonging to Rottum. Rotstergaast already had two chapels in 1315. One was transformed into a church, however it had become derelict by 1718 and was abandoned. In 1928, a new church was built which is now used as a village centre. In 1840, Rotstergaast was home to 60 people.

Before 2014, Rotstergaast was part of the Skarsterlân municipality and before 1984 it was part of Haskerland.

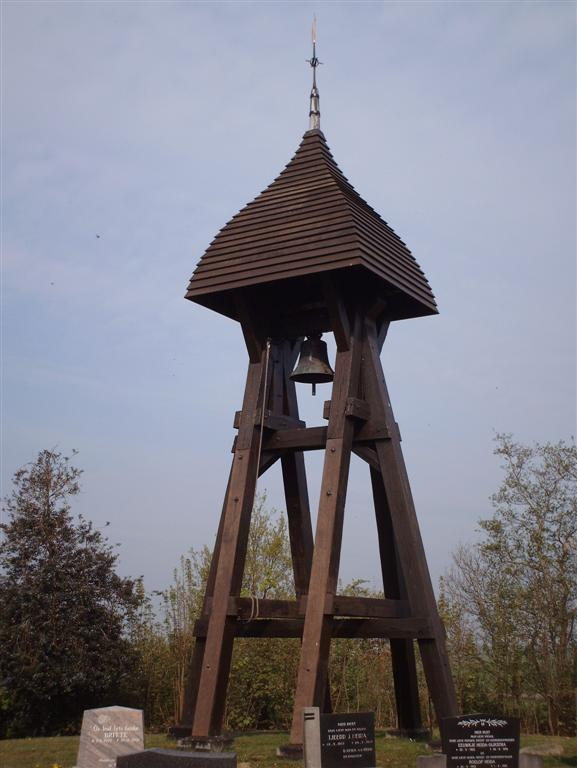
Rotstergaast bell tower
