= Haskerdijken =

Haskerdijken Haskerdiken
- Village
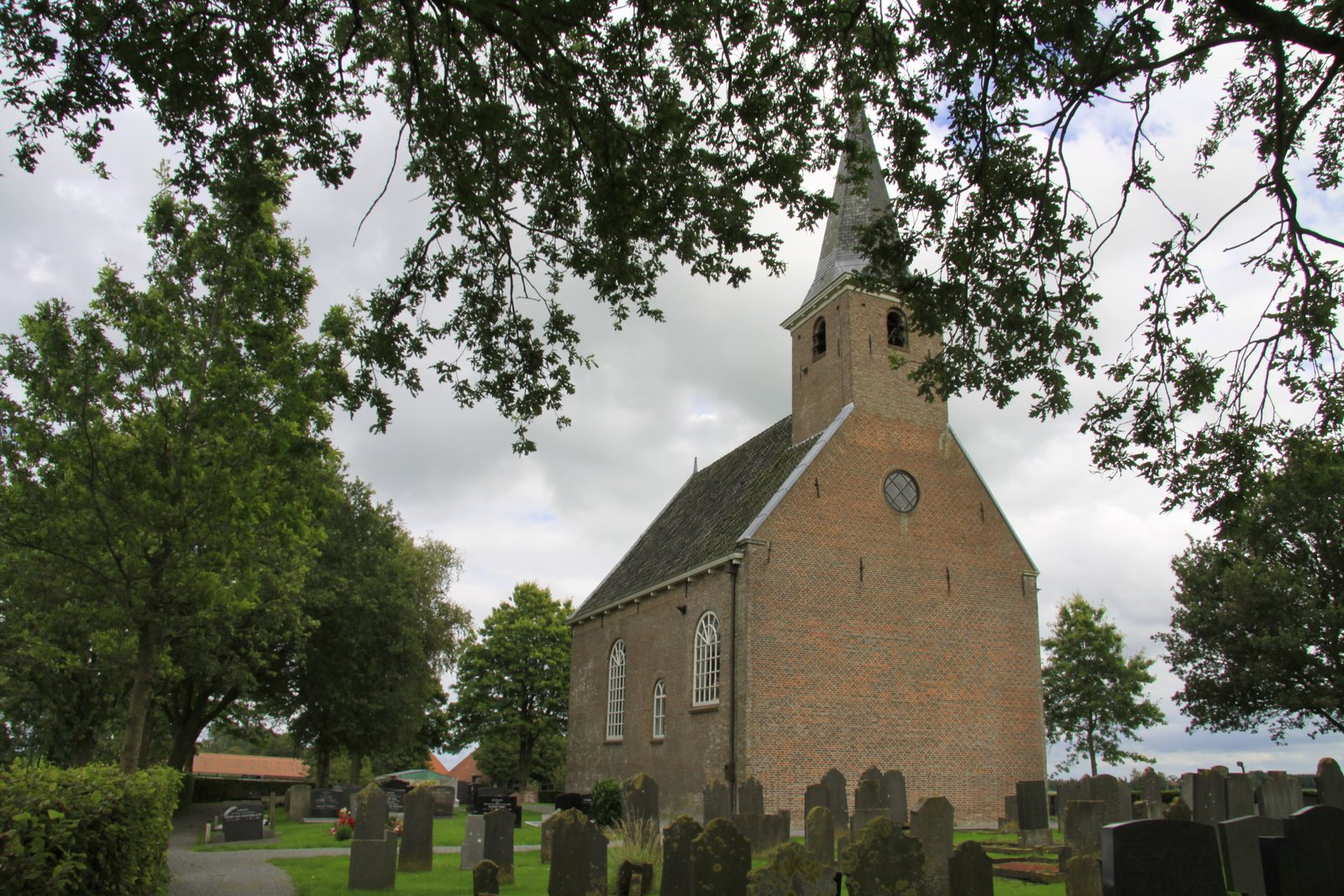
- Haskerdijken church

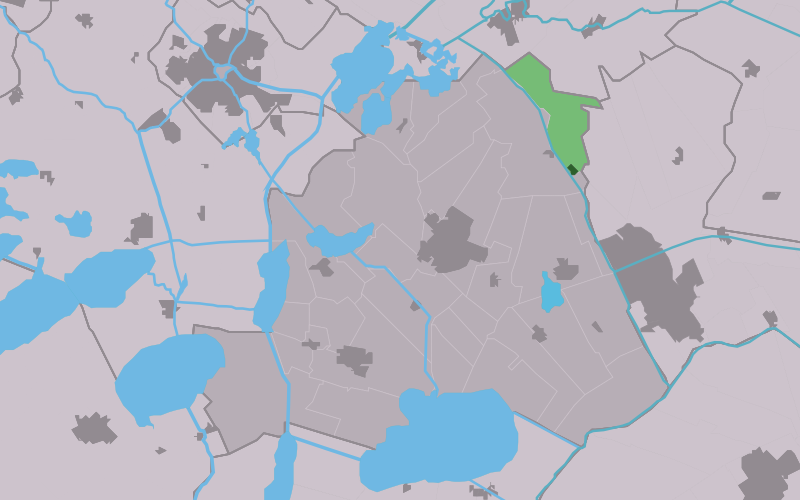
- Location in the former Skarsterlân municipality

- Location in the Netherlands Haskerdijken (Netherlands)
- Country: Netherlands
- Province: Friesland
- Municipality: Heerenveen

Area
  - Total: 7.81 km^{2} (3.02 sq mi)
- Elevation: 0.1 m (0.33 ft)

Population (2021)
  - Total: 385
  - Density: 49.3/km^{2} (128/sq mi)
- Time zone: UTC+1 (CET)
  - Summer (DST): UTC+2 (CEST)
- Postal code: 8468
- Dialing code: 0513

Haskerdijken (West Frisian: Haskerdiken) is a village in Heerenveen in the province of Friesland, the Netherlands. It has a population of around 395 in January 2017.

== History ==
The village was first mentioned in 1465 as Dijcken, and means dike belonging to Oudehaske. Haskerdijken was located near the convent of Maria Rozendal which was founded in 1235 at the spot where the monk Doda was killed in 1231 when his chapel collapsed. The convent was destroyed in 1576. In 1818, a church was built at the location of the convent. In 1840, Haskerdijk was home to 304 people.

Before 2014, Haskerdijken was part of the Skarsterlân municipality and before 1984 it was part of Haskerland.

== Gallery ==
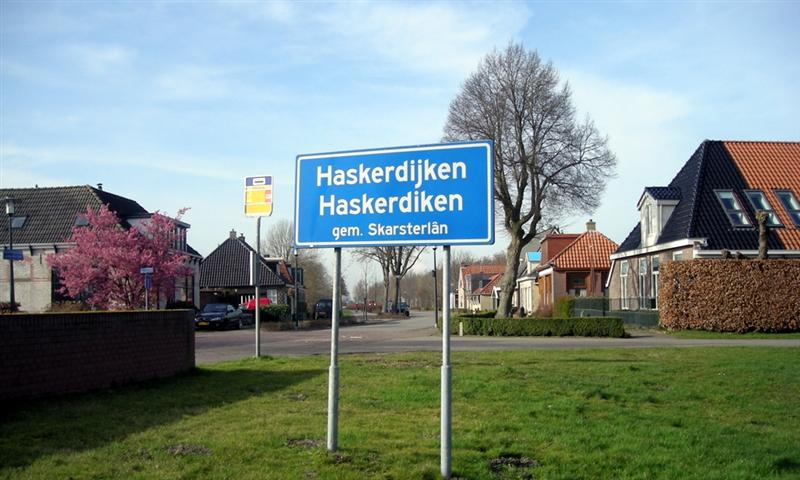
Welcome to Haskerdijken

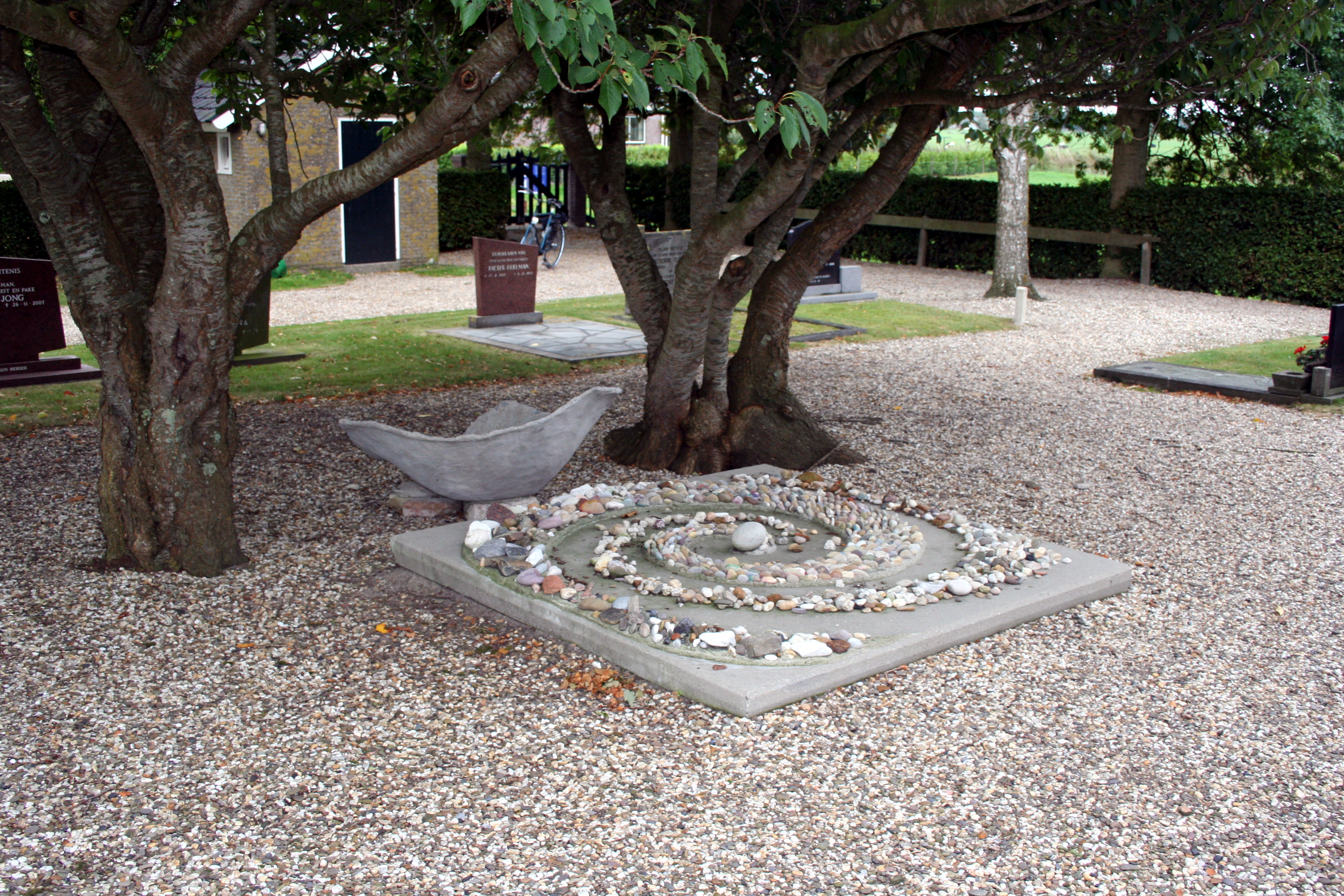
Stone monument
