= Hotels.nl =

Dutch hotel booking website

- Industry: Hotel Booking
- Founded: Groningen, Netherlands, November 2001
- Founders: Kees Eldering and Henriëtte IJzelenberg.
- Headquarters: Groningen, The Netherlands
- Number of locations: Groningen
- Area served: The Netherlands and Belgium
- Number of employees: 30
- Website: http://www.hotels.nl/

Hotels.nl, founded in 2001, is a hotel booking site for the Netherlands and Belgium. It was founded by Kees Eldering and Henriette IJzelenberg.

In April 2006, Hotels.nl launched their sheep advertising campaign. Although they were not the first to utilize sheep for advertisement, they were the first to do so in the Netherlands. The sheep were equipped with royal blue waterproof blankets with the company’s logo printed on them. The insulation on the blankets is washed in citronella, to repel parasites. Though it brought a smile, the Mayor of Skarsterlân, Bert Kuiper, fined the company 1,000 euros a day for violating the town’s ban of highway advertisement. Thanks to the sheep, in 2007, AMMA awarded Hotels.nl for having the best media stunt of the year for 2006.

In 2012, Hotels.nl partnered with Noordlease for customers to lease the VW Up, equipped with Hotels.nl’s logo on the side.

As of 2018, the website is available in Dutch, English, and German. It is affiliated with over 2000 different hotels.

Owner Kees Eldering was short member of the Dutch alt-right political party Forum for Democracy, but left the party because he found the party not democratic enough.
