= Joure =

Joure De Jouwer (West Frisian)
- Town
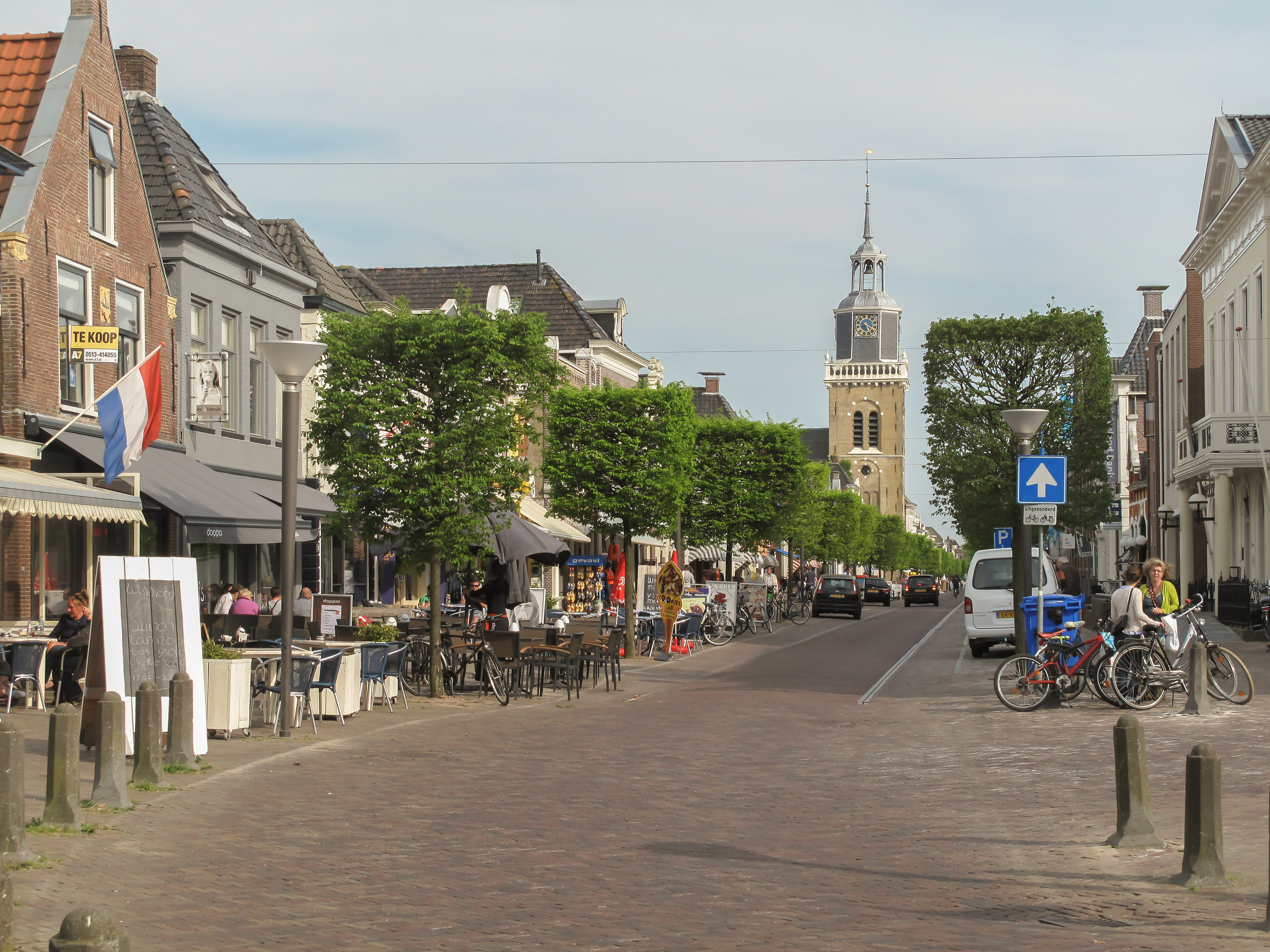
- The Midstraat and the Jouster Tour

- Coat of arms

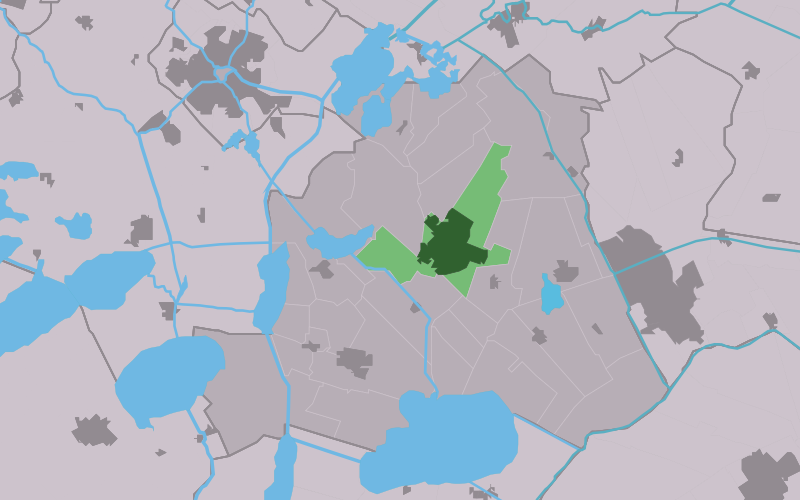
- Location in the former Skarsterlân municipality

- Location in the Netherlands
- Coordinates: 52°57′54″N 5°48′0″E
- Country: Netherlands
- Province: Friesland
- Municipality: De Fryske Marren

Population (2017)
  - Total: 13,090
- Time zone: UTC+1 (CET)
  - Summer (DST): UTC+2 (CEST)
- Postal code: 8500-8503
- Telephone area: 0513

Joure (Dutch pronunciation: [ˈjʌurə]; West Frisian: De Jouwer) is a town in the north of the Netherlands. It is the administrative center of De Fryske Marren, Friesland. With 13,090 inhabitants, it is also the most populous town in the municipality.

Residents of Joure are called Jousters; they are also commonly referred to as Jouster Keallepoaten. The Frisian keallepoat (calf's leg) refers to a baked offering, which early Jousters made to a water spirit, offering gratitude for bestowing so much water on their lands. The product consists of two elongated pastries that are baked next to and against each other and therefore resemble calf legs. They are made from rye flour, honey and various herbs.

== History ==
Joure originated partly on top of a gaast (sand ridge) and a late Medieval dike that ran from the local toll house to Haskerhorne; the later Midstraat was built on the crown of this embankment. In addition to this, Joure also lay on a crossing of waterways next to the former village of Westermeer. In the early fifteenth century, many canals were dug by traders of the Hanseatic League. They were looking for a remote place that could only be reached through canals and by trekschuit, because these places were relatively safe from the feared Northerners. Then the Kolk was also dug, from where a De Overspitting waterway to Heerenveen was dug.

During the Great Depression of the twentieth century there was a lot of activity in Joure. The peat that came from the present day lake of Nannewiid, south of Oudehaske, was transported on prams in Joure and was transferred to skûtsjes. This transfer took place at the place where the Oerdracht church now stands.

Some street names, such as Eeltsjebaes, Aukebaes and Hettebaes, still recall the shipyards, where new skûtsjes and prams were made, but many repairs were also made. Before World War II, Joure was part of an extensive horse-drawn tram network. Joure was connected with Sneek, Lemmer and Heerenveen. The Stationsstraat is a street name from that era. Before the construction of these rails, roads had to be built of which the Tramwei street is a reminder. Before then, people were used to doing all transport by boat.

Joure is traditionally not a city, but also too big to be called a village. According to Old Frisian tradition, such a place is called a vlecke.

There are different theories about the origin of the name Joure or De Jouwer. It is often thought that it comes from the Frisian word Hjouwer, which refers to oats.

Joure is also inextricably linked to that of Douwe Egberts (DE). In 1753, Douwe Egberts' father, Egbert Douwes, started a colonial merchandise business on the Midstraat in Joure, which has become the well-known coffee roaster. For years, there was another DE store on the Midstraat. It was closed on 24 October 2014.

Until the municipal reorganization of 1984, Joure was the administrative center of the former municipality of Haskerland and then until 2014 of the former municipality of Skarsterlân. Joure then became part of the municipality of De Fryske Marren.

The Haulster forests lie east of Joure. De Haskerveenpolder is located north of Joure. The Langweerderwielen is a lake located west of Joure. Joure has a public subtropical swimming pool, marina, a historic town center, and water-rich residential areas.

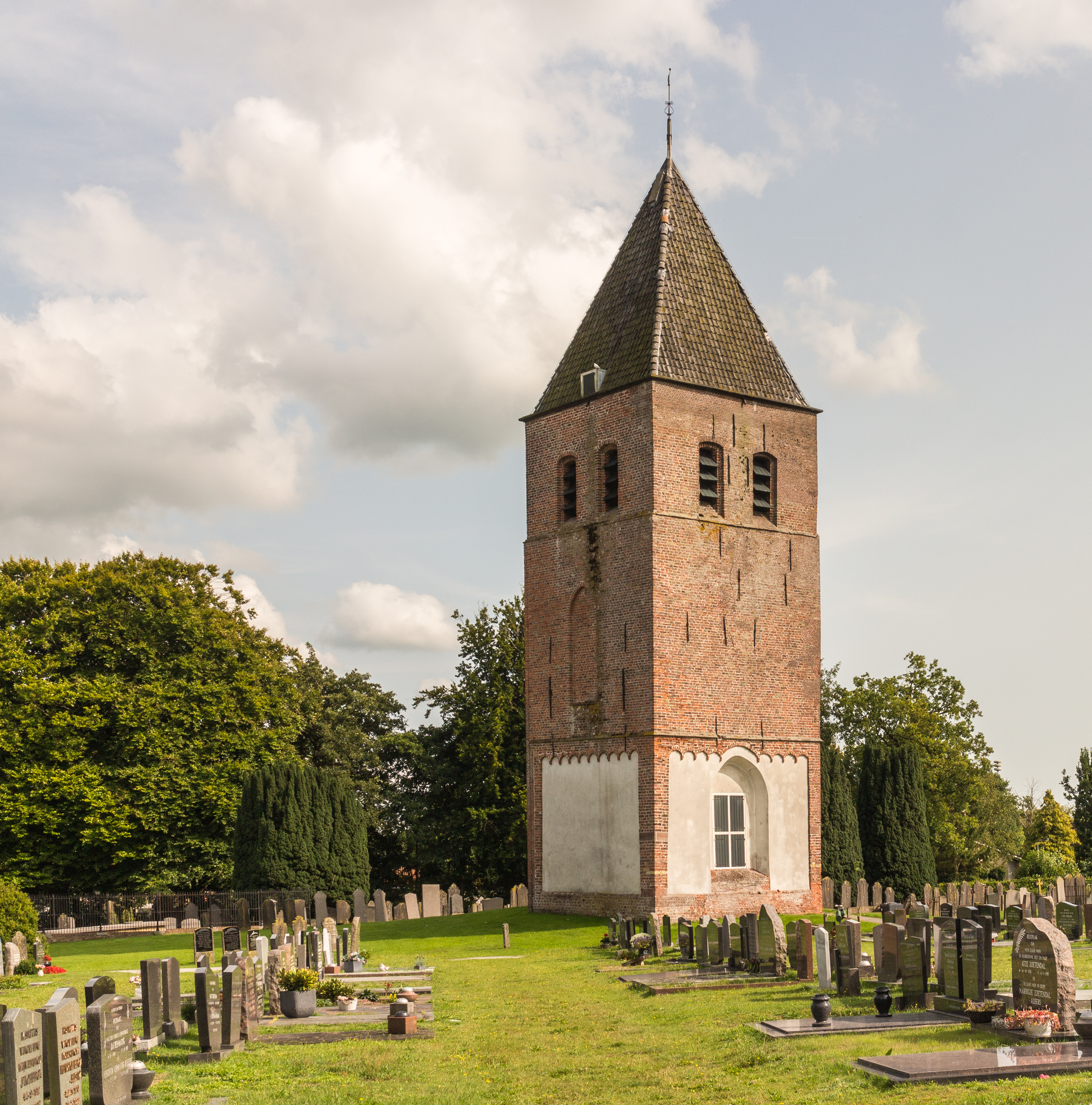
Tower of the former Westermeer church

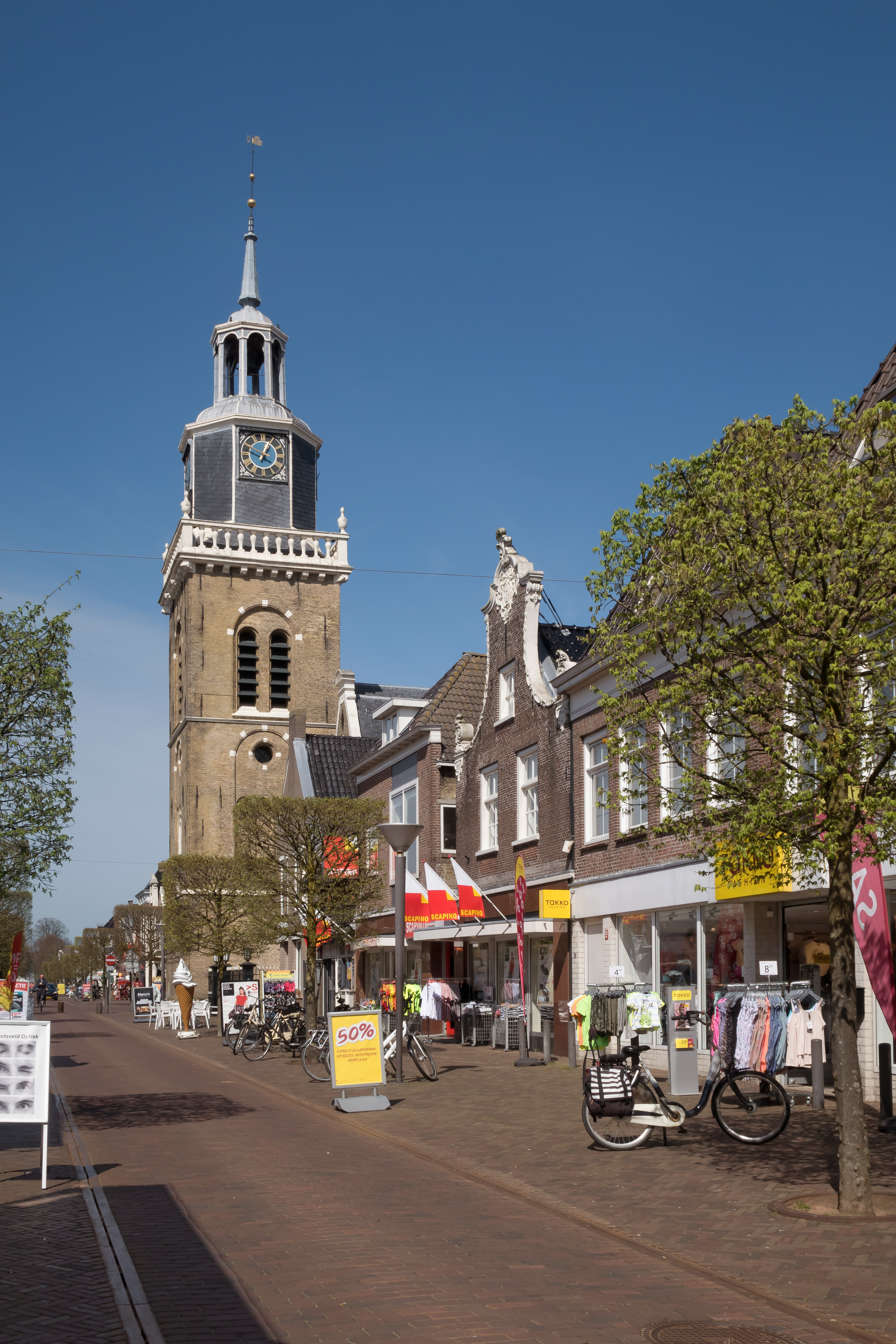
Hobbe van Baerdt church, or Jouster Tour

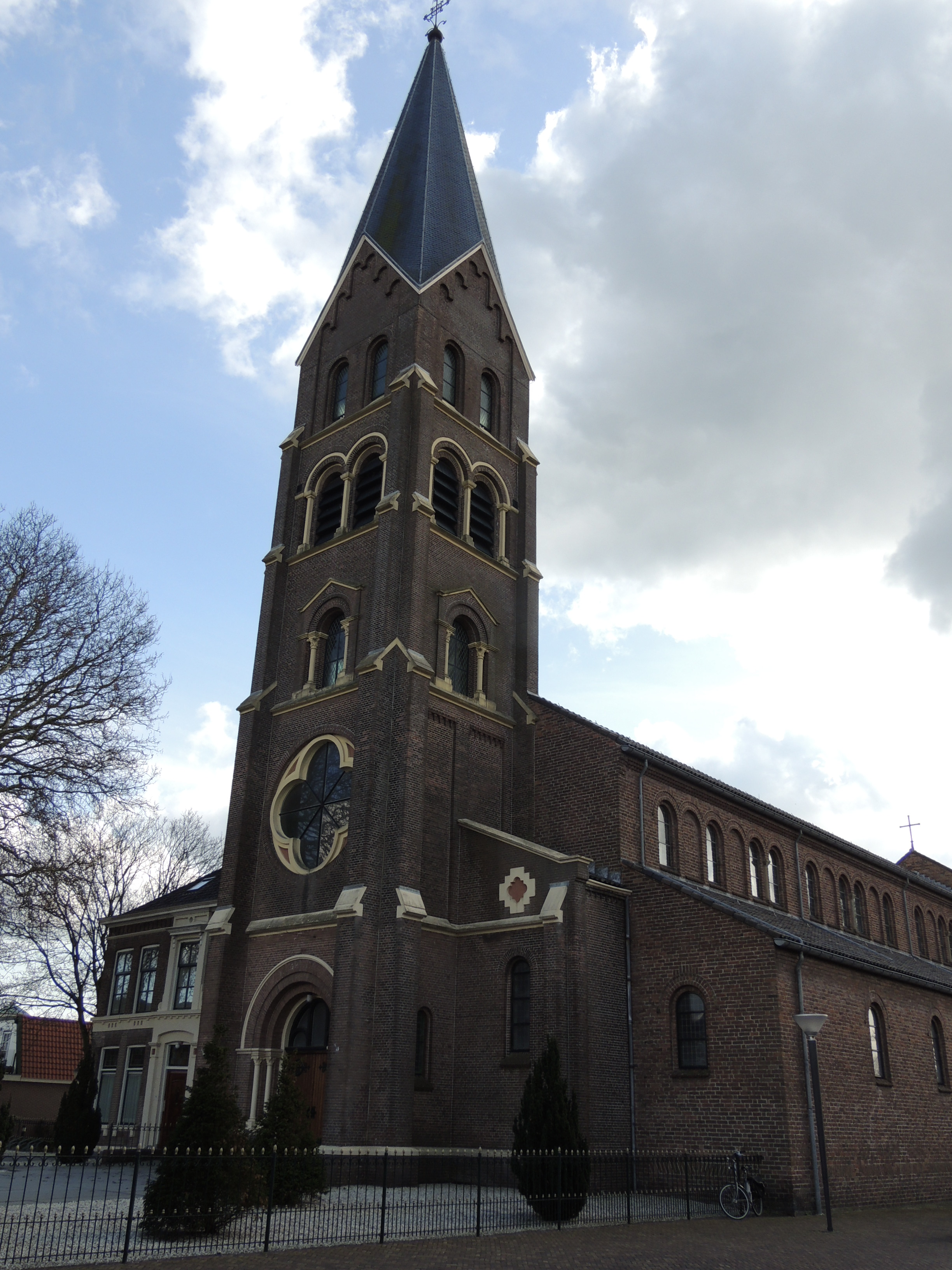
Saint Matthew church

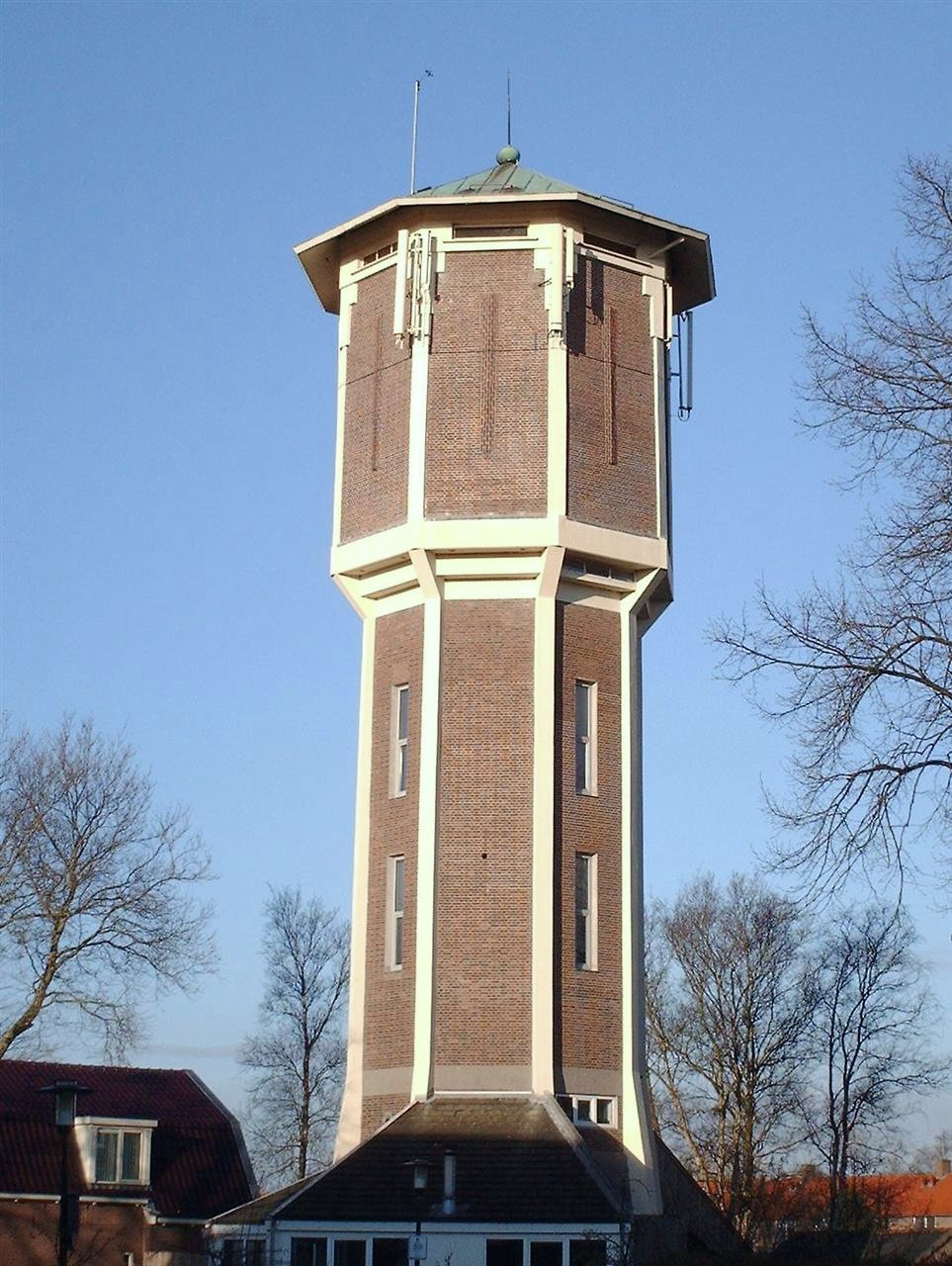
Water tower of Joure

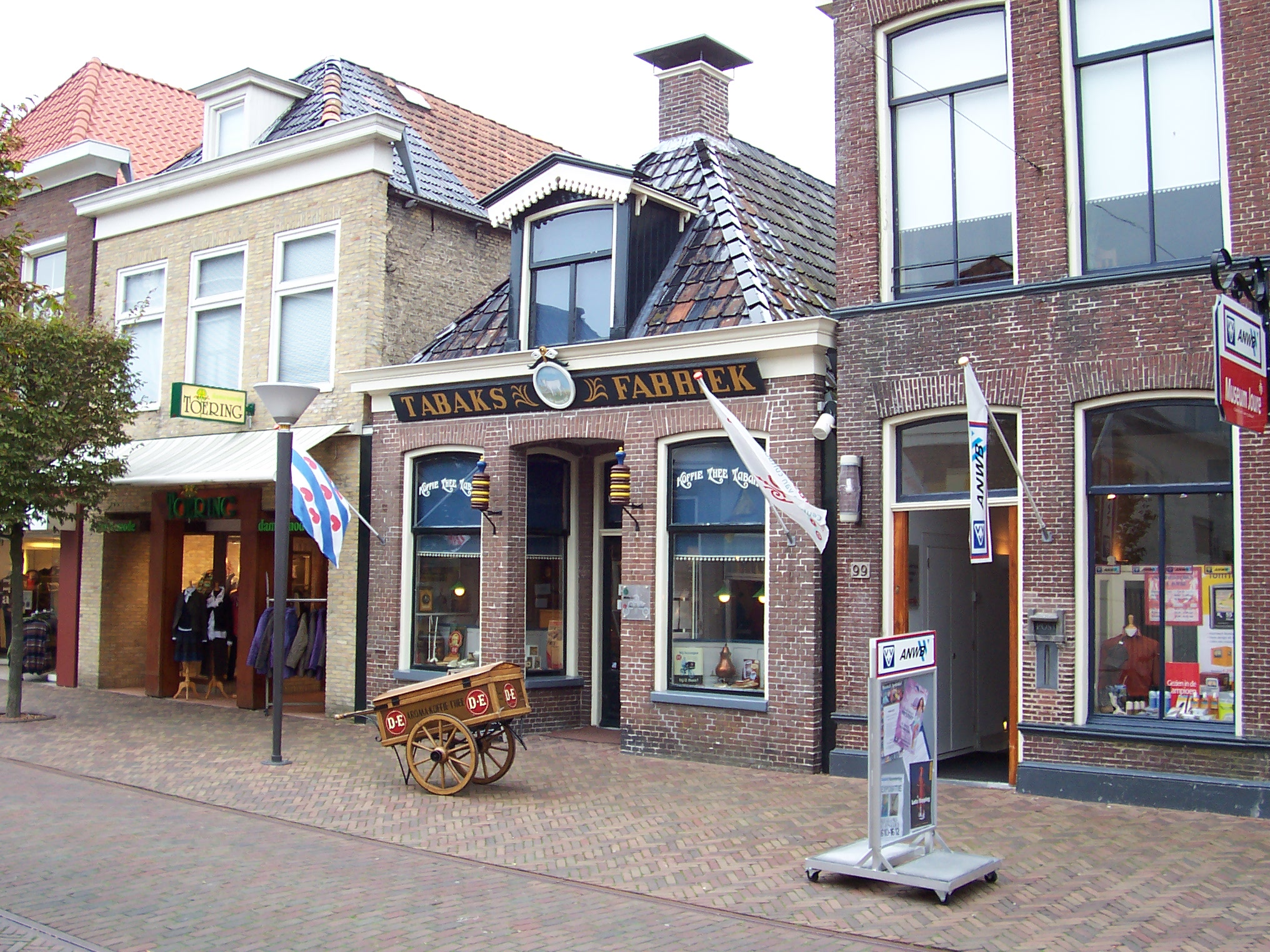
Former store of Egbert Douwes, now part of Museum Joure

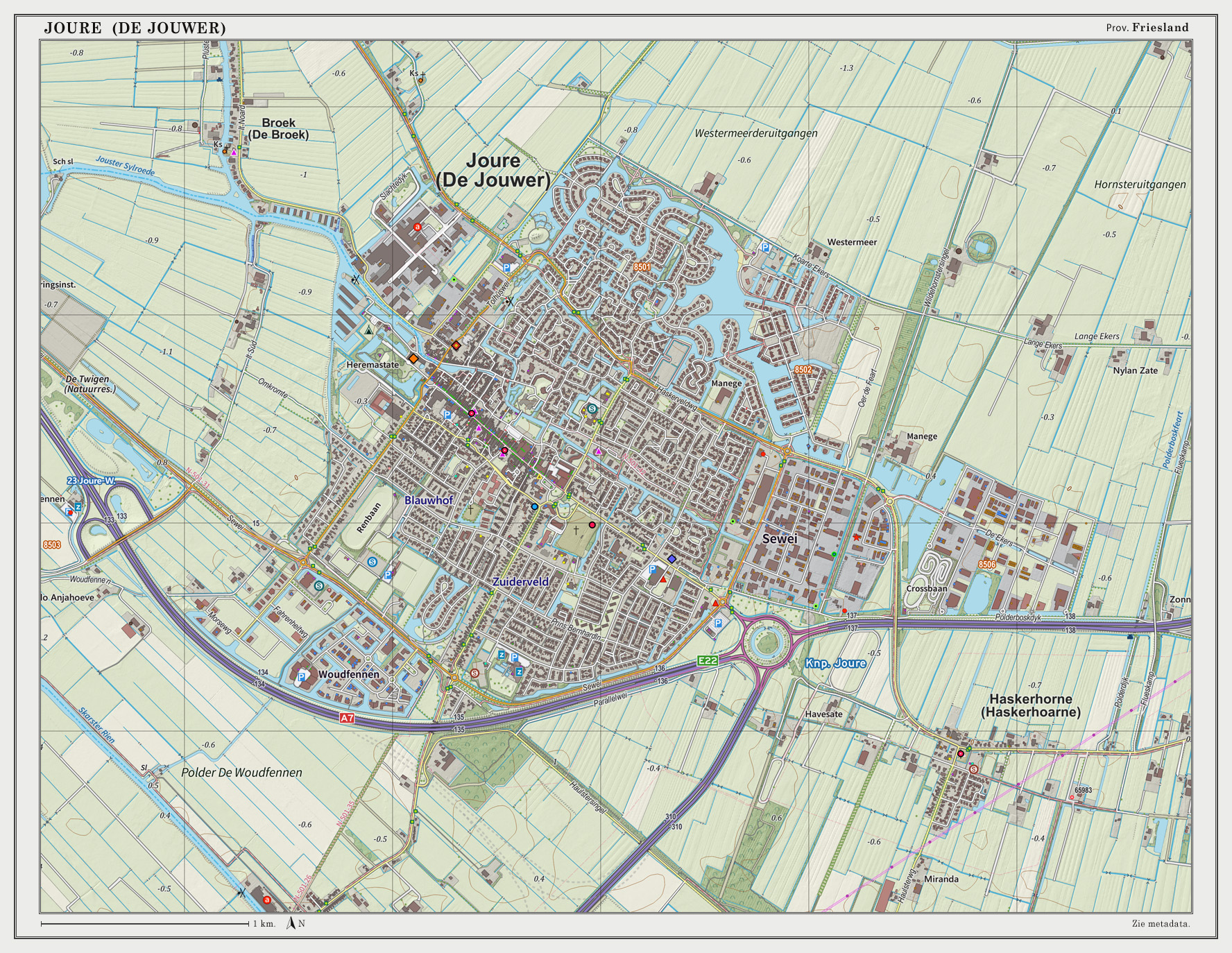
Topographic map of Joure, June 2014

== Economy ==
The town has been renowned since the 18th century for the manufacture of traditional Frisian clocks ('stoelklokken' and 'staartklokken'). This was pure home-industry aided by the presence of a local copper-melting facility. As of today, a handful of skilled tradesmen continue to manufacture these clocks.

In 1753 Egbert Douwes founded a company selling colonial goods in Joure. Starting in a small store, this venture really began to evolve as an industrial giant during the 1930-1950s. Family heirs renamed the company to Douwe Egberts and made it a world imperium, mainly focusing on coffee, tea and tobacco. As of today, many people in this town still have jobs at or related to DE, even though its headquarters moved to the city of Utrecht decades ago. Further typical industries that helped Joure grow are those related to the furniture and graphic sectors.

=== Tourism ===
Tourism has always been important and Joure offers a wide variety of uniquely typical Frisian attractions of historical, cultural and recreational significance. Its central location as well its sound transportation system make a visit to "De Flecke" easy and memorable.

== Windmills ==
There are two restored windmills in Joure, De Groene Molen and Penninga's Molen. The base of a third mill, Wielinga-stam also survives.

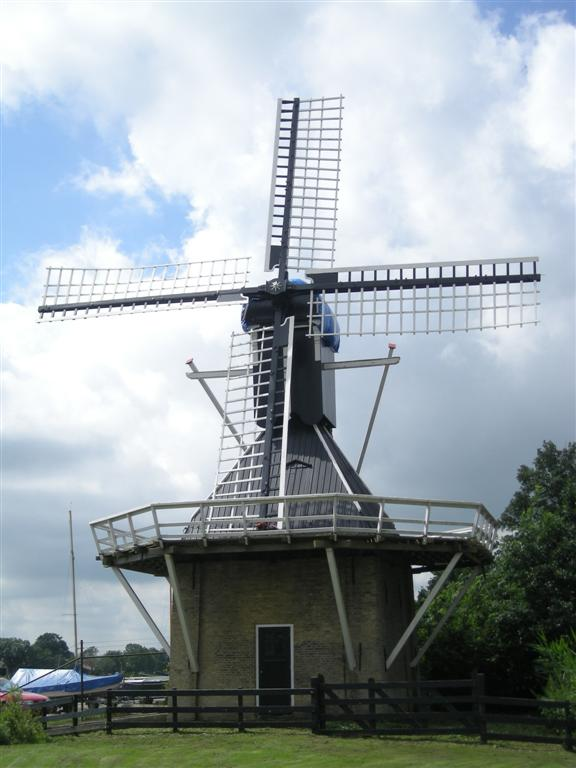
De Groene Molen

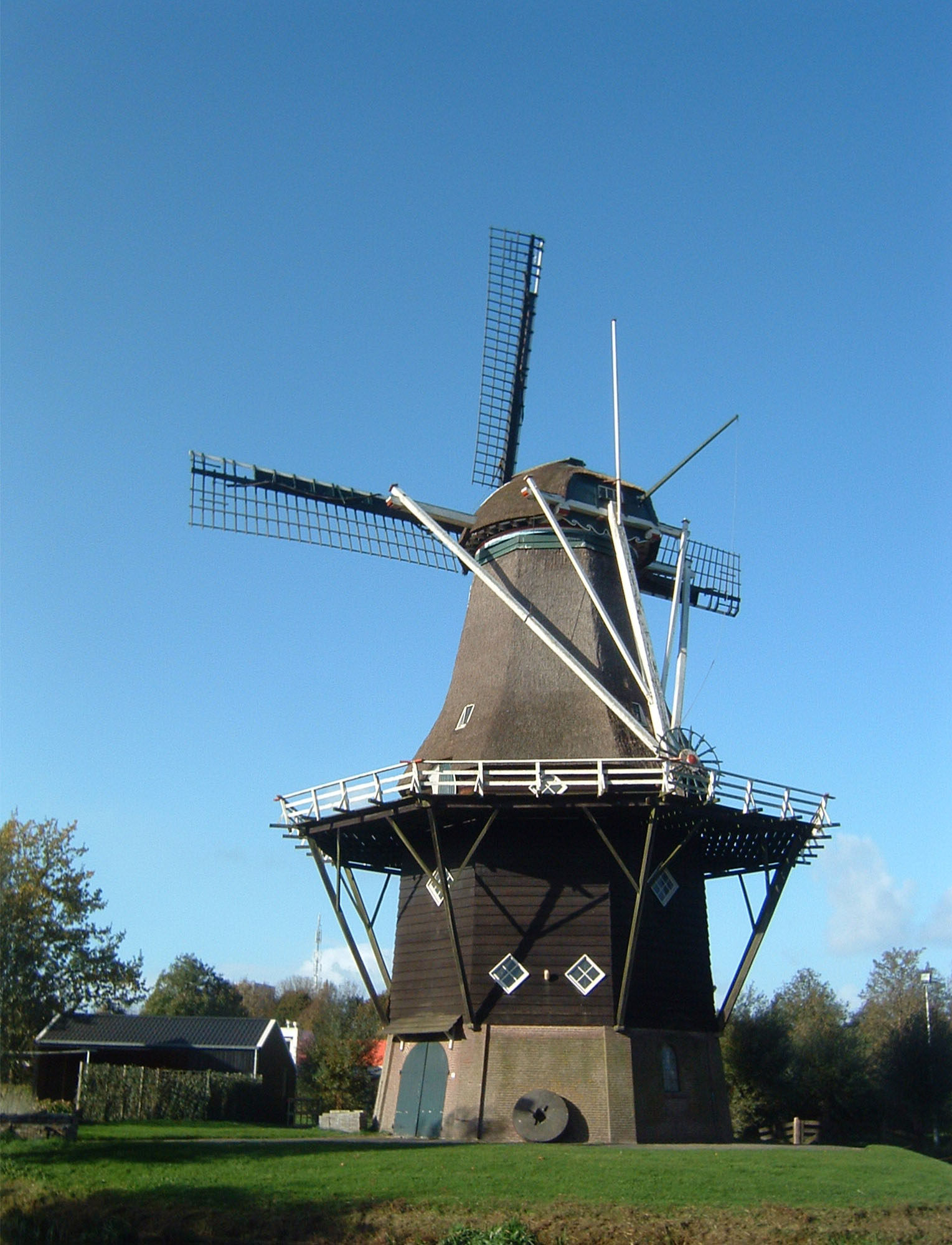
Penninga's Molen

== Notable people ==
- Egbert Douwes (1723–1802), founder of Jacobs Douwe Egberts
- Wynoldus Munniks (1744–1806), professor in medicine
- Frans Julius Johan van Eysinga (1752–1828), grietman of Doniawerstal
- Elias Annes Borger (1784–1820), professor in theology and the arts
- Geart Aeilco Wumkes (1869–1954), theologian and historian
- Nicolas Japikse (1872–1944), historian
- Jacob Jongbloed (1895–1974), physiologist
- Heije Schaper (1906–1996), military officer and politician
- Charles Groenhuijsen (born 1954), journalist and publicist
- Arend Glas (born 1968), bobsledder
- Bert Jan van der Veen (born 1968), speed skater
- Jelle ten Rouwelaar (born 1980), football player and coach
- Danny Noppert (born 1990), darts player
- Roelof ten Napel (born 1993), poet and writer
- Andries Noppert (born 1994), football player

== International relations ==
=== Twin towns — sister cities ===
Joure is twinned with:

- Drolshagen, Germany
- Mediaș, Romania
