= Haskerhorne =

Haskerhorne Haskerhoarne
- Village
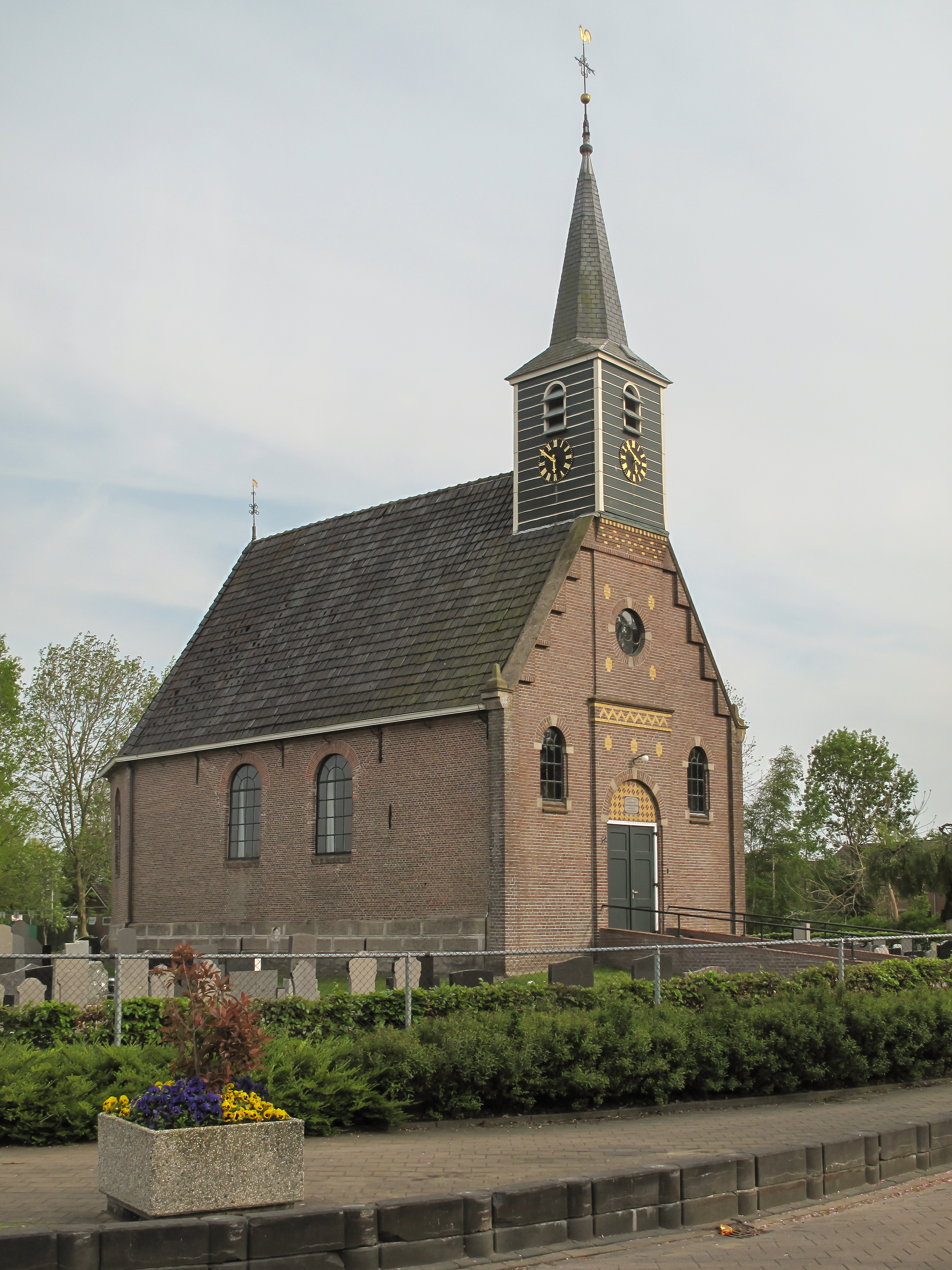
- Haskerhorne church

- Flag Coat of arms

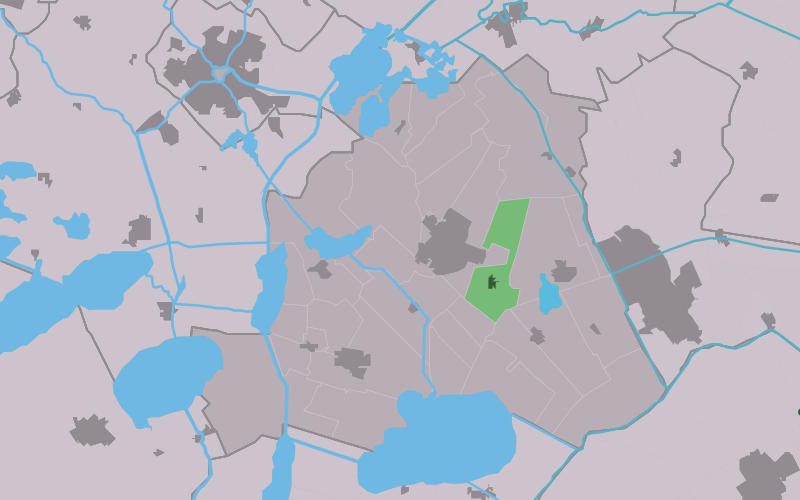
- Location in the former Skarsterlân municipality

- Location in the Netherlands Haskerhorne (Netherlands)
- Country: Netherlands
- Province: Friesland
- Municipality: De Fryske Marren

Area
  - Total: 7.14 km^{2} (2.76 sq mi)
- Elevation: 0.0 m (0 ft)

Population (2021)
  - Total: 555
  - Density: 77.7/km^{2} (201/sq mi)
- Time zone: UTC+1 (CET)
  - Summer (DST): UTC+2 (CEST)
- Postal code: 8506
- Dialing code: 0513

Haskerhorne (West Frisian: Haskerhoarne) is a village in De Fryske Marren municipality in the province of Friesland, the Netherlands. It had a population of around 565 in 2017.

== History ==
The village was first mentioned in 1333 as Hascherahorna, which means the bend/corner near Oudehaske. In 1523, the Protestant Church was destroyed by Burgundian soldiers. In 1691, the church was replaced, and in 1915 replaced again. In 1840, it was home to 139 people.

Before 2014, Haskerhorne was part of the Skarsterlân municipality and before 1984 it was part of Haskerland.
