= Sintjohannesga =

Sintjohannesga Sint Jânsgea
- Village
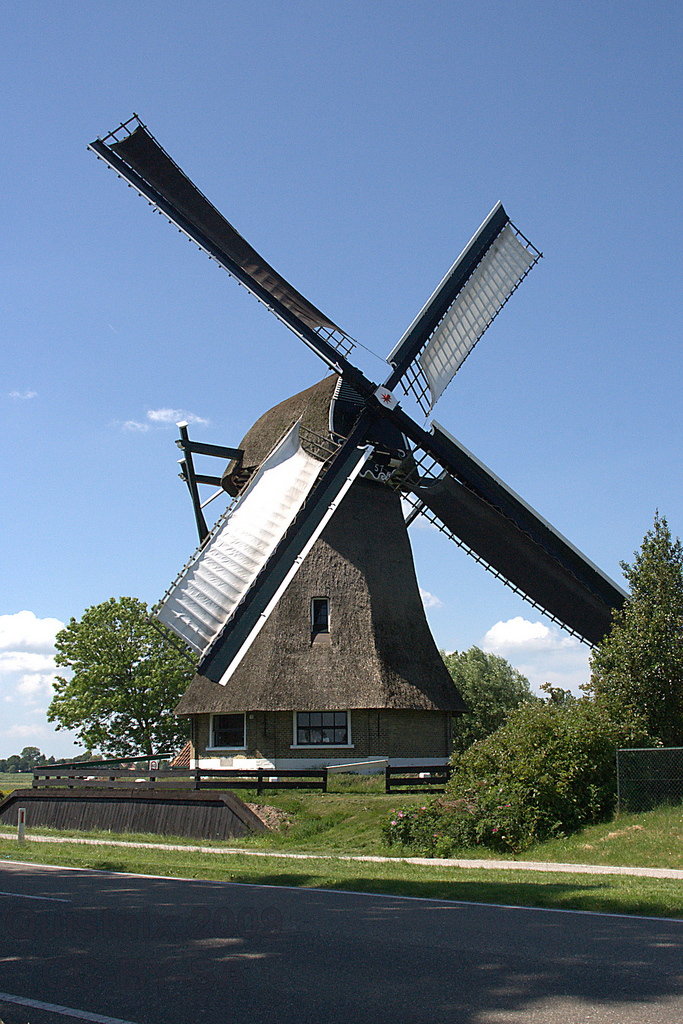
- De Hersteller Windmill

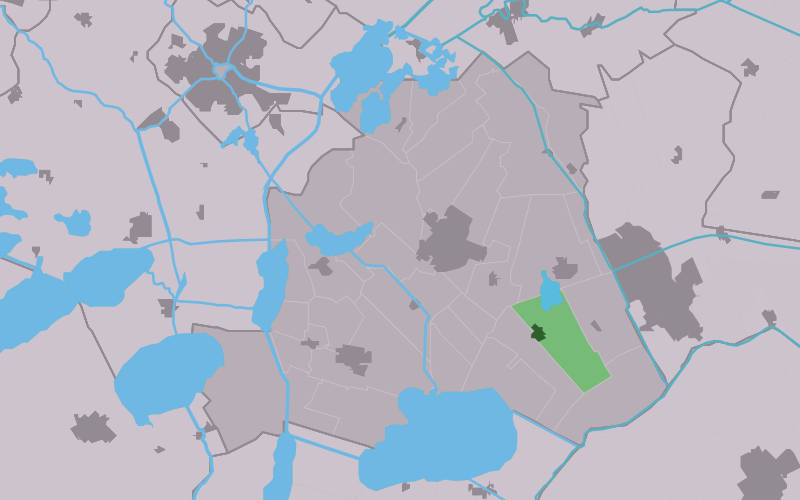
- Location in the former Skarsterlân municipality

- Location in the Netherlands Sintjohannesga (Netherlands)
- Country: Netherlands
- Province: Friesland
- Municipality: De Fryske Marren

Area
  - Total: 6.85 km^{2} (2.64 sq mi)
- Elevation: 0.1 m (0.33 ft)

Population (2021)
  - Total: 1,270
  - Density: 185/km^{2} (480/sq mi)
- Time zone: UTC+1 (CET)
  - Summer (DST): UTC+2 (CEST)
- Postal code: 8464
- Dialing code: 0513

Sintjohannesga (West Frisian: Sint Jânsgea) is a village in De Fryske Marren municipality in the province of Friesland, the Netherlands. It had a population of around 1280 in 2017.

There is a windmill in the village, De Hersteller.

== History ==
The village was first mentioned in 1408 as Sint Jansga, and has been named after John the Baptist. Sintjohannesga is a road village which developed due to the peat excavation in the area. It has grown attached to Rotsterhaule. The church was built in 1864, but burnt down in 1963 and was replaced. In 1840, Sintjohannesga was home to 348 people.

The windmill De Hersteller is a polder mill from 1857. It was constructed to drain the Veenpolder of excess water with three other mill, but is the only one remaining. In 1930, it became obsolete after an electric pumping station was built. The windmill was restored between 1979 and 1981, and nowadays generates electricity.

Before 2014, Sintjohannesga was part of the Skarsterlân municipality and before 1984 it was part of Haskerland. Before 1934, Sintjohannesga was part of the Schoterland municipality.

== Gallery ==
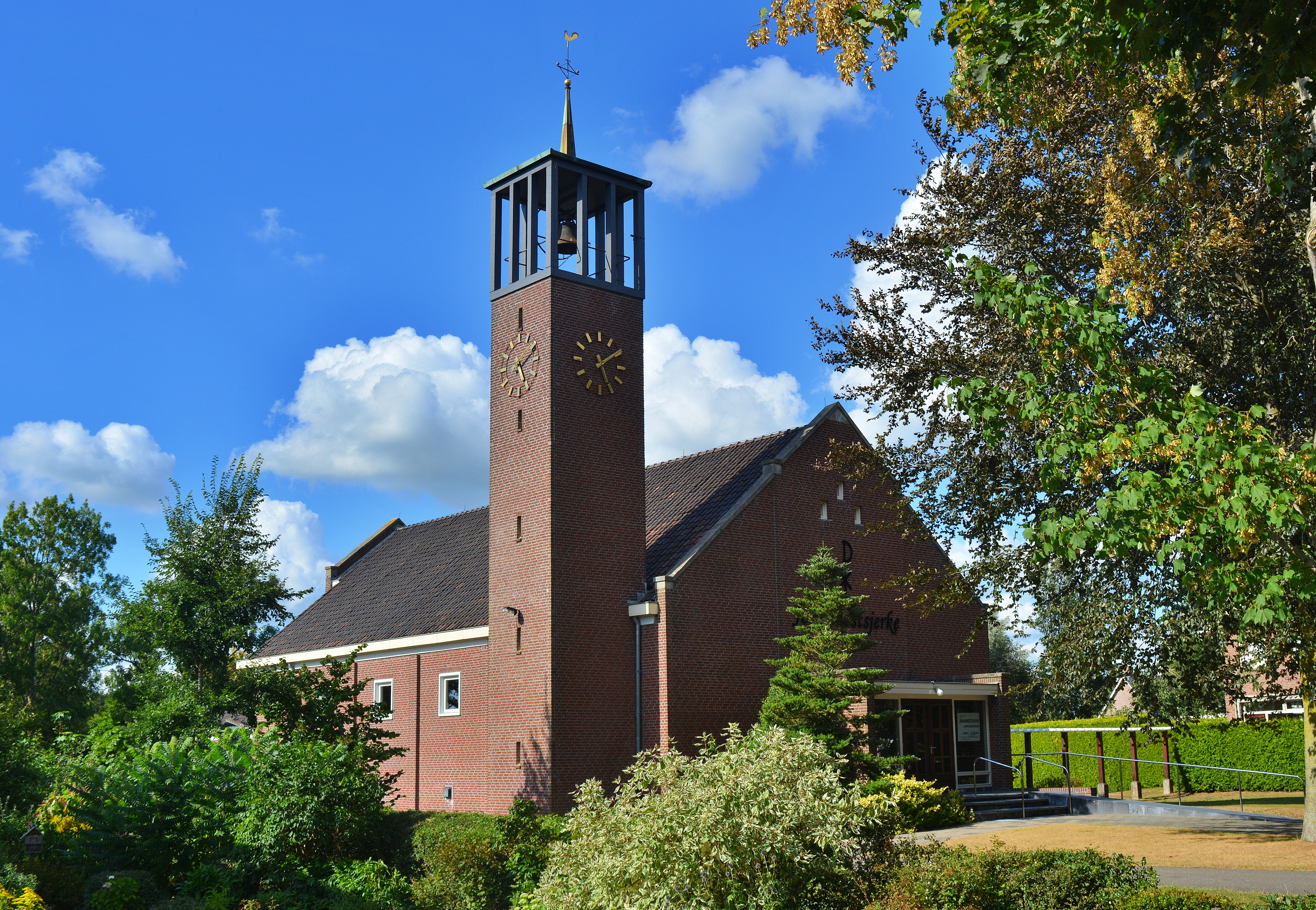
Church

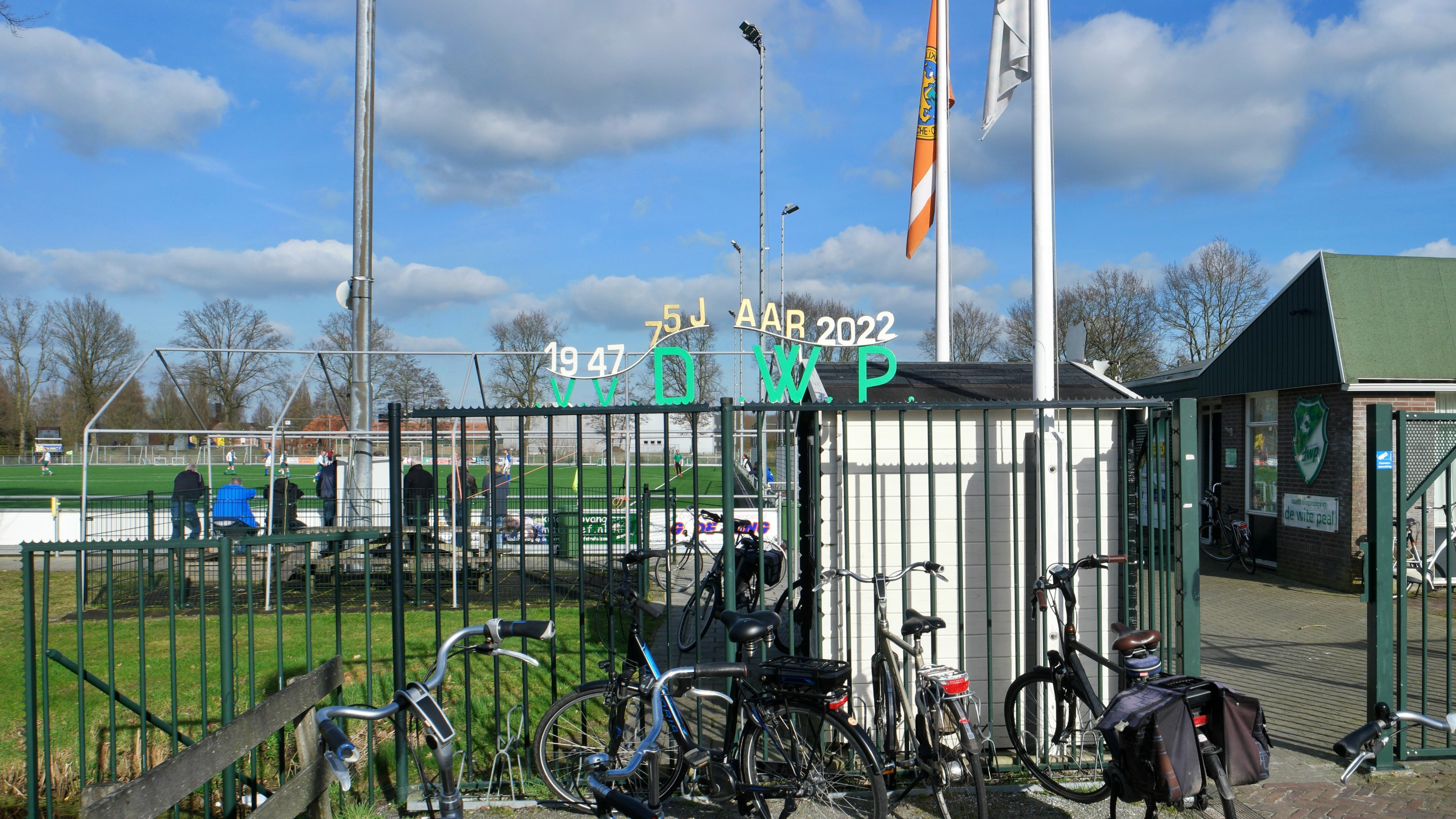
Football club De Wite Peal
