= Rohel =

Rohel Reahel
- Village
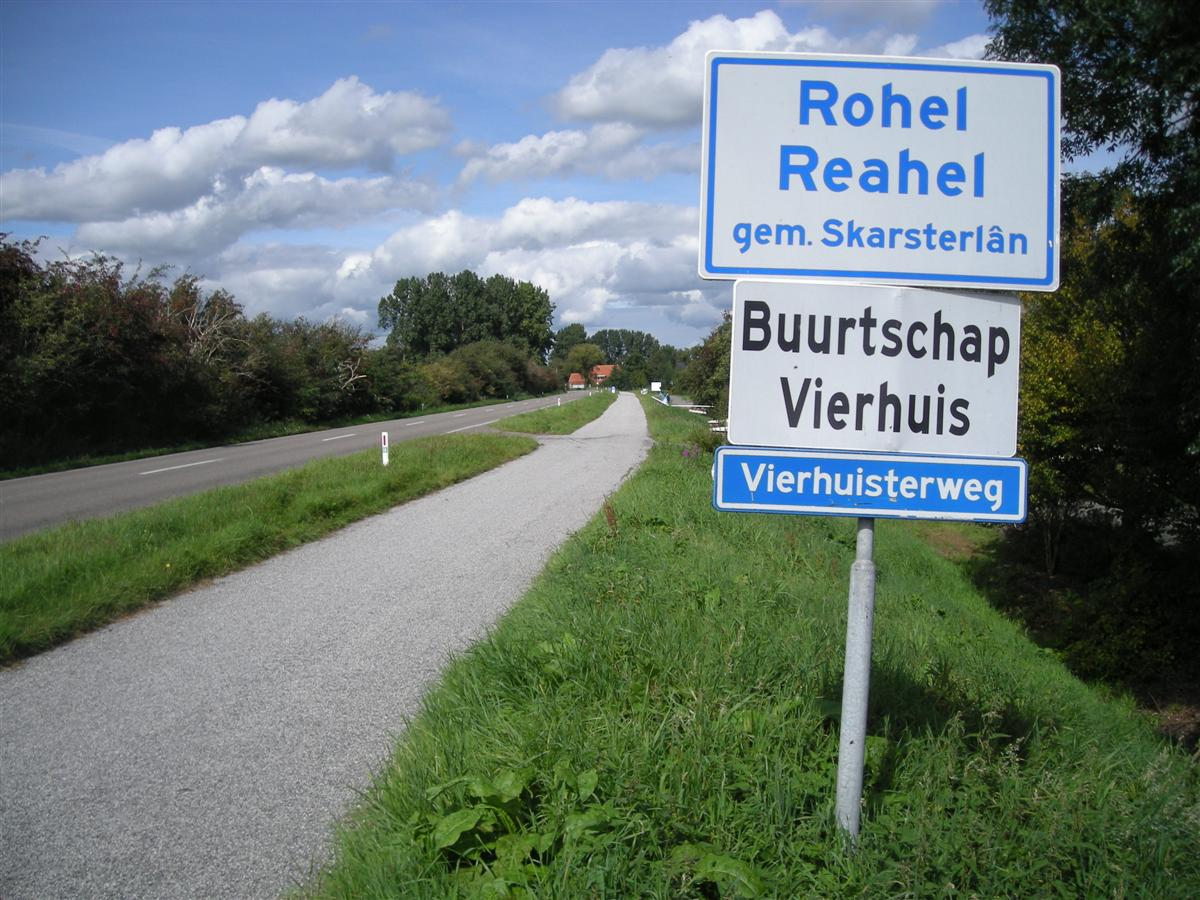
- Vierhuis vicinity

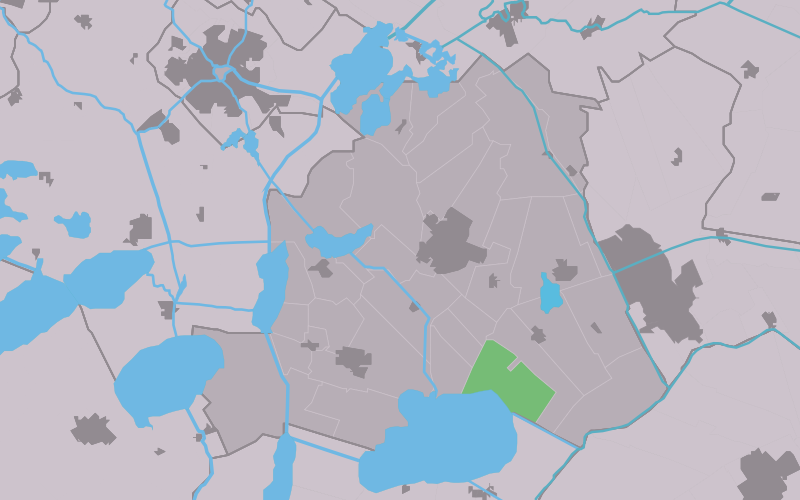
- Location in the former Skarsterlân municipality

- Location in the Netherlands Rohel (Netherlands)
- Country: Netherlands
- Province: Friesland
- Municipality: De Fryske Marren

Area
  - Total: 6.24 km^{2} (2.41 sq mi)
- Elevation: −1.5 m (−4.9 ft)

Population (2021)
  - Total: 215
  - Density: 34.5/km^{2} (89.2/sq mi)
- Time zone: UTC+1 (CET)
  - Summer (DST): UTC+2 (CEST)
- Postal code: 8507
- Dialing code: 0513

Rohel (West Frisian: Reahel) is a village in De Fryske Marren municipality in the province of Friesland, the Netherlands. It had a population of around 270 in 2017.

== History ==
The village was first mentioned in 1507 as "toe delffster nijegae". Rohel means "red low-lying moorland". In the 17th century, it was known as Nijegea. The Tjeukemeer, a large lake, slowly takes part of the village including the church and graveyard, and by 1750 only the hamlet Rohel is left. In 1840, it was home to 77 people. Since the 1960s, camping grounds have been established in Rohel, however permanent habitation is not allowed.

Before 2014, Rohel was part of the Skarsterlân municipality and before 1984 it was part of Haskerland. Before 1934, Rohel was part of the Schoterland municipality.
