= Nijehaske =

- Neighbourhood and village
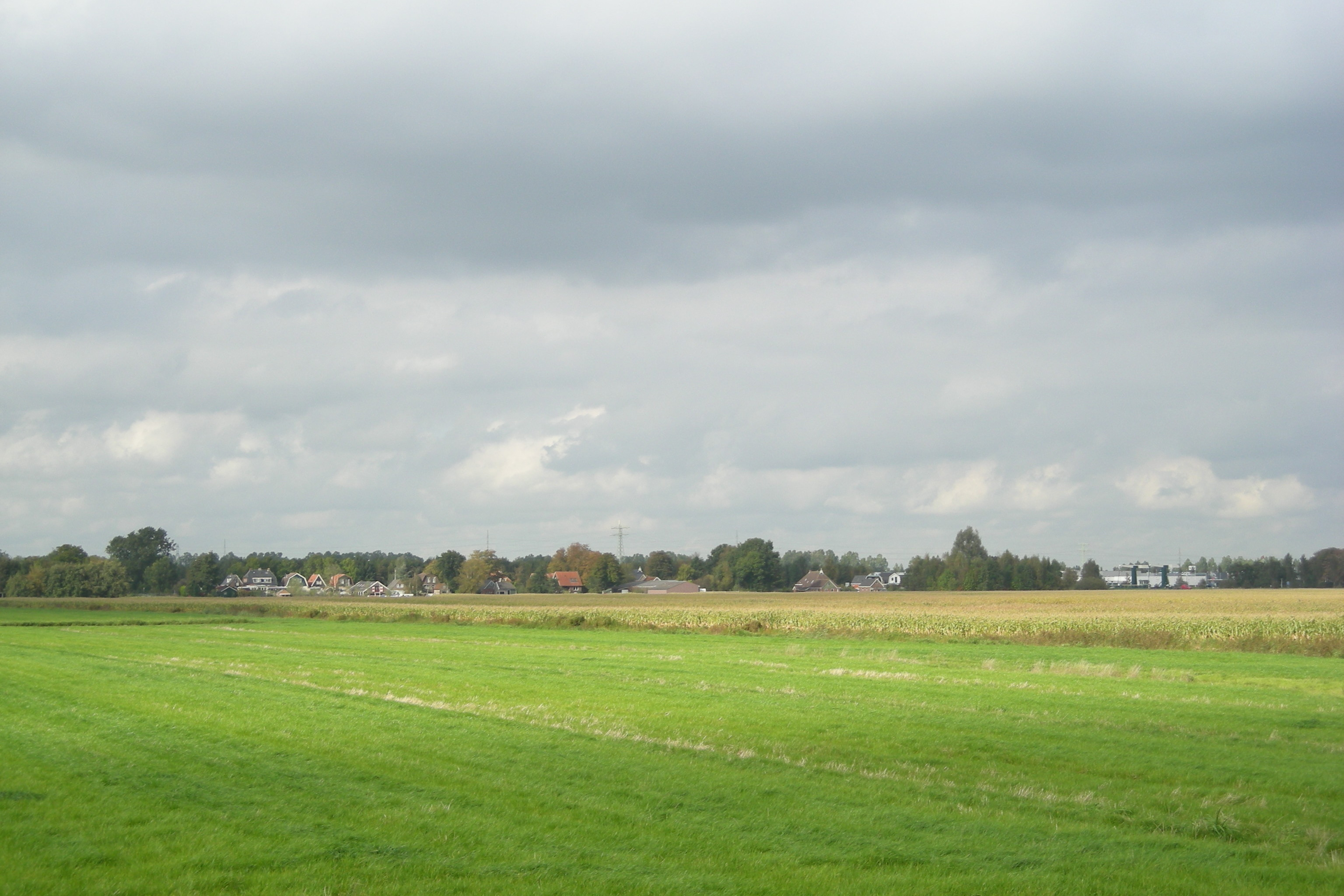

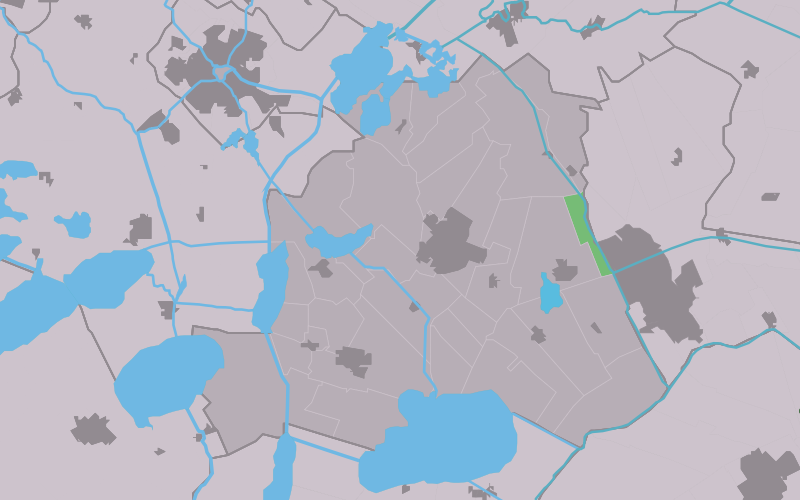
- Location in the former Skarsterlân municipality

- Location in the Netherlands Nijehaske (Netherlands)
- Country: Netherlands
- Province: Friesland
- Municipality: De Fryske Marren; Heerenveen

Area
  - Total: 0.44 km^{2} (0.17 sq mi)
- Elevation: 0.0 m (0 ft)

Population (2021)
  - Total: 55
  - Density: 120/km^{2} (320/sq mi)
- Time zone: UTC+1 (CET)
  - Summer (DST): UTC+2 (CEST)
- Postal code: 8466
- Dialing code: 0513

Nijehaske is a village in De Fryske Marren municipality, west of Heerenveen in the province of Friesland, the Netherlands. It had a population of around 55 in 2017. In 1934, most of Nijehaske was transferred to Heerenveen and has become a neighbourhood.

== History ==
The village was first mentioned in 1496 as Nya Hascha, and has Nije (new) to distinguish from Oudehaske. Haske is probably a type of grass. Nijehaske is a northern settlement of Oudehaske, and was a 16th-century peat excavation project. The Dutch Reformed Church was built in 1775, but has been transferred to Heerenveen. In 1840, it was home to 1,105 people.

Before 2014, Goingarijp was part of the Skarsterlân municipality and before 1984 it was part of Haskerland.

== Gallery ==
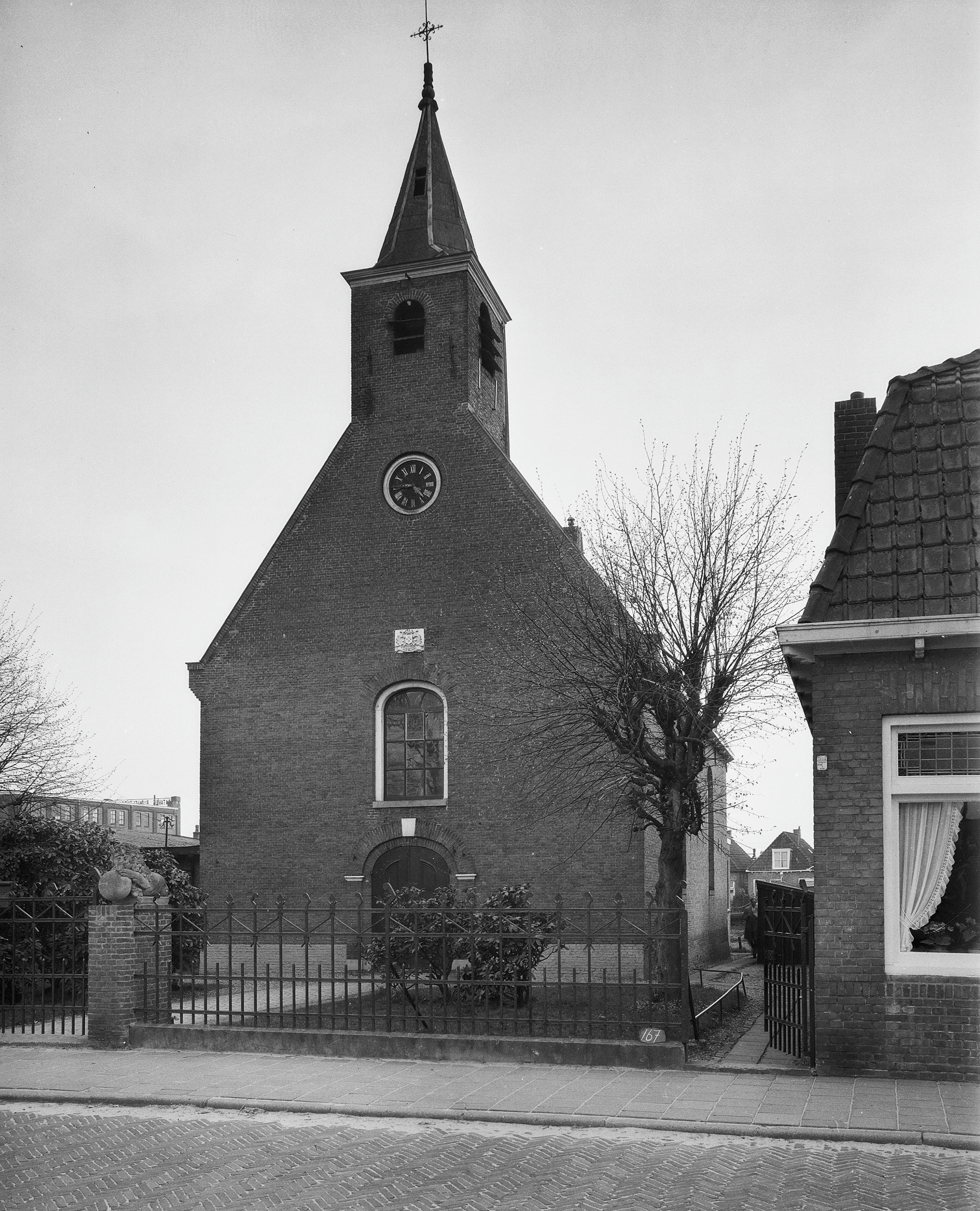
Church at Nijehaske

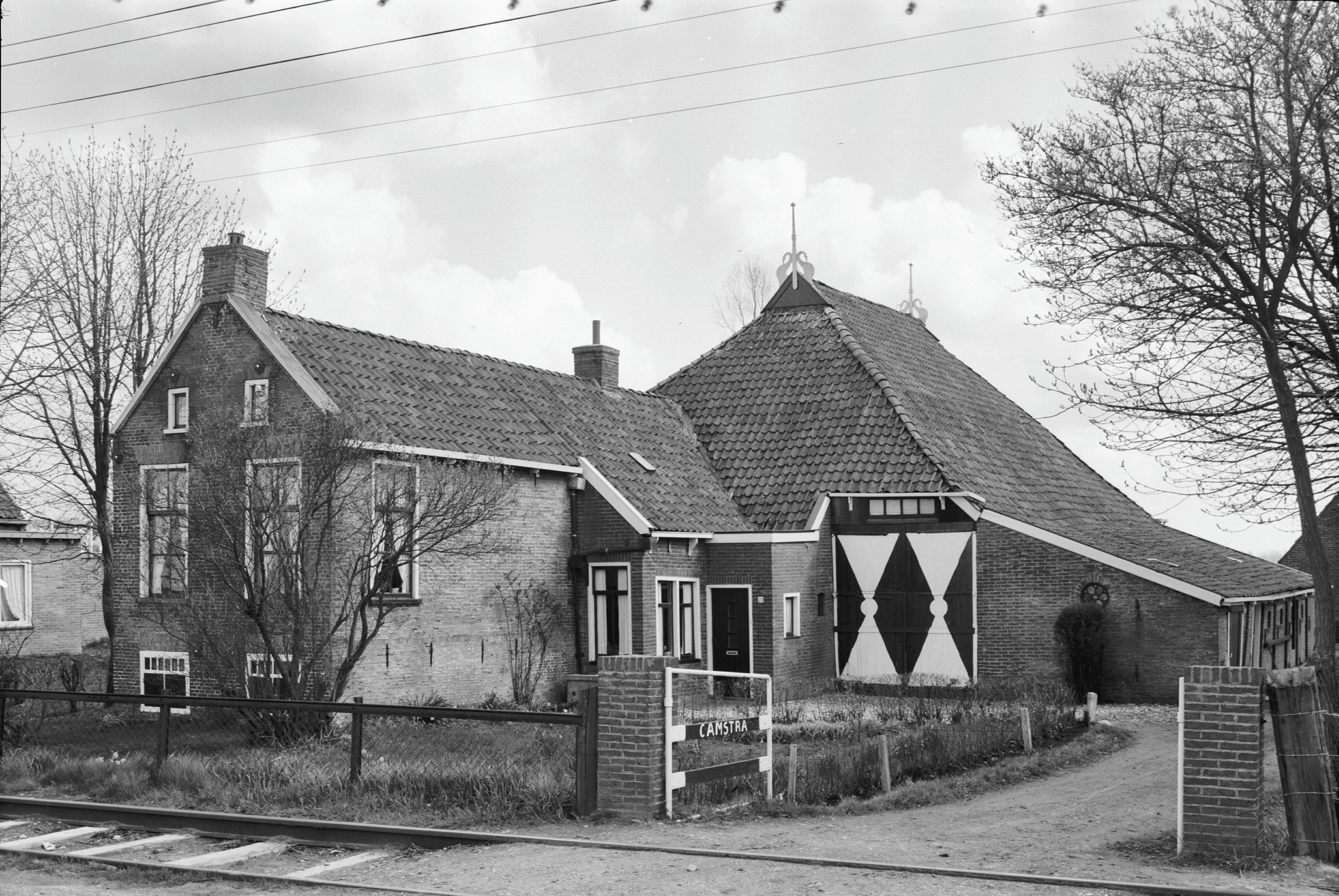
Farm in Nijehaske
