= Rotsterhaule =

- Village
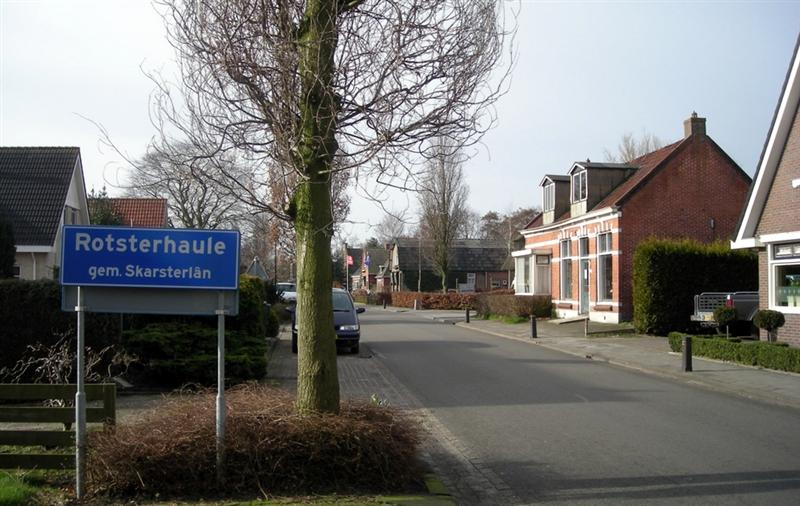

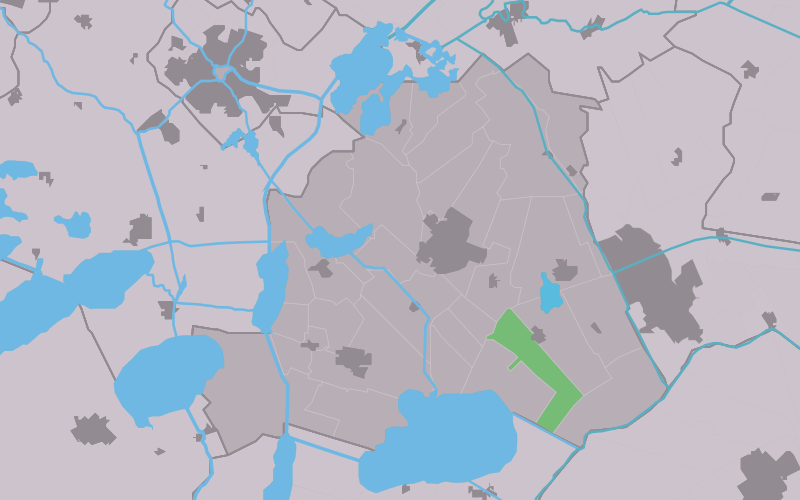
- Location in the former Skarsterlân municipality

- Location in the Netherlands Rotsterhaule (Netherlands)
- Country: Netherlands
- Province: Friesland
- Municipality: De Fryske Marren

Area
  - Total: 9.79 km^{2} (3.78 sq mi)
- Elevation: −1.5 m (−4.9 ft)

Population (2021)
  - Total: 580
  - Density: 59/km^{2} (150/sq mi)
- Time zone: UTC+1 (CET)
  - Summer (DST): UTC+2 (CEST)
- Postal code: 8463
- Dialing code: 0513

Rotsterhaule is a village in De Fryske Marren municipality in the province of Friesland, the Netherlands. It had a population of around 565 in 2017.

== History ==
It was first mentioned in 1490 as "op Rotster Haula", and means Haule belonging to Rottum. The etymology of Haule is unclear. Rotsterhaule started as a peat excavation project and attracted many people from Overijssel and specifically the Giethoorn region. A chapel has been known to exist since 1490 and was demolished in 1580. In 1840, it was home to 379 people. In 1920, a little church was built which remained in operation until 1982.

Before 2014, Rotsterhaule was part of the Skarsterlân municipality and before 1984 it was part of Haskerland. Before 1934, Rotsterhaule was part of the Schoterland municipality.
