= Nieuwebrug, Friesland =

Nieuwebrug Nijbrêge
- Village
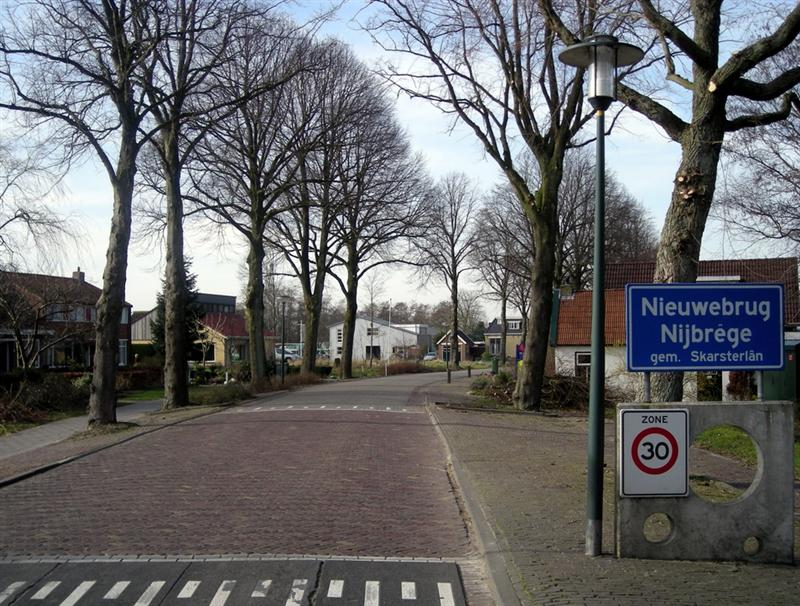

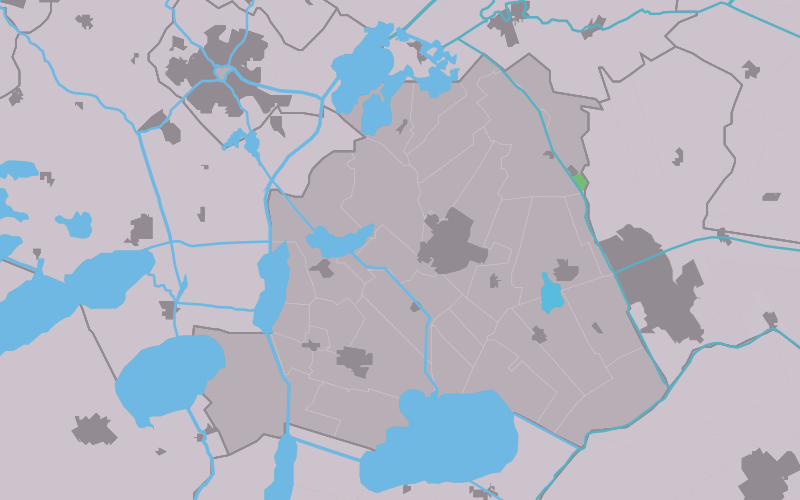
- Location in the former Skarsterlân municipality

- Location in the Netherlands Nieuwebrug (Netherlands)
- Country: Netherlands
- Province: Friesland
- Municipality: Heerenveen

Area
  - Total: 0.65 km^{2} (0.25 sq mi)
- Elevation: 0.2 m (0.66 ft)

Population (2021)
  - Total: 215
  - Density: 330/km^{2} (860/sq mi)
- Time zone: UTC+1 (CET)
  - Summer (DST): UTC+2 (CEST)
- Postal code: 8469
- Dialing code: 0513

Nieuwebrug (West Frisian: Nijbrêge) is a village in Heerenveen in the province of Friesland, the Netherlands. It had a population of around 215 in 2017.

== History ==
The village was first mentioned in 1846 as Nieuwebrug, and translates to "new bridge" which refers to a bridge on the Leeuwarden-Heerenveen road. In 1840, it was home to 197 people.

Before 2014, Nieuwebrug was part of the Skarsterlân municipality and before 1984 it was earlier part of Heerenveen.
