= Roelof ten Napel =

Dutch writer (born 1993)

- Born: 1993 (age 32–33); Joure, Netherlands
- Writing career
- Years active: 2014–present
- Website: www.roeloftennapel.nl

Roelof ten Napel (born 1993, Joure) is a Dutch writer, poet, and essayist. In 2022 he won De Grote Poëzieprijs (Grand Poetry Prize). His work has also been nominated for the Joost Zwagerman Essay Prize. In 2015 he was awarded the C.C.S. Crone Stipendium. He is the brother of writer and philosopher Harm Hendrik ten Napel.

== Background ==
After earning a bachelor’s degree in mathematics, ten Napel completed a research master’s degree in the philosophy of science at Utrecht University.

== Writing career ==
In 2012 and 2013, Ten Napel took part in the writers' platform ABC Yourself under the guidance of Edward van de Vendel. On 14 October 2014, Constellations was published by Atlas Contact. Following its release, Ten Napel was awarded the C.C.S. Crone Stipendium. His poetry debut, Het woedeboek (The Book of Rage), was nominated for several awards in 2019. In 2022, Ten Napel won De Grote Poëzieprijs for his third poetry collection, Dagen in huis (Days at Home).

== Bibliography ==
- 2014 – Constellations, prose
- 2017 – Het leven zelf (Life Itself), novel
- 2018 – Het woedeboek (The Book of Rage), poetry collection
- 2020 – In het vlees (In the Flesh), poetry collection
- 2020 – Een zoon van (A Son of), novel
- 2021 – Dagen in huis (Days at Home), poetry collection
- 2024 – Over het zwijgen (On Remaining Silent), novel

== Awards and nominations ==
- 2015 – C.C.S. Crone Stipendium for Constellations
- 2018 – Nomination for the Jongerenliteratuur Prijs for Life Itself
- 2019 – Nomination for the C. Buddingh' Prize
- 2019 – Nomination for De Grote Poëzieprijs
- 2019 – Nomination for the Poëziedebuutprijs aan Zee for The Book of Rage
- 2019 – School der Poëzie Youth Prize for The Book of Rage
- 2021 – Winner of De Grote Poëzieprijs for Days at Home
- 2022 – Nomination for the Joost Zwagerman Essayprijs
- 2024 – Nomination for the BNG Literatuurprijs for On Remaining Silent
