= Haskerland =

Dissolved municipality of Friesland, Netherlands

Haskerland Haskerlân
- Former municipality
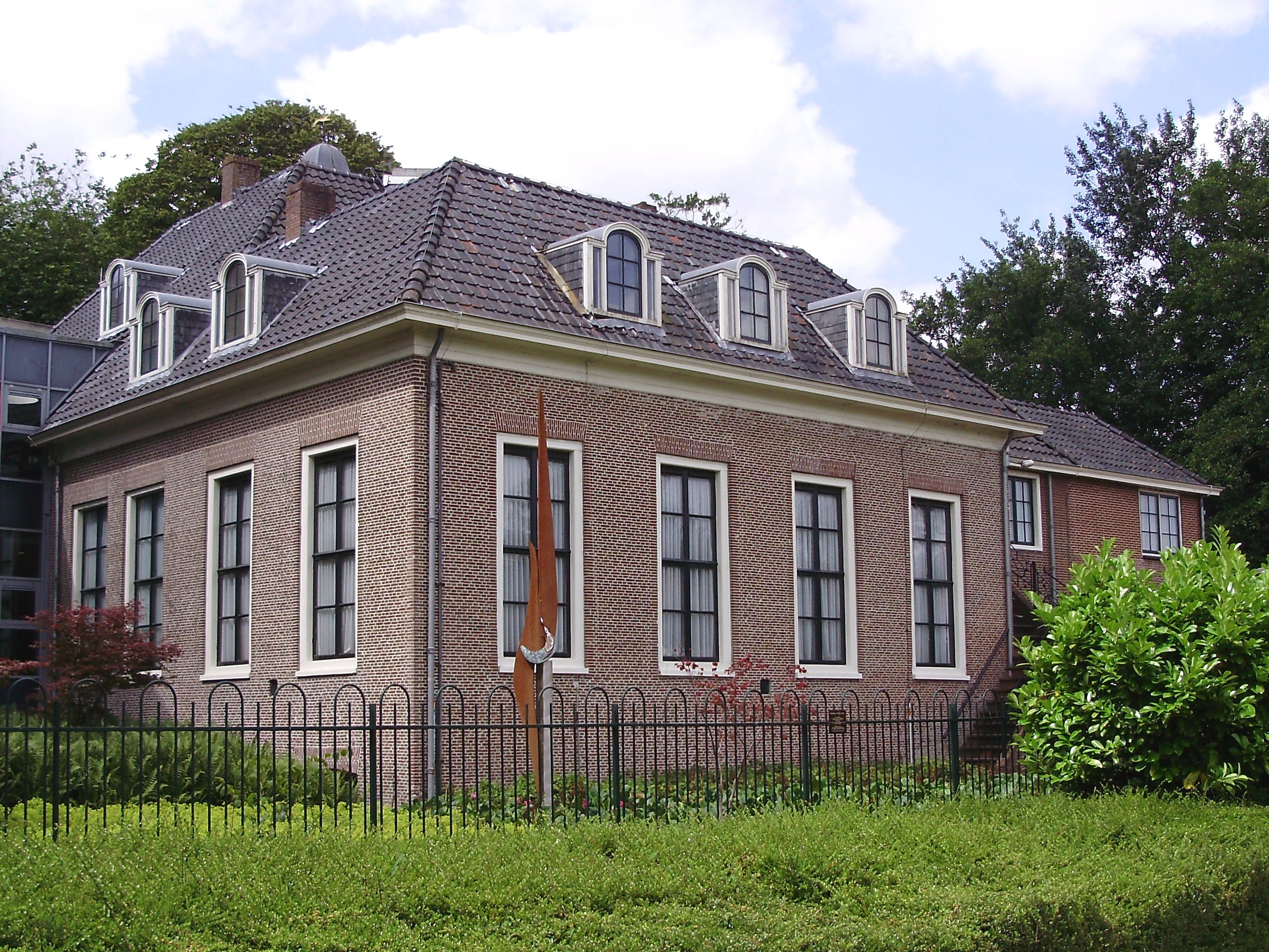

- Flag Coat of arms

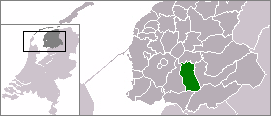
- Location in Friesland in 1983
- Coordinates: 52°57′05″N 5°50′48″E
- Country: Netherlands
- Province: Friesland
- Established: 1 October 1816
- Dissolved: 1 January 1984

Area
  - Total: 95.94 km^{2} (37.04 sq mi)

Population (1981)
  - Total: 15,667
  - Density: 163.3/km^{2} (423/sq mi)
- Time zone: UTC+1 (CET)
  - Summer (DST): UTC+2 (CEST)

Haskerland (West Frisian: Haskerlân) is a former municipality in the province of Friesland in the Netherlands. The name was originally West Frisian, a compound of haske ('a type of grass') and lân ('land').

The municipality was dissolved on 1 January 1984 into Skarsterlân. In 2014, the municipality of Skarsterlân merged into De Fryske Marren.

== Population centres ==
Haskerland had thirteen villages. Its capital was Joure.

Dutch Name	West Frisian
Oudehaske	Aldehaske
Delfstrahuizen	Dolsterhuzen
Haskerdijken	Haskerdiken
Joure	De Jouwer
Nijehaske	Nijehaske
Rohel	Reahel
Rotstergaast	Rotstergaast
Rotsterhaule	Rotserhaule
Rottum	Rottum
Sintjohannesga	Sint-Jânsgea
Snikzwaag	Sniksweach
Vegelinsoord	Vegelinsoard

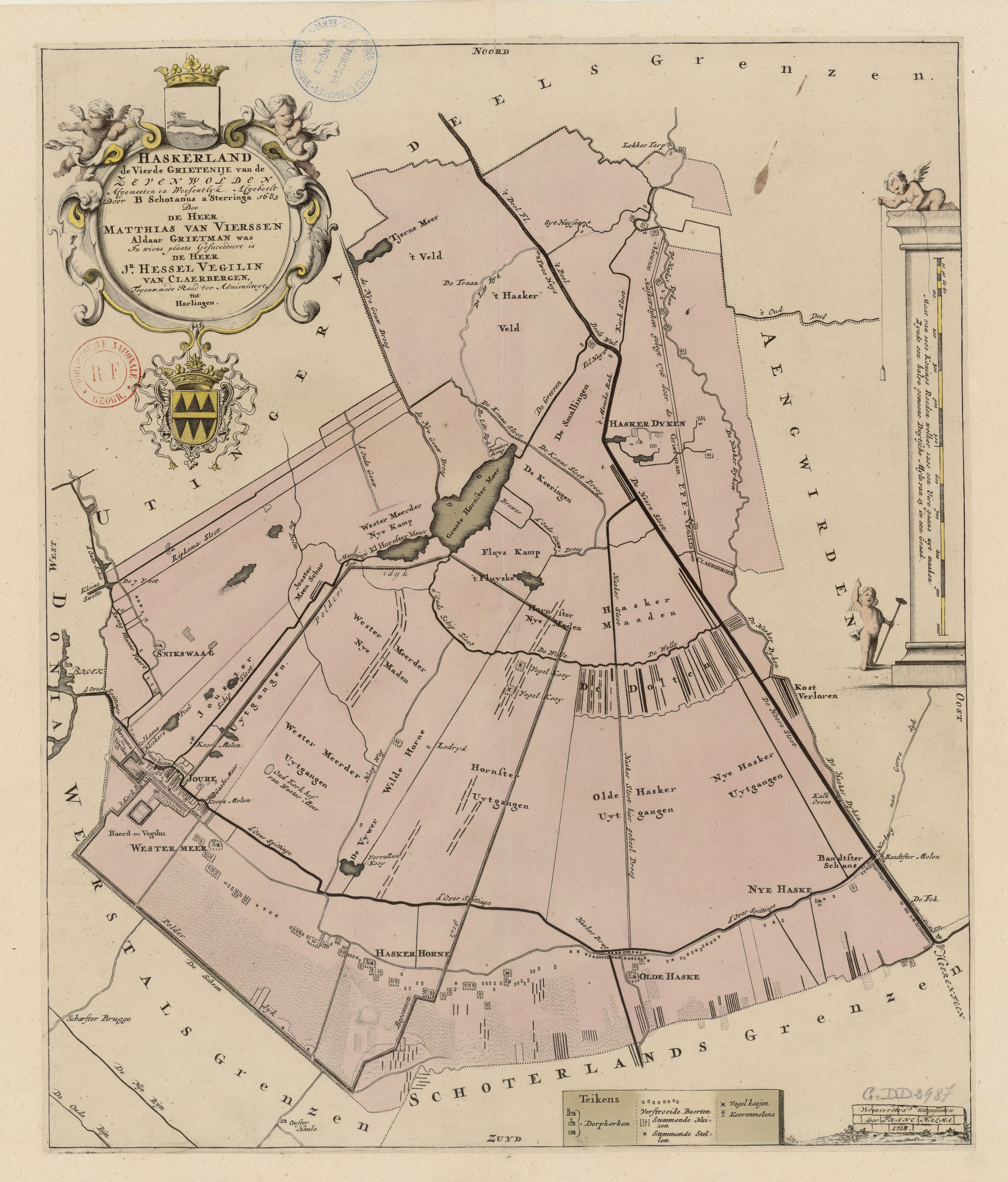
Map of the municipality of Haskerland (1718)

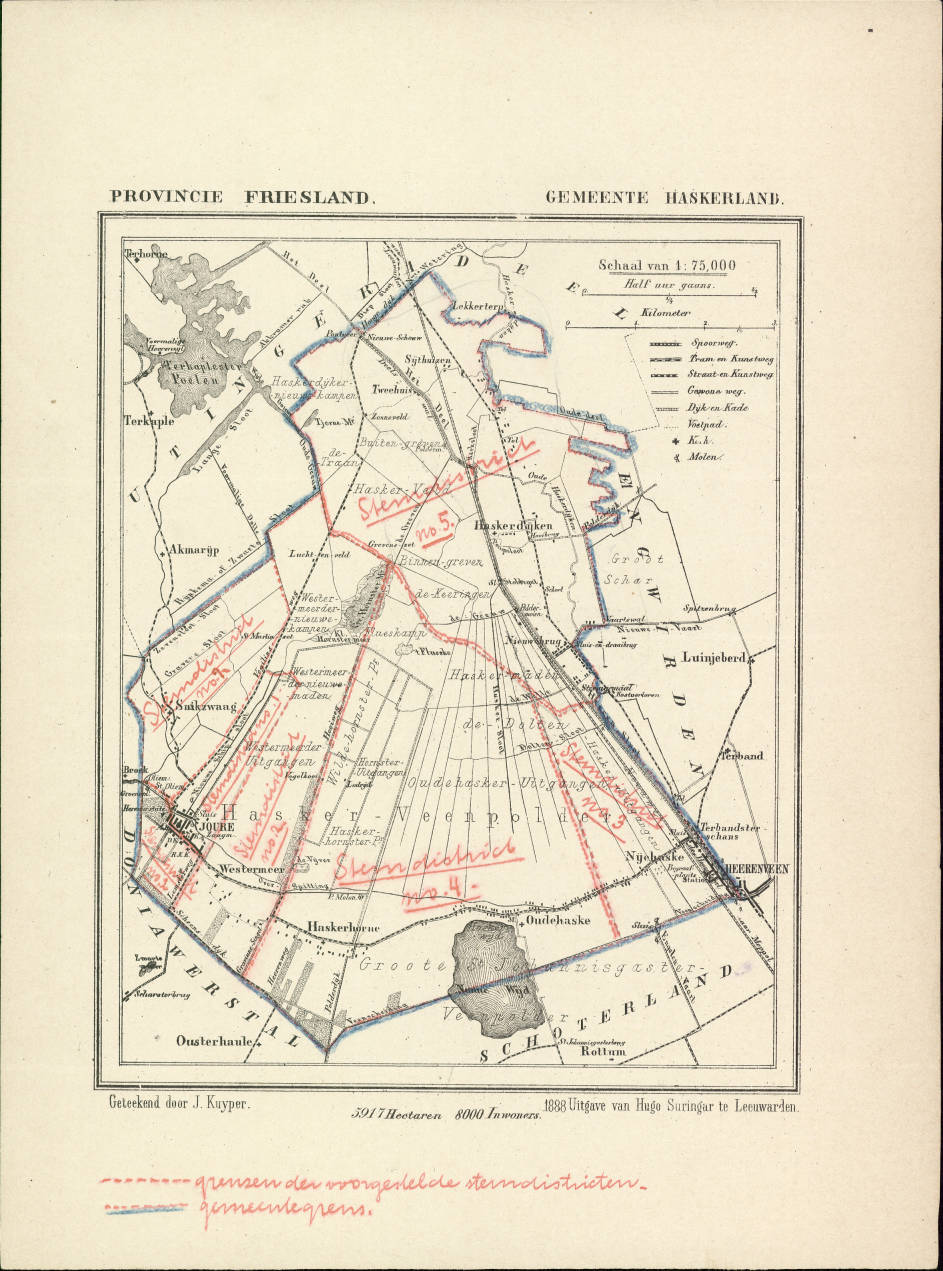
Map of the municipality of Haskerland (1888)
