= Skarsterlân =

Skarsterlân Scharsterland
- Former municipality
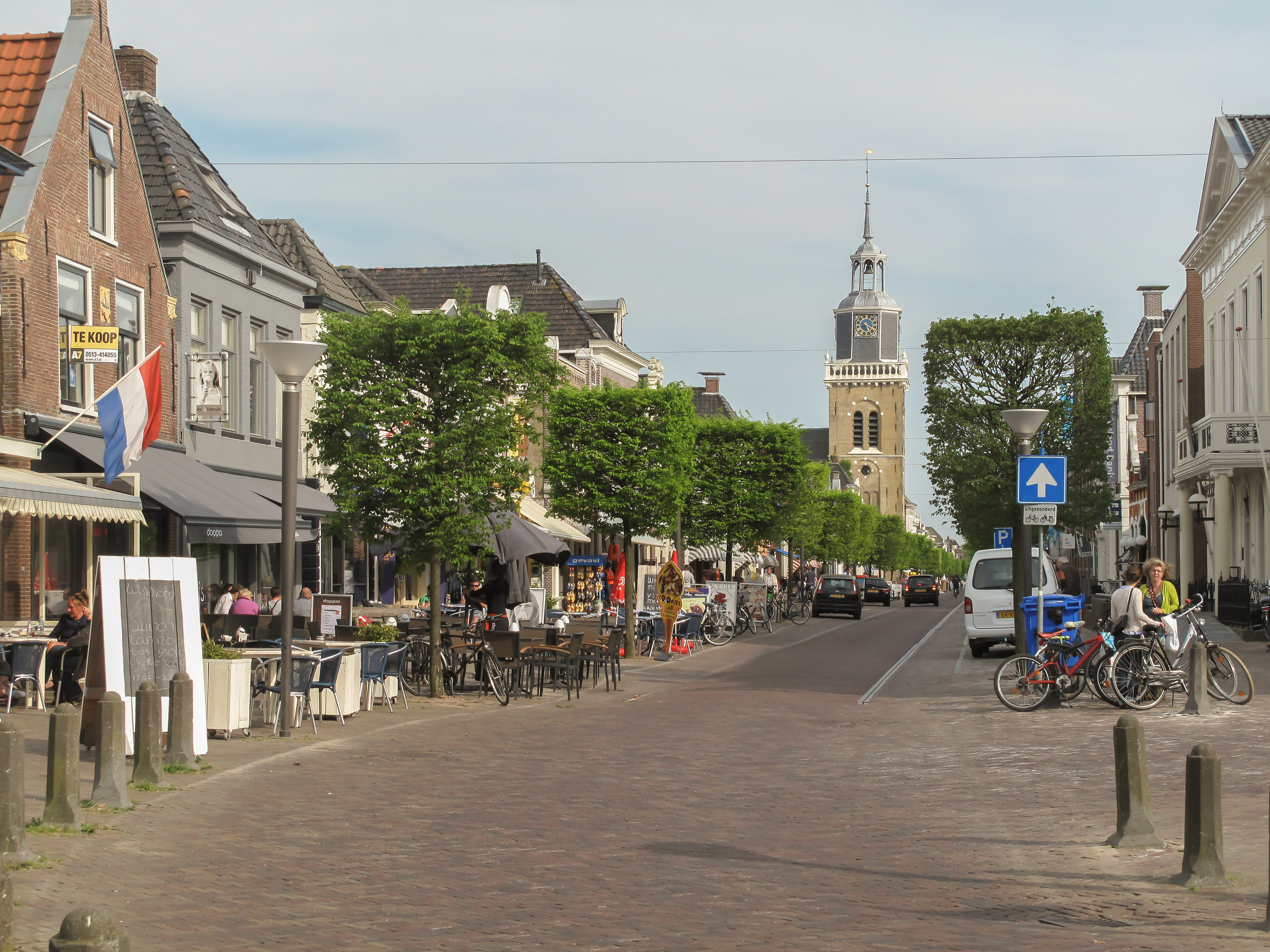
- Joure town centre

- Flag Coat of arms

- Location in Friesland
- Coordinates: 52°58′N 5°47′E
- Country: Netherlands
- Province: Friesland
- Established: 1 January 1984
- Dissolved: 1 January 2014

Area
  - Total: 216.80 km^{2} (83.71 sq mi)
  - Land: 185.26 km^{2} (71.53 sq mi)
  - Water: 31.54 km^{2} (12.18 sq mi)
- Elevation: 2 m (6.6 ft)

Population (November 2013)
  - Total: 27,467
  - Density: 148/km^{2} (380/sq mi)
- Time zone: UTC+1 (CET)
  - Summer (DST): UTC+2 (CEST)
- Postcode: 8460–8544
- Area code: 0513, 0514

Skarsterlân (West Frisian: [ˈskarstəˌlɔ̃ːn]; Dutch: Scharsterland [ˈsxɑrstərˌlɑnt]) is a former municipality in the province of Friesland in the Netherlands. The municipality was created 1 January 1984 by merging the municipalities of Doniawerstal and Haskerland, the part of Utingeradeel consisting of the villages Akmarijp and Terkaple and the village Nieuwebrug that used to belong to Heerenveen. City hall was located in Joure. On 1 January 2014 it merged with the municipalities of Lemsterland and Gaasterlân-Sleat to form the new municipality De Fryske Marren.

At first, the Dutch name Scharsterland was chosen, but as of 1 March 1985, the West Frisian name Skarsterlân was adopted and the Dutch name became obsolete.

== Population centres ==
Akmarijp, Boornzwaag, Broek, Dijken, Doniaga, Goingarijp, Haskerdijken, Haskerhorne, Idskenhuizen, Joure, Langweer, Legemeer, Nieuwebrug, Nijehaske, Oldeouwer, Oudehaske, Ouwster-Nijega, Ouwsterhaule, Rohel, Rotstergast, Rotsterhaule, Rottum, Scharsterbrug, Sint Nicolaasga, Sintjohannesga, Snikzwaag, Terkaple, Teroele, Tjerkgaast and Vegelinsoord.
