= Rottum, Friesland =

Rottum
- Village
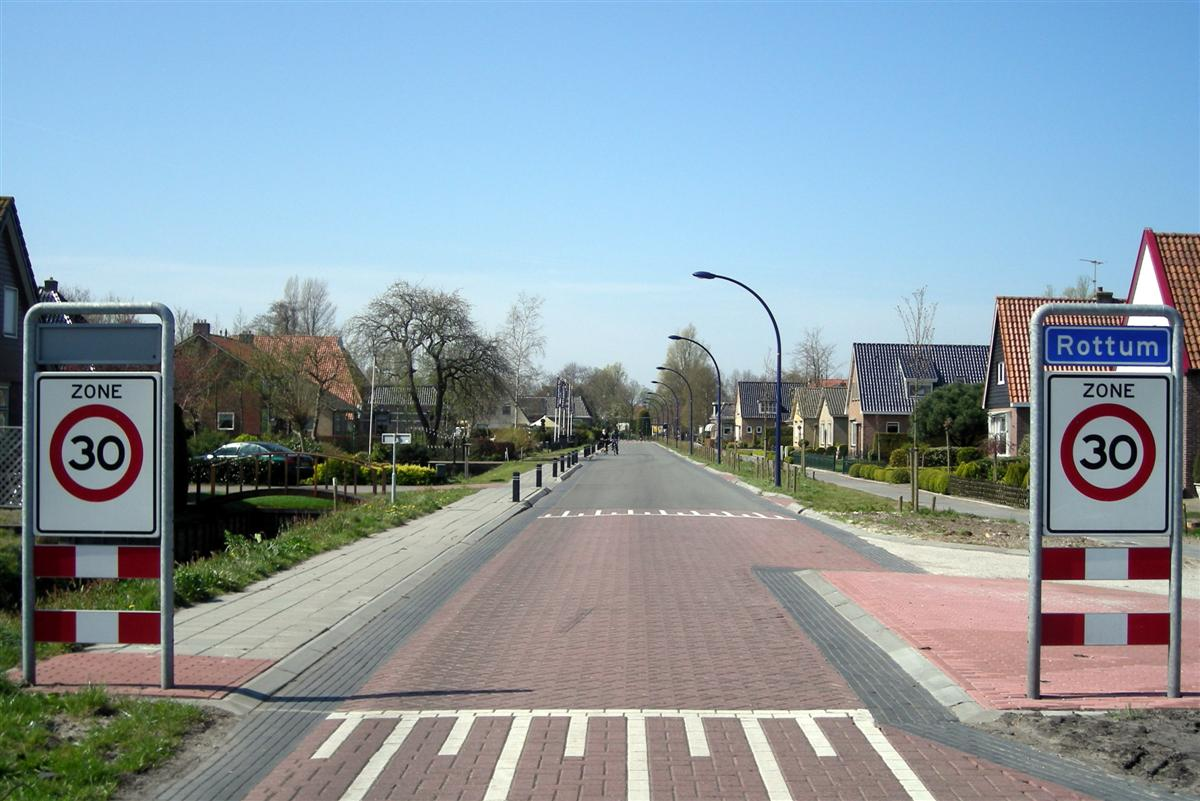
- Rottum, east village entrance

- Flag Coat of arms

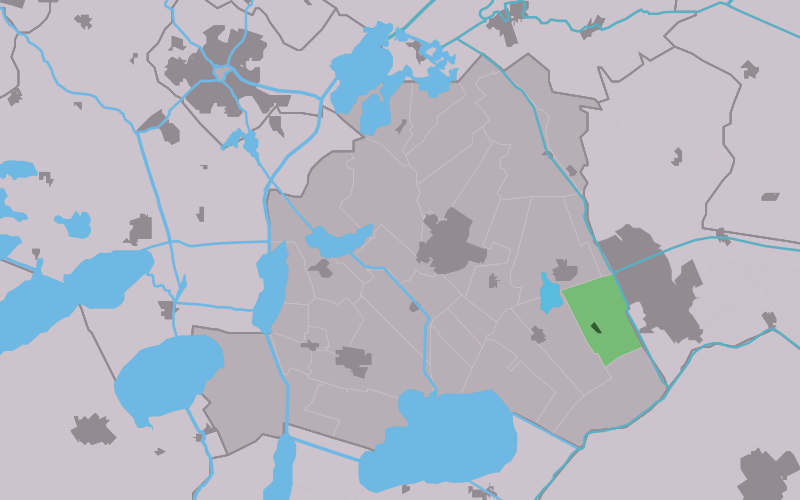
- Location in the former Skarsterlân municipality

- Location in the Netherlands Rottum (Netherlands)
- Country: Netherlands
- Province: Friesland
- Municipality: De Fryske Marren

Area
  - Total: 6.93 km^{2} (2.68 sq mi)
- Elevation: −0.5 m (−1.6 ft)

Population (2021)
  - Total: 750
  - Density: 110/km^{2} (280/sq mi)
- Time zone: UTC+1 (CET)
  - Summer (DST): UTC+2 (CEST)
- Postal code: 8461
- Telephone area: 0513

Rottum is a village in De Fryske Marren in the province of Friesland, the Netherlands. It had a population of around 675 in 2017.

== History ==
It was first mentioned in the late 13th century as Ruthne. A chapel was constructed in the 14th century, and the judge for Zevenwouden had its seat in Rottum. Landtags were also held in the village. The chapel was replaced by a church in 1414, and demolished in 1791. Only the bell tower remains. In 1840, it was home to 209 people.

Before 2014, Rottum was part of the Skarsterlân municipality and before 1984 it was part of Haskerland. Before 1934, Rottum was part of the Schoterland municipality.

== Notable people ==
- Antoinette de Jong (born 1995), speed skater

== Gallery ==
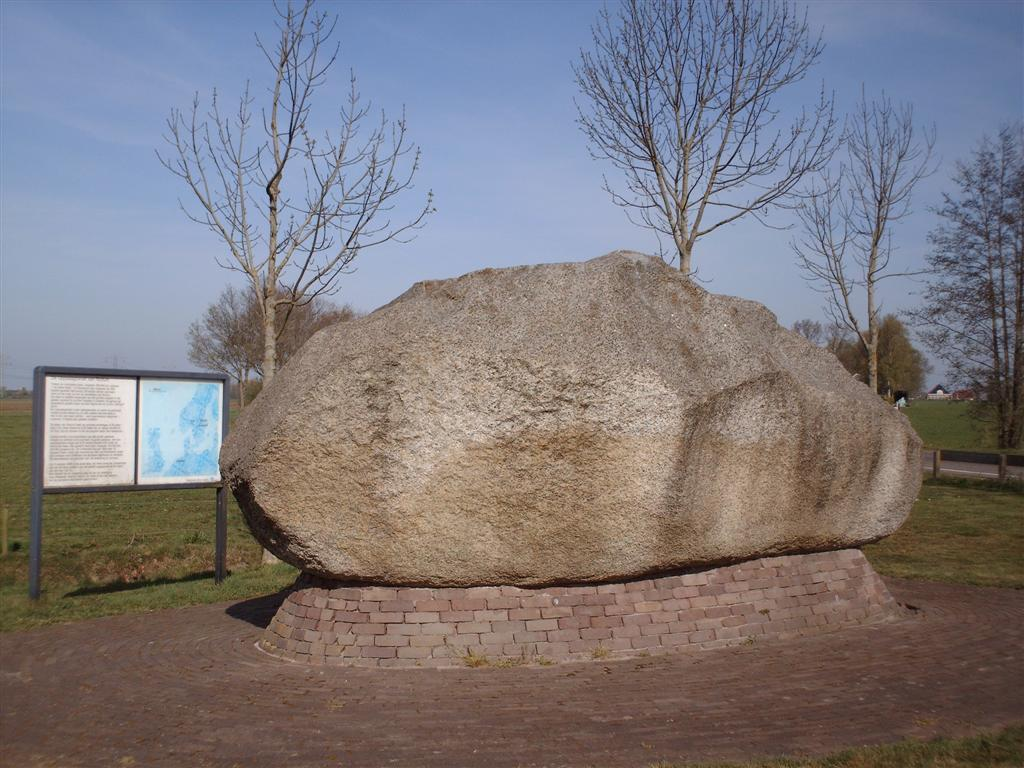
Stone in Rottum

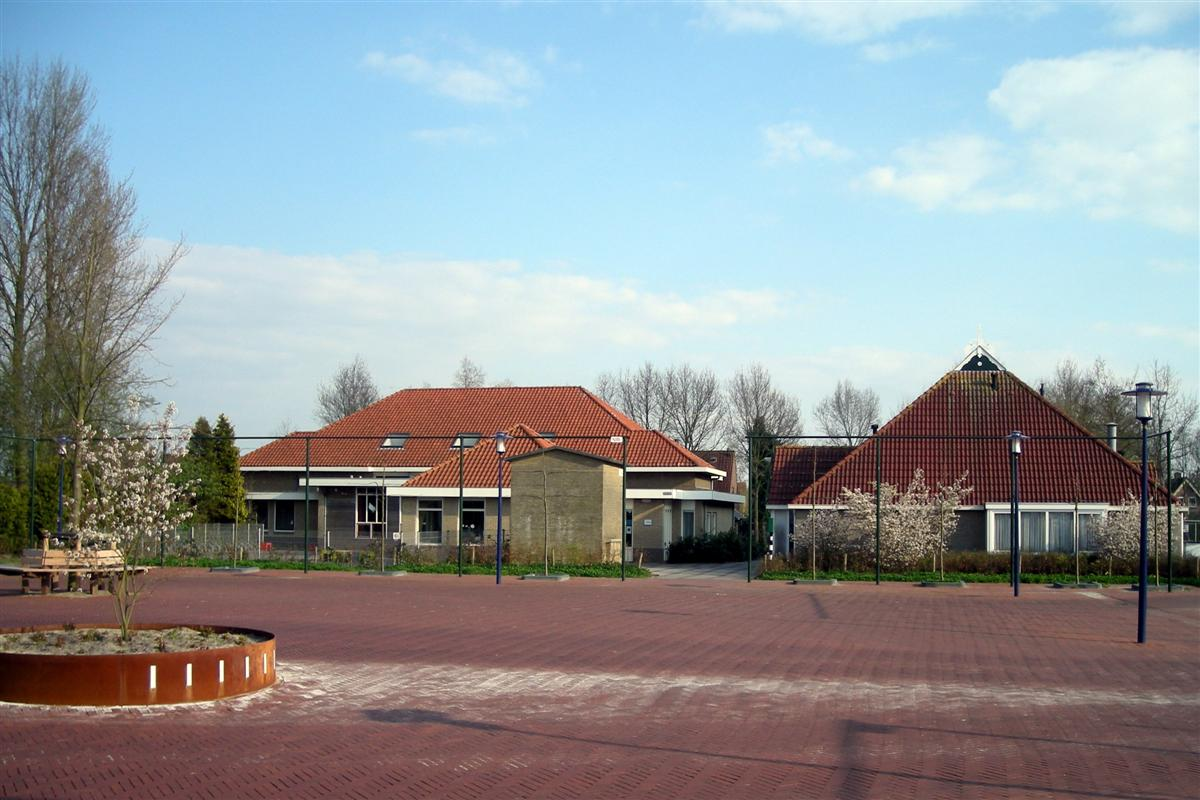
School and village house
