= Oudehaske =

Oudehaske Aldehaske
- Village
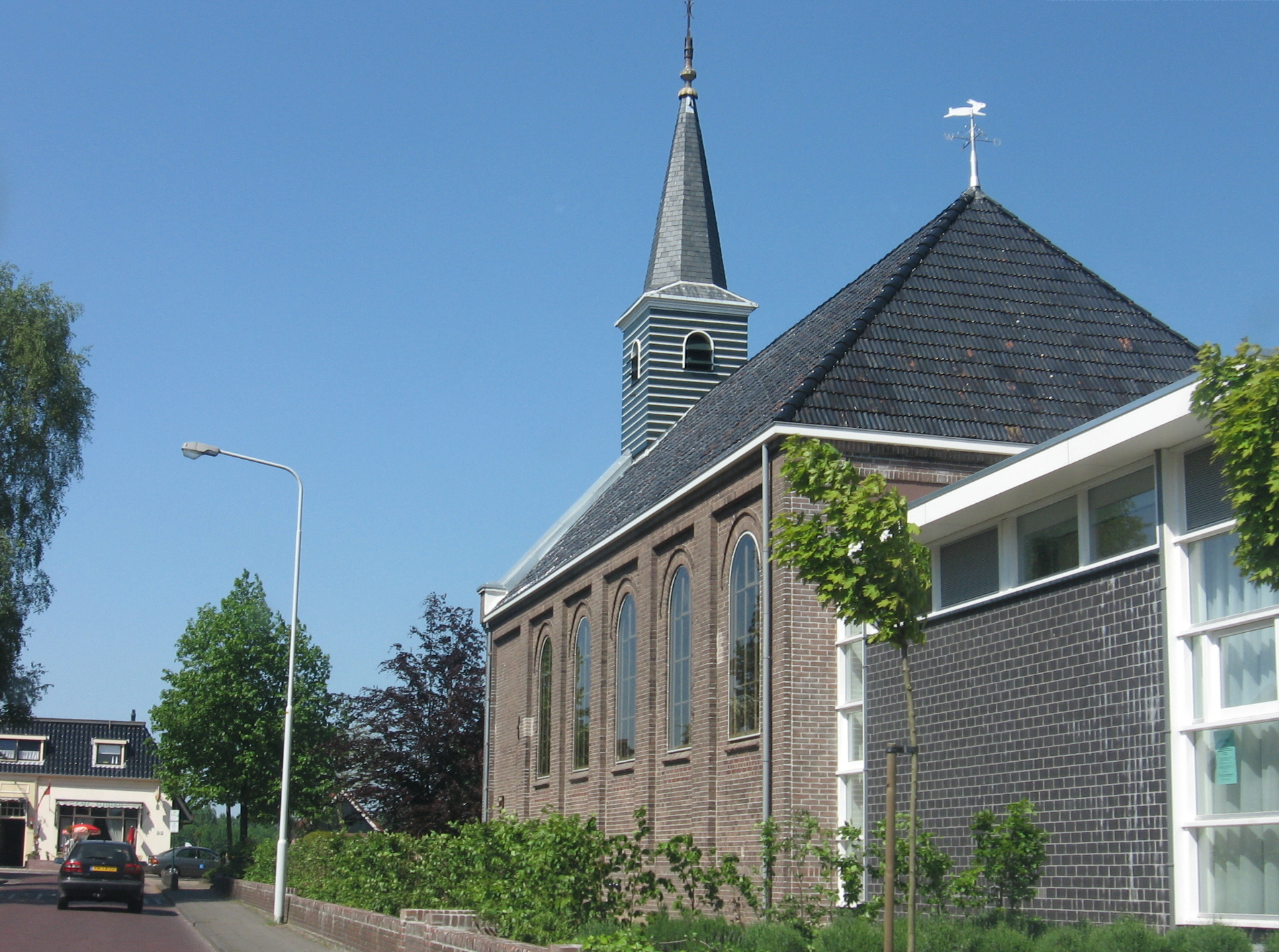
- Oudehaske church

- Flag Coat of arms

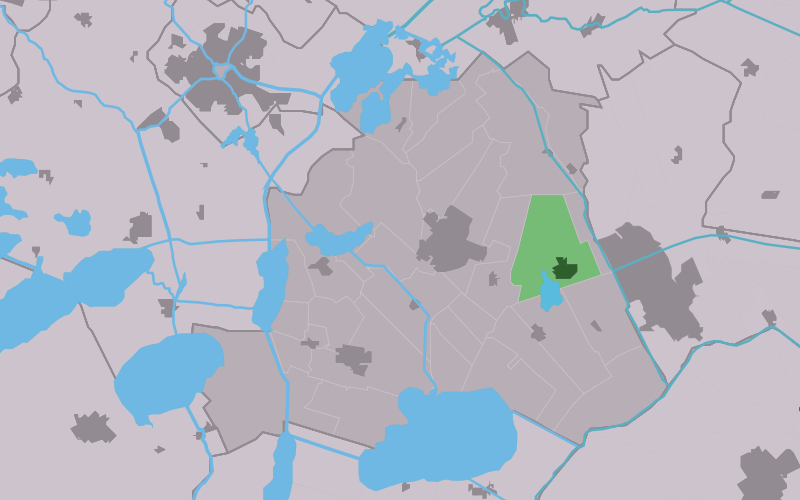
- Location in the former Skarsterlân municipality

- Location in the Netherlands Oudehaske (Netherlands)
- Country: Netherlands
- Province: Friesland
- Municipality: De Fryske Marren

Area
  - Total: 7.96 km^{2} (3.07 sq mi)
- Elevation: 0.1 m (0.33 ft)

Population (2021)
  - Total: 1,935
  - Density: 243/km^{2} (630/sq mi)
- Time zone: UTC+1 (CET)
  - Summer (DST): UTC+2 (CEST)
- Postal code: 8465
- Dialing code: 0513

Oudehaske (West Frisian: Aldehaske) is a village in De Fryske Marren in the province of Friesland, the Netherlands. It had a population of around 1980 in 2017.

== History ==
The village was first mentioned in 1315 as Hasca. Haske is probably a type of grass. Oude (old) has been added to distinguish from Nijehaske.

Oudehaske is a road village which developed on the Heerenveen to Joure main road. In the late 19th century, the former peat excavation areas were poldered. In 1840, it was home to 585 people. The Protestant Church was built in 1906. Oudehaske started to grow in the 1960s.

Before 2014, Oudehaske was part of the Skarsterlân municipality and before 1984 it was part of Haskerland.

Oudehaske is known in traffic engineering circles for the radical innovation in street design pioneered there by Hans Monderman, removing signs and using subtle cues to indicate that the roadways are shared space between pedestrians and other vehicles.

== Famous (former) residents ==
Former long-track speed skating coach Henk Gemser lives in Oudehaske.

Born in Oudehaske was Sjoerd de Vries (1941-2020), painter and graphic artist.

== Gallery ==
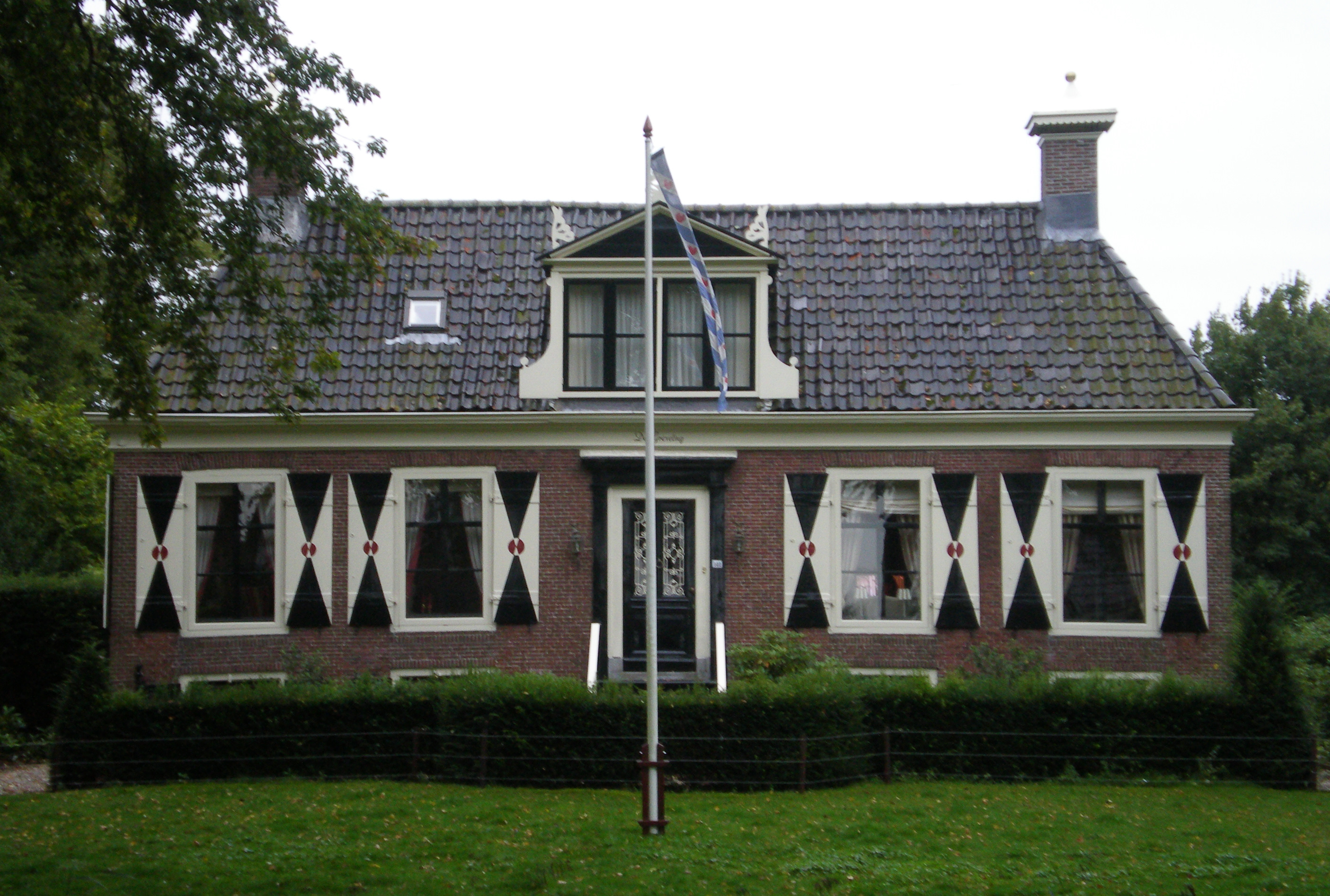
Farm in Oudehaske

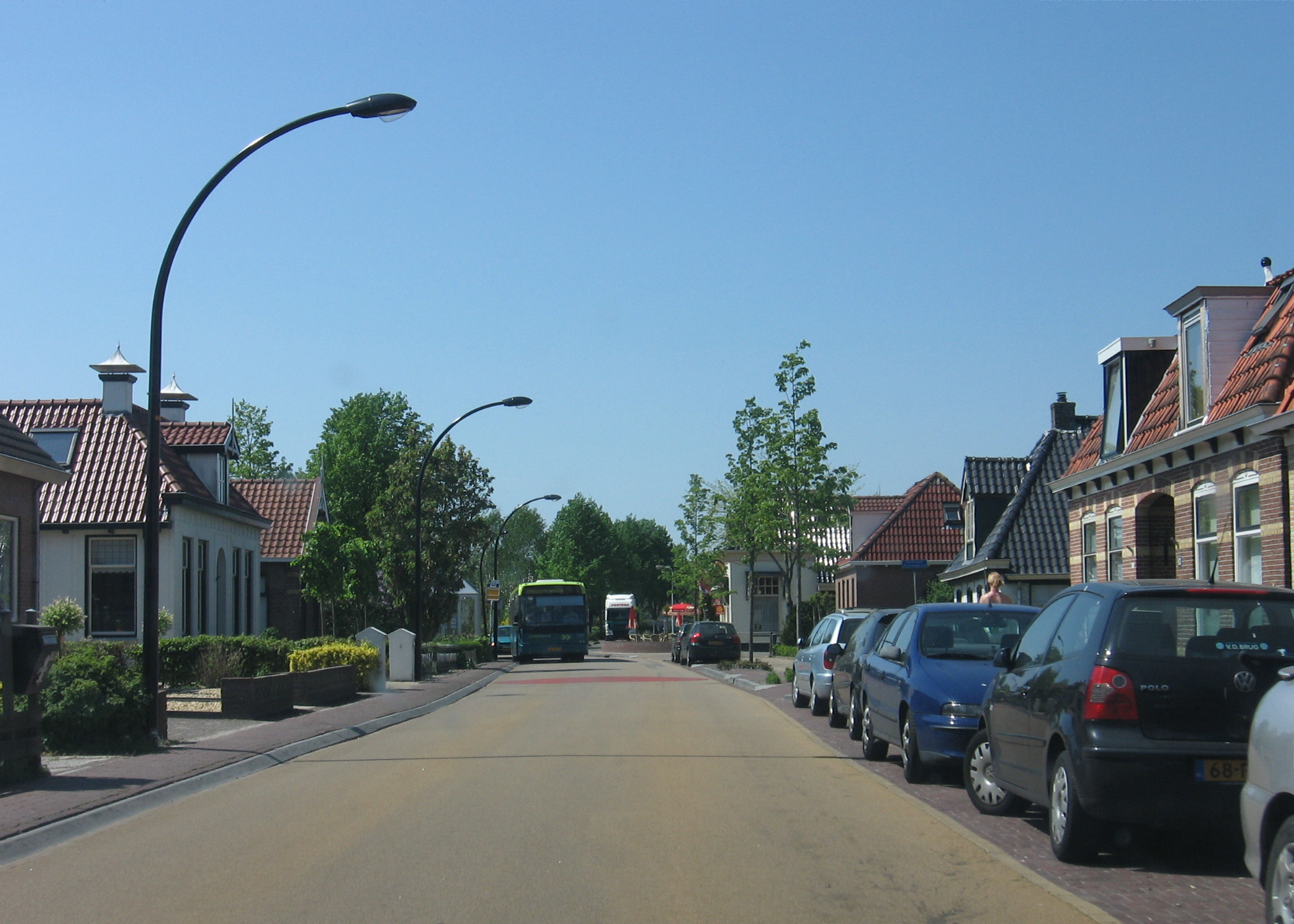
Street view

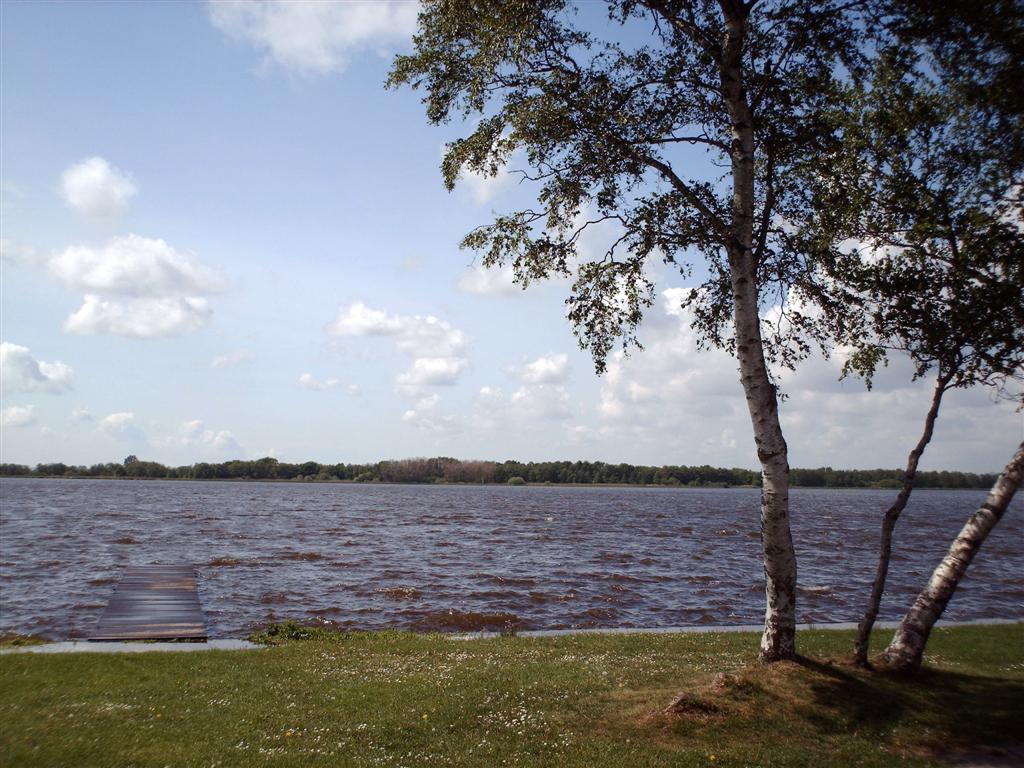
Nannewijd, lake near Oudehaske
