= Goingarijp =

Goingarijp Goaiïngaryp
- Village
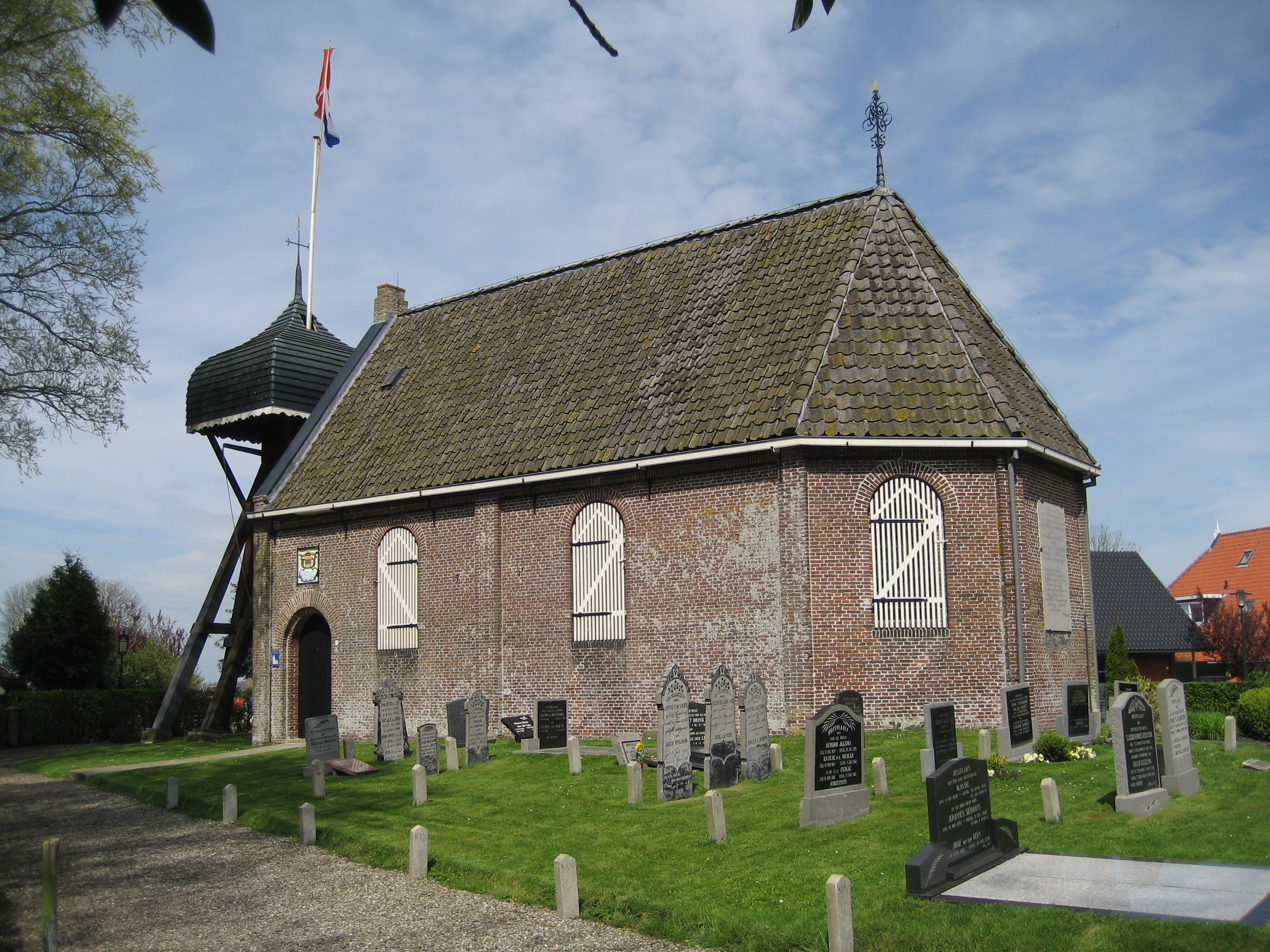
- Goingarijp church and bell tower

- Flag

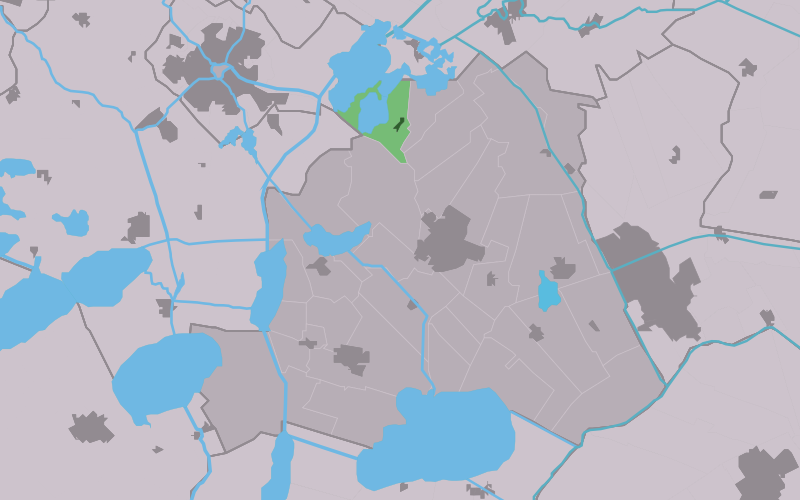
- Location in the former Skarsterlân municipality

- Location in the Netherlands Goingarijp (Netherlands)
- Country: Netherlands
- Province: Friesland
- Municipality: De Fryske Marren

Area
  - Total: 9.29 km^{2} (3.59 sq mi)
- Elevation: −0.4 m (−1.3 ft)

Population (2021)
  - Total: 250
  - Density: 27/km^{2} (70/sq mi)
- Time zone: UTC+1 (CET)
  - Summer (DST): UTC+2 (CEST)
- Postal code: 8511
- Dialing code: 0566

Goingarijp (West Frisian: Goaiïngaryp) is a small village in De Fryske Marren municipality in the province of Friesland, the Netherlands. It had a population of around 250 in 2017.

== History ==
The village was first mentioned in the 13th century as Godinriip, and means bank belonging to Goënga. The Protestant Church dates from 1770 and was a replacement of a medieval church. In 1840, it was home to 86 people. There is a little American windmill near the village. It used to stand in the Rottige Meente but was sold to the village in 2007.

Before 2014, Goingarijp was part of the Skarsterlân municipality and before 1984 it was part of Doniawerstal.

== Gallery ==
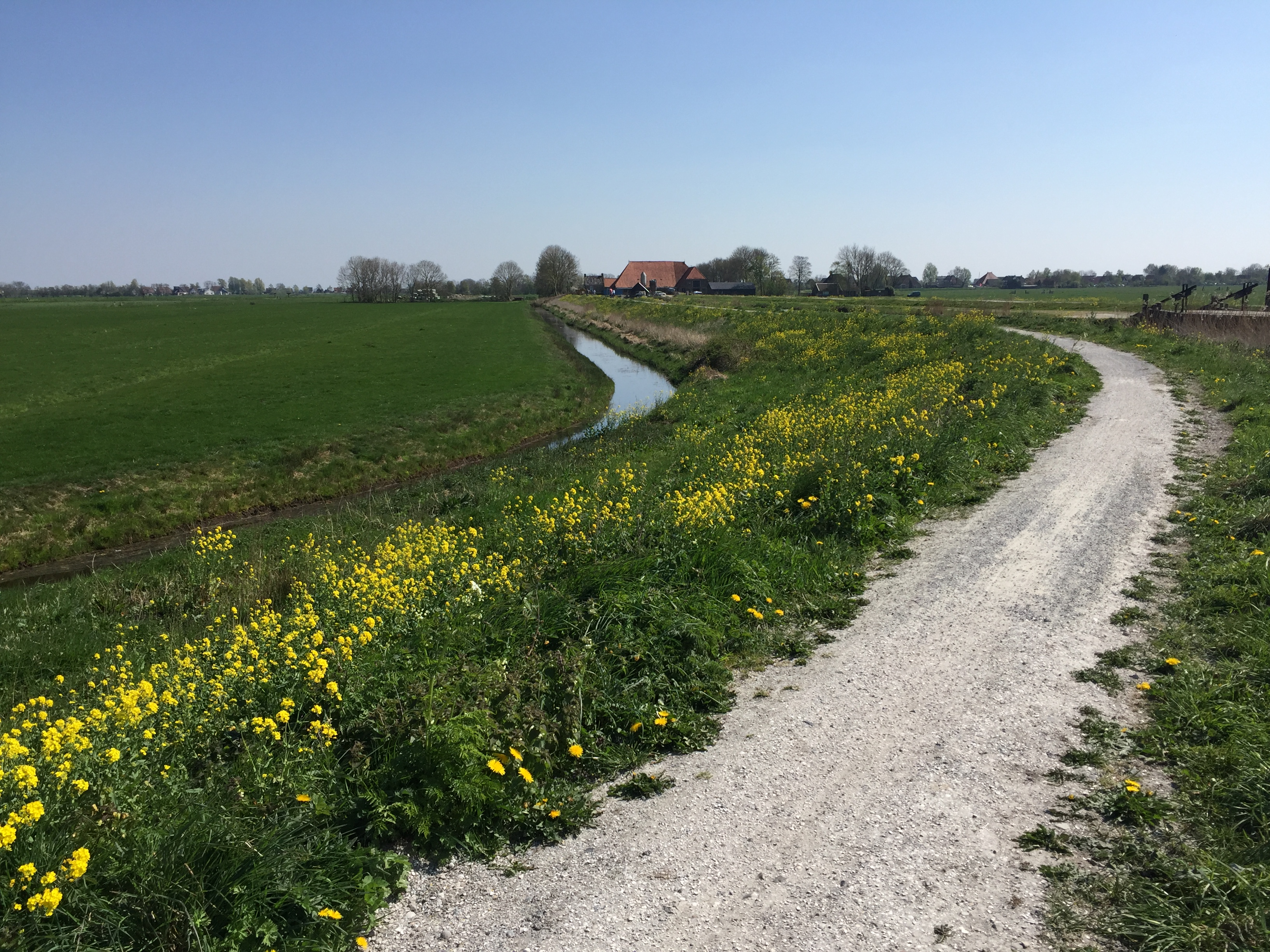
The dike at Goingarijp

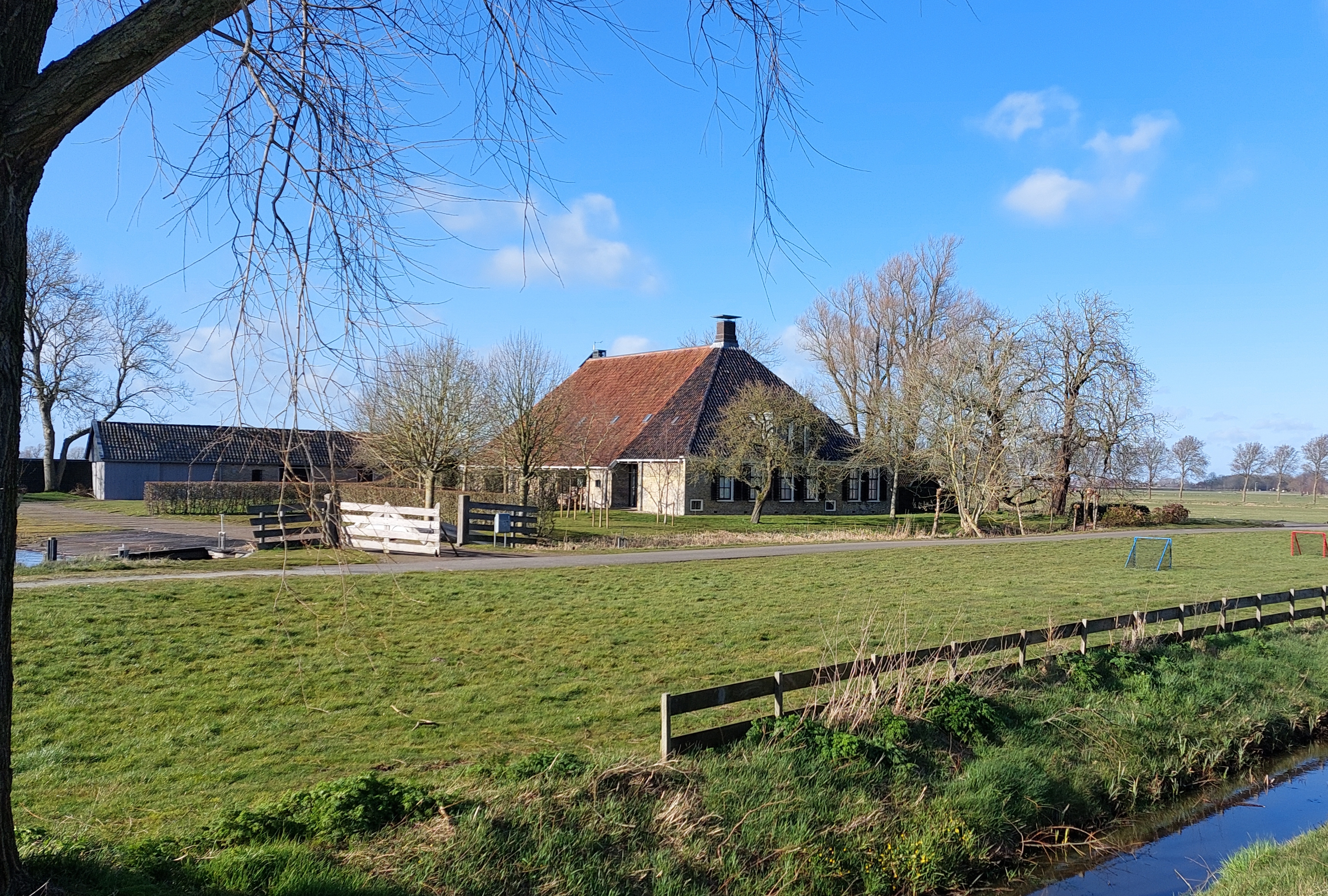
Farm near Goingarijp

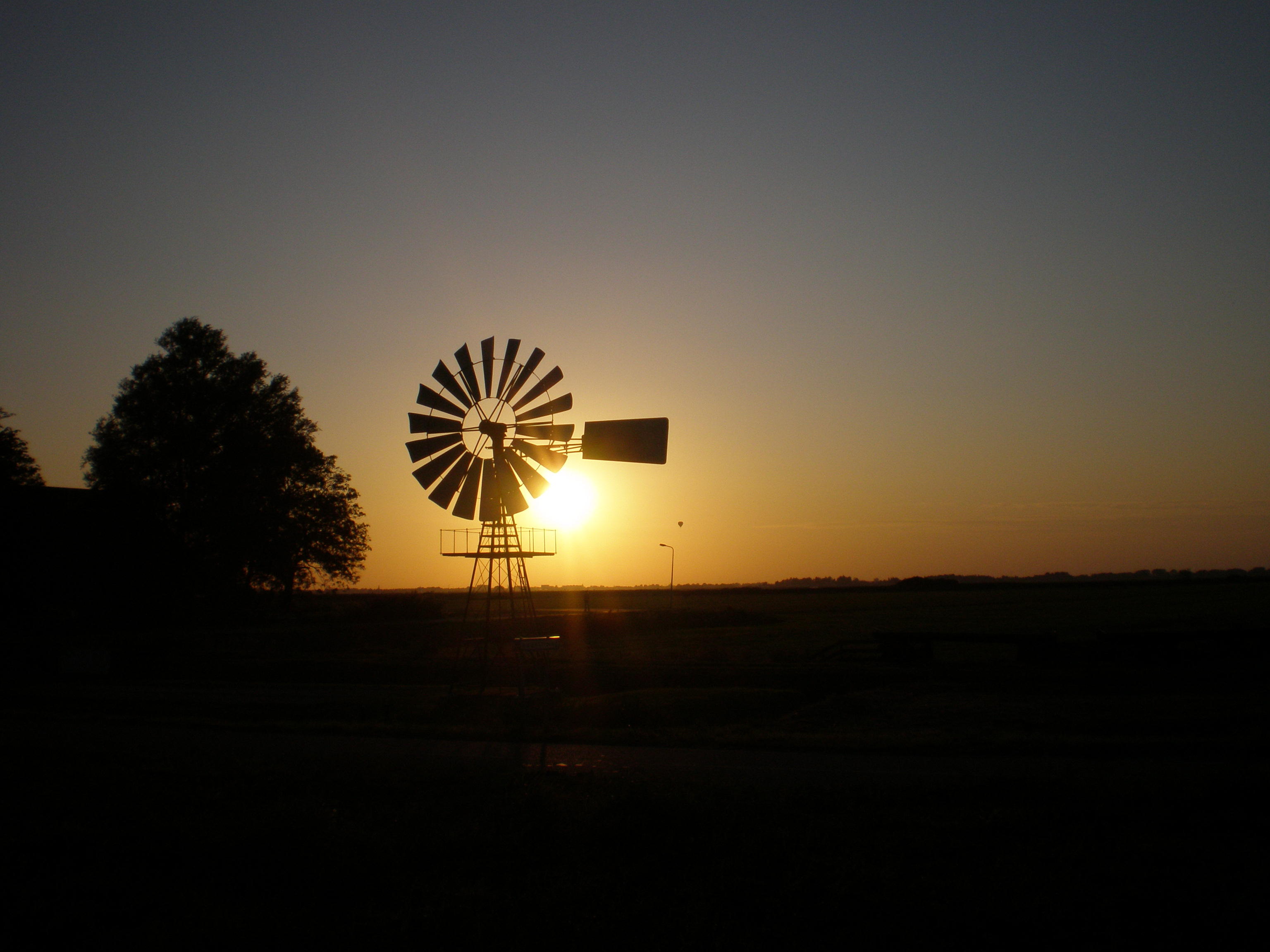
American wind mill during sunset

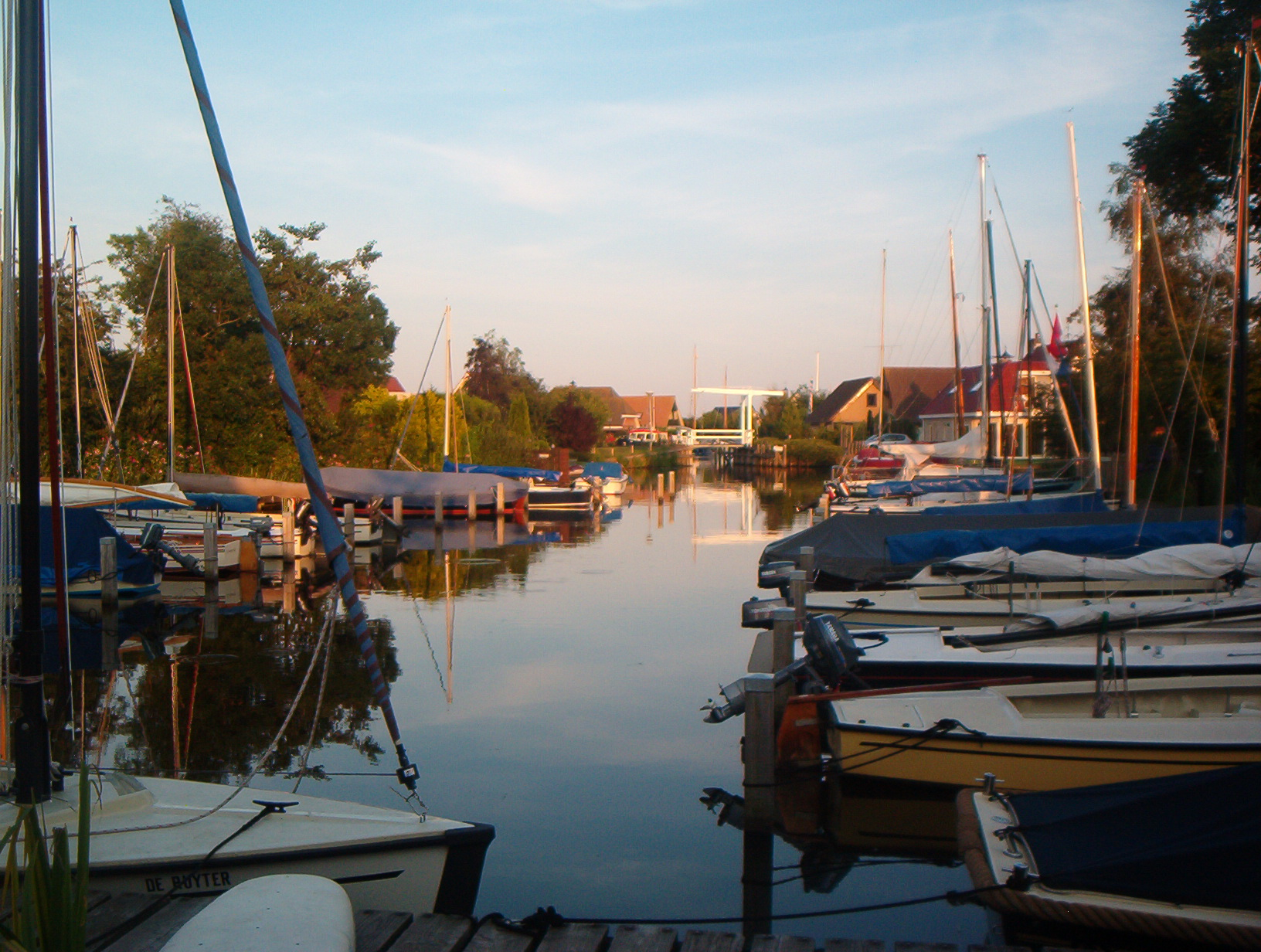
Harbour of the bungalow park
