= Broek, Friesland =

Broek De Broek
- Village
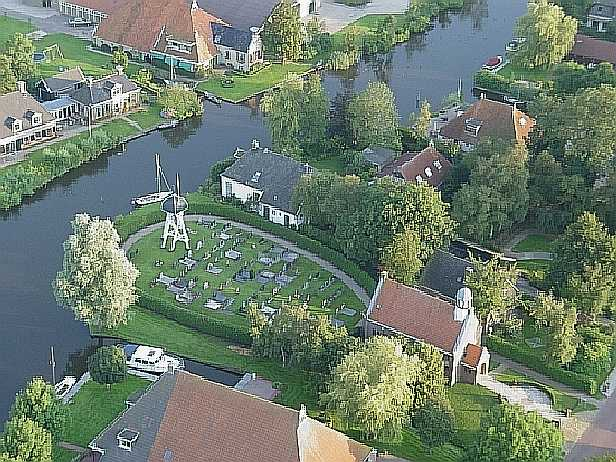
- Aerial view over Broek

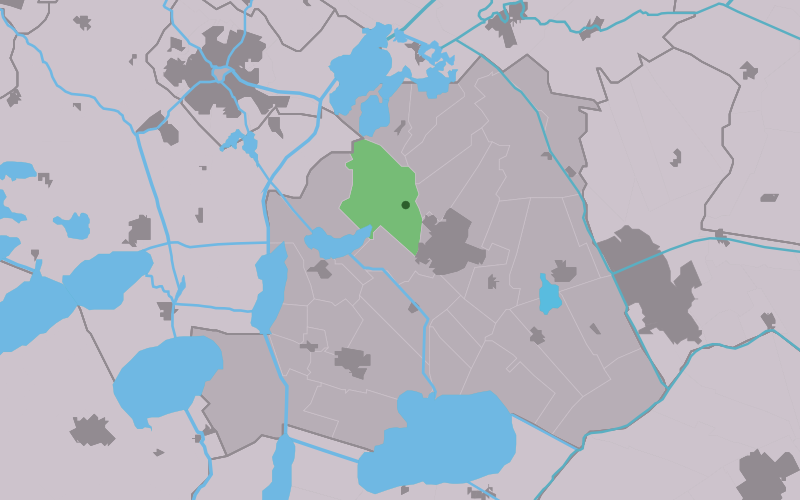
- Location in the former Skarsterlân municipality

- Location in the Netherlands Broek (Netherlands)
- Country: Netherlands
- Province: Friesland
- Municipality: De Fryske Marren

Area
  - Total: 10.33 km^{2} (3.99 sq mi)
- Elevation: −0.6 m (−2.0 ft)

Population (2021)
  - Total: 215
  - Density: 20.8/km^{2} (53.9/sq mi)
- Time zone: UTC+1 (CET)
  - Summer (DST): UTC+2 (CEST)
- Postal code: 8512
- Dialing code: 0513

Broek (West Frisian: De Broek) is a small village in De Fryske Marren in the province of Friesland, the Netherlands. It had a population of around 190 in 2017.

== History ==
The village was first mentioned in 1482 as Broech, and means "swampy land". Broek is a stretched out settlement, and the signs use Broek-Noord (north) and Broek-Zuid (south), because the two parts are not interconnected. In 1840, it was home to 158 people. The current church dates from 1913. Since 2014, it also functions as a village centre.

Before 2009, Broek was part of the Skarsterlân municipality and before 1984 it was part of Doniawerstal.

== Gallery ==
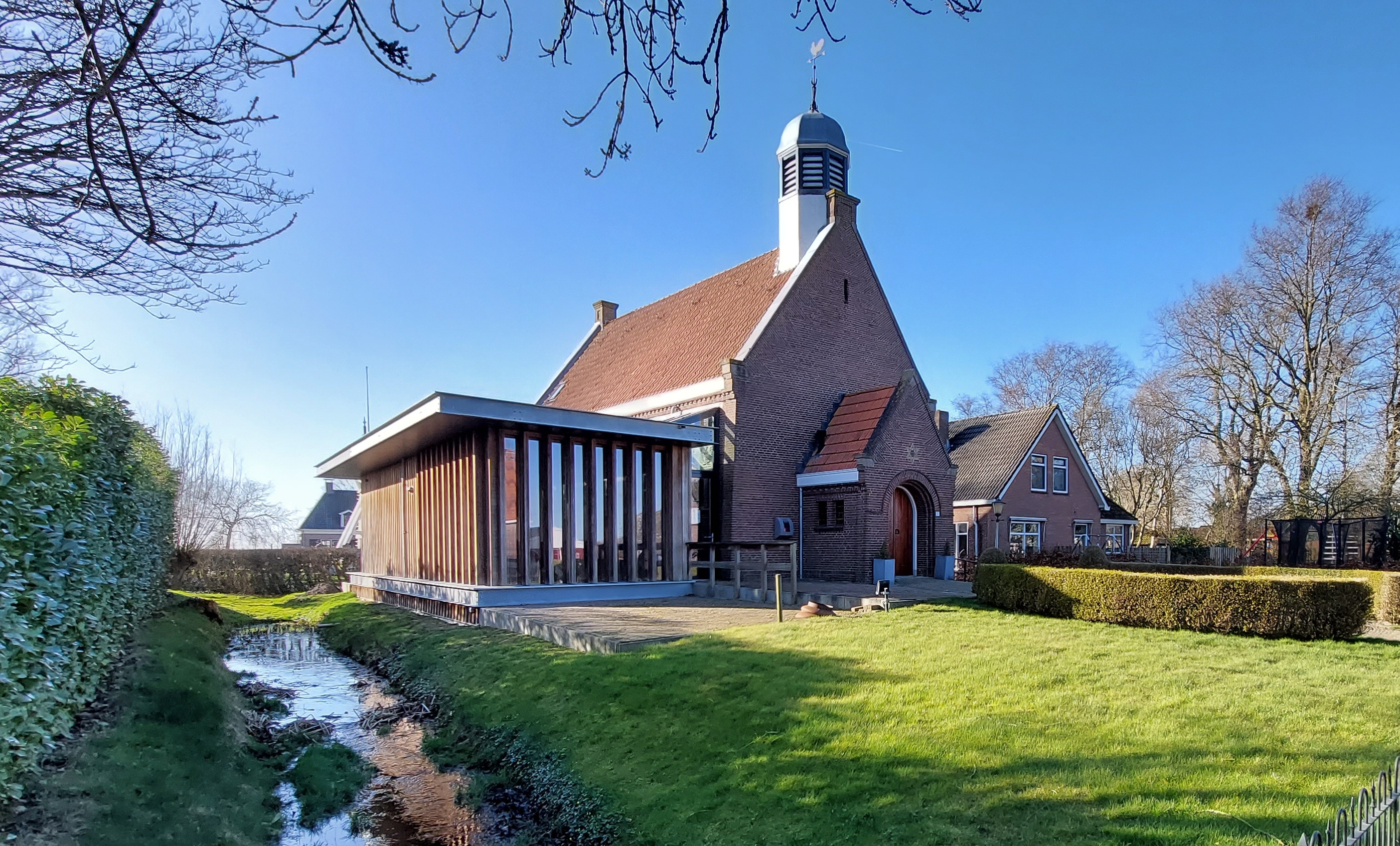
Church of Broek

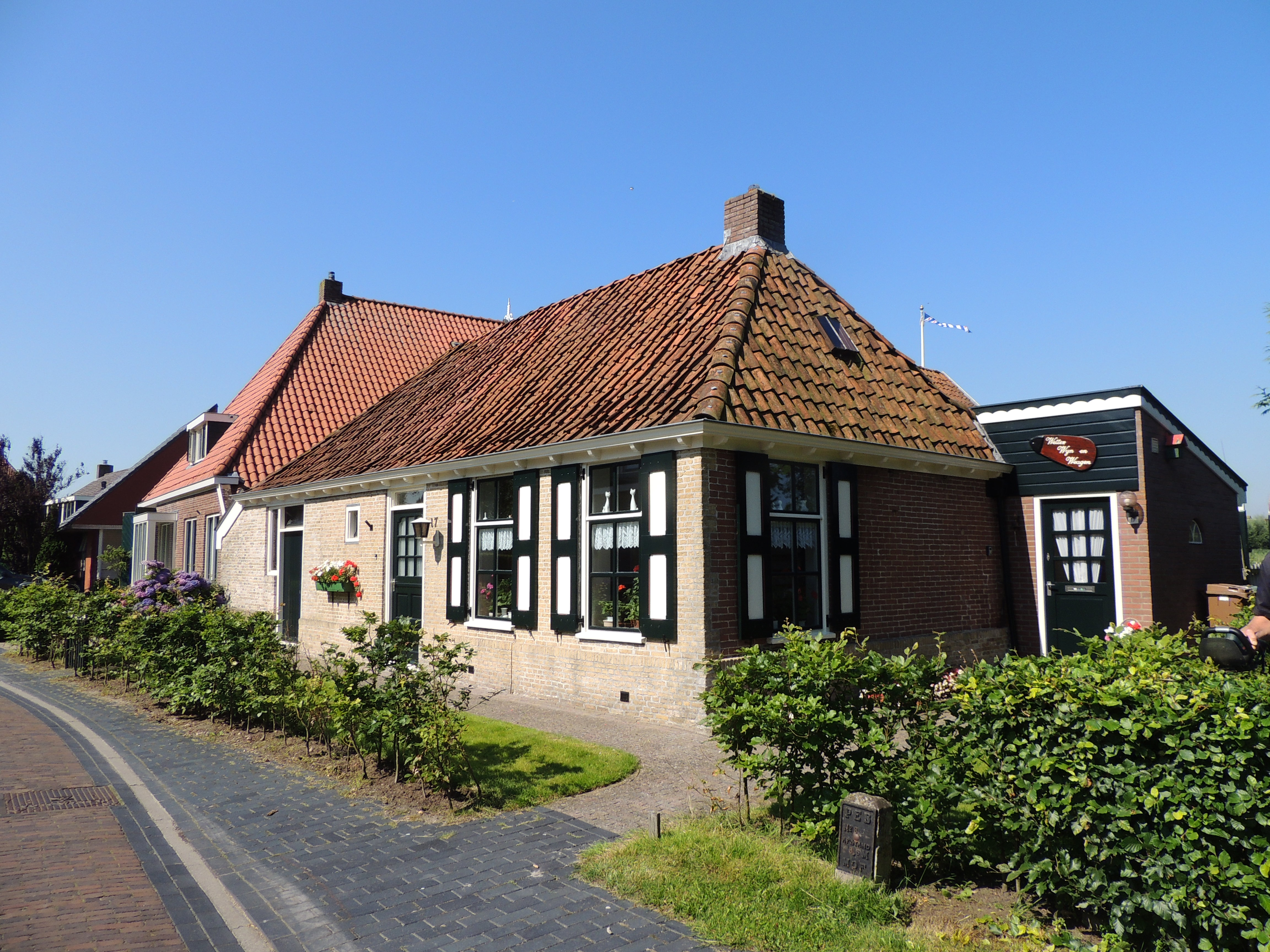
House in Broek

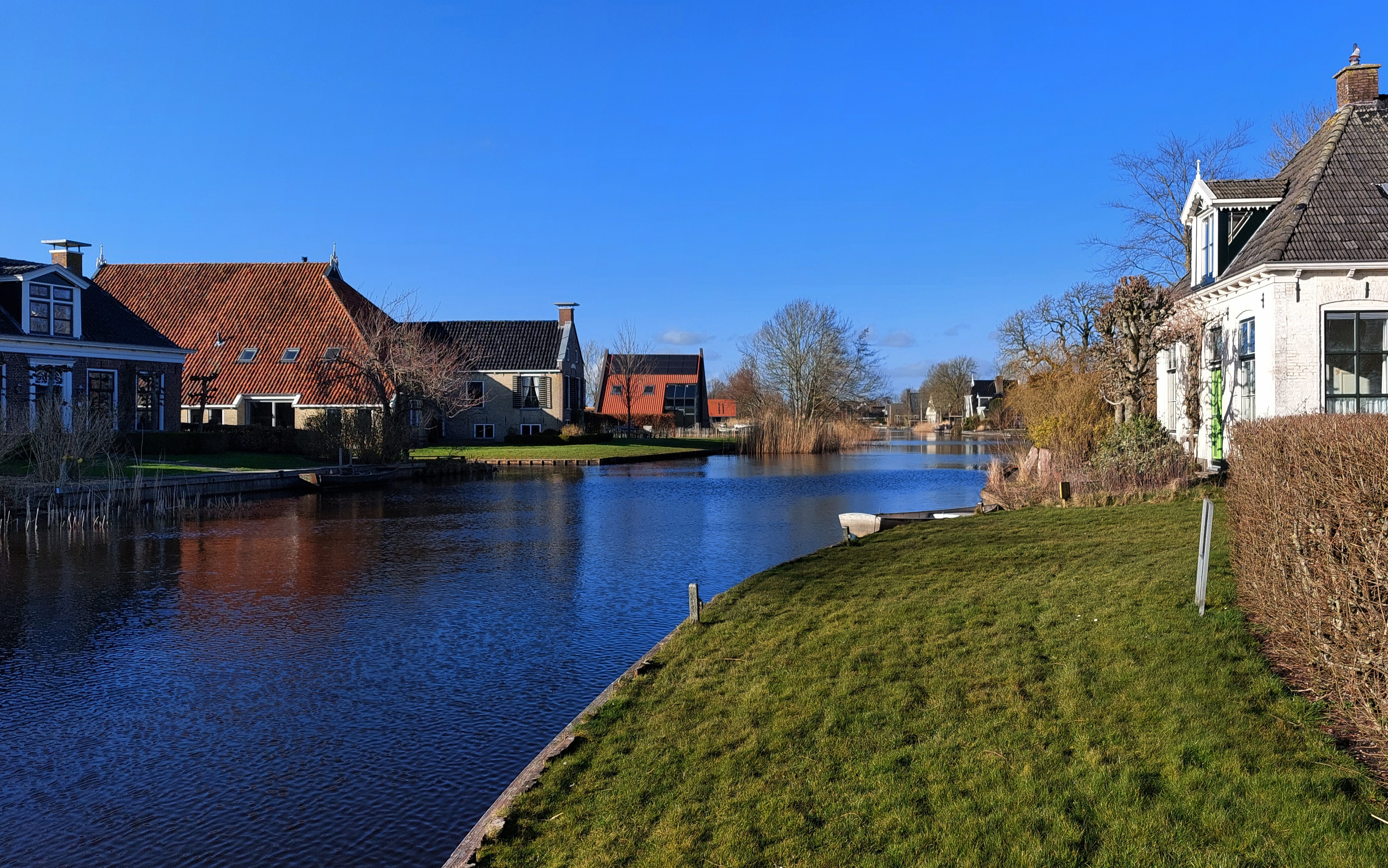
Canal view

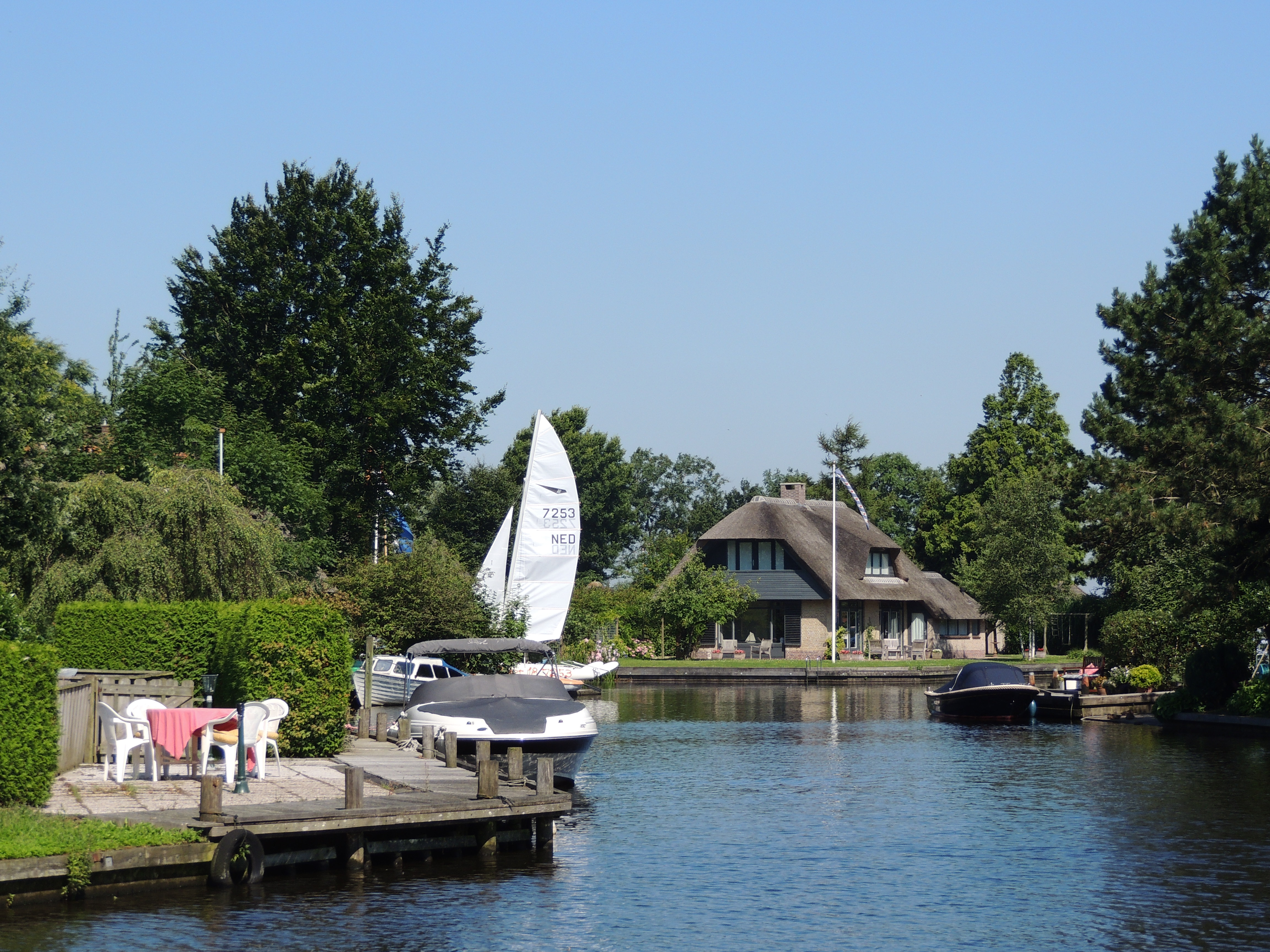
Villa in Broek
