= Oldeouwer =

Oldeouwer Alde Ouwer
- Village
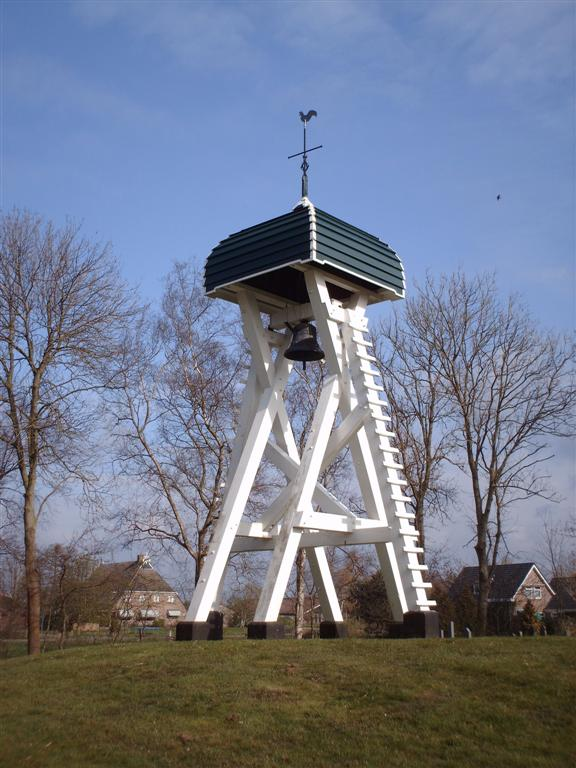
- Oldeouwer bell tower

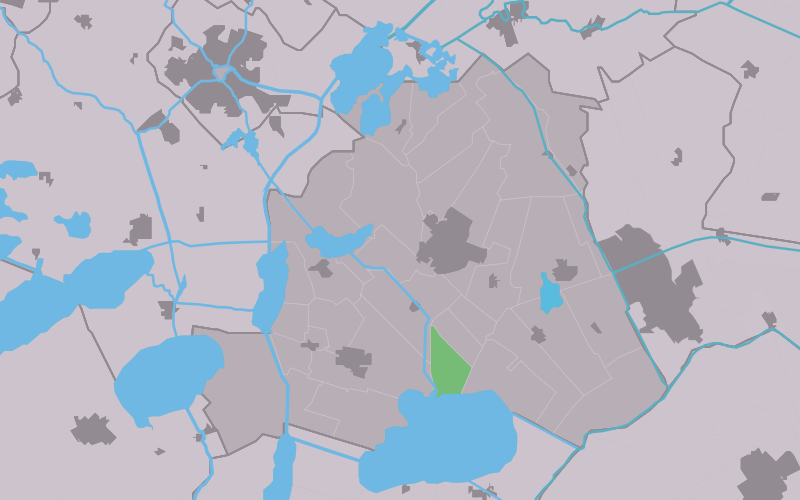
- Location in the former Skarsterlân municipality

- Location in the Netherlands Oldeouwer (Netherlands)
- Country: Netherlands
- Province: Friesland
- Municipality: De Fryske Marren

Area
  - Total: 8.76 km^{2} (3.38 sq mi)
- Elevation: −1.3 m (−4.3 ft)

Population (2021)
  - Total: 80
  - Density: 9.1/km^{2} (24/sq mi)
- Time zone: UTC+1 (CET)
  - Summer (DST): UTC+2 (CEST)
- Postal code: 8515
- Dialing code: 0513

Oldeouwer (West Frisian: Alde Ouwer) is a village in De Fryske Marren municipality in the province of Friesland, the Netherlands. It had a population of around 85 in 2017.

== History ==
It was first mentioned in the 13th century as Antiqua huer, and means "old bank". In 1840, it was home to 46 people.

Before 2014, Oldeouwer was part of the Skarsterlân municipality and before 1984 it was part of Doniawerstal.
