= Ouwster-Nijega =

Ouwster-Nijega Ousternijegea
- Village
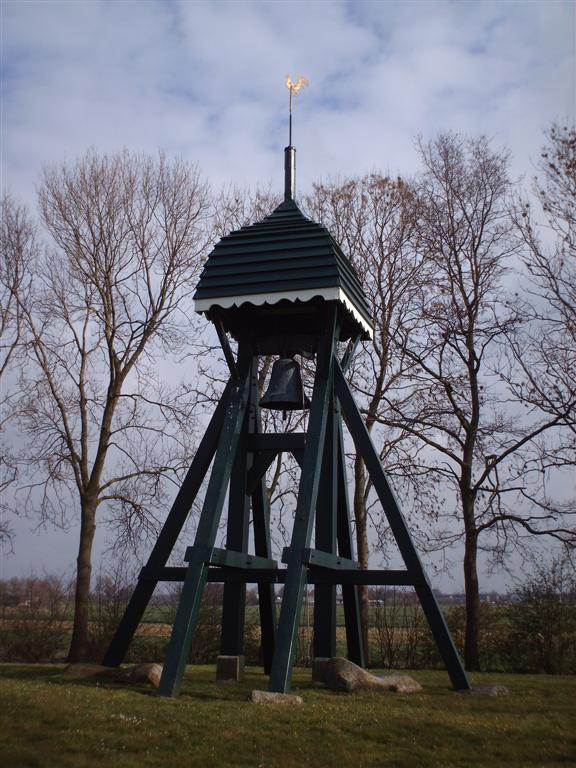
- Ouwster Nijega bell tower

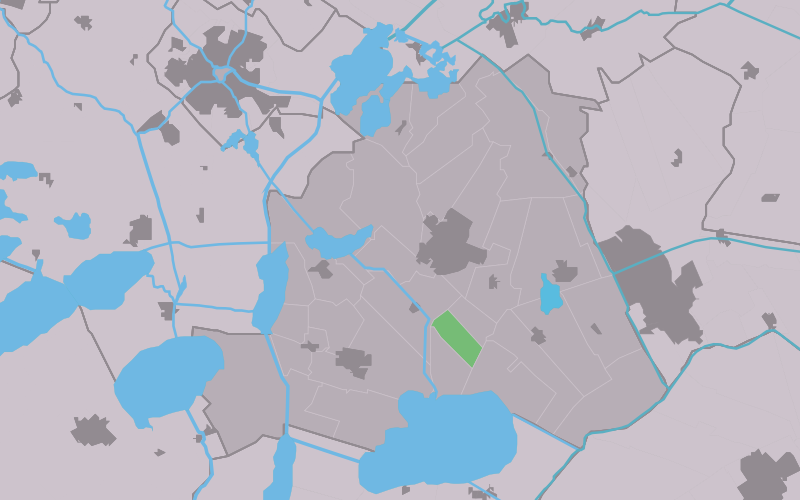
- Location in the former Skarsterlân municipality

- Location in the Netherlands Ouwster-Nijega (Netherlands)
- Country: Netherlands
- Province: Friesland
- Municipality: De Fryske Marren

Area
  - Total: 2.03 km^{2} (0.78 sq mi)
- Elevation: −1.2 m (−3.9 ft)

Population (2021)
  - Total: 85
  - Density: 42/km^{2} (110/sq mi)
- Time zone: UTC+1 (CET)
  - Summer (DST): UTC+2 (CEST)
- Postal code: 8514
- Dialing code: 0513

Ouwster-Nijega (West Frisian: Ousternijegea) is a village in De Fryske Marren in the province of Friesland, the Netherlands. It had a population of around 85 in 2017.

== History ==
The village was first mentioned in 1505 as Oester Nyegae, and means new village in the Ouwer region. In 1840, it was home to 29 people.

Before 2014, Ouwster-Nijega was part of the Skarsterlân municipality and before 1984 it was part of Doniawerstal.
