= Dijken =

Dijken Diken
- Village
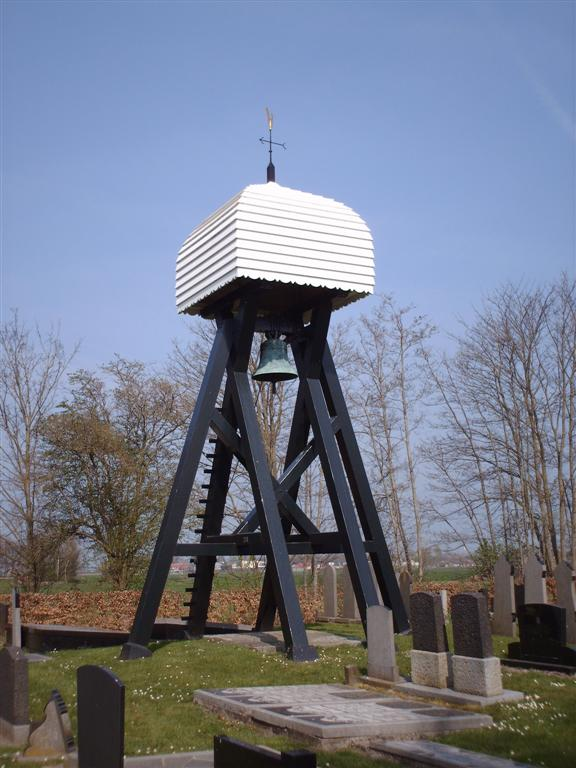
- Bell tower of Dijken

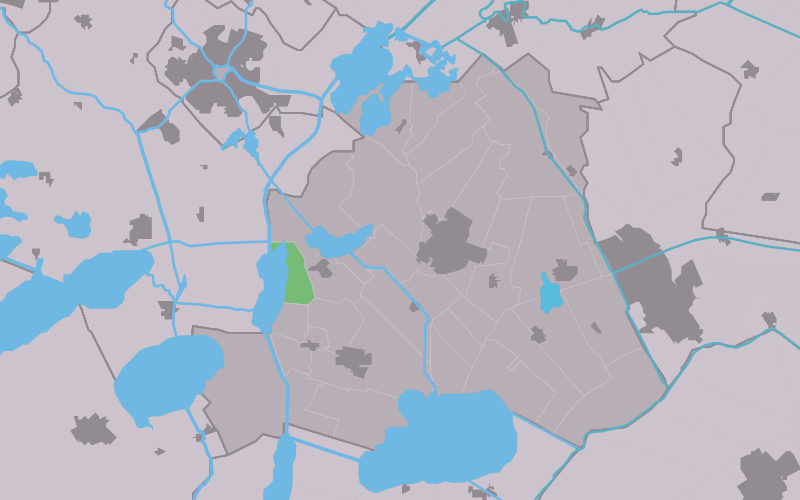
- Location in the former Skarsterlân municipality

- Location in the Netherlands Dijken (Netherlands)
- Country: Netherlands
- Province: Friesland
- Municipality: De Fryske Marren

Area
  - Total: 4.74 km^{2} (1.83 sq mi)
- Elevation: −0.1 m (−0.33 ft)

Population (2021)
  - Total: 55
  - Density: 12/km^{2} (30/sq mi)
- Time zone: UTC+1 (CET)
  - Summer (DST): UTC+2 (CEST)
- Postal code: 8528
- Dialing code: 0513

Dijken (West Frisian: Diken) is a small village in De Fryske Marren in the province of Friesland, the Netherlands. It had a population of around 65 in 2017.

== History ==
It was first mentioned in 1505 as "In de Dijcken", and means dikes. Dijken used to have a church, but it was already in bad condition in 1650. In 1720, it was a ruin. The belfry remained, but was stolen by the Germans in 1944. In 1984, the belfry was rebuilt. In 1840, it was home to 70 people. Dijken is one of the few settlements in the Netherlands without street names, and the houses and farms are identified by just a number.

Before 2009, Dijken was part of the Skarsterlân municipality and before 1984 it was part of Doniawerstal.
