= Legemeer =

Legemeer Legemar
- Village
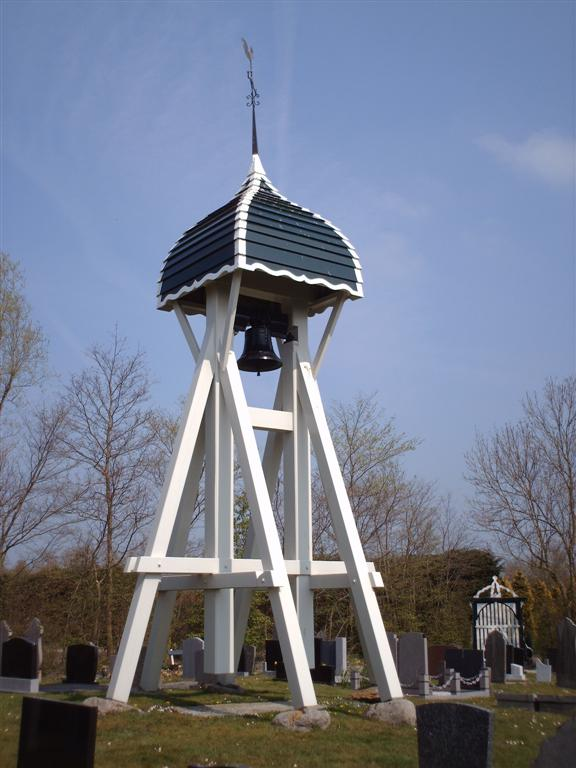
- Legemeer bell tower

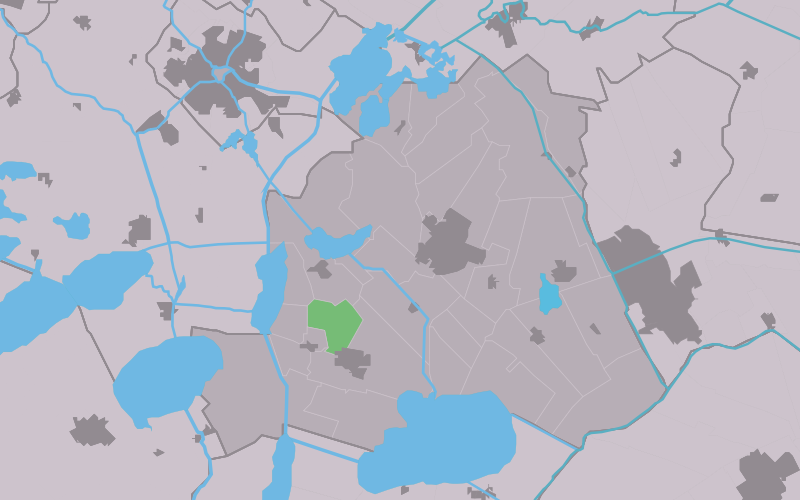
- Location in the former Skarsterlân municipality

- Location in the Netherlands Legemeer (Netherlands)
- Country: Netherlands
- Province: Friesland
- Municipality: De Fryske Marren

Area
  - Total: 2.97 km^{2} (1.15 sq mi)
- Elevation: 0.9 m (3.0 ft)

Population (2021)
  - Total: 40
  - Density: 13/km^{2} (35/sq mi)
- Time zone: UTC+1 (CET)
  - Summer (DST): UTC+2 (CEST)
- Postal code: 8527
- Dialing code: 0513

Legemeer (West Frisian: Legemar) is a village in De Fryske Marren in the province of Friesland, the Netherlands. It had a population of around 40 in 2017.

== History ==
It was first mentioned in the 13th century as Nouimeis. Legemeer means "low lying lake". A church was mentioned in 1788, but no longer exists. The belfry was built in 1720 and replaced in 1972 after it was destroyed in a storm. In 1840, was home to 58 people.

Before 2014, Legemeer was part of the Skarsterlân municipality and before 1984 it was part of Doniawerstal.
