= Teroele =

- Village
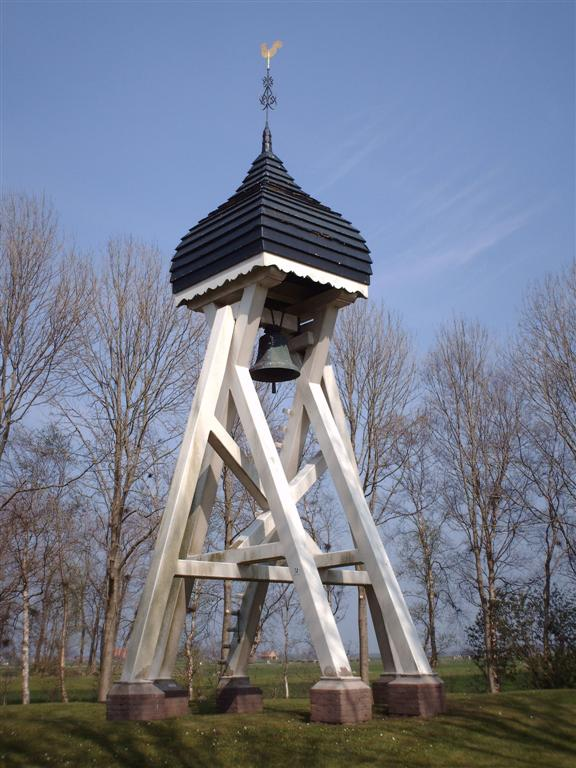
- Teroele wooden bell tower

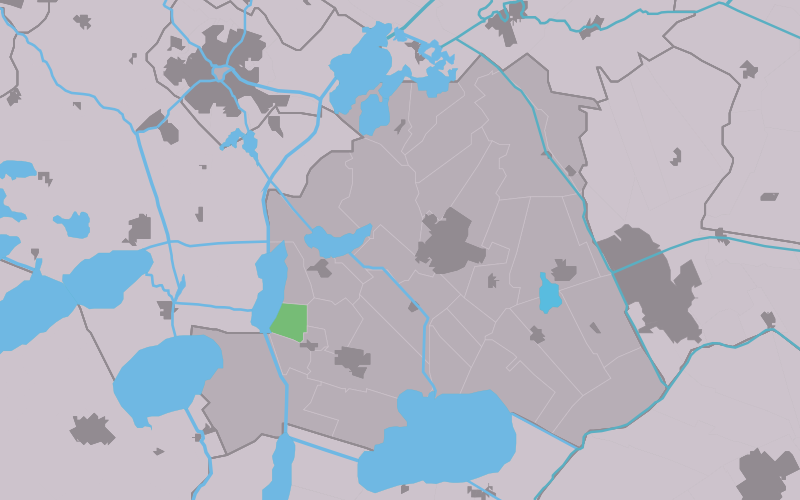
- Location in the former Skarsterlân municipality

- Location in the Netherlands Teroele (Netherlands)
- Country: Netherlands
- Province: Friesland
- Municipality: De Fryske Marren

Area
  - Total: 2.91 km^{2} (1.12 sq mi)
- Elevation: 0.0 m (0 ft)

Population (2021)
  - Total: 25
  - Density: 8.6/km^{2} (22/sq mi)
- Time zone: UTC+1 (CET)
  - Summer (DST): UTC+2 (CEST)
- Postal code: 8524
- Dialing code: 0513

Teroele is a village in De Fryske Marren in the province of Friesland, the Netherlands. It had a population of around 20 in 2017.

== History ==
The village was first mentioned in 1482 as Olis, and means land on water. The bell tower dates from 1723. The church was demolished in the 17th church. In 1840, it was home to 72 people.

Before 2014, Teroele was part of the Skarsterlân municipality and before 1984 it was part of Doniawerstal.
