= Doniaga =

Doniaga Dunegea
- Village
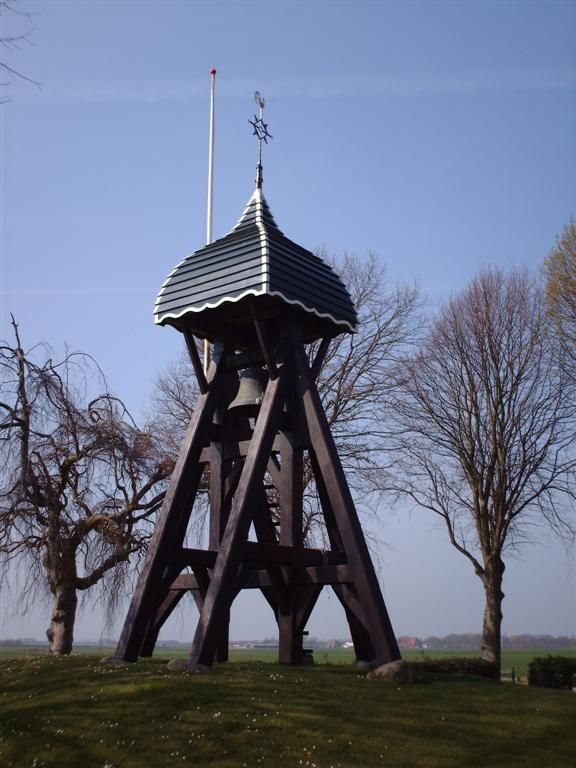
- Bell tower of Doniaga

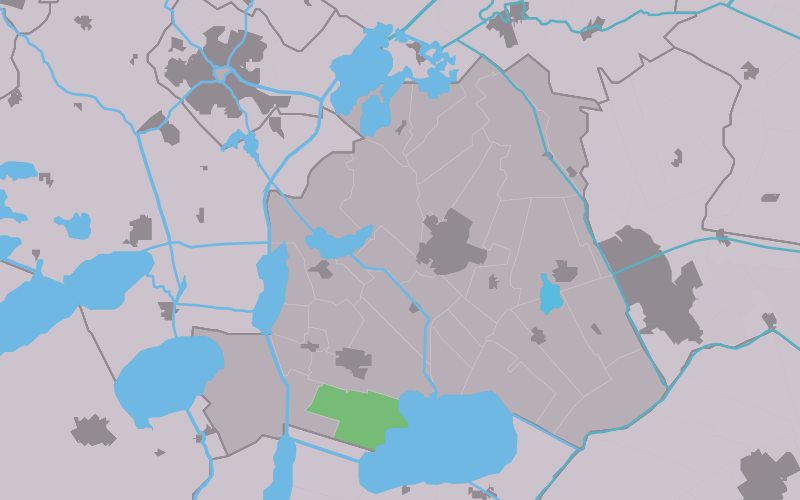
- Location in De Friese Meren municipality

- Location in the Netherlands Doniaga (Netherlands)
- Country: Netherlands
- Province: Friesland
- Municipality: De Fryske Marren

Area
  - Total: 6.84 km^{2} (2.64 sq mi)
- Elevation: −0.2 m (−0.66 ft)

Population (2021)
  - Total: 85
  - Density: 12/km^{2} (32/sq mi)
- Time zone: UTC+1 (CET)
  - Summer (DST): UTC+2 (CEST)
- Postal code: 8516
- Dialing code: 0513

Doniaga (West Frisian: Dunegea) is a small village in De Fryske Marren municipality in the province Friesland of the Netherlands and has around 100 citizens (2017).

It is located west of the Tjeukemeer and named after the Donia family.

== History ==
The village was first mentioned in 1448 as Doyenga. In 1840, it was home to 104 people. It used to have a little village centre with a school, inn, church and library, but only the belfry remains. The church was demolished in the 19th century. The belfry dates from 1901.

Before 2009, Doniaga was part of the Skarsterlân municipality and before 1984 it was part of Doniawerstal.

== Gallery ==
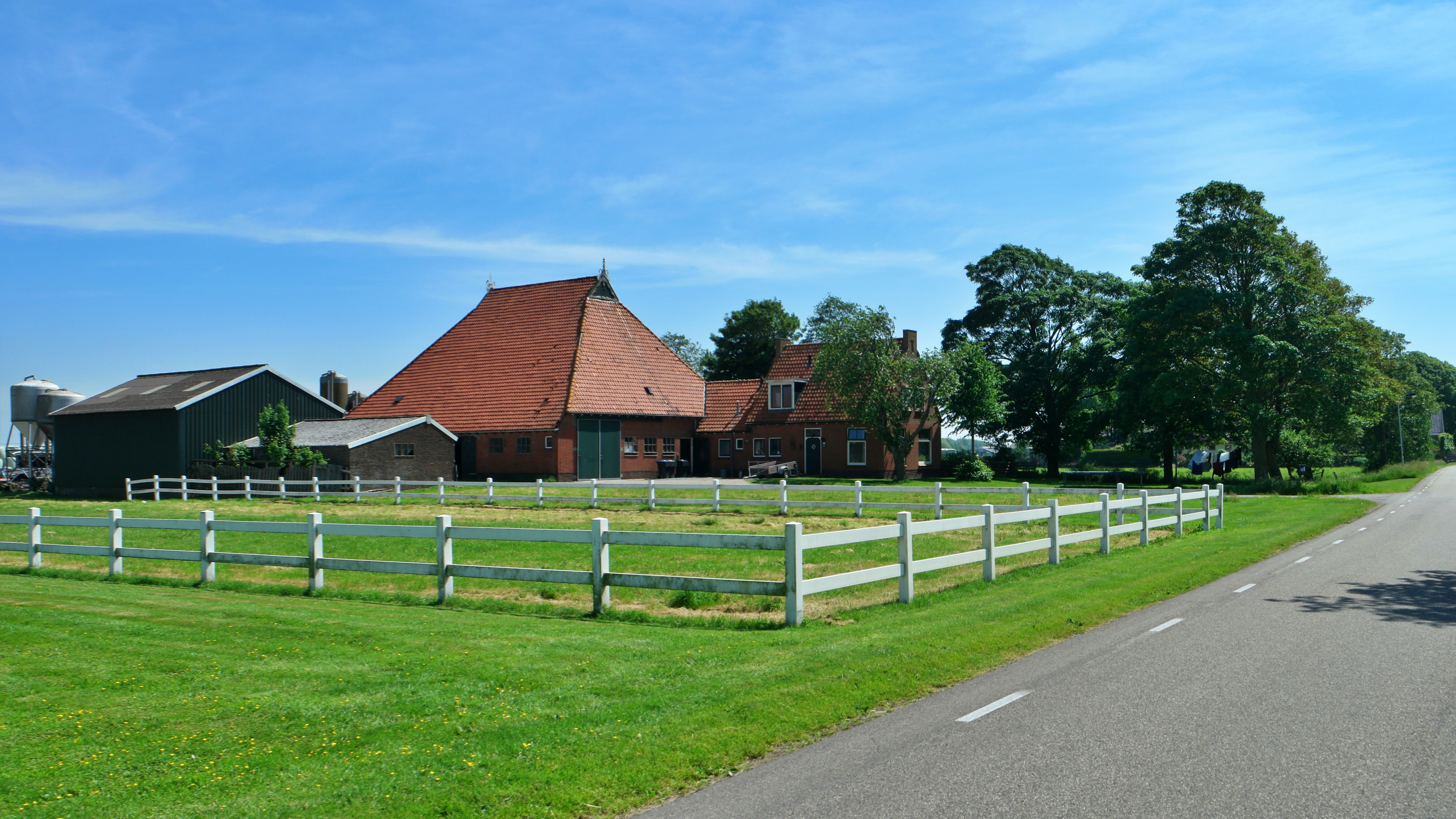
Farm in Doniaga

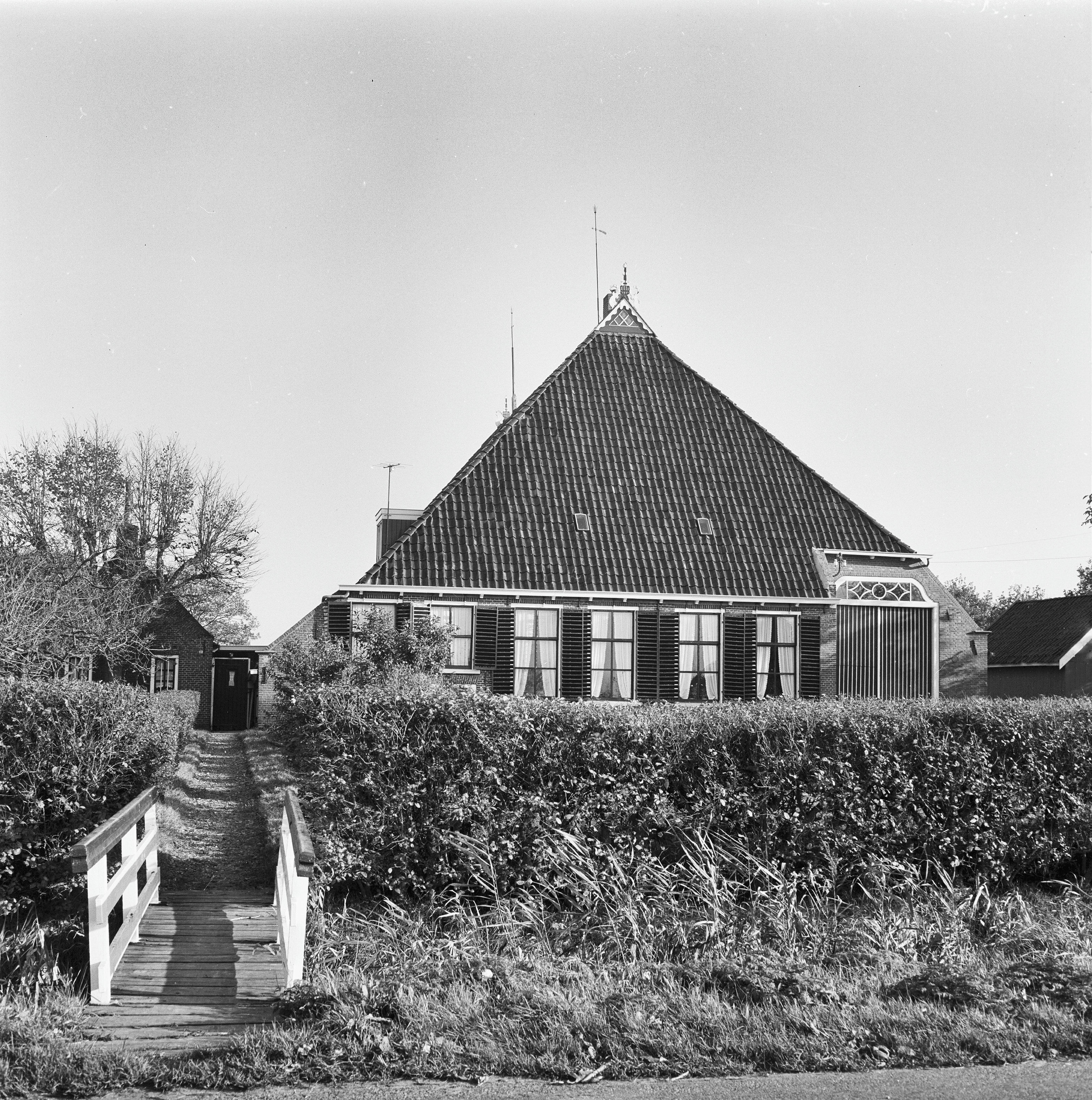
Farm in Doniaga

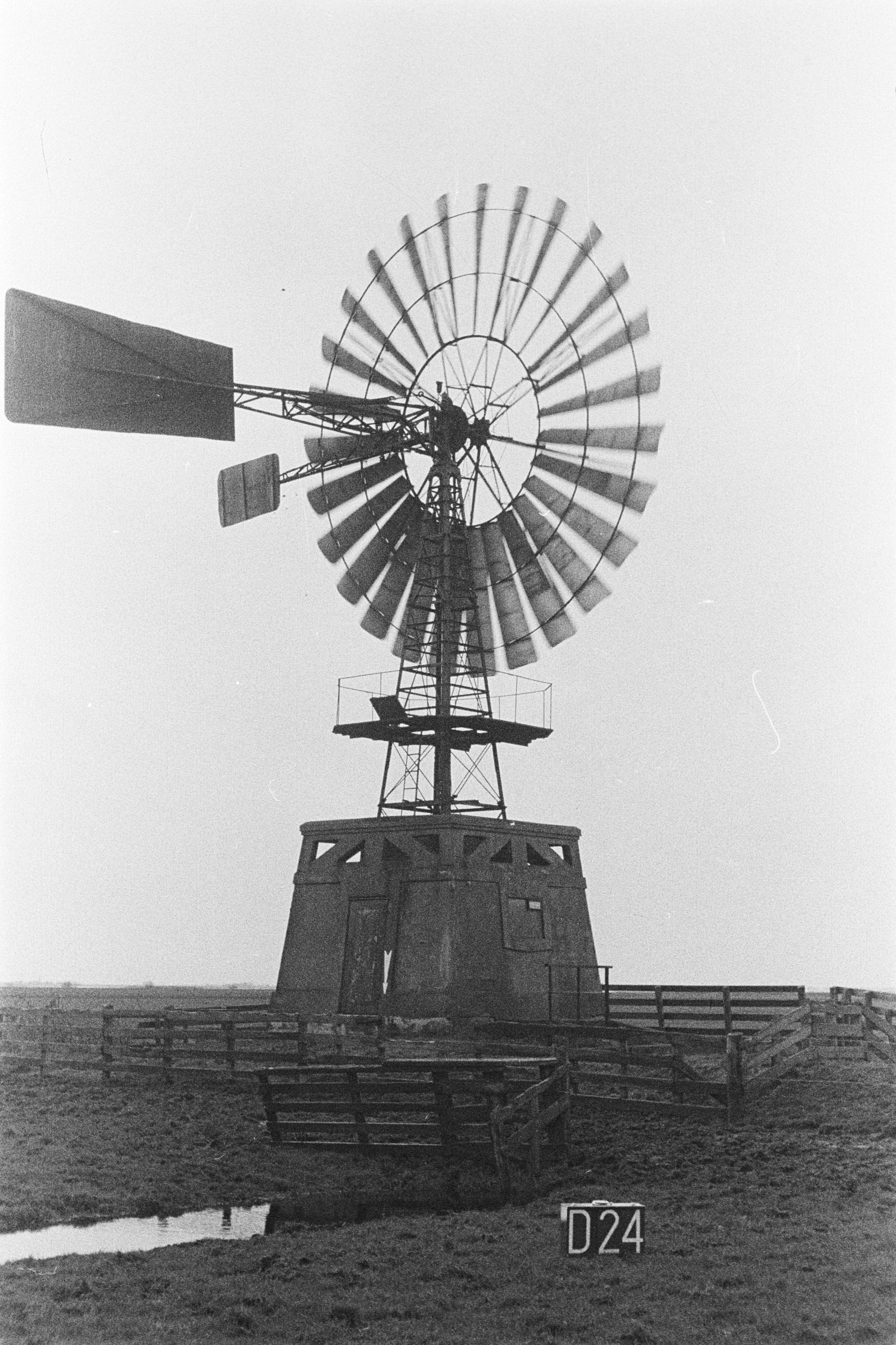
American wind mill (1955)
