= Elahuizen =

Elahuizen Ealahuzen
- Village
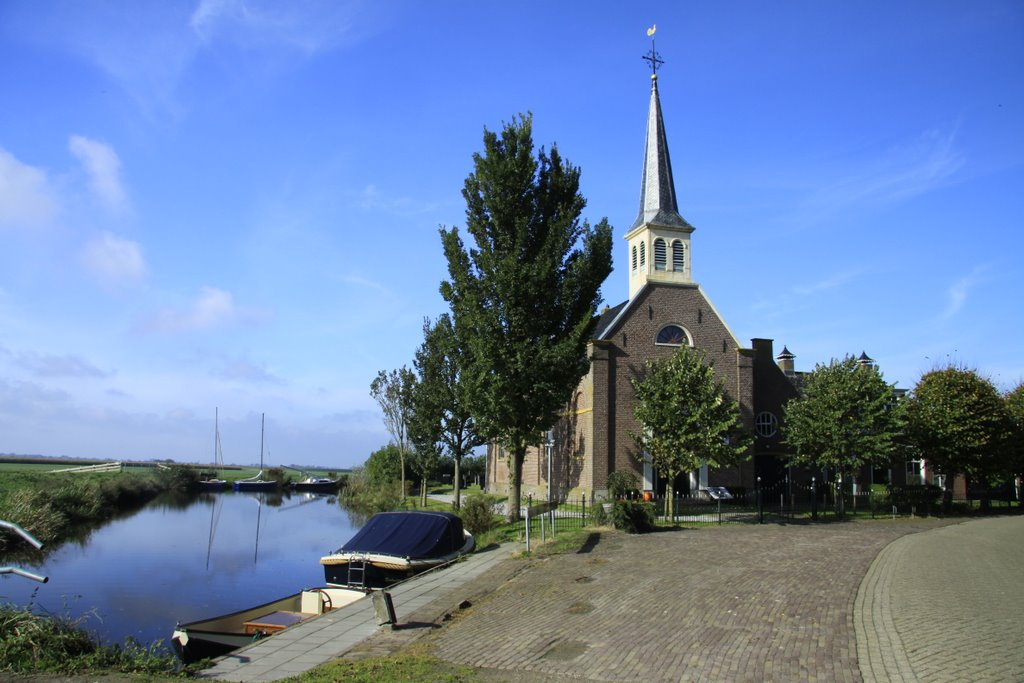
- Elahuizen Church

- Coat of arms

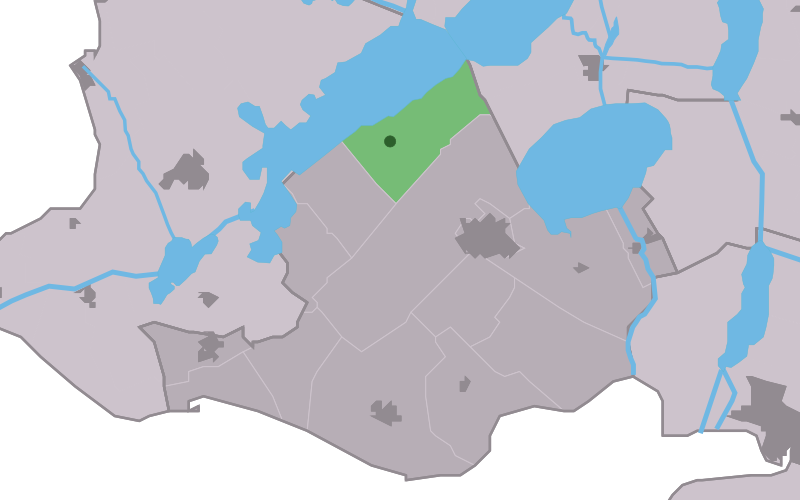
- Location in the former Gaasterlân Sleat municipality

- Location in the Netherlands Elahuizen (Netherlands)
- Country: Netherlands
- Province: Friesland
- Municipality: De Fryske Marren

Area
  - Total: 10.28 km^{2} (3.97 sq mi)
- Elevation: −0.8 m (−2.6 ft)

Population (2021)
  - Total: 360
  - Density: 35/km^{2} (91/sq mi)
- Time zone: UTC+1 (CET)
  - Summer (DST): UTC+2 (CEST)
- Postal code: 8581
- Dialing code: 0514

Elahuizen (West Frisian: Ealahuzen) is a small village in De Fryske Marren municipality in the province of Friesland, the Netherlands. It is located on the banks of the Fluessen and had a population of around 345 in 2017.

== History ==
The village was first mentioned in 1412 as Elahuysen, and means "settlement of Ele (person)". The original settlement was flooded in the Fluessen around 1700, and only a handful of farms and houses on the dike remained.

The village was originally called Nijega. To avoid confusion with to other villages of the same name, it took the name of "Nijega (H.O.N.)" and later Elahuizen. Before 2014, Elahuizen was part of the Gaasterlân-Sleat municipality and before 1984 it belonged to Hemelumer Oldeferd which was named Hemelumer Oldephaert & Noordwolde (H.O.N.). before 1956.

In 1840, it was home to 285 people. The medieval church was demolished in 1857. In 1864, the church was struck by lightning and both church and tower burnt down, and had to be replaced again.

== Gallery ==
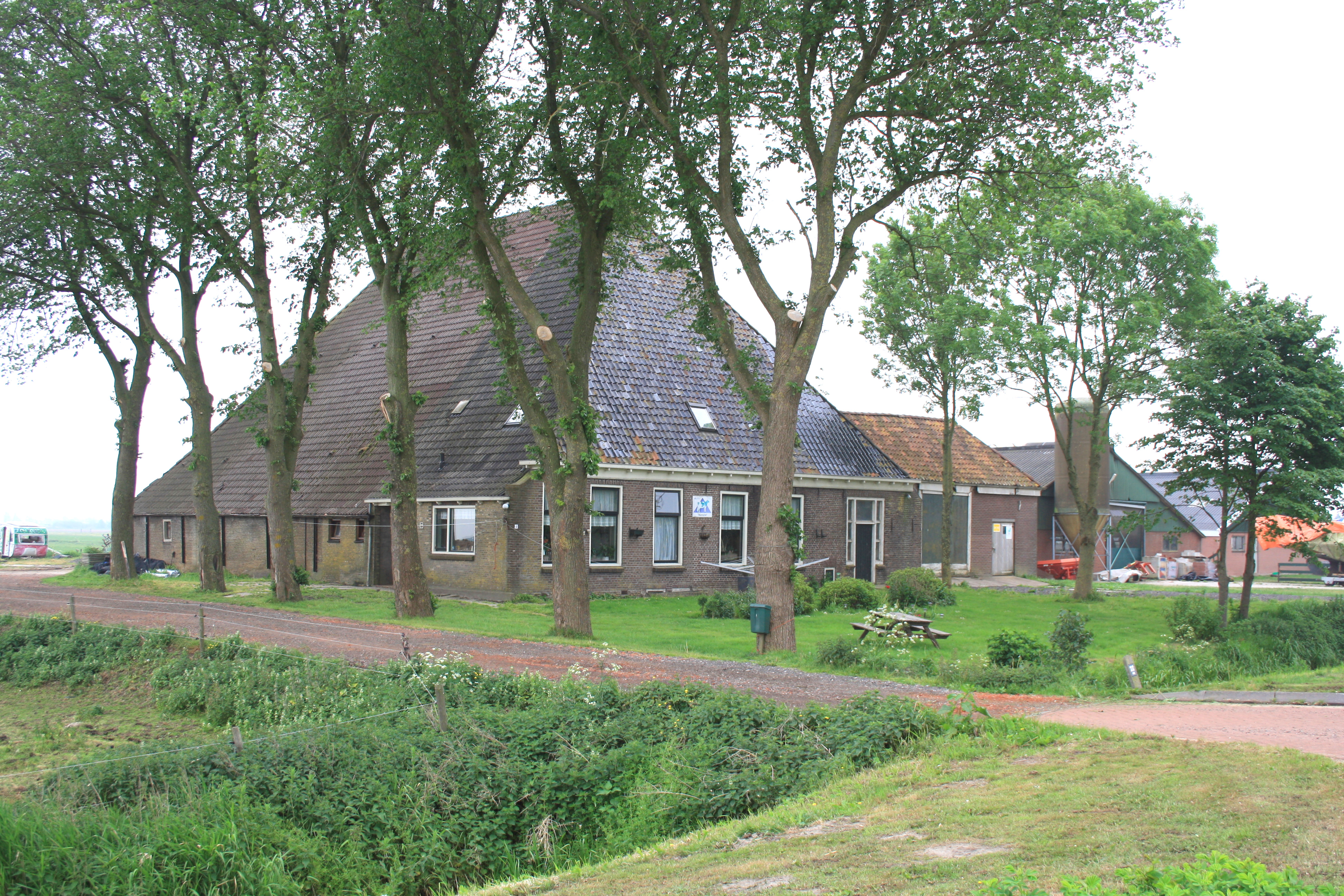
Farm in Elahuizen

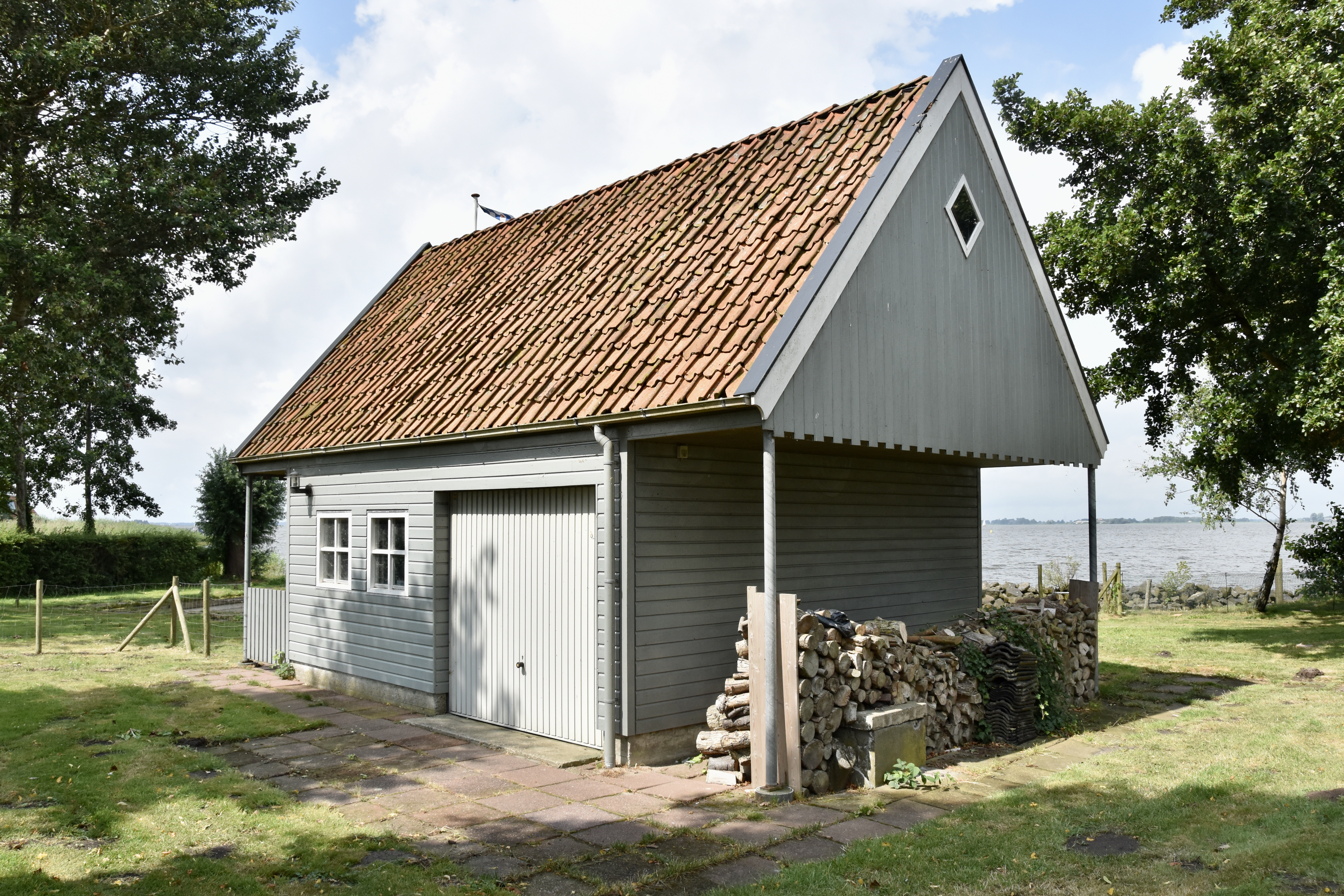
Shed in Elahuizen

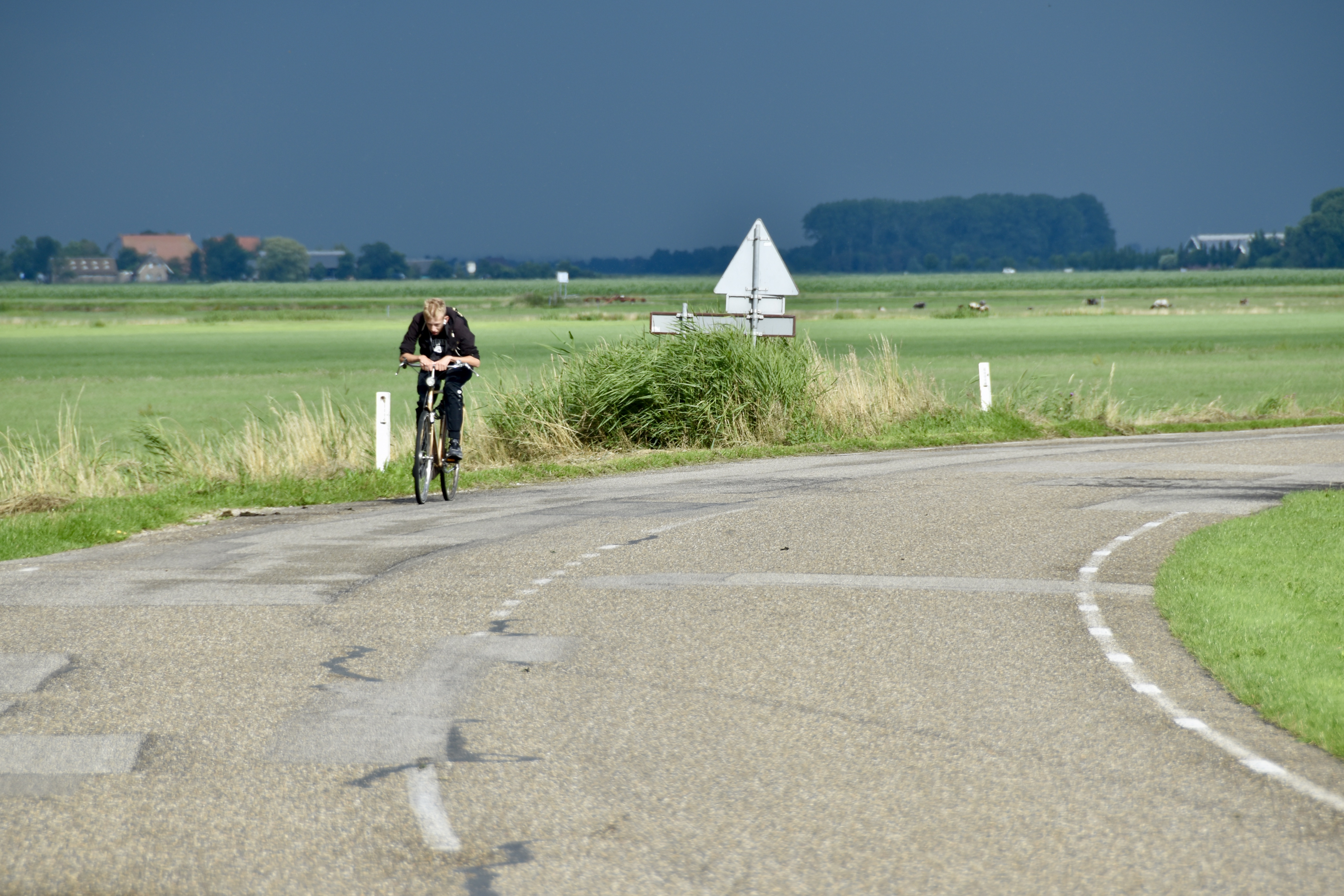
View on Elahuizen

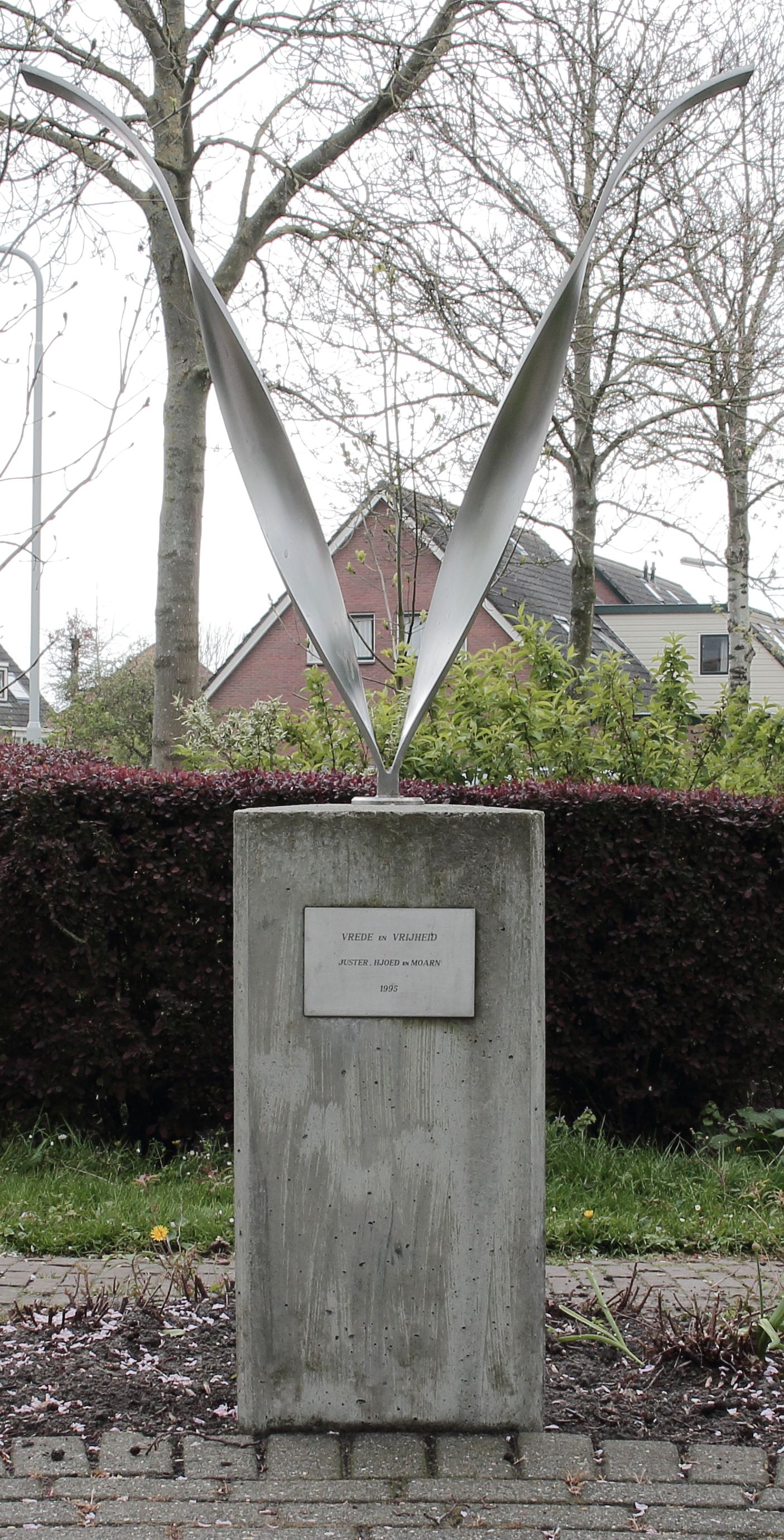
Peace monument
