= Ruigahuizen =

Ruigahuizen Rûgehuzen
- Village
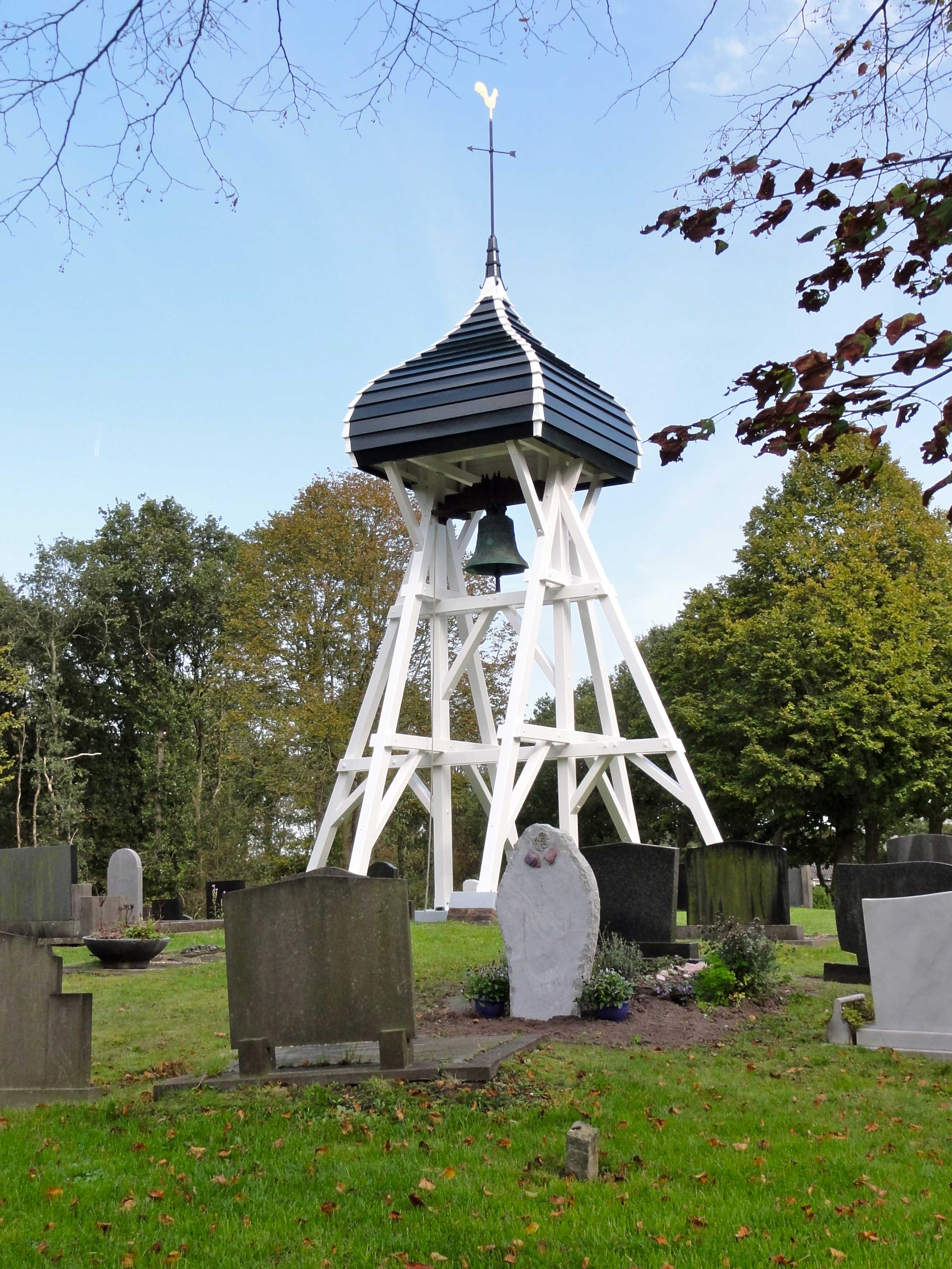
- Ruigahuizen wooden bell tower

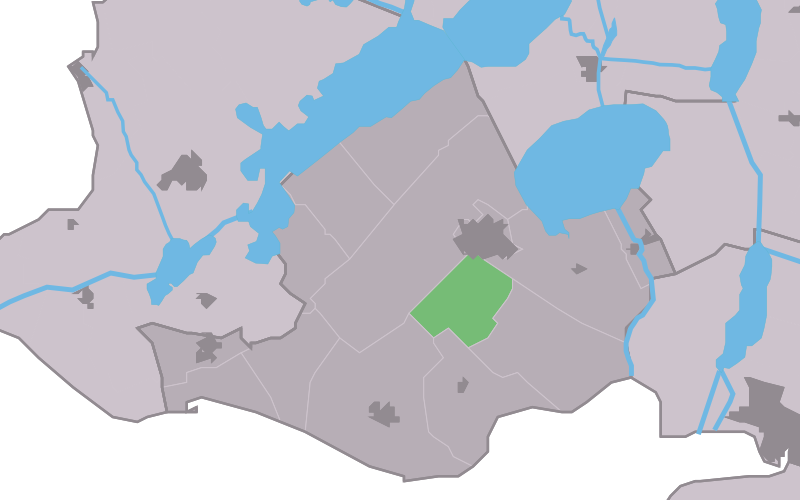
- Location in the former Gaasterlân Sleat municipality

- Location in the Netherlands Ruigahuizen (Netherlands)
- Country: Netherlands
- Province: Friesland
- Municipality: De Fryske Marren

Area
  - Total: 4.34 km^{2} (1.68 sq mi)
- Elevation: 0.5 m (1.6 ft)

Population (2021)
  - Total: 115
  - Density: 26.5/km^{2} (68.6/sq mi)
- Time zone: UTC+1 (CET)
  - Summer (DST): UTC+2 (CEST)
- Postal code: 8564
- Dialing code: 0514

Ruigahuizen (West Frisian: Rûgehuzen) is a small village in De Fryske Marren municipality in the province of Friesland, the Netherlands, south-west of Balk. It had a population of around 120 in 2017.

One of Frieslands' wooden bell towers is at the cemetery. In a farmyard at the Rûchsterwei, there is an American wind engine.

== History ==
The village was first mentioned between 1243 and 1254 as Rughahusem. It either means settlement near rough/wild land or settlement of Roege (person). A church was references as early as 1421, however it was demolished in the 18th century leaving only the bell tower. The tower was replaced in 1920. In 1840, Ruigahuizen was home to 32 people.

Before 2014, Ruigahuizen was part of the Gaasterlân-Sleat municipality, and before 1984 it was part of Gaasterland.

== Gallery ==
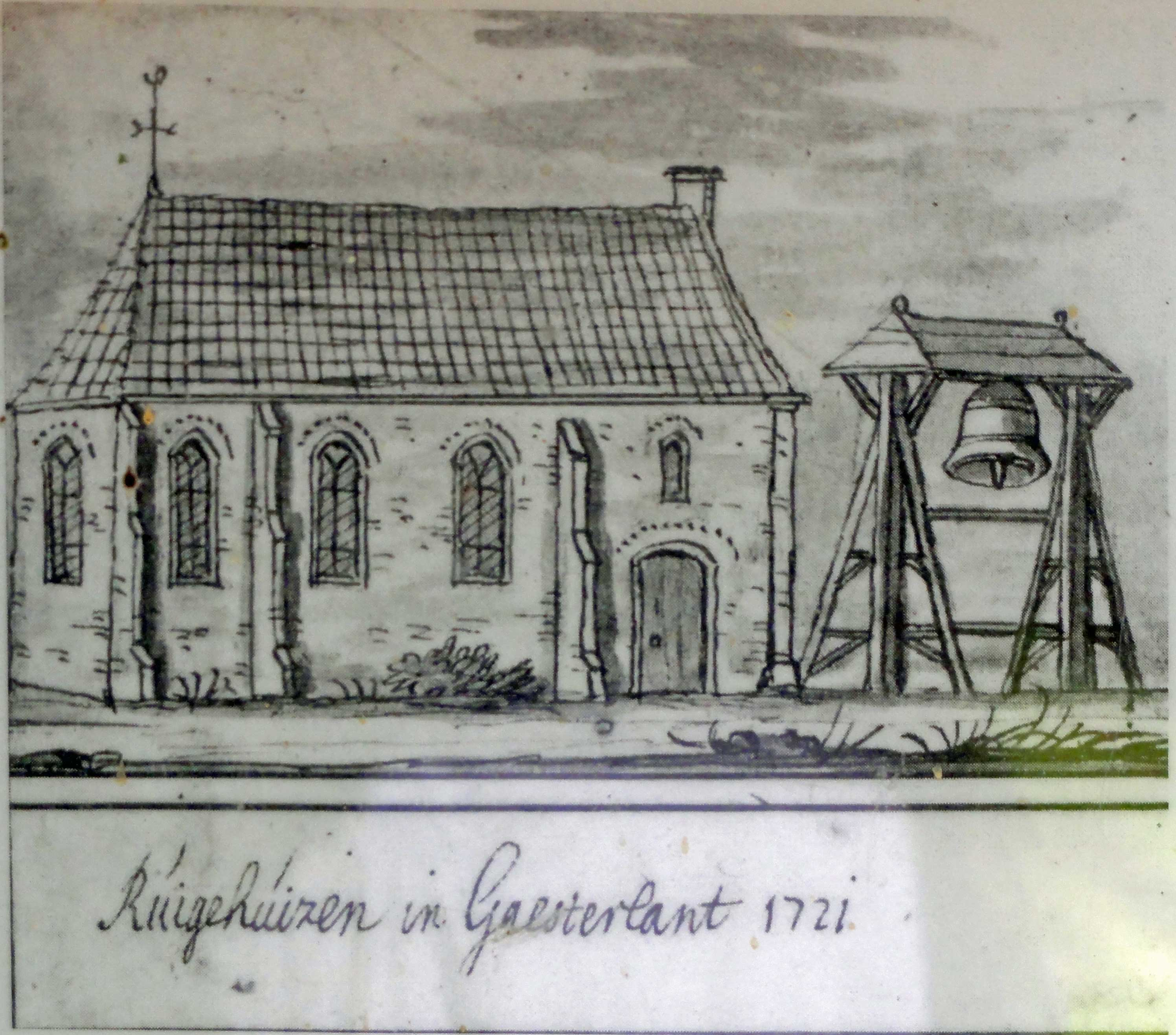
Drawing of the former church (1721)

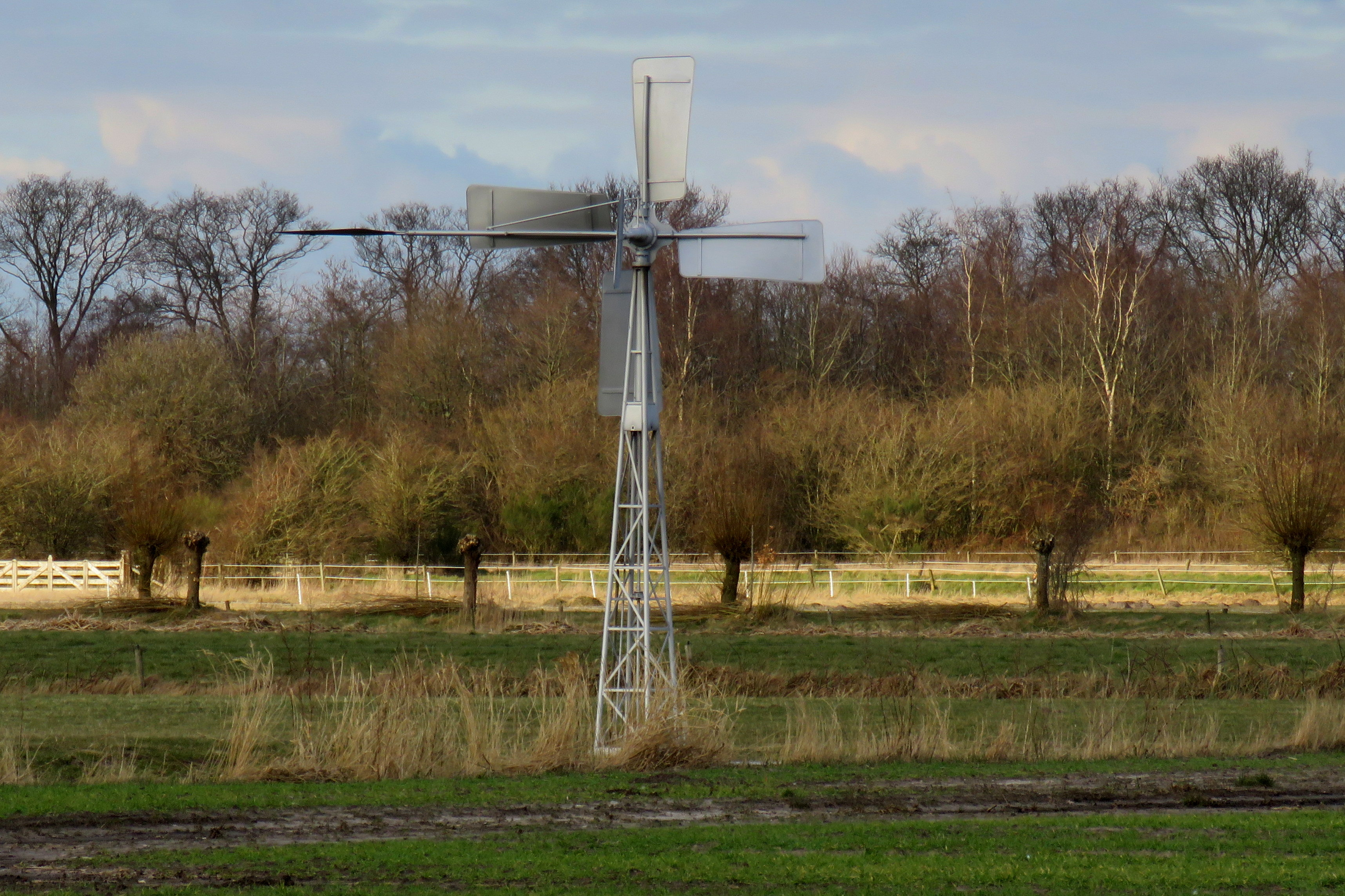
American wind mill

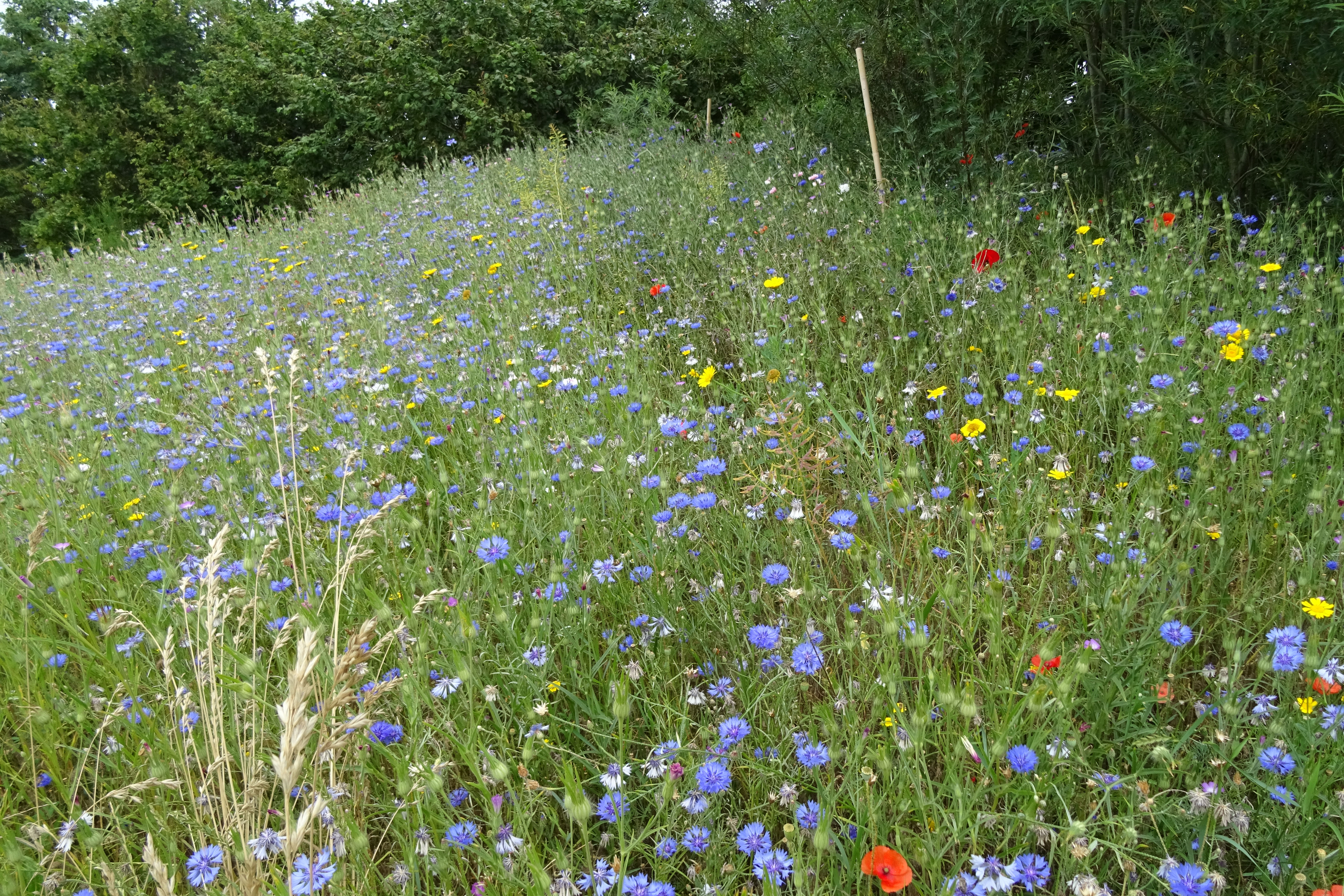
Slauerhoff nature area
