= Kolderwolde =

Kolderwolde Kolderwâlde
- Village
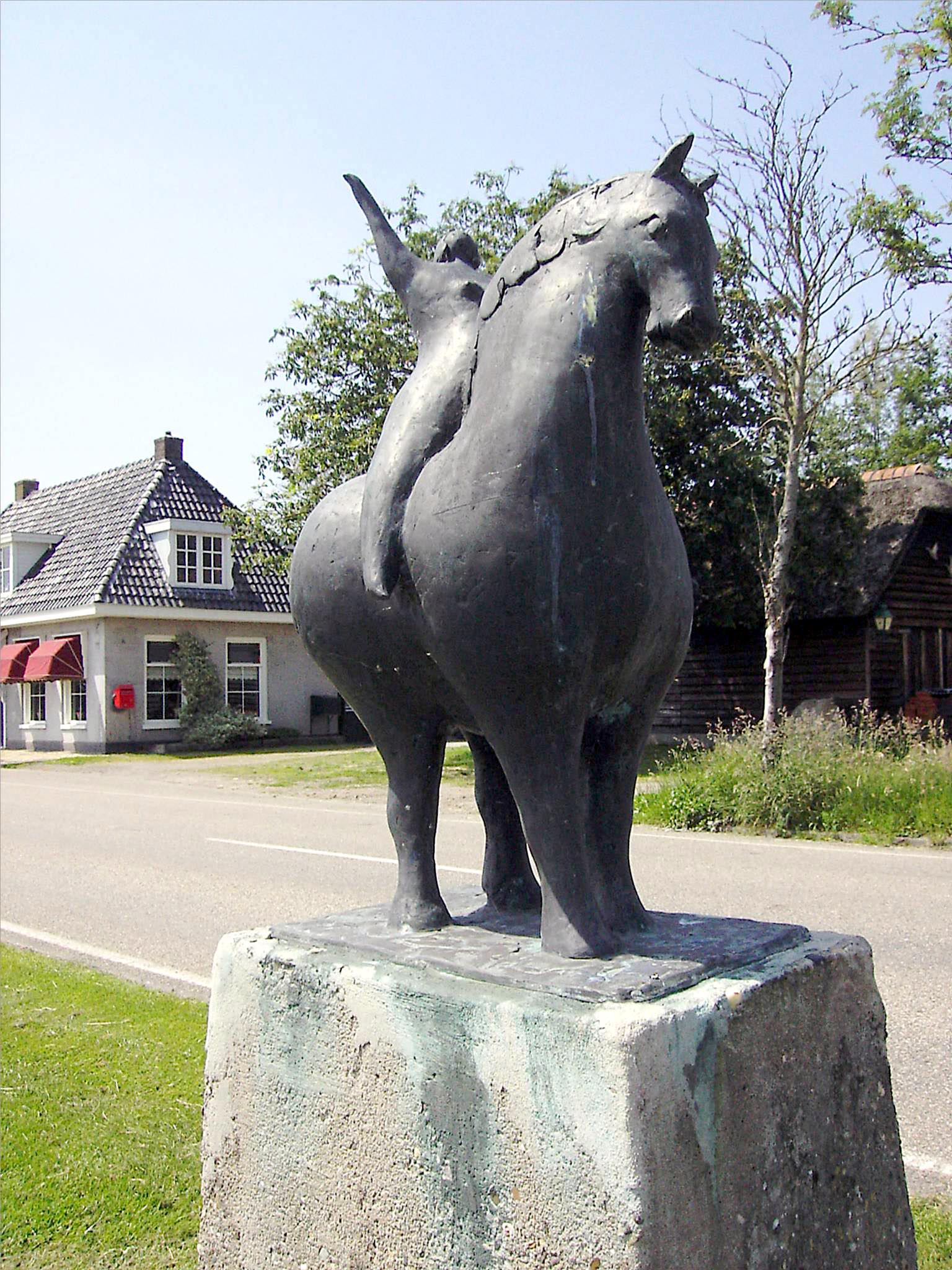
- Sietske statue in Kolderwolde

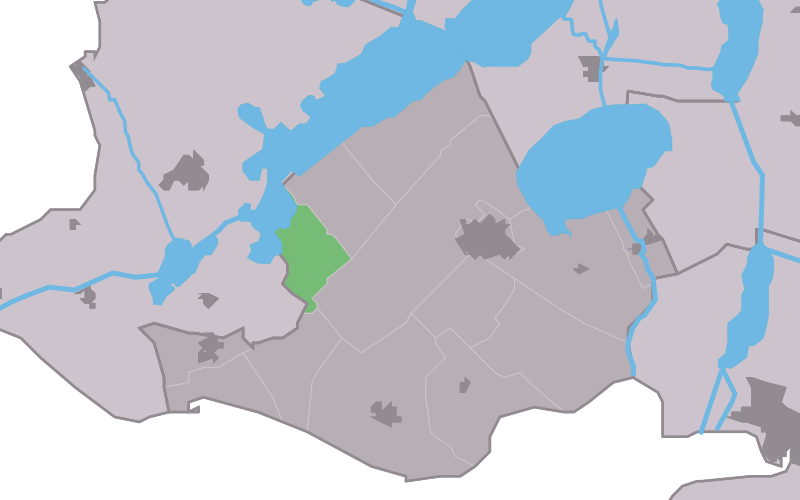
- Location in former Gaasterlân Sleat municipality

- Location in the Netherlands Kolderwolde (Netherlands)
- Country: Netherlands
- Province: Friesland
- Municipality: De Fryske Marren

Area
  - Total: 4.76 km^{2} (1.84 sq mi)
- Elevation: −0.1 m (−0.33 ft)

Population (2021)
  - Total: 50
  - Density: 11/km^{2} (27/sq mi)
- Time zone: UTC+1 (CET)
  - Summer (DST): UTC+2 (CEST)
- Postal code: 8583
- Dialing code: 0514

Kolderwolde (West Frisian: Kolderwâlde) is a village in De Fryske Marren municipality in the province of Friesland, the Netherlands. It had a population of around 55 in (2017).

== History ==
It was first mentioned in 1398 as Kolderwout, and means forest belonging to Koudum. Between 1830 and 1860, there was peat excavation in Kolderwolde. In 1840, it was home to 51 people. The church was demolished in the same year, and not rebuilt. 11 statutes are scatter through the village.

Before 2014, Kolderwolde was part of the Gaasterlân-Sleat municipality and before 1984 it belonged to Hemelumer Oldeferd which was named Hemelumer Oldephaert & Noordwolde (H.O.N.). before 1956.
