= De Fryske Marren =

- Municipality
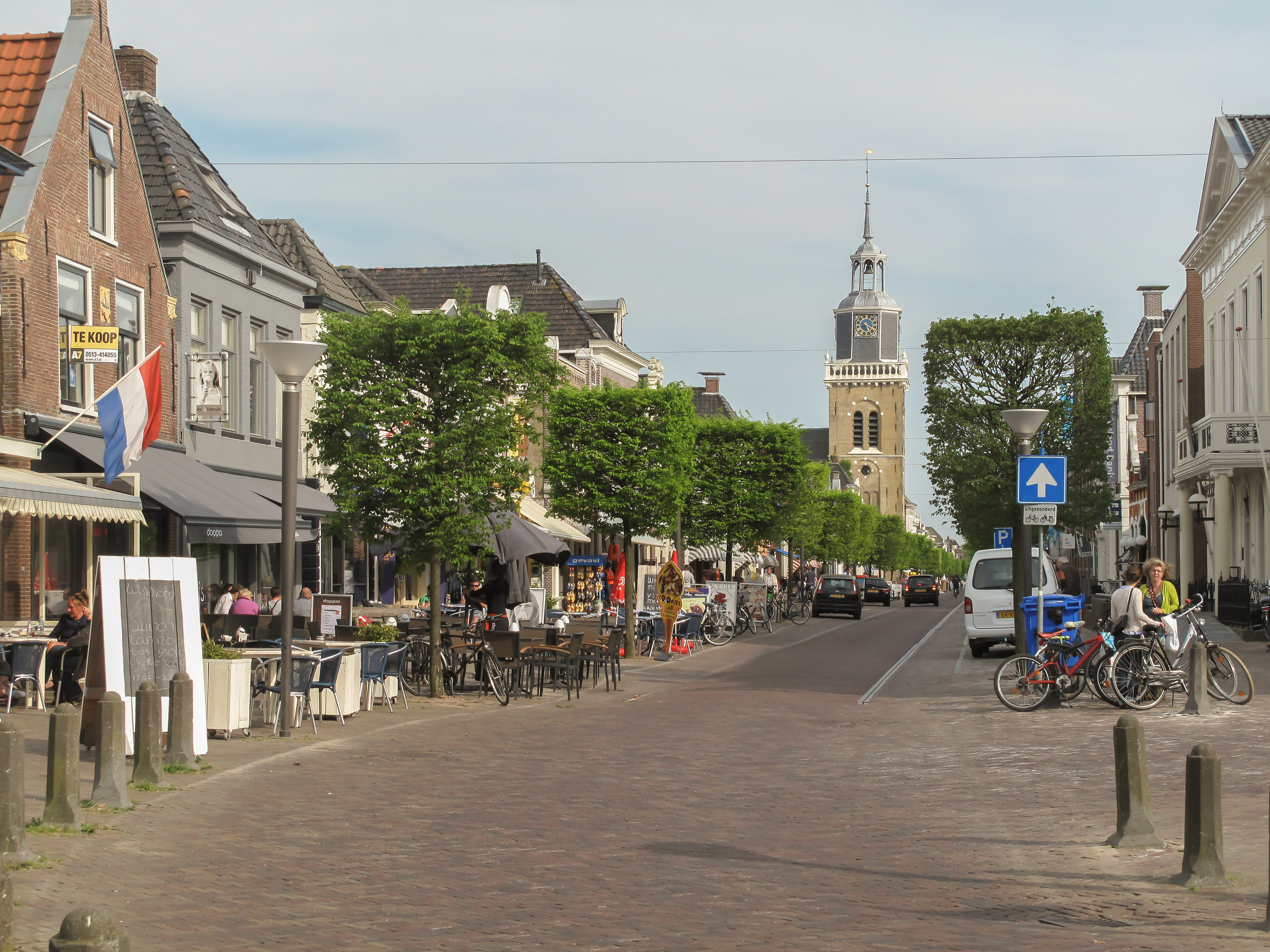
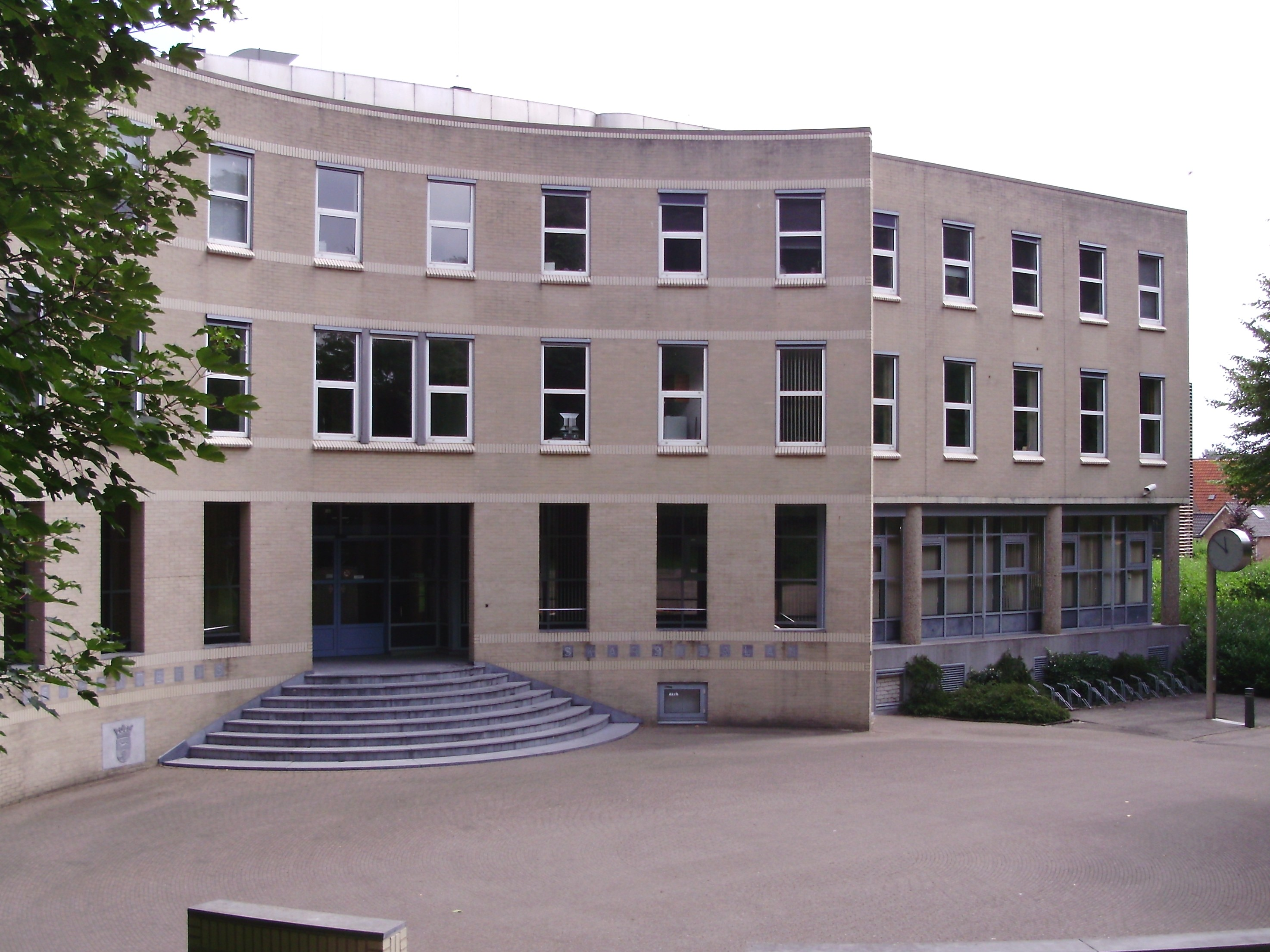
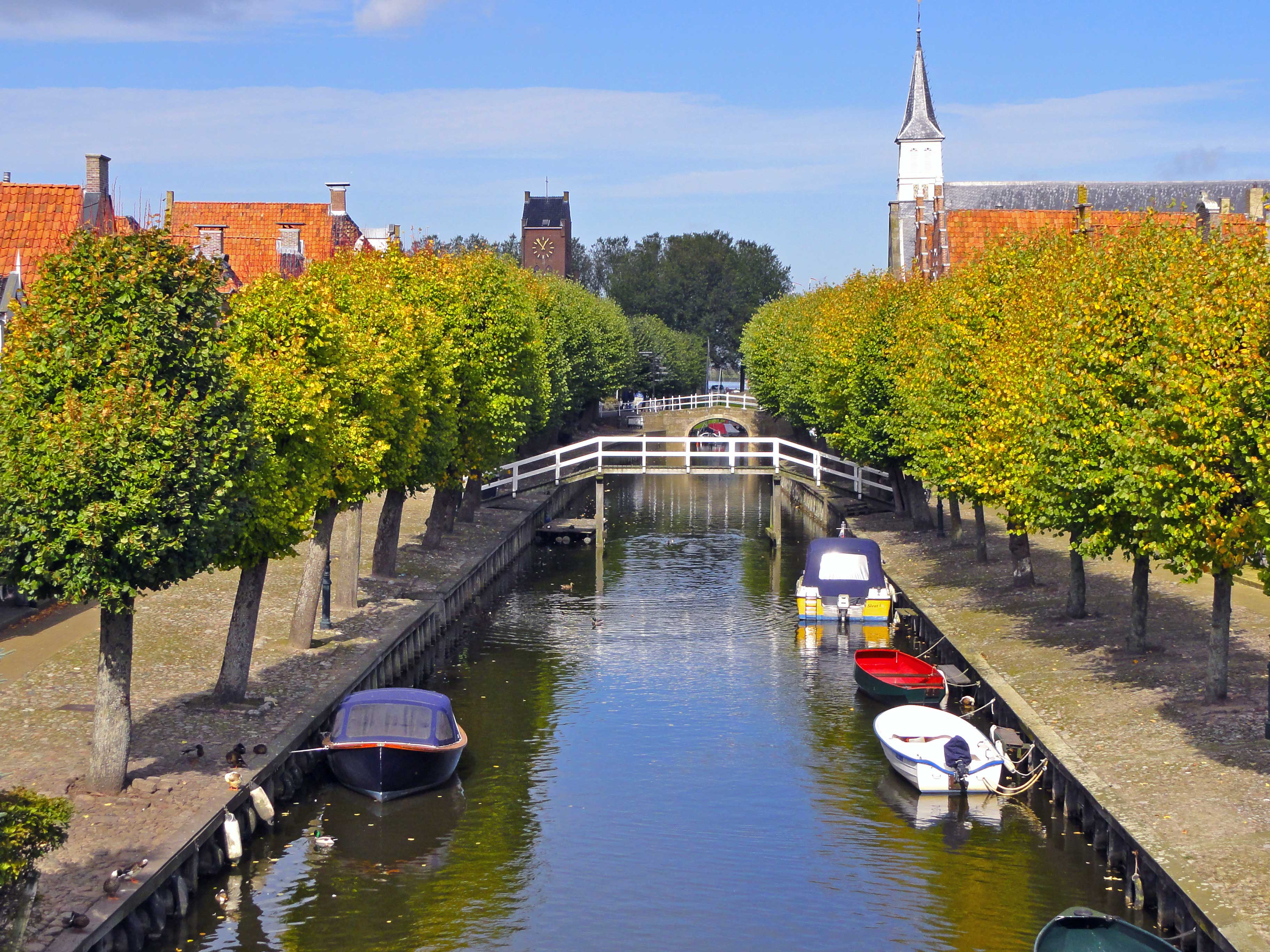
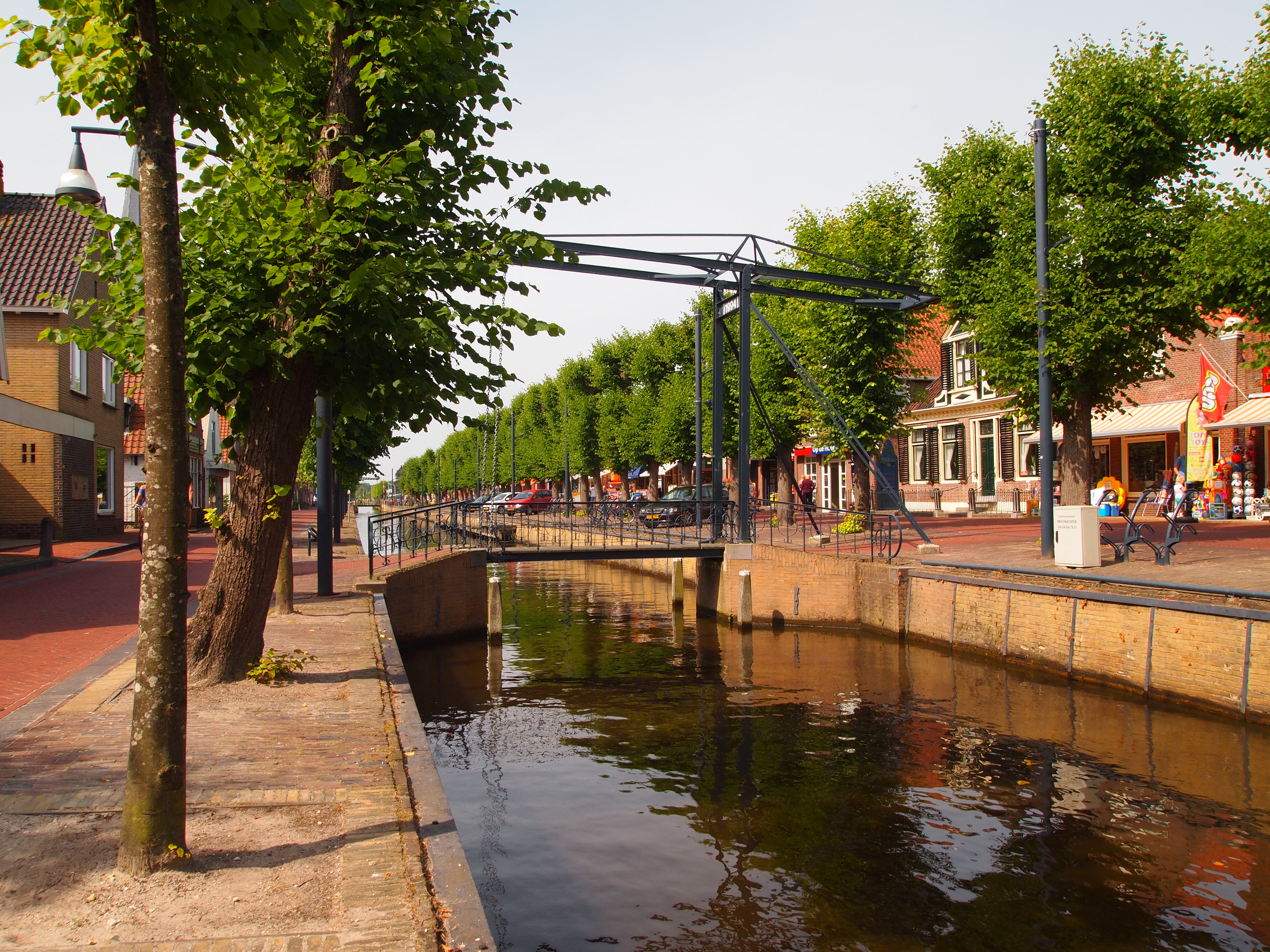
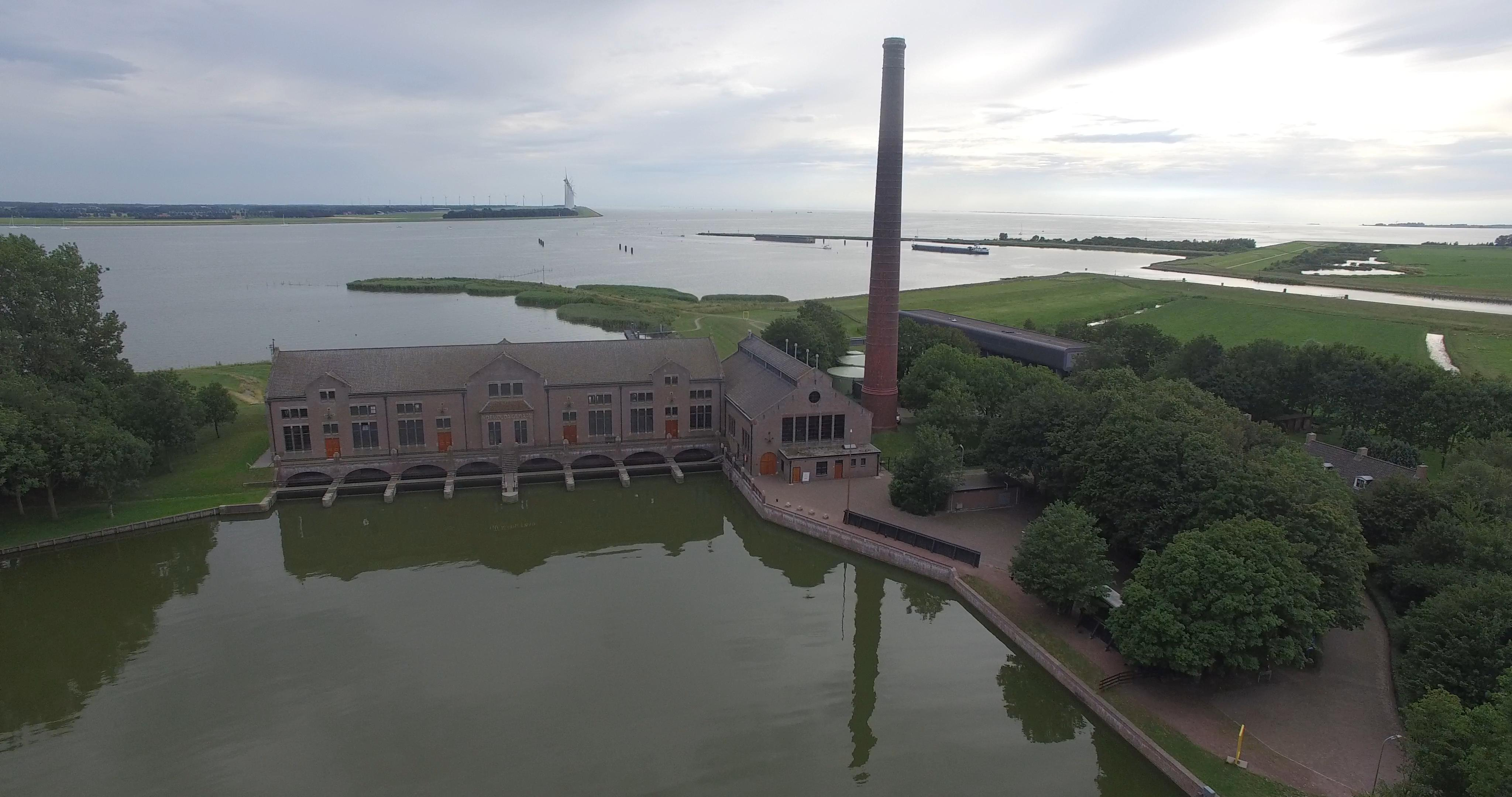
- Joure Joure town hall Sloten Balk Woudagemaal

- Flag Coat of arms

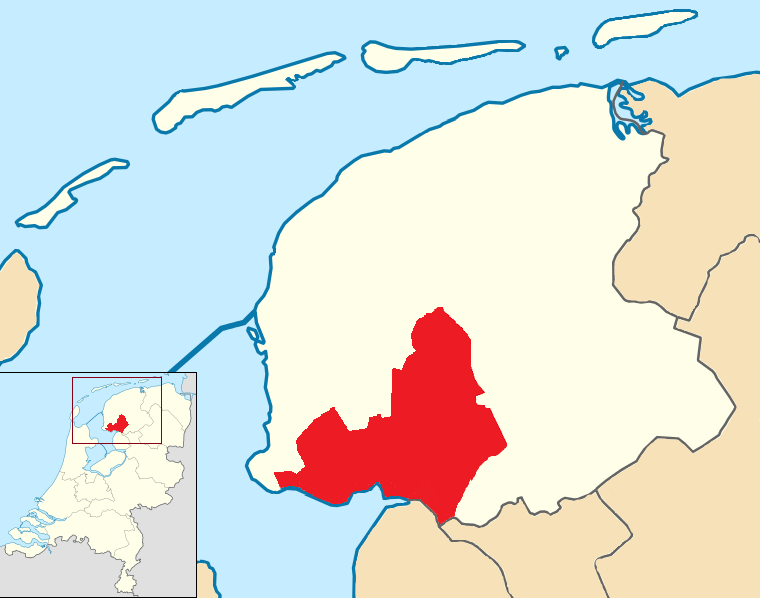
- Location in Friesland
- Coordinates: 52°58′N 5°47′E
- Country: Netherlands
- Province: Friesland
- Established: 1 January 2014

Government
  - Body: Municipal council
  - Mayor: Leo Pieter Stoel (VVD)

Area
  - Total: 559.93 km^{2} (216.19 sq mi)
  - Land: 351.29 km^{2} (135.63 sq mi)
  - Water: 208.64 km^{2} (80.56 sq mi)
- Elevation: 2 m (6.6 ft)

Population (January 2021)
  - Total: 51,778
  - Density: 147/km^{2} (380/sq mi)
- Time zone: UTC+1 (CET)
  - Summer (DST): UTC+2 (CEST)
- Postcode: Parts of 8400 and 8500 range
- Area code: 0513, 0514
- Website: www.defryskemarren.nl

De Fryske Marren (Dutch: De Friese Meren) is a municipality of Friesland in the northern Netherlands. It was established 1 January 2014 and consists of the former municipalities of Gaasterlân-Sleat, Lemsterland, Skarsterlân and parts of Boarnsterhim, all four of which were dissolved on the same day. The municipality is located in the province of Friesland, in the north of the Netherlands, and has a population of 52,248 inhabitants in a combined area of 559.93 km^{2} (216.19 sq mi).

== History ==
Municipal mergers are commonplace in the Netherlands: over the course of the 20th century the number of municipalities was reduced by more than half, from 1,121 in 1900 to 537 in 2000. Several of the municipalities that were amalgamated into De Fryske Marren were themselves the result of mergers as well: Gaasterlân-Sleat, Skarsterlân and Boarnsterhim were created during a series of mergers that took effect 1 January 1984. Government policy at the time of the creation of De Fryske Marren was that new mergers should have local support and be initiated by the effected municipalities themselves.

The municipalities of Gaasterlân-Sleat, Lemsterland and Skarsterlân were all rural municipalities with a relatively highly developed tourism industry. In 2007 the first two evaluated their functioning as municipalities and both concluded they could benefit from a municipal merger. The following year all three municipal councils decided they were in favour of investigating the benefits of a merger. The report from this study was publicly available for eight weeks and resulted in two negative replies. One of these was from the municipality of Heerenveen, which suggested a merger between them and Lemsterland and Skarsterlân or, alternatively, only parts of Skarsterlân. The province of Friesland, home to these municipalities, rejected these options, although the final draft of the merger proposal specified that two towns from Skarsterlân, Nieuwebrug and Haskerdijken, would become part of Heerenveen, while the rest would be included in De Fryske Marren. A second merging discussion involved the dissolution of Boarnsterhim. The municipal council of Boarnsterhim concluded the municipality was too small to warrant the continued existence of a separate municipality. In the final advice regarding its dissolution it was suggested that the current municipality be split into four parts; one of these, the town of Terherne, would be included in De Fryske Marren. The other three parts were divided among three preexisting municipalities: The northern part, including the actual town of Boarnsterhim, was assigned to Leeuwarden, the southern part to Heerenveen and the western part to Súdwest-Fryslân. After approval by both the House of Representatives and the Senate, the creation of De Fryske Marren (at that time called De Friese Meren) became law in June 2013 and took effect 1 January 2014.

== Etymology ==
De Friese Meren was the original name specified for the municipality in the law that established it. This was the same name that had been proposed for the municipality since the initial plans of its conception were tabled by the predecessor municipalities of Gaasterlân-Sleat, Lemsterland and Skarsterlân. The name is Dutch for "The Frisian Lakes", in reference to the lakes in the area. By law, any municipality in the Netherlands can change its name with at least a one-year notice. As the municipality already hinted at this possibility on its website, it officially changed its name to the West Frisian translation De Fryske Marren on 1 July 2015.

== Population centres ==
The municipality consists of 51 settlements of which Joure is the seat of government. The 51 cities, towns and villages are: Akmarijp, Bakhuizen, Balk, Bantega, Boornzwaag, Broek, Delfstrahuizen, Dijken, Doniaga, Echten, Echtenerbrug, Eesterga, Elahuizen, Follega, Goingarijp, Harich, Haskerhorne, Idskenhuizen, Joure, Kolderwolde, Langweer, Legemeer, Lemmer, Mirns, Nijehaske, Nijemirdum, Oldeouwer, Oosterzee, Oudega, Oudehaske, Oudemirdum, Ouwster-Nijega, Ouwsterhaule, Rijs, Rohel, Rotstergaast, Rotsterhaule, Rottum, Ruigahuizen, Scharsterbrug, Sint Nicolaasga, Sintjohannesga, Sloten, Snikzwaag, Sondel, Terherne, Terkaple, Teroele, Tjerkgaast, Vegelinsoord and Wijckel.

=== Topography ===

Dutch topographic map of the municipality of De Fryske Marren, September 2023

== Notable people ==
=== The arts ===
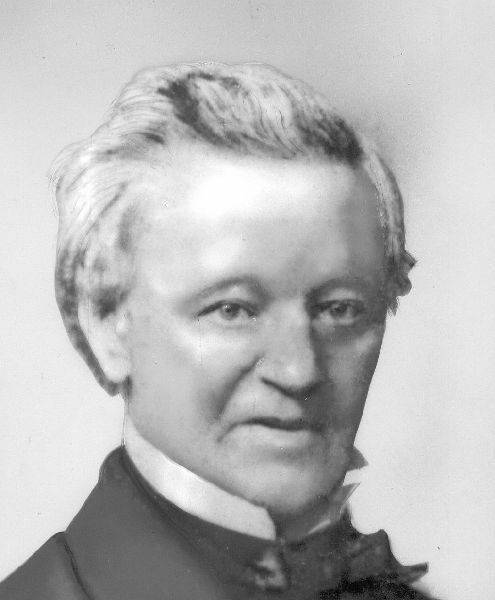
Justus Hiddes Halbertsma

- Jancko Douwama (1492 in Oldeboorn - 1533) a Frisian nobleman, fought to free Friesland from foreign rule
- Martinus Hamconius (c.1550 in Follega – 1620) a Frisian writer, poet and historian
- The three Brothers Halbertsma (c.1780 in Grou – c.1860) developed the written literature in the Western Frisian language
- Herman van Ham (1931 in Nijehaske – 2012) a Dutch head chef
- Pieter Verhoeff (1938 in Lemmer – 2019) a Dutch film director
- Marjan Jonkman (born 1994 in Sint Nicolaasga) a Dutch fashion model

=== Public thinking and public service ===
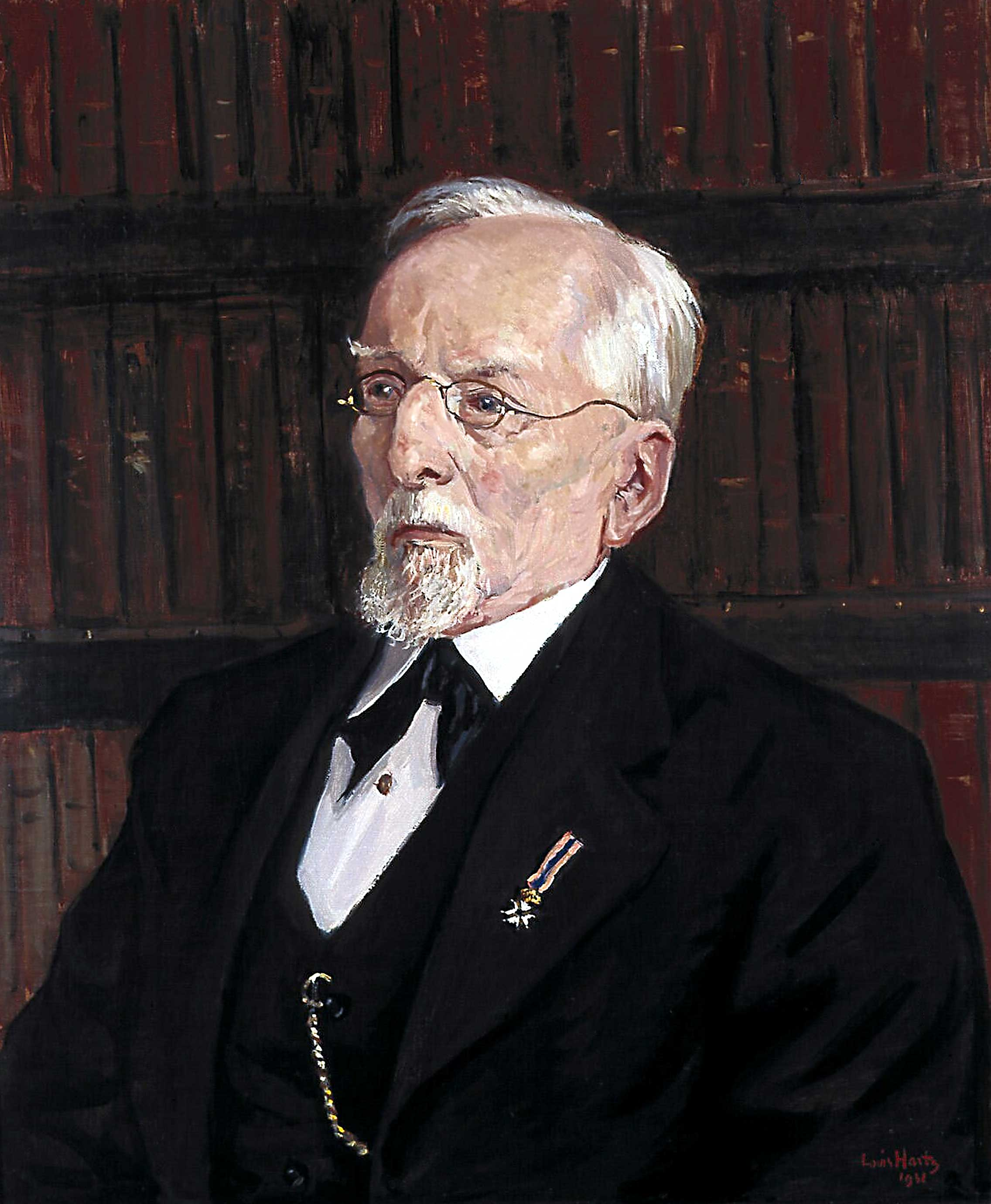
Martin Theo Houtsma, 1931

- Johannes Acronius Frisius (1520 in Akkrum – 1564) a Dutch doctor, mathematician who wrote Latin poetry and humanist tracts
- Henricus Aeneae (1743 in Oudemirdum – 1810) a Dutch scientist
- Hendrik van Rijgersma (born 1835 in Lemmer - 1877) naturalist, physician, amateur botanist, malacologist and ichthyologist
- Martijn Theodoor Houtsma (1851 in Irnsum – 1943) an orientalist, expert on the Seljuq dynasty
- Fedde Schurer (1898 in Drachten – 1968) a Dutch schoolteacher, journalist, West Frisian language activist and politician
- Heije Schaper (1906 in Joure – 1996) a highly decorated Dutch naval and air force officer
- Jan Pen (1921 in Lemmer – 2010) a Dutch economist, professor and columnist
- Frans Haarsma (1921 in Balk - 2009) a Roman Catholic priest of the Archdiocese of Utrecht
- Ahmed Dede (born 1960 in Balk) an Islamic sheikh and follower of the Sufi order of Islam
- Auke Zijlstra (born 1964 in Joure) a Dutch politician and member of the European Parliament

=== Sport ===
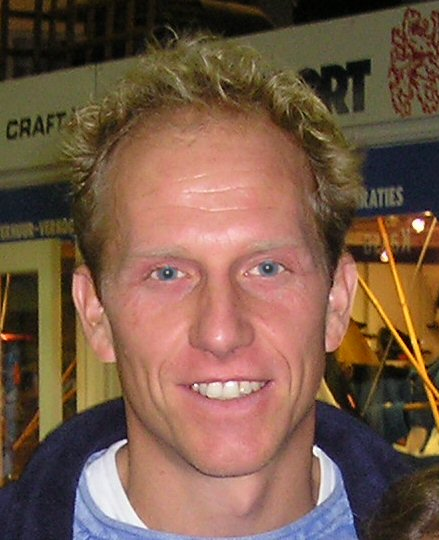
Rintje Ritsma, 2006

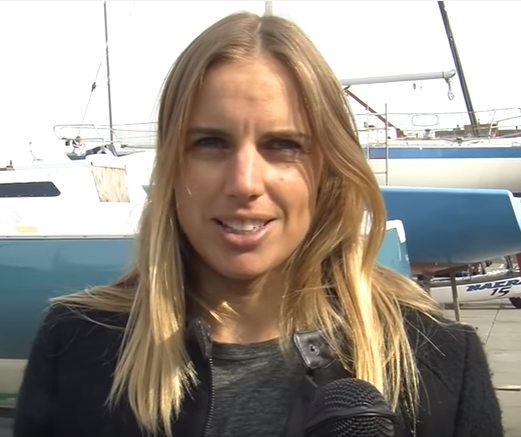
Marrit Bouwmeester, 2016

- Roelof Klein (1877 in Lemmer – 1960) Dutch rower, bronze medallist at the 1900 Summer Olympics
- Jetze Doorman (1881 in Balk – 1931) a fencer and pentathlete competing at the 1912 Summer Olympics
- Atje Keulen-Deelstra (1938 in Grou – 2013) speed skater, silver and bronze medallist at the 1972 Winter Olympics
- Sjoukje Dijkstra (born 1942 in Akkrum) former competitive figure skater, the 1964 Olympic champion in ladies' singles, the 1960 Olympic silver medalist
- Tiemen Groen (born 1946 in Follega) retired Dutch cyclist, competed in the 1964 Summer Olympics
- Rintje Ritsma (born 1970 in Lemmer) former Dutch long track speed skater, participated in five Winter Olympics, winning two silver and four bronze medals
- Ids Postma (born 1973 in Dearsum) former speed skater, gold medalist at the 1998 Winter Olympics
- Jorrit Bergsma (born 1986 in Oldeboorn) speed skater and marathon skater, gold medallist at the 2014 Winter Olympics
- Epke Zonderland (born 1986 in Lemmer) gymnast and 2012 Olympics gold medalist on the high bar
- Marit Bouwmeester (born 1988 in Warten) sailor, gold medallist in the 2016 Summer Olympics and silver medallist at the 2012 Summer Olympics
- Sjinkie Knegt (born 1989 in Bantega) Dutch short track speed skater, bronze medallist in the 2014 Winter Olympics and silver medallist in the 2018 Winter Olympics
