= Doniawerstal =

Former municipality in Friesland

Coordinates: 52.931879°N 5.677528°E

Doniawerstal was a municipality in southwest Friesland, south of Sneek. It consisted mainly of grassland and lakes. Its capital was Langweer. The municipality, also spelled Doniawarstal, published its own book of regulations.

The municipality was dissolved in 1984; part went to Wymbritseradiel and part went to Skarsterlân. At the time of its dissolution it had its Dutch name; in West Frisian it was Doanjewerstal.
