= List of windmills in Friesland (T–V) =

List of windmills in Friesland, Netherlands

A list of windmills in the Dutch province of Friesland, locations beginning T–V.

== T ==
Location	Name of mill	Type	Built	Notes	Photograph
Tacozijl	Waterschap Zeven Grietenijen en Stat Sloten; Tacozijl Uitheijing Polder; 52°51′43″N 5°38′40″E	Grondzeiler	1853	Demolished 1927.	
Terband	Vierde en Vijfde Veendistrict; Molen Nr. 4; 53°00′47″N 5°54′10″E	Grondzeiler	1835	Demolished 1913.	
Terband	Vierde en Vijfde Veendistrict; Molen Nr. 5; 53°00′39″N 5°53′50″E	Grondzeiler	1851	Demolished 1913.	
Terband	Vierde en Vijfde Veendistrict; Molen Nr. 6; 53°00′22″N 5°53′05″E	Grondzeiler	1851	Demolished 1913.	
Tergracht	Polder 9; 53°17′10″N 5°49′42″E	Grondzeiler	Before 1832	Demolished post-1930.	
Tergracht	Polder 15; 53°16′33″N 5°49′38″E	Spinnenkopmolen	Before 1832	Demolished before 1926.	
Tergracht	Polder 16; 53°16′35″N 5°50′03″E		Before 1850	Demolished before 1928.	
Tergracht	Polder 17; 53°16′45″N 5°50′10″E	Grondzeiler	Before 1854	Demolished post-1926.	
Tergracht	Wanswerder Mieden; 53°17′29″N 5°51′02″E		Before 1850	Burnt down 1908.	
Terherne	Korenmolen van Terhorne		Before 1718	Demolished post-1729.	
Terherne	Molen van de Doopsgezinde Gemeente; 53°02′29″N 5°47′12″E		Before 1832	Demolished before 1850.	
Terherne	Molen van Hantje Rijpkema; 53°02′49″N 5°46′47″E		Before 1832	Demolished before 1930.	
Terherne	Molen van Tjeerd Rijpkema; 53°02′29″N 5°46′43″E		Before 1832	Demolished before 1805.	
Terherne	Polder 89; 53°01′41″N 5°47′11″E	Spinnenkopmolen	Before 1832	Demolished post-1924.	
Terherne	Polder 90; 53°02′07″N 5°47′22″E	Spinnenkopmolen	Before 1832	Demolished between 1924 and 1929.	
Terherne	Polder 91; 53°02′06″N 5°47′05″E	Spinnenkopmolen	Before 1832	Demolished before 1929.	
Terherne	Polder 92; 53°02′30″N 5°47′10″E	Spinnenkopmolen	Before 1832	Demolished between 1924 and 1929.	
Terherne	Polder 93; 53°02′41″N 5°47′05″E	Spinnenkopmolen	Before 1832	Demolished before 1924.	
Terherne	Polder 94; 53°02′36″N 5°47′15″E	Spinnenkopmolen	Before 1877	Demolished between 1924 and 1929.	
Terherne	Polder 95; 53°02′35″N 5°47′24″E	Spinnenkopmolen	Before 1806	Demolished between 1924 and 1929.	
Terherne	Polder 96; 53°02′16″N 5°47′36″E	Spinnenkopmolen	Beforfe 1832	Demolished before 1924.	
Terherne	Polder 97; 53°02′22″N 5°48′23″E	Spinnenkopmolen	Before 1832	Demolished between 1924 and 1929.	
Terherne	Polder 98; 53°01′56″N 5°48′12″E	Spinnenkopmolen	Before 1832	Demolished between 1924 and 1929.	
Terherne	Polder 170; 53°02′09″N 5°46′27″E	Spinnenkopmolen	Before 1832	Demolished before 1929.	
Terherne	Polder 170a 53°02′17″N 5°46′19″E	Spinnenkopmolen	Before 1832	Demolished before 1929.	
Terherne	Polder 171; 53°02′05″N 5°46′27″E	Spinnenkopmolen	Before 1832	Demolished before 1929.	
Terherne	Polder 248; 53°02′51″N 5°47′18″E	Spinnenkopmolen	Before 1876	Demolished before 1924.	
Terherne	Polder 249; 53°02′59″N 5°47′20″E	Spinnenkopmolen	Before 1876	Demolished between 1924 and 1929.	
Terkaple	Molen van Jr. Tinco Lyckema à Nijeholt; 53°01′28″N 5°46′45″E		Before 1832	Demolished before 1850.	
Terkaple	Molen van Klaas Koopmans; 53°01′02″N 5°47′13″E		Before 1832	Demolished before 1850.	
Terkaple	Polder 81; 53°00′41″N 5°47′04″E	Spinnenkopmolen	Before 1832	Demolished between 1850 and 1929.	
Terkaple	Polder 83; 53°01′03″N 5°47′36″E	Spinnenkopmolen	Before 1832	Demolished before 1929.	
Terkaple	Polder 84; 53°01′07″N 5°47′06″E	Spinnenkopmolen	Before 1832	Demolished before 1929.	
Terkaple	Polder 85; 53°01′03″N 5°47′15″E	Spinnenkopmolen	Before 1877	Demolished before 1924.	
Terkaple	Polder 86; 53°01′18″N 5°46′58″E		Before 1832	Demolished 1884.	
Terkaple	Oud Polder 87; 53°01′26″N 5°46′54″E		Before 1832	Demolished before 1850.	
Terkaple	Nieuw Polder 87; 53°01′20″N 5°46′58″E	Spinnenkopmolen	Between 1850 and 1877	Demolished before 1924.	
Terkaple	Polder 88; 53°01′30″N 5°46′50″E	Spinnenkopmolen	Before 1877	Demolished before 1924.	
Terkaple	Polder Heerenzijl; Molen van Veldhui9s; 53°01′18″N 5°46′58″E	Grondzeiler	1884	Demolished 1935.	
Ternaard	De Rogmolen; 53°22′55″N 5°57′43″E	Standerdmolen	Before 1663	Demolished 1818.	
Ternaard	Molen van Gorter; Molen van Postuma; 53°22′43″N 5°57′47″E	Stellingmolen	1824	Demolished 1909.	
Teroele	Nieuwe Teroelesterpolder; 52°56′30″N 5°42′51″E	Iron windpump	1920		
Teroele	Molen van Burmania; Molen van Jelle Joukes; 52°55′53″N 5°42′08″E	Spinnenkopmolen	Before 1750	Demolished before 1832.	
Teroele	Molen van Burmania; Molen van Jurk Jolles; 52°56′21″N 5°42′01″E	Spinnenkopmolen	Before 1750	Demolished before 1832.	
Teroele	Molen van Grietman Vegelin. 52°56′18″N 5°42′00″E	Spinnenkopmolen	Before 1750	Demolished before 1832.	
Teroele	Molen van Pieter Hettinga; 52°56′02″N 5°41′40″E		Before 1832	Demolished before 1850.	
Teroele	Molen van Pijtter Wijbes; 52°56′21″N 5°42′00″E	Spinnenkopmolen	Before 1750	Demolished before 1832.	
Teroele	Molen van Pijtter Wijbes; 52°56′29″N 5°42′08″E	Spinnenkopmolen	Before 1750	Demolished before 1832.	
Teroele	Molen van Romke en Jurjen Johannes; 52°56′00″N 5°42′00″E	Spinnenkopmolen	Before 1750	Demolished before 1832.	
Teroele	Molen van Sijtse Joukes; Molen van Rommert Annes; 52°56′09″N 5°42′02″E	Spinnenkopmolen	Before 1750	Demolished before 1832.	
Teroele	Molen van Wopke Bartles; 52°56′28″N 5°42′09″E	Spinnenkopmolen	Before 1750	Demolished before 1832.	
Teroele	Nieuwe Teroelesterolder; 52°56′30″N 5°42′51″E		Before 1887	Demolished 1924.	
Teroele	Polder 18; 52°56′02″N 5°41′35″E	Spinnenkopmolen	Before 1850	Demolished post-1930.	
Teroele	52°56′36″N 5°41′51″E		Before 1873	Demolished before 1909.	
Teroele	Polder Wittemans; 52°56′11″N 5°41′28″E	Grondzeiler	1909	Demolished post-1932.	
Teroele	Teroelsterolder; 52°56′23″N 5°41′39″E		Before 1832	Demolished post-1909.	
Tersoal	Molen van Abraham Bruinsma; 53°04′18″N 5°44′46″E	Spinnenkopmolen	Before 1832	Demolished before 1850.	
Tersoal	Molen van Anna Stirum; 53°04′19″N 5°44′51″E	Spinnenkopmolen	Before 1832	Demolished post-1850.	
Tersoal	Molen van Christoffer Schwartz; 53°04′17″N 5°43′58″E	Spinnenkopmolen	Before 1832	Demolished before 1850.	
Tersoal	Molen van Christoffer Schwartz; 53°04′17″N 5°45′09″E	Spinnenkopmolen	Before 1832	Demolished before 1850.	
Tersoal	Molen van Christoffer Schwartz; 53°04′35″N 5°43′56″E	Spinnenkopmolen	Before 1832	Demolished post-1865.	
Tersoal	Molen van C. W. F. J. Stirum; 53°04′30″N 5°44′40″E	Spinnenkopmolen	Before 1832	Demolished before 1850.	
Tersoal	Molen van Dirk Dijkstra; 53°03′51″N 5°44′36″E	Spinnenkopmolen	Before 1832	Demolished beforfe 1850.	
Tersoal	Molen van Harmen Dijkstra; 53°04′38″N 5°44′14″E	Spinnenkopmolen	Before 1832	Demolished post-1864.	
Tersoal	Molen van Jan Nauta; 53°03′30″N 5°45′00″E		1850	Demolished between 1930 and 1932.	
Tersoal	Molen van W. C. G. van Welderen Rangers; 53°04′32″N 5°43′19″E	Spinnenkopmolen	Before 1832	Demolished before 1850.	
Tersoal	Molen van Wilco van Andringa de Kempenaer; 53°04′58″N 5°44′29″E	Spinnenkopmolen	Before 1832		
Tersoal	Polder 161; Molen van de Marskrite; 53°04′58″N 5°44′29″E	Grondzeiler	1832	Burnt down 1917.	
Tersoal	Polder 162; 53°04′40″N 5°43′54″E	Spinnenkopmolen	1864	Demolished before 1929.	
Tersoal	Polder 163; 53°04′39″N 5°43′37″E	Spinnenkopmolen	Before 1832	Demolished before 1929.	
Tersoal	Polder 165; 53°04′13″N 5°43′55″E	Spinnenkopmolen	Before 1832	Demolished before 1929.	
Tersoal	Polder 167; 53°04′08″N 5°44′13″E	Grondzeiler	Before 1832	Demolished before 1929.	
Tersoal	Polder 168; 53°04′15″N 5°44′19″E	Spinnenkopmolen	Before 1832	Demolished between 1850 and 1929.	
Tersoal	Polder 168a 53°03′59″N 5°44′36″E	Spinnenkopmolen	Before 1832	Demolished before 1929.	
Tersoal	Polder 169; Molen van Sanne Dijkstra; 53°03′44″N 5°44′35″E		Between 1832 and 1850	Demolished before 1929.	
Tersoal	Polder 170; 53°04′22″N 5°44′18″E	Spinnenkopmolen	Before 1832	Demolished before 1929.	
Tersoal	Polder 171; 53°04′03″N 5°44′46″E	Spinnenkopmolen	Before 1832	Demolished before 1929.	
Tersoal	Polder 172; 53°04′24″N 5°45′01″E		Before 1832	Demolished before 1929.	
Tersoal	Polder 175; 53°03′41″N 5°45′06″E		Before 1873	Demolished before 1928.	
Tersoal	Polder 230; 53°03′52″N 5°45′12″E		1850	Demolished before 1929.	
Tersoal	53°03′34″N 5°45′19″E		1850	Demolished between 1930 and 1932.	
Terwispel	Molen van Ambrosius van Boelens; 53°01′49″N 6°02′10″E		Before 1832	Demolished before 1850.	
Terwispel	Polder A Polder Kolderveen; Molen van Brouwer; 53°01′32″N 6°02′59″E	Spinnenkopmolen	1868	Demolished 1926.	
Terwispel	Polder B 53°01′18″N 6°03′31″E		Before 1877	Demolished before 1924.	
Terwispel	Polder B 53°01′24″N 6°03′17″E	Weidemolen	Before 1877	Demolished before 1924.	
Terwispel	Veenpolder; 53°01′47″N 6°02′36″E		Before 1850	Demolished post-1864.	
Terwispel	Veenpolder 6th & 7th District, part 141; 53°01′25″N 6°00′13″E	Weidemolen	Before 1877	Demolished before 1924.	
Terwispel	Veenpolder 6th & 7th District, part 142; 53°01′19″N 6°00′28″E	Weidemolen	Before 1877	Demolished before 1924.	
Terwispel	Veenpolder 6th & 7th District, part 143; 53°01′22″N 6°00′43″E	Weidemolen	Before 1877	Demolished before 1924.	
Terwispel	Veenpolder 6th & 7th District, part 144; 53°01′03″N 6°01′16″E	Weidemolen	Before 1877	Demolished post-1887.	
Terwispel	Veenpolder 6th & 7th District, part 145; 53°01′39″N 6°01′44″E	Weidemolen	Before 1877	Demolished before 1924.	
Terwispel	Veenpolder 6th & 7th District, part 146; 53°01′30″N 6°01′57″E	Weidemolen	Before 1877	Demolished before 1924.	
Terwispel	Veenpolder 6th & 7th District, part 147; 53°01′40″N 6°02′17″E	Weidemolen	Before 1877	Demolished before 1924.	
Terwispel	Veenpolder 6th & 7th District, part 148; 53°01′55″N 6°01′30″E	Weidemolen	Before 1877	Demolished before 1924.	
Terwispel	Veenpolder 6th & 7th District, part 149; 53°02′12″N 6°01′17″E	Weidemolen	Before 1877	Demolished before 1924.	
Terwispel	Veenpolder 6th & 7th District, part 150; 53°02′22″N 6°01′23″E	Weidemolen	Before 1877	Demolished before 1924.	
Terwispel	Vier Polders; Kleine Molen; 53°00′34″N 6°02′39″E		Before 1832	Demolished post-1887.	
Terwispel	Vier Polders; Klidsemolen; Klissemolen; 53°00′31″N 6°01′19″E	Grondzeiler	1829	Demolished 1893.	
Terwispel	Vier Polders; Kooimolen; 53°00′28″N 6°02′21″E		Before 1832	Demolished before 1877.	
Terwispel	Vier Polder; Schoolmolen; 53°00′35″N 6°03′06″E		Before 1832	Demolished post-1887.	
Terwispel	53°01′14″N 6°01′20″E	Weidemolen	Before 1864	Demolished post-1877.	
Terwispel	53°01′13″N 6°01′17″E	Weidemolen	Before 1864	Demolished post-1877.	
Terwispel	Zesde en Zevende Veendistrict; Boezemmolen Nr. 1 Harnemolen; Harnemoune; 53°02′21″N 6°02′10″E	Grondzeiler	1866	Demolished c.1905.	
Terwispel	Zesde en Zevende Veendistrict; Boezemmolen Nr. 2; 53°02′31″N 6°01′32″E	Grondzeiler	Before 1864	Demolished c.1905.	
Tibma	Moolen van het Dijksbestuur; 53°20′27″N 6°08′37″E	Spinnenkopmolen	Before 1832	Demolished before 1850.	
Tibma	Molen van Jan Tibma; 53°19′54″N 6°07′03″E		1879	Demolished before 1930.	
Tibma	Molen van Jouwert Witteveen; 53°20′11″N 6°07′49″E	Spinnenkopmolen	Before 1832	Demolished 1880.	
Tibma	Polder 2; 53°20′18″N 6°07′54″E	Spinnenkopmolen	Before 1832	Demolished before 1930.	
Tibma	Polder 3 Wattenwiensterpolder; 53°20′11″N 6°07′49″E	Grondzeiler	1880	Demolished 1955.	
Tibma	Polder 4; 53°20′11″N 6°07′53″E		Before 1832	Demolished before 1850.	
Tibma	Polder 4; 53°20′08″N 6°07′17″E	Grondzeiler	1879	Demolished 1951.	
Tijnje	De Deelen	Tjasker	1973	Molendatabase (in Dutch); De Hollandsche Molen (in Dutch)	
Tijnje	Boezemmolen	Smock mill	1856	Molendatabase (in Dutch); De Hollandsche Molen (in Dutch)	
Tijnje	53°03′03″N 5°57′34″E	Weidemolen	Before 1880	Demolished before 1887.	
Tijnje	Molen van Fedde Lageveen; 53°02′01″N 5°58′40″E		Before 1832	Demolished before 1850.	
Tijnje	Molen van Fedde Lageveen; 53°01′22″N 6°00′02″E		Before 1832	Demolished before 1850.	
Tijnje	Molen van Fedde Lageveen; 53°02′15″N 5°58′10″E		Before 1832	Demolished before 1850.	
Tijnje	Molen van Fedde Lageveen; Veenpolder 6th & 7th district, part 136; 53°01′57″N 5°58′55″E		Before 1832	Demolished post-1887.	
Tijnje	Molen van Fedde Zwanenburg; 53°02′22″N 5°58′31″E		Before 1832	Demolished before 1805.	
Tijnje	Molen van Fouke Roukema; Veenpolder 6th & 7th district, part 131; 53°02′26″N 5°58′45″E		Before 1832	Demolished post-1887.	
Tijnje	Molen van Hendrik Bouwer; 53°01′40″N 5°59′00″E		Before 1832	Demolished before 1850.	
Tijnje	Molen van Hendrik van Dam; 53°00′43″N 5°59′57″E		Before 1832	Demolished before 1850.	
Tijnje	Molen van Hendrik van Dam; 53°01′09″N 6°00′06″E		Before 1832	Demolished post-1877.	
Tijnje	Molen van Huisman; 53°02′45″N 5°57′24″E	Weidemolen	Before 1880	Demolished before 1887.	
Tijnje	Molen van Jelle de Groot; 53°01′00″N 5°59′57″E		Before 1832	Demolished before 1850.	
Tijnje	Molen van J. Kalsbeek; 53°02′43″N 5°57′24″E	Weidemolen	Before 1880	Demolished before 1887.	
Tijnje	Molen van Jouke Voolstra; 53°02′37″N 5°58′12″E		Before 1832	Demolished before 1850.	
Tijnje	Molen van Rintze Dragstra; 53°02′15″N 5°59′00″E		Before 1832	Demolished before 1850.	
Tijnje	Molen van Sierd Boonstra; 53°02′15″N 5°58′36″E		Before 1832	Demolished before 1850.	
Tijnje	Molen van Tjebbe Hartmans; 53°02′36″N 5°59′05″E		Before 1832	Demolished post-1887.	
Tijnje	Molen van W. Dragstra; 53°02′57″N 5°57′54″E	Weidemolen	Before 1880	Demolished before 1887.	
Tijnje	Molen van Wijger Broers; 53°02′19″N 5°59′47″E		Before 1832	Demolished before 1850.	
Tijnje	Molen van Wijtze Eppinga; 53°01′38″N 5°59′29″E		Before 1832	Demolished before 1850.	
Tijnje	Veenpolder 6th & 7th District, part 129; 53°02′40″N 5°58′10″E	Weidemolen	Before 1877	Demolished before 1924.	
Tijnje	Veenpolder 6th & 7th District, part 130; 53°02′30″N 5°58′39″E	Weidemolen	Before 1877	Demolished before 1887/	
Tijnje	Veenpolder 6th & 7th District, part 132; 53°02′11″N 5°58′57″E	Weidemolen	Before 1877	Demolished before 1887.	
Tijnje	Veenpolder 6th & 7th District, part 133; 53°02′10″N 5°59′06″E	Weidemolen	Before 1877	Demolished before 1887.	
Tijnje	Veenpolder 6th & 7th District, part 134; 53°02′07″N 5°58′47″E	Weidemolen	Before 1877	Demolished before 1887.	
Tijnje	Veenpolder 6th & 7th District, part 134; 53°02′12″N 5°59′33″E	Weidemolen	Before 1877	Demolished before 1887.	
Tijnje	Veenpolder 6th & 7th District, part <137br>53°01′53″N 5°59′20″E	Weidemolen	Before 1877	Demolished before 1887.	
Tijnje	Veenpolder 6th & 7th District, part 138; 53°01′50″N 5°58′37″E	Weidemolen	Before 1877	Demolished before 1887.	
Tijnje	Veenpolder 6th & 7th District, part 139; 53°01′48″N 5°59′59″E	Weidemolen	Before 1877	Demolished before 1887.	
Tijnje	Veenpolder 6th & 7th District, part 140; 53°01′40″N 6°00′00″E	Weidemolen	Before 1877	Demolished before 1887.	
Tijnje	Zesde en Zevende Veendistrict; 53°02′24″N 5°56′48″E	Grondzeiler	Before 1864		
Tijnje	Zesde en Zevende Veendistrict; 53°02′55″N 6°00′01″E	Grondzeiler	Before 1864		
Tijnje	Zesde en Zevende Veendistrict; Boezemmolen Nr. 3; 53°03′10″N 5°59′06″E	Grondzeiler	Before 1864	Demolished c.1905.	
Tijnje	Zesde en Zevende Veendistrict; Boezemmolen Nr. 4; 53°03′24″N 5°58′10″E	Grondzeiler	1856	Demolished 1912.	
Tijnje	Zesde en Zevende Veendistrict first draining Molen Nr. 8; 53°00′34″N 5°59′54″E	Grondzeiler	1858	Demolished c.1905.	
Tijnje	Zesde en Zevende Veendistrict first draining Molen Nr. 9; 53°00′30″N 6°00′46″E	Grondzeiler	1858	Demolished c.1905.	
Tijnje	Zesde en Zevende Veendistrict lower part 53°03′11″N 5°58′11″E	Weidemolen	Before 1876	Demolished before 1887.	
Tijnje	Zesde en Zevende Veendistrict lower part 53°03′12″N 5°58′21″E	Weidemolen	Before 1876	Demolished before 1887.	
Tijnje	Zesde en Zevende Veendistrict lower part 53°03′02″N 5°59′02″E		Before 1876	Demolished before 1887.	
Tijnje	Zesde en Zevende Veendistrict lower part 53°02′57″N 5°59′19″E		Before 1876	Demolished before 1887.	
Tijnje	Zesde en Zevende Veendistrict north westerly draining Molen Nr. 5; 53°03′08″N 5°57′27″E	Grondzeiler	Before 1864	Demolished c.1905.	
Tijnje	Zesde en Zevende Veendistrict north westerly draining Molen Nr. 6; 53°02′31″N 5°56′54″E	Grondzeiler	Before 1864	Demolished c.1905.	
Tijnje	Zesde en Zevende Veendistrict north westerly draining Molen Nr. 7; 53°01′32″N 5°59′06″E	Grondzeiler	1865	Moved to Harkstede, Groningen 1889.	
Tirns	Waterschap Scharnegoutum c.a. Tirnsepolder; Windmotor Tirns; 53°03′21″N 5°37′54″E	Iron windump	1922		
Tirns	Aberder Moellen; 53°03′12″N 5°38′03″E	Standerdmolen	Before 1516	Demolished 1557.	
Tirns	Molen van Baron S. Rengers; 53°03′50″N 5°37′41″E	Spinnenkopmolen	Before 1832	Demolished before 1850.	
Tirns	Molen van de Diaconie; 53°03′27″N 5°37′33″E		Before 1832	Demolished before 1805.	
Tirns	Molen van Ippe Jans Wiersma; 53°03′52″N 5°37′42″E	Spinnenkopmolen	Before 1832	Demolished before 1840.	
Tirns	Polder 93; 53°00′00″N 5°37′10″E	Grondzeiler	1873	Demolished post-1928.	
Tirns	Polder 274; 53°04′03″N 5°39′07″E	Spinnenkopmolen	Before 1832	Demolished 1922.	
Tirns	Polder 290; 53°03′27″N 5°38′55″E	Spinnenkopmolen	Before 1832	Demolished 1922.	
Tirns	Polder 291; 53°03′30″N 5°38′44″E	Spinnenkopmolen	Before 1832	Demolished 1922.	
Tirns	Polder 293; 53°03′52″N 5°38′54″E	Spinnenkopmolen	Before 1832	Demolishe 1922.	
Tirns	Polder 294; 53°03′56″N 5°38′05″E	Spinnenkopmolen	Before 1832	Demolishe d1922.	
Tirns	Polder 295; 53°03′40″N 5°38′00″E	Spinnenkopmolen	Before 1873	Demolished before 1928.	
Tirns	Polder 296; 53°03′48″N 5°38′30″E	Spinnenkopmolen	Before 1832	Demolishe d1923.	
Tirns	Polder 297; 53°03′26″N 5°37′49″E	Spinnenkopmolen	Before 1832	Demolished before 1928.	
Tirns	Polder 304; 53°03′03″N 5°37′37″E	Spinnenkopmolen	Before 1832	Demolished post-1930.	
Tirns	Polder 318; 53°03′14″N 5°37′02″E	Spinnenkopmolen	Before 1832	Demolished post-1930.	
Tirns	Polder 319; 53°03′35″N 5°37′14″E		Before 1832	Demolished before 1930.	
Tirns	Polder 320; 53°03′50″N 5°36′18″E	Spinnenkopmolen	Before 1832	Demolished post-1930.	
Tirns	Polder 321; 53°03′52″N 5°37′41″E		Before 1849	Demolished before 1908.	
Tirns	Polder 321a 53°04′05″N 5°37′25″E	Spinnenkopmolen	Before 1832	Demolished post-1850.	
Tirns	Polder 322; Polder Schaap; 53°03′57″N 5°37′45″E	Grondzeiler	Before 1849	Demolished post-1952.	
Tirns	Polder 322a 53°04′06″N 5°37′57″E	Spinnenkopmolen	Before 1832	Demolished before 1849.	
Tirns	Polder 324; 53°04′23″N 5°37′10″E	Spinnenkopmolen	Before 1832	Demolished post-1930.	
Tirns	Polder 325; 53°04′27″N 5°37′09″E	Spinnenkopmolen	Before 1873	Demolished post-1930.	
Tirns	Polder 326; 53°04′25″N 5°36′50″E	Spinnenkopmolen	Before 1832	Demolishe dpost-1930.	
Tjaard		Achtkantmolen		Moved to Bergwerd in 2000. Molendatabase (in Dutch)	
Tjalhuizum	Polder 81; 53°02′38″N 5°36′21″E	Spinnenkopmolen	Before 1832	Demolished post-1930.	
Tjalhuizum	Polder 305; 53°03′08″N 5°36′54″E	Spinnenkopmolen	Before 1832	Demolishe dpost-1930.	
Tjalleberd	Molen van Albert Wijnstra; 52°59′16″N 5°58′10″E		Before 1832	Demolished before 1850.	
Tjalleberd	Molen van Jan Krikke Jr. 53°00′40″N 5°55′59″E		Before 1832	Demolished before 1850.	
Tjalleberd	Molen van Jan Krikke Jr. 53°00′40″N 5°55′59″E		Before 1832	Demolished before 1850.	
Tjalleberd	Molen van Roelof Dam; 53°00′27″N 5°55′23″E		Before 1832	Demolished before 1850.	
Tjalleberd	Oudewegsterpolder; Agterste Molen; Buitenster Molen; De Hersteller; De Pijl; 53°01′24″N 5°56′43″E	Grondzeiler	1787	Moved to Luinjeberd 1854.	
Tjalleberd	Oudewegsterpolder; Molen P. Bles; De Beschermer; 53°01′09″N 5°56′51″E	Grondzeiler	1852	Demolished 1928, base remains.	
Tjalleberd	Rogmolen van Tjalleberd; 52°59′45″N 5°56′14″E	Standerdmolen	Before 1664	Demolished 1770.	
Tjalleberd	Veenpolder 6th & 7th District, part 128; 53°02′01″N 5°56′44″E	Weidemolen	Before 1877	Demolished before 1880.	
Tjalleberd	Vierde en Vijfde Veendistrict; De Droogmake; 53°01′01″N 5°56′31″E	Grondzeiler	1851	Moved to Terkaple 1884.	
Tjalleberd	Vierde en Vijfde Veendistrict; Molen Nr. 2; 53°01′21″N 5°56′12″E	Grondzeiler	1868	Demolished 1913.	
Tjalleberd	Vierde en Vijfde Veendistrict; Molen Nr. 3; 53°01′08″N 5°01′25″E	Grondzeiler	1835	Demolished 1913.	
Tjalleberd	53°00′11″N 5°56′49″E	Weidemolen	Before 1926.		
Tjerkgaast	De Noed Leijen; De Tragter; 52°54′50″N 5°43′08″E	Spinnenkopmolen	1850	Demolishe dbefore 1928.	
Tjerkgaast	Jellema's Molen; 52°54′02″N 5°42′35″E		1907	Demolilshed post-1934.	
Tjerkgaast	Molen van Ate Sijsma; 52°54′32″N 5°41′25″E	Spinnenkopmolen	Before 1832	Demolished before 1850.	
Tjerkgaast	Molen van Gebroeders Bouma; 52°54′24″N 5°42′53″E		Between 1850 and 1867	Demolished 1927.	
Tjerkgaast	Molen van Seerp Wierda; 52°54′01″N 5°40′38″E	Spinnenkopmolen	Before 1832	Demolished before 1850.	
Tjerkgaast	Polder 23; 52°54′29″N 5°42′29″E	Spinnenkopmolen	Before 1832	Demolished post-1850.	
Tjerkgaast	Polder 24a 52°54′42″N 5°41′50″E	Spinnenkopmolen	Before 1832	Demolished before 1928.	
Tjerkgaast	Polder 24a 52°54′19″N 5°42′19″E	Spinnenkopmolen	Before 1832	Demolished post-1930.	
Tjerkgaast	Polder 25; 52°54′18″N 5°41′45″E	Spinnenkopmolen	Before 1832	Demolished post-1930.	
Tjerkgaast	Polder 25a 52°54′15″N 5°41′34″E		Before 1832	Demolished post-1850.	
Tjerkgaast	Polder 25b 52°54′06″N 5°40′55″E	Spinnenkopmolen	Before 1832	Demolished post-1930.	
Tjerkgaast	Polder 26; 52°54′34″N 5°40′46″E	Spinnenkopmolen	Before 1832	Demolished post-1930.	
Tjerkgaast	Polder 26a 52°54′35″N 5°40′48″E		Before 1873	Demolished before 1930.	
Tjerkgaast	Polder 27; 52°54′26″N 5°40′36″E		Before 1832	Demolished post-1930.	
Tjerkgaast	Polder 27; 52°54′54″N 5°39′49″E		Before 1873	Demolished before 1930.	
Tjerkgaast	Polder 28; 52°54′21″N 5°40′28″E		Before 1873	Demolished before 1930.	
Tjerkgaast	Polder 28a Eendenkooi; 52°54′21″N 5°40′06″E		Before 1832	Demolished post-1850.	
Tjerkgaast	Polder 29; 52°53′59″N 5°40′18″E		Before 1873	Demolished before 1930.	
Tjerkgaast	Polder 29; 52°54′43″N 5°39′35″E		1850	Demolished before 1930.	
Tjerkgaast	Polder 30; 52°54′04″N 5°39′41″E		Before 1832	Demolished before 1930.	
Tjerkgaast	Polder 31; 52°53′58″N 5°39′23″E	Grondzeiler	Before 1832	Demolished post-1908.	
Tjerkgaast	Polder 35; 52°53′40″N 5°39′44″E		Before 1832	Demolished post-1908.	
Tjerkgaast	Polder 36; 52°54′05″N 5°40′53″E		Before 1832	Demolished before 1930.	
Tjerkgaast	52°53′52″N 5°40′27″E	Spinnenkopmolen	1875'	Demolished before 1933.	
Tjerkgaast	52°53′42″N 5°41′03″E		1880	Demolished before 1933.	
Tjerkgaast	52°53′51″N 5°40′01″E		Before 1908	Demolished before 1933.	
Tjerkgaast	52°54′13″N 5°41′41″E		1850	Demolished post-1930.	
Tjerkwerd	De Babuurstermolen; Beabuorster Mole; 53°03′00″N 5°29′57″E	Grondzeiler	1882		
Tjerkwerd	Babuursterpolder; 53°02′48″N 5°29′26″E	Spinnenkopmolen	Before 1832	Demolished before 1929.	
Tjerkwerd	Molen van Johannes Haitsma; 53°02′37″N 5°29′43″E		Before 1832	Demolishe dpost-1864.	
Tjerkwerd	Polder 11; 53°01′54″N 5°31′08″E	Spinnenkopmolen	Before 1832	Demolished before 1929.	
Tjerkwerd	Polder 11a 53°02′08″N 5°30′28″E	Spinnenkopmolen	Before 1832	Demolished before 1929.	
Tjerkwerd	Polder 411; 53°02′59″N 5°29′57″E		Before 1832	Demolished before 1850.	
Tjerkwerd	Polder 412; 53°03′03″N 5°29′34″E	Spinnenkopmolen	Before 1832	Demolished between 1850 and 1928.	
Tjerkwerd	Polder Senserhuizen; 53°01′55″N 5°32′05″E	Spinnenkopmolen	Before 1832	Demolished before 1929.	
Tjerkwerd	Tjerkwerderpolder; 53°02′24″N 5°30′16″E	Spinnenkopmolen	Before 1832	Demolished before 1929.	
Twijzel	53°13′54″N 6°05′22″E	Stellingmolen	1882	Demolished 1926.	
Twijzel	Rog Molen; 53°14′32″N 6°06′21″E	Standerdmolen	Before 1511	Demolished 1714.	
Twijzelerheide	Molen van Willem Smits; 53°14′29″N 6°01′27″E	Spinnenkopmolen	Before 1832	Demolished before 1850.	
Twijzelerheide	Polder 175; 53°14′12″N 6°01′35″E		Before 1850	Demolished before 1928.	
Twijzelerheide	Polder 175a 53°13′58″N 6°01′48″E		Before 1854	Demolished before 1926.	
Tytsjerk	De Himriksmole; De Groene Ster; 53°12′43″N 5°53′06″E	Spinnenkopmolen	1976	Burnt down 1995.	
Tytsjerk	De Himriksmole; De Groene Ster; 53°12′43″N 5°53′06″E	Spinnenkopmolen	1995		
Tytsjerk	De Lytse Geast; Swarte Prinsch; 53°12′00″N 5°52′02″E	Grondzeiler	1900		
Tytsjerk	Louwmeer Polder	Grondzeiler		Moved to Lekkum in 1825.	
Tytsjerk	Molen van Age Looxma; 53°12′56″N 5°54′07″E		Before 1832	Demolished before 1850.	
Tytsjerk	Molen van Anne Feenstra; 53°12′37″N 5°52′50″E		Before 1832	Demolished before 1850.	
Tytsjerk	Molen van Arjen Veninga; 53°12′44″N 5°51′26″E	Spinnenkopmolen	Before 1832	Demolished before 1850.	
Tytsjerk	Molen van de Buitenplaats Toutenburg; 53°12′53″N 5°53′52″E	Grondzeiler	1858	Moved to Ryptsjerk 1981.	
Tytsjerk	Molen van de School; 53°12′20″N 5°55′20″E		Before 1832	Demolished before 1850.	
Tytsjerk	Molen van Edzer Westera; 53°12′07″N 5°56′02″E		Before 1832	Demolished before 1850.	
Tytsjerk	Molen van Peus Reitsma; 53°12′23″N 5°56′18″E		Before 1832	Demolished before 1850.	
Tytsjerk	Molen van Eritia van Sminia; 53°12′09″N 5°51′54″E		Before 1832	Demolished before 1850.	
Tytsjerk	Molen van Hendrik Smidt; 53°12′07″N 5°56′01″E		Before 1832	Demolished before 1850.	
Tytsjerk	Molen van het St. Anthony Gasthuis; 53°11′29″N 5°53′41″E		Before 1832	Demolished before 1850.	
Tytsjerk	Molen van het St. Anthony Gasthuis; 53°11′21″N 5°53′37″E		Before 1832	Demolished before 1850.	
Tytsjerk	Molen van Jan Jellema; 53°11′41″N 5°56′08″E		Before 1832	Demolished before 1850.	
Tytsjerk	Molen van Jochum IJnia; 53°12′42″N 5°55′04″E		Before 1832	Demolished before 1850.	
Tytsjerk	Molen van Jr. Robert van Breugel; 53°11′23″N 5°55′01″E		Before 1832	Demolished before 1850.	
Tytsjerk	Molen van Julius Coulon; 53°11′02″N 5°52′58″E	Spinnenkopmolen	Beforfe 1832	Demolished before 1850.	
Tytsjerk	Molen van Klaas Meindersma; 53°11′49″N 5°54′21″E		Before 1832	Demolished before 1850.	
Tytsjerk	Molen van Pieter Snoek; 53°12′34″N 5°55′14″E		Before 1832	Demolished before 1850.	
Tytsjerk	Molen van Rindert Algra; 53°10′58″N 5°52′15″E		Before 1832	Denolished before 1850.	
Tytsjerk	Molen van Salomon Leeuwensten; 53°12′57″N 5°54′25″E		Before 1832	Demolished before 1850.	
Tytsjerk	Molen van Sjoerd Miedema; 53°10′16″N 5°52′09″E	Spinnenkopmolen	Before 1832		
Tytsjerk	Polder 73; 53°10′59″N 5°52′59″E		Before 1850	Demolished post-1926.	
Tytsjerk	Polder 74; 53°10′44″N 5°52′11″E	Spinnenkopmolen	Before 1832	Demolished post-1925.	
Tytsjerk	Polder 75; 53°10′56″N 5°51′58″E	Spinnenkopmolen	Before 1832	Demolished post-1925.	
Tytsjerk	Polder 76; 53°11′05″N 5°51′34″E	Grondzeiler	Before 1874	Demolished before 1924.	
Tytsjerk	Oud Polder 78; 53°11′41″N 5°54′21″E		Before 1832	Demolished between 1864 and 1874.	
Tytsjerk	Nieuw Polder 78; 53°11′33″N 5°53′30″E	Grondzeiler	1903	Burnt down 1944.	
Tytsjerk	Polder 78a 53°11′37″N 5°54′52″E	Spinnenkopmolen	Before 1832	Demolished post-1850.	
Tytsjerk	Polder 79; 53°11′54″N 5°54′35″E		Before 1850	Demolished post-1930.	
Tytsjerk	Polder 80; 53°12′05″N 5°53′41″E		Before 1832	Demolished post-1930.	
Tytsjerk	Polder 81; 53°11′42″N 5°53′25″E	Spinnenkopmolen	Before 1832	Demolished before 1850.	
Tytsjerk	Polder 81a 53°11′42″N 5°53′10″E		1832	Demolished post-1874.	
Tytsjerk	Polder 82; 53°12′01″N 5°53′00″E	Spinnenkopmolen	Before 1832	Demolished post-1850.	
Tytsjerk	Polder 83; 53°11′50″N 5°51′36″E		Before 1832	Demolished post-1874.	
Tytsjerk	Polder 84; 53°11′30″N 5°51′27″E		Before 1832	Demolished c.1926.	
Tytsjerk	Polder 86; 53°12′10″N 5°51′36″E		Before 1832	Demolished post-1874.	
Tytsjerk	Oud Polder 87; 53°12′00″N 5°52′02″E		Before 1832	Demolished 1900.	
Tytsjerk	Polder 88; 53°11′55″N 5°52′14″E	Spinnenkopmolen	Before 1832	Demolished post-1850.	
Tytsjerk	Polder 89; 53°12′04″N 5°53′14″E		Before 1832	Demolished post-1874.	
Tytsjerk	Polder 90; 53°12′25″N 5°52′17″E	Grondzeiler	Before 1832	Demolished post-1929.	
Tytsjerk	Polder 91; 53°12′33″N 5°51′31″E	Grondzeiler	Before 1832	Demolished between 1874 and 1930.	
Tytsjerk	Polder 92; 53°12′43″N 5°51′42″E		1850	Demolished post-1874.	
Tytsjerk	Polder 93; Polder Roozendaal; 53°12′57″N 5°52′12″E		1850	Demolished post-1914.	
Tytsjerk	Polder 118; 53°12′58″N 5°54′57″E		Before 1832	Demolished post-1874.	
Tytsjerk	Polder 119; 53°12′55″N 5°55′02″E		1850	Demolished post -1874.	
Tytsjerk	Polder 120; 53°12′45″N 5°54′23″E		Before 1832	Demolished post-1874.	
Tytsjerk	Polder 121; 53°12′37″N 5°54′07″E	Spinnenkopmolen	Before 1832	Demolished post-1874.	
Tytsjerk	Polder 122; 53°12′37″N 5°54′49″E	Spinnenkopmolen	Before 1832	Demolished post-1850.	
Tytsjerk	Polder 122; 53°12′32″N 5°54′51″E	Grondzeiler	Before 1854	Demolished before 1926.	
Tytsjerk	Polder 123; 53°12′42″N 5°55′13″E		Before 1850	Demolished post-1874.	
Tytsjerk	Polder 124; 53°12′25″N 5°55′20″E		Before 1832	Demolished before 1928.	
Tytsjerk	Polder 125; 53°12′13″N 5°55′26″E		Before 1832	Demolished post-1874.	
Tytsjerk	Polder 127; 53°12′01″N 5°55′48″E		Before 1832	Demolished before 1850.	
Tytsjerk	Polder 128; 53°11′55″N 5°55′46″E		Before 1832	Demolished before 1850.	
Tytsjerk	Polder 128a 53°11′54″N 5°55′44″E		1854	Demolished before 1926.	
Tytsjerk	Polder 128b 53°11′51″N 5°55′50″E		1854	Demolished before 1926.	
Tytsjerk	Polder 129; 53°12′07″N 5°55′59″E		Before 1864	Demolished before 1926.	
Tytsjerk	Polder 130; 53°11′37″N 5°56′19″E		Before 1854	Demolished before 1926.	
Tzum	Teetlum; Duivenhok; 53°08′00″N 5°35′02″E	Spinnenkop	1800		
Tzum	Barrumerpolder; 53°09′03″N 5°33′23″E	Grondzeiler	1809	Demolished 1933.	
Tzum	Deersumerpolder; 53°08′56″N 5°30′36″E	Grondzeiler	Before 1832	Demolished post-1850.	
Tzum	Fiersumerpolder; 53°09′52″N 5°34′10″E		Before 1832	Demolished before 1928.	
Tzum	Holprijpsterpolder; Vliegerpolder; 53°09′38″N 5°32′58″E		1819	Demolished 1906.	
Tzum	Korenmolen van Tzum; 53°09′26″N 5°33′43″E	Standerdmolen	Before 1514	Demolished post-1791.	
Tzum	Molen van Alexander van Giffen; 53°08′45″N 5°30′09″E	Spinnenkopmolen	Before 1832	Demolished post-1850.	
Tzum	Molen van D. Bruinsma; 53°09′07″N 5°35′15″E	Grondzeiler	Before 1932	Demolished between 1941 and 1949.	
Tzum	Molen van Foeke Jans Wiena; 53.°N 5.°E	Spinnenkopmolen	Before 1832	17938.	
Tzum	Molen van Freerk Fontein; 53°07′59″N 5°33′56″E	Spinnenkopmolen	Before 1832	Demolished post-1850.	
Tzum	Molen van Harmen Koopmans; 53°08′48″N 5°35′55″E		Before 1832	Burnt down 1857.	
Tzum	Molen van Jacob Holkeboer; 53°09′05″N 5°35′04″E	Spinnenkopmolen	Before 1832	Demolished between 1864 and 1873.	
Tzum	Molen van Jan Deketh; 53°08′08″N 5°34′52″E	Spinnenkopmolen	Before 1832	Demolished before 1850.	
Tzum	Molen van Jan Dijkstra; 53°08′58″N 5°30′06″E	Spinnenkopmolen	Before 1832	Demolished before 1850.	
Tzum	Molen van Kest Koopman; 53°09′38″N 5°34′24″E	Spinnenkopmolen	Before 1832	Demolished post-1850.	
Tzum	Polder 1; 53°09′04″N 5°31′01″E		Before 1832	Demolished before 1850.	
Tzum	Polder 2; 53°09′01″N 5°31′37″E	Spinnenkopmolen	Before 1832	Demolished c.1906.	
Tzum	Polder 23; 53°08′05″N 5°33′45″E	Spinnenkopmolen	Before 1832	Demolished post-1932.	
Tzum	Polder 24; 53°08′14″N 5°33′53″E		Before 1832	Demolished post-1930.	
Tzum	Polder 25; 53°08′11″N 5°34′23″E	Grondzeiler	Before 1832	Demolished between 1943 and 1957.	
Tzum	Polder 27; 53°08′25″N 5°34′43″E	Spinnenkopmolen	Before 1832	Demolished post-1850.	
Tzum	Polder 28; 53°08′28″N 5°34′34″E		Before 1832	Burnt down 1914.	
Tzum	Fatum; 53°08′28″N 5°34′34″E	Spinnenkop	1914		
Tzum	Polder 29; 53°08′37″N 5°34′14″E	Spinnenkopmolen	1800	Moved to Earnewâld 1958.	
Tzum	Polder 30; 53°08′33″N 5°33′41″E	Spinnenkopmolen	Before 1832	Demolished before 1928.	
Tzum	Polder 31; Elbe; 53°08′37″N 5°33′23″E	Spinnenkopmolen	Before 1832	Demolished post-1850.	
Tzum	Polder 32; 53°08′22″N 5°32′49″E	Spinnenkopmolen	Before 1832	Demolished before 1928.	
Tzum	Polder 33; 53°08′37″N 5°32′50″E		Before 1932	Demolished before 1928.	
Tzum	Polder 34; 53°09′07″N 5°34′16″E	Spinnenkopmolen	Before 1832	Demolished post-1930.	
Tzum	Polder 35; 53°08′50″N 5°34′19″E	Spinnenkopmolen	Before 1832	Demolished post-1873.	
Tzum	Polder 36; 53°08′56″N 5°35′16″E	Grondzeiler	Before 1873	Demolished 1943.	
Tzum	Polder 37; 53°09′11″N 5°34′52″E		Before 1832	Demolished c.1906.	
Tzum	Polder 38; 53°09′16″N 5°34′56″E	Grondzeiler	Before 1852	Demolished 1902.	
Tzum	Polder 40; 53°08′55″N 5°35′35″E	Spinnenkopmolen	1843	Blown down 1949.	
Tzum	Polder 41; 53°08′44″N 5°35′05″E	Spinnenkopmolen	Before 1832	Demolished post-1943.	
Tzum	Polder Laakwerd; 53°09′02″N 5°32′38″E		1812	Demolished before 1928.	
Tzum	53°08′45″N 5°34′13″E	Spinnenkopmolen	Between 1873 and 1878	Demolished 1929.	
Tzum	Polder Vlaren; 53°09′03″N 5°32′38″E	Spinnenkopmolen	Before 1832	Demolished before 1928.	
Tzum	Tzummerpolder; Tjummerpolder; 53°09′35″N 5°34′03″E		Before 1832	Demolished before 1850.	
Tzummarum	De Windlust; Molen van Mourik; 53°14′13″N 5°31′57″E	Stellingmolen	1852/53	Demolished 1915.	
Tzummarum	Korenmolen van Tzummarum; 53°14′23″N 5°32′48″E	Standerdmolen	Before 1511	Demolished 1761.	
Tzummarum	Molen van C. E. E. d'Escury; 53°13′53″N 5°32′11″E	Spinnenkopmolen	Before 1832	demolished before 1850.	
Tzummarum	Molem vam C. E. E. d'Escury; 53°13′33″N 5°33′45″E	Spinnenkopmolen	Before 1832	Demolished 1851.	
Tzummarum	Molen van Jelte de Haan; 53°13′54″N 5°31′53″E		Before 1832	Demolished before 1850.	
Tzummarum	Molen van Tjeerd Hibma; 53°13′58″N 5°32′40″E		Before 1832	Demolished post-1850.	
Tzummarum	Molen van Wietse Bruinsma; 53°14′17″N 5°33′18″E		Before 1832	Demolished before 1850.	
Tzummarum	Polder 1; 53°14′29″N 5°32′13″E	Grondzeiler	Before 1832	Demolished post-1850.	
Tzummarum	Polder 2; 53°15′06″N 5°31′47″E	Grondzeiler	Before 1832	Demolished before 1928.	
Tzummarum	Polder 29; 53°14′24″N 5°33′34″E	Grondzeiler	Before 1832	Demolished post-1850.	
Tzummarum	Polder Oosterbierum; Noordelijke Molen; 53°15′01″N 5°31′21″E	Grondzeiler	Before 1832	Demolished post-1930.	
Tzummarum	Tjummarumer Miedpolder; 53°13′33″N 5°33′45″E	Grondzeiler	1851	Dempolished 1942.	

== U ==
Location	Name of mill	Type	Built	Notes	Photograph
Uitwellingerga	Zuidelijke Molen	Iron windpump	1929		
Uitwellingerga	Geeuwpolder; Norderlijke Molen; 53°00′41″N 5°00′00″E	Iron windpump	1929		
Uitwellingerga	Polder 135; 53°00′18″N 5°42′41″E		Before 1832	Demolished before 1929.	
Uitwellingerga	Polder 136; 53°00′08″N 5°41′46″E		Before 1832	Demolished before 1929.	
Uitwellingerga	Polder 156; 52°59′56″N 5°41′29″E		Before 1832	Demolished before 1929.	
Uitwellingerga	Polder 157; 52°59′57″N 5°42′08″E		Before 1832	Demolished before 1929.	
Uitwellingerga	Polder 158; 52°59′43″N 5°41′33″E		Before 1832	Demolished before 1929.	
Uitwellingerga	Polder 159; 52°59′58″N 5°42′34″E	Spinnenkopmolen	Before 1832	Demolished post-1928.	
Uitwellingerga	Polder 160; 52°59′52″N 5°42′43″E	Spinnenkopmolen	Before 1832	Demolished before 1929.	
Uitwellingerga	Polder 161; 52°59′40″N 5°42′52″E	Spinnenkopmolen	Before 1832	Demolished 1938.	
Uitwellingerga	Polder 166; 52°59′59″N 5°43′02″E		Before 1832	Demolished before 1929.	
Uitwellingerga	Polder 167; 53°00′15″N 5°42′47″E		Before 1832	Demolished before 1929.	
Uitwellingerga	Polder 168; 53°00′07″N 5°43′18″E		Before 1832	Demolished before 1929.	
Ureterp	De Bruinvis; 53°05′47″N 6°10′08″E	Stellingmolen	1872	Move to Zaandam, North Holland 2007, base remains standing.	
Ureterp	De Welkomst; 53°05′38″N 6°11′38″E	Stellingmolen	1898	Demolished c.1930. Some remains standing 1949.	
Ureterp	Korenmolen van Ureterp; 53°05′19″N 6°10′30″E	Standerdmolen	Before 1630	Demolished post-1874.	
Ureterp	Polder 4; 53°04′58″N 6°07′17″E		Before 1877	Demolished before 1926.	
Ureterp	Polder 4; 53°05′05″N 6°08′05″E		Before 1850	Demolished before 1877.	
Ureterp	Polder 5; 53°05′05″N 6°08′05″E		Before 1850	Demolished before 1877.	
Ureterp	Polder; 53°06′14″N 6°09′26″E	Weidemolen	1850	Demolished post-1877.	
Ureterp	Polder A 53°05′45″N 6°08′22″E	Weidemolen	1850	Demolished post-1877.	
Ureterp	Volmolen; 53°05′47″N 6°10′08″E	Standerdmolen	Between 1644 and 1680		

== V ==
Location	Name of mill	Type	Built	Notes	Photograph
Vegelinsoord	De Deels; Douwemûne; Grevensmolen; 53°01′03″N 5°51′21″E	Grondzeiler	1860		
Vegelinsoord	Binnengreven; 53°00′21″N 5°50′54″E		1877	Demolished post-1929.	
Vegelinsoord	Haskerveenpolder; Geeuwsmolen; Nr. 3; 52°59′51″N 5°52′11″E	Grondzeiler	1868	Demolished 1918.	
Vegelinsoord	Molen van Auke Boetje; 53°00′55″N 5°51′29″E		Before 1832	Demolished before 1850.	
Vegelinsoord	Molen van Jr. Vegelin van Claerbergen; 53°01′54″N 5°50′03″E		Before 1832	Demolished post-1850.	
Vegelinsoord	Molen van Jr. Vegelin van Claerbergen; 53°01′28″N 5°50′49″E		Before 1832	Demolished before 1850.	
Vegelinsoord	Molen van Jr. Vegeli van Claerbergen; 53°01′04″N 5°51′11″E		Before 1832	Demolished before 1850.	
Vegelinsoord	Polder 123a 53°01′08″N 5°50′18″E	Spinnenkopmolen	Before 1877	Demolished before 1924.	
Vegelinsoord	Polder Aa; 53°01′07″N 5°51′16″E				
Vierhuis	Groote Sint Johannesgaster Veenpolder; Veldzigt; 52°53′52″N 5°51′28″E	Grondzeiler	1857	Demolished 1932.	
Vierhuis	Molen van Lukas de Boer; 52°53′56″N 5°51′15″E		Before 1832	Demolished before 1850.	
Vierhuis	Polder 15; 52°54′04″N 5°51′13″E	Grondzeiler	Before 1877	Demolished before 1932.	
Vierhuis	52°54′24″N 5°50′50″E	Tjasker	Before 1877	Demolished post-1932.	
Vierhuis	52°54′21″N 5°50′46″E	Tjasker	1877	Demolished before 1932.	
Vinkega	Korenmolen van Vinkega; 52°52′27″N 6°06′38″E		Before 1664	Demolished before 1718.	
Vinkega	Polder 12; 52°52′38″N 6°05′43″E		1877	Demolished before 1922.	
Vinkega	Polder 13; 52°52′39″N 6°05′46″E		Before 1877	Demolished before 1922.	
Vlieland	Korenmolen van West Vlieland; 53°14′29″N 4°51′52″E	Standerdmolen	Before 1553	Blown down 1714.	
Vrouwenparochie	Nije Molen; Vrouwbuurtstermolen; 53°16′50″N 5°43′17″E	Standerdmolen	1555	Demolished post-1682.	
Vrouwenparochie	De Vrouwbuurtstermolen; 53°16′50″N 5°43′17″E	Stellingmolen	1862		
Vrouwenparochie	Polder 8; 53°17′13″N 5°43′05″E	Grondzeiler	Between 1811 and 1850	Demolished 1935.	

== Notes ==
Mills still standing marked in bold. Known building dates are bold, otherwise the date is the earliest known date the mill was standing.
