= Terkaple =

- Village
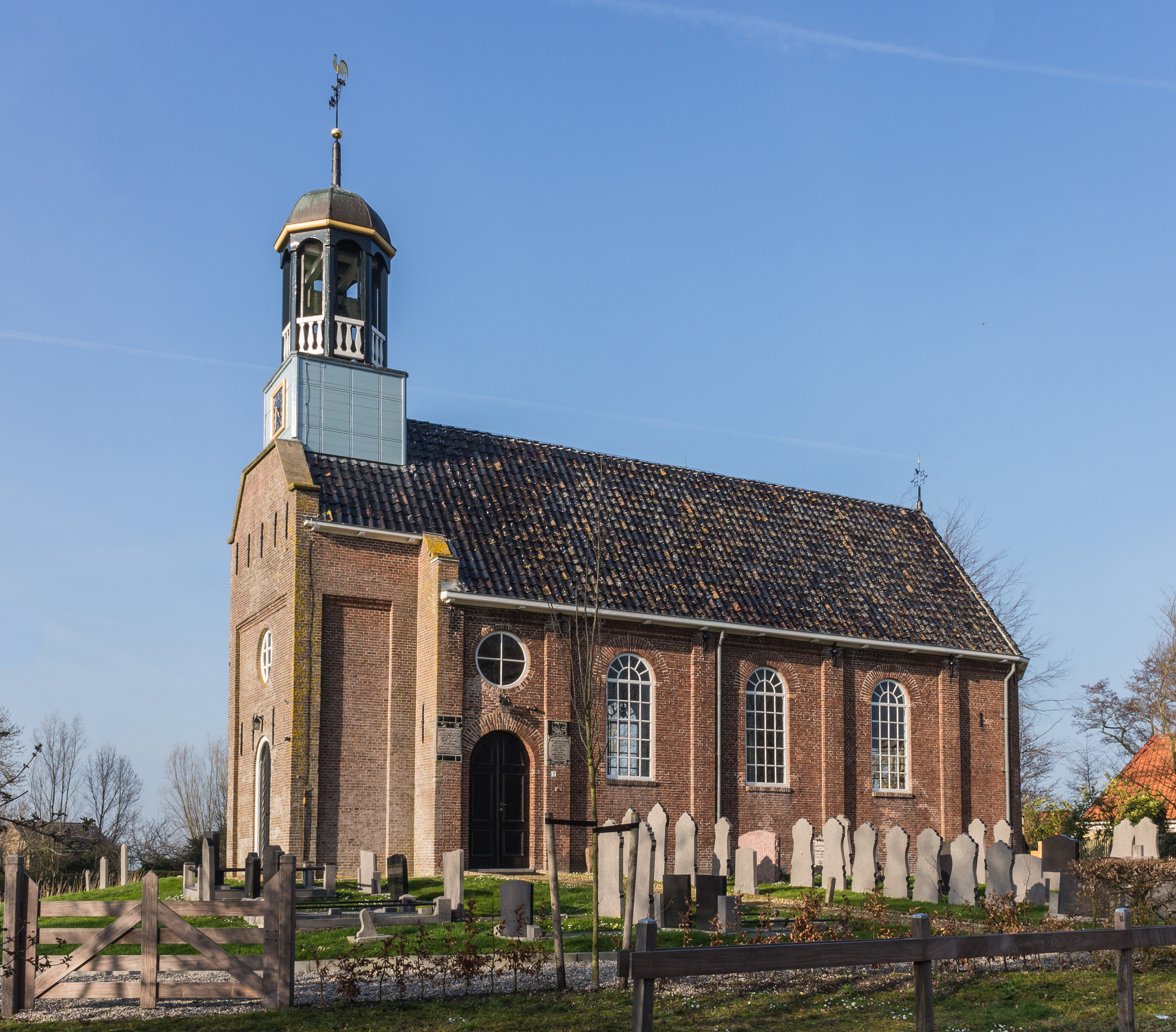
- Dutch Reformed Church

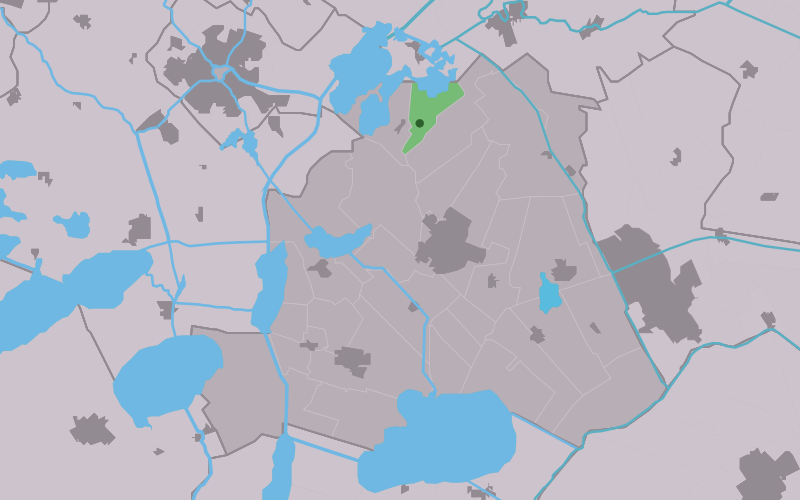
- Location in the former Skarsterlân municipality

- Location in the Netherlands Terkaple (Netherlands)
- Country: Netherlands
- Province: Friesland
- Municipality: De Fryske Marren

Area
  - Total: 4.25 km^{2} (1.64 sq mi)
- Elevation: 0.0 m (0 ft)

Population (2021)
  - Total: 240
  - Density: 56/km^{2} (150/sq mi)
- Time zone: UTC+1 (CET)
  - Summer (DST): UTC+2 (CEST)
- Postal code: 8542
- Dialing code: 0566

Terkaple is a village in De Fryske Marren municipality in the province of Friesland, the Netherlands. It had a population of around 220 in 2017.

== History ==
It was first mentioned in the 13th century Cappelghe, and means chapel. It refers to a private chapel by the Oenema family near their house. Most of the land around Terkaple and the neighbouring villages of Terherne and Akmarijp were owned by the Oeneme family. The Dutch Reformed Church was built in 1854 as a replacement of a medieval church on the same location of the chapel. In 1840, Terkaple was home to 107 people.

Before 2014, Terkaple was part of the Skarsterlân municipality and before 1984 it was part of Utingeradeel.

== Gallery ==
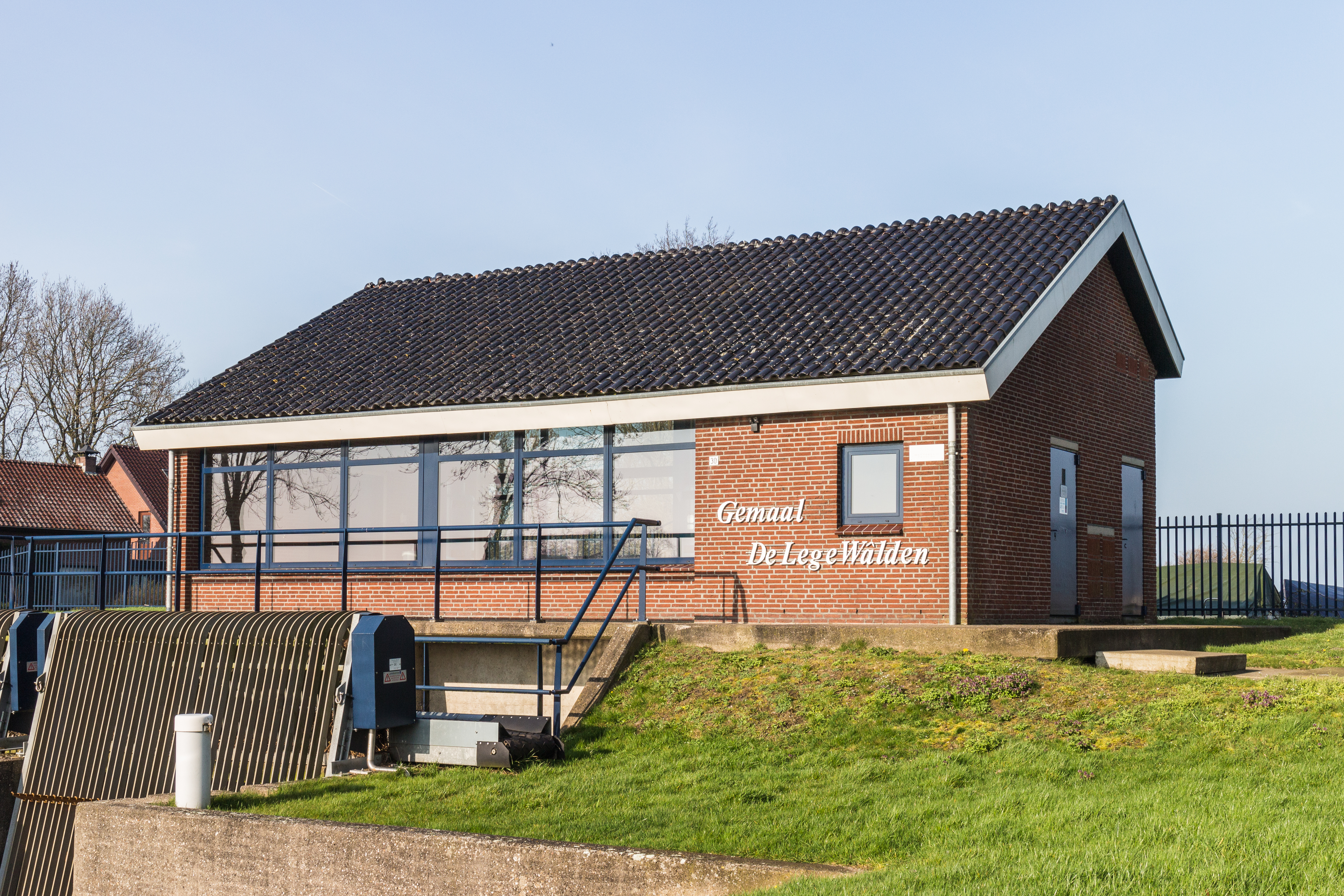
Pumping station

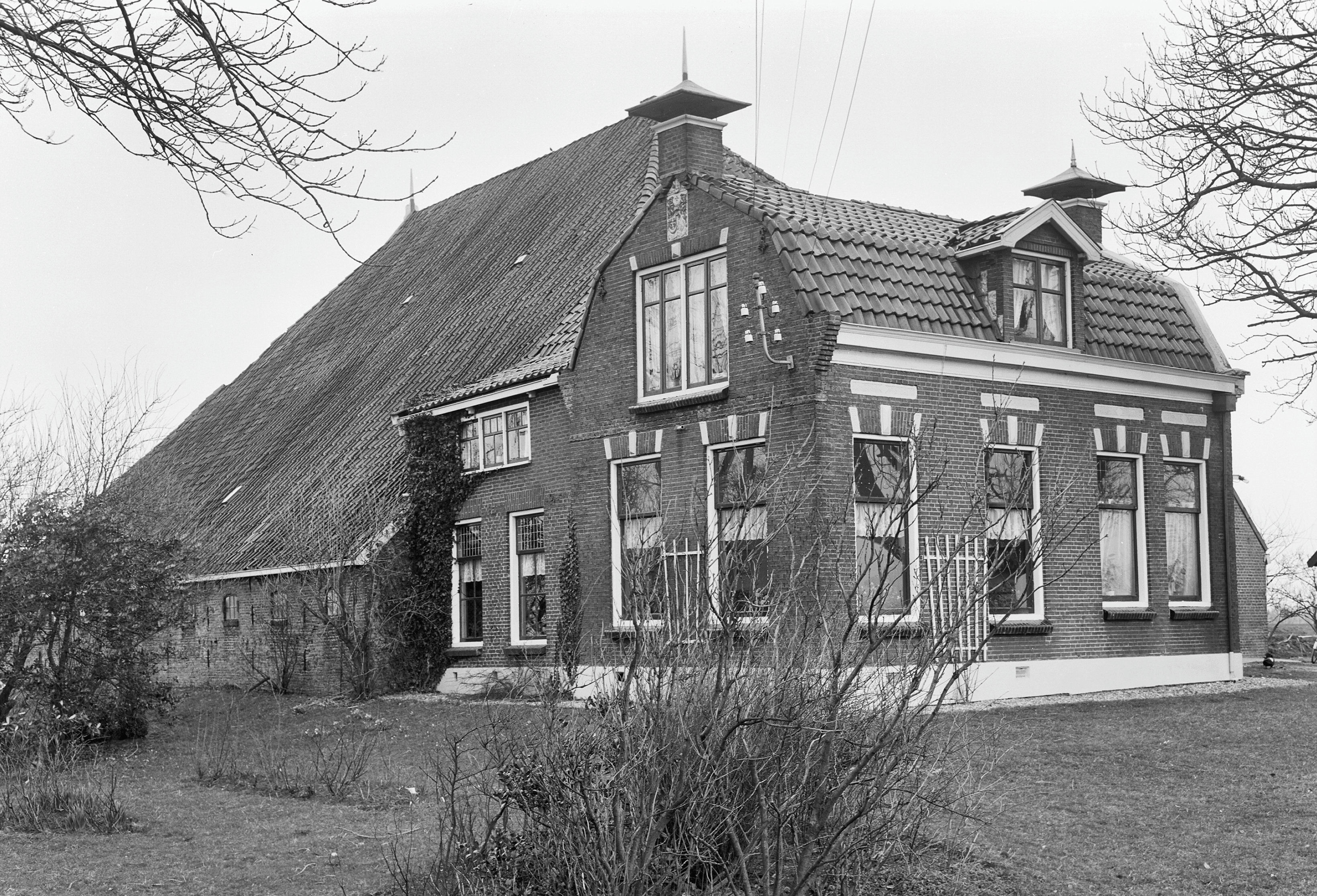
Oenemastate

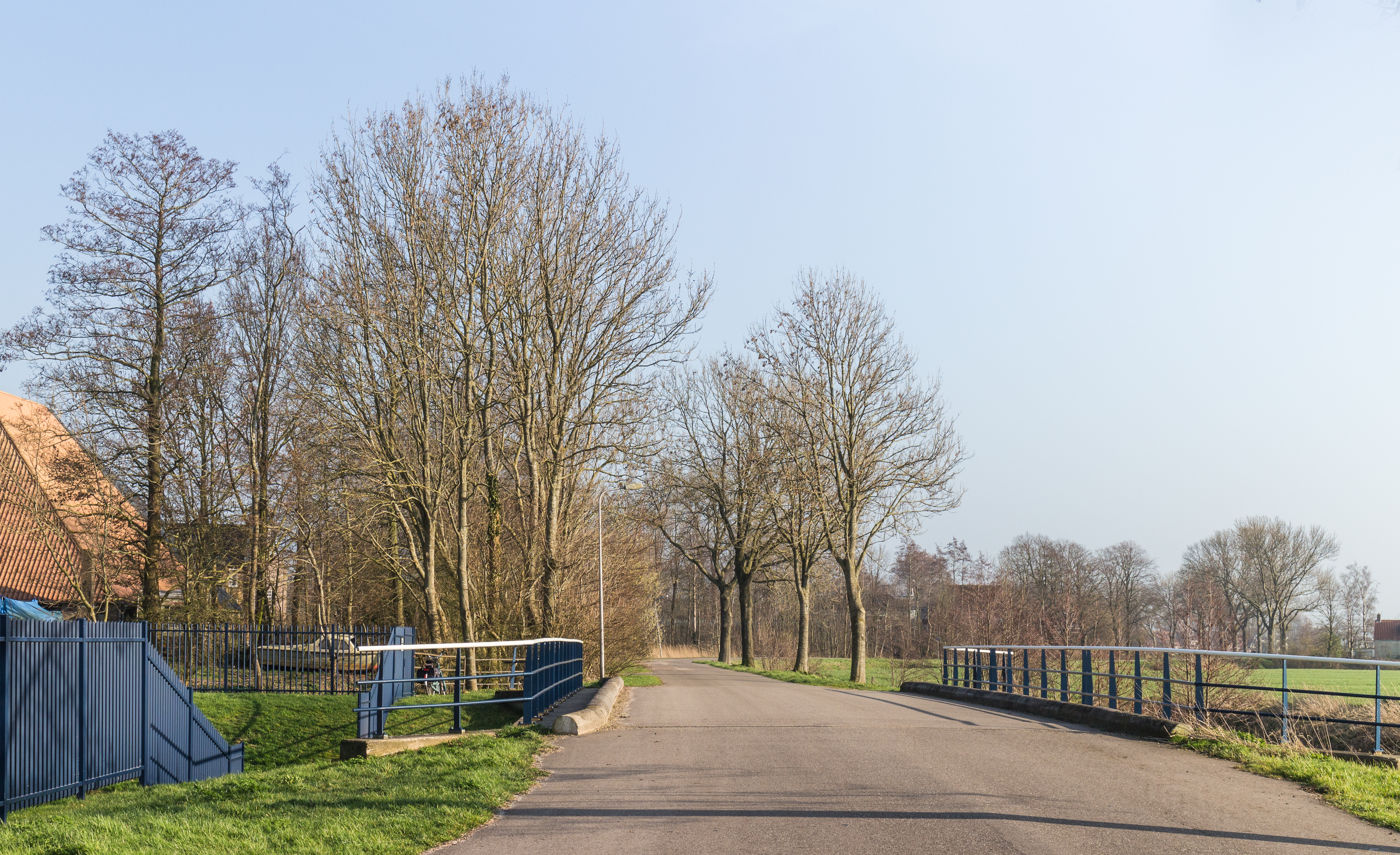
Street view

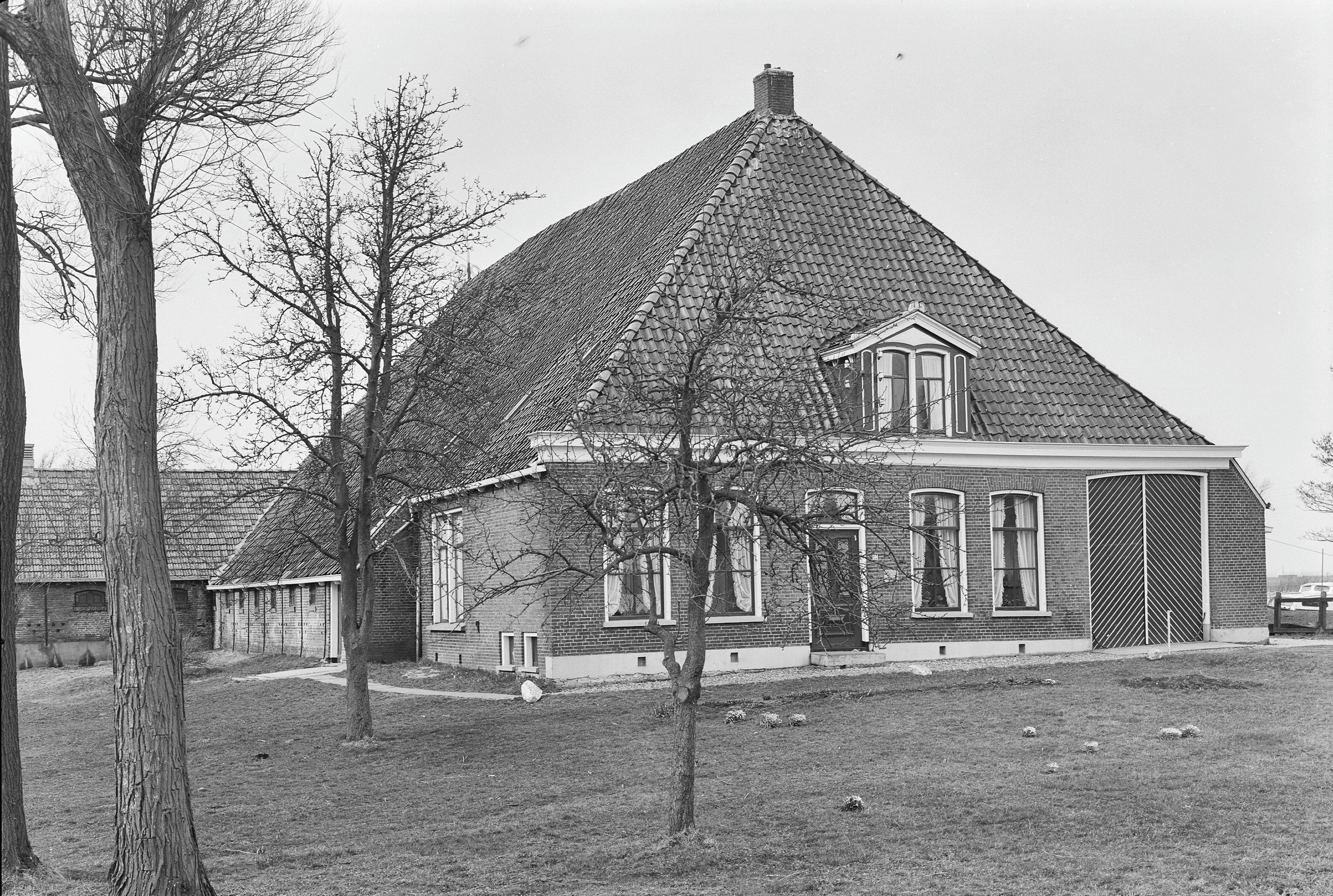
Farm in Terkaple
