= Utingeradeel =

Dissolved municipality of Friesland, Netherlands

Utingeradeel Utingeradiel
- Former municipality
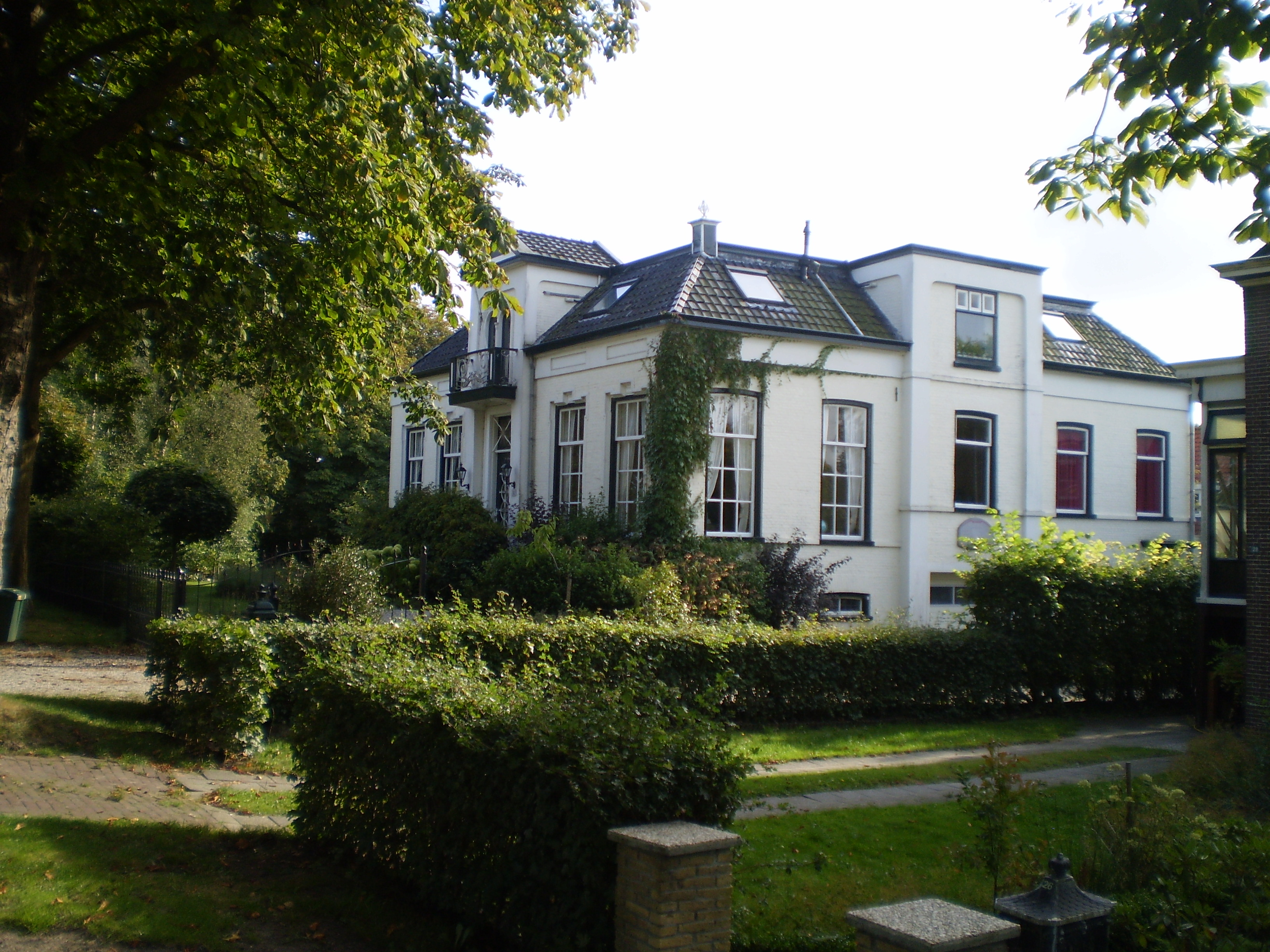

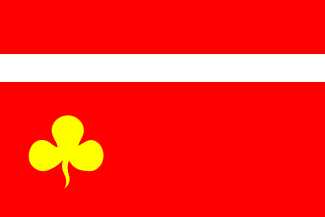
- Flag Coat of arms

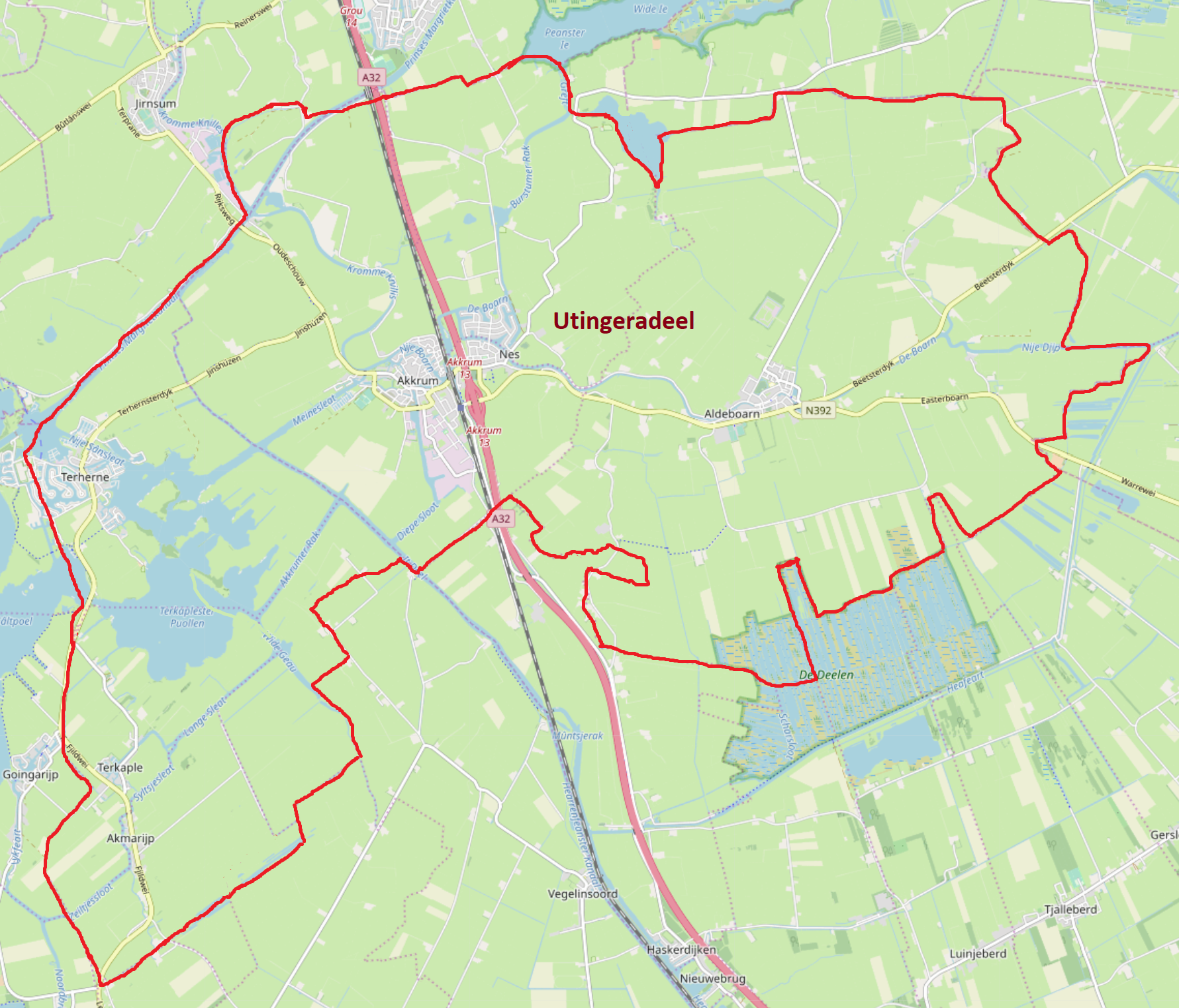
- Location in Friesland
- Coordinates: 53°02′54″N 5°50′16″E
- Country: Netherlands
- Province: Friesland
- Established: 1 October 1816
- Dissolved: 1 January 1984

Area
  - Total: 152.50 km^{2} (58.88 sq mi)

Population (1980)
  - Total: 5,369
  - Density: 35.21/km^{2} (91.2/sq mi)
- Time zone: UTC+1 (CET)
  - Summer (DST): UTC+2 (CEST)

Utingeradeel (West Frisian: Utingeradiel) is a former municipality in the province of Friesland in the Netherlands.

The municipality was split into two parts on 1 January 1984, Boornsterhem and Skarsterlân.

== Population centres ==
The municipality of Utingeradeel contained six villages as of its dissolution in 1983. Its capital was Oldeboorn until 1932, followed by Akkrum.

Dutch Name	West Frisian
Akkrum	Akkrum
Oldeboorn	Aldeboarn
Terhorne	Terherne
Terkaple	Terkaple
Nes	Nes
Akmarijp	Eagmaryp

There were also a number of hamlets in the municipality; Birstum, Henshuizen, Oude Schouw, Poppenhuizen, Sorremorre and Warniahuizen.
