= Aldeboarn =

Oldeboorn Aldeboarn
- Village
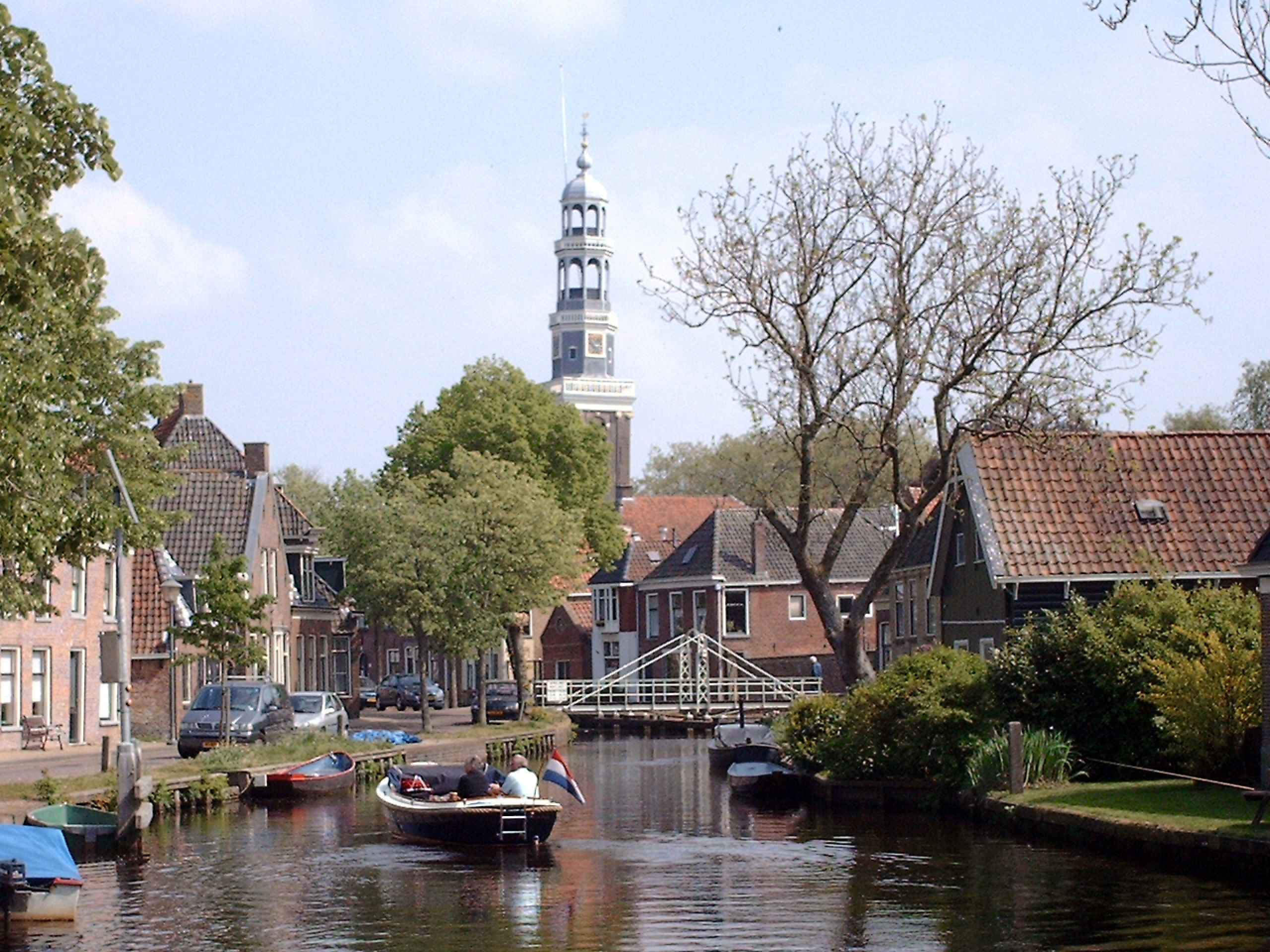

- Flag Coat of arms

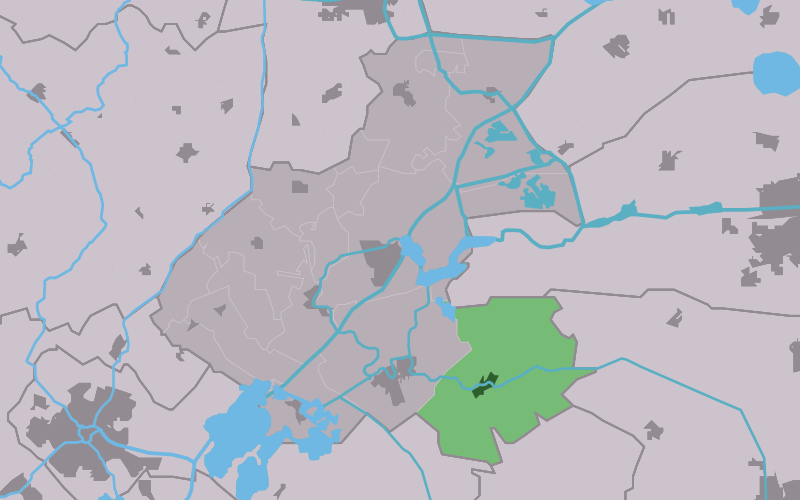
- Location in the former Boarnsterhim municipality

- Location in the Netherlands Oldeboorn (Netherlands)
- Country: Netherlands
- Province: Friesland
- Municipality: Heerenveen

Area
  - Total: 27.24 km^{2} (10.52 sq mi)
- Elevation: 0.1 m (0.33 ft)

Population (2021)
  - Total: 1,550
  - Density: 56.9/km^{2} (147/sq mi)
- Time zone: UTC+1 (CET)
  - Summer (DST): UTC+2 (CEST)
- Postal code: 8495
- Dialing code: 0566

Aldeboarn (Dutch: Oldeboorn) is a village in Heerenveen in the province of Friesland, the Netherlands. It had a population of around 1545 in January 2017. Aldeboarn has an iconic church tower.

== History ==
The village was first mentioned in 1243 as "jn Bornde". "Boarn" is a river name which means bank. Alde (old) is usually added to distinguish from another village perhaps Oosterboorn. Aldeboard developed in the 11th or 12th century along the Boorne river as an elongated terp (artificial living mound) village. It became a trading place, and developed into a regional centre.

Aldeboarn used to have a medieval church. In 1723, the tower was struck by lightning. In 1737, the iconic tower of the Doelhof Church was finished. It is a slender tower with crown consisting of a three-story wooden lantern with one closed and two open pavillons. The tower is leaning slightly and has a displacement of 1.5 metres (4 ft 11 in). In 1753, a new church was added to the tower.

The weigh house is a corner building from 1736 and houses the local museum. In 1840, Aldeboard was home to 1,485 people.

Before 2014, Aldeboarn was part of the Boarnsterhim municipality and before 1984 it was part of Utingeradeel.

== People ==
- Makke Groen, speed skater kortebaanschaatsen

== Gallery ==
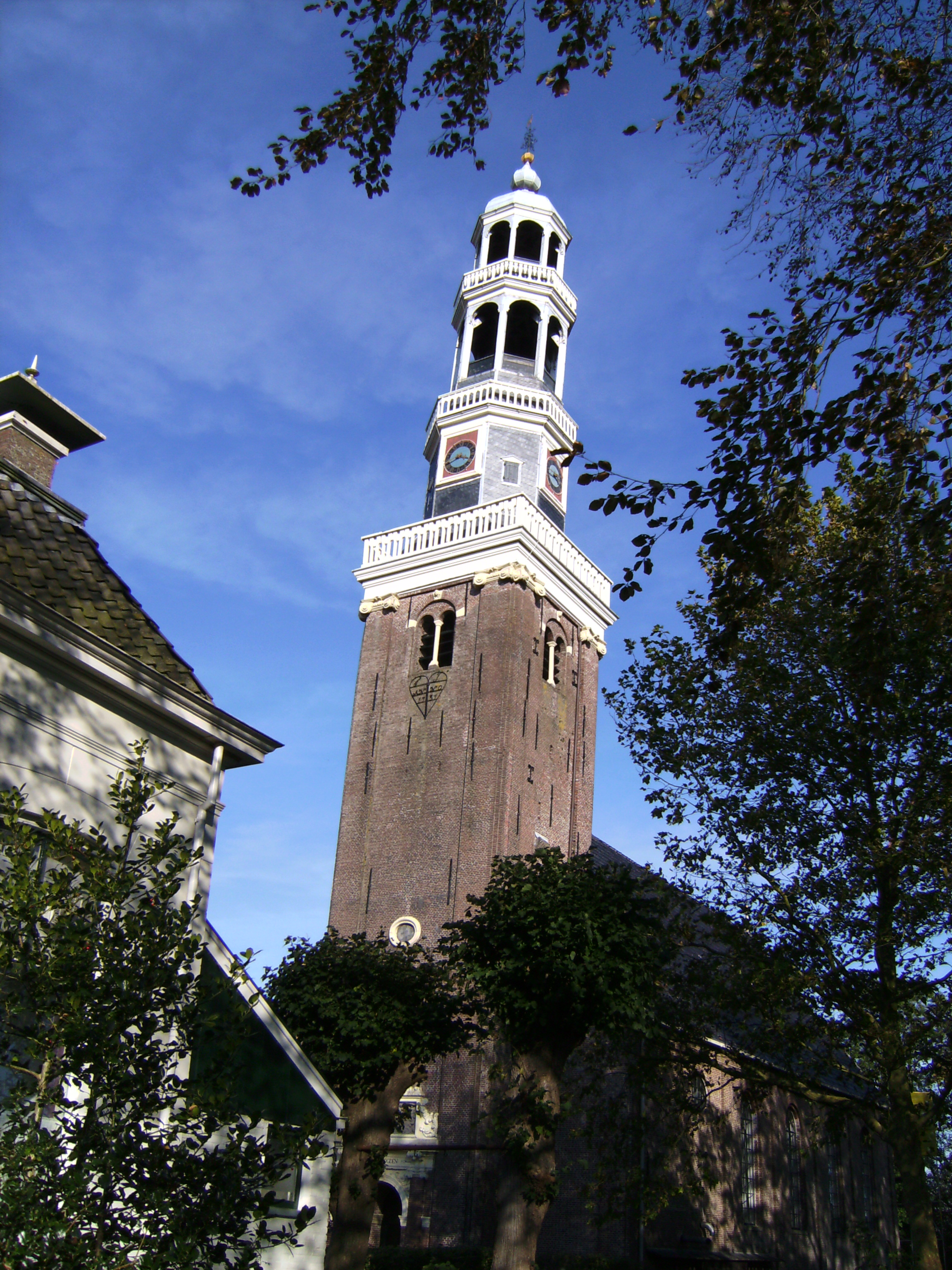
Tower of the Doelhof Church

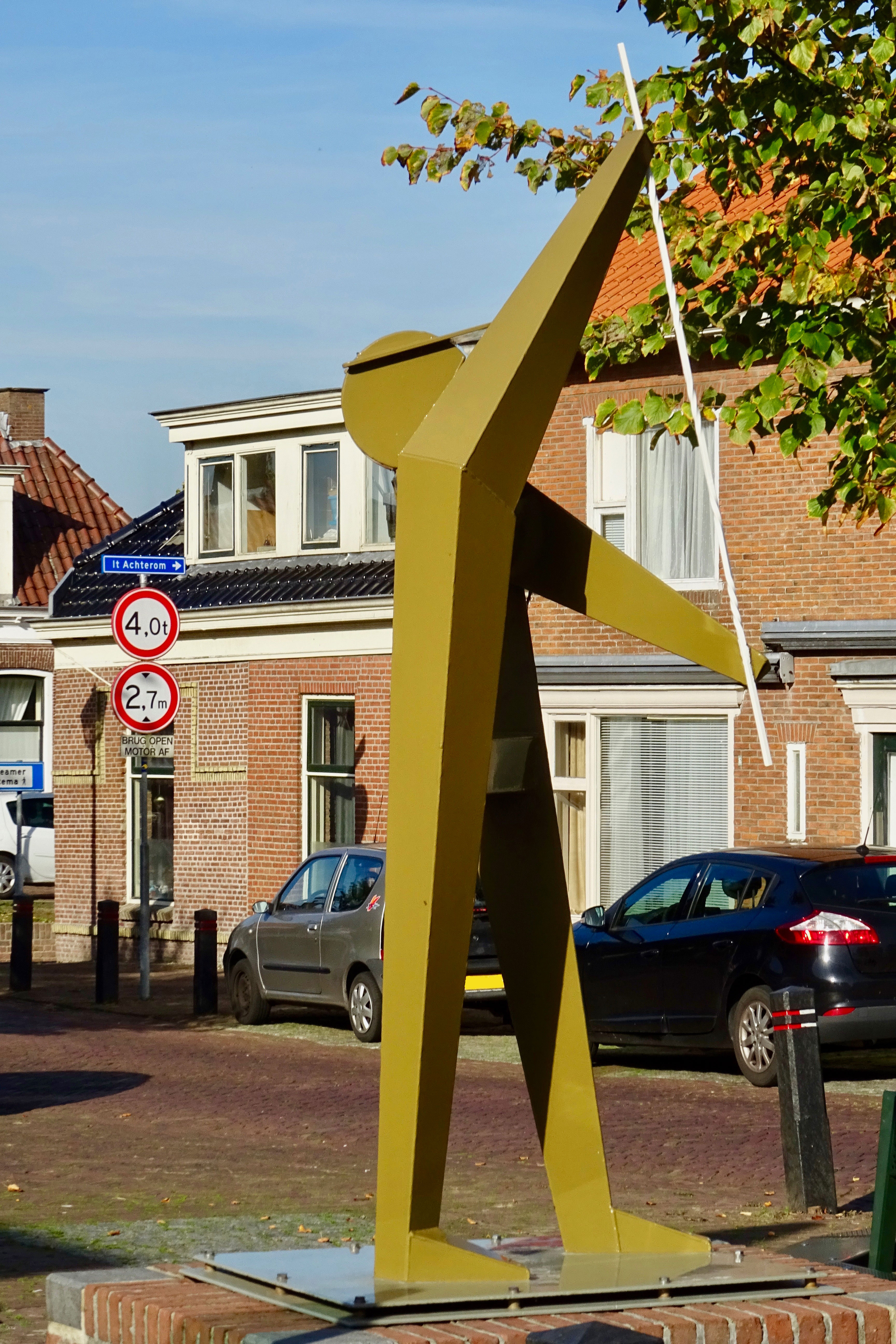
Art in Aldeboard

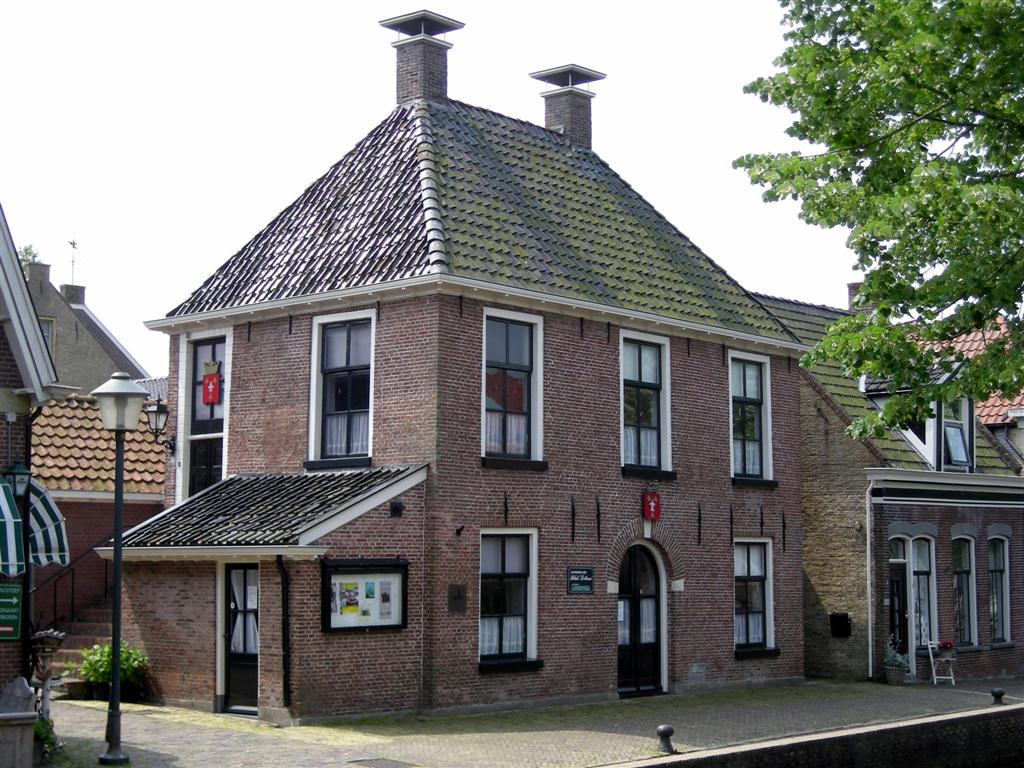
Weigh house

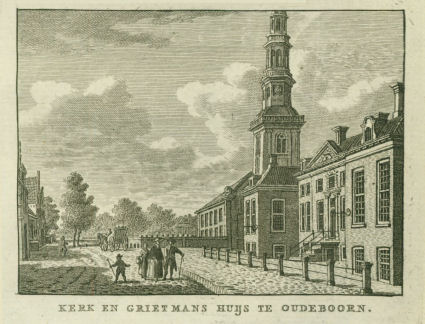
Drawing of Aldeboard (1808)

Church bell ringing in Aldeboarn, June 2022
