= Vegelinsoord =

Vegelinsoord Vegelinsoard
- Village
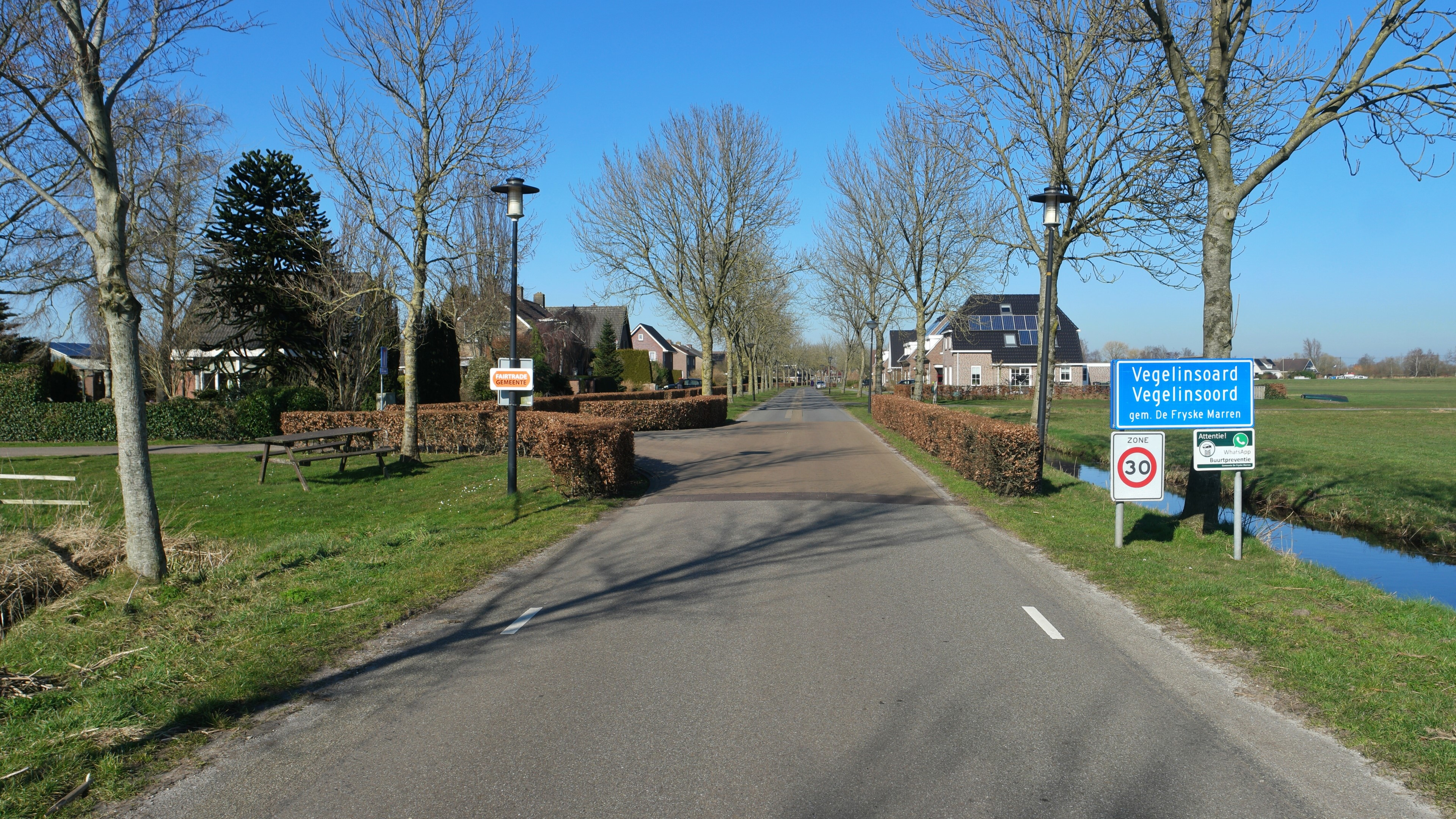
- Vegelinsoord, south village entrance

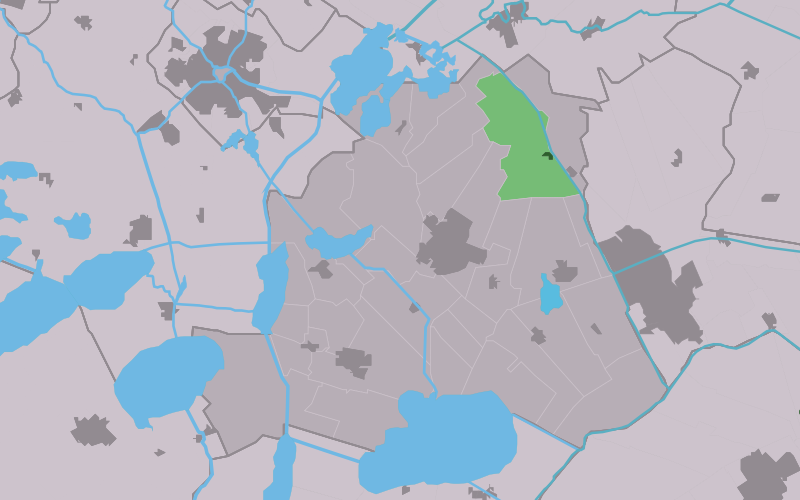
- Location in the former Skarsterlân municipality

- Location in the Netherlands Vegelinsoord (Netherlands)
- Country: Netherlands
- Province: Friesland
- Municipality: De Fryske Marren

Area
  - Total: 16.02 km^{2} (6.19 sq mi)
- Elevation: −0.6 m (−2.0 ft)

Population (2021)
  - Total: 390
  - Density: 24/km^{2} (63/sq mi)
- Time zone: UTC+1 (CET)
  - Summer (DST): UTC+2 (CEST)
- Postal code: 8467
- Dialing code: 0513

Vegelinsoord (West Frisian: Vegelinsoard) is a village in De Fryske Marren municipality in the province of Friesland, the Netherlands. It had a population of around 390 in 2017.

There is a windmill in the village, De Deels.

== History ==
The village was first mentioned in 1913 as Stobbegat. In 1958, it changed its name to Vegelinsoord after the Vegelin van Claerbergen family.

The polder mill De Deels or Grevensmolen is located near the village. The windmill dates from 1860 and has remained in service to drain excess water throughout its existence.

Before 2014, Vegelinsoord was part of the Skarsterlân municipality and before 1984 it was part of Haskerland.

== Gallery ==
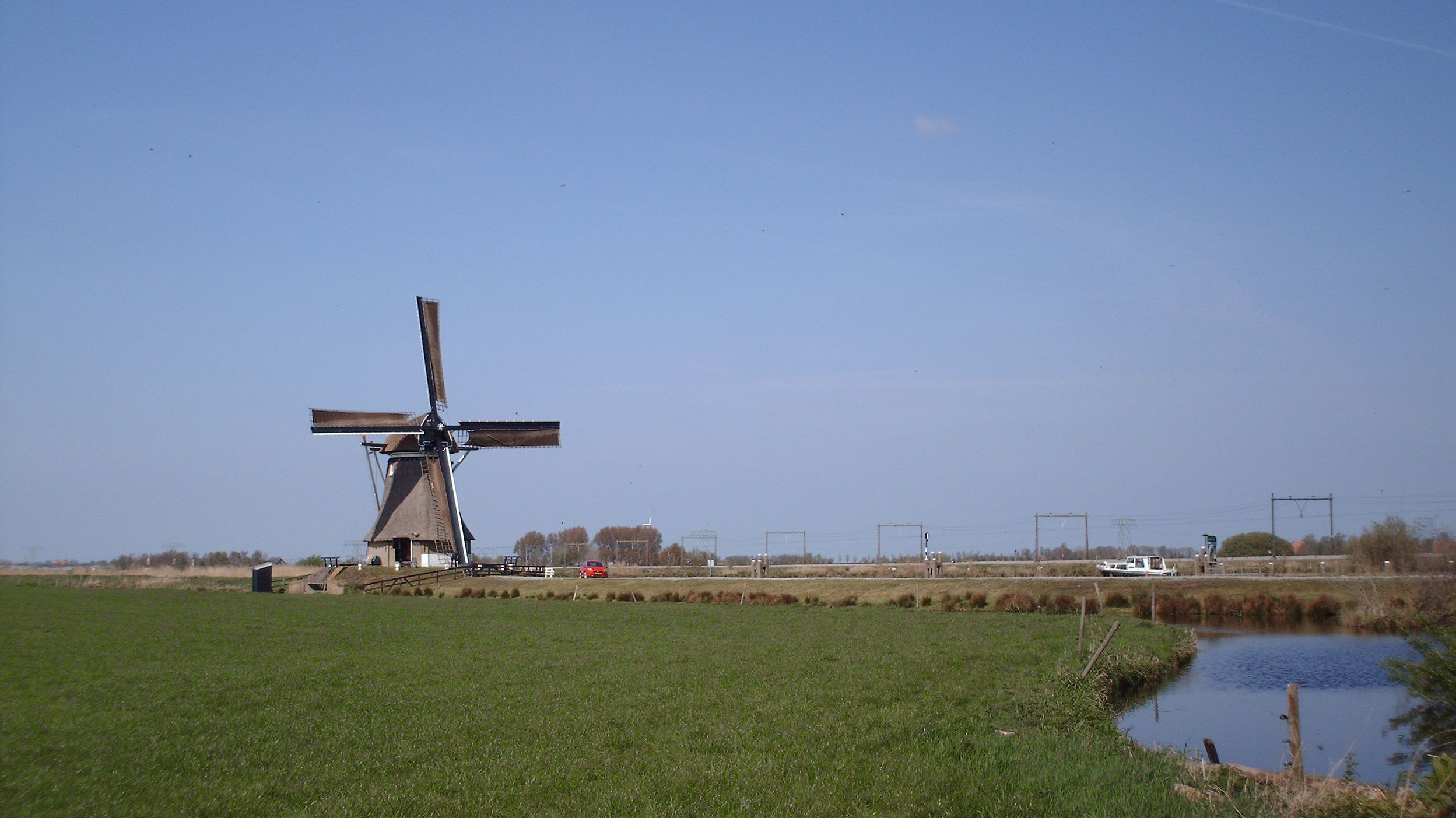
Grevensmolen Mill

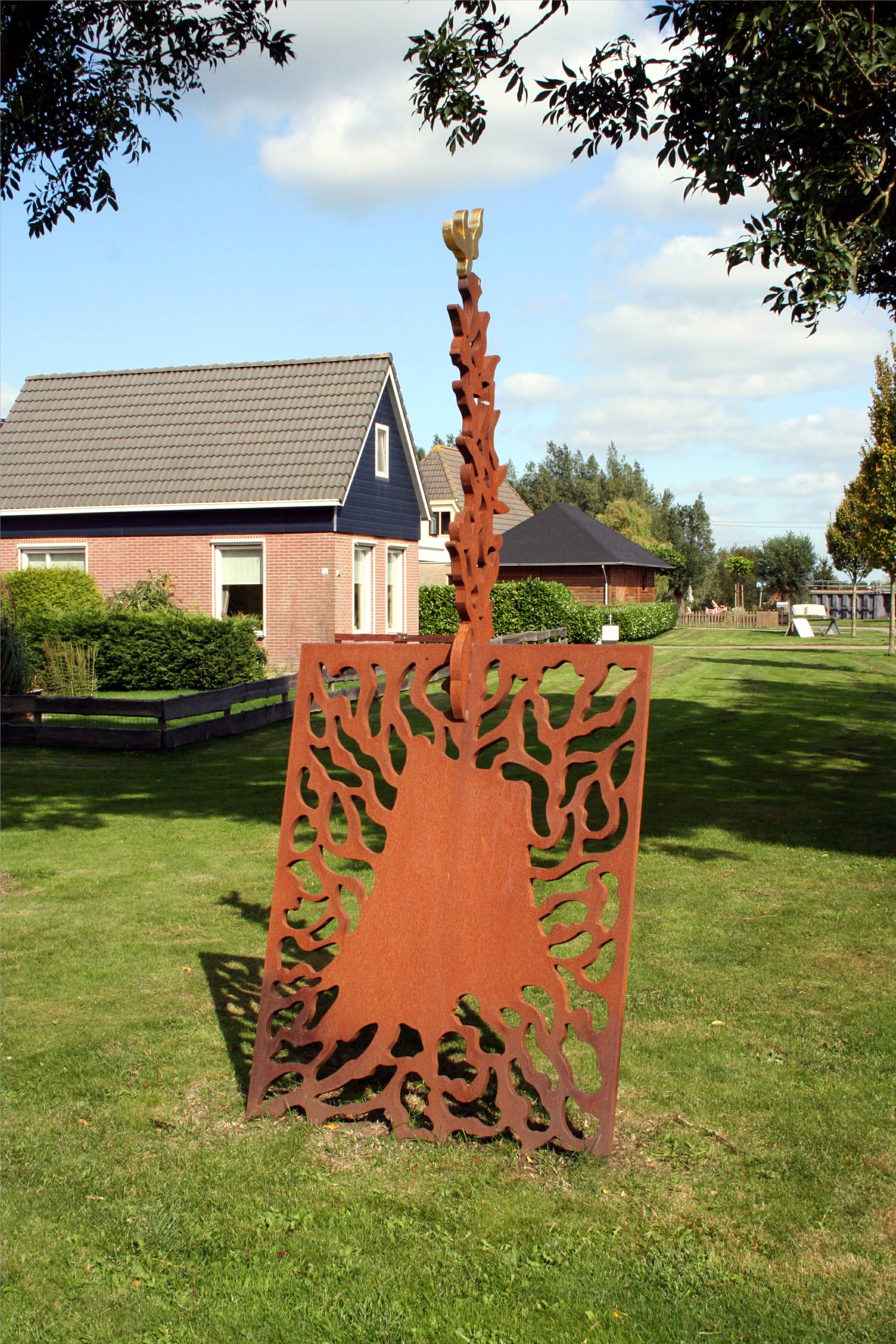
Statue Fean

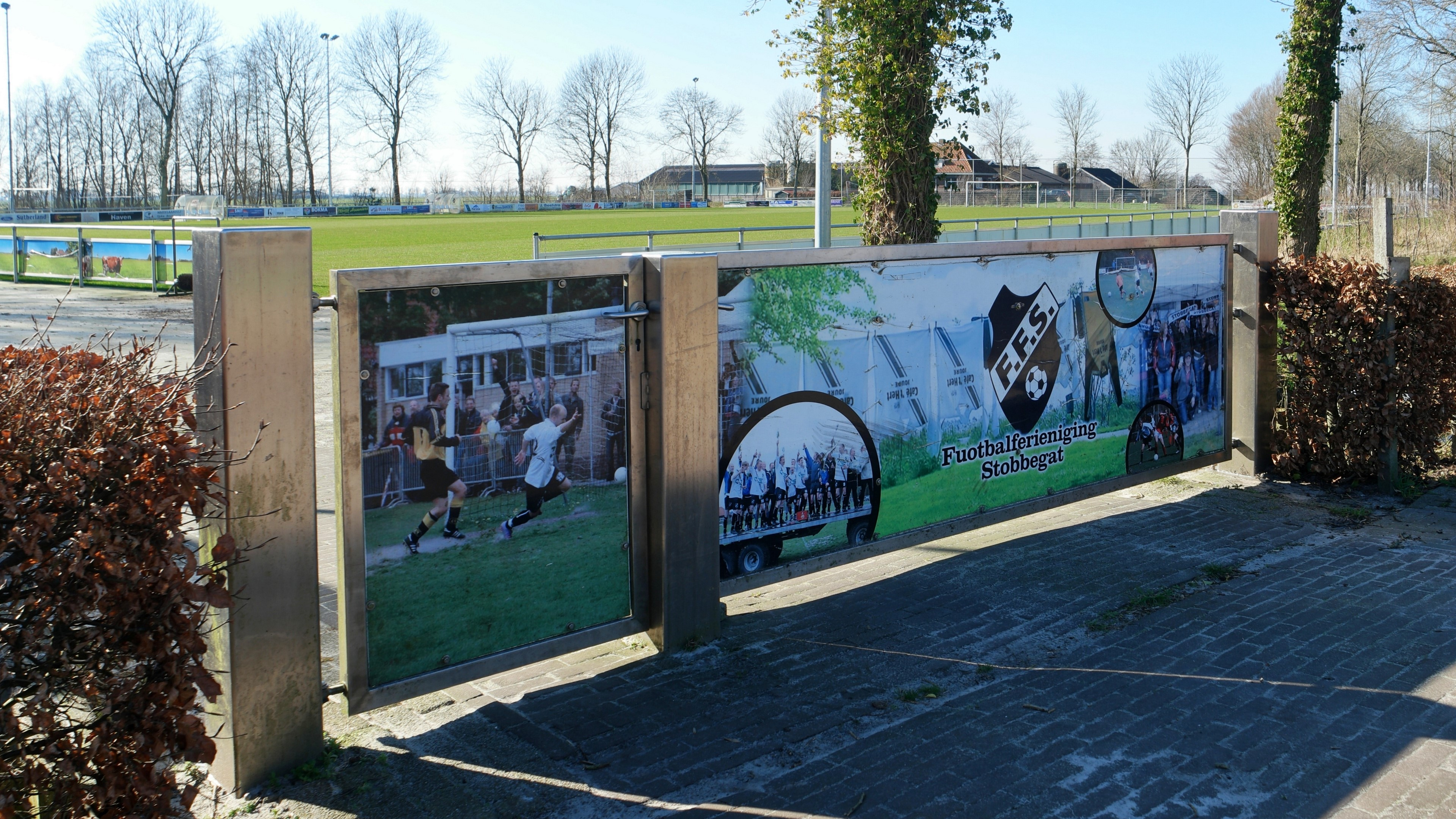
Football club Stobbegat
