= Akmarijp =

Akmarijp Eagmaryp
- Village
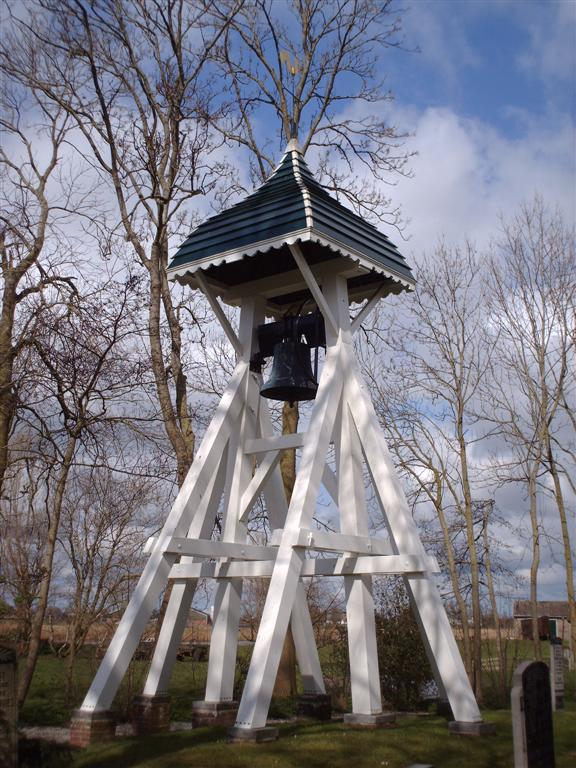
- The cemetery bell of Eagmaryp

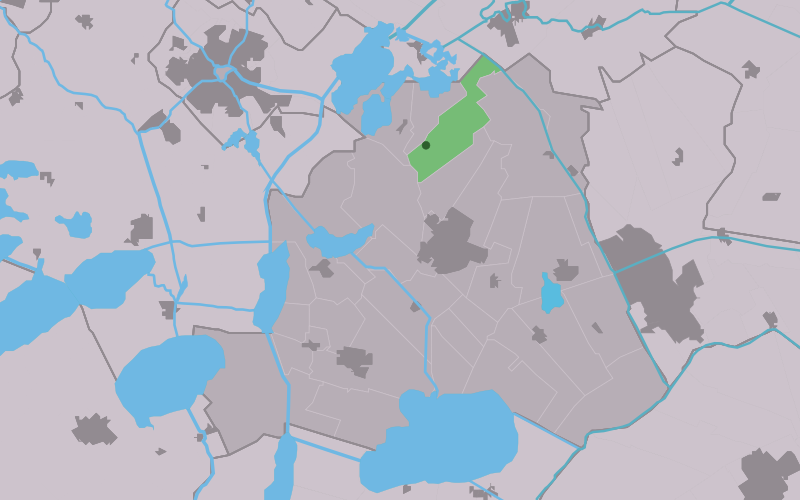
- Location in the former Skarsterlân municipality

- Location in the Netherlands Akmarijp (Netherlands)
- Country: Netherlands
- Province: Friesland
- Municipality: De Fryske Marren

Area
  - Total: 3.65 km^{2} (1.41 sq mi)
- Elevation: −0.1 m (−0.33 ft)

Population (2021)
  - Total: 110
  - Density: 30/km^{2} (78/sq mi)
- Time zone: UTC+1 (CET)
  - Summer (DST): UTC+2 (CEST)
- Postal code: 8541
- Dialing code: 0566

Akmarijp (West Frisian: Eagmaryp) is a village in the Dutch province of Friesland. It is in the municipality De Fryske Marren, about 5 km north of the town of Joure.

Akmarijp has about 110 inhabitants (2017).

== History ==
The village was first mentioned in 1315 as Ackrommariip, and means "on the edge of Akkrum. Akmarijp is a canal village which developed during the 11th century. The belfry dates from 1844 and is a replacement for a demolished church tower. The church was demolished in 1722. In 1840, Akmarijp was home to 99 people.

Before 2014, Akmarijp was part of the Skarsterlân municipality and before 1984 it was part of Utingeradeel.
