= De Deels, Vegelinsoord =

Smock mill in Friesland, Netherlands

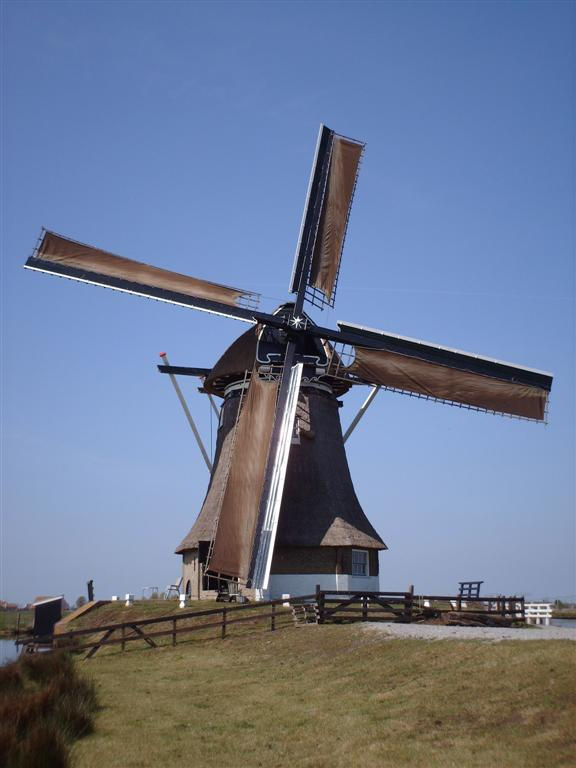
- De Deels, April 2007.

Origin
- Mill name: De Deels; Douwemûne; Grevensmolen
- Mill location: Derlswal 4, 8467 SL, Vegelinsoord
- Coordinates: 53°01′03″N 5°51′21″E
- Operator(s): Gemeente Skarlân
- Year built: 1859

Information
- Purpose: Drainage mill
- Type: Smock mill
- Storeys: Two storey smock
- Base storeys: One storey base
- Smock sides: Eight sides
- No. of sails: Four sails
- Type of sails: Common sails
- Windshaft: Cast iron
- Winding: Tailpole and winch
- Type of pump: Archimedes' screw

De Deels, Douwemûne, or Grevensmolen is a smock mill in Vegelinsoord, Friesland, Netherlands which was built in 1859 and has been restored to working order. It is listed as a Rijksmonument.

== History ==
De Deels was built in 1859 to drain the 3,660 hectares (9,000 acres) Haskerveenpolder. It is one of two mills built that year to drain the polder. A third was erected later. Construction cost ƒ11,382.06. Living accommodation was built into the mill from the outset. The mill was working until 1952. Both the gemeente and the province were in favour of its preservation, but an application to have the mill designated under an act which would have kept the mill in working order for use in wartime was rejected. The mill was transferred to the Gemeente Skarlân on 29 September 1959. The mill was restored in 1993. The thatch on the cap was renewed in 2006, and that on the smock in 2010. The wooden Archimedes' screw, dating from 1975, was replaced in 2010. The mill is listed as a Rijksmonument, №20846.

== Description ==
De Deels is what the Dutch describe as a Grondzeiler. It is a two-storey smock mill on a single storey base. There is no stage, the sails reaching almost to ground level. The mill is winded by tailpole and winch. The smock and cap are thatched. The sails are Common sails. They have a span of 22.40 metres (73 ft 6 in). The sails are carried on a cast iron windshaft, which was cast by L I van Enthuizen en Co, in 1860. The windshaft carries the brake wheel which has 65 cogs. This drives the wallower (33 cogs) at the top of the upright shaft. At the bottom of the upright shaft there are two crown wheels The upper crown wheel, which has 47 cogs drives an Archimedes' screw via a crown wheel. The lower crown wheel, which has 44 cogs is carried on the axle of an Archimedes' screw, which is used to drain the polder. The axle of the screw is 40 centimetres (1 ft 4 in) diameter and 4.80 metres (15 ft 9 in) long. The screw is 1.35 metres (4 ft 5 in) diameter. It is inclined at 20°. Each revolution of the screw lifts 740 litres (160 imp gal) of water.^{[Note 1]}

== Public access ==
De Deels is usually open on Saturdays, or by appointment.

== Notes ==
1. Dimensions given for the Archimedes' screw apply to the one fitted in 1975 and removed in 2010.
