= Terherne =

- Village
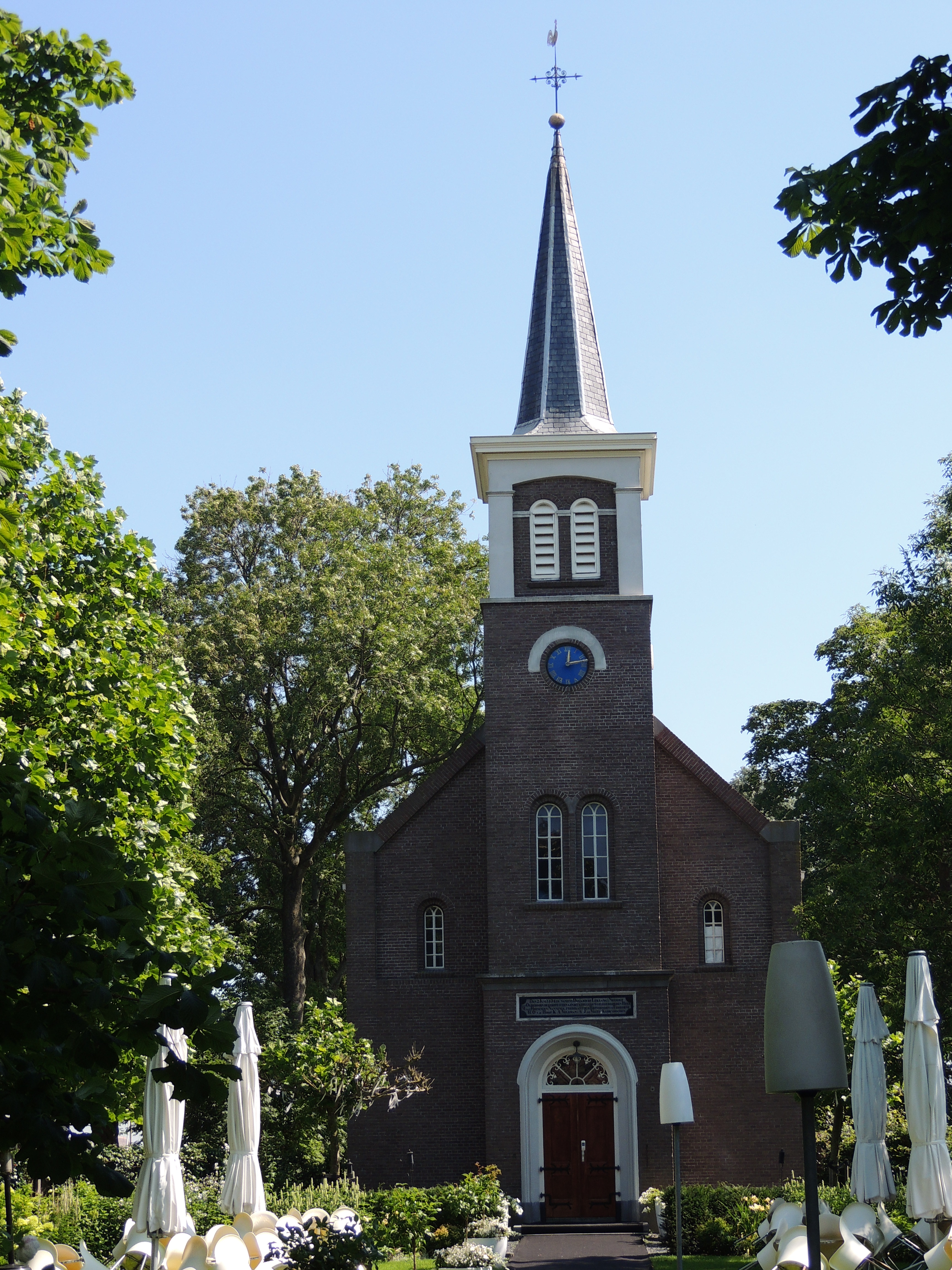
- Terherne church

- Flag Coat of arms

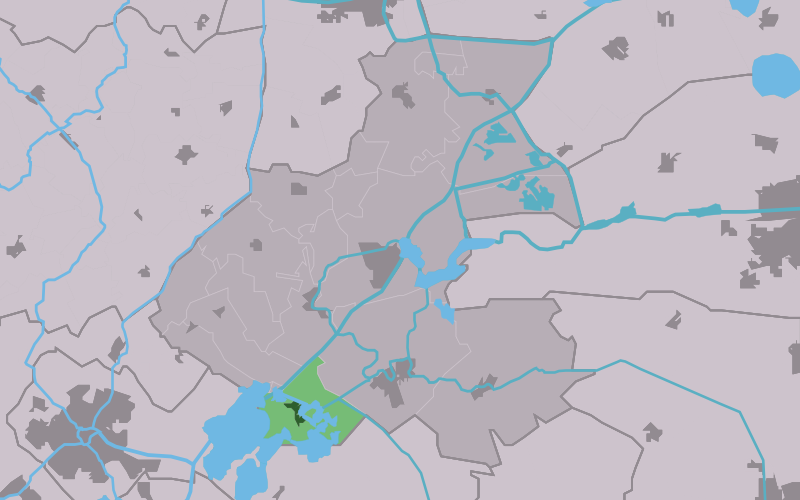
- Location in the former Boarnsterhim municipality

- Location in the Netherlands Terherne (Netherlands)
- Country: Netherlands
- Province: Friesland
- Municipality: De Fryske Marren

Area
  - Total: 9.15 km^{2} (3.53 sq mi)
- Elevation: 0.2 m (0.66 ft)

Population (2021)
  - Total: 760
  - Density: 83/km^{2} (220/sq mi)
- Time zone: UTC+1 (CET)
  - Summer (DST): UTC+2 (CEST)
- Postal code: 8493
- Dialing code: 0566

Terherne (Dutch: Terhorne) is a village in De Fryske Marren in the province of Friesland, the Netherlands. It had a population of around 780 in 2017.

== History ==
The village was first mentioned in 1491 as ter Herna, and means "near the corner". In 1840, it was home to 509 people. The Dutch Reformed Church dates from 1874. Terherne has become a recreational village with many holiday homes, and during the holidays the population can increase to around 6,000 people.

Before 2014, Terherne was part of the Boarnsterhim municipality and before 1984 it was part of Utingeradeel.

== Transportation ==
The nearest station is Akkrum railway station.

== Gallery ==
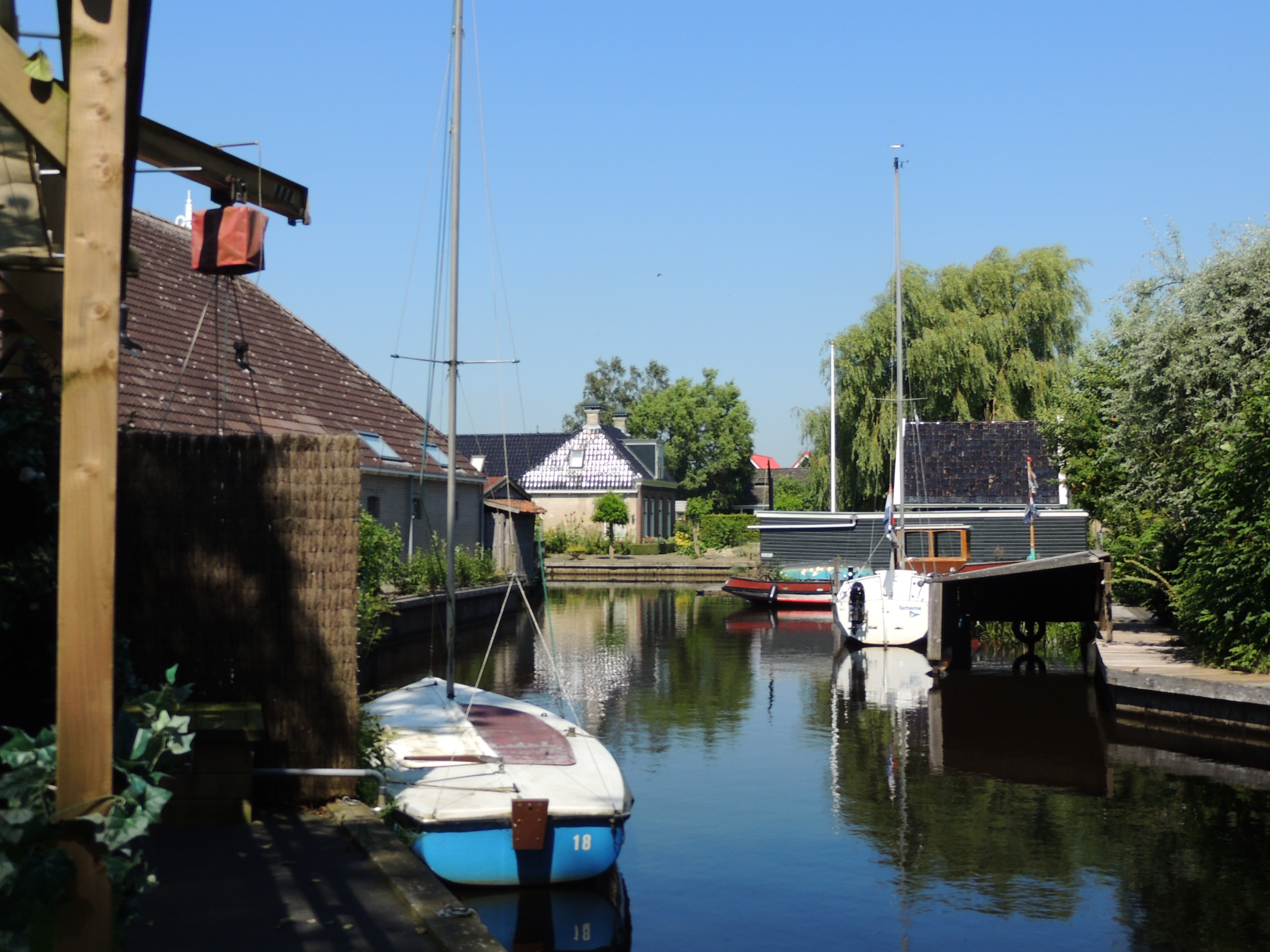
Canal in Terherne

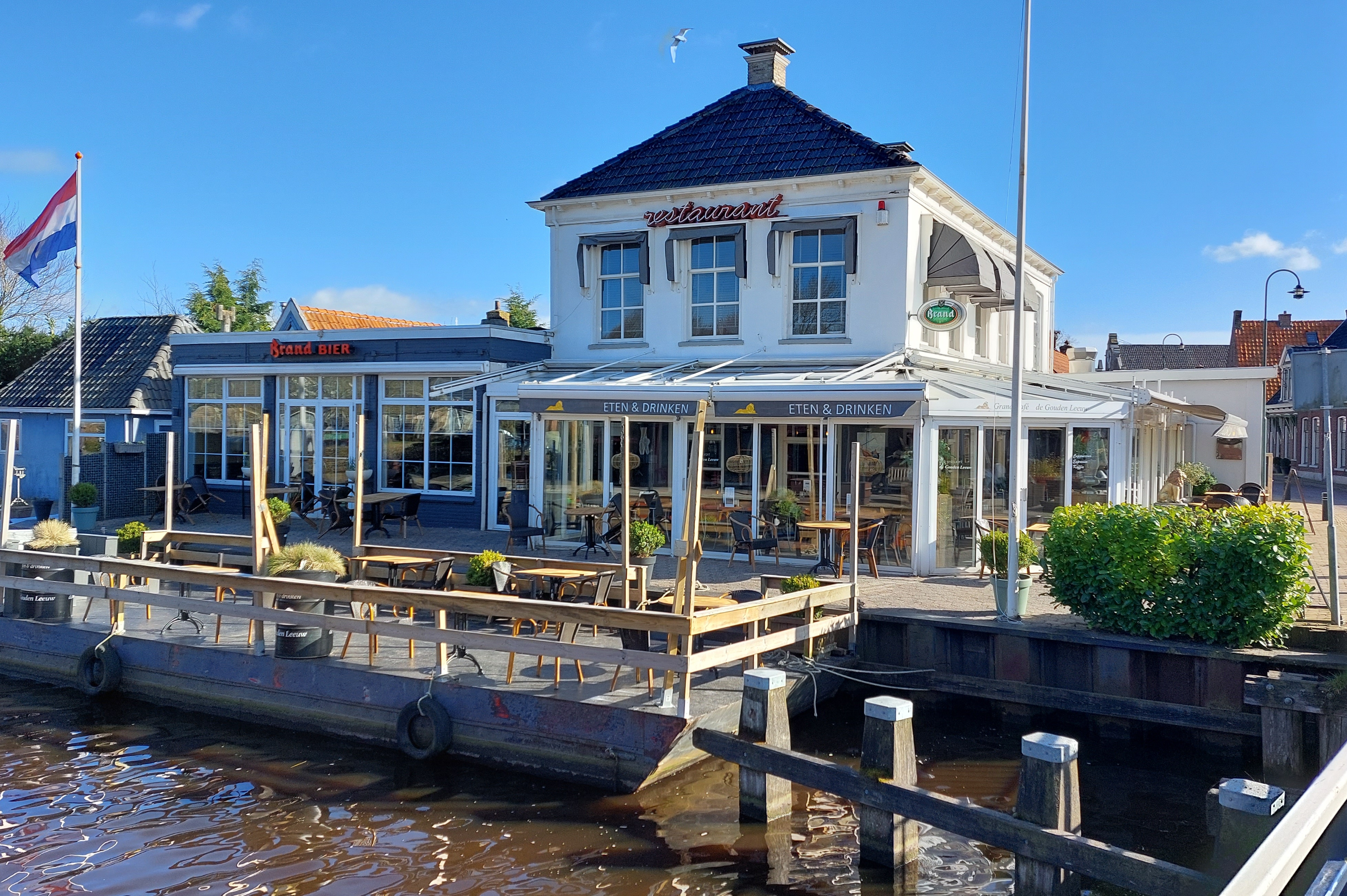
Restaurant De Gouden Liuw

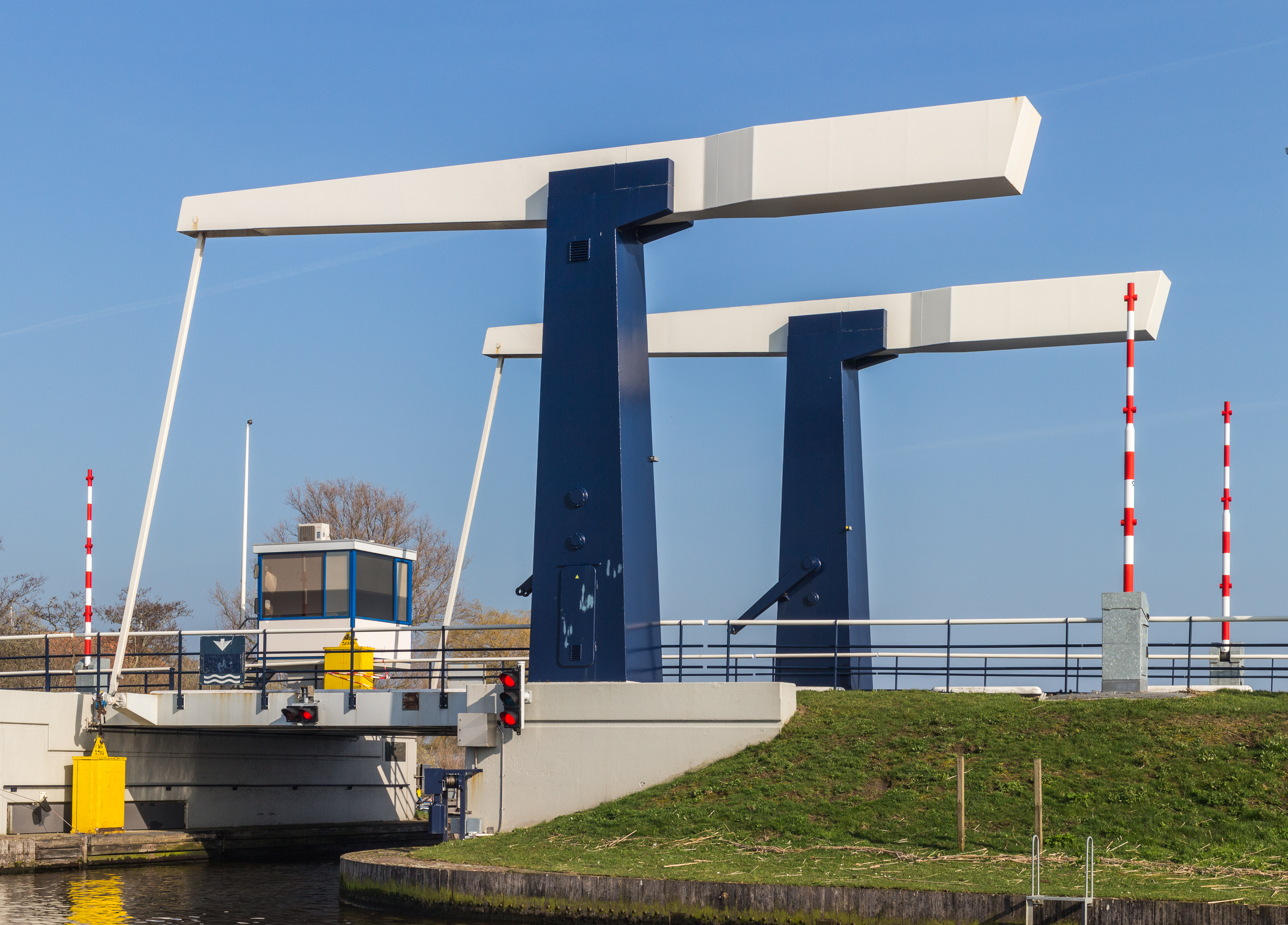
Bridge at Terherne

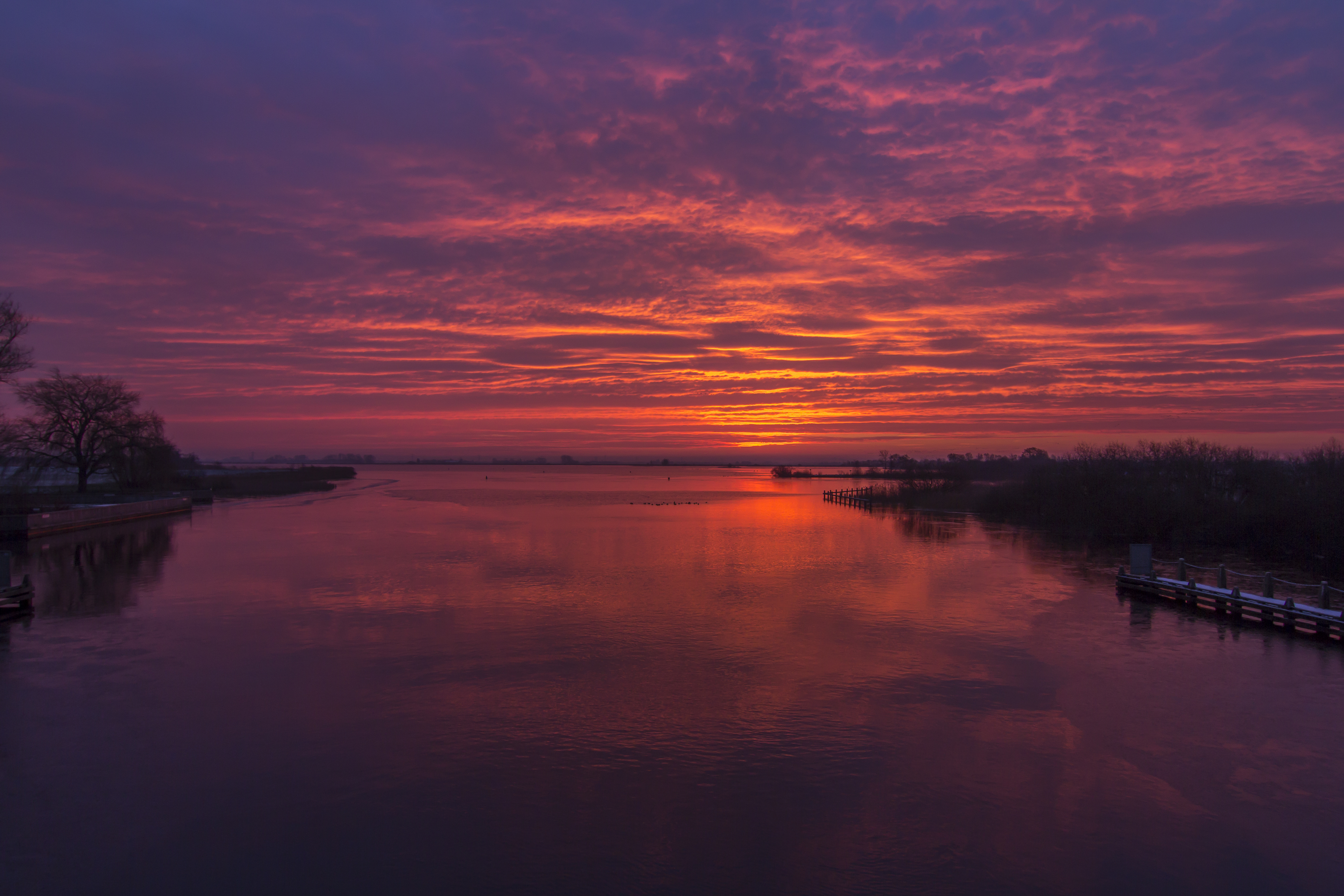
Sunset over the lake
