= Heerenveen =

Heerenveen It Hearrenfean (West Frisian)
- Town and municipality
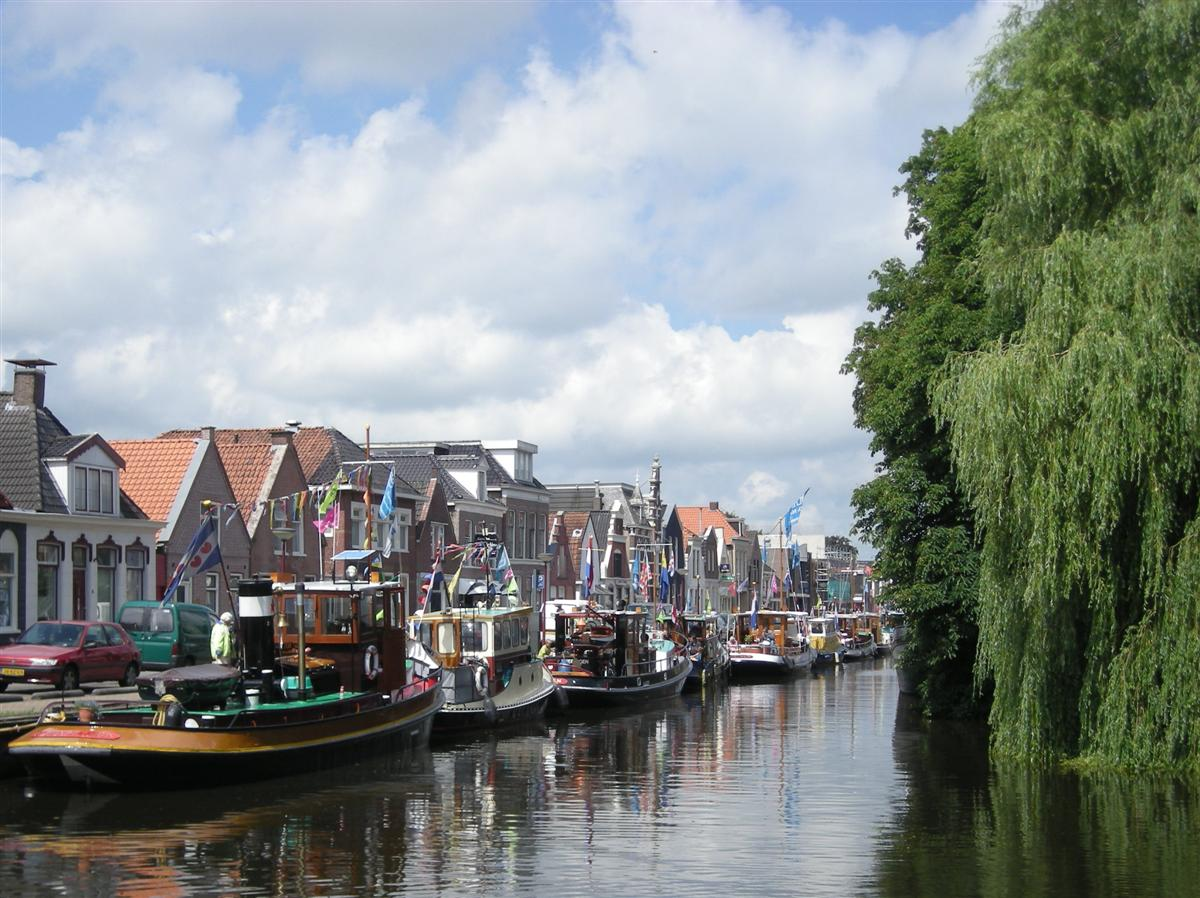
- Heeresloot

- Flag Seal

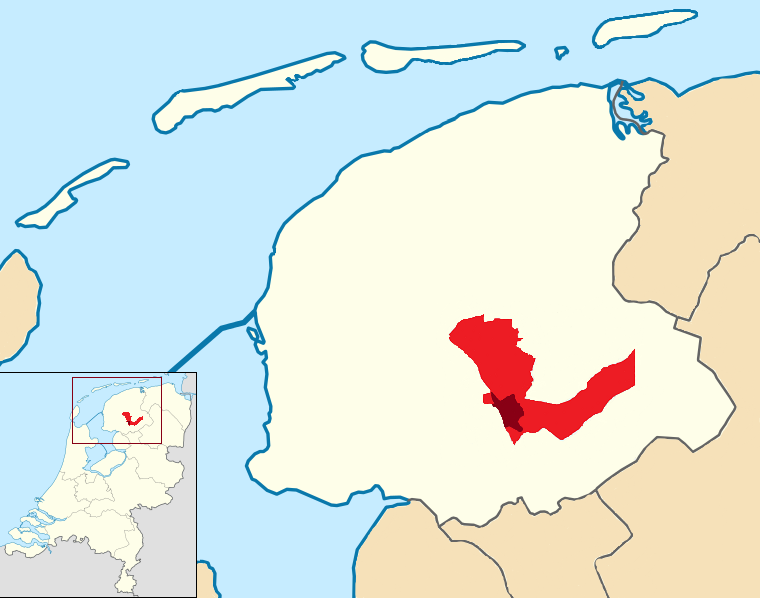
- Location of the municipality (red) and the city (dark red) in the province of Friesland in the Netherlands
- Coordinates: 52°58′N 5°55′E
- Country: Netherlands
- Province: Friesland

Government
  - Body: Municipal council
  - Mayor: Avine Fokkens-Kelder (VVD)

Area
  - Total: 198.17 km^{2} (76.51 sq mi)
  - Land: 190.09 km^{2} (73.39 sq mi)
  - Water: 8.08 km^{2} (3.12 sq mi)
- Elevation: 1 m (3.3 ft)

Population (January 2021)
  - Total: 50,650
  - Density: 266/km^{2} (690/sq mi)
- Demonym: Heerenvener
- Time zone: UTC+1 (CET)
  - Summer (DST): UTC+2 (CEST)
- Postcode: 8410–8459
- Area code: 0513, 0516
- Website: www.heerenveen.nl

Heerenveen (Dutch pronunciation: [ˌɦeːrə(ɱ)ˈveːn], West Frisian: It Hearrenfean [ət ˌjɛrn̩ˈfɪən], Stellingwerfs: et Vene) is a town and municipality in the province of Friesland (Fryslân), in the Northern Netherlands. In 2021, the town had a population of 29,790 (1 January) while the municipality in 2026 had a population of 51,955.

The town itself is located southeast of Sneek and southwest of Drachten. Heerenveen is the oldest peat canal village in the Netherlands. Heerenveen is the fourth-largest place in Friesland in terms of population, but is not one of the eleven Frisian cities.

The municipality was formed on 1 July 1934, from parts of former municipalities Aengwirden and Schoterland, and a portion of the municipality of Haskerland. Boarnsterhim also merged into Heerenveen.

== History ==
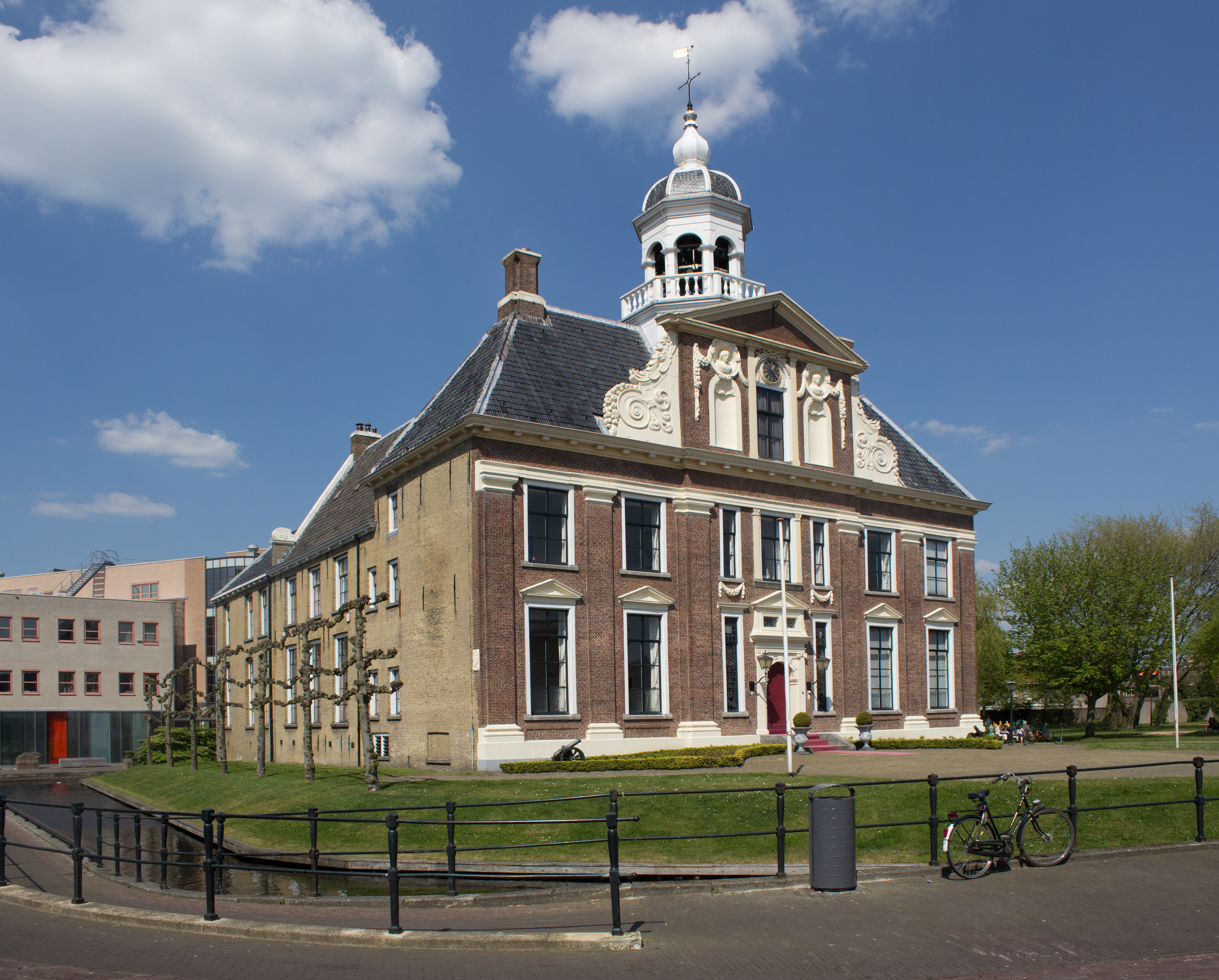
Crackstate

The town was established in 1551 by three lords as a location to dig peat which was used for fuel, hence the name (heer is "lord", veen is "peat"). Heerenveen was not one of the traditional eleven cities in Friesland (Fryslân) as it did not have so-called city rights. However, it is now one of the larger municipalities of the province.

The windmill Welgelegen or Tjepkema's Molen is the only survivor of seventeen which have stood in Heerenveen.

In the 19th century, Heerenveen developed because, besides its wealthy citizens, a large middle class also developed. And with the nearby Oranjewoud, the town has since been known as "Het Friese Haagje" (The Frisian Hague). Heerenveen municipality was created in 1934.

For a long time, Heerenveen was characterized by linear development. The total north-south length was five kilometers, while the width between the railway line and the highway was no more than one kilometer. In the 1970s, construction began of residential areas west of the railway line, extending to the Engelenvaart canal, which forms the municipal boundary. After this area was fully developed, expansion began on the east side in the 21st century.

Heerenveen is now approximately three kilometers wide and oval-shaped. This has resulted in Heerenveen merging with its neighboring villages (Oudeschoot, Nieuweschoot, Oranjewoud, Nijehaske, De Knipe, and Terband).

== Population centers ==
Population as of 1 January 2018:

Heerenveen (32,900), Akkrum (3406), Aldeboarn (1479), Bontebok (445), De Knipe (1470), Gersloot (280, together with Gersloot-Polder), Hoornsterzwaag (815), Jubbega (3510), Katlijk (630), Luinjeberd (450), Mildam (740), Nes (1104), Nieuwebrug (210), Nieuwehorne (1500), Nieuweschoot (180), Oranjewoud (1610), Oudehorne (840), Oudeschoot (1480), Terband (265) and Tjalleberd (800).

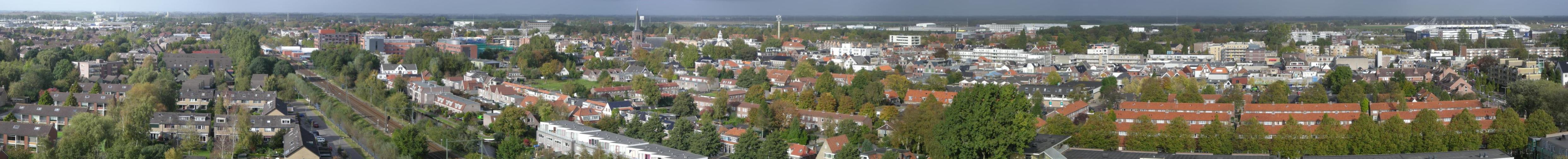
Panorama of Heerenveen

=== Hamlets ===
The hamlets are: Anneburen, Birstum, Brongergea, Easterboarn, Jinshuzen, Meskenwier, Oude Schouw (partially), Pean, Poppenhúzen, Schurega, Soarremoarre, Spitsendijk, Sythuzen, Warniahúzen en Welgelegen (partially).

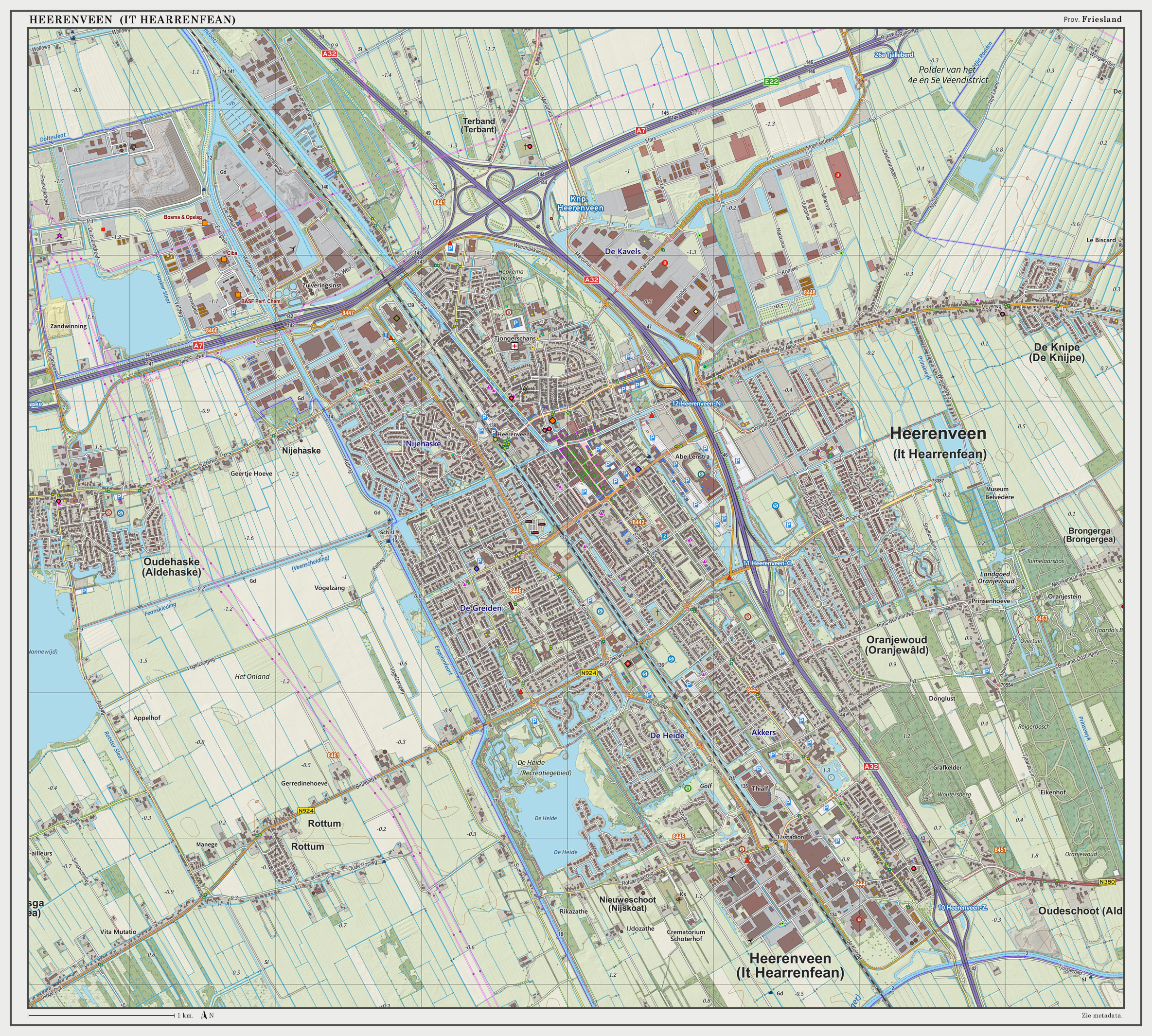
Map of the city of Heerenveen (2014)

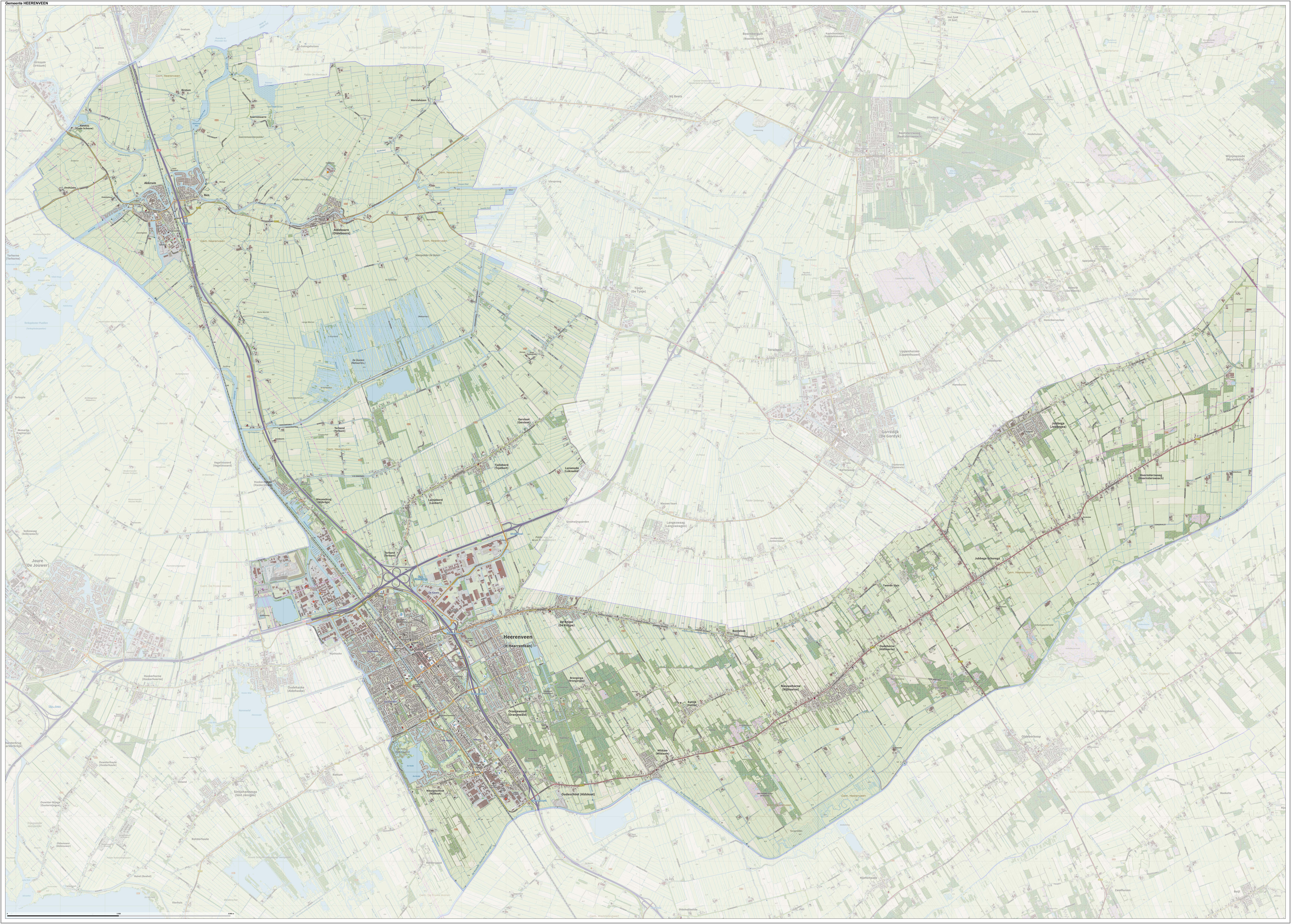
Map of the municipality of Heerenveen

== Museums ==
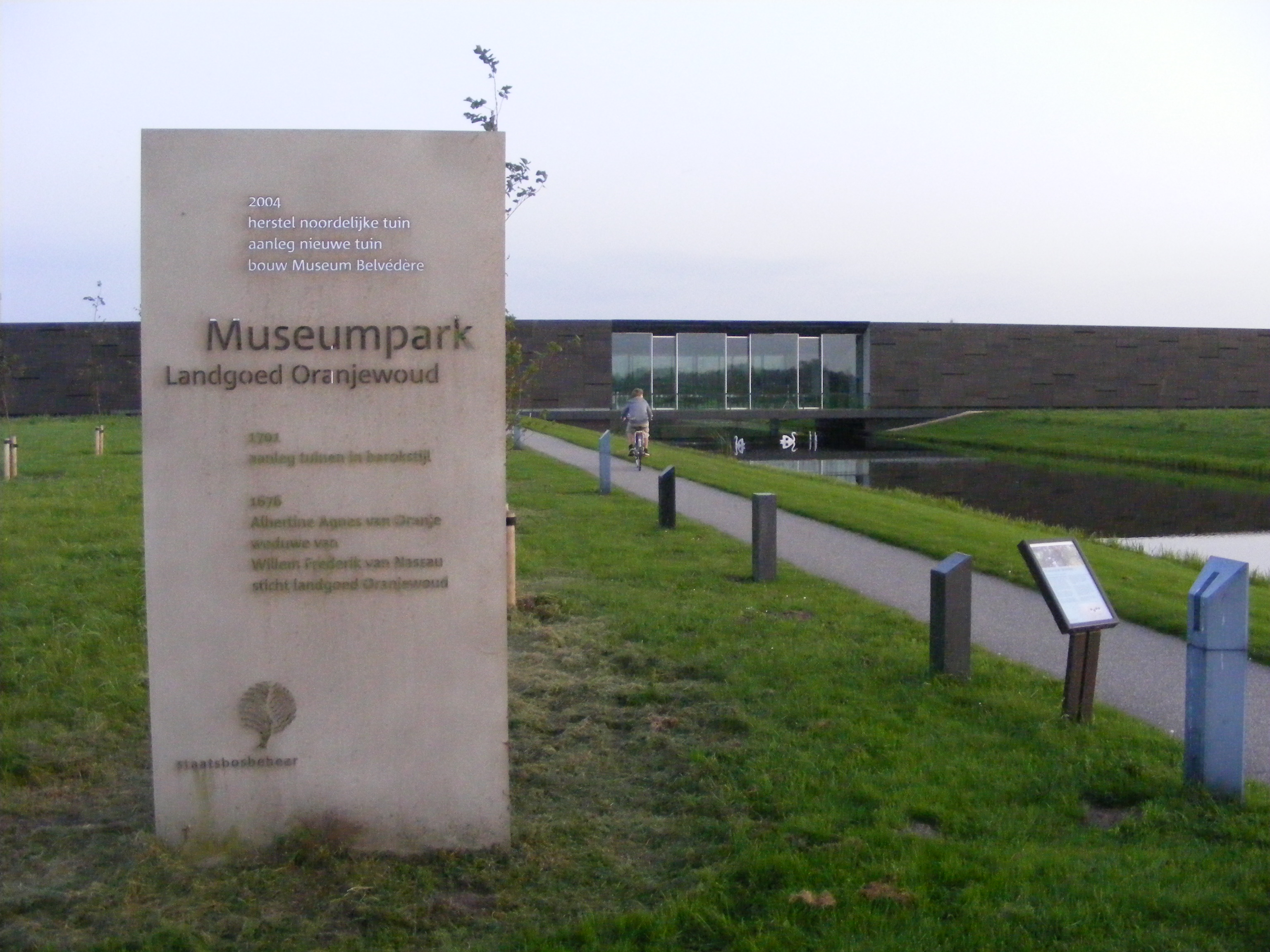
- Museum Belvédère
  Museum Belvédère, modern art and contemporary art
- Museum Heerenveen, local history and culture

== Local government ==
The Heerenveen municipal council consists of 31 seats, which at the 2026 municipal elections divided as follows:

- Heerenveen Lokaal – 6 seats
- Green Left / Labour Party – 5 seats
- CDA – 4 seats
- D66 – 3 seats
- Frisian National Party – 3 seats
- Forum for Democracy – 3 seats
- VVD – 3 seats
- Frisse Wind – 2 seats
- ChristianUnion – 1 seat
- Socialist Party – 1 seat

== Sports ==
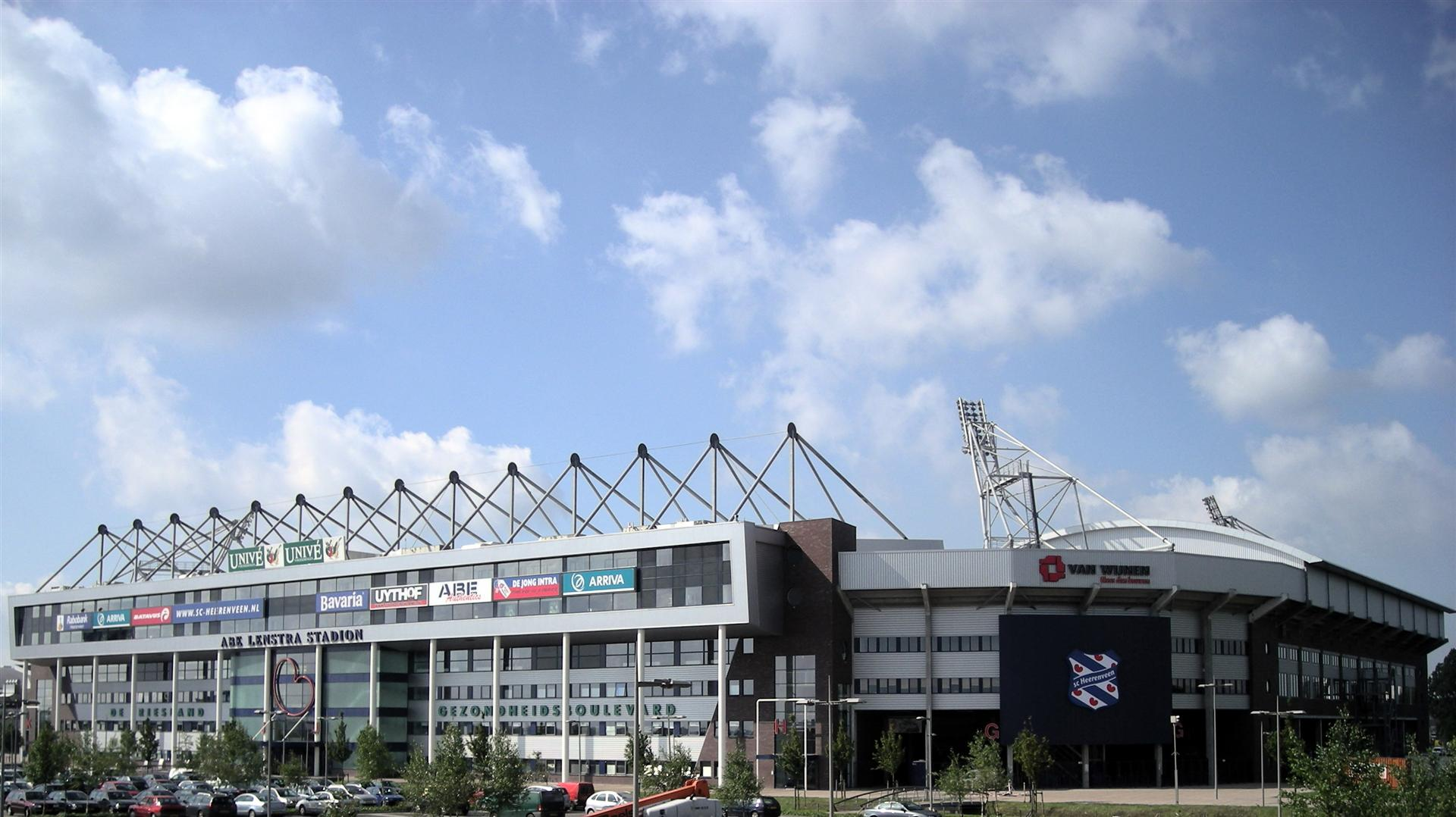
Abe Lenstra Stadium

Heerenveen is notable for its world class sports facilities. These include the Abe Lenstra football stadium and the Thialf speed skating arena which was one of the first indoor 400m ice rinks in the world, and where international events draw large crowds. Thialf is set to host long track speed skating for the 2030 Winter Olympics, which is being held in the French Alps. Thialf is also home to the city's ice hockey team, the Heerenveen Flyers. In 2006, the "Sportstad" (Sport City) project was completed, which included a gymnastics hall, swimming pool and an extension to the football stadium, all clustered together. The Abe Lenstra stadium is unusual because its capacity is larger than the number of inhabitants of the town. One of the few football venues to share this distinction is Stade Félix Bollaert in Lens, France.

The town's football team, SC Heerenveen, plays in the first-tier Eredivisie, topped by the team's biggest achievement when they qualified for the UEFA Champions League in 2000.

== Transport ==
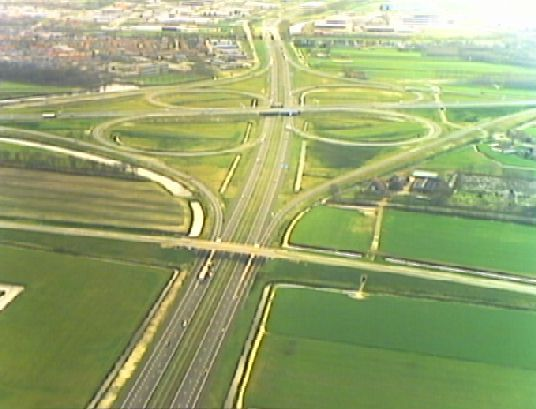
Knooppunt Heerenveen from the air

Heerenveen has its own named cloverleaf interchange (knooppunt) of the A7 (Zaandam-Bad Nieuweschans) and A32 (Meppel-Leeuwarden) highways.

Heerenveen station is located on the Leeuwarden–Zwolle railway line (Staatslijn A) and is part of the main rail network. The town in the past also had a second station, Heerenveen IJsstadion station which closed in 2015.

Heeresloot, New Heerenveen Canal, Engelenvaart (pleasure craft only).

== Notable residents ==
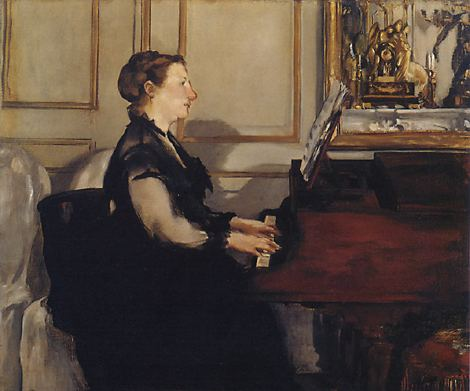
Mme Manet at the Piano, 1867–1868, Musée d'Orsay, Paris

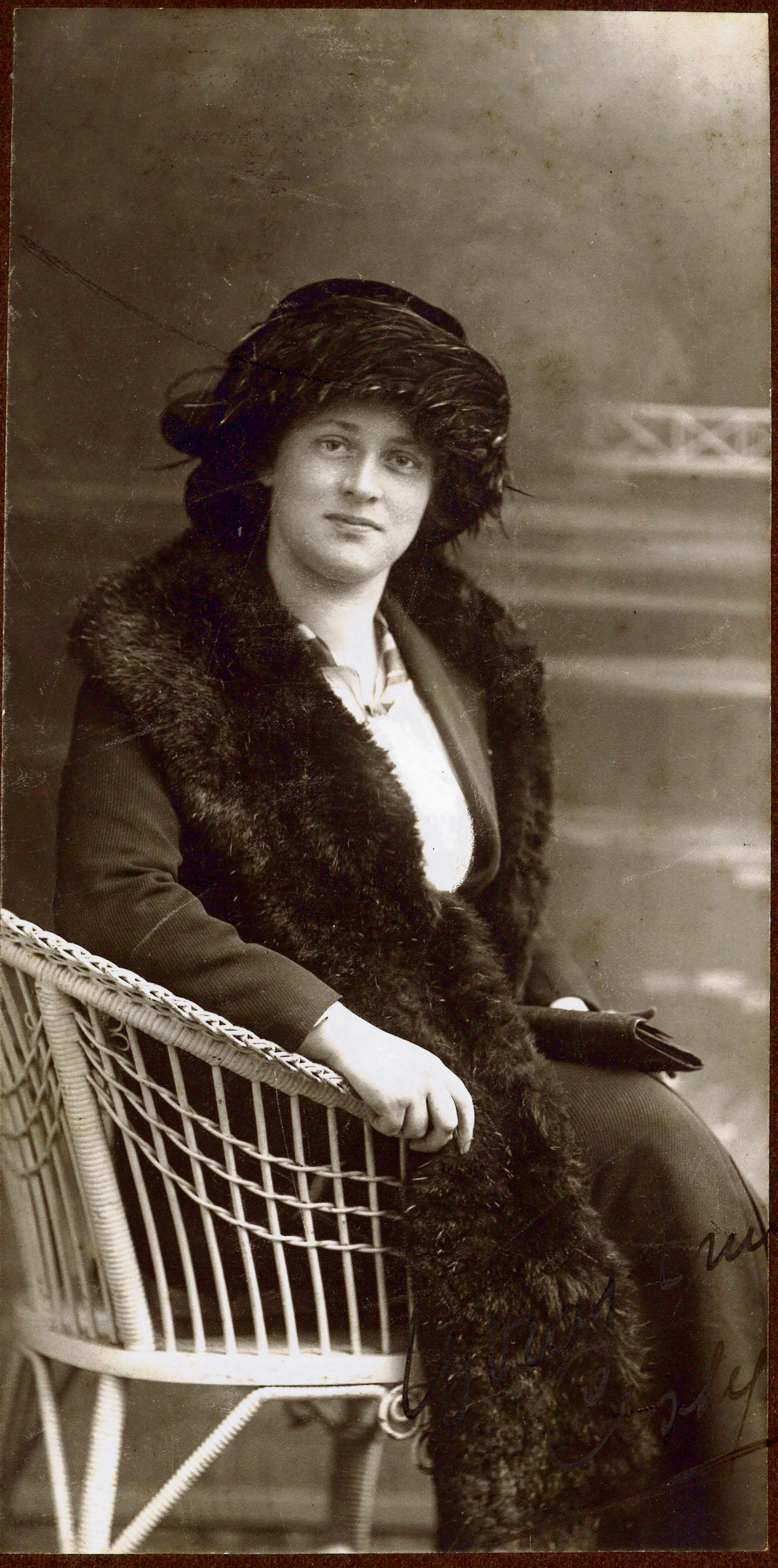
Cissy van Marxveldt, ca.1915

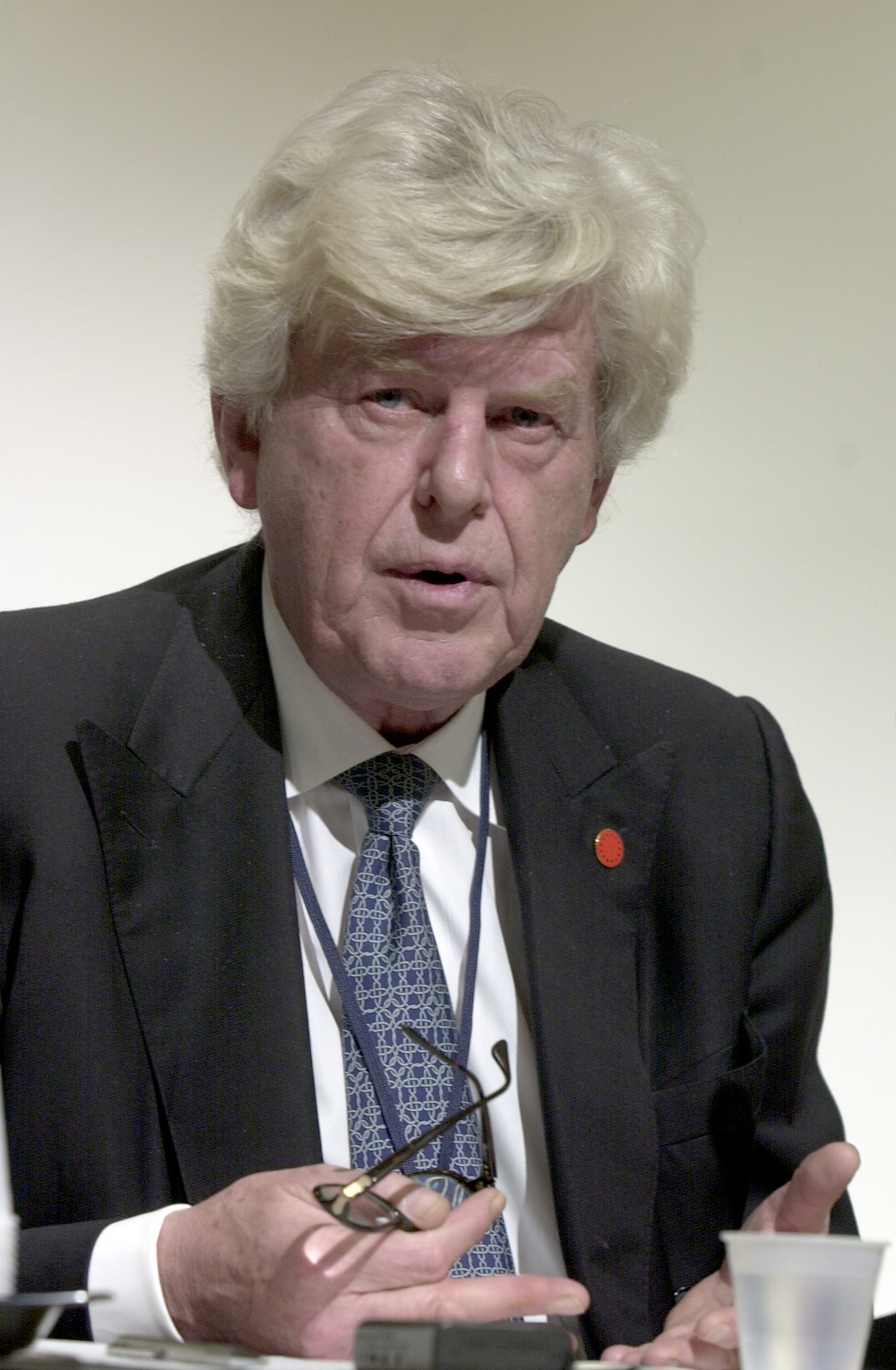
Wim Duisenberg, 2001

- Wilhelm Heinrich, Duke of Saxe-Eisenach (1691 in Oranjewoud – 1741) a Duke of Saxe-Eisenach
- Hendrik Pasma (1813–1890), Mennonite pastor, writer, politician and farmer
- Suzanne Manet (born 'Leenhoff', 1829–1906), pianist and opera singer, wife of Édouard Manet
- Geerhardus Vos (1862–1949), a Dutch-American Calvinist theologian of the Princeton Theology
- Cissy van Marxveldt (1889 in Oranjewoud – 1948) a writer of children's books
- Albert Gillis von Baumhauer (1891–1939) an aviation pioneer, designed the first Dutch helicopter
- Eelco van Kleffens (1894–1983) a Dutch politician and diplomat
- Herman Zanstra (1894 in Schoterland – 1972) a Frisian/Dutch astronomer
- Fedde Schurer (1898–1968), journalist, poet and politician; poet in the West Frisian language
- Adrianus van Kleffens (1899–1973) a judge at the European Court of Justice 1952/1958
- Klaas Runia (1926 in Oudeschoot – 2006) a theologian, churchman and journalist
- Wim Duisenberg (1935–2005), politician and President of the European Central Bank 1998/2003
- T. S. van Albada (born 1936 in Akkrum) an astronomer and academic
- Gretta Duisenberg (born 1942) a Dutch pro-Palestinian political activist
- Jacob de Haan (born 1959), a contemporary composer known for wind music
- Tineke Postma (born 1978), a saxophonist
- Jan Huitema (born 1984), politician and Member of the European Parliament (MEP)

=== Sport ===
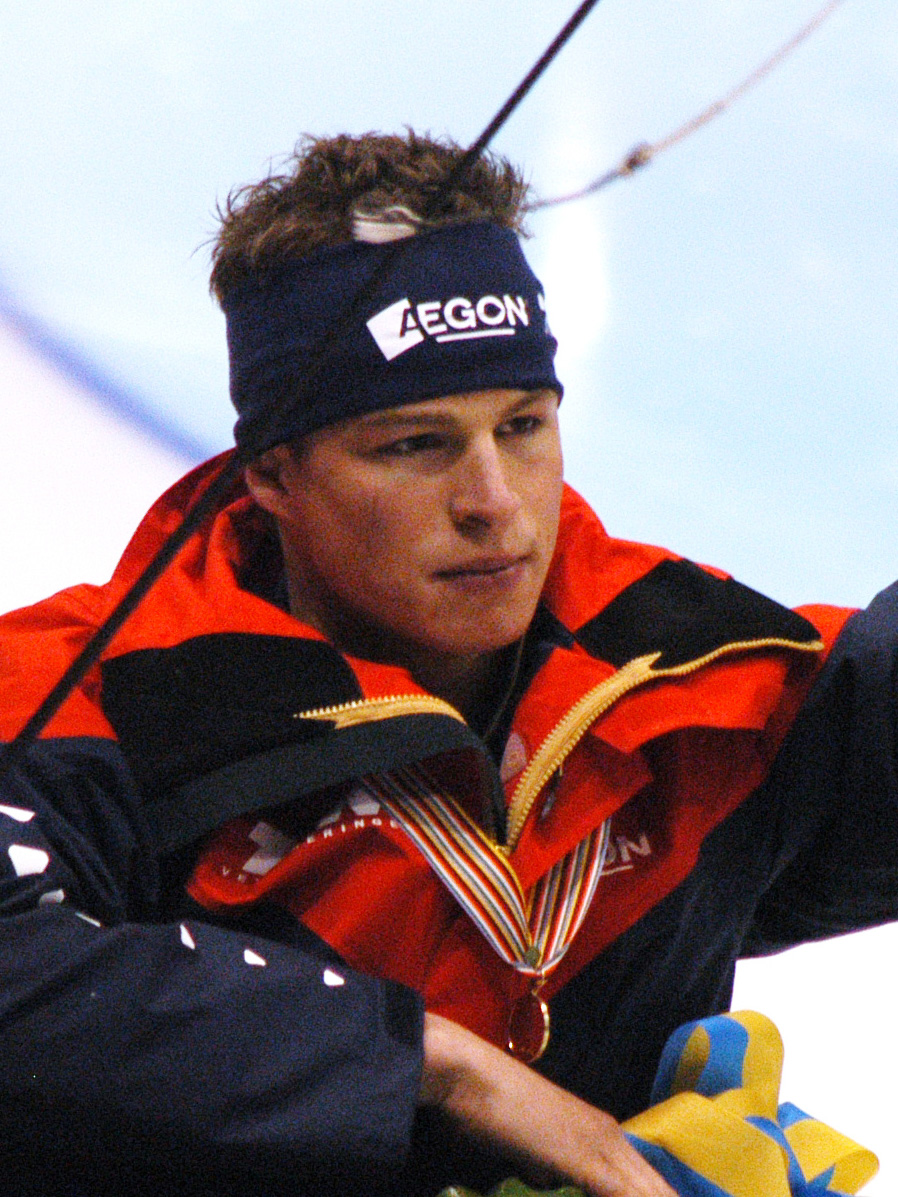
Sven Kramer, 2009

- Abe Lenstra (1920–1985), a football player with 730 club caps
- Foppe de Haan (born 1943), football coach and politician
- Margriet Zegers (born 1954), a retired Dutch field hockey defender, team gold medallist at the 1984 Summer Olympics
- Franke Sloothaak (born 1958) a German show jumping Olympic champion
- Nico-Jan Hoogma (born 1968) a former football defender with 517 club caps
- Falko Zandstra (born 1971), a former Dutch speed skater, silver medallist at the 1992 Winter Olympics and bronze medallist the 1994 Winter Olympics
- Carien Kleibeuker (born 1978) a Dutch long-distance speed skater, bronze medallist at the 2014 Winter Olympics
- Epke Zonderland (born 1986), a gymnast and gold medallist at the 2012 Summer Olympics
- Sven Kramer (born 1986), long track speed skater, three-time Olympic champion in the 5000 meters
- Jesper Hospes (born 1988), speed skater, three-time champion at the NK short-track competition
- Vladislav Bykanov (born 1989) an Israeli Olympic short track speed skater, lives in Heerenveen
- Sanne Wevers (born 1991), an artistic gymnast, gold medallist at the 2016 Summer Olympics
- Antoinette de Jong (born 1995) a Dutch speed skater, bronze medallist at the 2018 Winter Olympics
- Lisa Top (born 1996), an artistic gymnast
- Aafke Soet (born 1997), former short track speed skater, now cyclist
- Yasser Seirawan (born 1960), American/Syrian chess grandmaster and champion known for his books and commentary on chess games,
- Andries Noppert (born 1994), Dutch National Team Goalkeeper World Cup 2022.
- Anna-Maja Kazarian (born 7 January 2000), a chess player who holds the titles of FIDE Master (FM) and Woman International Master.

== Twin cities ==
Heerenveen's longstanding connection with Rishon LeZion, Israel ended in 2016 after the supporting organizations shut down in both countries.
