= Terband =

Terband Terbant
- Village
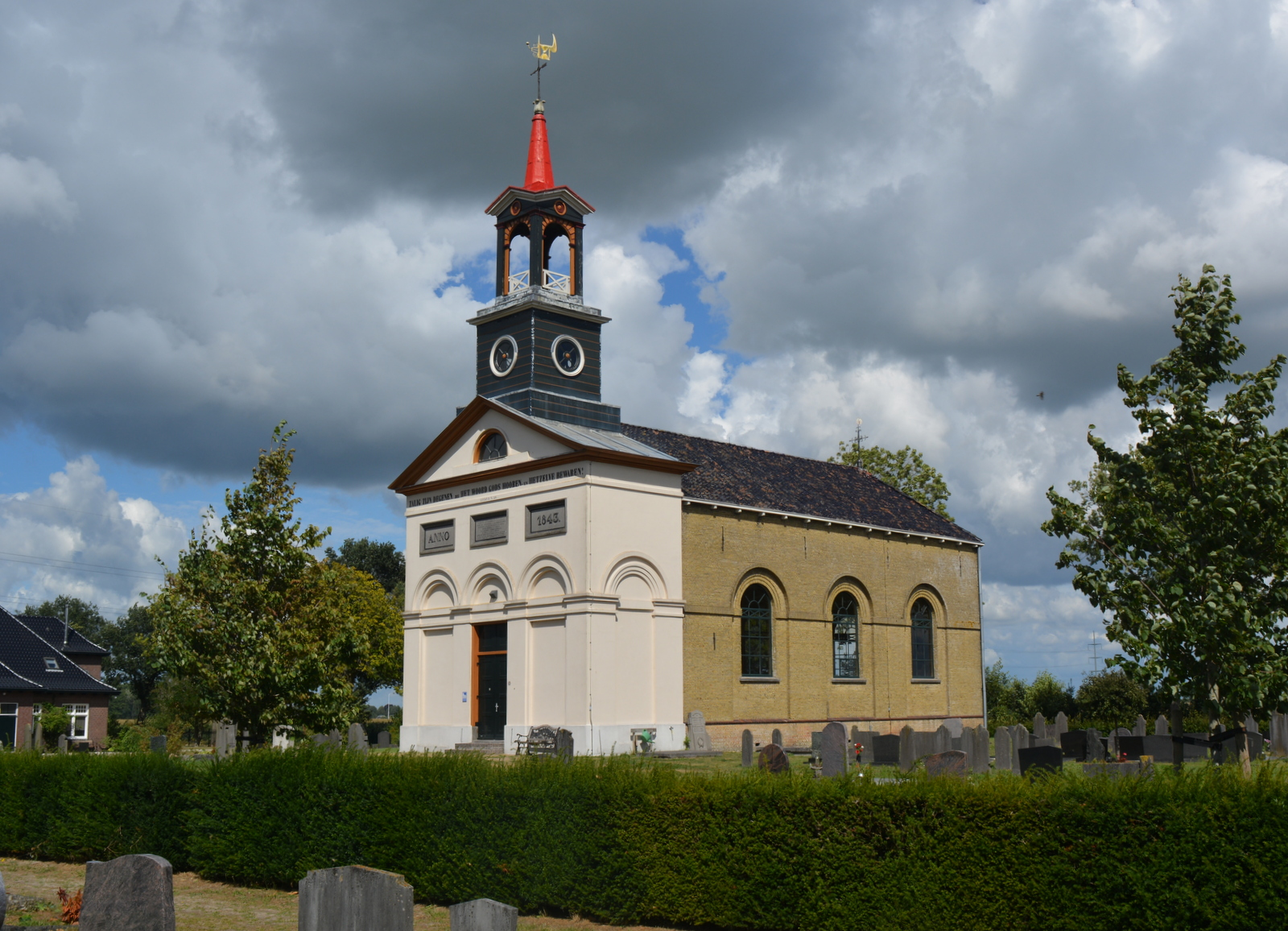
- The Terbantster Tsjerke in Terband

- Coat of arms

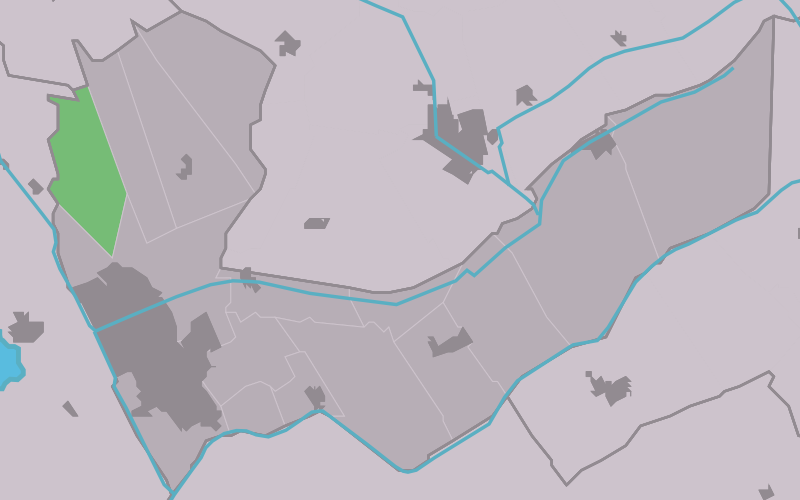
- Location in the Heerenveen municipality

- Location in the Netherlands Terband (Netherlands)
- Country: Netherlands
- Province: Friesland
- Municipality: Heerenveen

Area
  - Total: 7.31 km^{2} (2.82 sq mi)
- Elevation: −0.8 m (−2.6 ft)

Population (2021)
  - Total: 260
  - Density: 36/km^{2} (92/sq mi)
- Time zone: UTC+1 (CET)
  - Summer (DST): UTC+2 (CEST)
- Postal code: 8449
- Dialing code: 0513

Terband (West Frisian: Terbant) is a village in Heerenveen in the province of Friesland, the Netherlands. It had a population of around 270 in January 2017.

== History ==
The village was first mentioned in 1315 as Bant, and means "near the region". In 1315, a chapel was built in the village. In 1840, it was home to 228 people. In 1843, a Dutch Reformed church was built.

Before 1934, Terband was part of the Aengwirden municipality. Between 1954 and 1959, part of the village of annexed by Heerenveen, and demolished to create the interchange between the A7 and A32 motorways.
