= Luinjeberd =

Luinjeberd Lúnbert
- Village
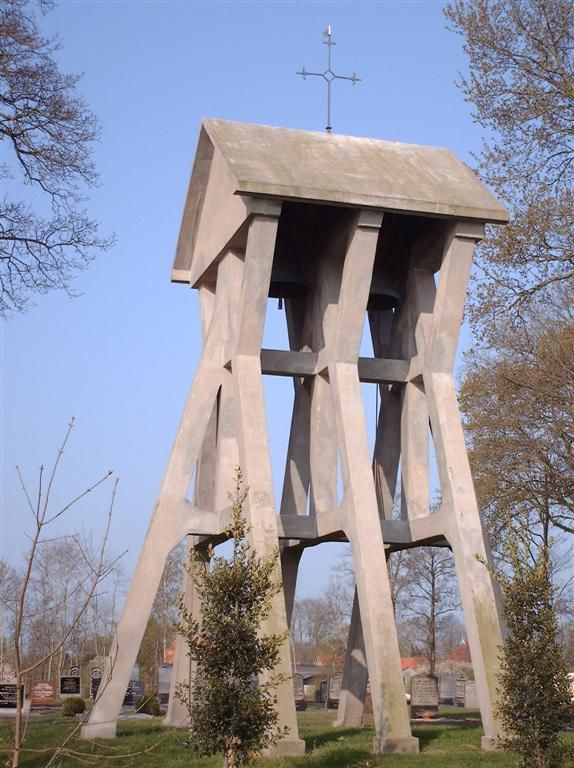
- Luinjeberd bell tower

- Coat of arms

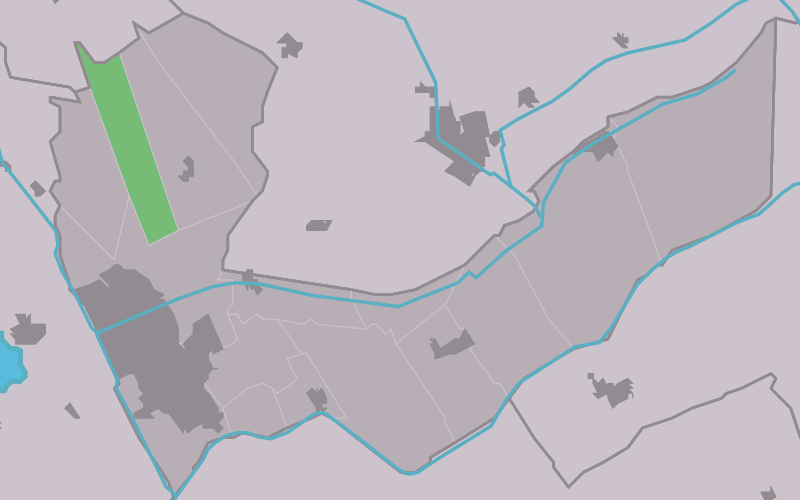
- Location in the Heerenveen municipality

- Location in the Netherlands Luinjeberd (Netherlands)
- Country: Netherlands
- Province: Friesland
- Municipality: Heerenveen

Area
  - Total: 6.45 km^{2} (2.49 sq mi)
- Elevation: −0.5 m (−1.6 ft)

Population (2021)
  - Total: 425
  - Density: 65.9/km^{2} (171/sq mi)
- Time zone: UTC+1 (CET)
  - Summer (DST): UTC+2 (CEST)
- Postal code: 8459
- Dialing code: 0513

Luinjeberd (West Frisian: Lúnbert) is a village in the Heerenveen municipality in the province of Friesland, the Netherlands. It had a population of around 430 in January 2017.

== History ==
The village was first mentioned in 1281 as Lyedingaberde, and means "village of the people of Ludo (person)". Luinjeberd was home to 586 people. The bell tower dates from 1921.

Before 1934, Luinjeberd was part of the Aengwirden municipality.

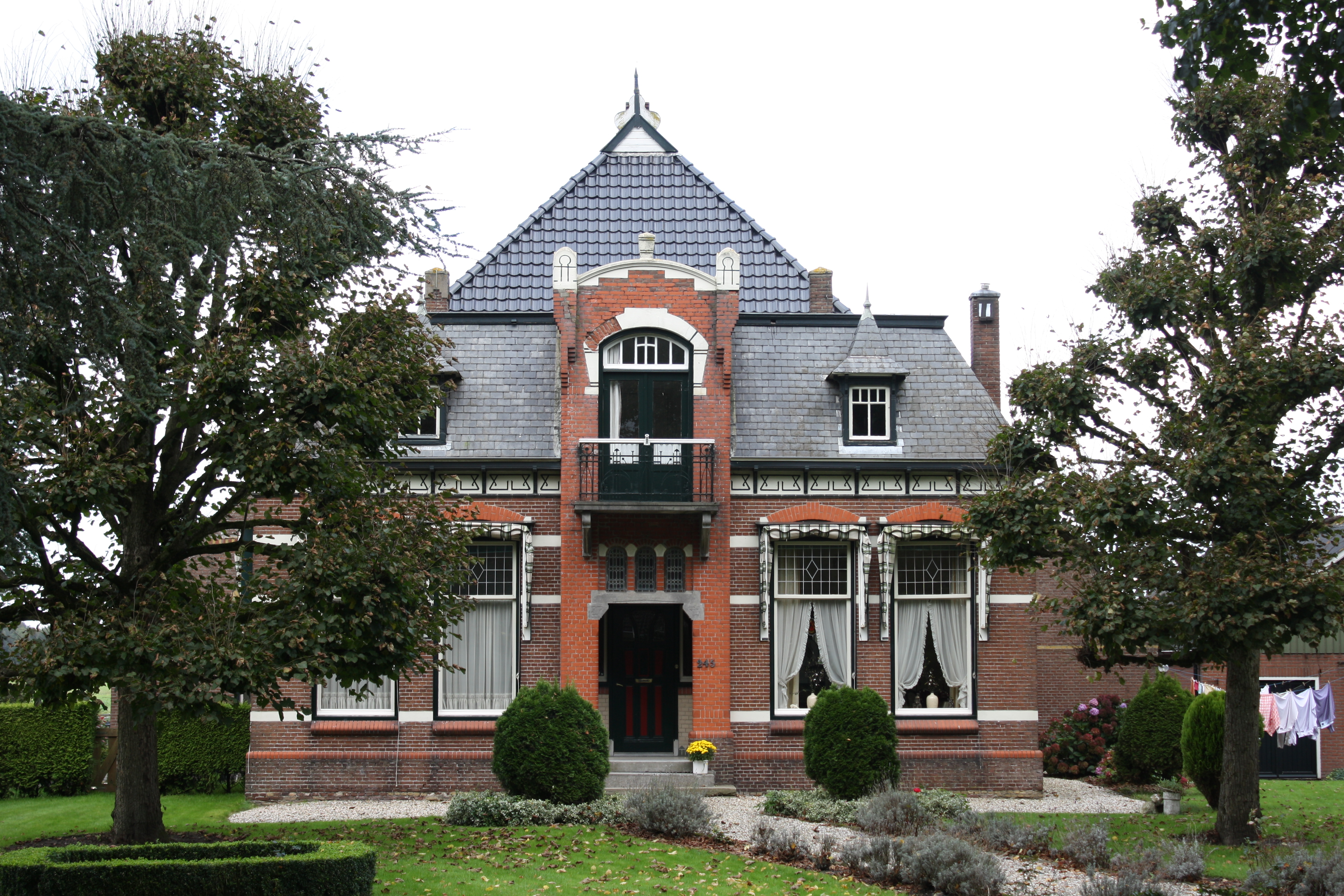
Farm at Luinjeberd
