= Pasma (surname) =

Pasma is a surname. Notable people with the surname include:

- Hendrik Pasma (1813–1890), Dutch writer, farmer and politician
- Tjeerd Pasma (1904–1944), Dutch modern pentathlete
- Patrik Pasma (born 2000), Finnish racing driver

given name

- Pasma Nchouapouognigni (born 1992), Cameroonian handball player
