= Welgelegen, Heerenveen =

Dutch windmill built in 1849

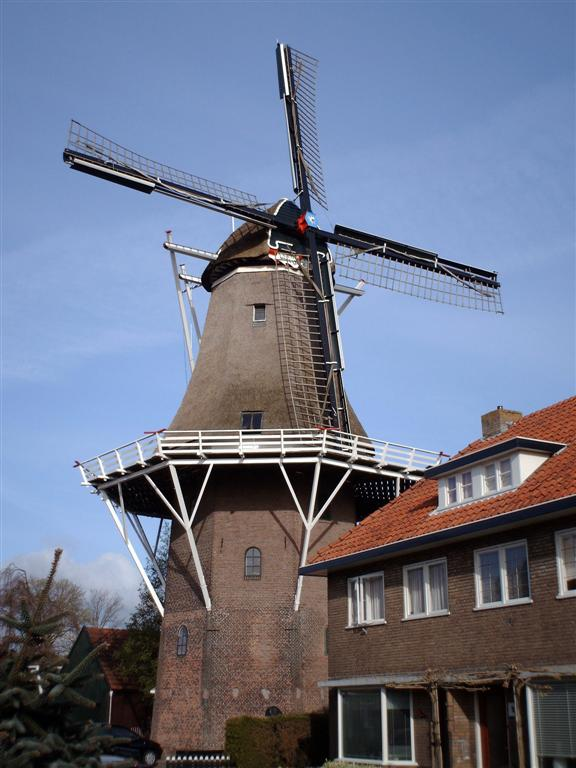
- Welgelegen, May 2007

Origin
- Mill name: Welgelegen; Tjepkema's Molen
- Mill location: Tjepkemastraat, 8841 CD, Heerenveen
- Coordinates: 52°57′49″N 5°55′07″E
- Operator(s): Stichting Molen Welgelegen
- Year built: 1849

Information
- Purpose: Corn mill
- Type: Smock mill
- Storeys: Three-storey smock
- Base storeys: five-storey base
- Smock sides: Eight sides
- No. of sails: Four sails
- Type of sails: Common sails, Fok system streamlining on leading edges
- Windshaft: Cast iron
- Winding: Tailpole and winch
- No. of pairs of millstones: Two pairs
- Size of millstones: One pair Cullen stones 1.20 metres (3 ft 11 in) diameter, one pair French Burr stone 1.40 metres (4 ft 7 in) diameter

Welgelegen (Dutch: [ˈʋɛlɣəˌleːɣə(n)]; "Well-situated") or Tjepkema's Molen (Dutch: [ˈtɕɛpkəmaːs ˈmoːlə(n)]; West Frisian: Tjepkema's Mole [ˈtjɛpkəmaːs ˈmoːlə]; "Tjepka's Mill") is a smock mill in Heerenveen, Friesland, Netherlands, which was built in 1849 and has been restored to working order. The mill is listed as a Rijksmonument, No. 21171.

== History ==
On 20 August 1849, Hermanus Hendrik Kok of Deventer, Overijssel sold a parcel of land at Heerenveen to millwright Willem Frederick Looman of Deventer, Overijssel for ƒ200. A contract was signed that Looman would build the mill and rent it back to Kok for ƒ650 per annum. The mill was built as a rye and barley mill. Kok did not stay long at the mill; Looman sold it within a year of its construction to Fredrik Hessel van Beyma thoe Kingma, who was the public prosecutor in Heerenveen. In 1872, the mill was purchased by Johannes Melis Tjepkema and acquired the name Tjepkema's Molen, by which it is still known by today. In 1898, the mill's base was raised by 6 metres (19 ft 8 in)., giving it a height of 10 metres (32 ft 10 in). The mill ceased working for trade in 1923.

It was sold to a man in Leeuwarden who demolished windmills for a living. Through the intervention of De Hollandsche Molen, the mill was sold to the Gemeente Aengwirden in order to prevent demolition. On 1 September 1931, the mill was sold to the Gemeente Heerenveen for ƒ1,600. The mill was used to store hoses for the local fire brigade and ladders for the parks department of the council. A restoration was undertaken in 1950. In 1974, the mill was repaired so that it was capable of turning by wind again. A further restoration was undertaken in 1976-77 and in 1982 millwright Hiemstra of Tzummarum fitted the French Burr millstones. In 1988, the mill was purchased by the Stichting Molen Welgelegen (English: Welgelegen Mill Society). In 1990, a new cap and internal machinery were fitted by Hiemstra. The mill was officially opened on 25 May 1991 by Burgemeester Reinders. Welgelegen is the only surviving windmill in Heerenveen of the seventeen that have stood at various times since the 15th century.

== Description ==
Welgelegen is what the Dutch describe as a "stellingmolen" (a windmill with a stage). It is a three-storey smock mill on a five-storey base. The stage is at the level of the fifth floor, 11.00 metres (36 ft 1 in) above ground level. The smock and cap are thatched. The mill is winded by tailpole and winch. The sails are Common sails, with the leading edges streamlined on the Fok system. They have a span of 22.40 metres (73 ft 6 in). The sails are carried on a cast-iron windshaft, which was cast by Prins van Oranje, The Hague in 1881. The windshaft also carries the clasp arm brake wheel, which has 59 cogs. This drives the wallower (30 cogs) at the top of the upright shaft. At the bottom of the upright shaft, the great spur wheel, which has 104 cogs, drives the two pairs of millstones. The 1.40 metres (4 ft 7 in) diameter French Burr stones are driven by a lantern pinion stone nut which has 29 staves. The 1.20 metres (3 ft 11 in) diameter Cullen stones are driven by a lantern pinion stone nut which has 27 staves.

== Millers ==
- Hermanus Hendrik Kok (1849–50)
- Fredrik Hessel van Beyma thoe Kingma (1850- )
- Johannes Melis Tjepkema (1872- )

== Public access ==
Welgelegen is open to the public on Saturdays from 09:00 to 12:00.
