= Gersloot =

Gersloot Gersleat
- Village
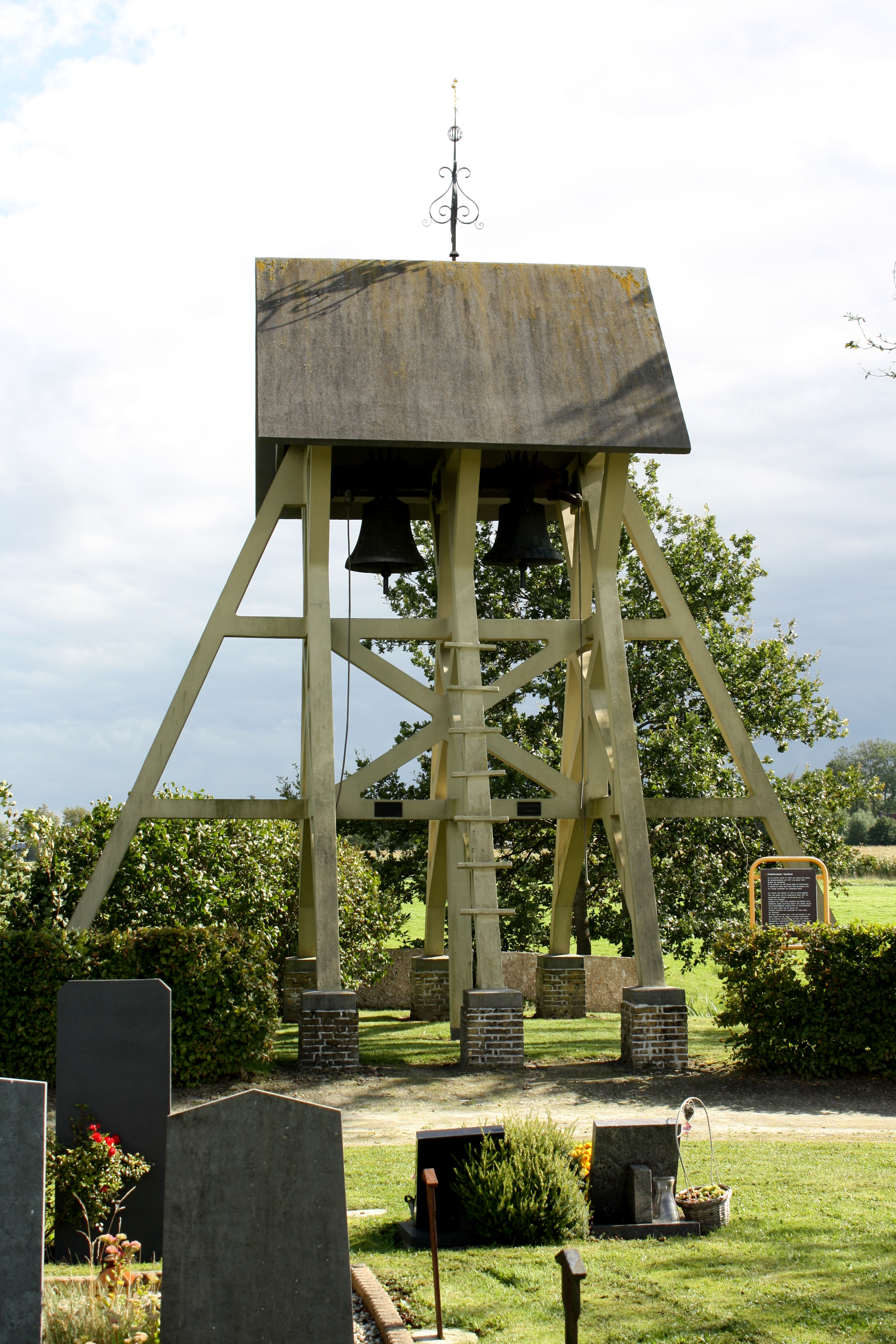
- Bell tower

- Coat of arms

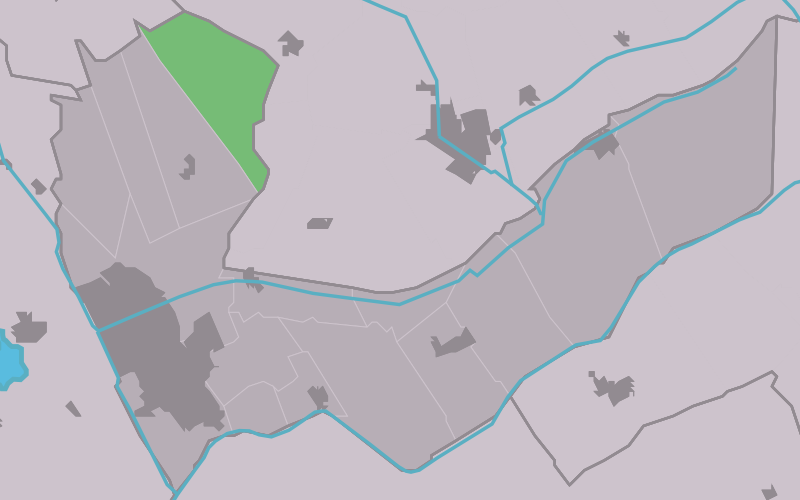
- Location in Heerenveen municipality

- Location in the Netherlands Gersloot (Netherlands)
- Country: Netherlands
- Province: Friesland
- Municipality: Heerenveen

Area
  - Total: 1.48 km^{2} (0.57 sq mi)
- Elevation: −0.8 m (−2.6 ft)

Population (2021)
  - Total: 105
  - Density: 70.9/km^{2} (184/sq mi)
- Time zone: UTC+1 (CET)
  - Summer (DST): UTC+2 (CEST)
- Postal code: 8457
- Dialing code: 0513

Gersloot (West Frisian: Gersleat) is a village in Heerenveen in the province of Friesland, the Netherlands.

The village was first mentioned in 1281 as Gerslach and means tapered ditch. It used to have a church, but it was demolished in 1735, and only the bell tower remains. In 1840, it was home to 146 people. Before 1934, Gersloot was part of the Aengwirden municipality.

== Gallery ==
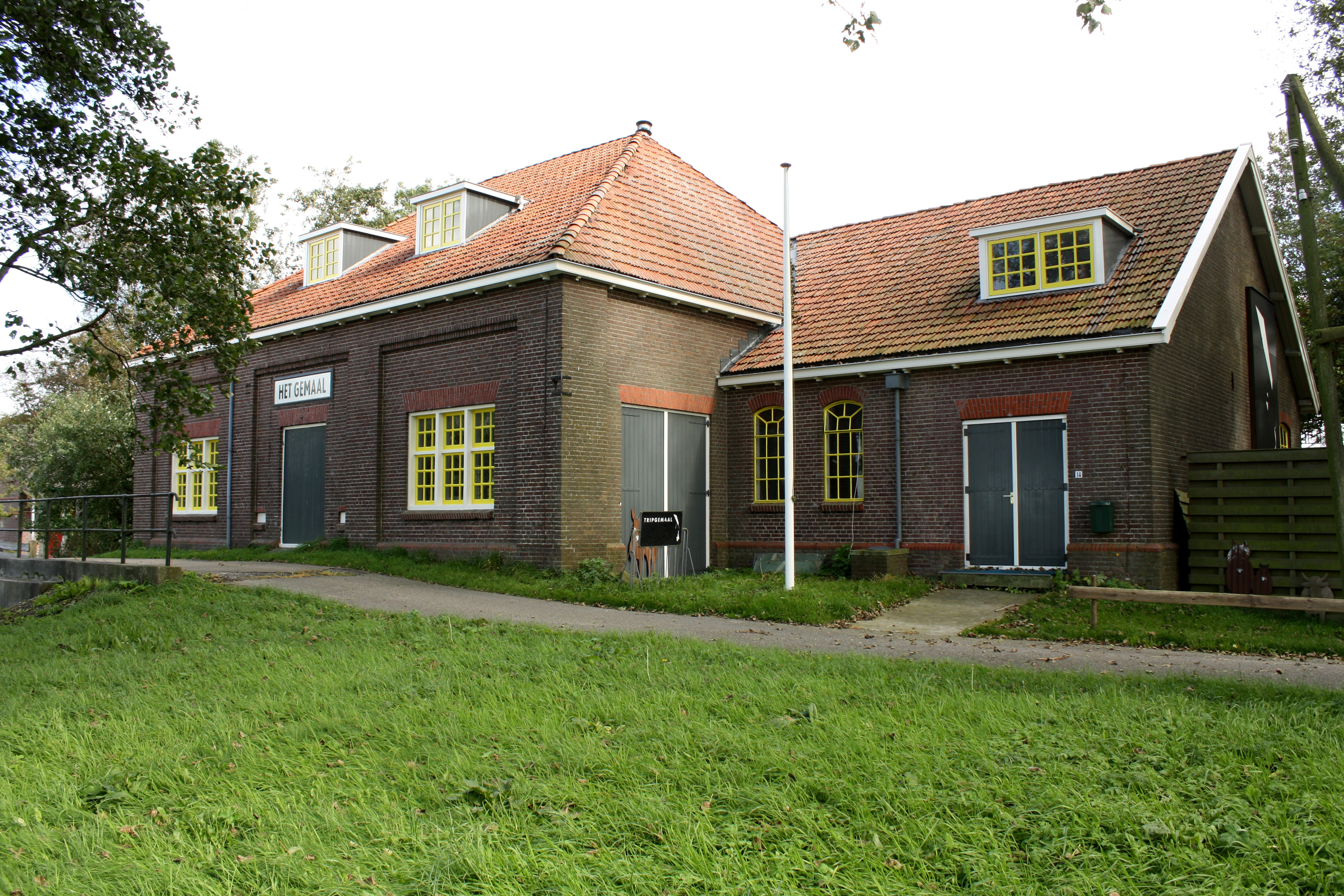
Pumping station Tripgemaal

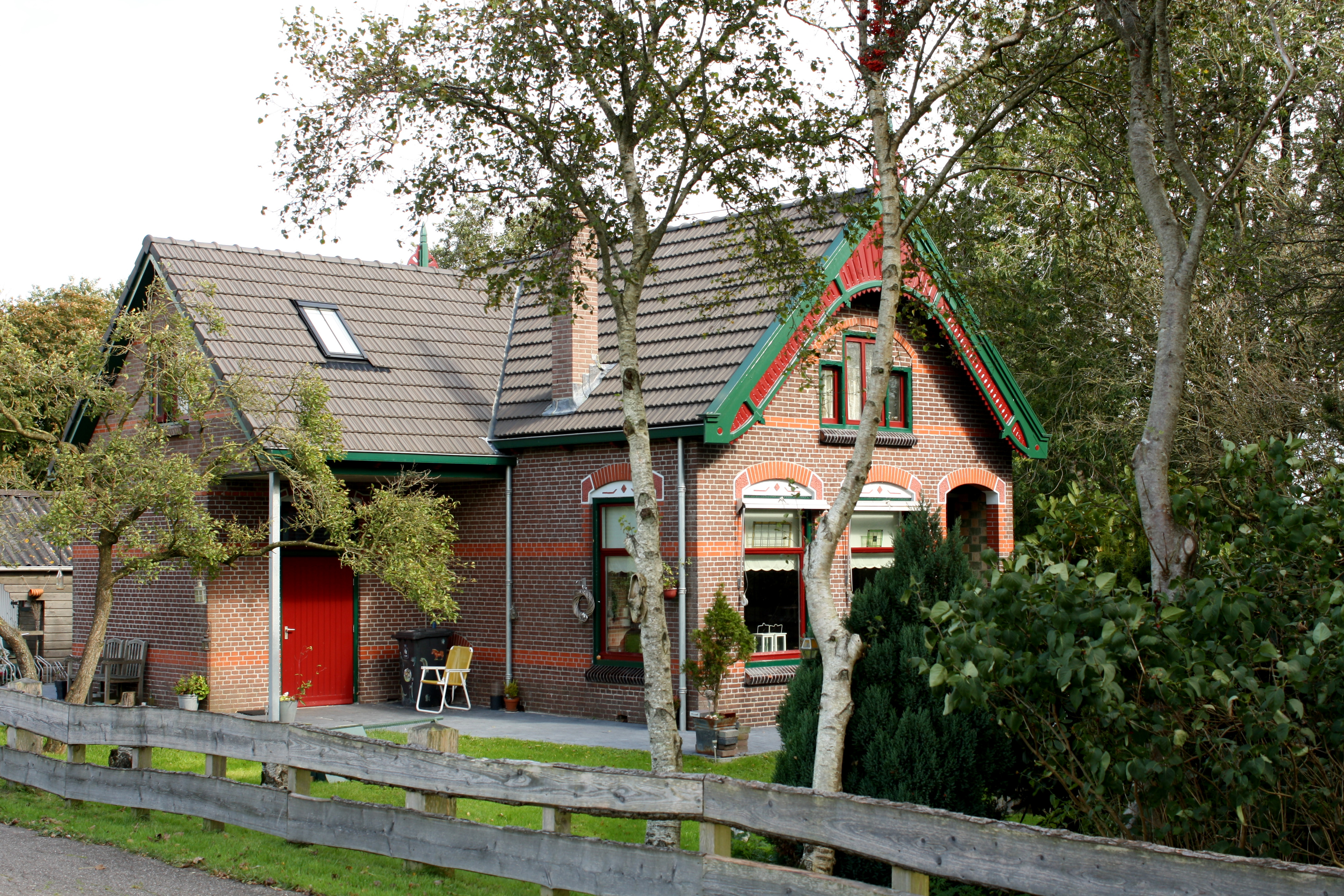
House in Gersloot
