= Hoornsterzwaag =

Hoornsterzwaag Hoarnstersweach
- Village
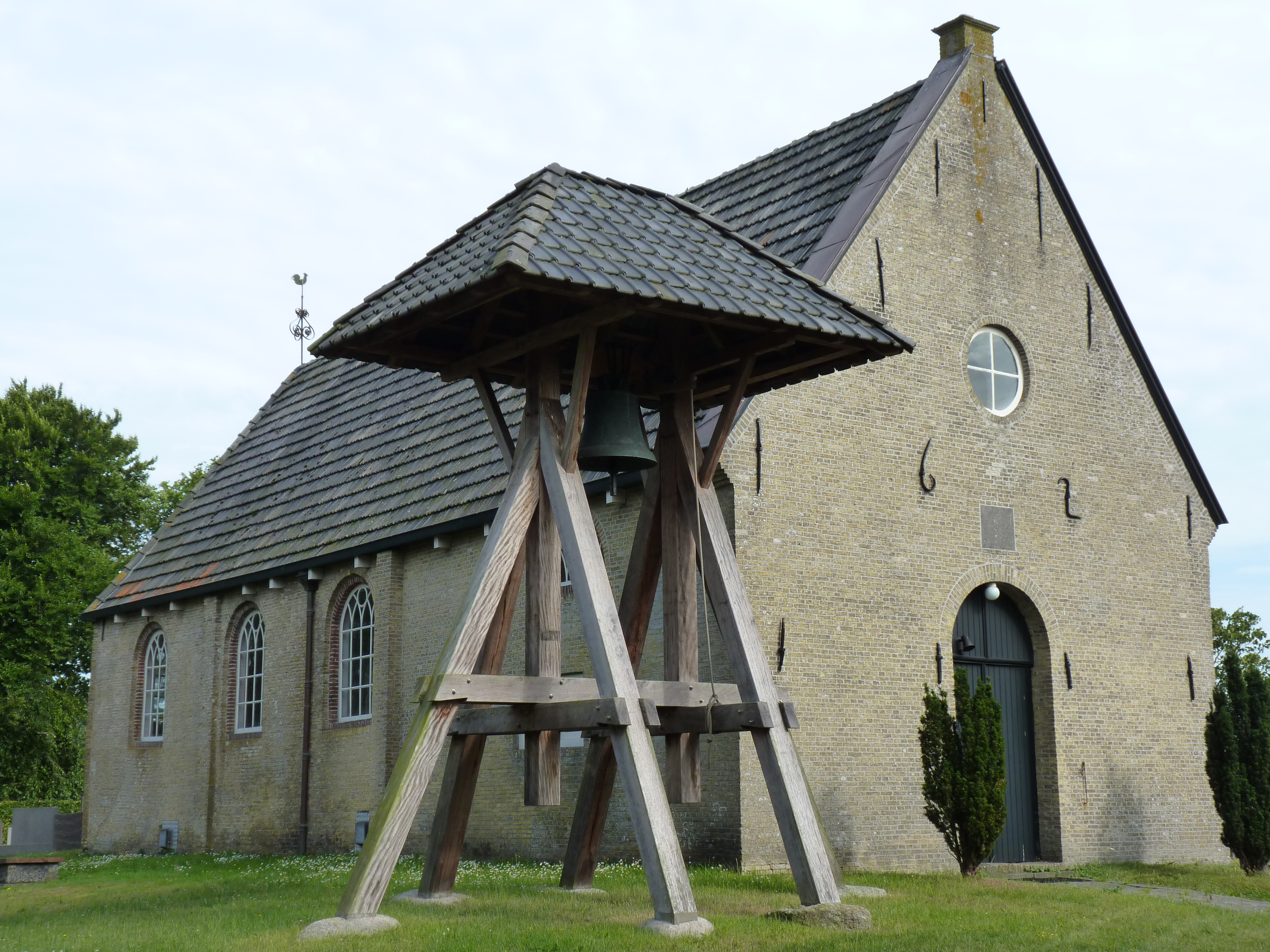
- Hoornsterzwaag church and bell tower

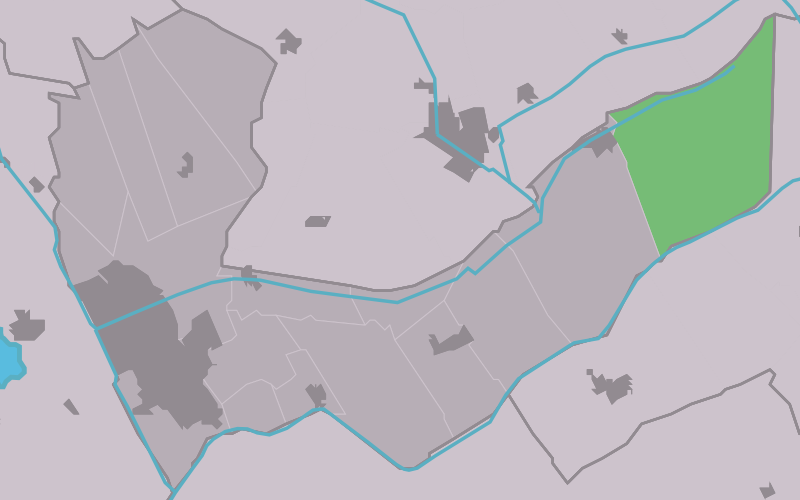
- Location in the Heerenveen municipality

- Location in the Netherlands Hoornsterzwaag (Netherlands)
- Country: Netherlands
- Province: Friesland
- Municipality: Heerenveen

Area
  - Total: 19.90 km^{2} (7.68 sq mi)
- Elevation: 4 m (13 ft)

Population (2021)
  - Total: 810
  - Density: 41/km^{2} (110/sq mi)
- Time zone: UTC+1 (CET)
  - Summer (DST): UTC+2 (CEST)
- Postal code: 8412
- Dialing code: 0513

Hoornsterzwaag (West Frisian: Hoarnstersweach) is a small village in Heerenveen in the province of Friesland, the Netherlands. It had a population of around 830 in January 2017.

== History ==
The village was first mentioned in 1408 as Suage, and means "cattle field belonging to Oudehorne". The church dates from 1621 and was extensively restored in 1856. The current bell tower dates from 2007. In 1840, Hoornsterzwaag was home to 151 people.

Before 1934, Hoornsterzwaag was part of the Schoterland municipality.

== Gallery ==
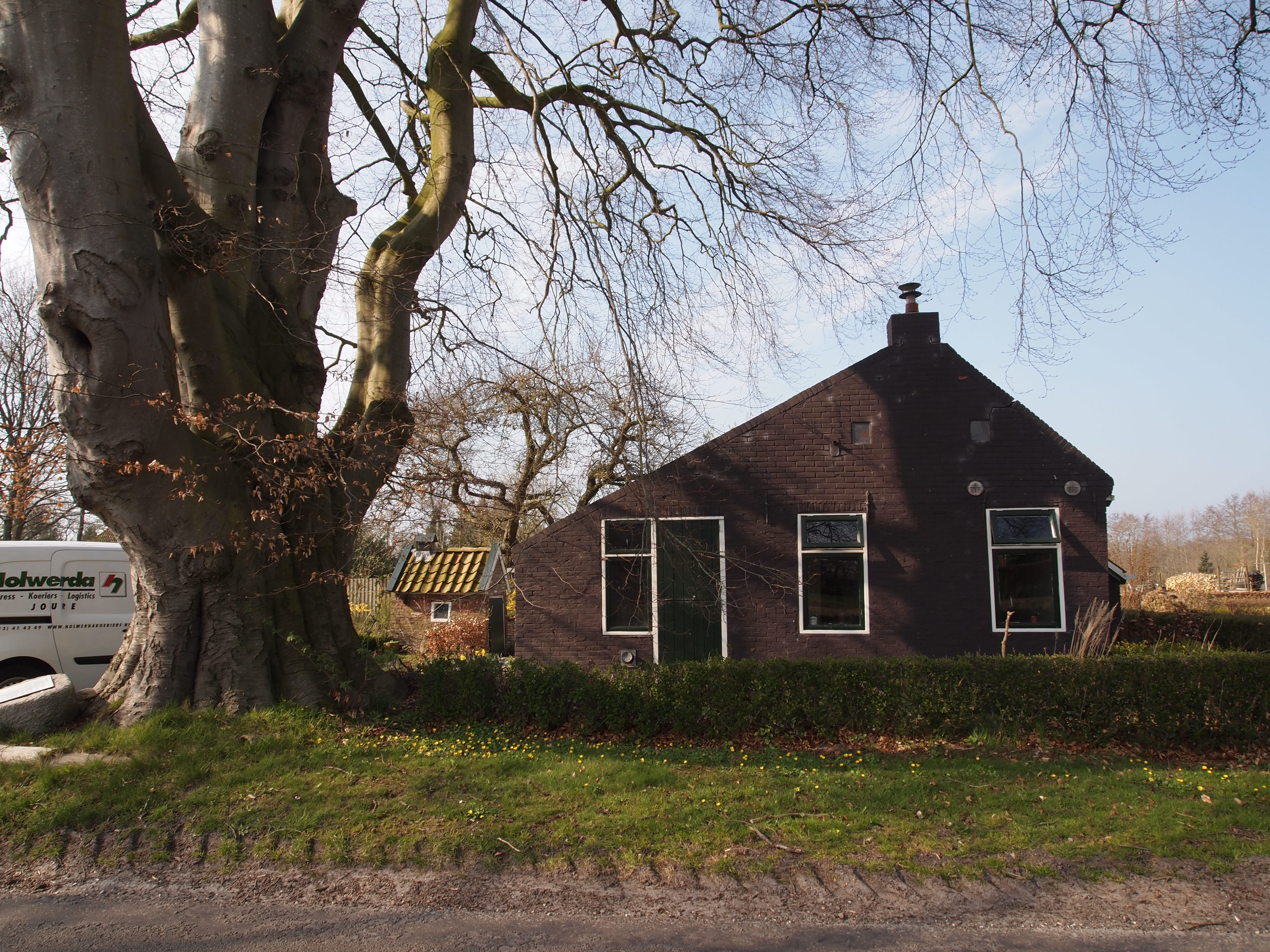
Little house in Hoornsterzwaag

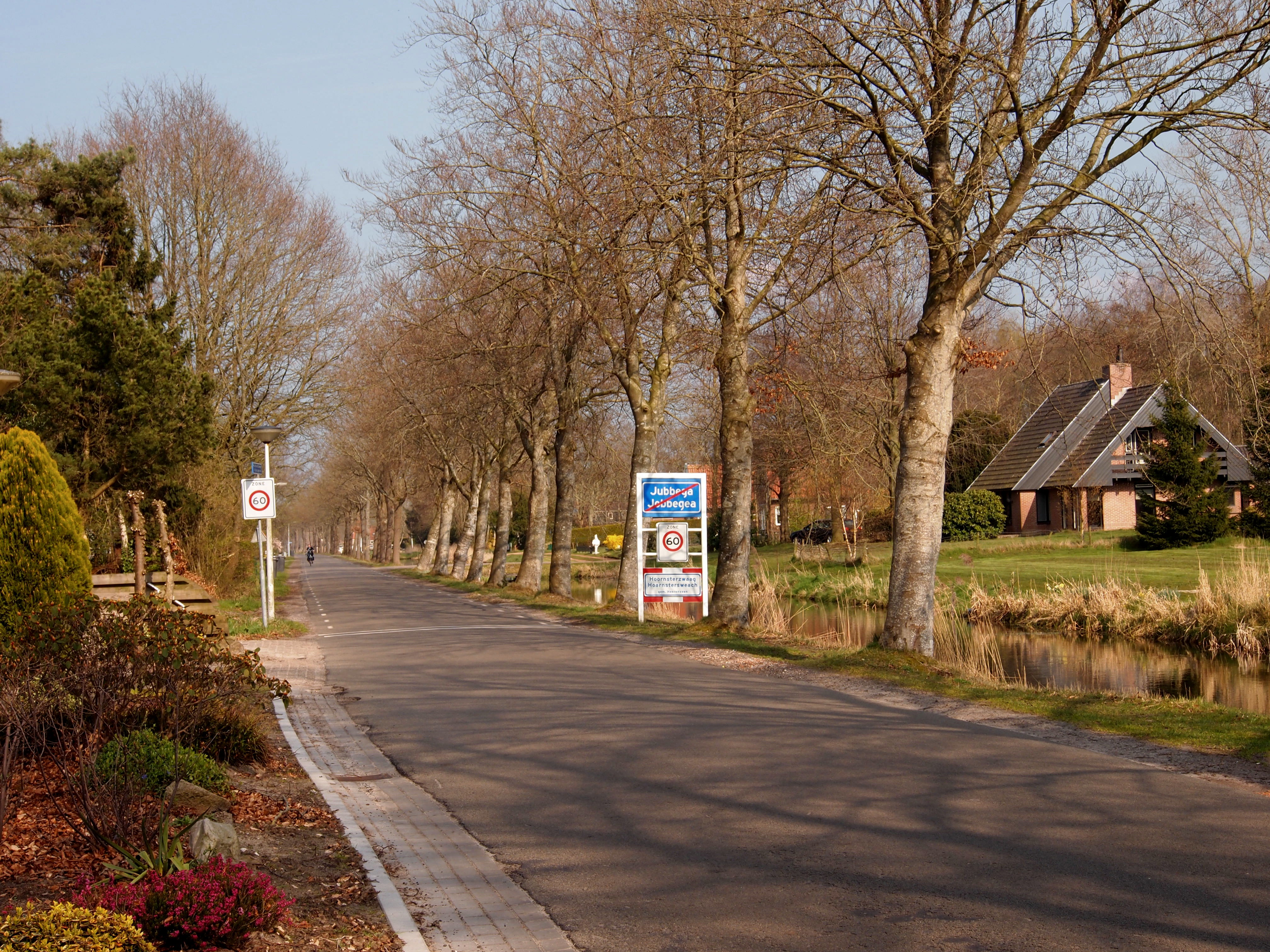
End of Jubbega, start of Hoornsterzwaag

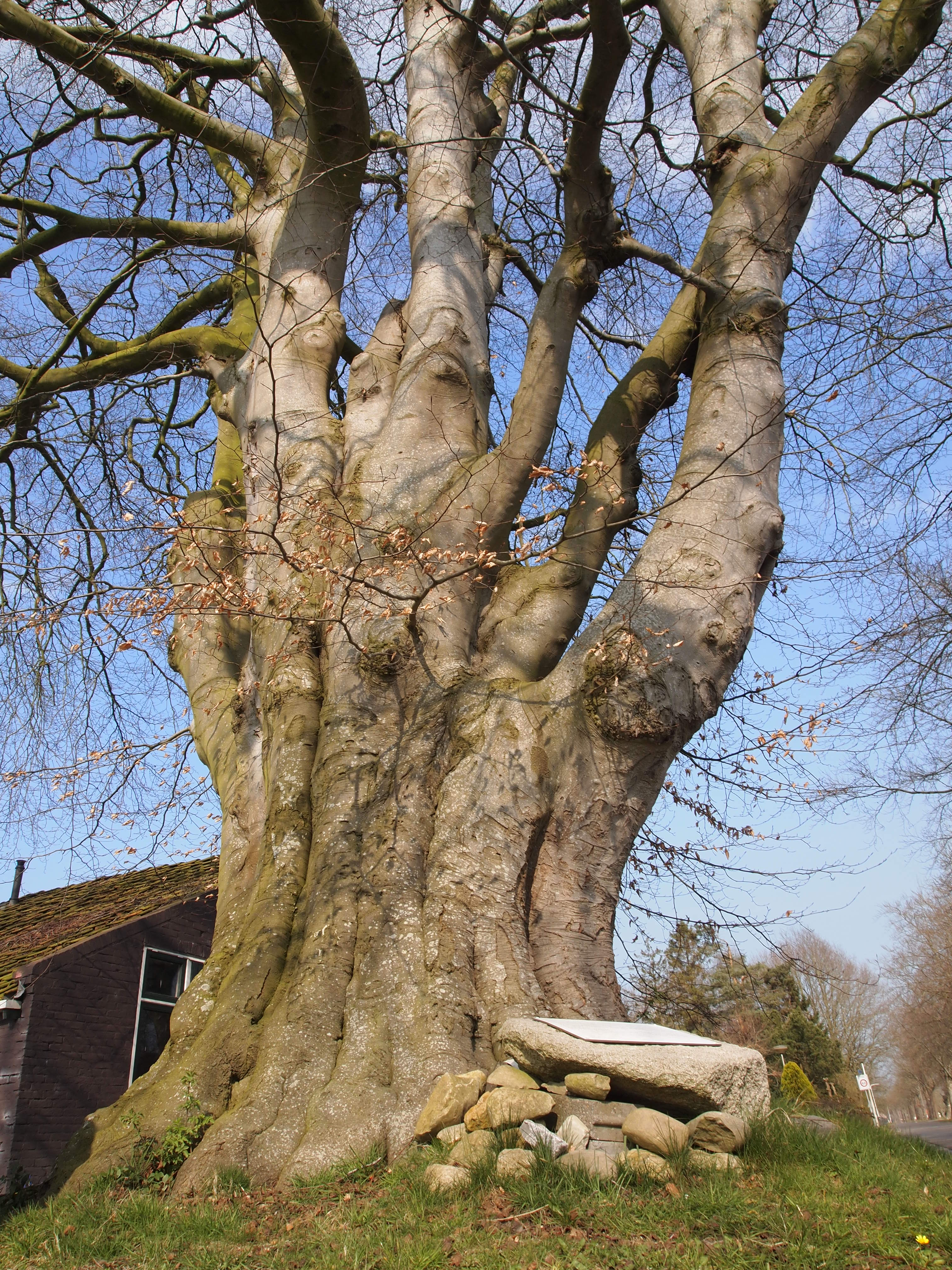
The poppebeam van Jobbega
