= Bontebok, Netherlands =

Bontebok
- Village
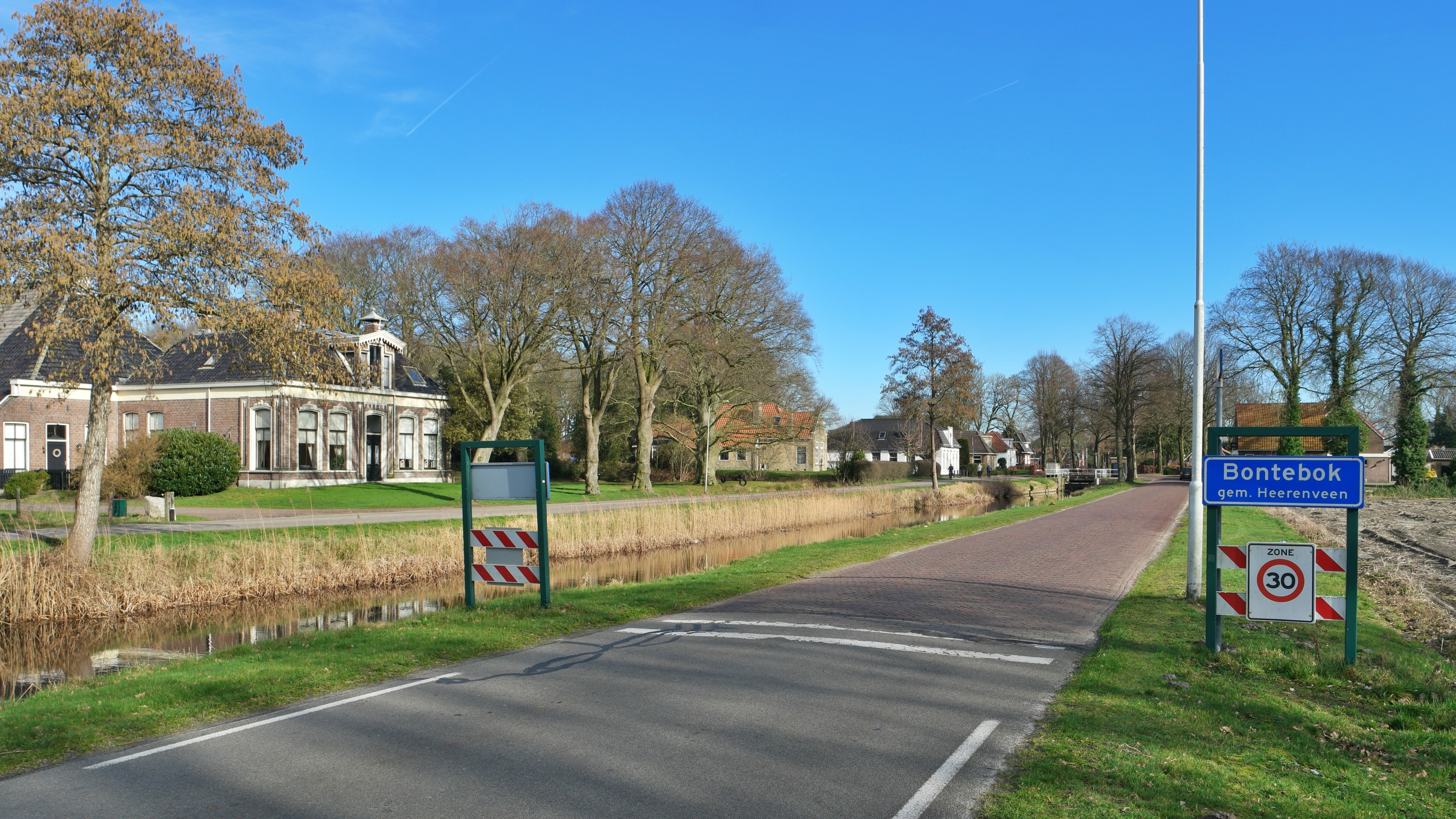
- Local farm and house

- Coat of arms

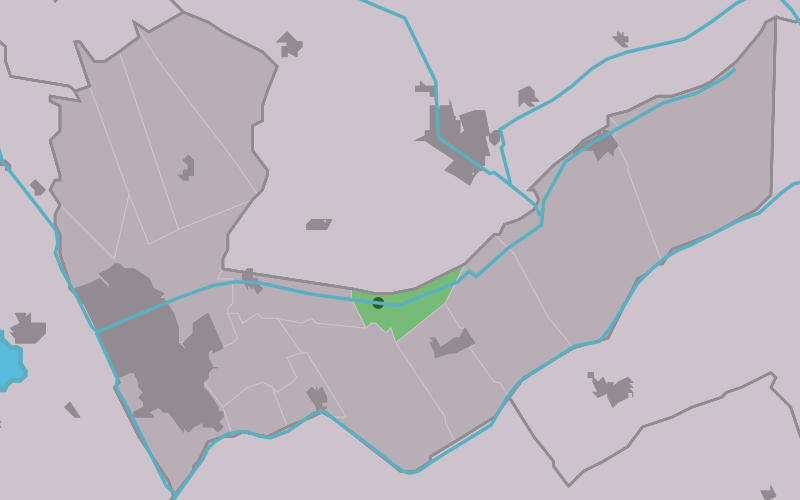
- Location in the Heerenveen municipality

- Location in the Netherlands Bontebok (Netherlands)
- Country: Netherlands
- Province: Friesland
- Municipality: Heerenveen

Area
  - Total: 3.50 km^{2} (1.35 sq mi)
- Elevation: 1.7 m (5.6 ft)

Population (2021)
  - Total: 420
  - Density: 120/km^{2} (310/sq mi)
- Time zone: UTC+1 (CET)
  - Summer (DST): UTC+2 (CEST)
- Postal code: 8415
- Dialing code: 0513

Bontebok is a village in the north of the Netherlands, located in the municipality of Heerenveen, Friesland. It had a population of around 400 in 2017.

== History ==
The village was first mentioned in 1640 as Bonte Bock, and is named after an inn which used a goat as a sign board. Bontebok developed during the peat excavation of the area. The inn was located near a sluice where boatmen had to wait. The inn was later joined by a couple of shops and pubs, and a hamlet developed. In 1840, Bontebok was home to 46 people. From 1898 to 1966, a dairy factory operated in Bontebok. The village was recognized by Heerenveen only in 1980.

== Gallery ==
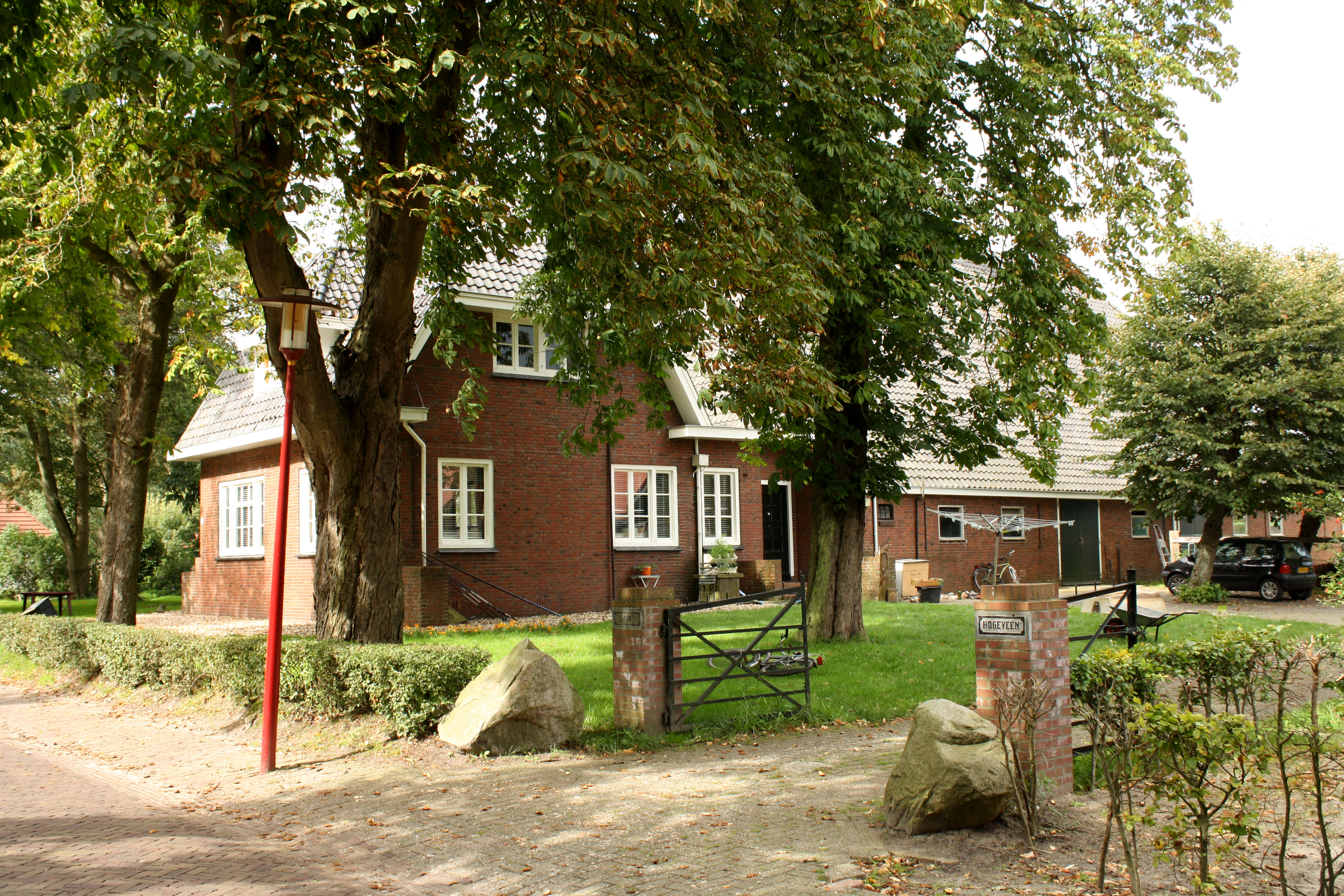
Farm in Bontebok

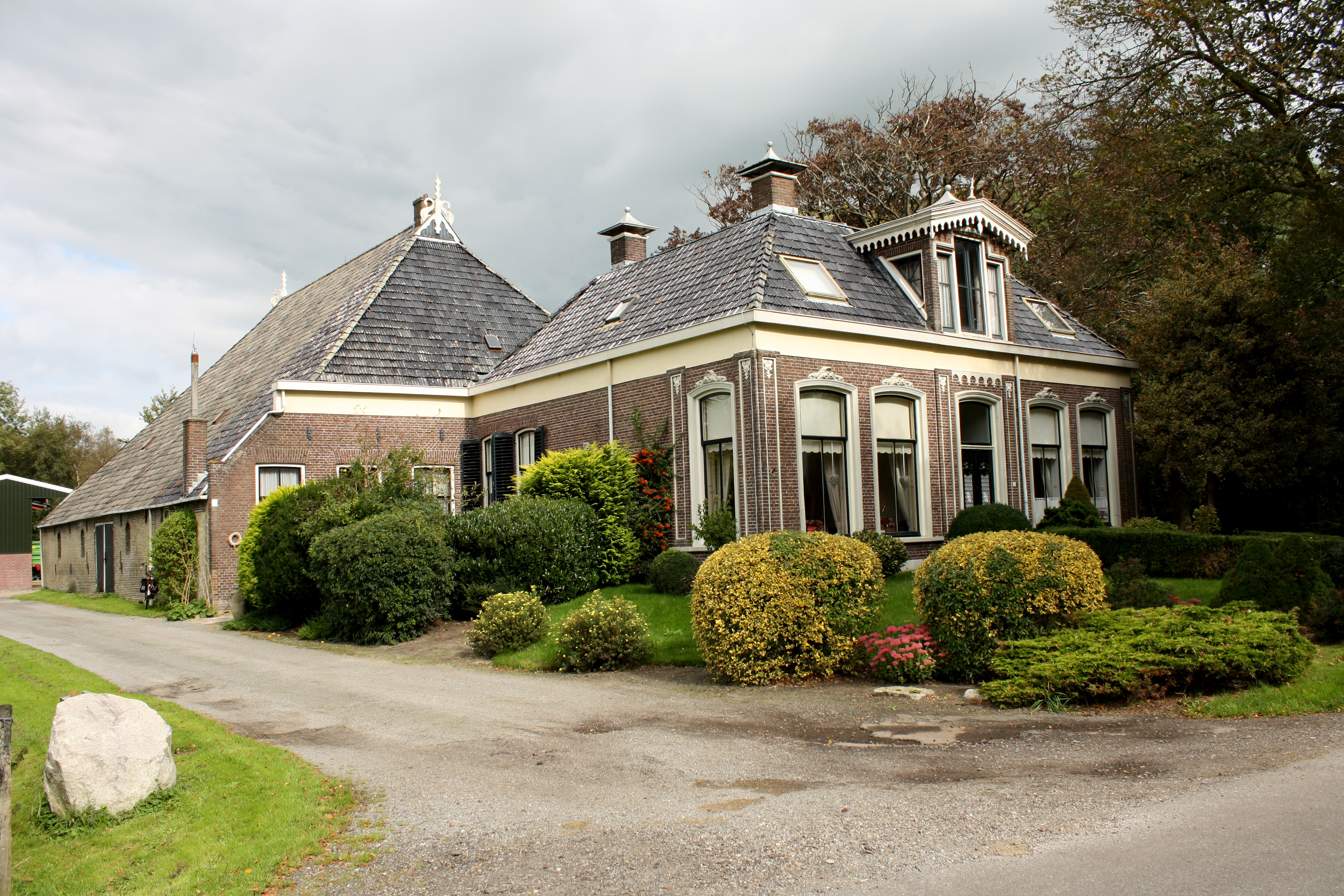
Farm in Bontebok

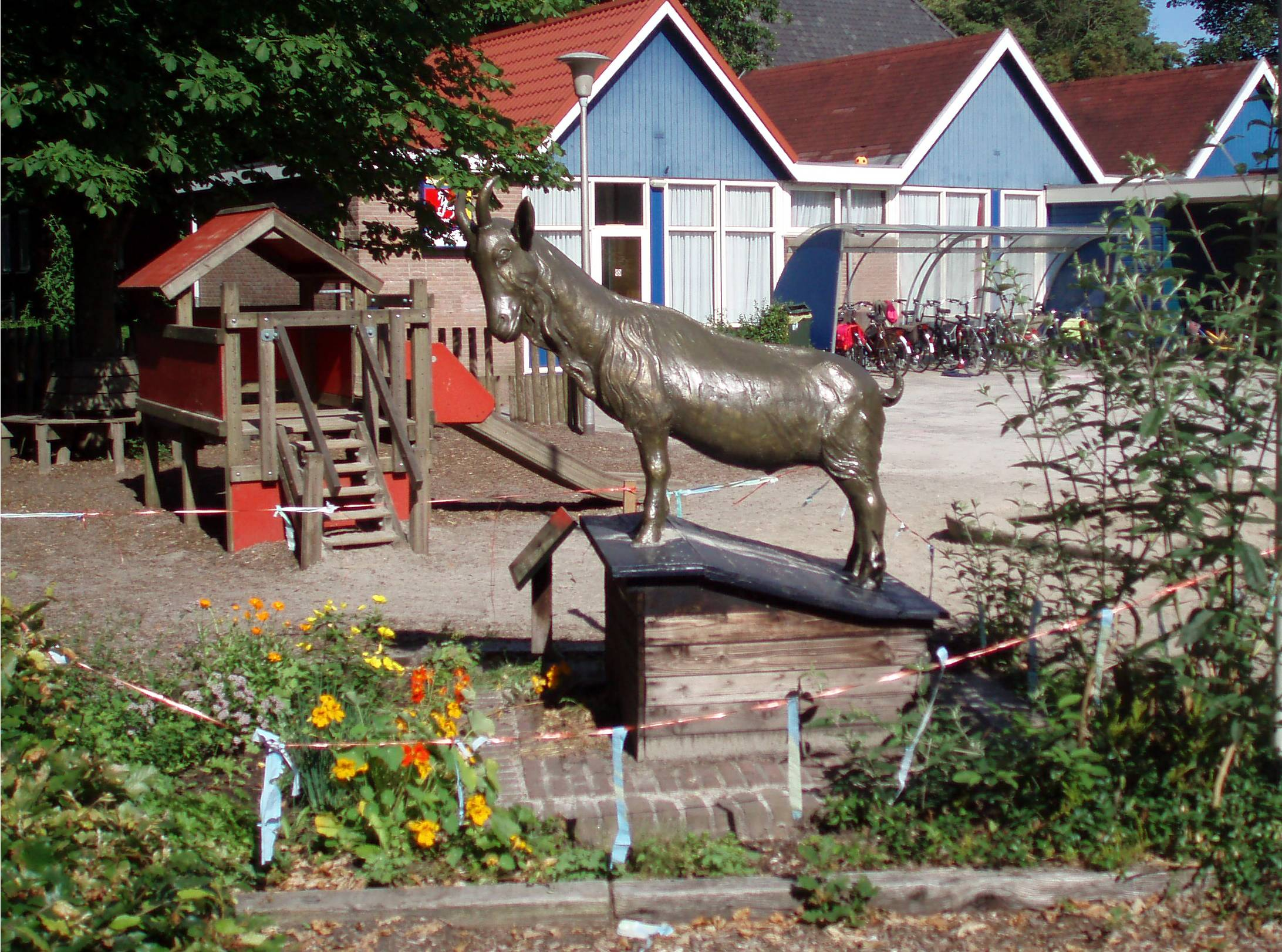
Goat statue

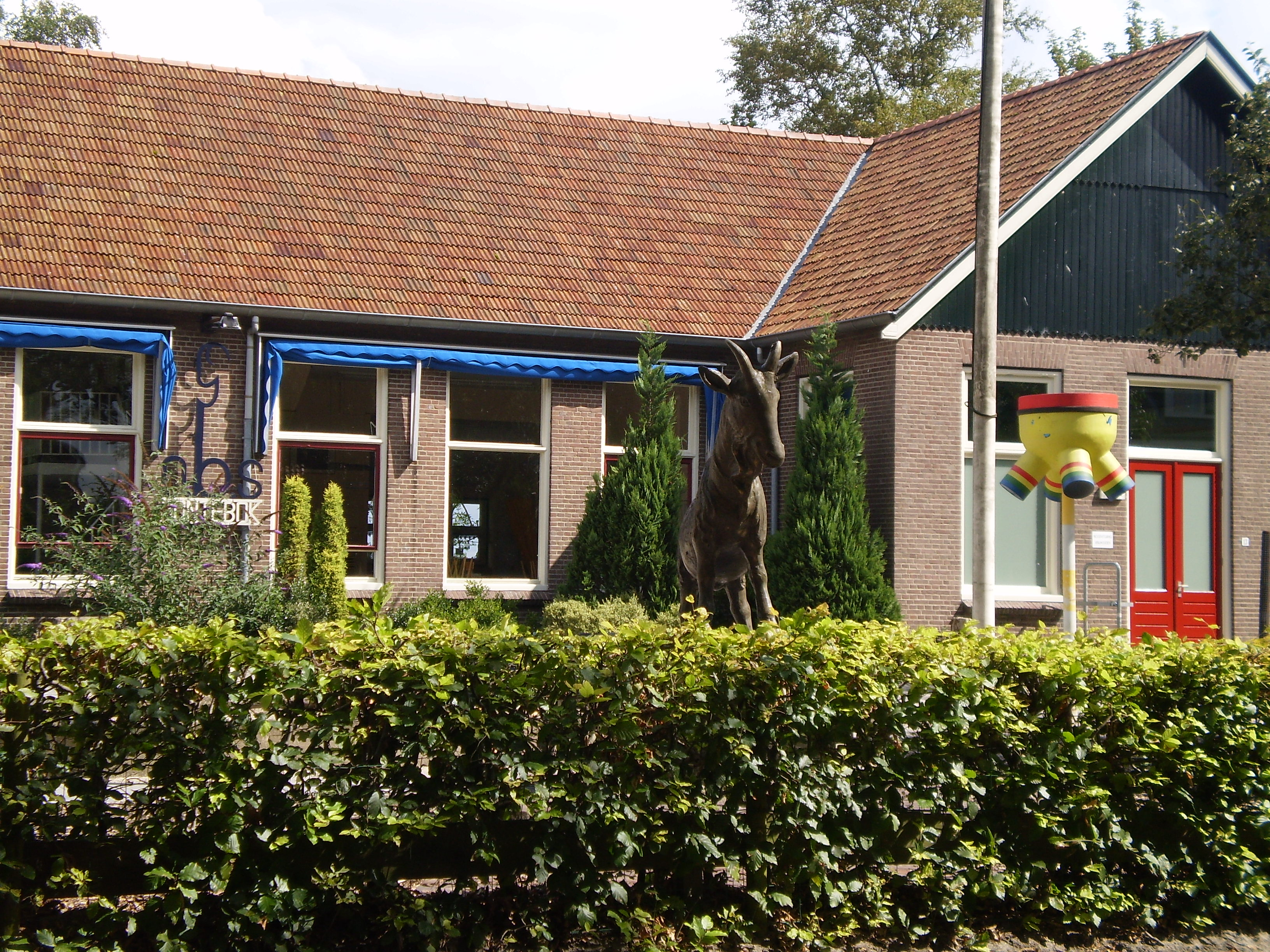
School in Bontebok
