= Tjalleberd =

Tjalleberd Tsjalbert
- Village
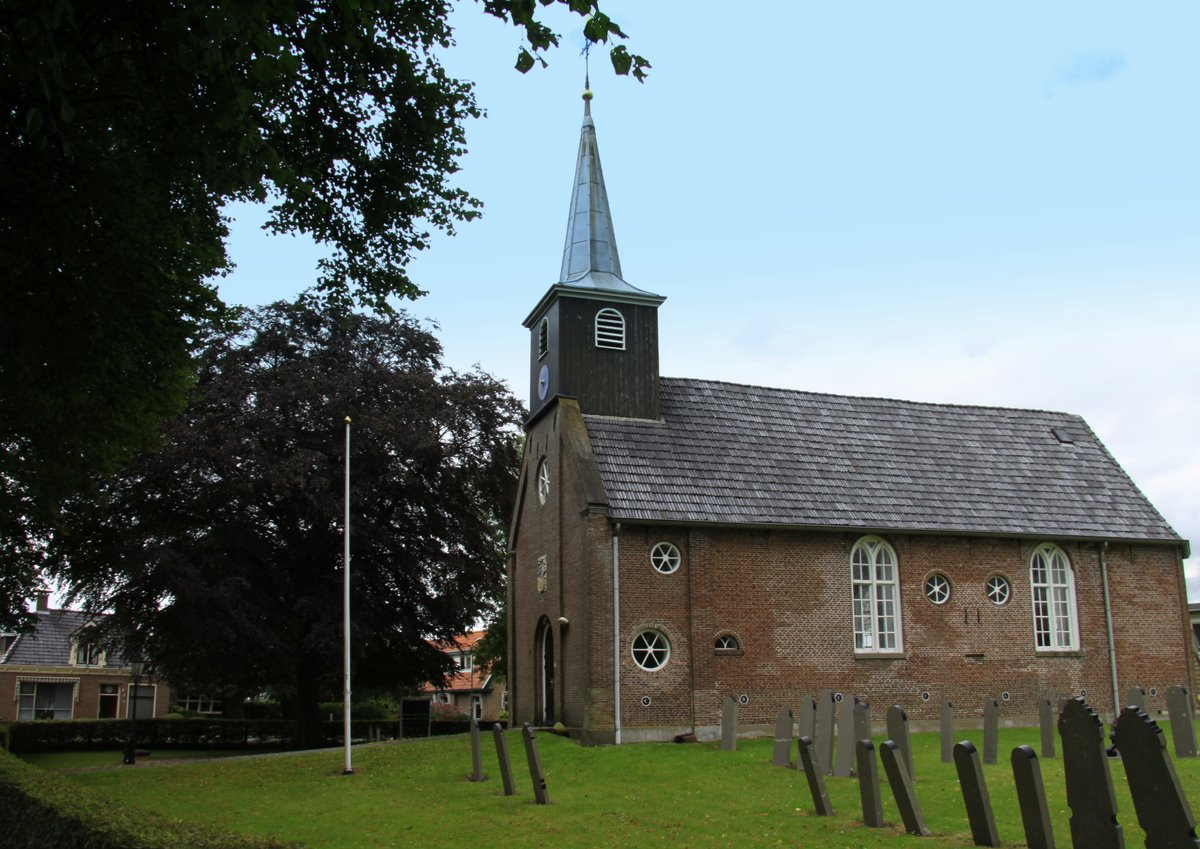
- Aengwirden church

- Coat of arms

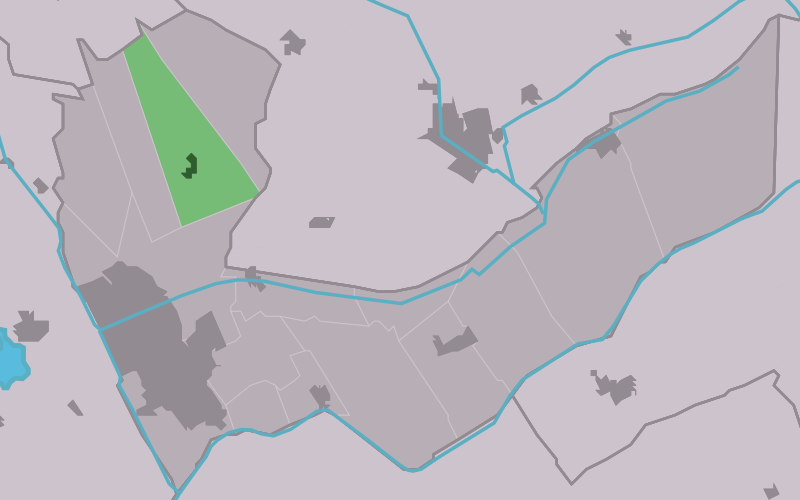
- Location in the Heerenveen municipality

- Location in the Netherlands Tjalleberd (Netherlands)
- Country: Netherlands
- Province: Friesland
- Municipality: Heerenveen

Area
  - Total: 9.30 km^{2} (3.59 sq mi)
- Elevation: −0.2 m (−0.66 ft)

Population (2021)
  - Total: 840
  - Density: 90/km^{2} (230/sq mi)
- Time zone: UTC+1 (CET)
  - Summer (DST): UTC+2 (CEST)
- Postal code: 8458
- Dialing code: 0513

Tjalleberd (West Frisian: Tsjalbert [ˈtsjɔlbət]) is a village in Heerenveen in the province of Friesland, the Netherlands. It had a population of around 820 in January 2017.

== History ==
The village was first mentioned in 1315 as Tyanlaberde, and means the village of Tjalle (person). Tjalleberd developed in the 18th century as road village to cultivate the surrounding land. The Dutch Reformed church dates from 1742. In 1871, a Mennonite church was established. In 1840, Tjalleberd was home to 1,025 people.

Before 1934, Tjalleberd was part of the Aengwirden municipality.

== Gallery ==
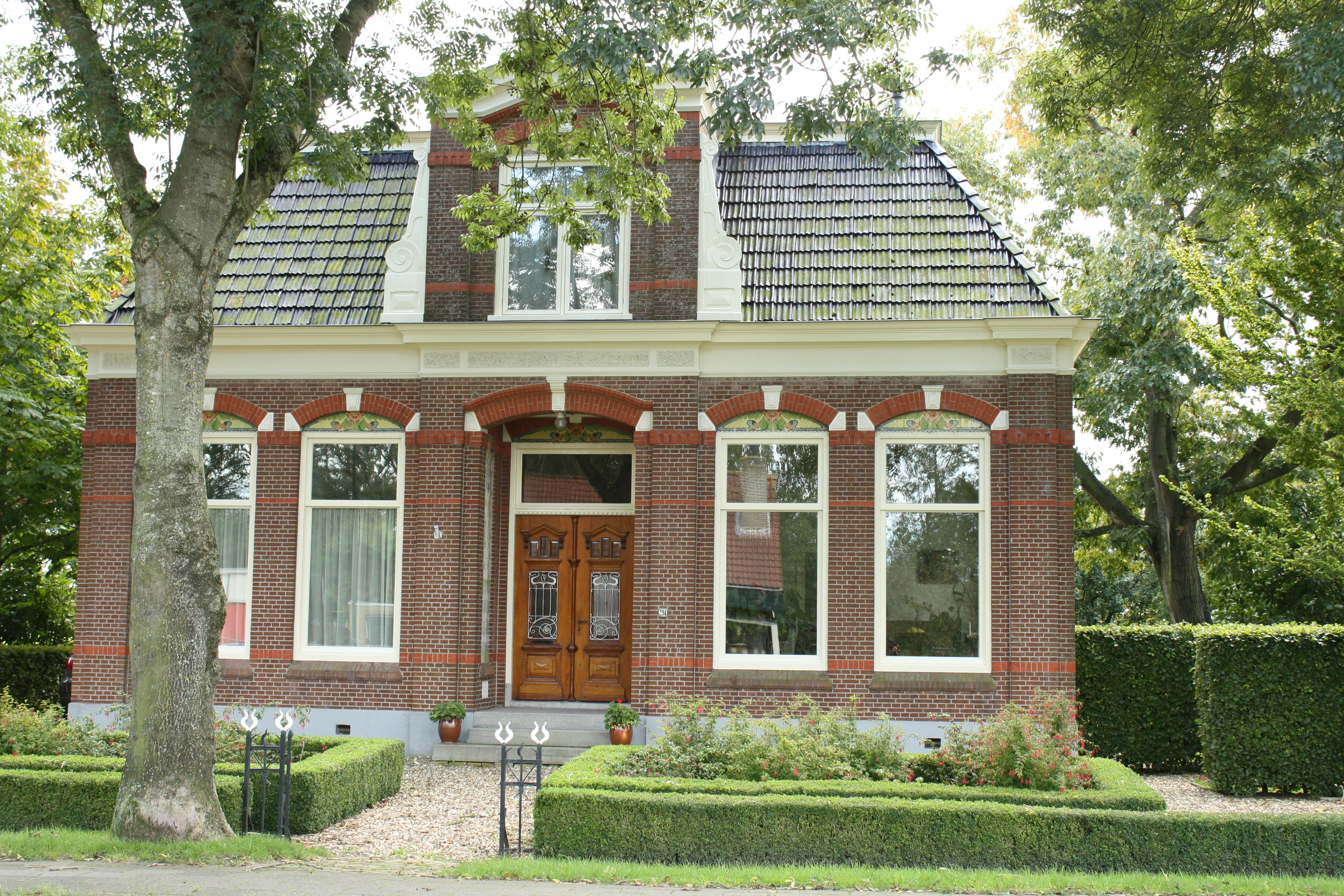
Farm in Tjalleberd

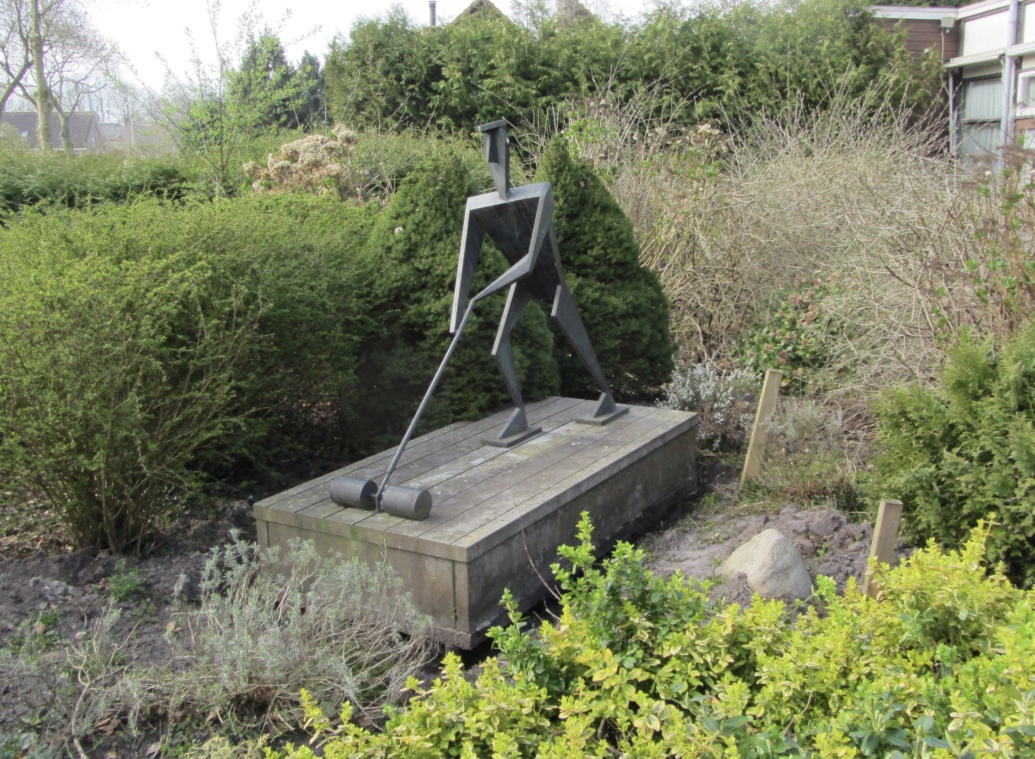
Peat cutter statue
