= Hendrik Pasma =

Dutch writer, farmer and politician

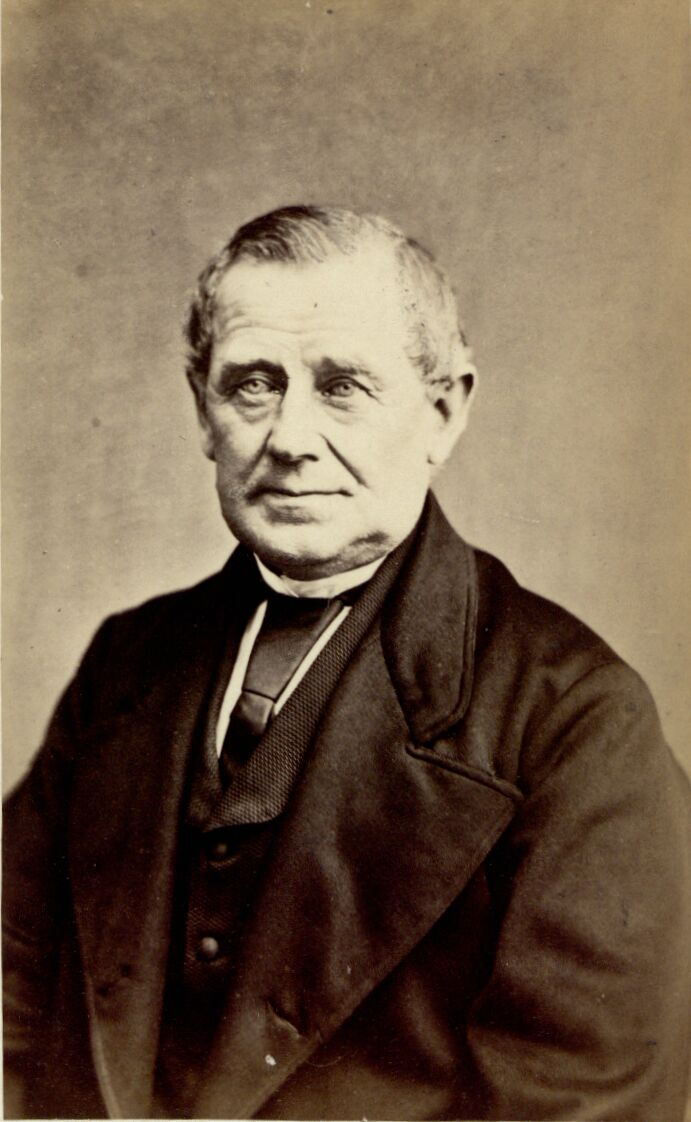
- Hendrik Fzn. Pasma, c. 1880
- Born: 21 July 1813; Heerenveen, French Empire
- Died: 5 December 1890 (aged 77); Heerenveen, the Netherlands
- Occupations: Farmer, politician, writer
- Notable work: Frieslands boezemwater in zijn aanvoer, doorvoer en afvoer, 1868
- Spouse: Fokje Jdr. Fokma (m. 1837)
- Children: 7

Hendrik Fzn. Pasma (21 July 1813 – 5 December 1890) was a writer, farmer and politician in the province of Friesland, the Netherlands.

Pasma was an advocate for Frisian agricultural and council interests. For the first, he was a member of merit of the Frisian Society of Agriculture in light of his efforts to improve dairy farming and processing, which had led Pasma to Denmark to study local farms. For the other, he was an alderman on the municipal council of Haskerland and a member of the Provincial Council of Friesland.

Though Pasma had enjoyed a modest formal education in his youth, he proved an avid student and reader, which came to serve him well in his career. In 1868, Pasma published an important pamphlet on rinderpest and was a known speaker at agricultural meetings. In 1879, he was one of the founders of the Frisian Cattle Studbook. At the request of the municipal council of Kampen, Pasma established a model farm on the Kampereiland.

Also in 1868, he published a study on improving drainage using water pumps and canals, titled Frieslands boezemwater in zijn aanvoer, doorvoer en afvoer. Pasma's findings were subsequently adopted by the provincial government.

He was also a deacon of the Mennonite community in Heerenveen. Pasma was married to Fokje Jdr. Fokma, both were Mennonites. He was also an avid poet.
