= T. S. van Albada =

Dutch astronomer (born 1936)

Tjeerd Sicco van Albada (born 14 October 1936) is a Dutch astronomer who was professor of astronomy at the University of Groningen between 1980 and 2001.

== Career ==
Van Albada was born on 14 October 1936 in Akkrum. He obtained his PhD in mathematics and natural sciences from the University of Groningen in 1968. His thesis was titled: The Evolution of small stellar systems and its implications for the formation of double stars. Van Albada was lecturer of astronomy at the University of Groningen between 1971 and 1979. In 1980 he became professor of astronomy, and worked at the Kapteyn Astronomical Institute. He served as director of the institute between 1994 and 1998. He took up emeritus status in 2001.

Van Albada became a member of the Royal Netherlands Academy of Arts and Sciences in 1984. He is a member of the International Astronomical Union.

== Honors ==
On 5 July 2001, the central main-belt asteroid 10435 Tjeerd, discovered during the Palomar–Leiden survey in 1960, was named after him (M.P.C. 43044).

== Personal ==
- Gale Bruno van Albada was an uncle of Tjeerd van Albada.
