= Aengwirden =

Aengwirden Aengwirden
- Former municipality
- Flag Coat of arms

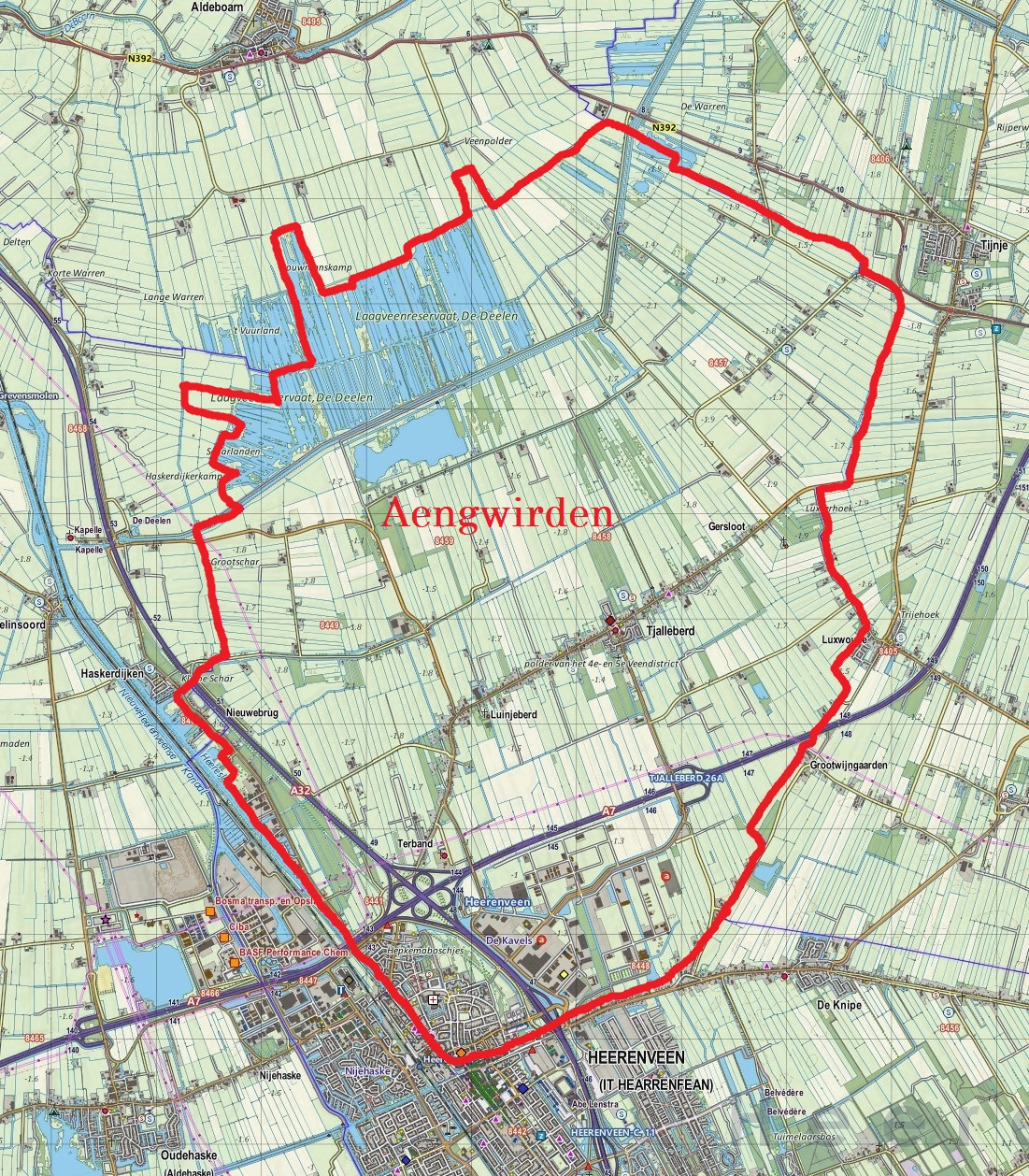
- Aengwirden on map from 2013
- Coordinates: 53°0′N 5°55′E
- Country: Netherlands
- Province: Friesland
- Dissolved: 1 July 1934

Aengwirden is a former municipality in the Dutch province of Friesland. It covered the area around the village of Tjalleberd. It existed until July 1, 1934.

The area of the former municipality is now a part of the municipality of Heerenveen.
