= Ferwerderadiel =

Ferwerderadiel Ferwerderadeel
- Municipality
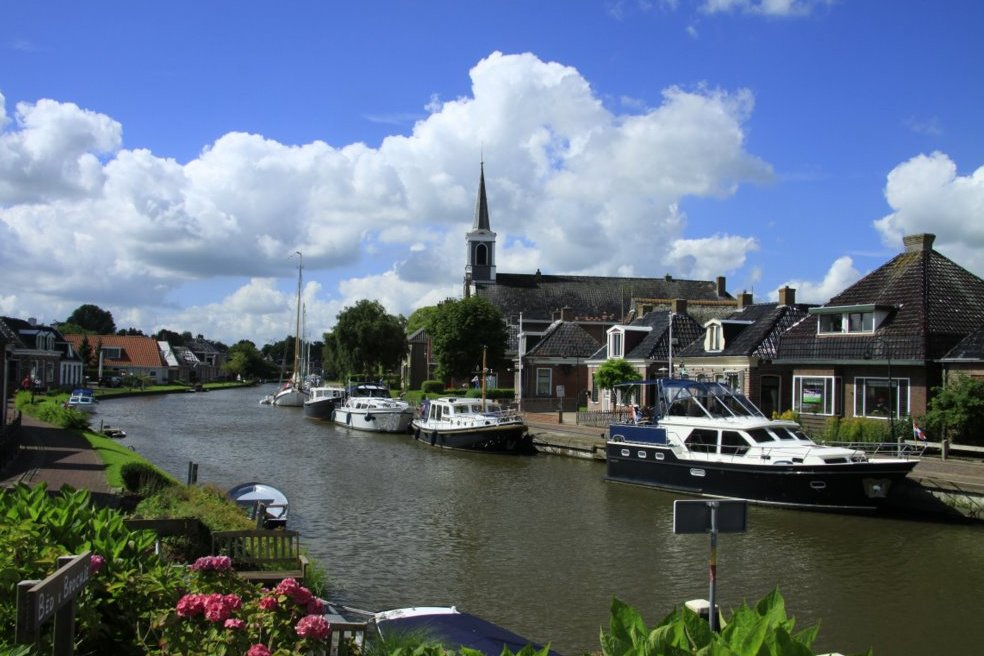
- Canal through Burdaard

- Flag Coat of arms

- Location in Friesland
- Coordinates: 53°20′N 5°50′E
- Country: Netherlands
- Province: Friesland
- Merged: 2019

Area
  - Total: 133.18 km^{2} (51.42 sq mi)
  - Land: 97.71 km^{2} (37.73 sq mi)
  - Water: 35.47 km^{2} (13.70 sq mi)
- Elevation: 1 m (3.3 ft)

Population (January 2021)
  - Total: data missing
- Time zone: UTC+1 (CET)
  - Summer (DST): UTC+2 (CEST)
- Postcode: 9070–9179
- Area code: 0518, 0519, 058
- Website: www.ferwerderadiel.nl

Ferwerderadiel is a former municipality of Friesland in the northern Netherlands. Its official name is West Frisian, the Dutch name is Ferwerderadeel (pronounced [fɛrˈʋɛrdəraːˌdeːl]). In 2019 it merged with the municipalities of Dongeradeel and Kollumerland en Nieuwkruisland to form the new municipality Noardeast-Fryslân.

== Population centres ==
Bartlehiem, Blije, Burdaard, Ferwert, Ginnum, Hallum, Hegebeintum, Jannum, Jislum, Lichtaard, Marrum, Reitsum, Wânswert, Westernijtsjerk.

=== Topography ===
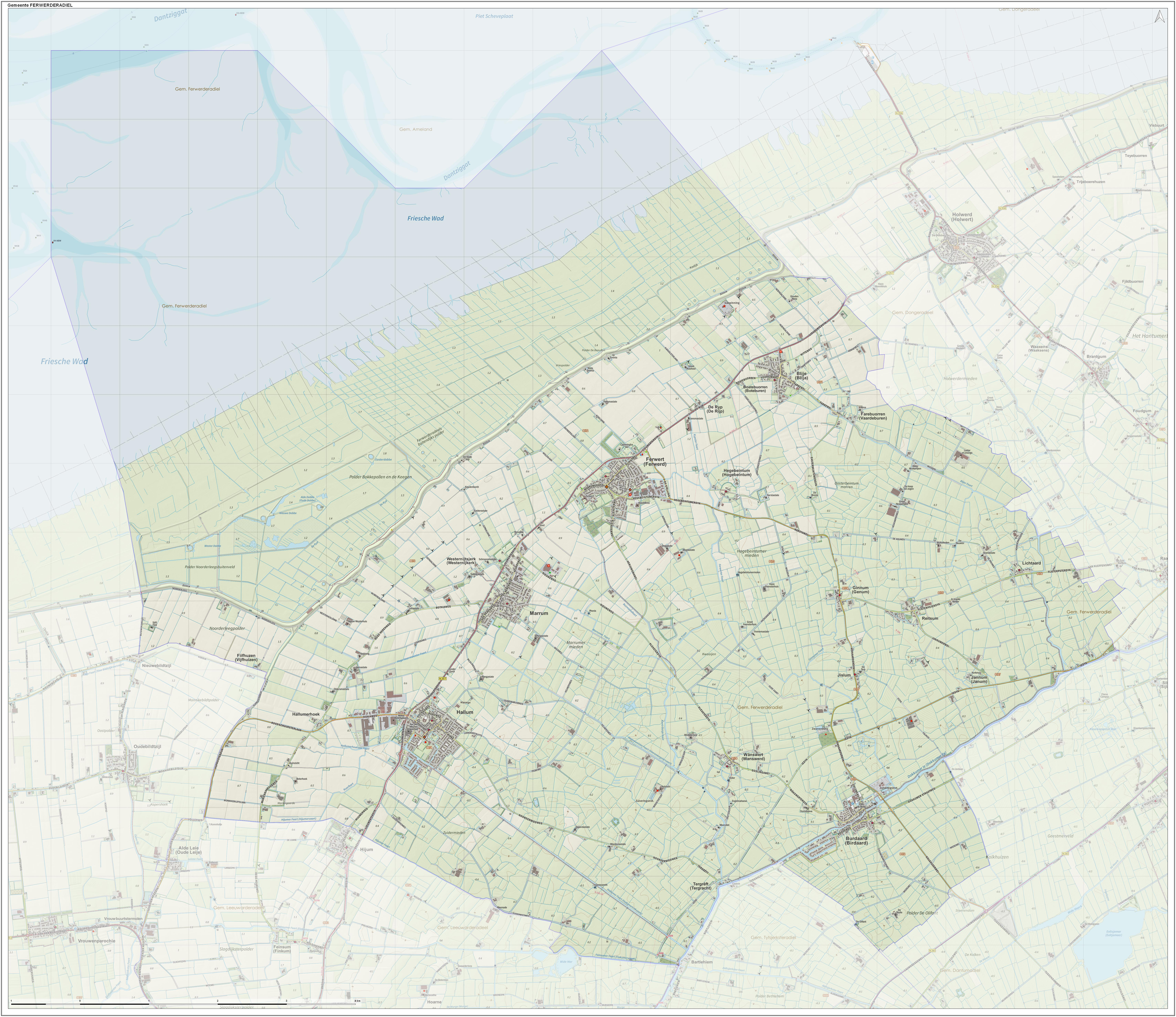

'Dutch topographic map of the municipality of Ferwerderadiel, June 2015

== Notable people ==
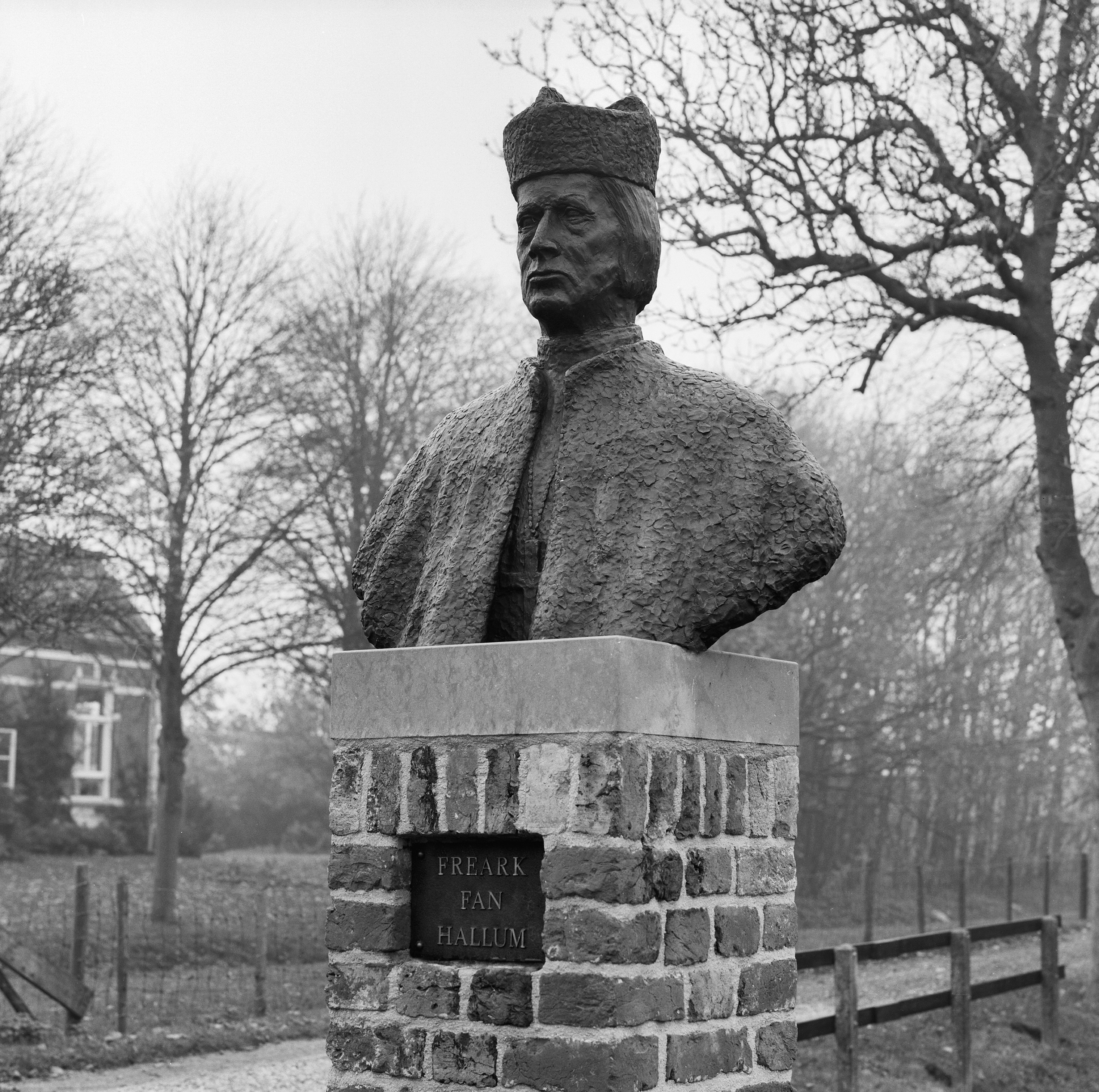
St. Fredk. van Hallum

- Saint Frederick of Hallum (ca. 1113 – 1175) a Premonstratensian priest
- Barthold Douma van Burmania (1695 in Hallum – 1766) a Dutch statesman and ambassador to the court of Vienna
- Pieter Boeles (1795 in Ferwerd – 1875) a Dutch Minister and linguist
- Gerardus Heymans (1857 in Ferwert – 1930) a Dutch philosopher, psychologist and academic
- Watse Cuperus (1891 in Blije – 1966) a Dutch journalist and writer in the West Frisian language
- Eeltsje Boates Folkertsma (1893 in Ferwert – 1968) a West Frisian language writer
- Maria Sterk (born 1979 in Hallum) a Dutch marathon speed skater

== Gallery ==
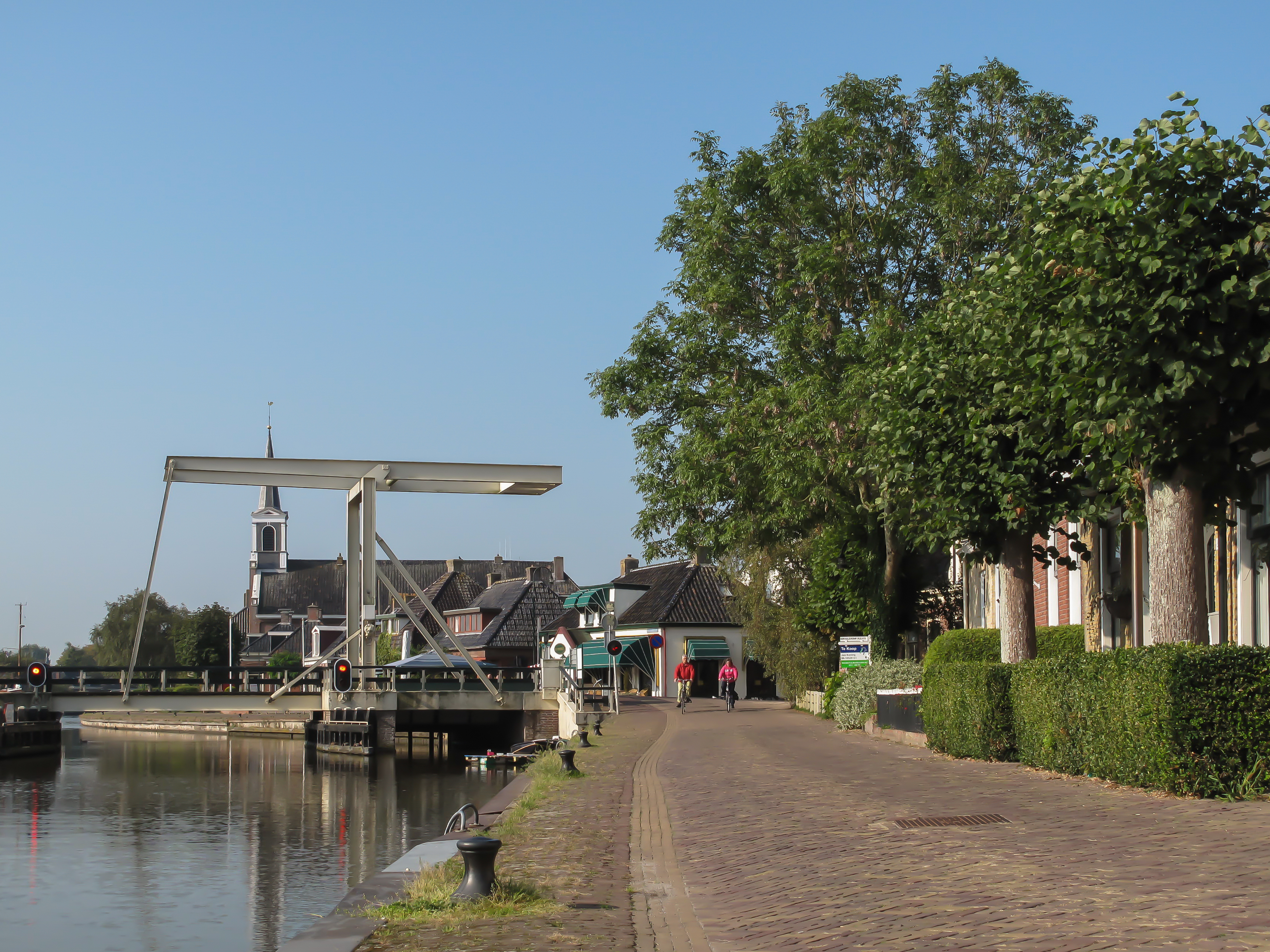
Birdaard, drawbridge and church

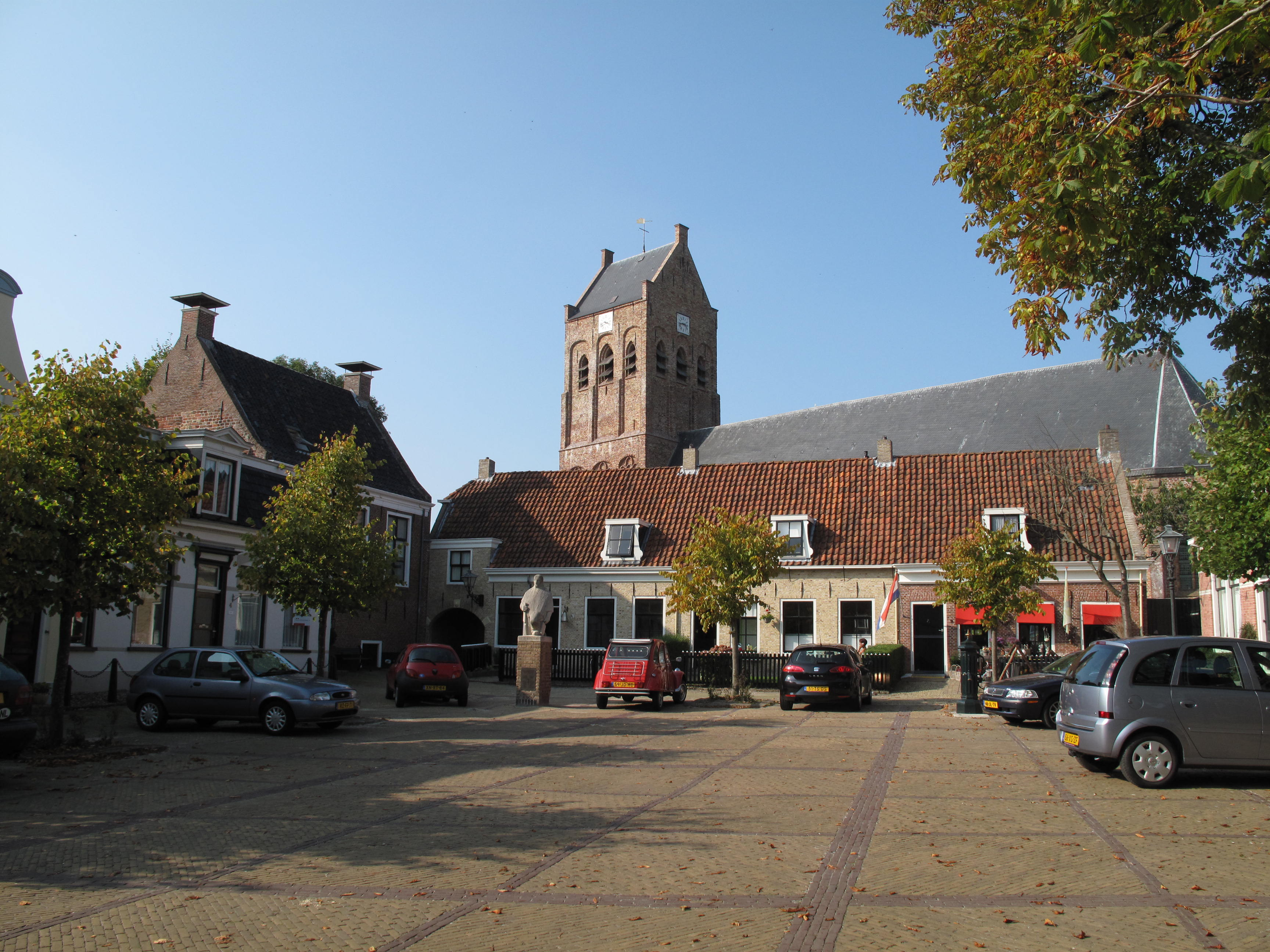
Ferwerd, Vrijhof and church

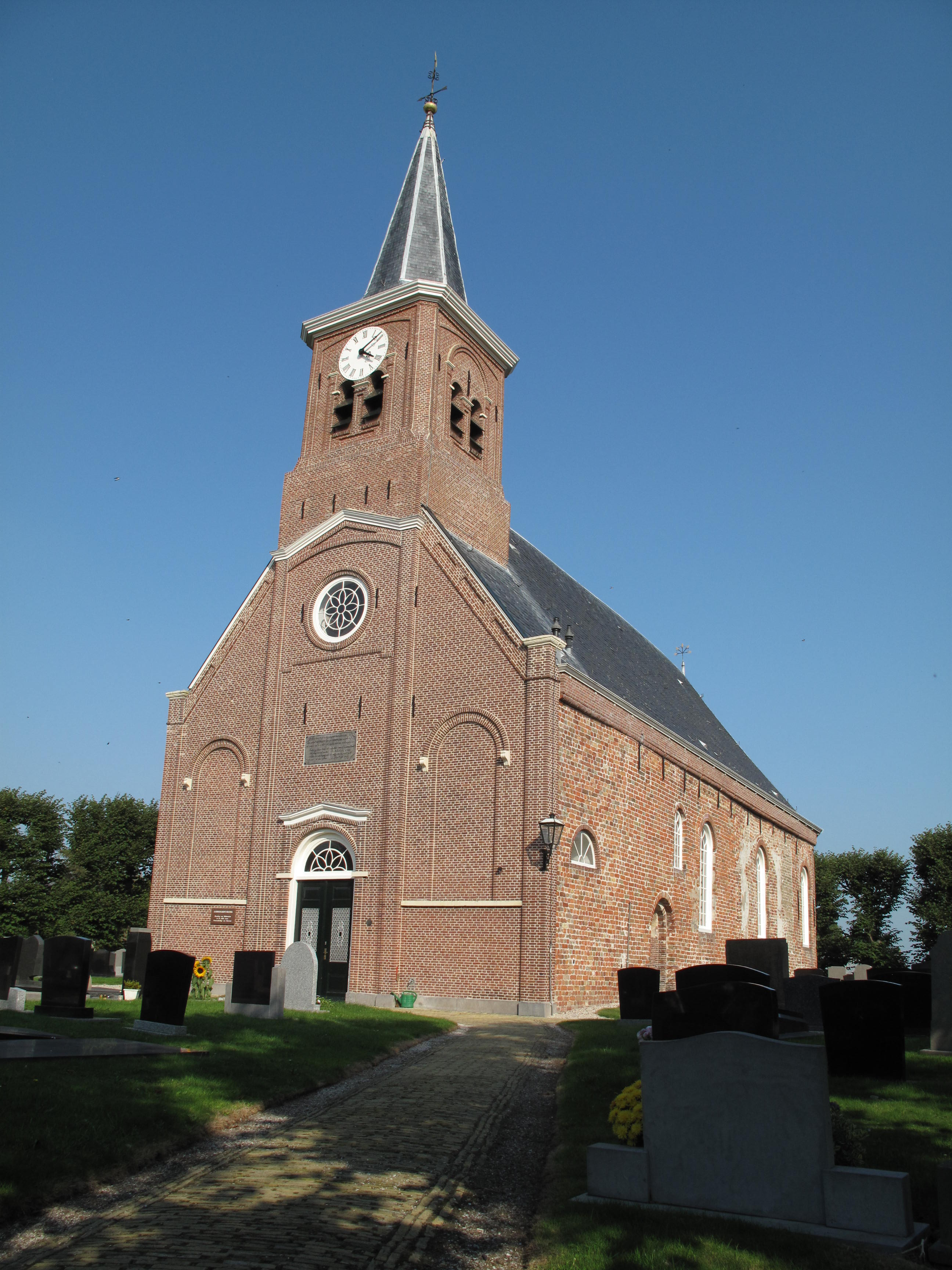
Marrum, church

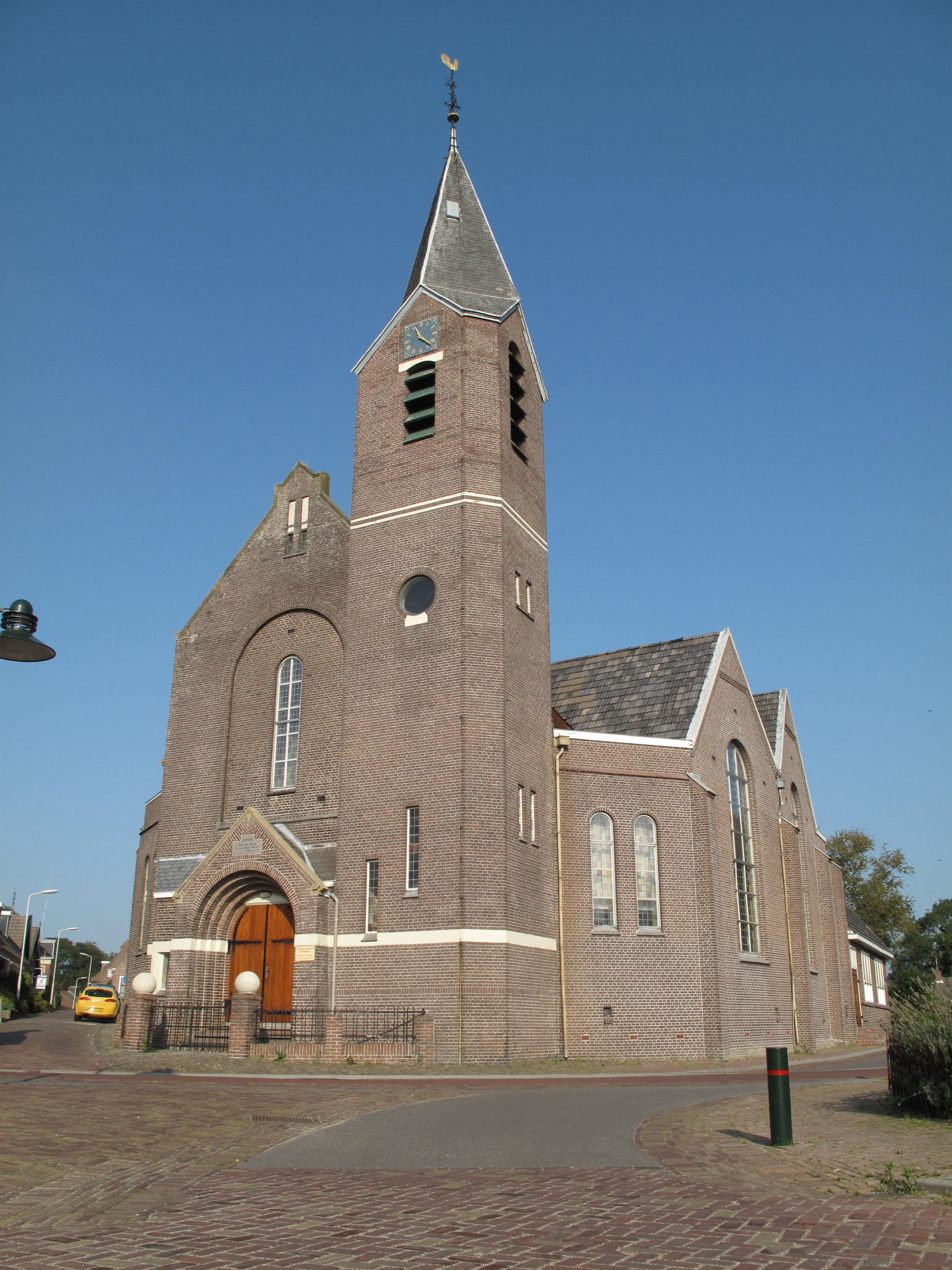
Hallum, church
