= Burdaard =

Burdaard Birdaard
- Village
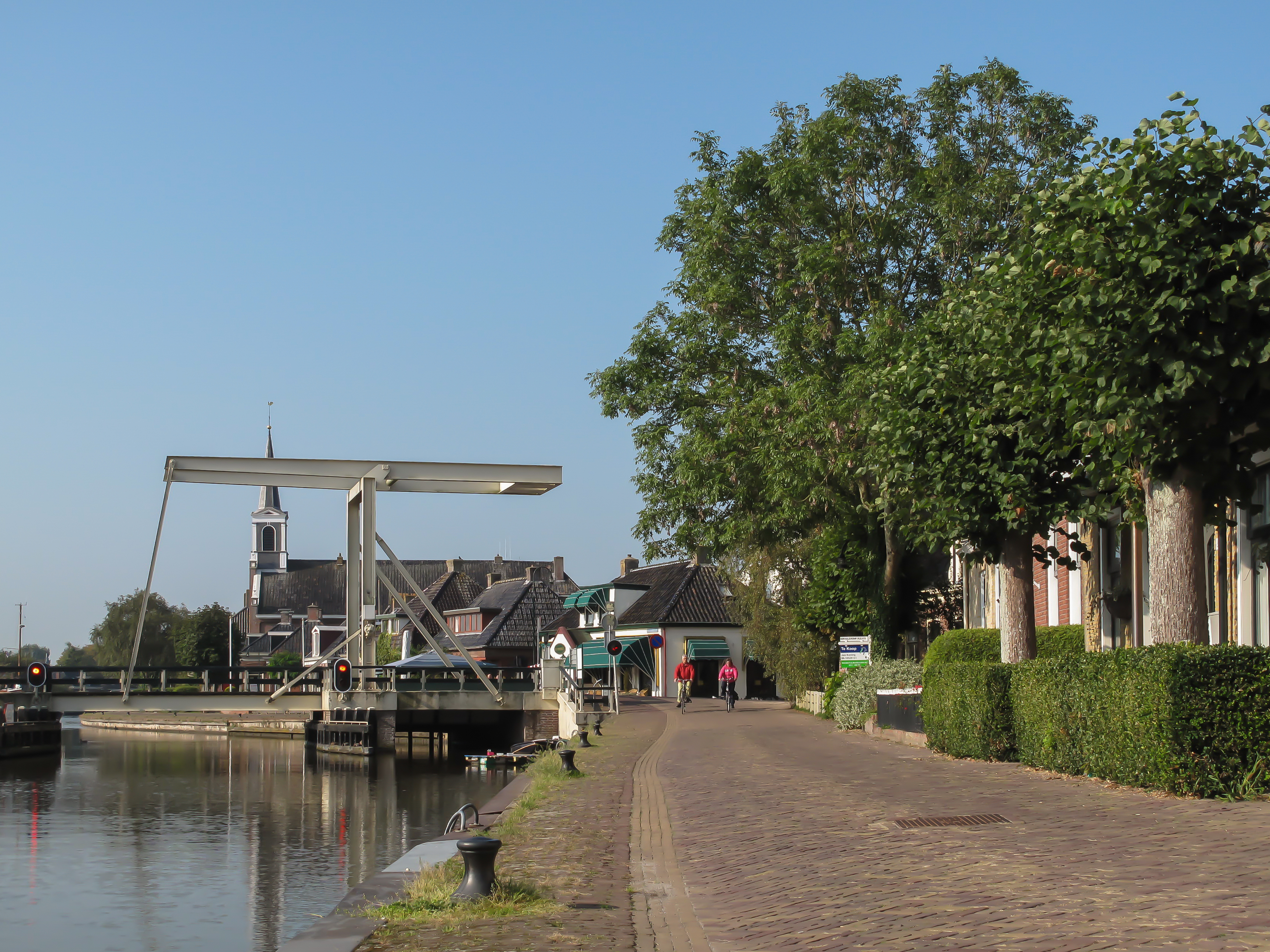

- Flag

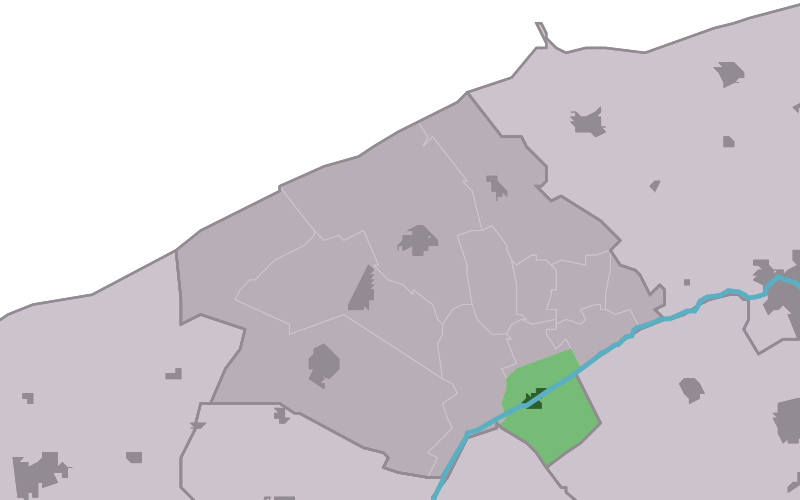
- Location in the former Ferwerderadiel municipality

- Location in the Netherlands Burdaard (Netherlands)
- Country: Netherlands
- Province: Friesland
- Municipality: Noardeast-Fryslân

Population (2017)
  - Total: 1,173
- Time zone: UTC+1 (CET)
  - Summer (DST): UTC+2 (CEST)
- Postal code: 9111
- Telephone area: 0519
- Website: Official

Burdaard is a village in Noardeast-Fryslân in the province of Friesland, the Netherlands. It had a population of around 1,173 in January 2017. Before 2019, the village was part of the Ferwerderadiel municipality.

It is situated south of Jislum, southeast of Wânswert, and northwest of Aldtsjerk. The Dokkumer Ee canal, connecting Dokkum and Leeuwarden, runs straight through the village centre.

Annually, more than ten thousand ships and boats pass through Burdaard. The village is one of the few settlements which is visited twice by ice skaters in the Elfstedentocht.

== Name ==
Since 1999, the official name of the village is Burdaard, reflecting the Frisian pronunciation. The Dutch name is Birdaard, a standardized spelling dating back to Napoleonic times.

Before standardization, many different spellings were in use throughout the ages. Small variations on the modern name are found in historical maps and texts: the final consonant was often a 't' or 'dt', and 'aa' was often spelled as 'ae'. Before 1700, greater variation in spelling occurred.

The village appears on a 1605 map made by Abraham Ortelius as 'Birdawert'. Until around 1620 this spelling was reused by other mapmakers and spelled as 'Birdewert' or 'Birdauwert'. After 1620, several maps were made where the name is spelled as 'Biddaert'. In 1665, the Schotanus Atlas spells the name again as 'Birdauwert'. Subsequent editions also used this name. In 1718, François Halma first used the spelling 'Birdaard' in an edited version of the Schotanus maps, a spelling that persists until today.

Alongside the spelling variations already mentioned, historical texts also use several other spellings. The oldest mention of the village occurs in a document dating back to 945 from the Princely Abbey of Fulda, where it's called Breitenfurt. In late medieval times, spellings such as Berdawerd, Birdauwert and Birdawerth were used, among many other variant spellings. Even in early modern times, the range of spellings used was considerable, including Berdaerdt, Birdavert and Bierdauwert.

== History ==
=== Dokkumer Ee and early history ===
Burdaard is a terp village, consisting of two historic cores. The oldest part of the village is centred around a terp that was built several centuries BCE.

Burdaard is situated on the Dokkumer Ee, the canal connecting the cities of Leeuwarden and Dokkum. This canal played an important role in the history of the village.

It is not known precisely in what year(s) the canal was constructed, though it already appears on the very first reliable maps of Friesland, which date back to the 1500s. Before the canal was constructed, there were two small naturally formed rivers, now called the Zuider Ee, ending in the sea at Leeuwarden; and the Noorder Ee, connecting Dokkum to the sea. At the time, both of these cities were still located on the coast and important local sea harbors. At some point in the Middle Ages, the Middelzee, the bay connecting Leeuwarden to the wider ocean, silted up completely, and as a result its harbor became unusable. The risk of the harbor of Dokkum silting up was much smaller, so a direct waterway connection between the two cities was created: the two small rivers were connected by digging a canal between Tergracht and Burdaard. It is likely that this happened in the 13th century. The local Cistercian monastery, the Klaarkamp Abbey, might have played a role in aiding this project, as part of a wider mission to develop remote, poorly accessible regions–which seems to have included northern Friesland.

The Dokkumer Ee itself also started silting up after a while, to the point that trade was being obstructed and boats had to divert to another waterway. In 1506, the canal was completely dredged, in order to deepen and widen the waterway so boats could again sail through. Again, Klaarkamp Abbey carried out some of the work associated with the dredging. In 1646/1647, another improvement was made to the canal: a parallel road was constructed on the northern side of the canal. This road was used by horses pulling trekschuiten, a style of sail- and horse-drawn boat used for passenger traffic in the Netherlands at the time. Several toll houses were constructed alongside the road, including one in Burdaard. Along the Dokkumer Ee, the village expanded in a linear fashion from the original core centred around the village terp. In 1777, the canal was again deepened and widened, to be able to meet the demands of ever-increasing shipping traffic. Previously, the canal was much too shallow: at Burdaard, it was even possible to safely wade through the canal. The deepening of the canal made this impossible, so at the same time, a bridge was built in Burdaard.

=== Terpen ===
Historically, the inhabitants of Friesland, built mounds called terpen to provide safe ground during storm surges, high tides and sea or river flooding. Within a radius of two kilometres, there were six such terpen in and around Burdaard. Nowadays, only two of those are still (partially) visible in the landscape: the Dorpsterp (currently the location of a church, the Hervormde Kerk) and the Doniaterp along to the road to Wânswert. The Dorpsterp is a large terp that is part of the village itself, south of the Dokkumer Ee. In the 18th and 19th centuries there used to be five farmhouses and an older church on the terp, including a farmhouse called Groot-Wytsma, which was the state (family home) of the influential Wytsma family, who owned many properties in and around Burdaard. In the late 19th and early 20th centuries, most of the terp was destroyed, to use the fertile soil it contained to fertilize farm fields. In 1931, Groot-Wytsma was demolished. In 1945, the inhabitants of Burdaard celebrated the liberation of the Netherlands on the empty, excavated plots of the Dorpsterp.

The Doniaterp acquired its name sometime long before the 18th century. Historically, there were three farmhouses on the terp. The northern half of the terp was most likely demolished between 1875 and 1915. It is unknown when the southern half was demolished, but probably earlier than the northern half, because the transportation of soil from there was considerably easier.

Alongside the two existent major terpen, there were four minor terpen that are now (almost) completely gone or hard to recognize as a terp nowadays. The Terp Baerd was situated north of the village, just south of the Iedyk road. It was demolished completely in the second half of the 19th century, leaving a small wetland area that is at a lower elevation than the surrounding farmland. Nowadays it is only recognizable in satellite pictures and in the jagged borders of the surrounding fields. The Terp van Kolkhuizen suffered the same fate, and is even harder to recognize nowadays. Another terp, the Terp met de Reamskûtel, is mostly intact, but is not very recognizable, due to its low height. It has just one farmhouse. During construction work in 1998, the site was excavated, and small shells in the layers of soil below the oldest part of the mound were dated to approximately 500 BC, meaning the Terp van Kolkhuizen (and almost certainly other mounds in the surrounding region as well) has been inhabited since at least that time period. The fourth minor terp, the Wierde van Hollebrantsje, is nowadays only visible as a slight difference in elevation.

=== Recent history ===
In 1897, the cooperative dairy factory Concordia was founded by dairy farmers from Burdaard. The foundation of the factory was part of a nationwide movement: until the 1880s, the Netherlands was the largest exporter of butter to England. However, in the following years, the overall quality of Dutch butter fell due to an increase in additives such as margarine and fats. Hence, Denmark replaced the Netherlands as England's biggest butter export partner, exporting five times as much butter as the Netherlands in 1890. The Dutch government and agricultural organizations intervened: they promoted the rapid foundation of dairy factories throughout the Netherlands, as a measure to improve the quality of butter. In the 1890s, local dairy farmers in Ferwerderadiel were called upon to open cooperative dairy factories: the first factory was founded in Marrum, in 1891; quickly followed by a factory in Bartlehiem in 1893, and finally several years the Concordia factory in Burdaard. The Concordia factory operated until 1965. In that year, the factory's owners decided to join neighboring cooperatives in Leeuwarden and Marrum. The buildings that housed the factory were demolished in 1988 and 1993, and houses were built on the empty plot.

In 1915, the cooperative gristmill De Eendracht was founded. After the foundation of the dairy factory Concordia, the demand for higher quality cattle feed increased. Burdaard's farmers were aware of the benefits of high quality cattle feed: increased milk production with a higher fat content. Local mills couldn't keep up with the demand, so in October 1915, a cooperative of farmers in Burdaard submitted an application for a permit for the foundation of a gristmill, which was granted. Construction was started, and the mill was opened in September 1916. The grain was supplied by ship on the Dokkumer Ee from other regions in Friesland, and later on even from abroad, because there were no grainfields near the village. Around 1920, the mill also started producing fertilizer. The mill's products were sold throughout the entirety of northern Friesland. During the last years of its existence, more than 10,000 tons of feed, fertilizer, and fuel were produced by the mill, accounting for a revenue of two million guilders. In 1966, the company was bought by the CAF company in Leeuwarden, and eventually closed as a result of the increasing centralization of production. Around 1990, the building fell into disrepair for a while, but it was completely renovated and it is now used as the offices of an architectural firm.

Initially, the village was administratively divided over two municipalities: the southern half was part of the grietenij Dantumadiel, and the northern half was part of Ferwerderadiel. The northern half used to be known under the administrative name Wanswerd aan de Streek, where many retired farmers from the neighboring village of Wânswert lived. From 1973 onwards, the two "villages" (each of which essentially represented one half of the same core built-up area) were administratively combined and the entire area was henceforth called Burdaard. However, the village was still split between two municipalities–a situation that ended in 1984, when municipal reorganization was introduced and the entire village became part of Ferwerderadiel.

In 1972, the mill De Zwaluw was struck by lightning and burnt down. Restoration by Fabrikaat Buurma of Oudeschans, Groningen was started in 1984 and completed in 1987.

From the 1990s onwards, the village expanded considerably, when the new neighborhood of Groot-Bornemeer was built.

In August 2018, Dutch Olympic swimmer Maarten van der Weijden, who survived cancer, raised funds for cancer research by swimming the route of the Elfstedentocht. Just after passing Burdaard, he had to quit due to medical concerns. Despite having to quit the fundraiser prematurely, he raised more than 2,500,000 euros–much more than the initial goal of 11,000 euros. Residents of Burdaard desired to commemorate his fundraiser, and in June 2019, a statue of Maarten van der Weijden, designed by a local artist, was revealed in the harbor of Burdaard.

In 2019, the village became part of the municipality of Noardeast-Fryslân.

== Culture and heritage ==
The village centre falls under the Burdaard conservation area, in recognition of the fact that a large part of the village consists of historical buildings. There are several listed national heritage sites (rijksmonumenten) in the village, including a terp predating Roman times.

The village contains the Ruurd Wiersma Hùs, a museum dedicated to the naïve art of local resident Ruurd Wiersma (1904–1980). The museum is situated in the home that Wiersma lived in until his death. Its collection includes paintings and everyday objects that have been decorated by the painter. The walls of the former living room are adorned by wall paintings depicting the four seasons.

=== Churches ===
There are two churches in the village. The oldest church is the Hervormde Kerk, built in 1851. This aisleless church with a three-sided apse was built to replace a medieval church that had a gable roof tower. The new church has windows with pointed arches and its facade is defined by a tower with a spire. The tower houses a bell cast by Jacob Noteman in 1638. The corresponding clergy house was built at the same time as the church.

The other church is the Gereformeerde Kerk. This is also an aisleless church, built in 1893 in an eclectic architectural style. Its facade is defined by a wooden tower.

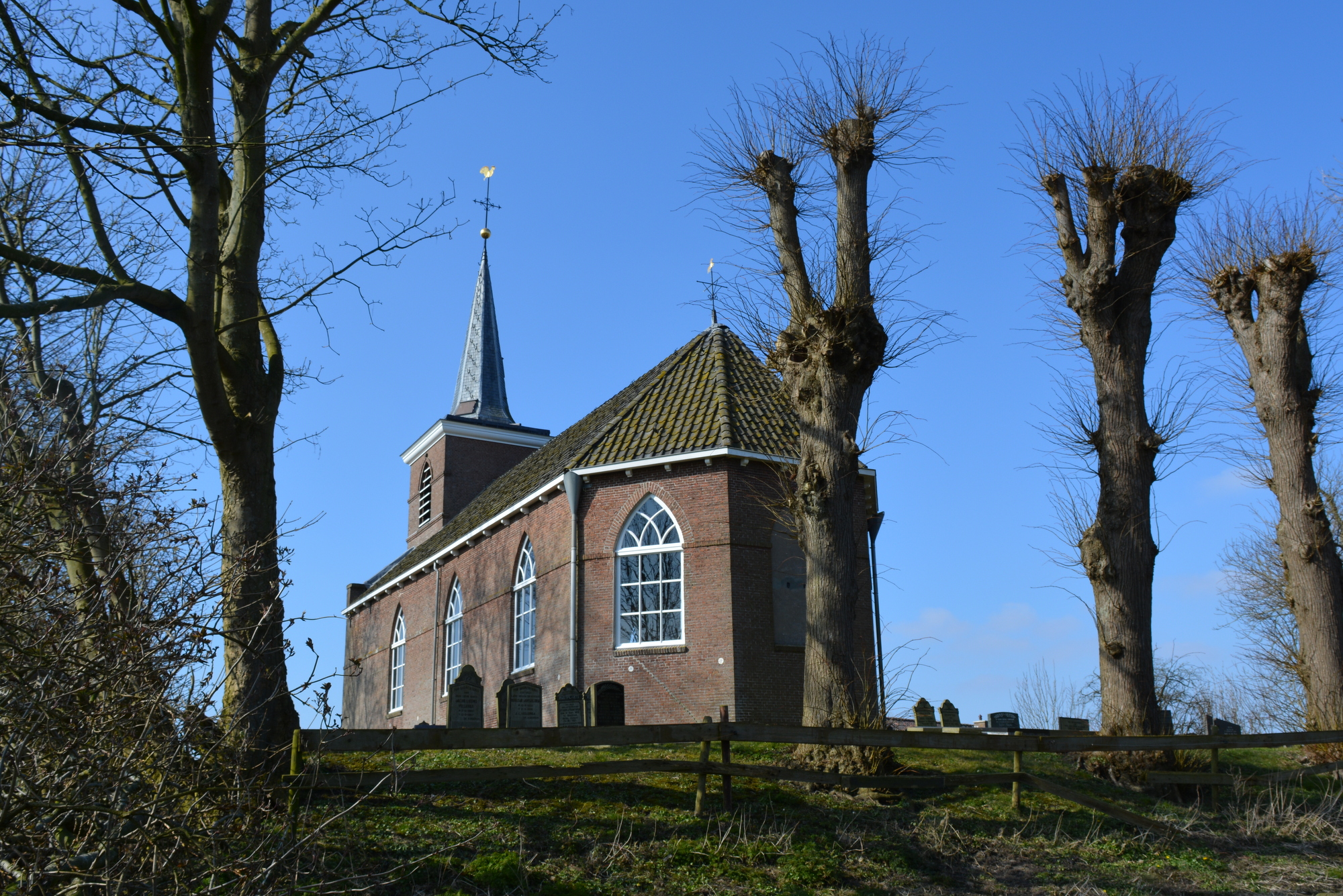
Hervormde Kerk

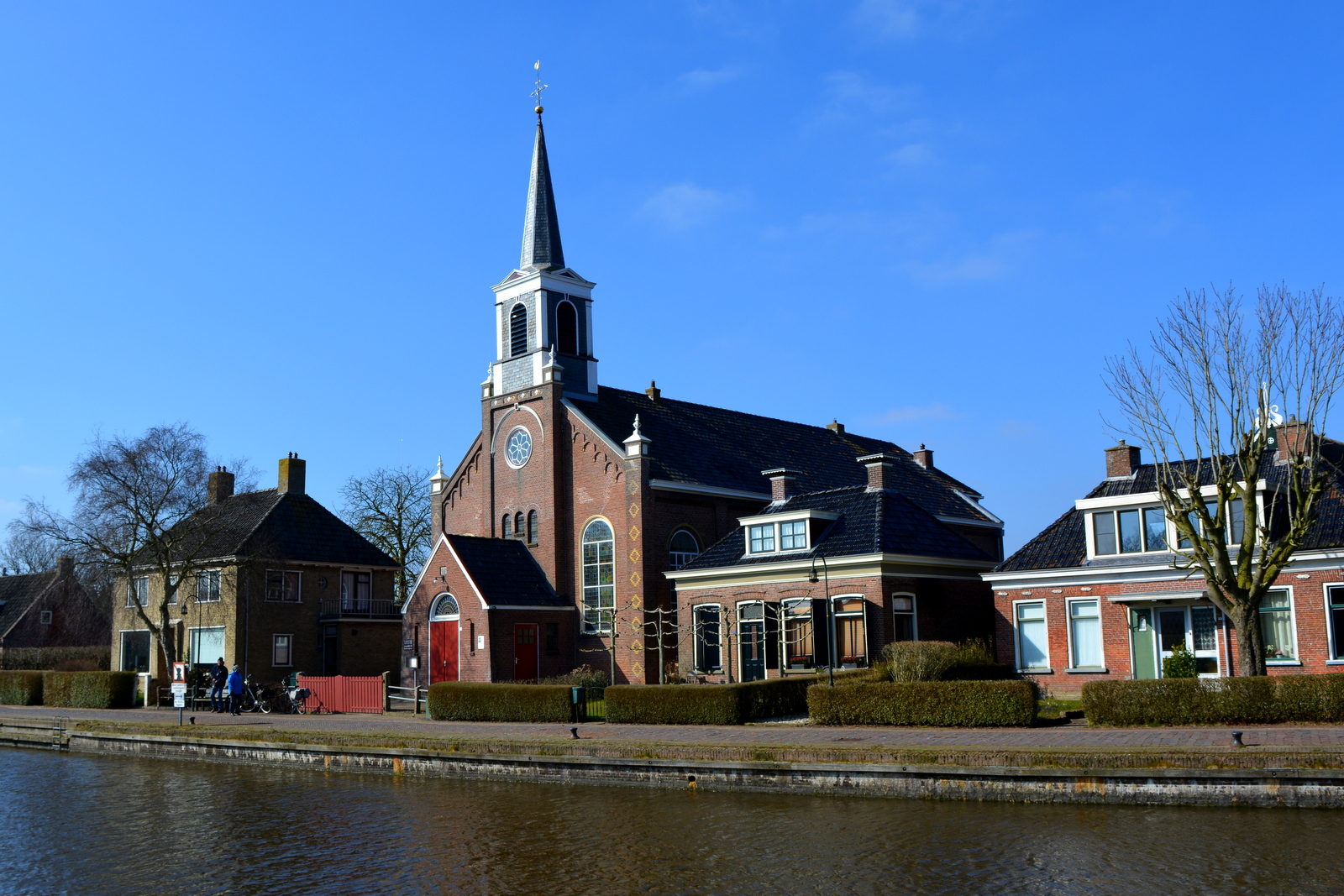
Gereformeerde Kerk

=== Windmills ===
There are two windmills in Burdaard, both of which are national heritage sites. De Olifant is a drainage mill dating from 1867 (originally built in 1856 in Groningen, and then moved to its current location) which has been restored to working order. De Zwaluw is a corn, pearl barley and sawmill which is working commercially. De Zwaluw was built in 1875 to replace an earlier mill from 1826 that burnt down. De Zwaluw itself also burnt down in 1972, and was rebuilt 1984–1987.

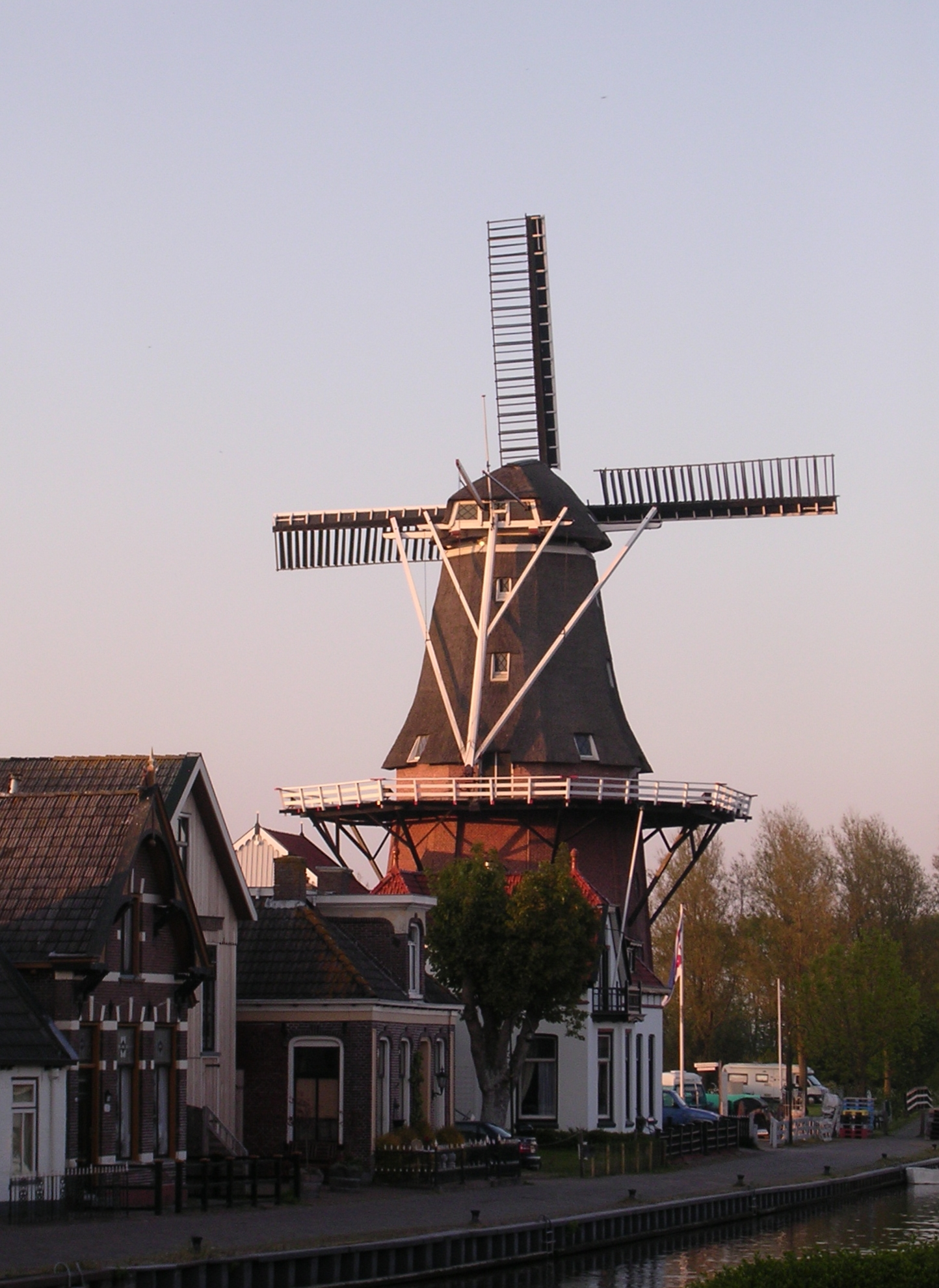
De Zwaluw (the Swallow)

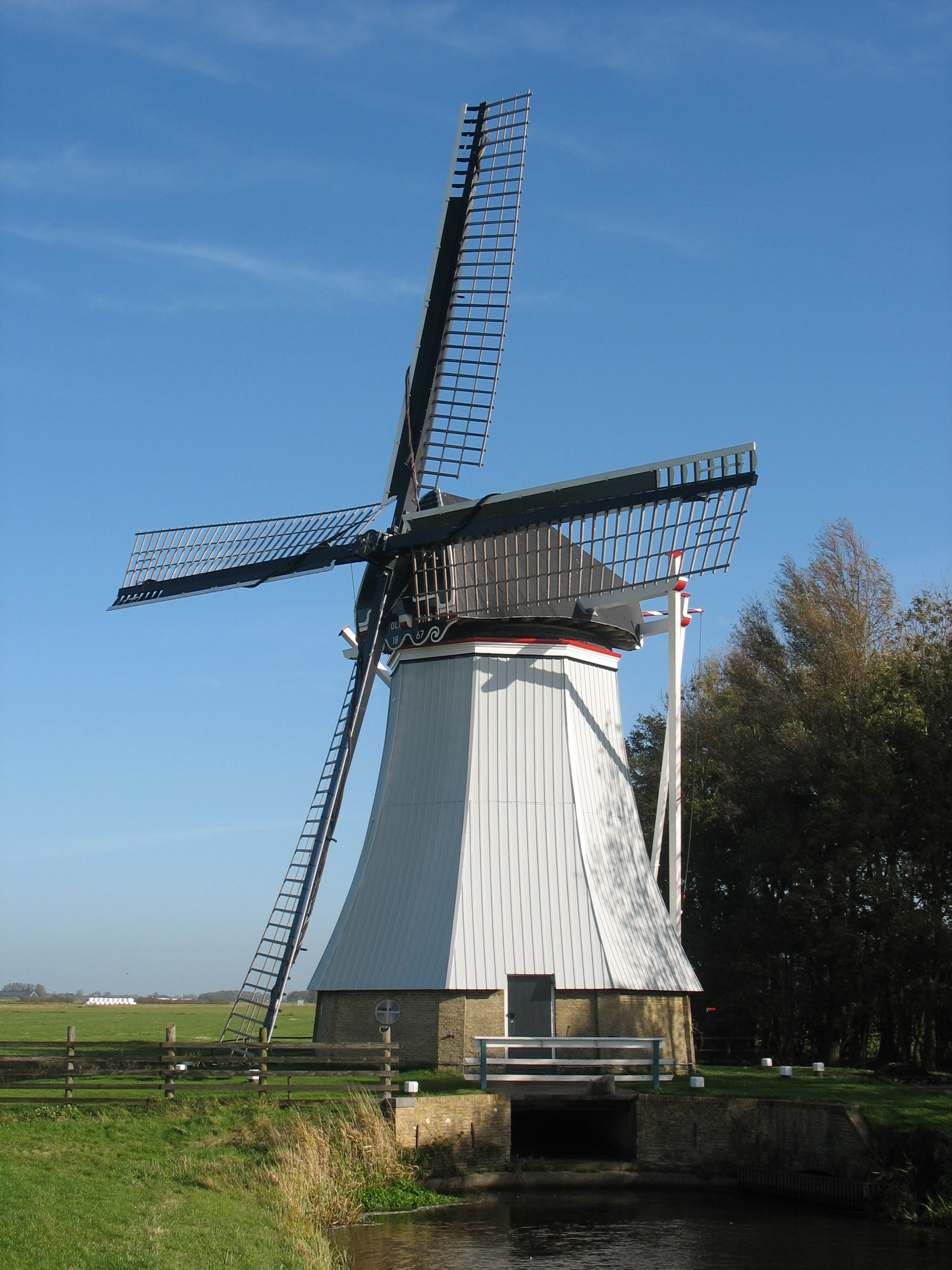
De Olifant (the Elephant)

== Sources ==
- Kingma, Auke (2007). Drie Eeuwen Burdaard (in Dutch). Stichting Ald Burdaard. ISBN 9789090222486.
