= Ferwert =

Ferwert Ferwerd
- Village
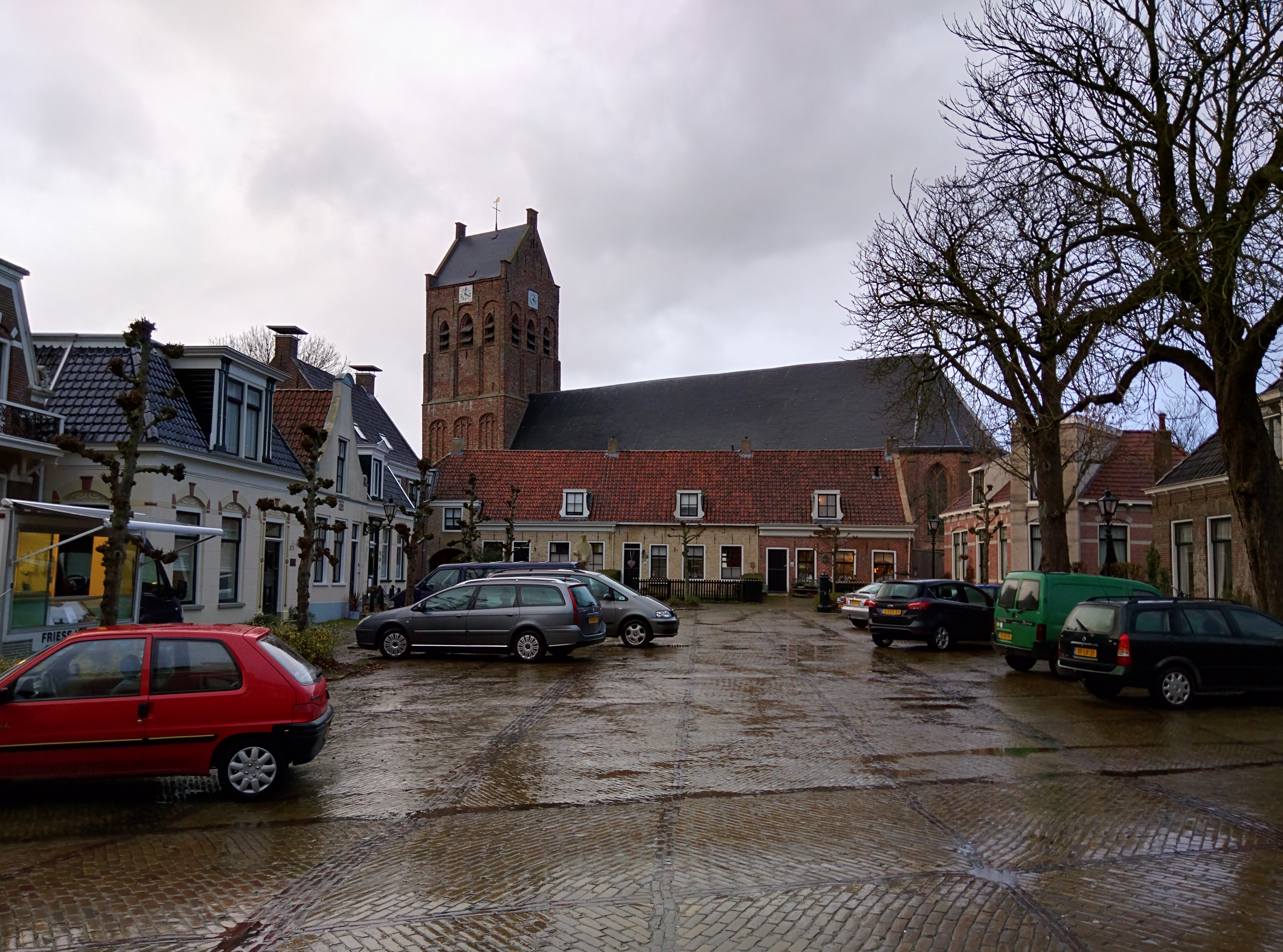
- St Martin's church

- Flag Seal

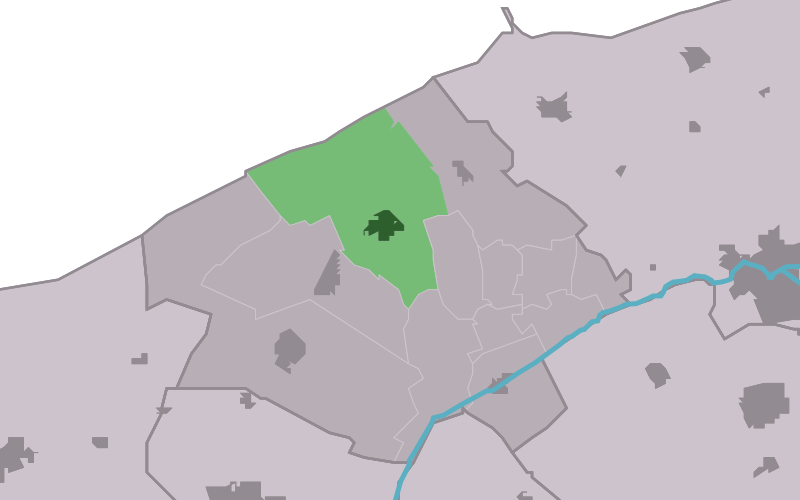
- Location in the former Ferwerderadiel municipality

- Location in the Netherlands Ferwert (Netherlands)
- Country: Netherlands
- Province: Friesland
- Municipality: Noardeast-Fryslân

Area
  - Total: 18.48 km^{2} (7.14 sq mi)
- Elevation: 1.3 m (4.3 ft)

Population (2021)
  - Total: 1,780
  - Density: 96.3/km^{2} (249/sq mi)
- Time zone: UTC+1 (CET)
  - Summer (DST): UTC+2 (CEST)
- Postal code: 9172
- Dialing code: 0518

Ferwert (Dutch: Ferwerd) is a village in Noardeast-Fryslân in the province of Friesland, the Netherlands. It had a population of around 1787 in January 2017. Before 2019, the village was part of the Ferwerderadiel municipality.

== History ==
The village was first mentioned between 819 and c. 825 as "in Fatruwerde". The etymology is unclear. Ferwert is a terp village with a radial structure which developed several centuries Before Christ. In the 11th or 12th century a dike was built leading to Marrum and Blije. The area to the south of the terp was property of the church and became a square known as Vrijhof (free court). Ferwert developed into the capital of the grietenij (predecessor of the municipality) Ferwerderadiel.

The earliest church probably dated from the 9th century. The tower of the Dutch Reformed church was built in the 15th century, and the church was constructed shortly after and contains elements of its medieval predecessor. The clergy house was built in the 15th century, and served as clergy house from 1580 until 1723. In 1840, it became the town hall.

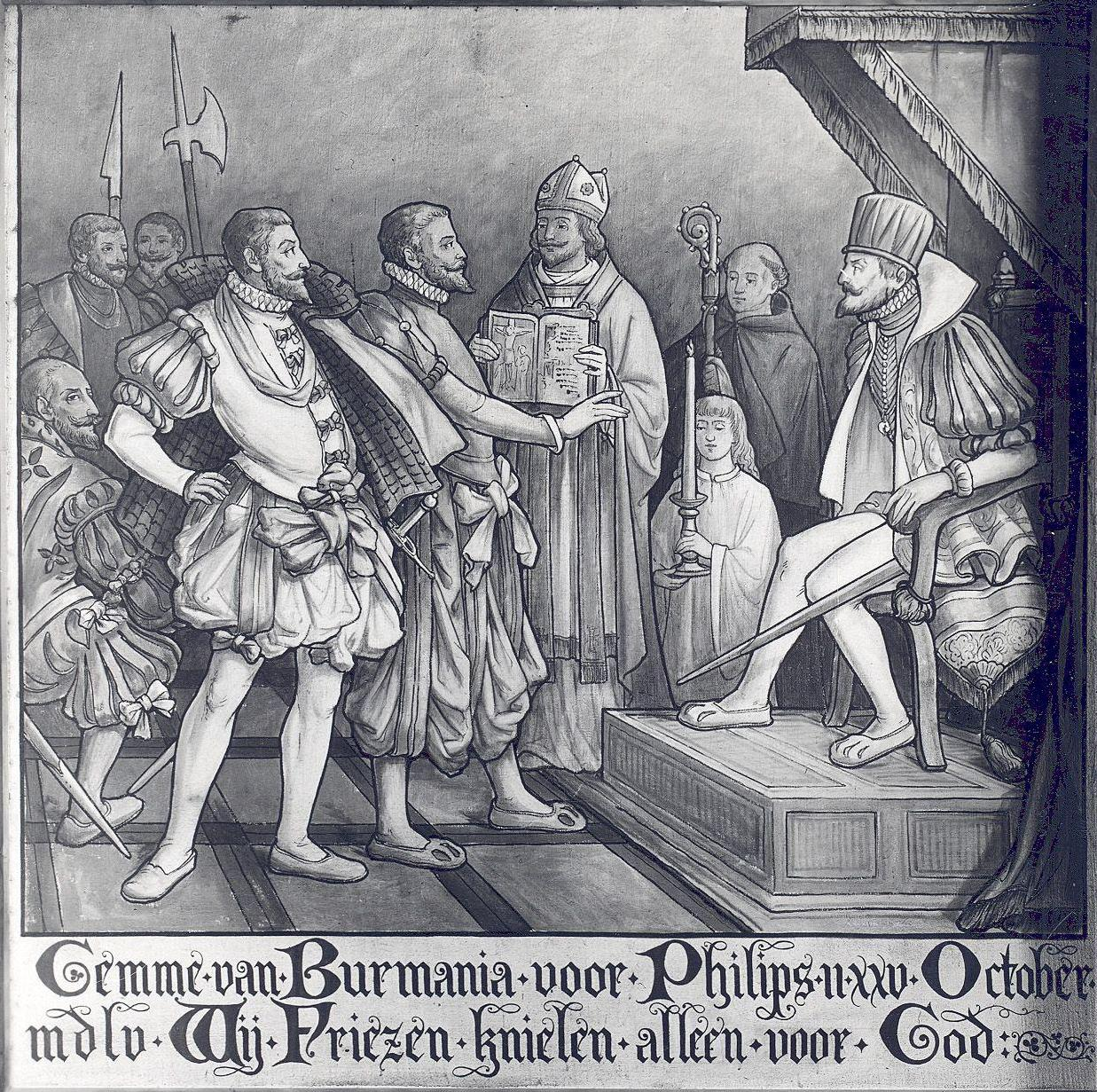
Gemme van Burmania in front of King Philip II

The stins Herjuwsma State was first mentioned around 1500. It was owned by Gemme Herjuwsma who was decapitated in 1512 in Leeuwarden for conspiring with Edzard I, Count of East Frisia, and his estate was seized by troops of the Duke of Burgundy. Gemme van Burmania owned the estate in the mid-16th century. In 1555, he represented Friesland during the inauguration of Philip II of Spain and refused to kneel to the king, saying "Wy Friezen knibbelje allinne foar God" (We Frisian only kneel for God) which could be considered the start of the Dutch Revolt. Van Burmania was subsequently banned and had to flee to the Cologne. The estate was abandoned in 1805, and was demolished in 1816.

In 1840, Ferwert was home to 1,463 people. A part of the terp was excavated around 1900. In 2019, Ferwerderadiel was merged into Noardeast-Fryslân.

== Notable people ==
- Pieter Boeles (1795–1875), minister and linguist
- Gemme van Burmania (1523–1602), nobleman and resistance fighter
- Eeltsje Boates Folkertsma (1893–1968), writer and translator

== Gallery ==
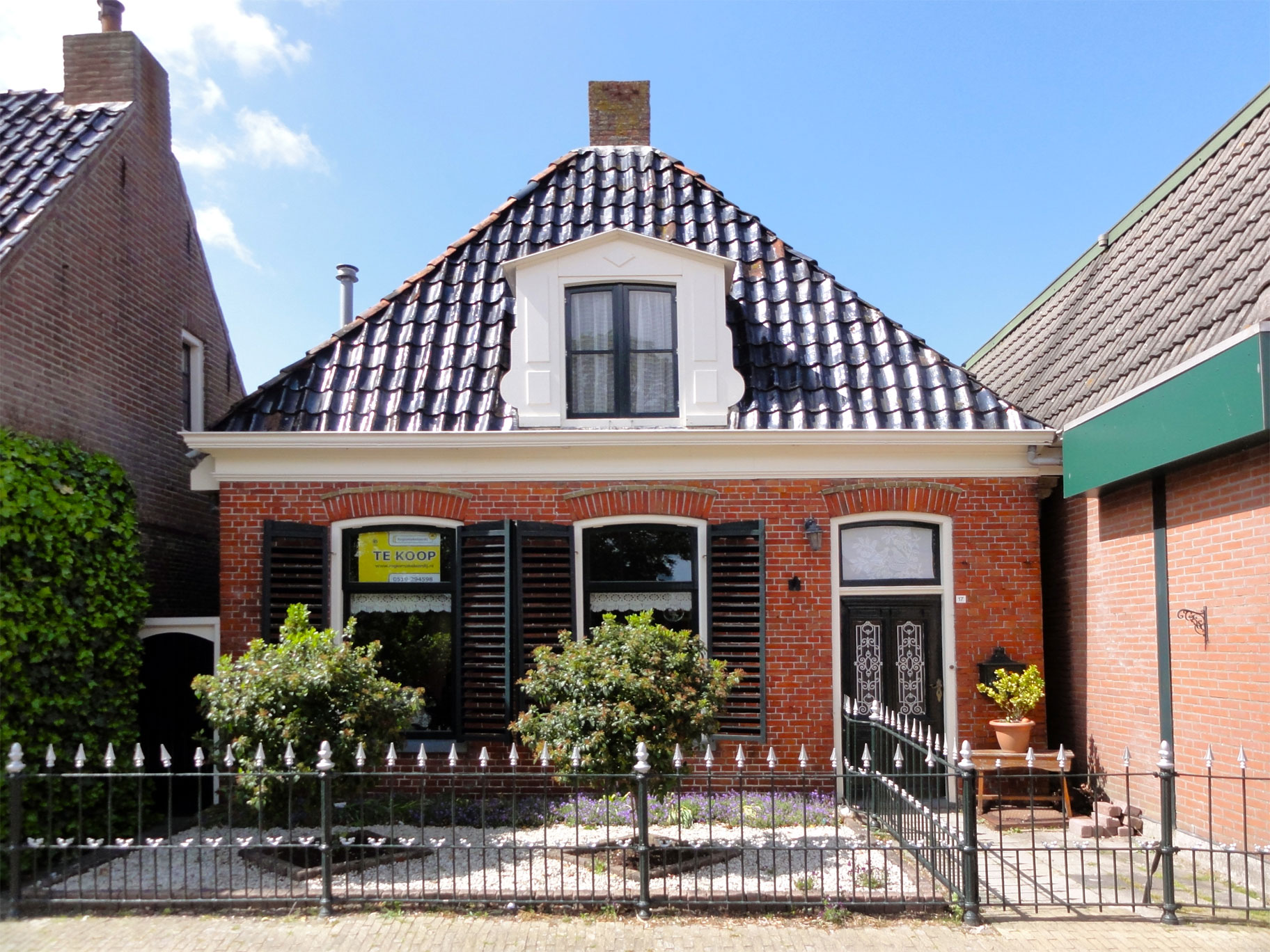
House in Ferwert

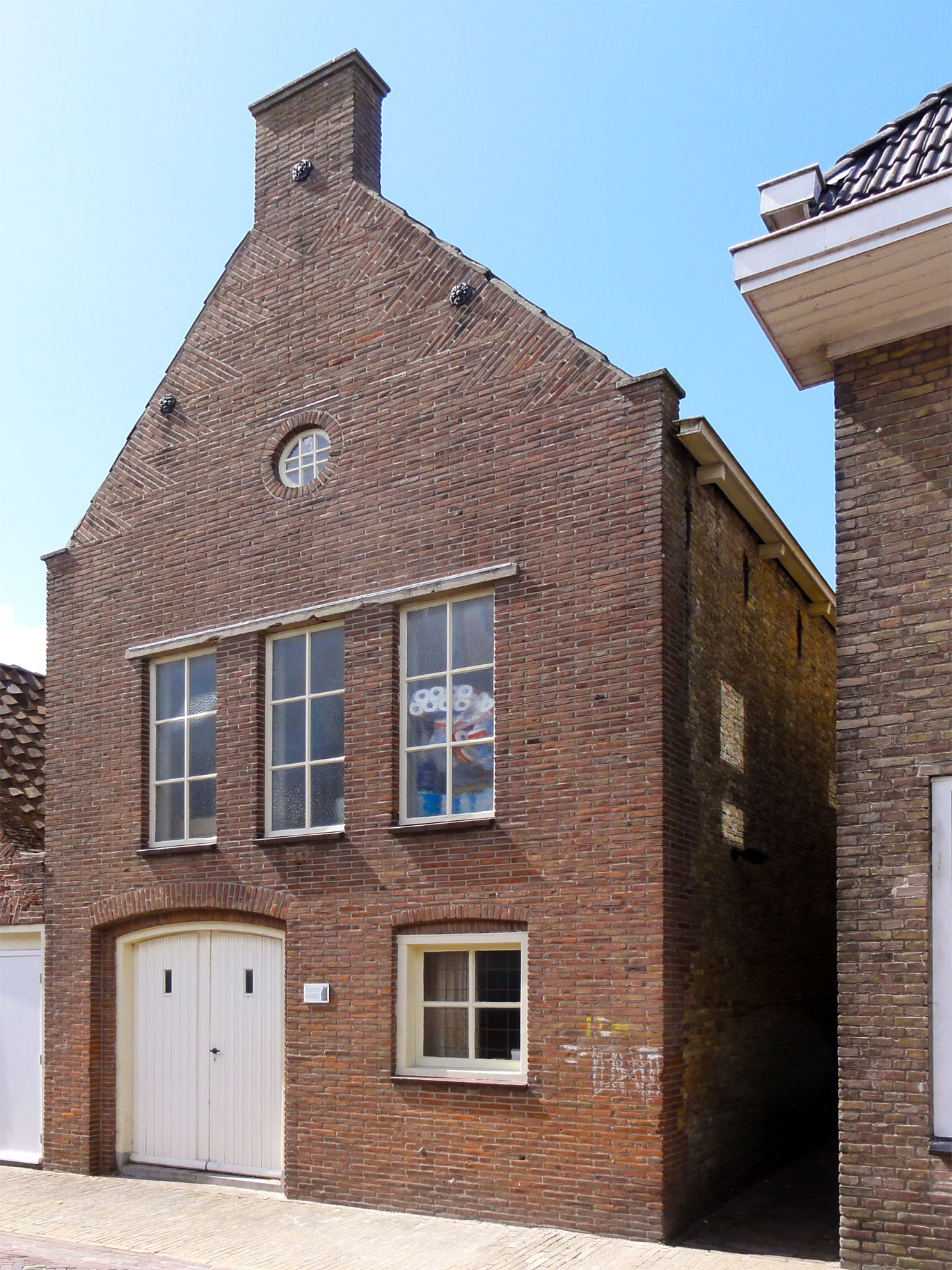
House in Ferwert

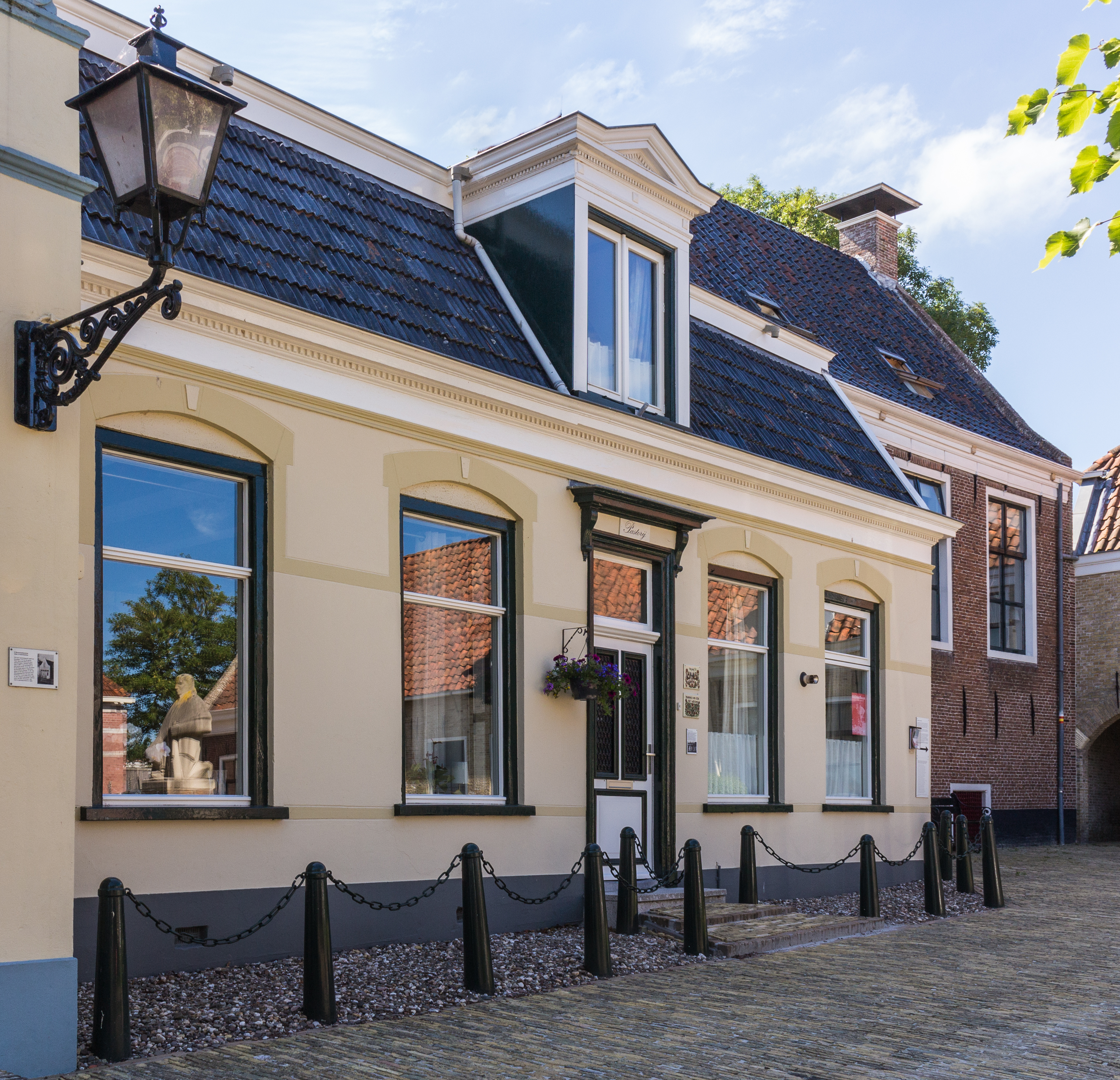
Former clergy house

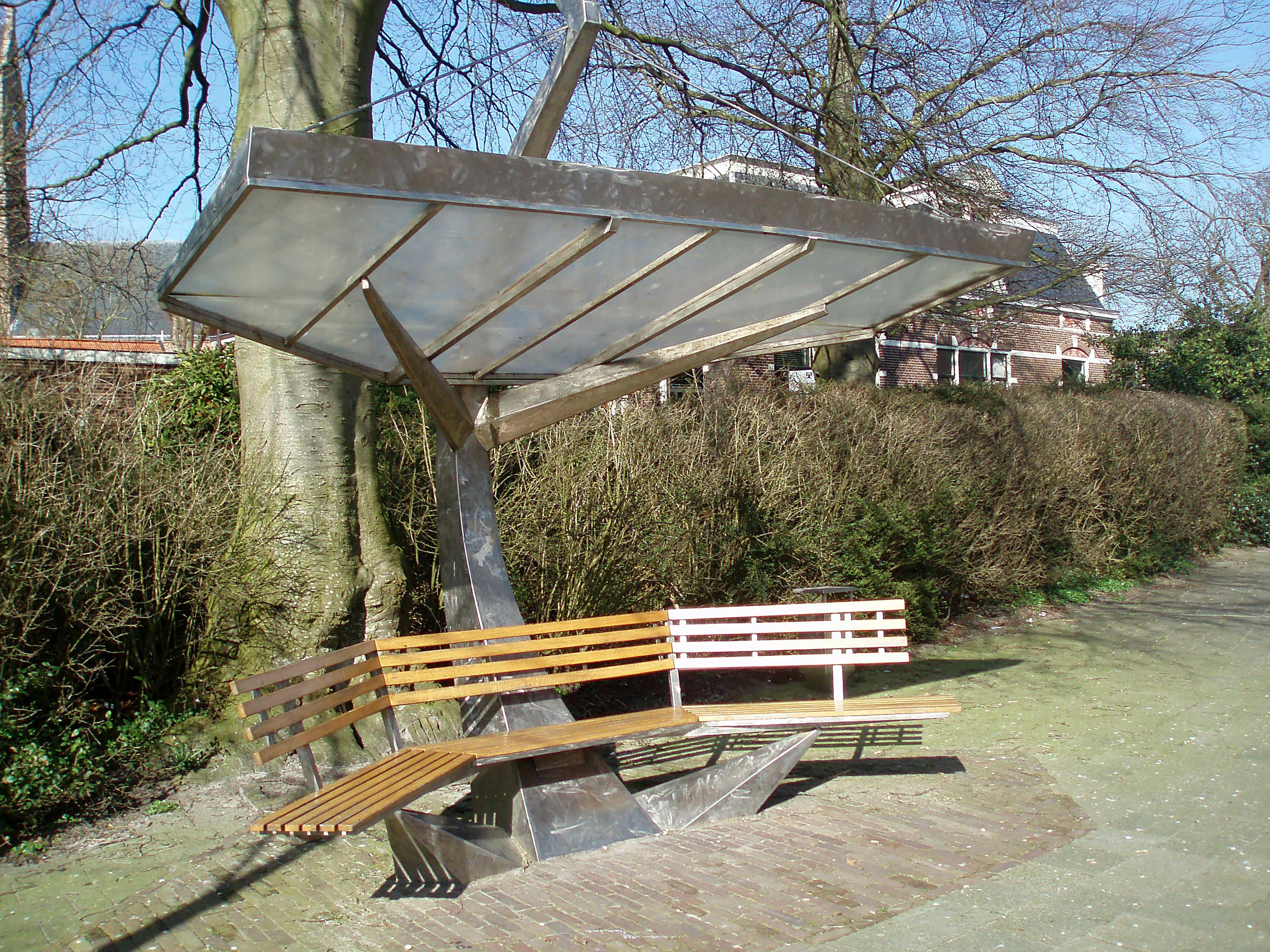
Bus stop and liar's bench
