= De Olifant, Burdaard =

Smock mill in the Netherlands

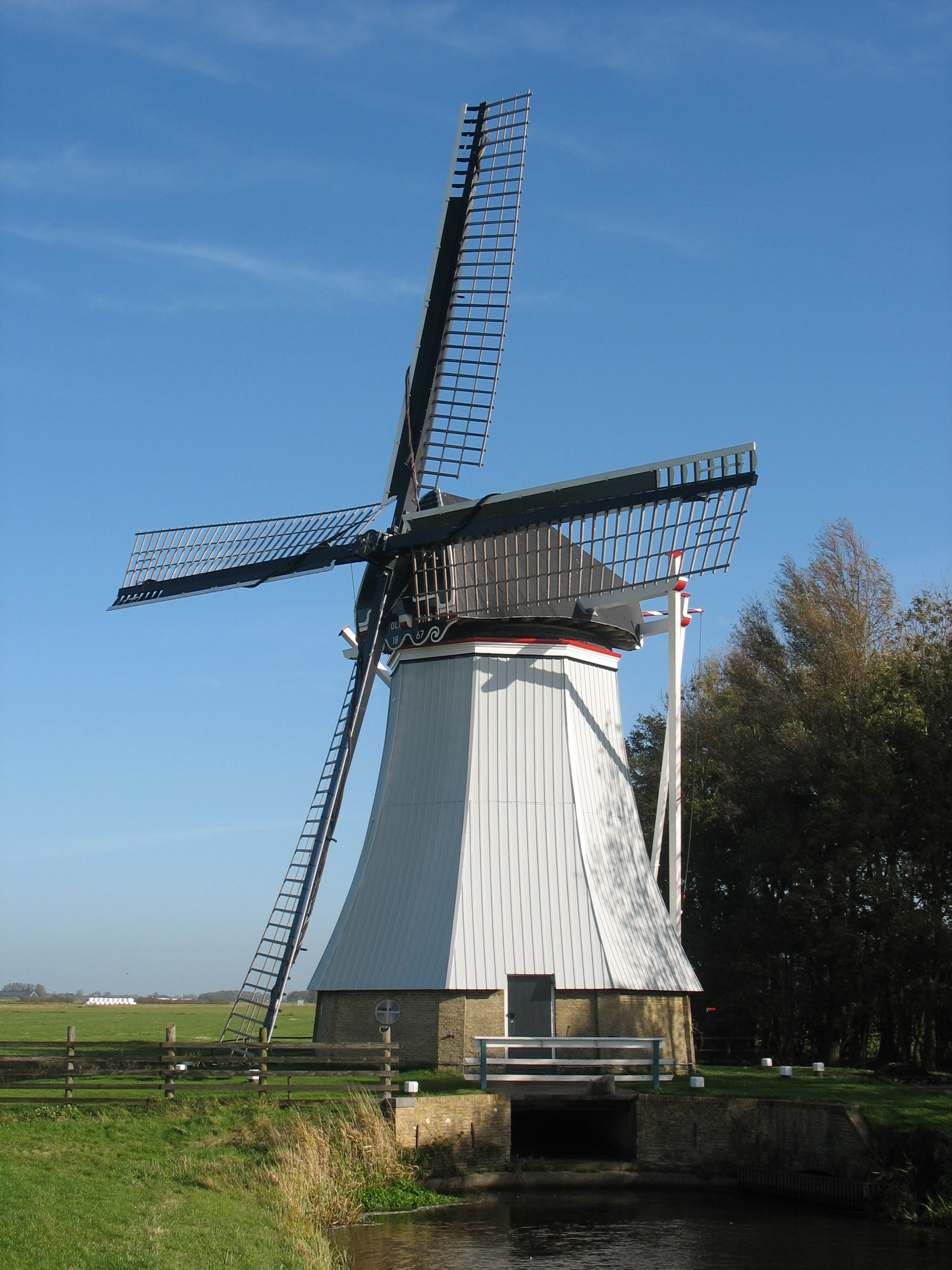
- De Olifant, October 2008

Origin
- Mill name: De Olifant
- Mill location: Wiereweg 20, 9112 GS Burdaard
- Coordinates: 53°16′49″N 5°52′38″E
- Operator(s): Stichting De Fryske Mole
- Year built: 1867

Information
- Purpose: Drainage mill
- Type: Smock mill
- Storeys: Two-storey smock
- Base storeys: Single-storey base
- Smock sides: Eight sides
- No. of sails: Four sails
- Type of sails: Common sails
- Windshaft: Cast iron
- Winding: Tailpole and winch
- Type of pump: Archimedes' screw

De Olifant (Dutch pronunciation: [də ˈʔoːlifɑnt]; English: The Elephant) is a smock mill in Burdaard, Friesland, Netherlands which has been restored to working order. The mill is listed as a Rijksmonument, number 35673.

== History ==
De Olifant was originally built at Oostwold, Groningen in 1856 where it drained the Oosterwolderpolder. In 1867 it was moved to Burdaard where it drained the Olifantpolder. The cost of purchase and re-erection was ƒ2,000. The mill worked until 1970 when it was taken out of use. The mill was sold to Stichting De Fryske Mole on 20 June 1977. Restoration was carried out in 1978-79 and again in 1991.

== Description ==
De Olifant is a smock mill winded by a winch. There is no stage, the sails reaching almost to the ground. The mill has a single-storey brick base and a two-storey smock. The smock has vertical weatherboarding and the cap is thatched. The four Common sails have a span of 23.90 metres (78 ft 5 in) and are carried in a cast-iron windshaft which was made by Prins van Oranje of The Hague in 1877. The windshaft also carries the brake wheel, which has 65 cogs. This drives the wallower (37 cogs) at the top of the upright shaft. At the bottom of the upright shaft, the great spur wheel (71 cogs) drives three wooden shafts, each of which drives a wooden Archimedes' screw via another set of gears. Two of the Archimedes' screws drain the "Olifant polder", while the third pumps water into the polder.

The drive to the larger of the two Archimedes' screws that drain the polder is from a 38-cog gear wheel meshing with the great spur wheel. This drives a 35-cog gear wheel which drives the Archimedes' screw via a 46-cog gear wheel on the axle of the Archimedes' screw. This Archimedes' screw has an axle diameter of 440 millimetres (17 in) and is 1.61 metres (5 ft 3 in) diameter overall. It is inclined at an angle of 17½°. Each revolution of the screw lifts 1,528 litres (336 imp gal) of water.

The drive to the smaller of the two Archimedes' screws that drain the polder is from a 36 cog gear wheel meshing with the great spur wheel. This drives a 33-cog gear wheel which drives the Archimedes' screw via a 41-cog gear wheel on the axle of the Archimedes' screw. This Archimedes' screw has an axle diameter of 400 millimetres (16 in) and is 1.31 metres (4 ft 4 in) diameter overall. It is inclined at an angle of 121°. Each revolution of the screw lifts 649 litres (143 imp gal) of water.

The drive to the Archimedes' screw that pumps water into the polder is from a 38-cog gear wheel meshing with the great spur wheel. This drives a 25 stave gear wheel which drives a wallower (30 cogs). The wallower drives a gear wheel with 31 cogs. This drives a cast-iron gear wheel with 48 teeth. This drives the Archimedes' screw via a cast-iron gear wheel with 60 cogs on the axle of the Archimedes' screw. This Archimedes' screw has an axle diameter of 400 millimetres (16 in) and is 1.37 metres (4 ft 6 in) diameter overall. It is inclined at an angle of 16°. Each revolution of the screw lifts 777 litres (171 imp gal) of water.

== Public access ==
De Olifant is open to the public by appointment.
