= Reitsum =

- Village
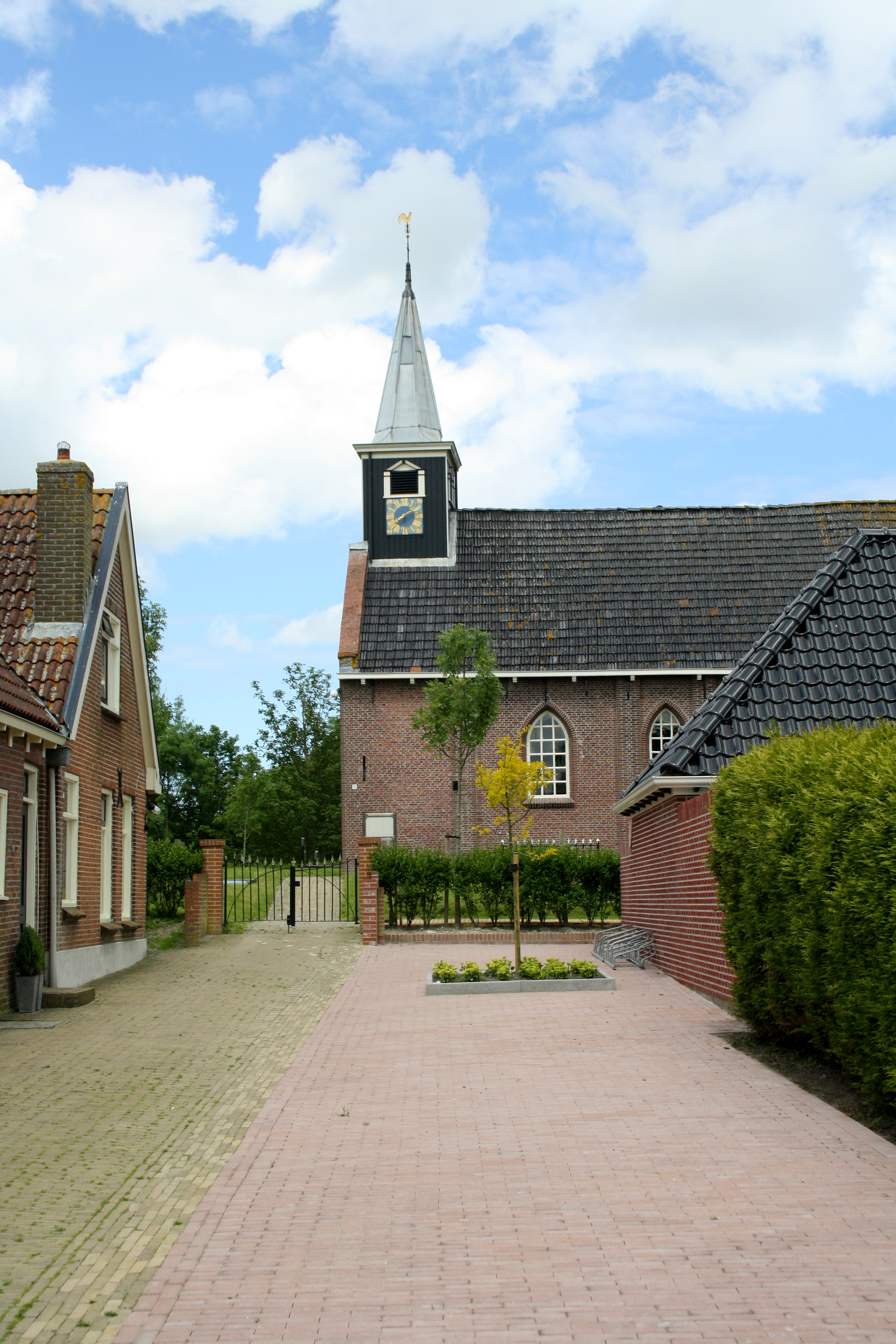
- Reitsum church

- Flag

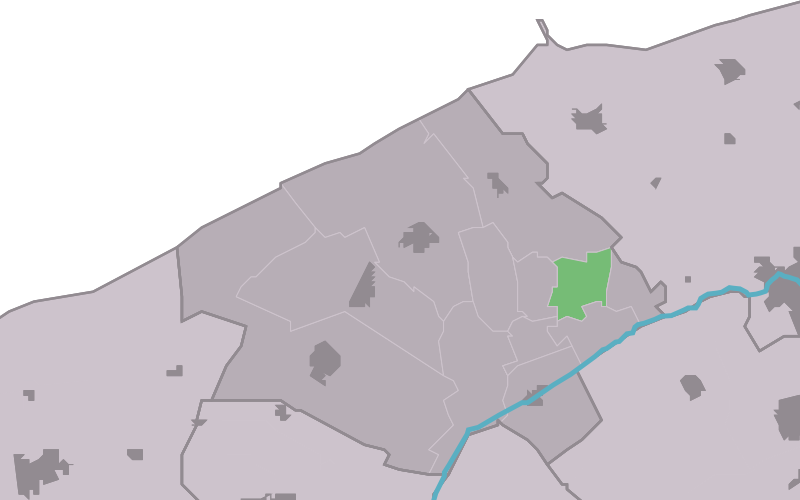
- Location in the former Ferwerderadiel municipality

- Location in the Netherlands Reitsum (Netherlands)
- Country: Netherlands
- Province: Friesland
- Municipality: Noardeast-Fryslân

Area
  - Total: 2.81 km^{2} (1.08 sq mi)
- Elevation: 0.7 m (2.3 ft)

Population (2021)
  - Total: 125
  - Density: 44.5/km^{2} (115/sq mi)
- Time zone: UTC+1 (CET)
  - Summer (DST): UTC+2 (CEST)
- Postal code: 9175
- Dialing code: 0519

Reitsum is a village in Noardeast-Fryslân municipality in the province of Friesland, the Netherlands. It had a population of around 133 in January 2017. Before 2019, the village was part of the Ferwerderadiel municipality.

== History ==
The village was first mentioned between 822 and c. 825 as in Richeim. The etymology is unclear. Reitsum is a terp (artificial living mound) village dating several centuries before Christ. It is one of the four so-called Vlieterpen (literally: flee terps) with a church and a couple of houses. The nearby farmers and their cattle could take shelter on the mound in case of high water.

The Dutch Reformed church was built in 1738. A tower was added and the church was enlarged in 1874. In 1861, Johannes Ploos van Amstel became a minister of the church. On 10 February 1886, Ploos van Amstel announced as one of the first that he supported Abraham Kuyper which led to the 1886 Dutch Reformed Church split. Even though Ploos van Amstel was formally dismissed, and a lock was installed on the pulpit, he continued to preach in the village.

In 1840, Reitsum was home to 88 people. Most of the terp was excavated in the late-19th century.

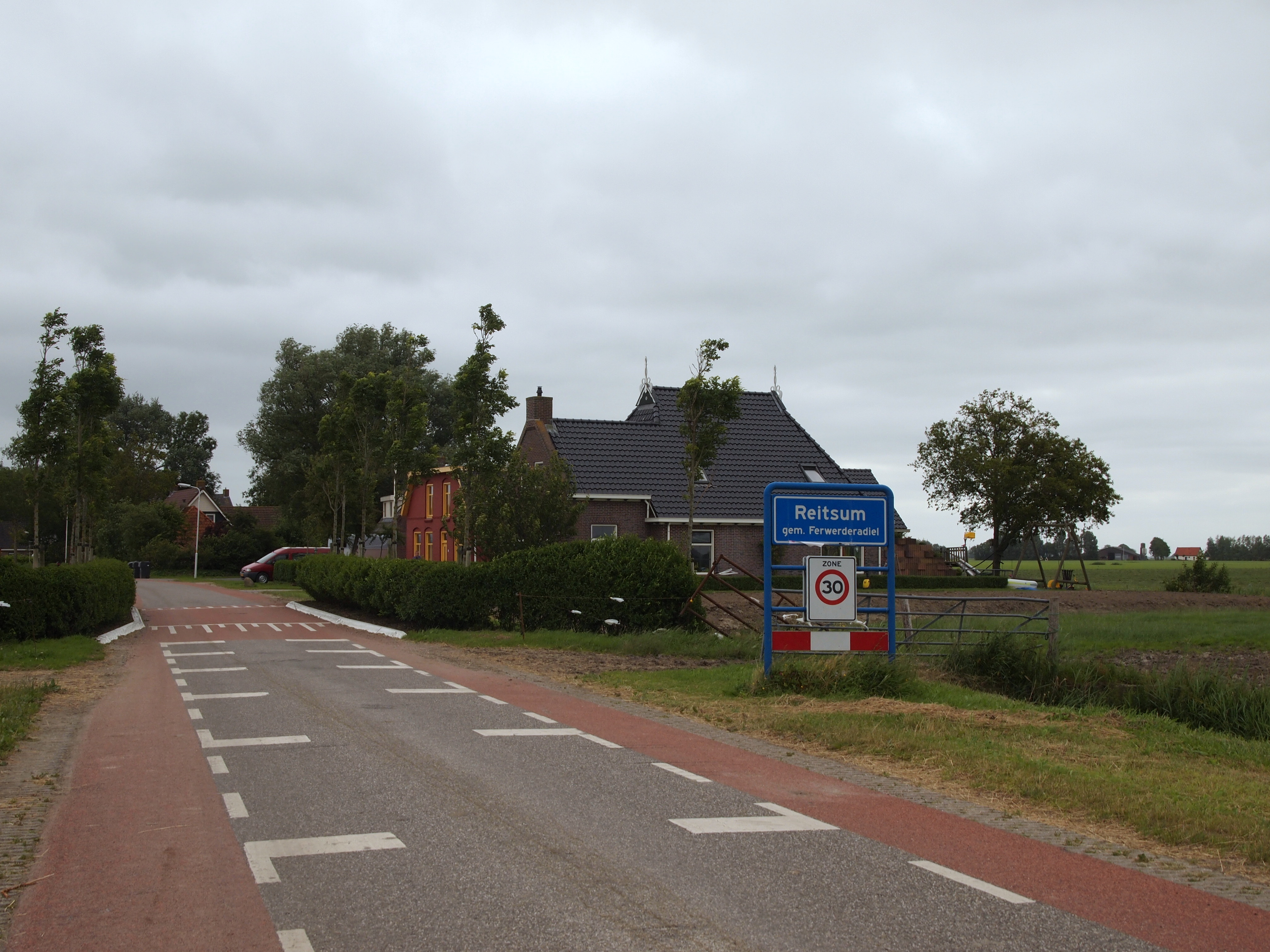
Town sign at entry into Reitsum
