= Wânswert =

Wânswert Wanswerd
- Village
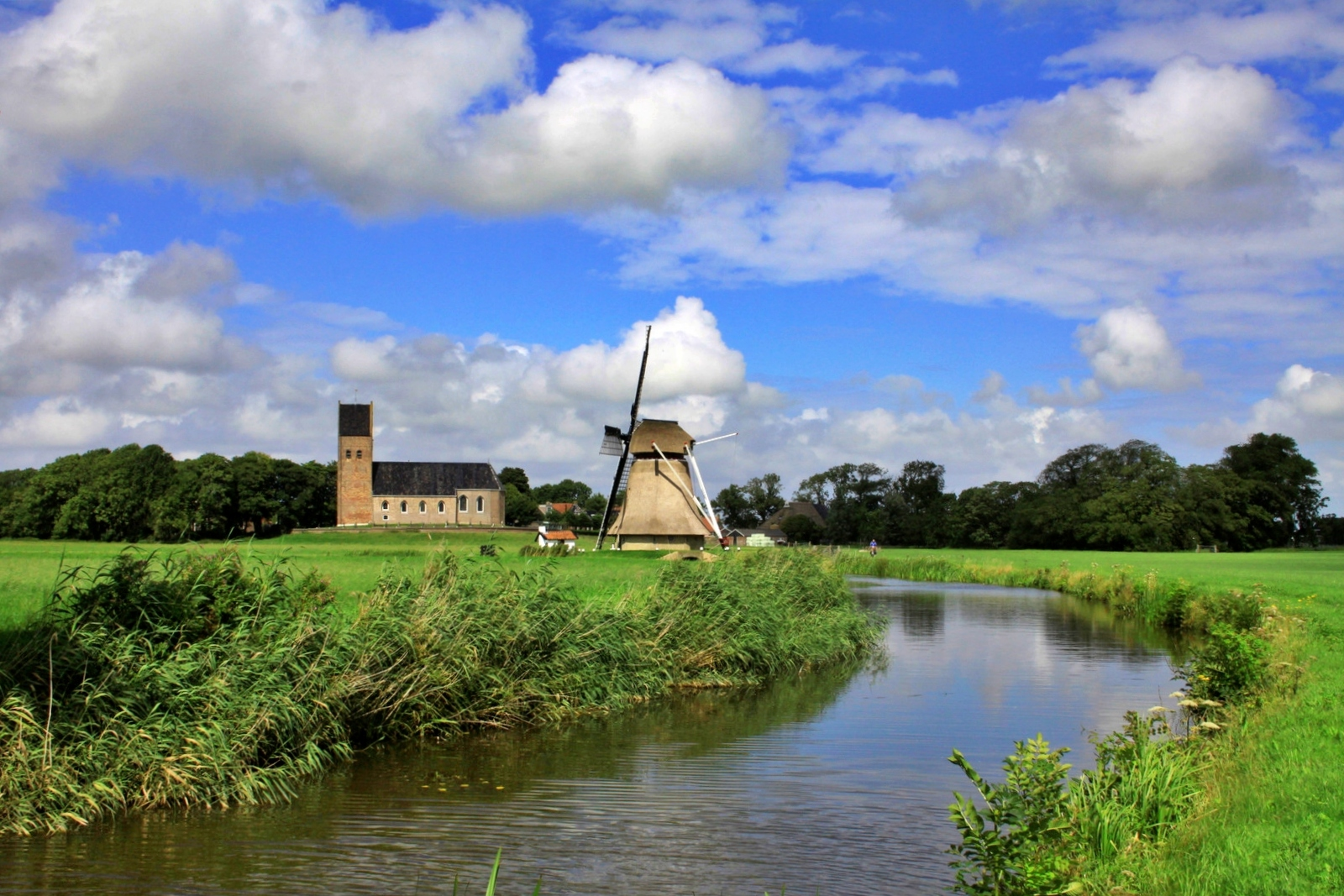
- Wânswert church and windmill

- Flag

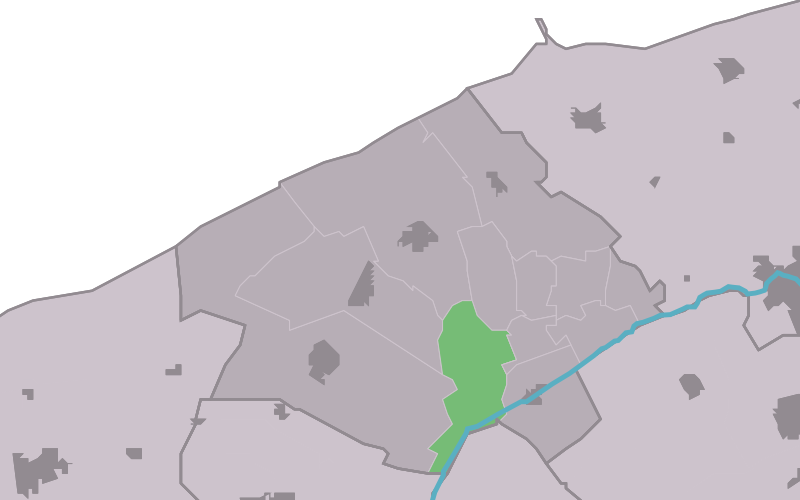
- Location in the former Ferwerderadiel municipality

- Location in the Netherlands Wânswert (Netherlands)
- Country: Netherlands
- Province: Friesland
- Municipality: Noardeast-Fryslân

Area
  - Total: 6.80 km^{2} (2.63 sq mi)
- Elevation: 0.3 m (0.98 ft)

Population (2021)
  - Total: 220
  - Density: 32/km^{2} (84/sq mi)
- Time zone: UTC+1 (CET)
  - Summer (DST): UTC+2 (CEST)
- Postal code: 9178
- Dialing code: 0519

Wânswert (Dutch: Wanswerd) is a village in Noardeast-Fryslân in the province of Friesland, the Netherlands. It had a population of approximately 193 in January 2017. Before 2019, the village was part of the Ferwerderadiel municipality.

== History ==
The village was first mentioned in the 13th century as Wandelswert, and means "terp of Wandilo." Wânswert is a terp (artificial living mound) village dating from several centuries before Christ. The choir of the Dutch Reformed church dates from 1335. The nave and tower were built in the 16th century.

In 1840, Wânswert was home to 343 people. The polder mill De Victor was built in 1867 and was built to replace six small windmill and three tjaskers. It was restored between 1975 and 1977, and since 2006 serves as a backup and sometimes aid to the pumping station. In the late-19th century, the southern side of the terp was excavated.

== Gallery ==
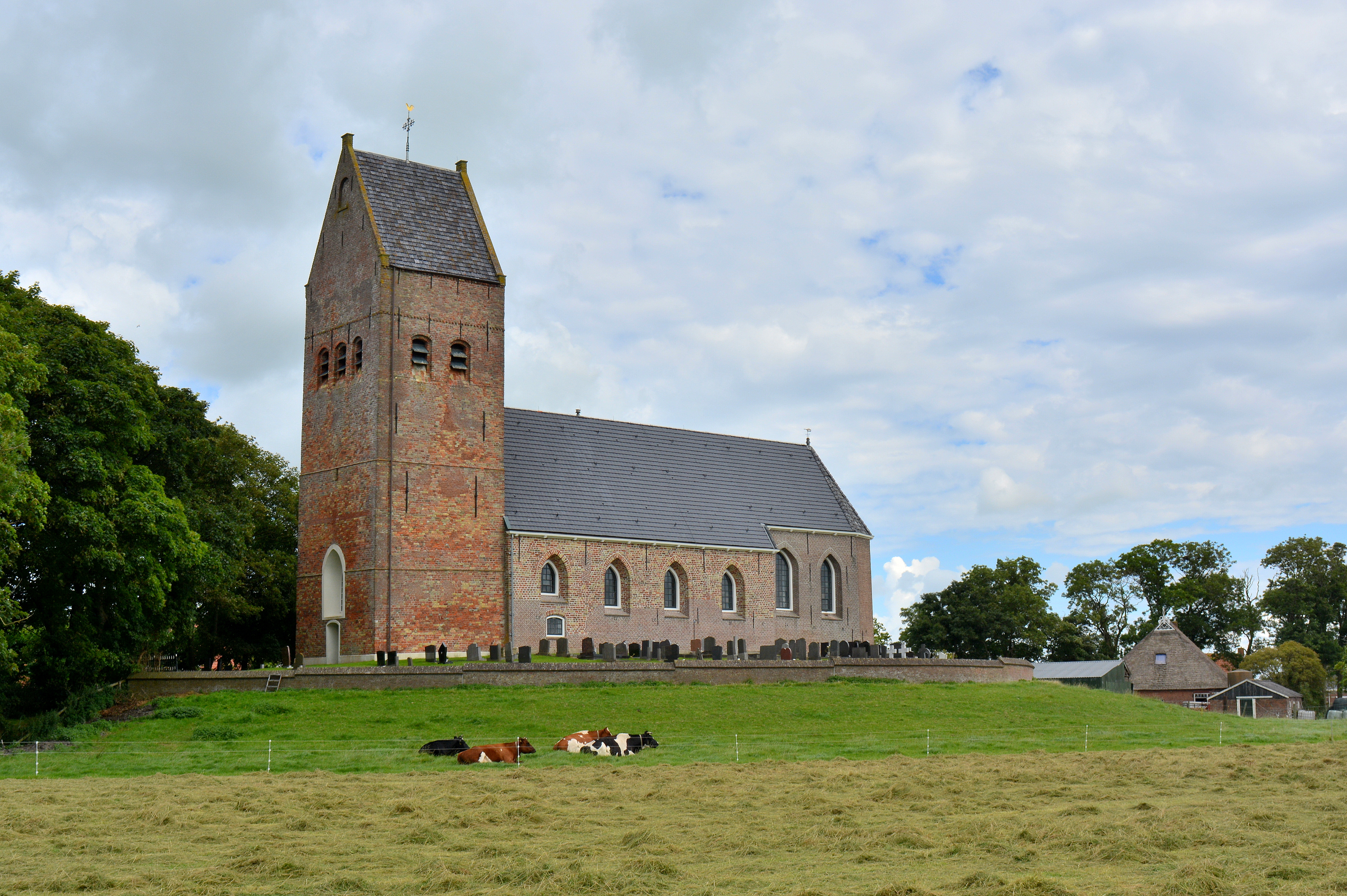
Dutch Reformed church

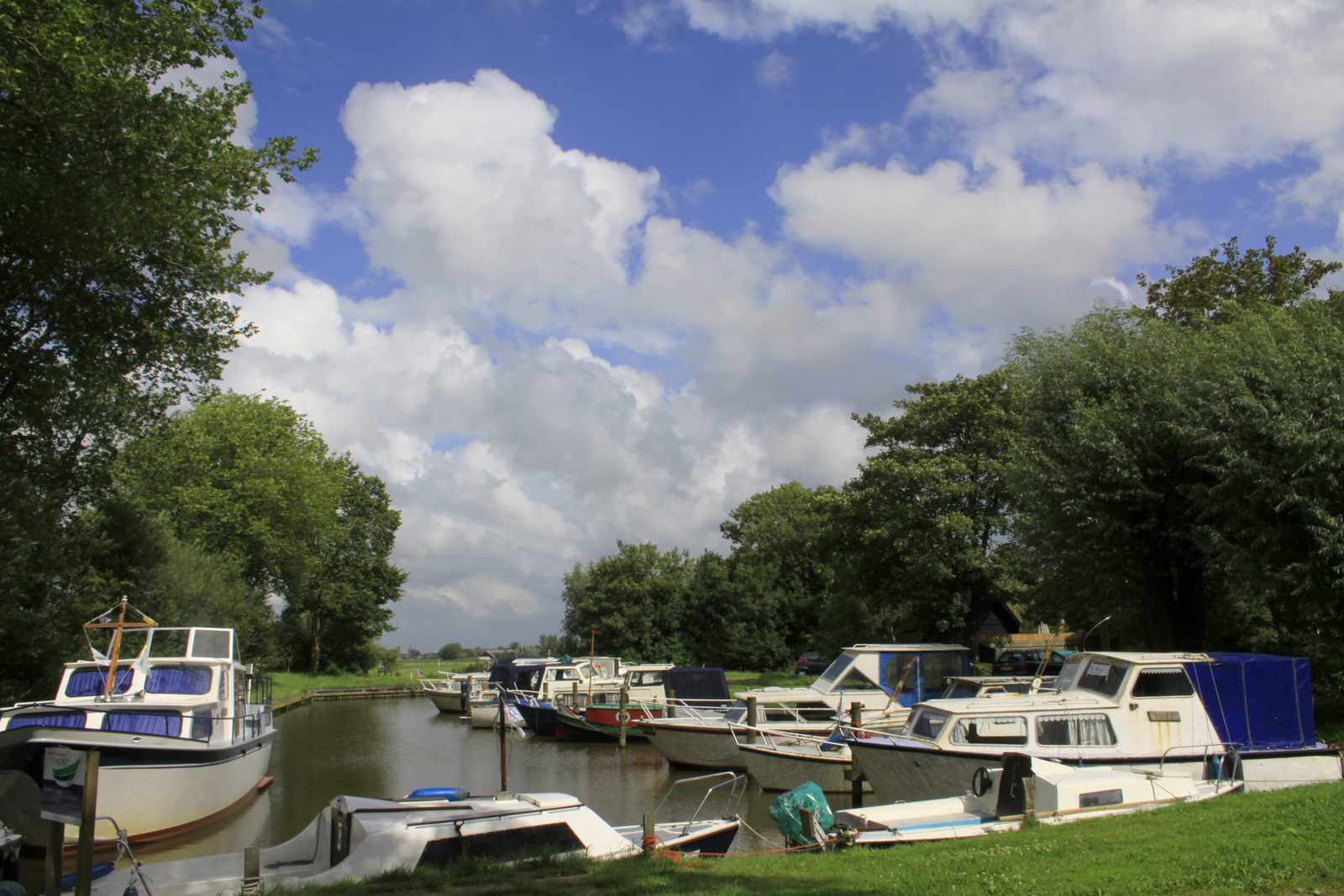
The marina

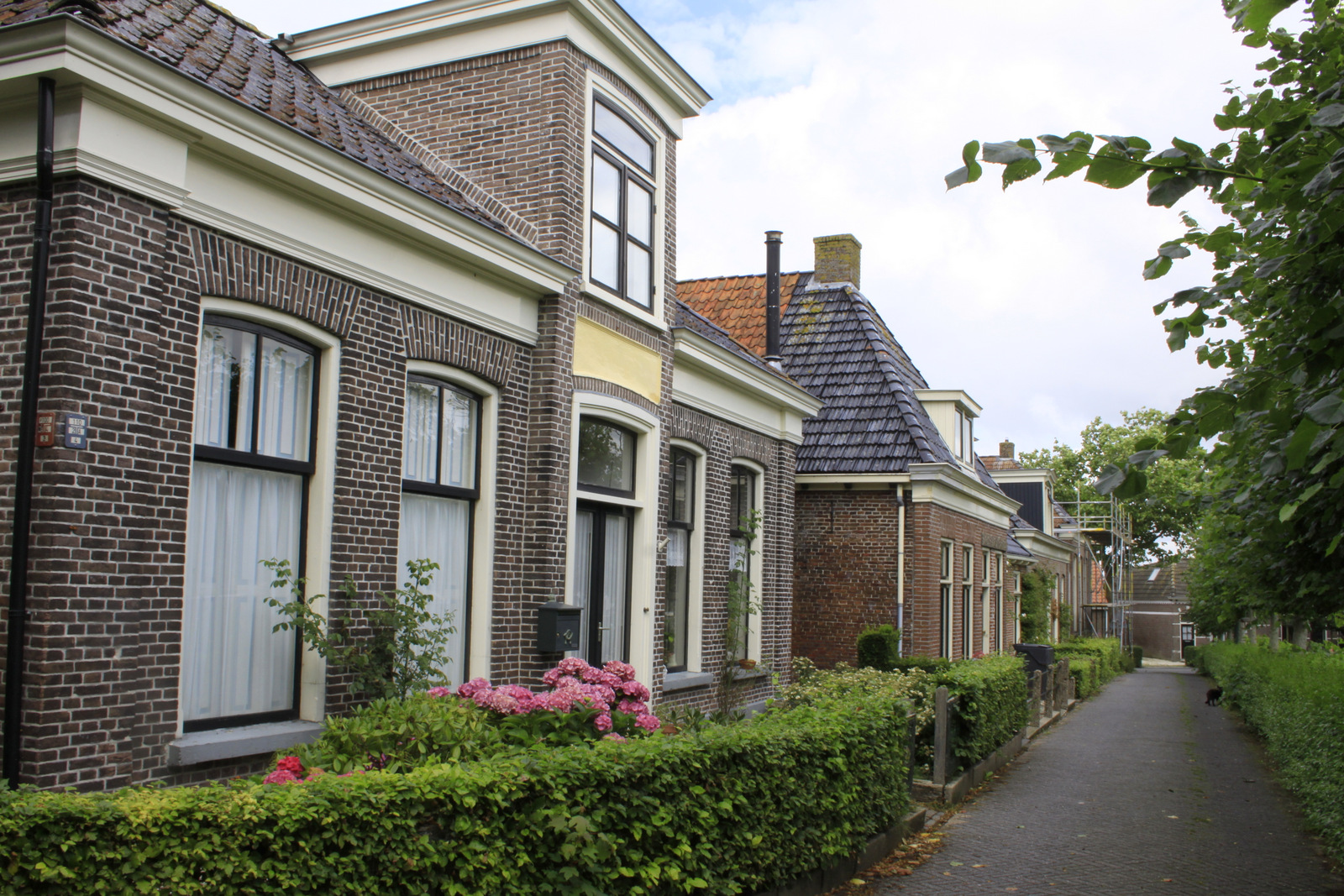
View on Wânswert

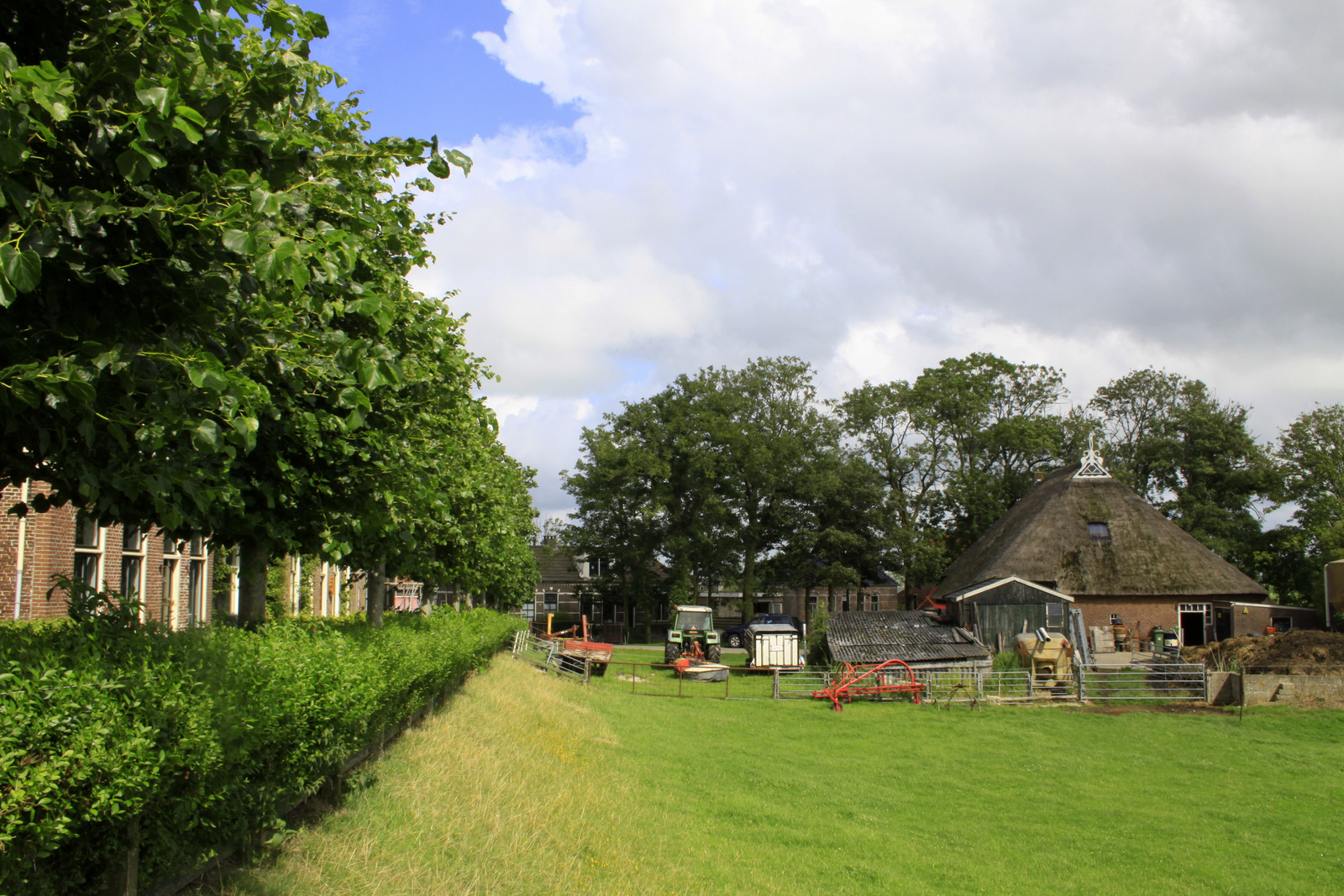
Farm in Wânswert

== Notable people ==
- Rein Halbersma (1949–2021), painter.
