= Blije =

Blije Blija
- Village
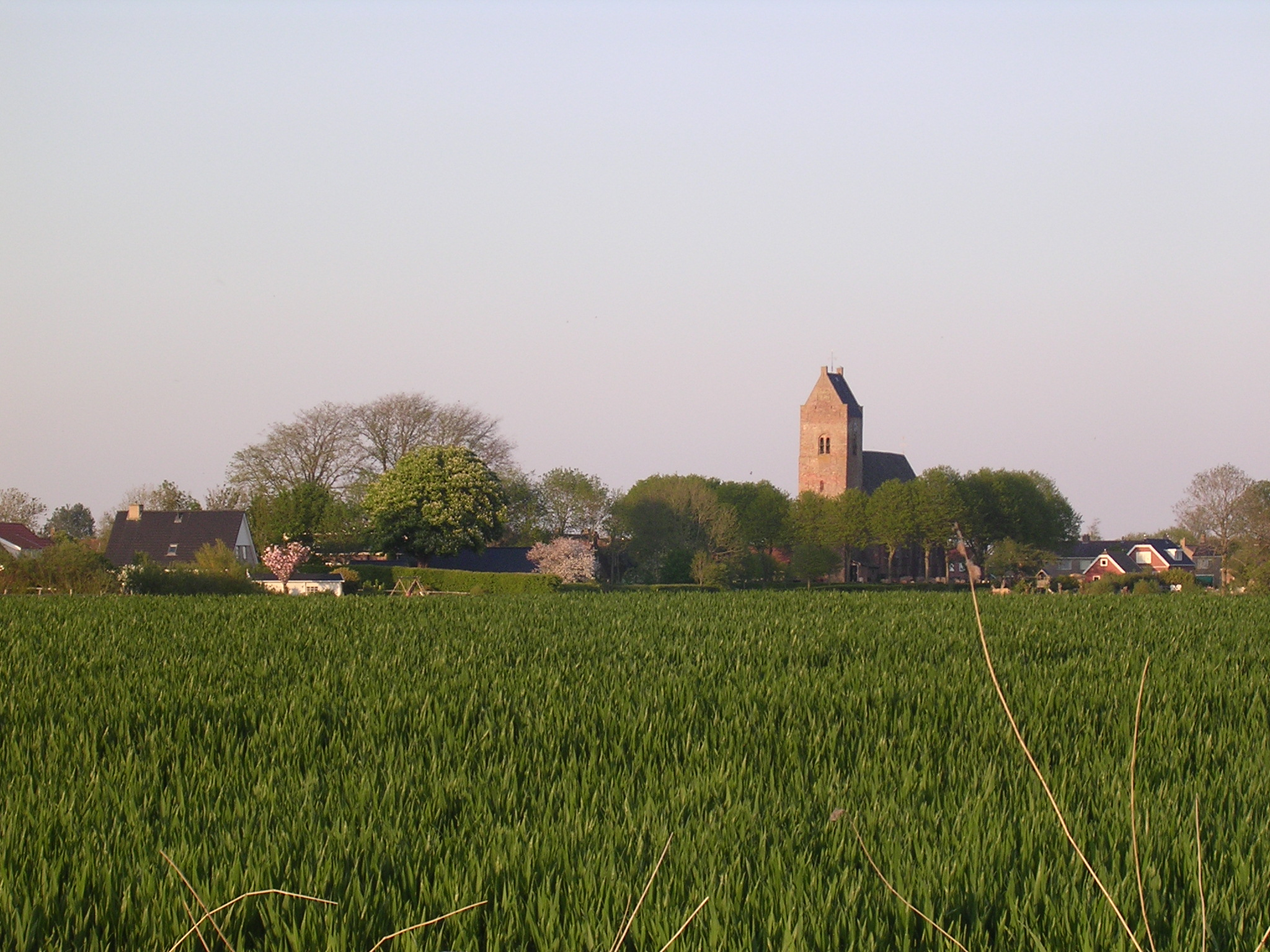
- Blije seen from the west (2008)

- Flag

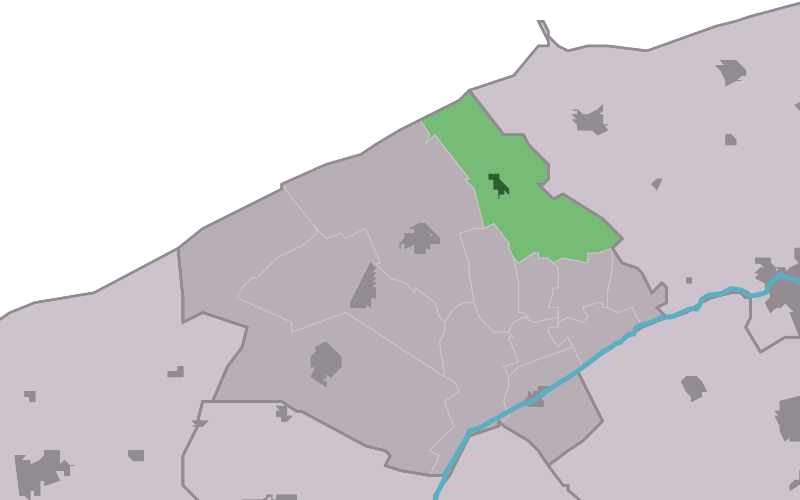
- Location in the former Ferwerderadiel municipality

- Location in the Netherlands Blije (Netherlands)
- Country: Netherlands
- Province: Friesland
- Municipality: Noardeast-Fryslân

Area
  - Total: 12.50 km^{2} (4.83 sq mi)
- Elevation: 0.9 m (3.0 ft)

Population (2021)
  - Total: 840
  - Density: 67/km^{2} (170/sq mi)
- Time zone: UTC+1 (CET)
  - Summer (DST): UTC+2 (CEST)
- Postal code: 9171
- Dialing code: 0519

Blije (Dutch: Blija) is a village in Noardeast-Fryslân in the province of Friesland, the Netherlands. It had a population of around 860 in January 2017. Before 2019, the village was part of the Ferwerderadiel municipality.

== History ==
The village was first mentioned in the 13th century as Blitha. The etymology is unclear. Blije is a terp (artificial living mound) village which developed several centuries before Christ. The Dutch Reformed church dates from the 13th century and received its current shape in 1741.

In 1840, Blije was home to 911 people. Most of the terp except for the graveyard was excavated during the late-19th century. During the 20th century, retail disappeared from the village, and only the pub remained.

== People from Blije ==
- Watze Cuperus (1891-1966), writer

== Gallery ==
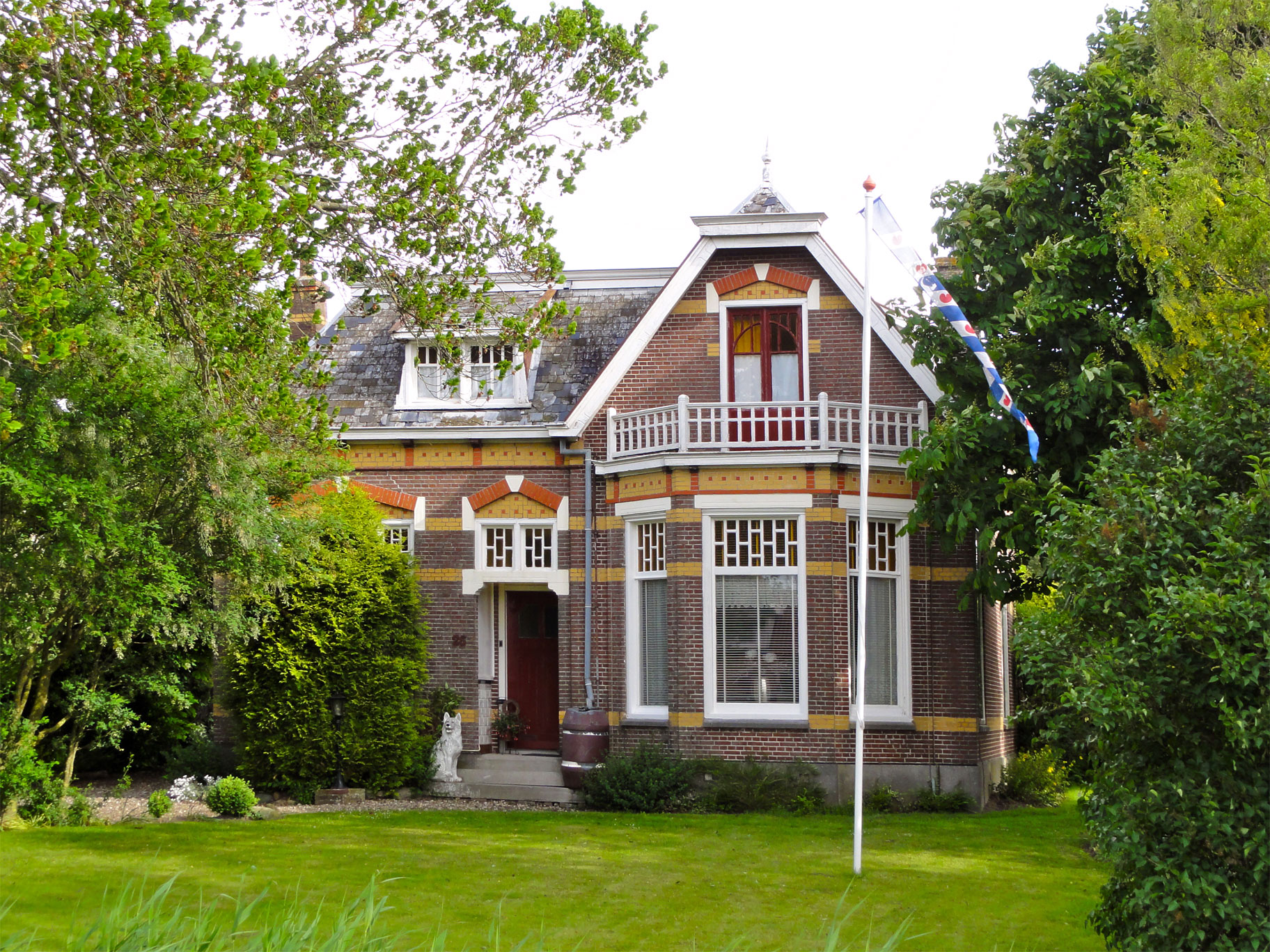
House in Blije

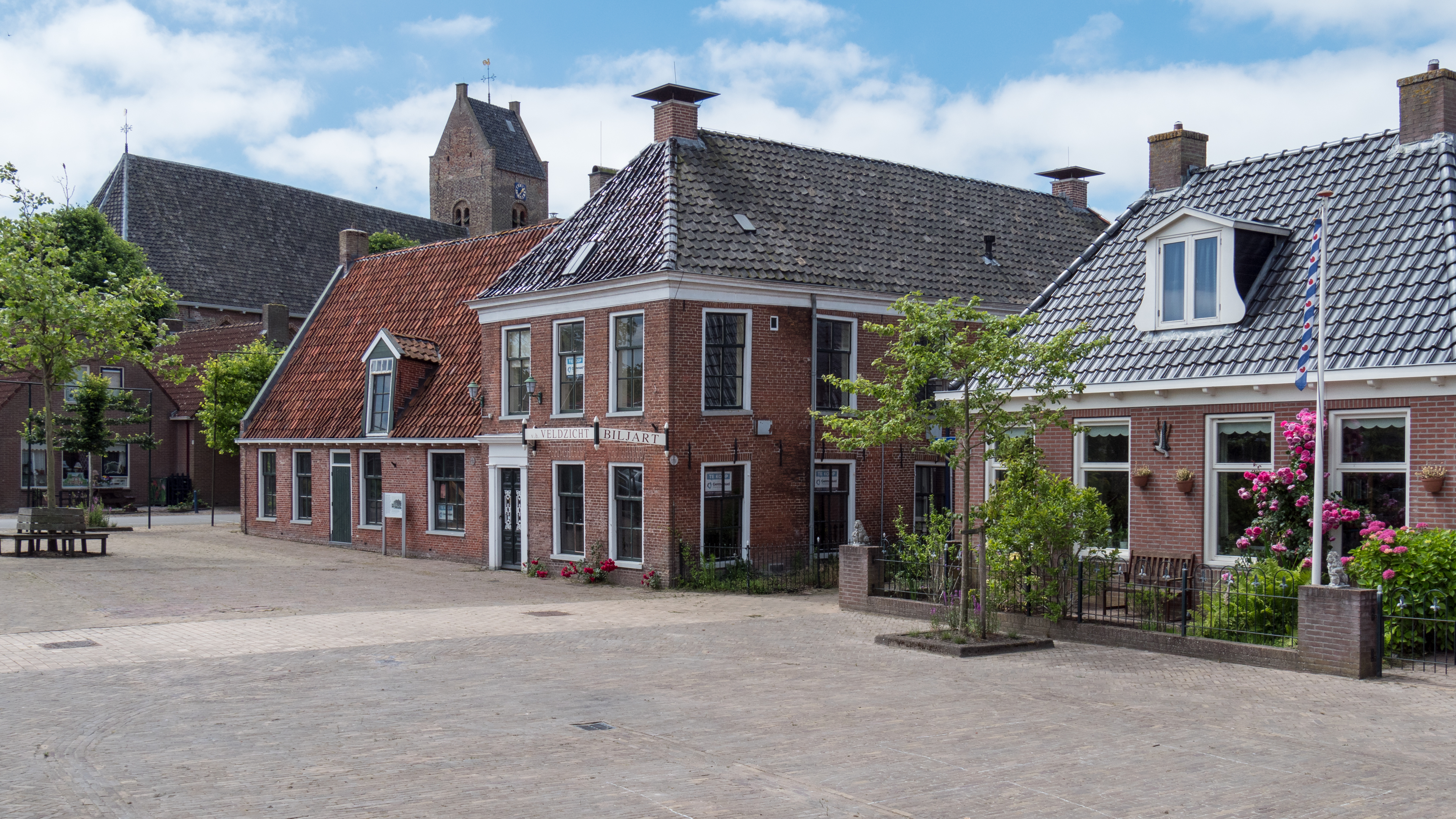
Main street

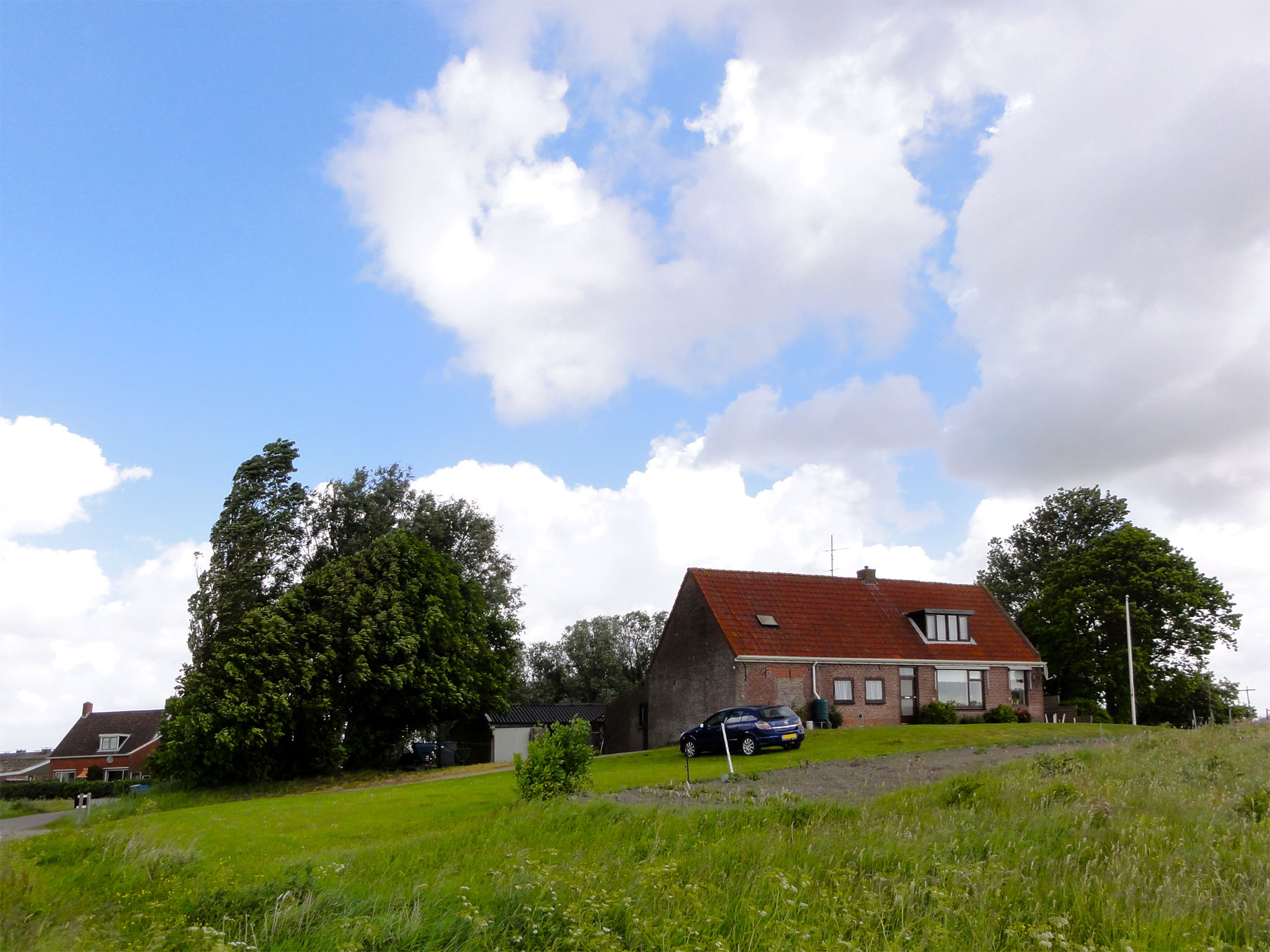
House on a little terp

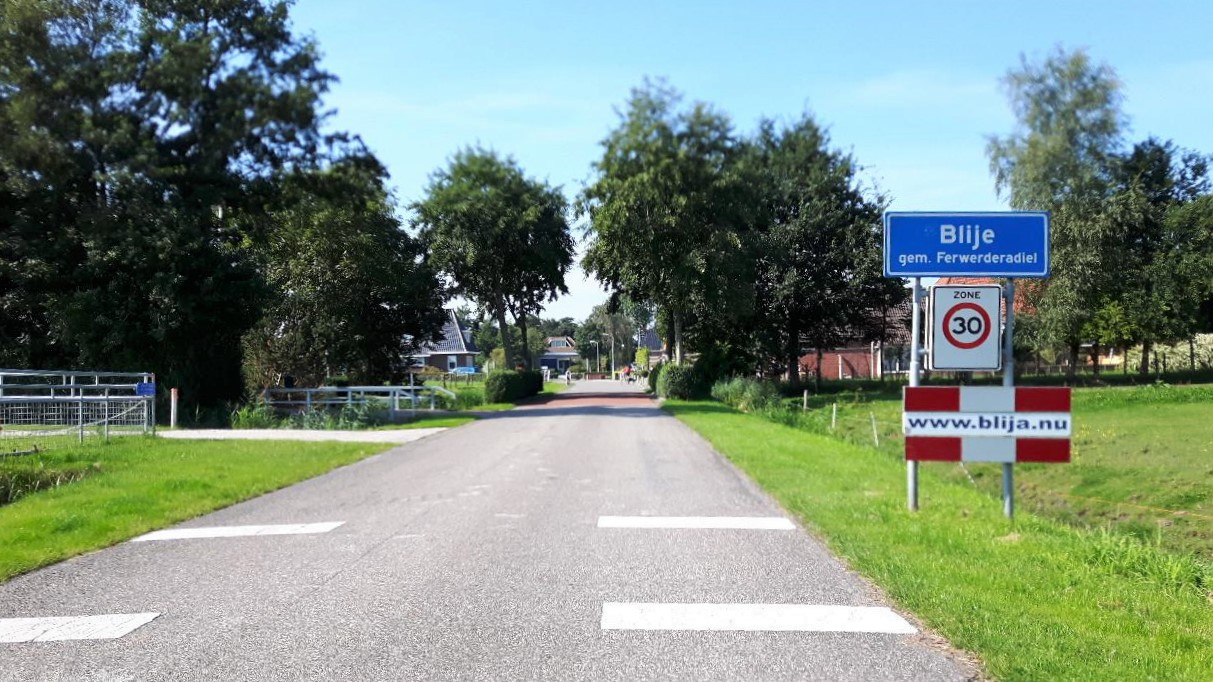
Welcome to Blije
