= Pieter Boeles =

Dutch Minister and linguist

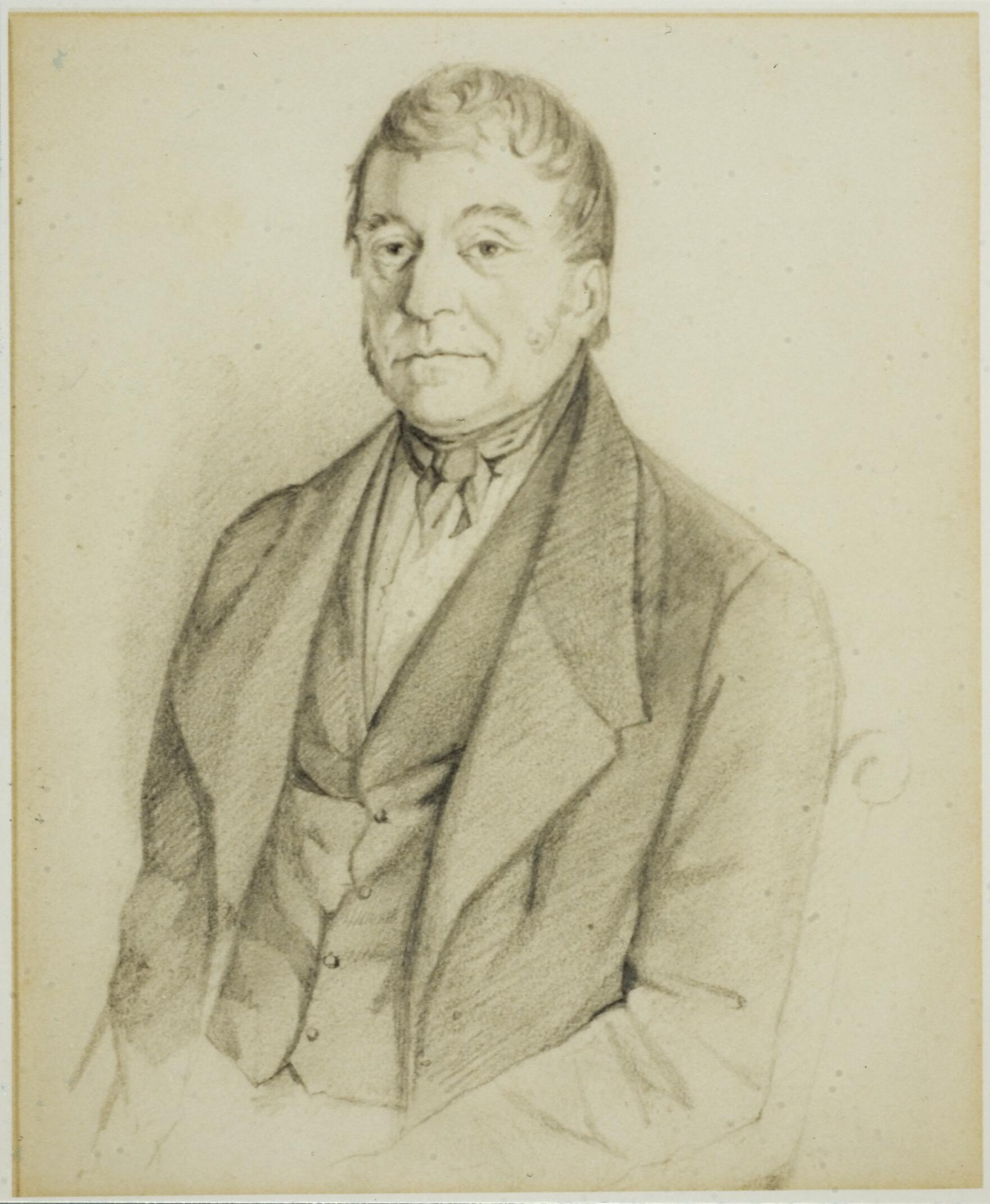
- Born: Pijtter Boeles; 4 March 1795; Ferwerd, Netherlands
- Died: 26 April 1875 (aged 80); Groningen, Netherlands
- Occupation: Minister

Pijtter (Pieter) Boeles (1795–1875) was a Dutch Minister and linguist.

== Biography ==
Boeles, son of the Frisian farmers Jetzo Boeles and Trijntje Pieters, studied theology at the University of Groningen. He completed his major in 1817 with a dissertation, which was published by J. Oomkens Groningen. In the same year he married Alberdina Janna Speckman of Eelde. He was minister of Pingjum, Noordlaren and Noorddijk successively. For the greatest part of his career, from 1827 to 1870, he was last minister of the Reformed Stephanuskerk. He was also a member of the provincial church government, president of the classical association of Groningen and member of the college of supervision of the ecclesiastical administration of Reformed Church in the Groningen Province. In 1853 he was chairman of the national synod of the Reformed Church.

Boeles published ten articles for his pastorate about various affairs, including the fields of religion, religious education, church polity and history. He then wrote the first dictionary of the Gronings dialect, the Idioticon Groninganum: vergelijkend woordenboek van den Groningschen tongval (Idioticon Groninganum: comparative dictionary of the Gronings dialect). This unpublished manuscript was recovered by the professor of Groninger language and culture Siemon Reker in the 1990s and appeared in print in 1997.

In 1850 he received an honorary doctorate from the University of Groningen and during his fiftieth year of his pastorate on November 24, 1867, he became a knight in the Order of the Netherlands Lion.

Pieter Boeles died in 1875 in Groningen at the age of eighty. His son Willem Boele Sophius Boeles was president of the court in Leeuwarden

Boeles was buried in the cemetery at the Reformed Stephanuskerk in Noorddijk

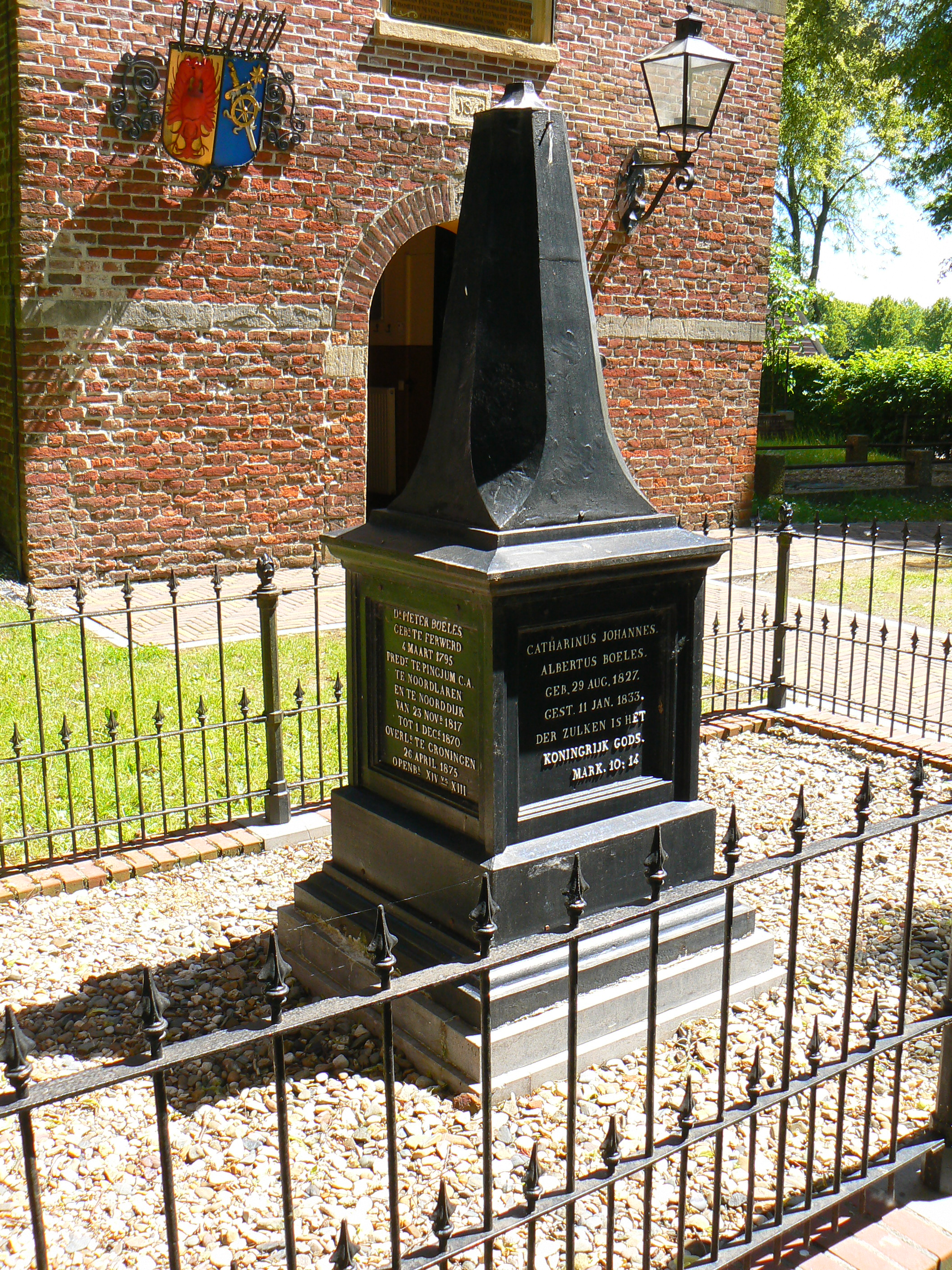
Pieter Boeles's cenotaph in the Noorddijk cemetery
