= Warfstermolen =

Warfstermolen Warfstermûne
- Village
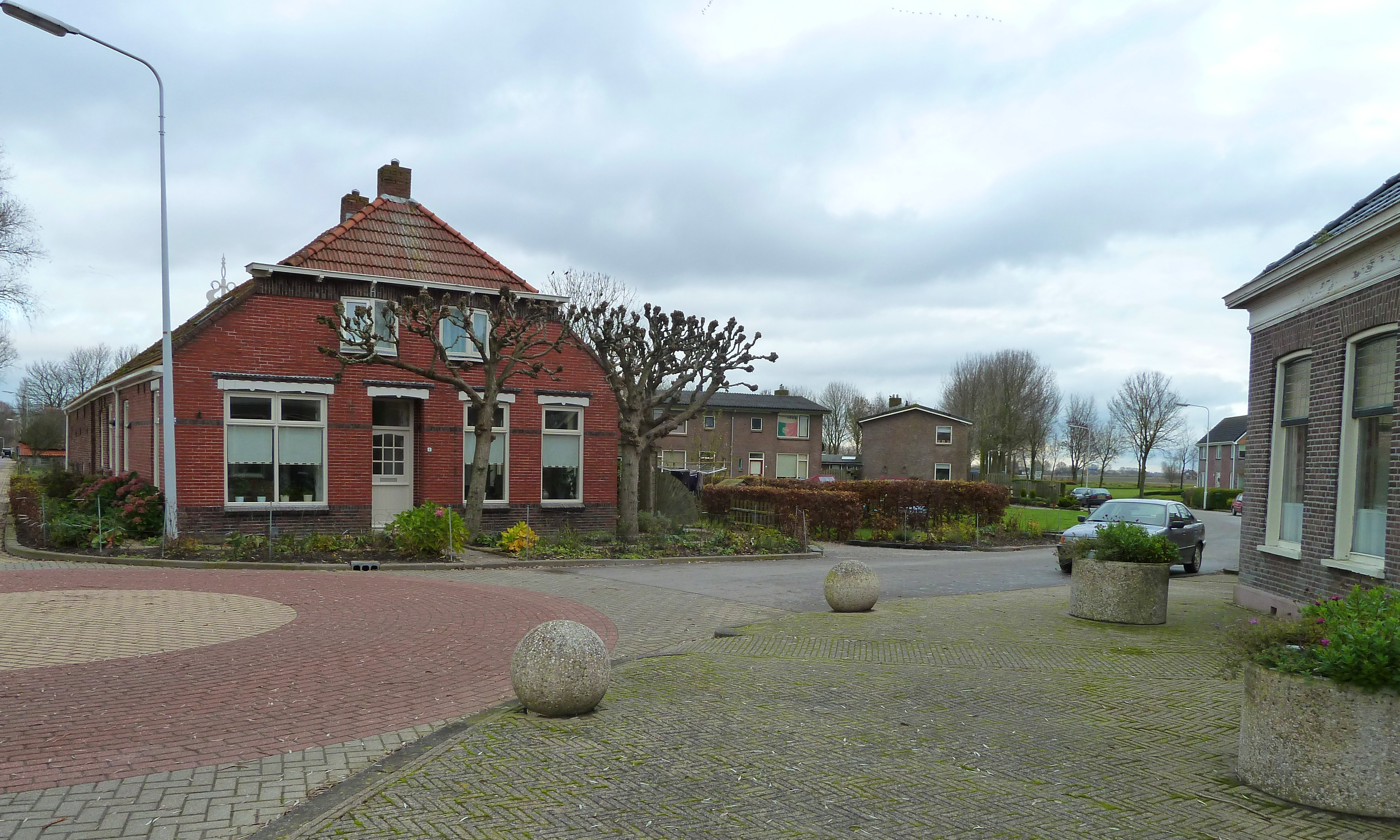

- Flag Coat of arms

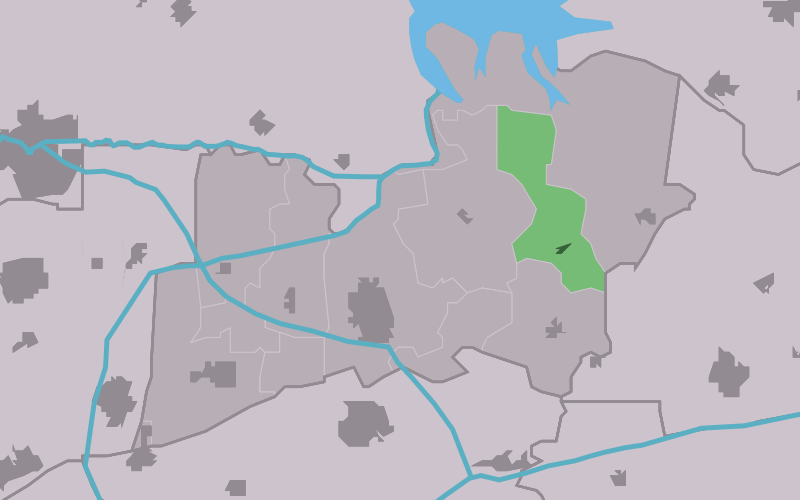
- Location in the former Kollumerland municipality

- Location in the Netherlands Warfstermolen (Netherlands)
- Country: Netherlands
- Province: Friesland
- Municipality: Noardeast-Fryslân

Area
  - Total: 8.29 km^{2} (3.20 sq mi)
- Elevation: 1.2 m (3.9 ft)

Population (2021)
  - Total: 205
  - Density: 24.7/km^{2} (64.0/sq mi)
- Time zone: UTC+1 (CET)
  - Summer (DST): UTC+2 (CEST)
- Postal code: 9852
- Dialing code: 0594

Warfstermolen (West Frisian: Warfstermûne) (Low Saxon: Warfstermeul) is a village in Noardeast-Fryslân municipality, in the province of Friesland, the Netherlands. It had a population of 203 in January 2017. Before 2019, the village was part of the Kollumerland en Nieuwkruisland municipality.

== History ==
The village was first mentioned in 1574 "wyntmolen staende op de dyk by de Warff", and means "windmill near the settlement on the dike". The dike was built around 1315, and Warfstermolen is a linear settlement along the dike. In 1840, Warfstermolen was home to 115 people.

== Gallery ==
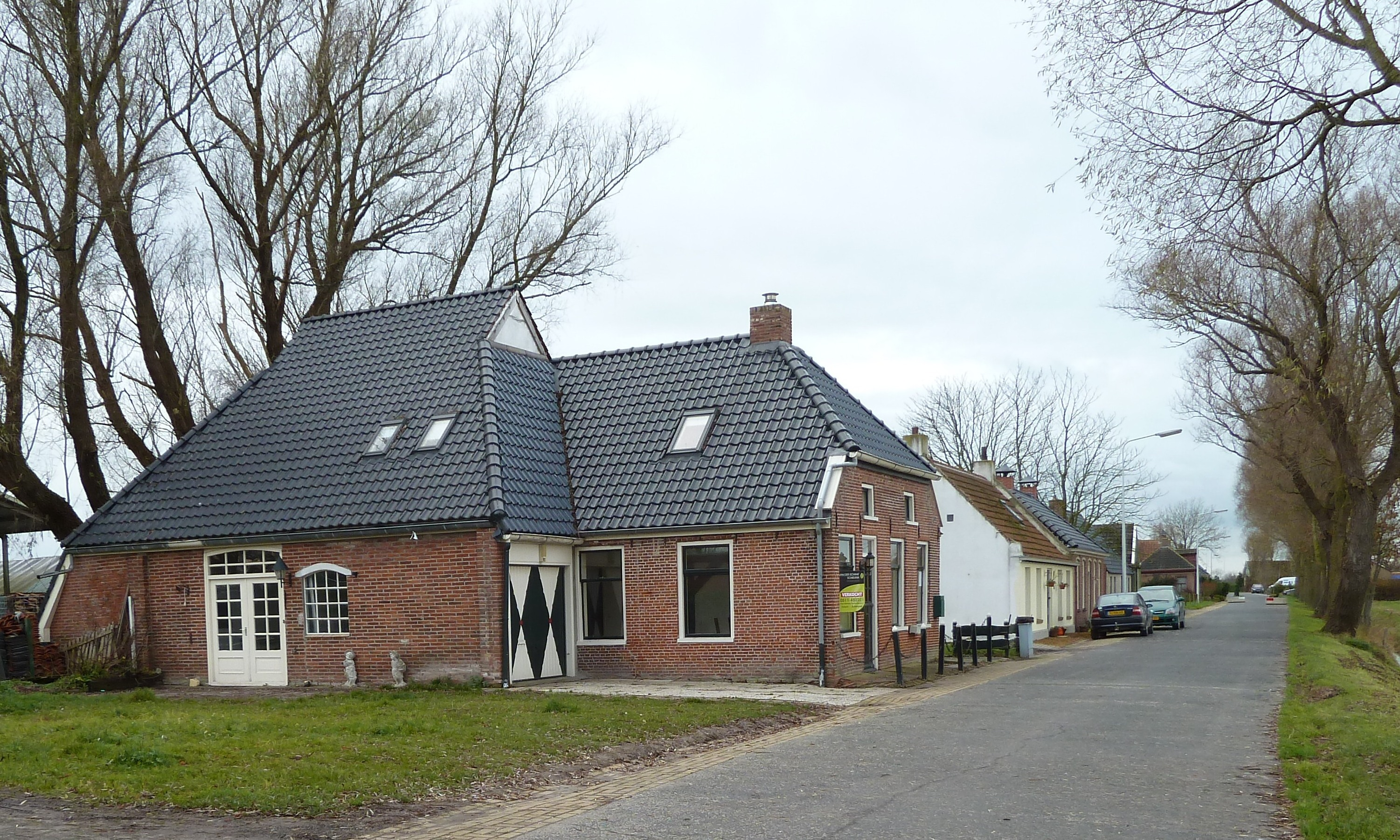
Street view

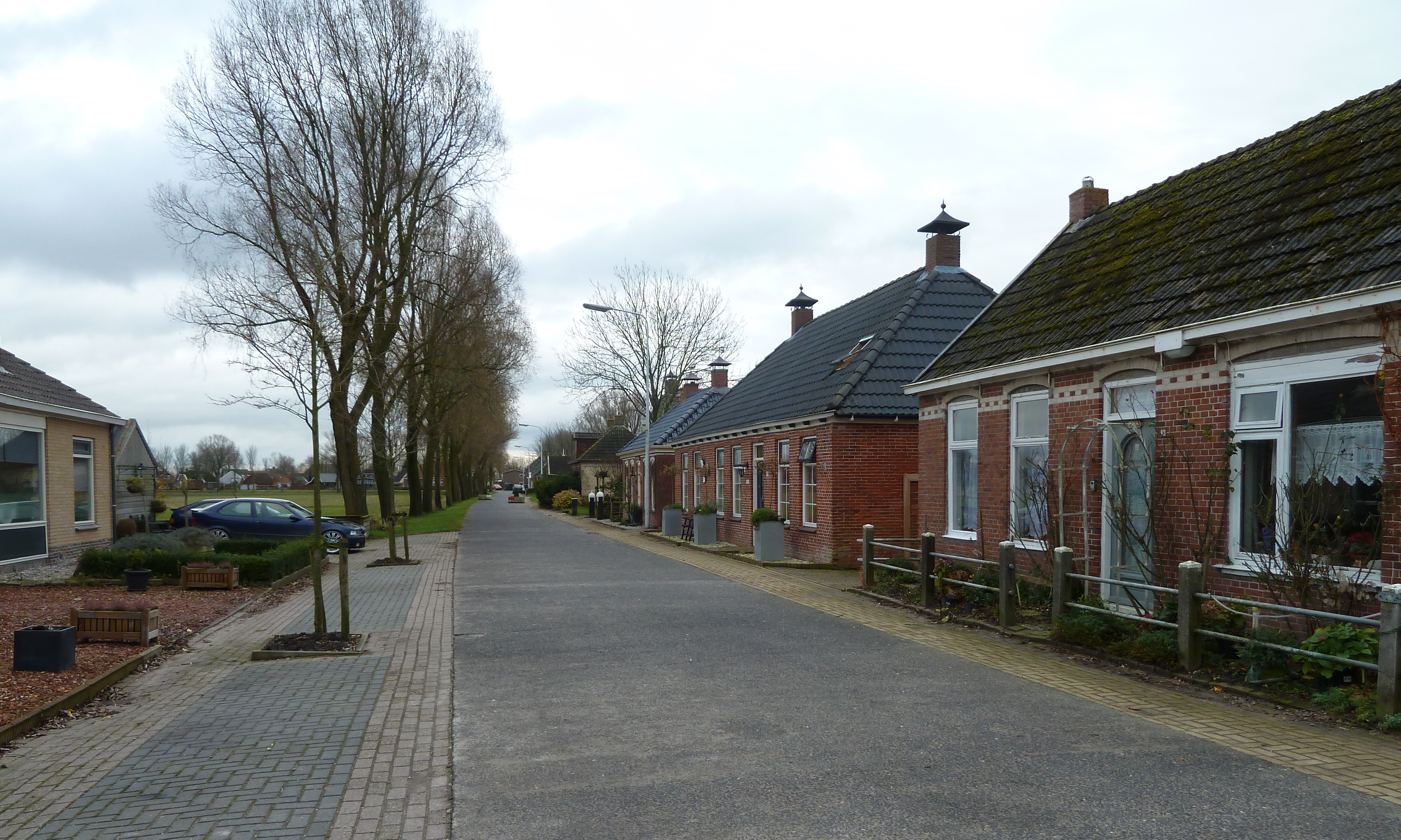
Street view

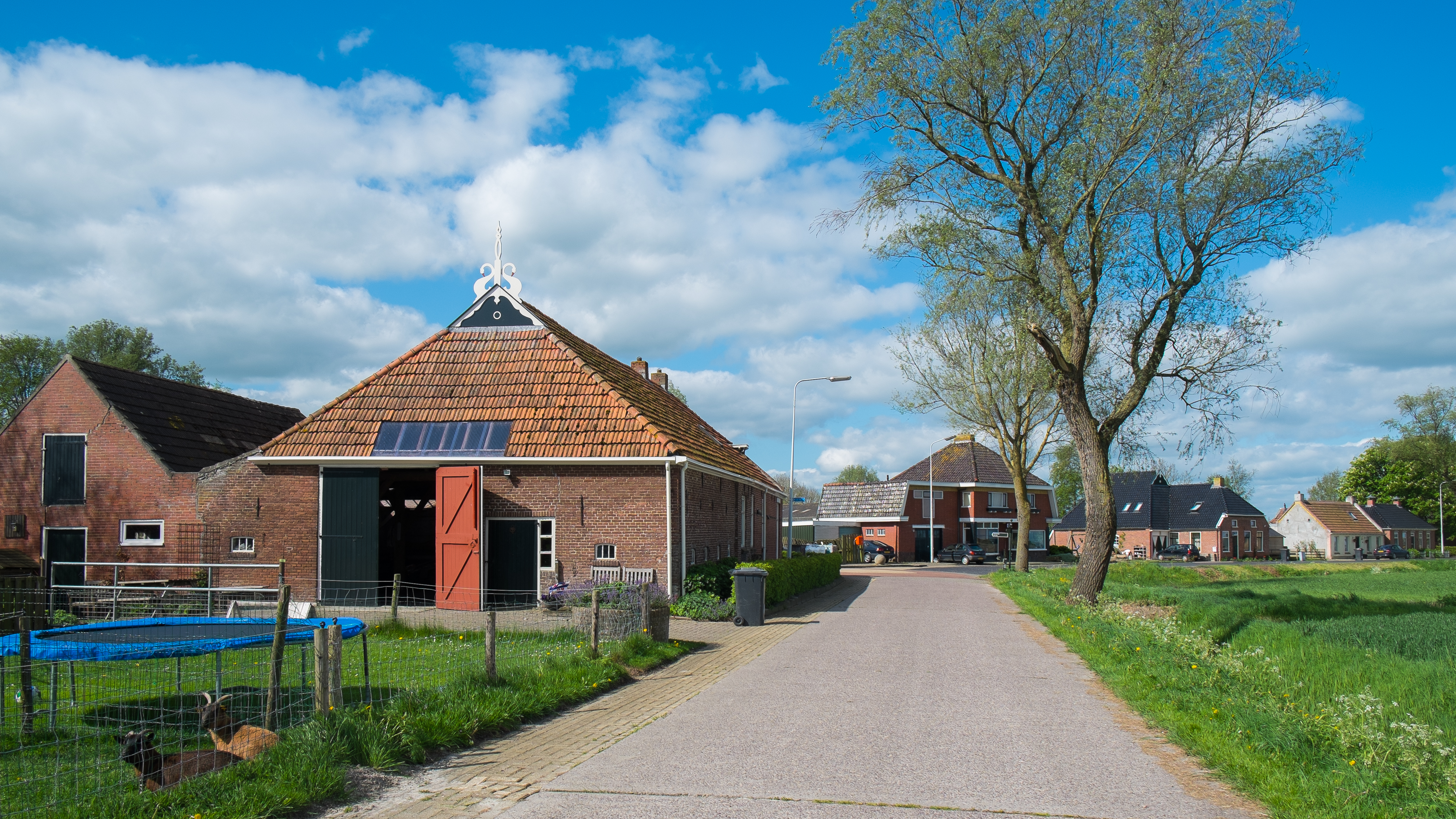
Farms in Warfstermolen
