= De Trieme =

- Village
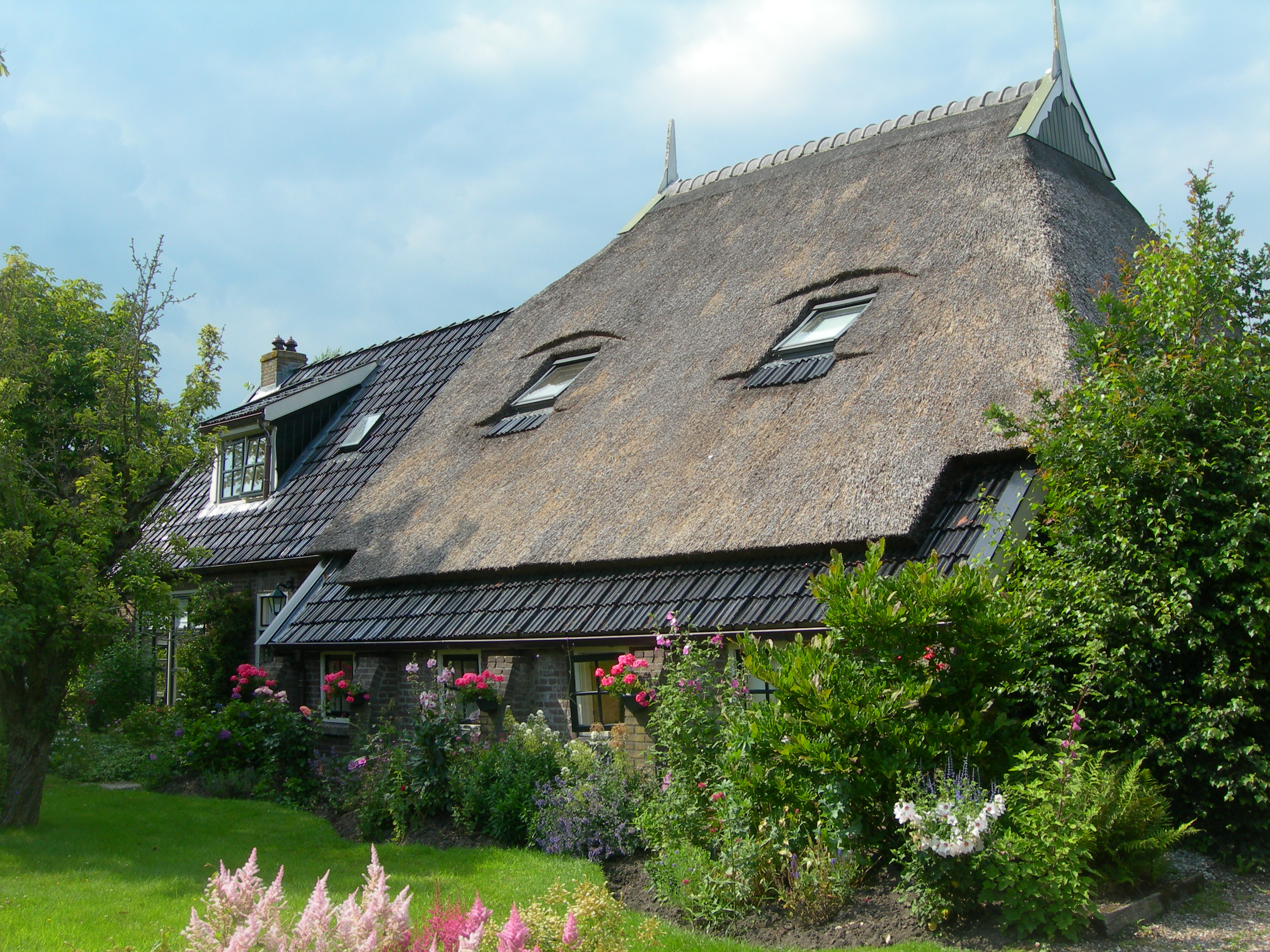
- Farm in De Trieme

- Flag Coat of arms

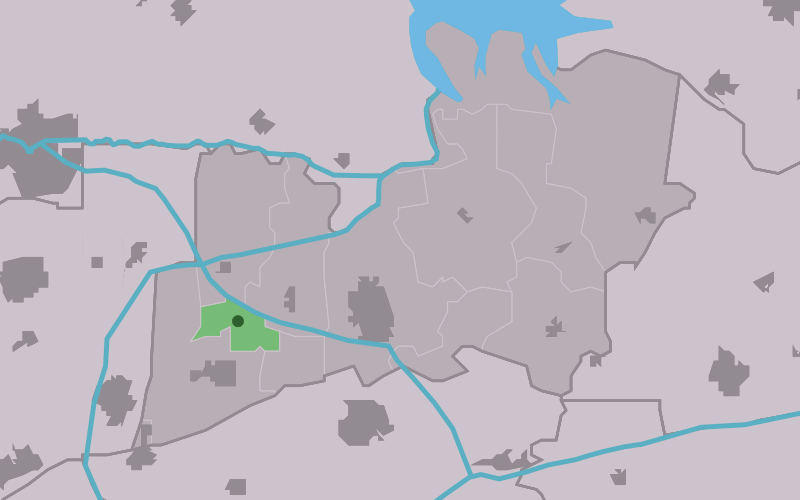
- Location in the former Kollumerland municipality

- Location in the Netherlands De Trieme (Netherlands)
- Country: Netherlands
- Province: Friesland
- Municipality: Noardeast-Fryslân

Area
  - Total: 2.33 km^{2} (0.90 sq mi)
- Elevation: 0.1 m (0.33 ft)

Population (2021)
  - Total: 320
  - Density: 140/km^{2} (360/sq mi)
- Time zone: UTC+1 (CET)
  - Summer (DST): UTC+2 (CEST)
- Postal code: 9296
- Dialing code: 0511

De Trieme (Dutch: Triemen, Low German: De Triem) is a village in Noardeast-Fryslân municipality in the province of Friesland, the Netherlands.

It had a population of around 318 in January 2017. Before 2019, the village was part of the Kollumerland en Nieuwkruisland municipality. The village was first mentioned in 1467 as Trema, and means beam bridge. In 1840, De Trieme was home to 294 people.

The village's official name was changed from Triemen to De Trieme in 2023.

== Gallery ==
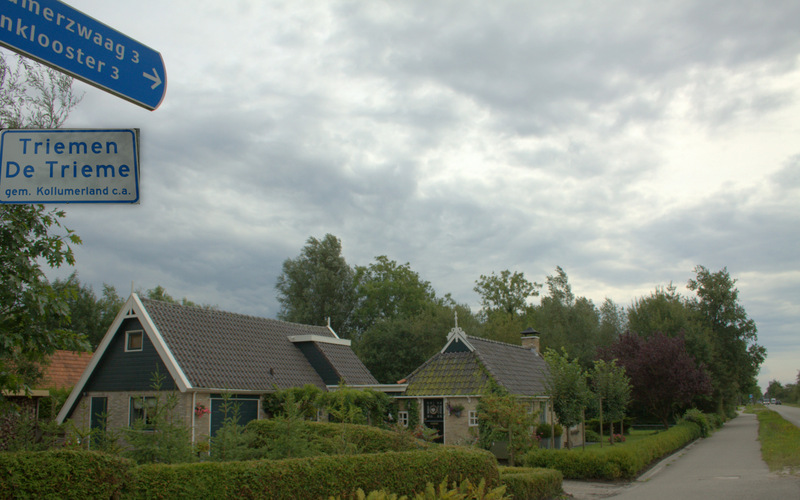
De Trieme

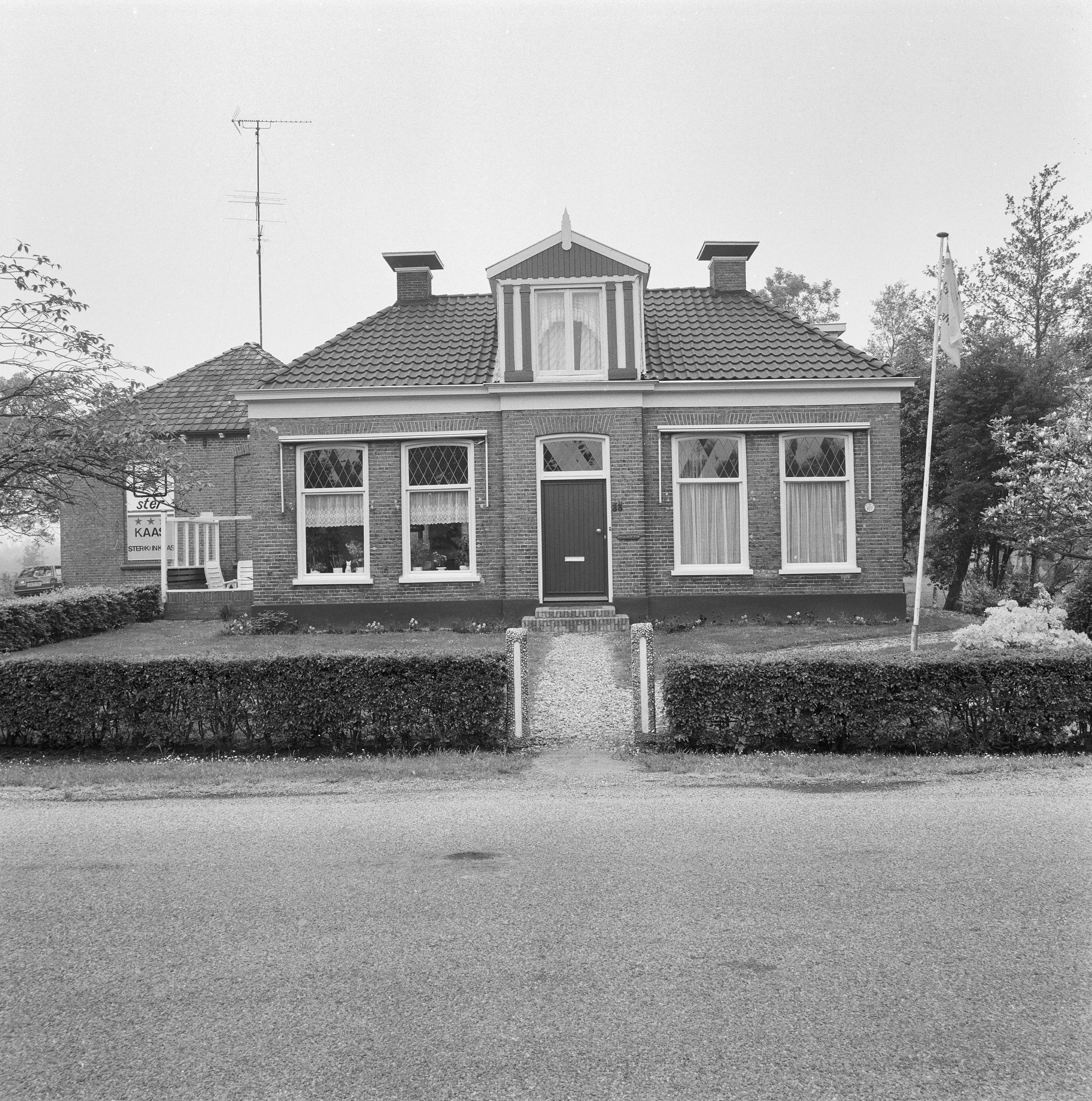
Farm in De Trieme
