= Ingwierrum =

- Village
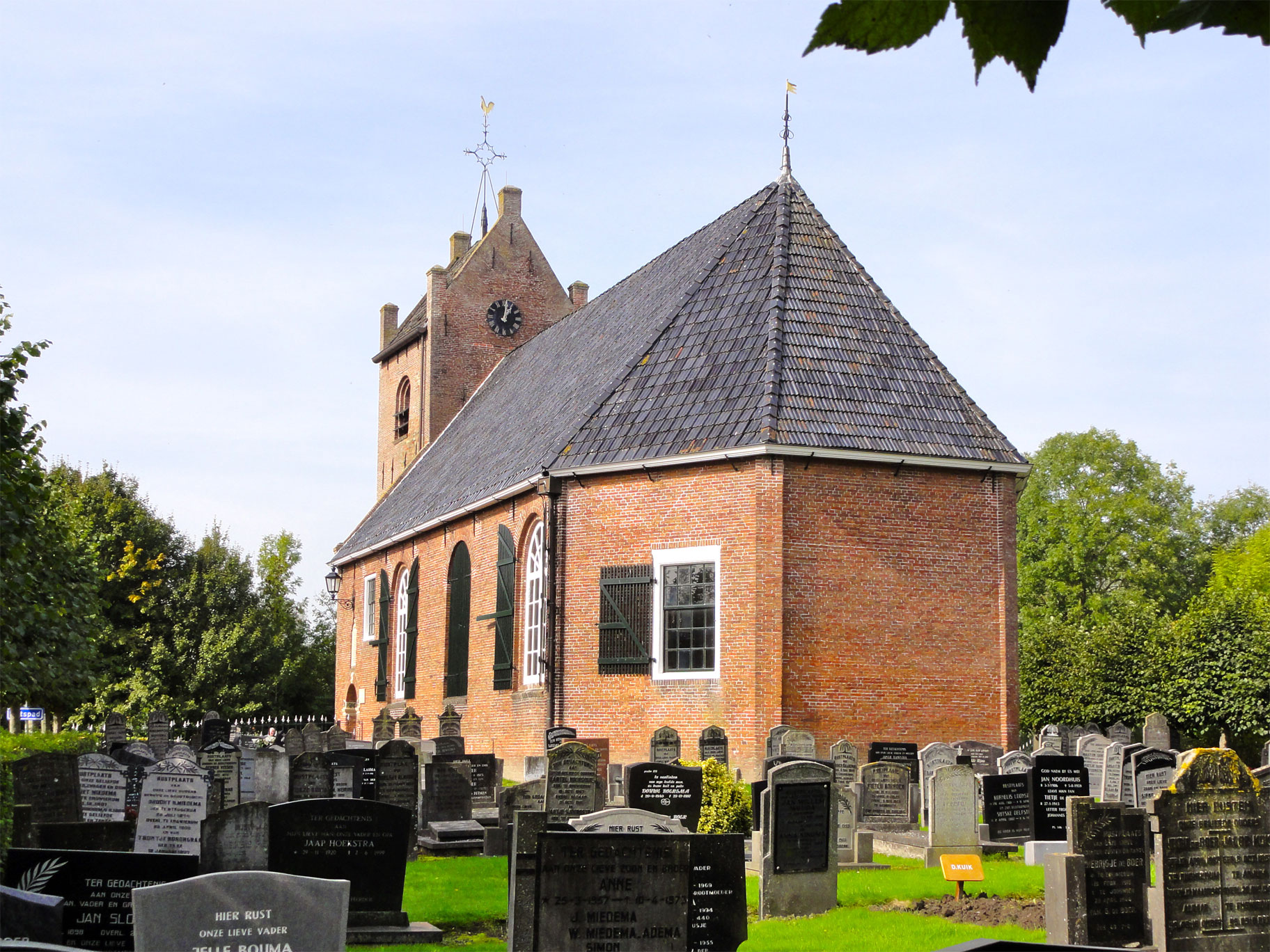
- Ingwierrum church

- Flag Coat of arms

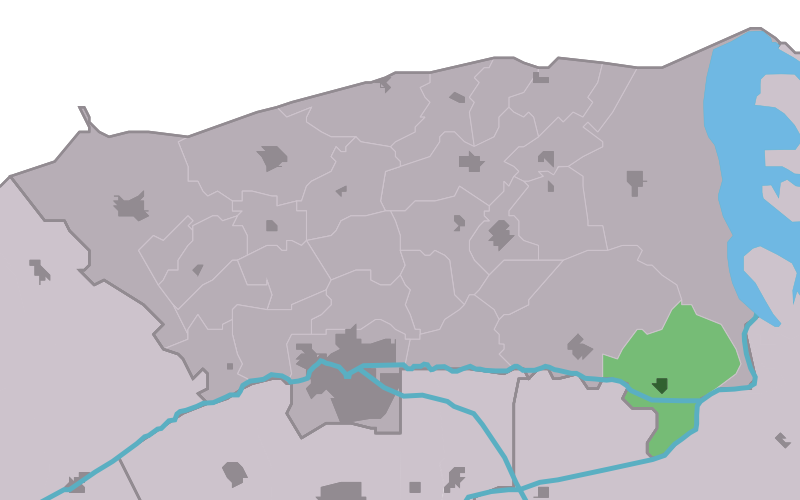
- Location in the former Dongeradeel municipality

- Location in the Netherlands Ingwierrum (Netherlands)
- Country: Netherlands
- Province: Friesland
- Municipality: Noardeast-Fryslân

Area
  - Total: 12.32 km^{2} (4.76 sq mi)
- Elevation: 1.1 m (3.6 ft)

Population (2021)
  - Total: 540
  - Density: 44/km^{2} (110/sq mi)
- Time zone: UTC+1 (CET)
  - Summer (DST): UTC+2 (CEST)
- Postal code: 9132
- Dialing code: 0519

Ingwierrum (Dutch: Engwierum) is a village in Noardeast-Fryslân in the province of Friesland, the Netherlands. It had a population of approximately 565 in January 2017. Before 2019, the village was part of the Dongeradeel municipality.

== History ==
The village was first mentioned in 1447 as Edygwerum, and means "settlement on the terp of the people of Ede (person)." Ingwierrum is a terp (artificial living mound) village from the early middle ages. The Dutch Reformed church has a possibly 13th-century tower which was enlarged in the 14th century. The church building dates from 1746.

In 1719, Ingwierrum was hit by a flood, and the decision was made to dam the Dokkumer Grootdiep. In 1729, an obelisk was placed in Ingwierrum as a monument to the closure of the dike. The locks were restored in 1834. In 1840, Ingwierrum was home to 681 people.

The village's official name was changed from Engwierum to Ingwierrum in 2023.

== Gallery ==
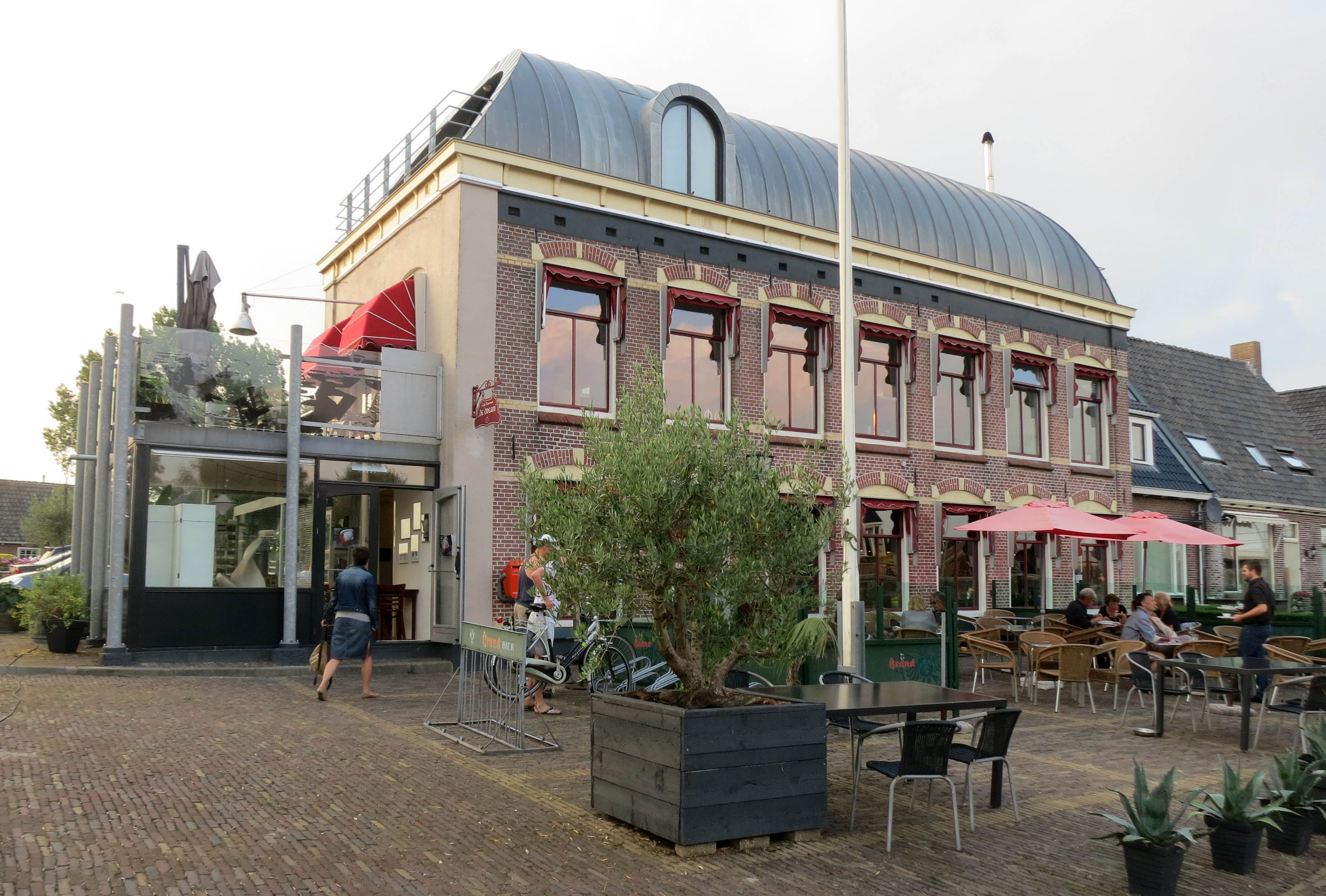
Hotel restaurant in Ingwierrum

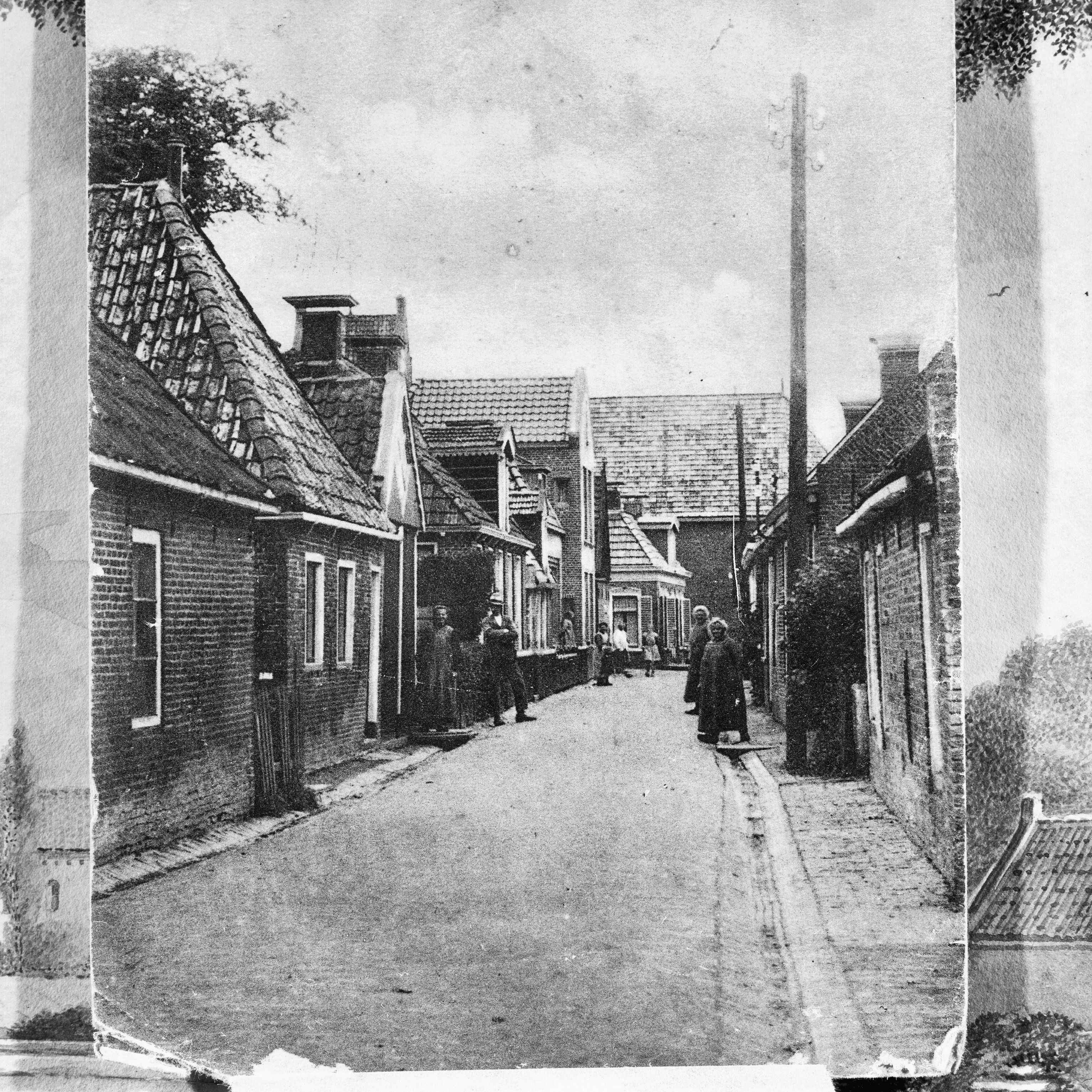
Street view (1920)

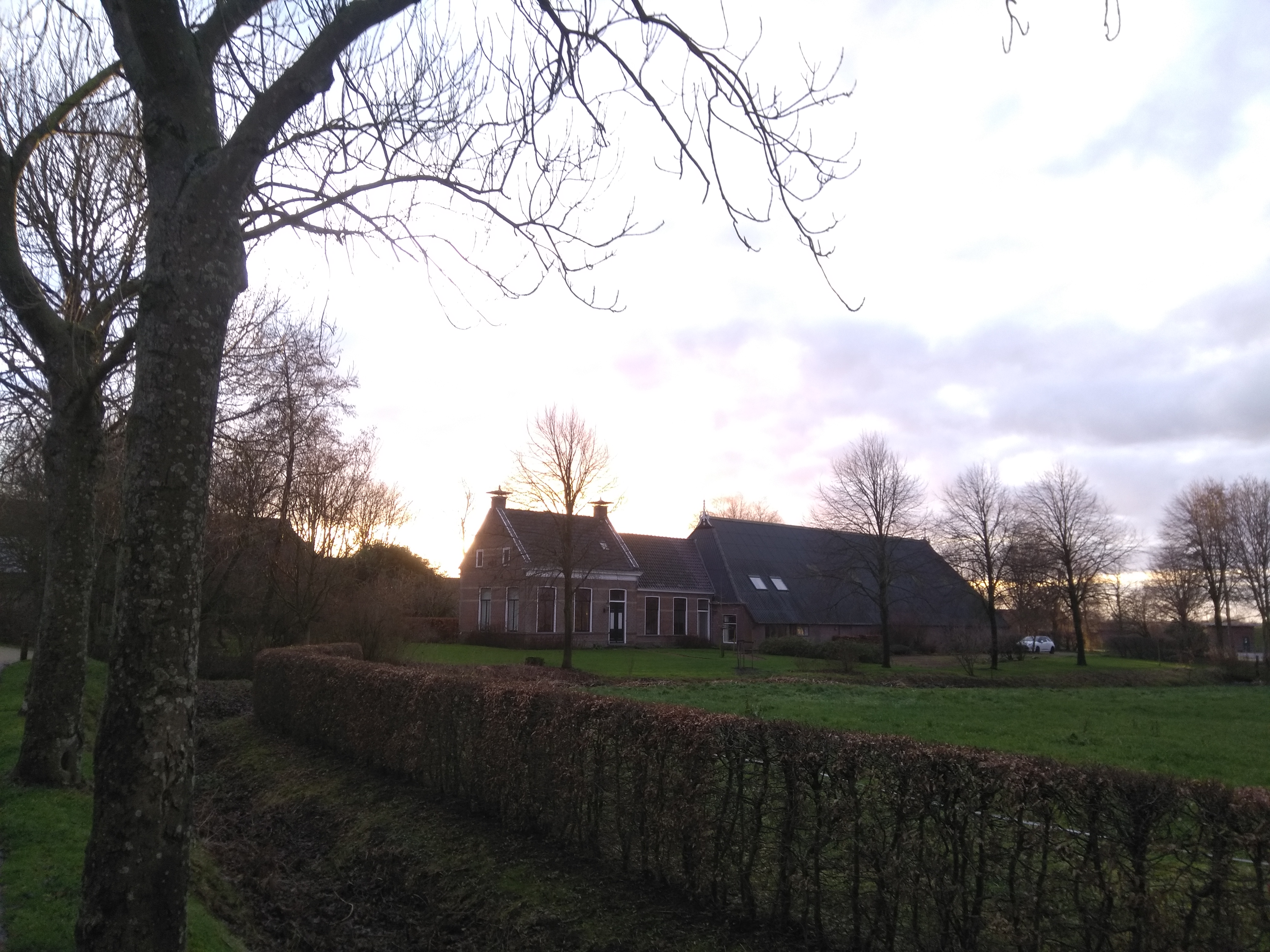
Farm Dodinga State

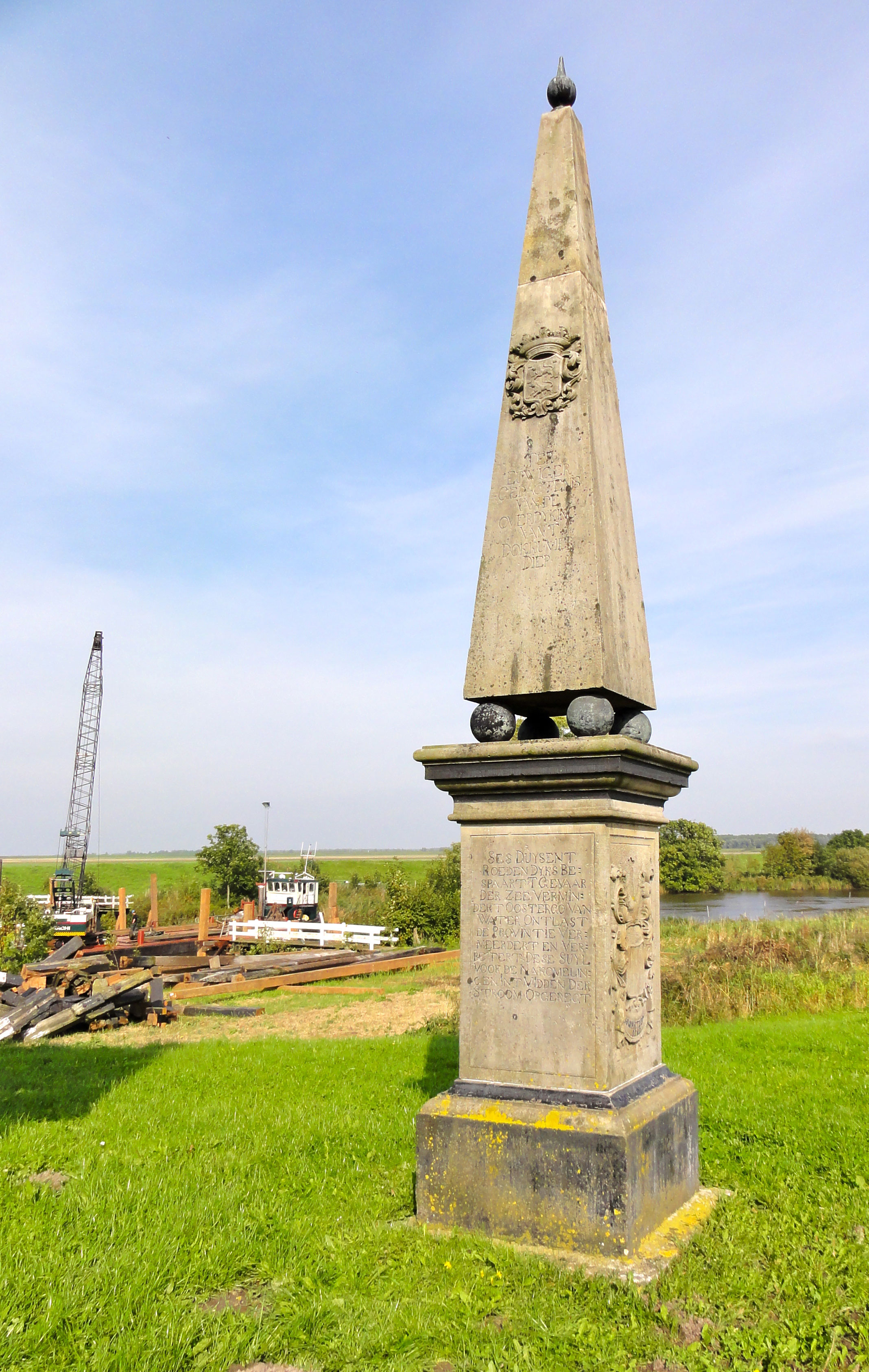
Obelisk of Ingwierrum
