= Noardeast-Fryslân =

Northeast Friesland Noardeast-Fryslân (West Frisian)
- Municipality
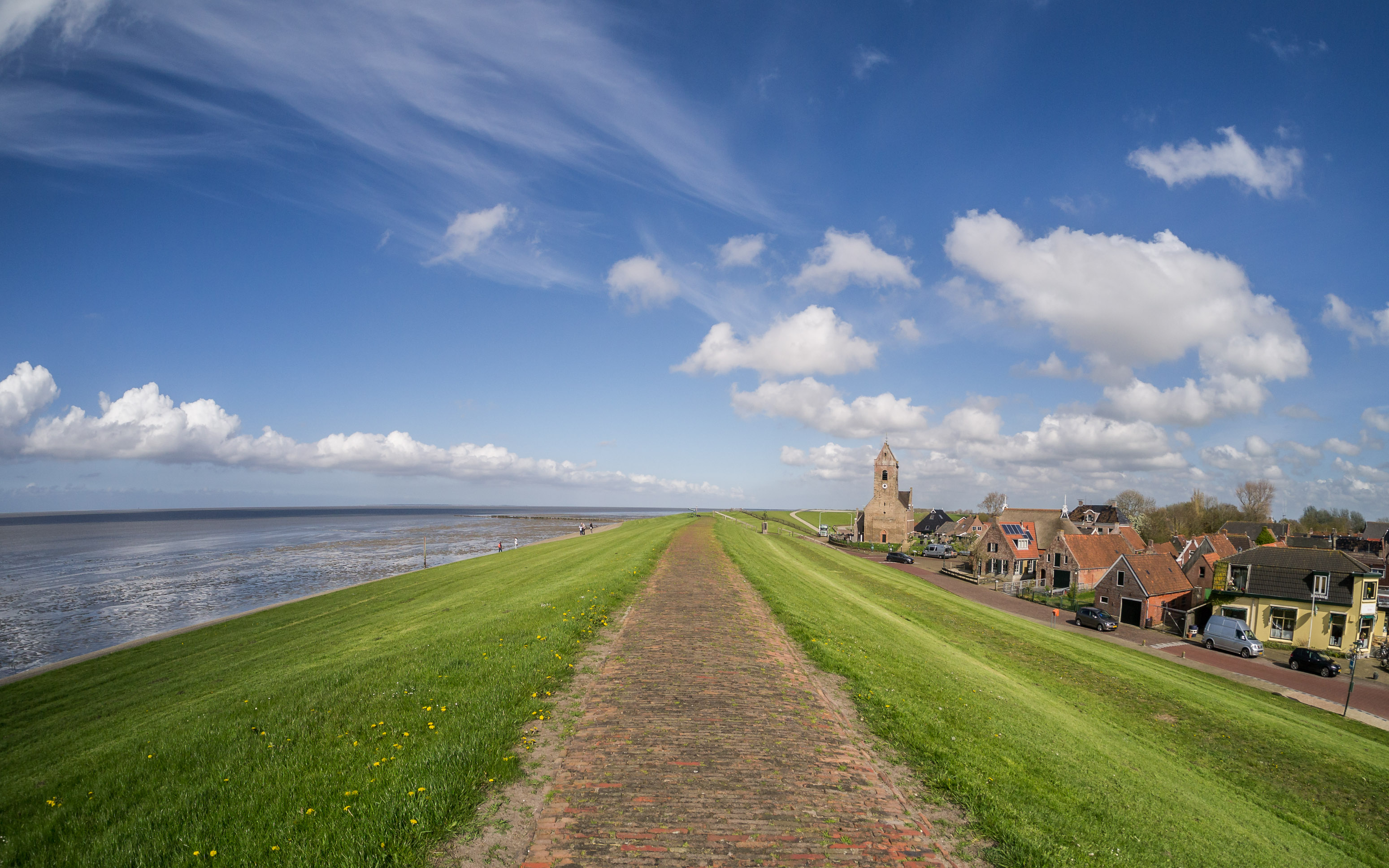
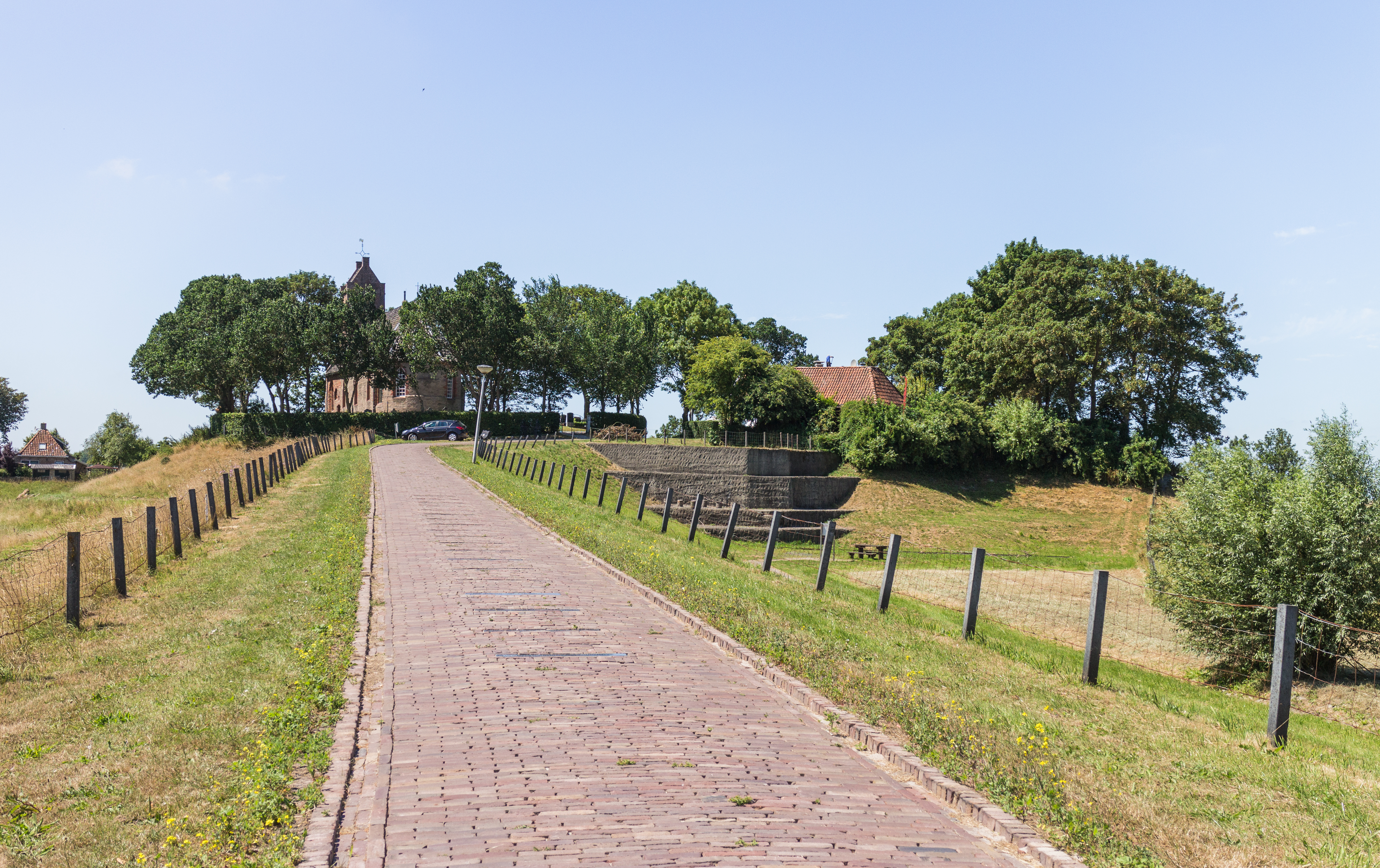
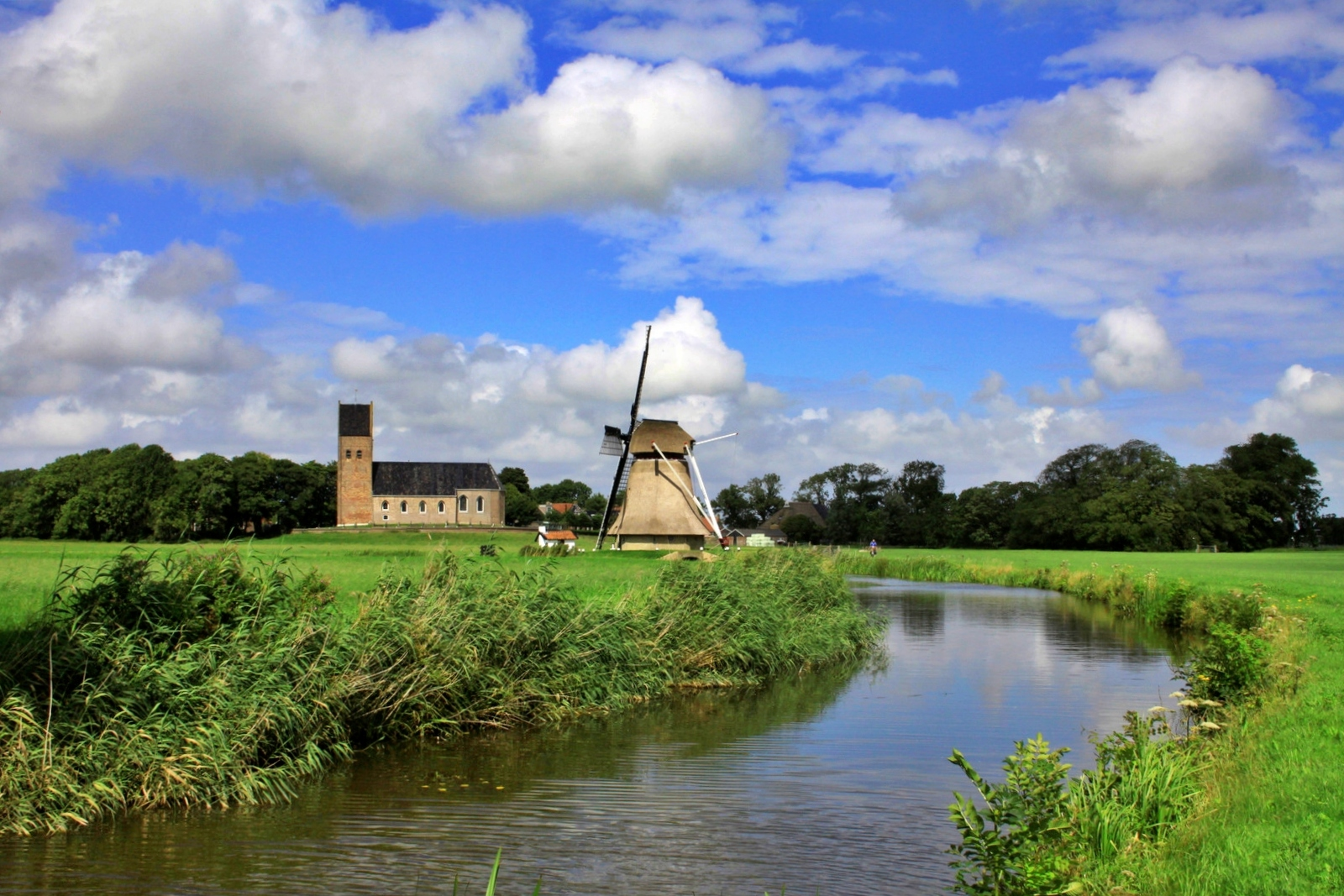
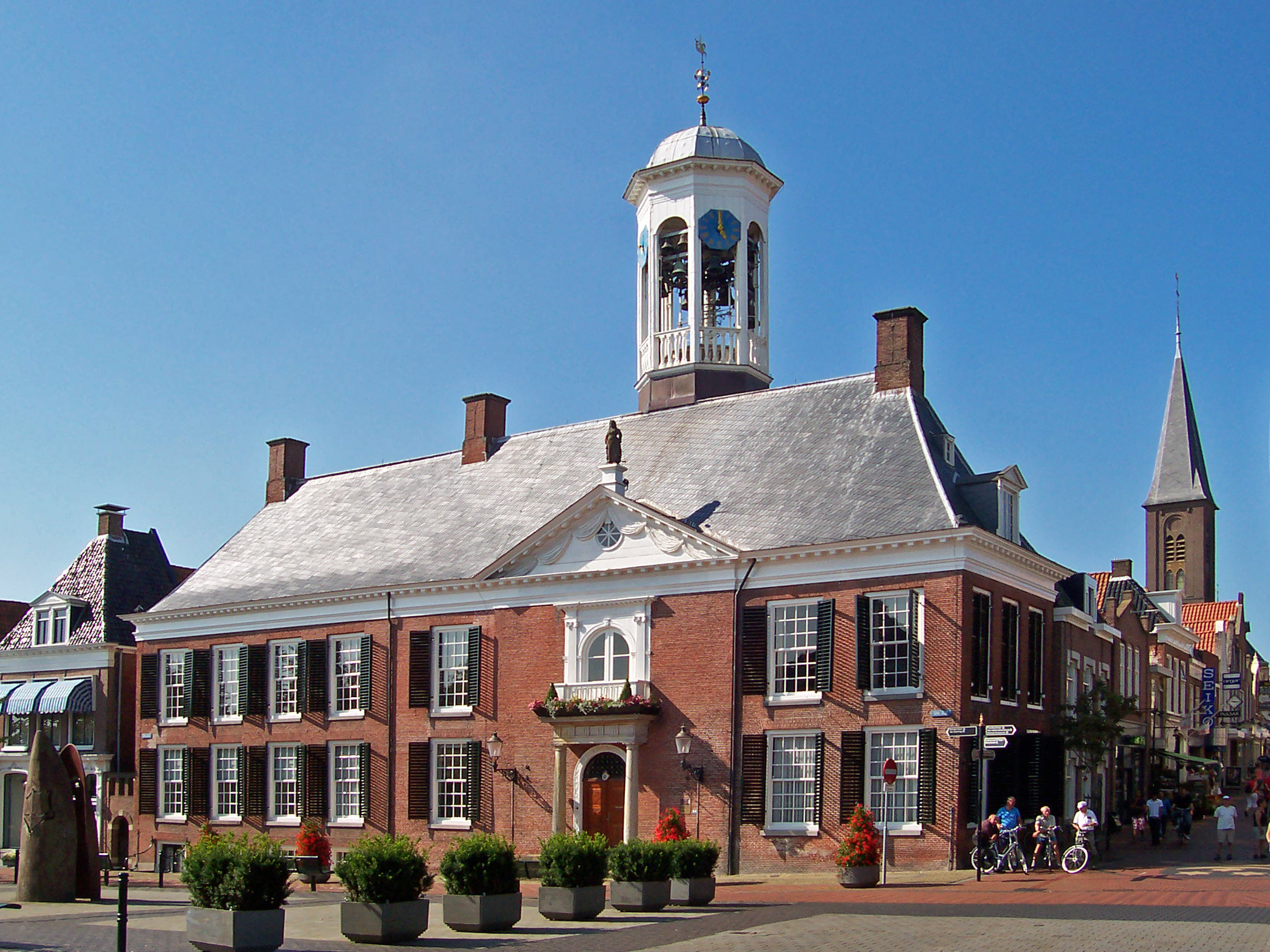
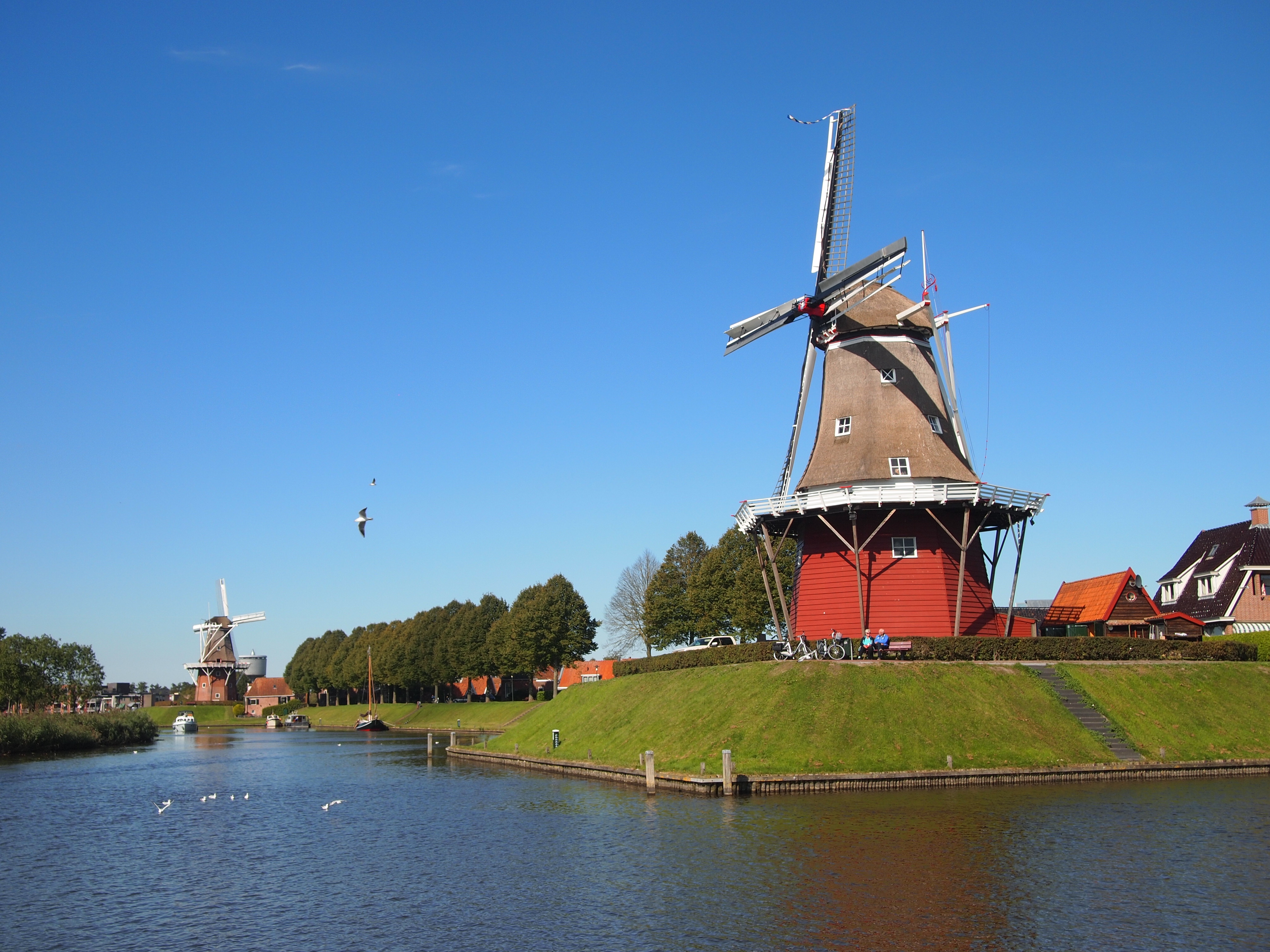
- Wierum alongside the Wadden Sea Hegebeintum Wânswert Dokkum City hall Windmills in Dokkum

- Flag Coat of arms

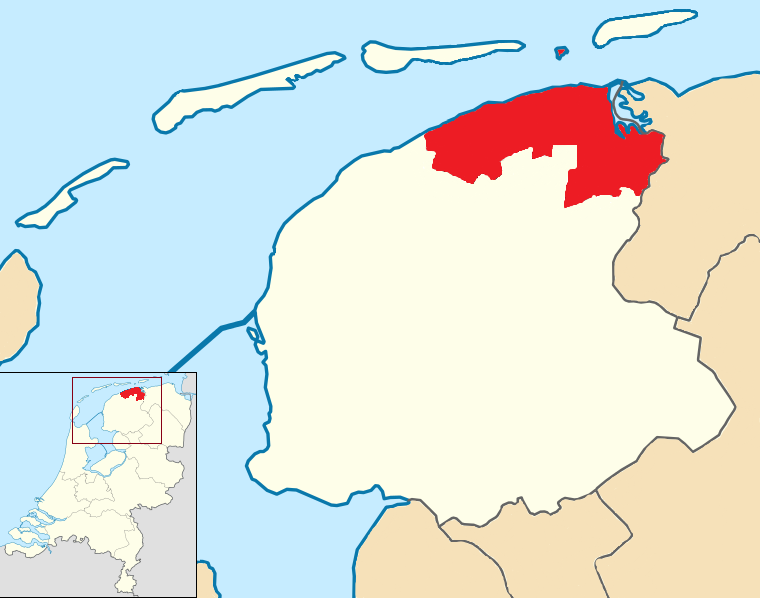
- Location in Friesland
- Coordinates: 53°20′N 6°03′E
- Country: Netherlands
- Province: Friesland
- Established: 1 January 2019

Government
  - Body: Municipal council
  - Mayor: Johannes Kramer (FNP)

Area
  - Total: 516.45 km^{2} (199.40 sq mi)
  - Land: 377.83 km^{2} (145.88 sq mi)
  - Water: 138.62 km^{2} (53.52 sq mi)

Population (January 2019)
  - Total: 45,181
- Time zone: UTC+1 (CET)
  - Summer (DST): UTC+2 (CEST)
- Postcode: Parts of 9000, 9100, 9200 and 9800 range
- Area code: 0511, 0518, 0519, 058, 0594
- Website: noardeast-fryslan.nl

Noardeast-Fryslân (West Frisian pronunciation: [noəˈtɪəst ˈfrislɔ̃ːn]; lit. 'Northeast Friesland') is a municipality of Friesland in the northern Netherlands. It was established 1 January 2019 and consists of the former municipalities of Dongeradeel, Ferwerderadiel and Kollumerland en Nieuwkruisland, all three of which dissolved on the same day.

The municipality is located in the province of Friesland on the Wadden Sea coast, in the north of the Netherlands. Noardeast-Fryslân is bordered by the municipalities of Waadhoeke, Ameland, Schiermonnikoog, Leeuwarden, Dantumadiel and the province of Groningen. The population in January 2019 was 45,181. It is Friesland's seventh-most populous municipality. The largest population centre (2018 population, 12,576) is Dokkum. The residents speak West Frisian, a Dutch Low Saxon dialect or Dutch.

Part of the municipality are the Engelsmanplaat sandbank and most of the Rif sandbank (which is shared with Schiermonnikoog for a small part).

== Etymology ==
The municipality is a part or corner in the northeast (West Frisian: noardeast) of the province of Friesland (West Frisian: Fryslân).

== Population centres ==
Dutch topographic map of the municipality of Noardeast-Fryslân, February 2024

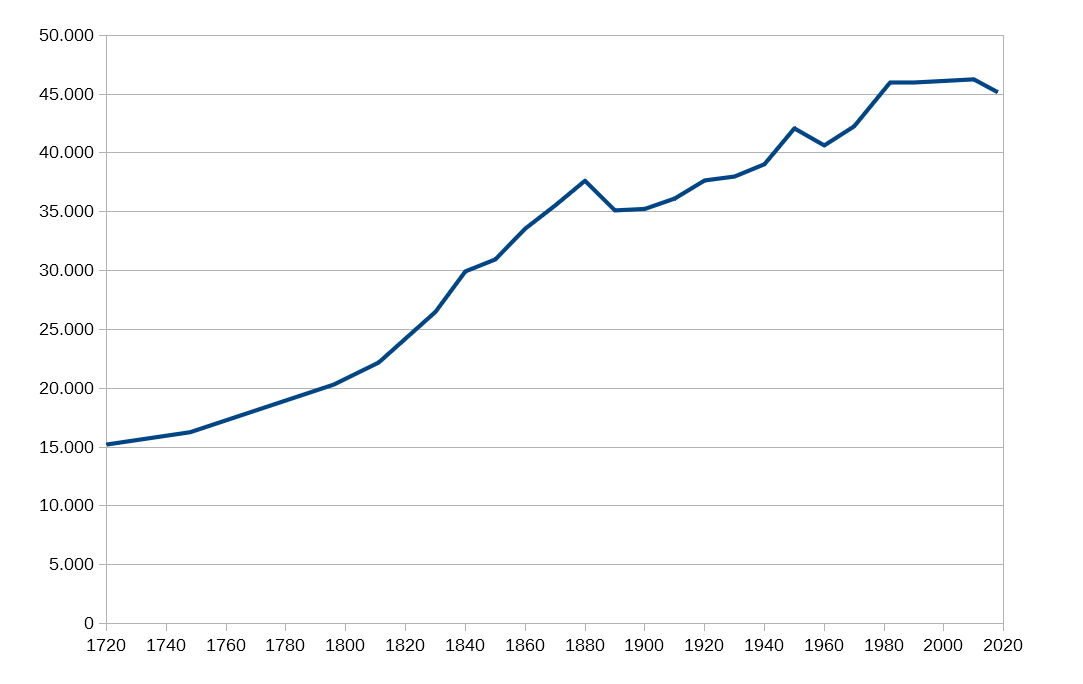
Historical population of the former municipalities 1718–2018

The municipality consists of 53 settlements of which Dokkum is the seat of government. Noardeast-Fryslân is also a region that is experiencing population decline.

Name	Population
Dokkum	12,576
Kollum	5,529
Kollumersweach	2,992
Hallum	2,751
Ferwert	1,823
Holwert	1,607
Marrum	1,464
Ternaard	1,380
Burdaard	1,158
Eanjum	1,071
Easternijtsjerk	944
Mitselwier	908
Blije	839
Ie	834
Aldwâld	832
Sweagerbosk	638
Westergeast	621
Burum (Boerum)	606
Ingwierrum	565
Munnekezijl (Muntsjesyl)	488
Kollumerpomp (De Pomp)	478
Hantum	404
Nes	376
Nijewier	366
Ljussens	348
Wierum	339
De Trieme	318
Peazens	242
Brantgum	236
Moarre	227
Raard	223
Moddergat	221
Wânswert	204
Warfstermolen (Warfstermûne)	203
Hantumhuzen	200
Eastrum	188
Reitsum	152
Aalsum (Ealsum)	125
Boarnwert	119
Feankleaster	97
Hegebeintum	90
Ginnum	89
Lichtaard	84
Foudgum	72
Jislum	72
Augsbuert-Lytsewâld	70
Hantumerútbuorren	67
Hiaure (De Lytse Jouwer)	65
De Skâns-Oostmahorn	65
Jannum	63
Wetsens	55
Jouswier	44
Waaxens (Waaksens)	35

Sources: Dongeradeel.nl, Ferwerderadiel and Kollumerland.

== Transportation ==
The ferry to Ameland departs from Holwert. Arriva runs several regional buses. Bus route 50 Leeuwarden-Dokkum-Lauwersoog connects with the departures of the ferry to Schiermonnikoog

== Notable people ==
=== Public thinking & public service ===
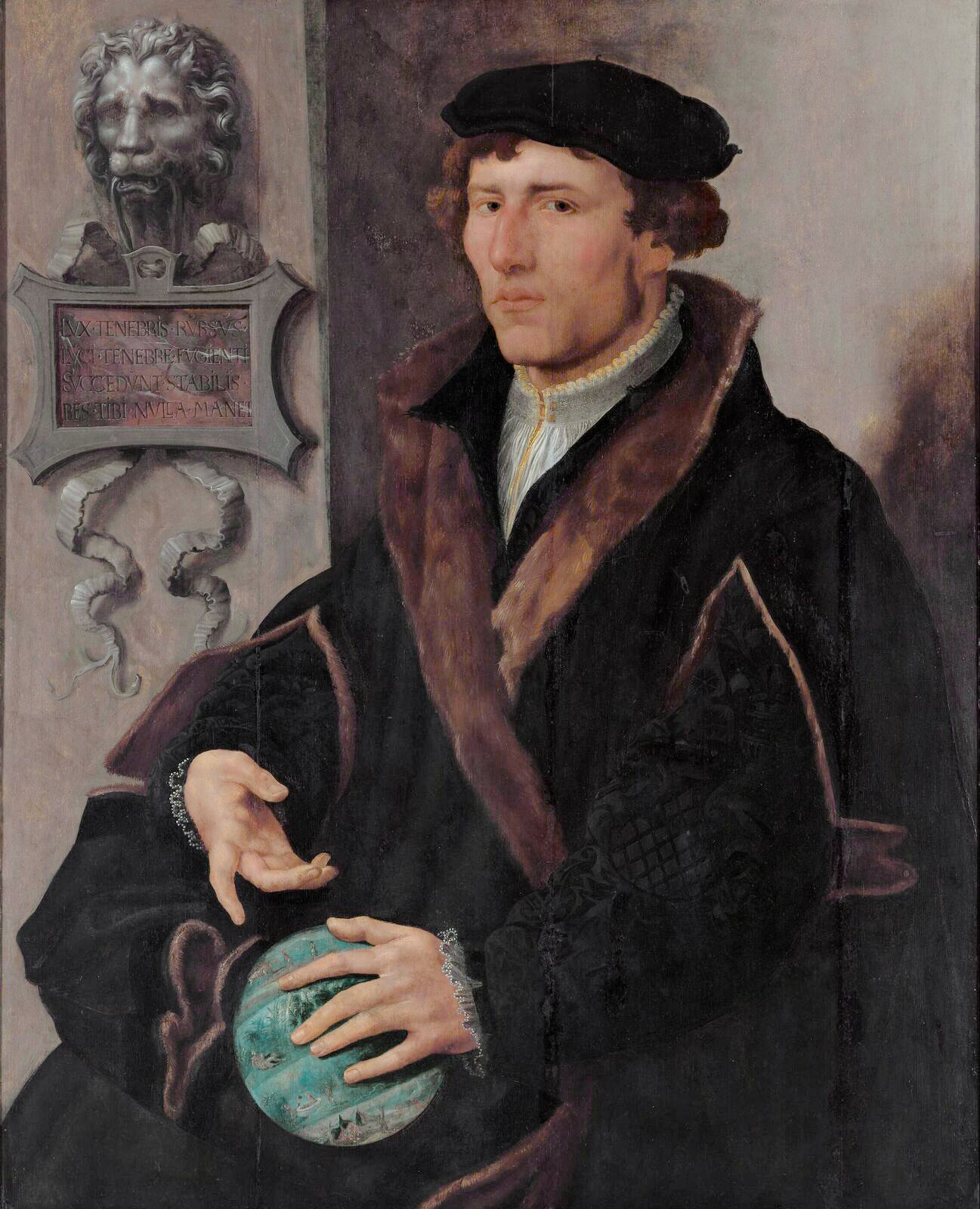
Gemma Frisius, ca.1540

- Frederick of Hallum (ca.1113 in Hallum - 1175) Premonstratensian priest and saint
- Gemma Frisius (1508 in Dokkum – 1555) a Dutch physician, mathematician, cartographer, philosopher and instrument maker
- Johannes Saeckma (1572 in Kollum – 1636) a Dutch Golden Age magistrate and judge
- Lieuwe van Aitzema (1600 in Dokkum – 1669) an historian, diplomat, bon viveur, libertine and spy
- Johannes Phocylides Holwarda (1618 in Holwert - 1651) a Frisian astronomer, physician, and philosopher
- Hans Willem van Aylva (ca.1633 in Holwert - 1691) a soldier in the Dutch Raid on the Medway
- Balthasar Bekker (1634 in Mitselwier - 1698) a minister and author about philosophy and theology
- Ulrik Huber (1636 in Dokkum – 1694) professor of law and a political philosopher
- Dooitze Eelkes Hinxt (ca.1741 in Dokkum – 1797) a Dutch navy officer in the Battle of Camperdown
- Gerardus Heymans (1857 in Ferwert – 1930) a Dutch philosopher, psychologist, a follower of psychic monism
- Sybren van Tuinen (1913–1993) a Dutch politician and public servant, Mayor of Dokkumm 1946 - 1970
- Piet Gros (born 1962 in Dokkum) a Dutch chemist and professor biomacromolecular crystallography

=== The arts ===
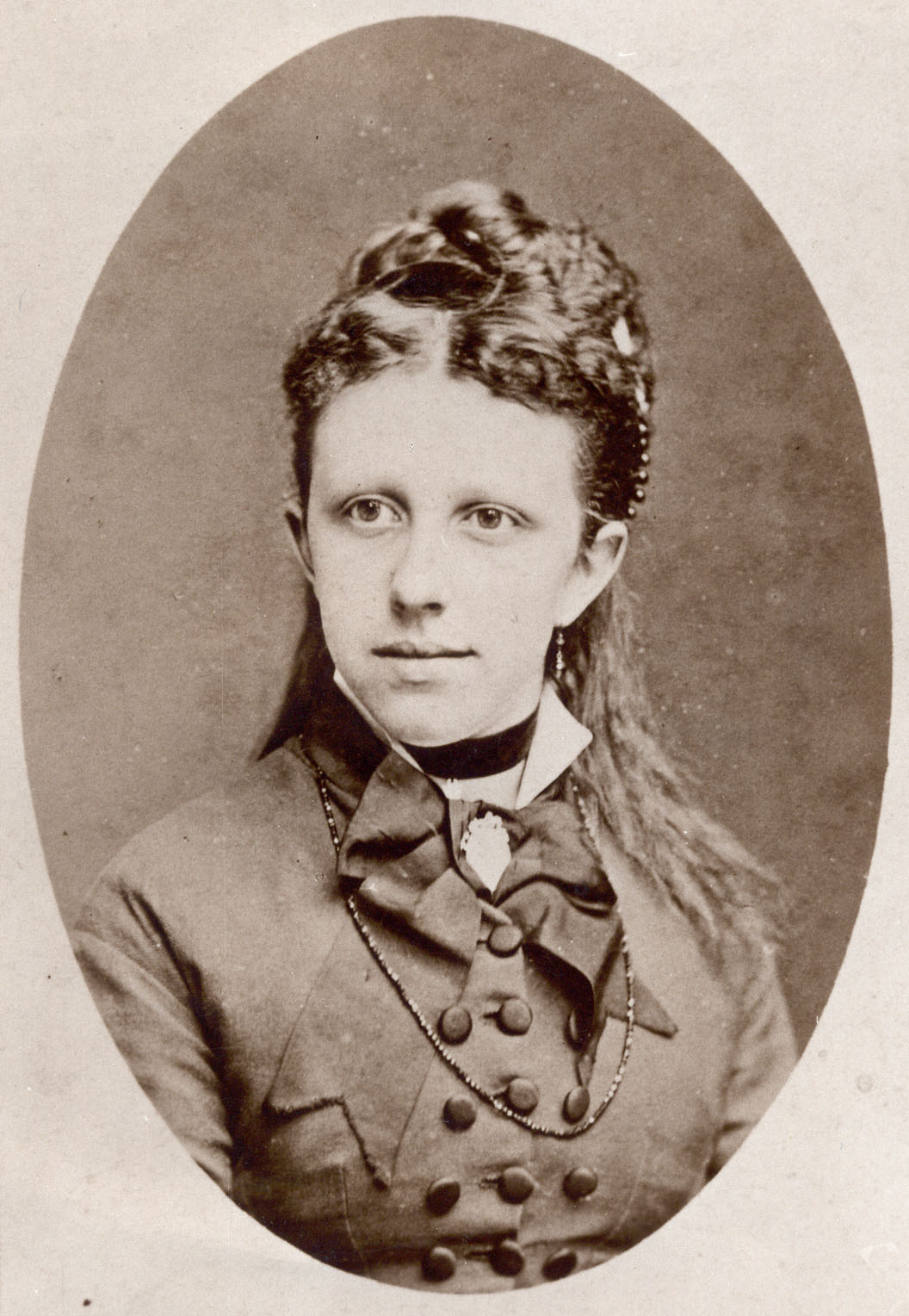
Nienke van Hichtum

- Govert Dircksz Camphuysen (1624 in Dokkum - 1672) an animal painter
- brother & sister Jacob Folkema (1692 in Dokkum – 1767) & Anna Folkema (1695 in Dokkum – 1768) engravers
- Bernard Accama (1697 in Burum – 1756) a Dutch historical and portrait painter
- Nienke van Hichtum (1860 in Nes – 1939) a Frisian Dutch children's author
- Watse Cuperus (1891 in Blije – 1966) a Dutch journalist, writer and translator
- Meindert DeJong (1906 in Wierum - 1991) an American writer of children's books
- Sipke Jan Bousema (born 1976 in Dokkum) a Dutch presenter and actor

=== Sport ===
- Lou Dijkstra (1909 in Peazens – 1964) a Dutch speed skater, competed in the 1936 Winter Olympics
- Klaas de Boer (born 1942 in Kollum) a retired U.S. soccer player and coach
- Jan Posthuma (born 1963 in Dokkum) a retired volleyball player, team silver medallist at the 1992 Summer Olympics and team gold medallist at the 1996 Summer Olympics
