= Jannum =

Jannum Janum
- Village
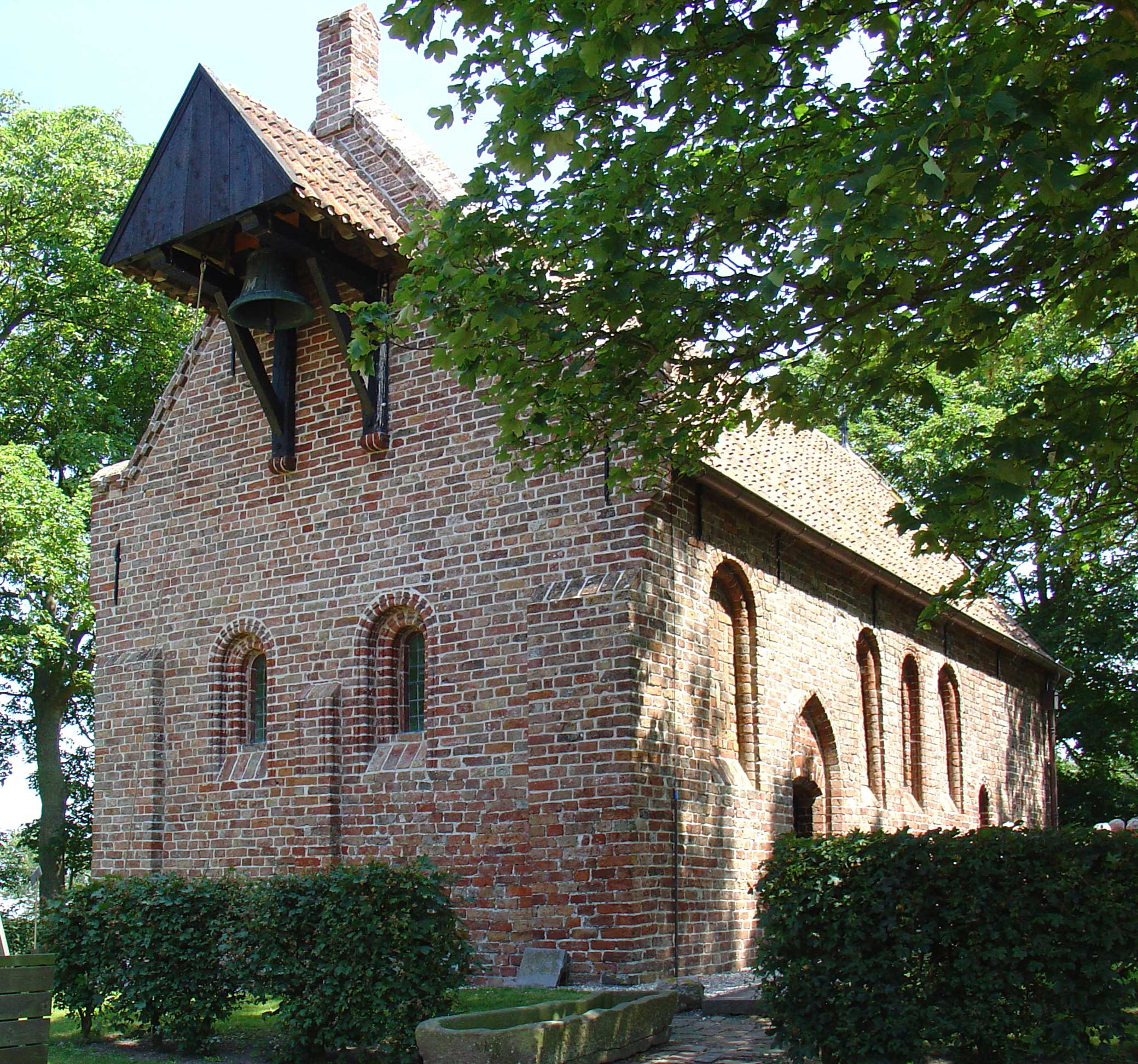
- Jannum church

- Flag

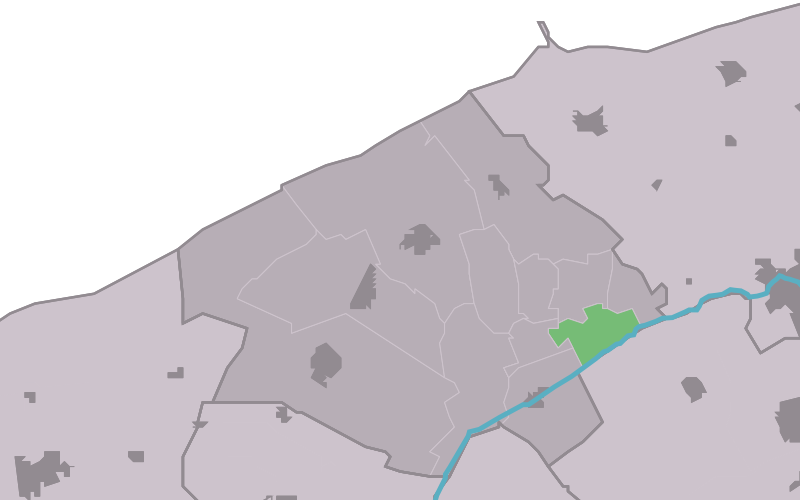
- Location in the former Ferwerderadiel municipality

- Location in the Netherlands Jannum (Netherlands)
- Country: Netherlands
- Province: Friesland
- Municipality: Noardeast-Fryslân

Area
  - Total: 2.59 km^{2} (1.00 sq mi)
- Elevation: 0.7 m (2.3 ft)

Population (2021)
  - Total: 40
  - Density: 15/km^{2} (40/sq mi)
- Time zone: UTC+1 (CET)
  - Summer (DST): UTC+2 (CEST)
- Postal code: 9107
- Dialing code: 0519

Jannum (Dutch: Janum) is a small village in Noardeast-Fryslân municipality in the province of Friesland, the Netherlands. It had a population of around 63 in January 2017. Before 2019, the village was part of the Ferwerderadiel municipality.

The village was first mentioned in 1506 as Jawnum. The etymology is unclear. The Dutch Reformed Church is from the 14th century and has 13th century elements. In 1840, Jannum was home to 97 people.

== Gallery ==
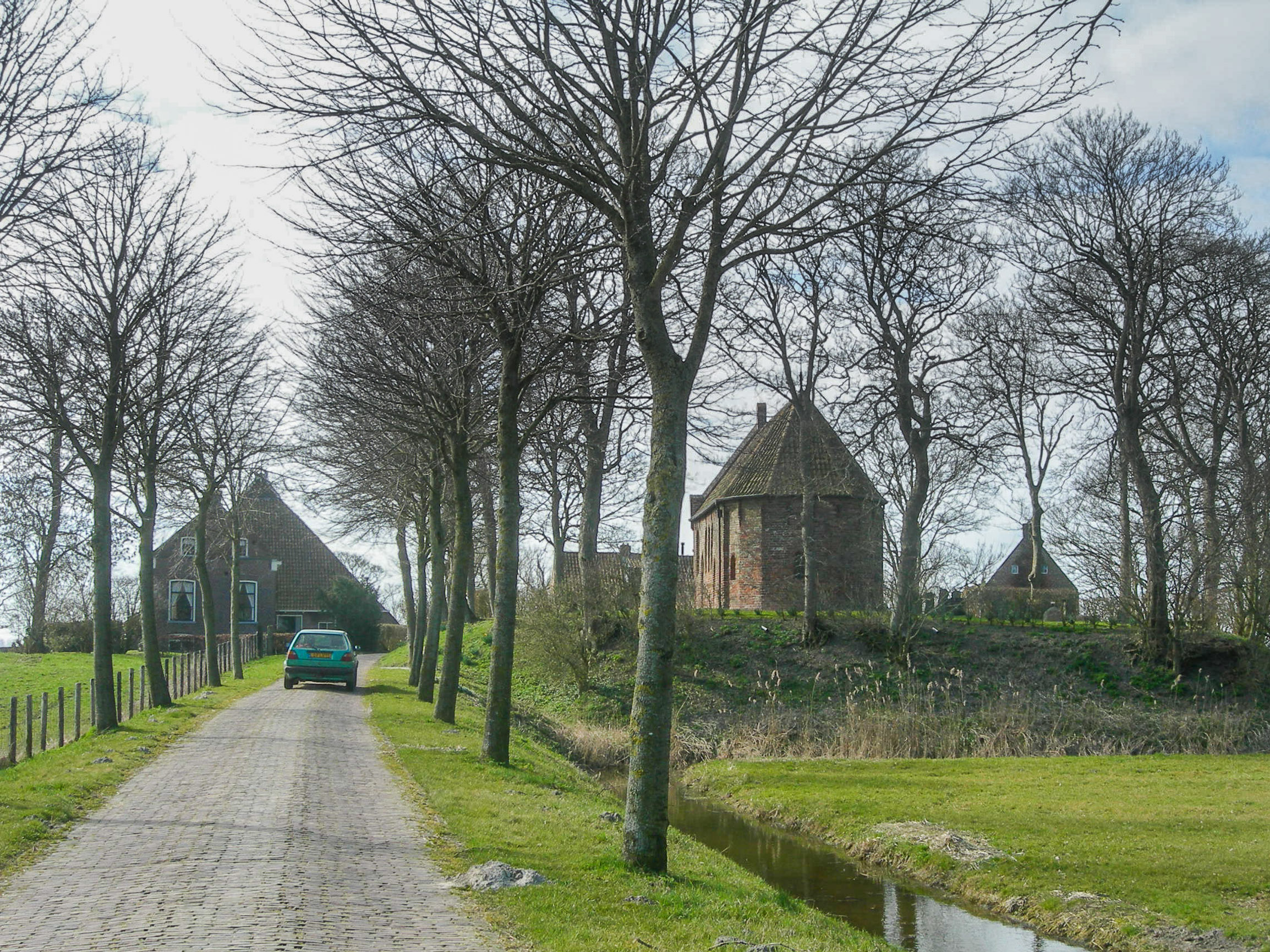
View on Jannum

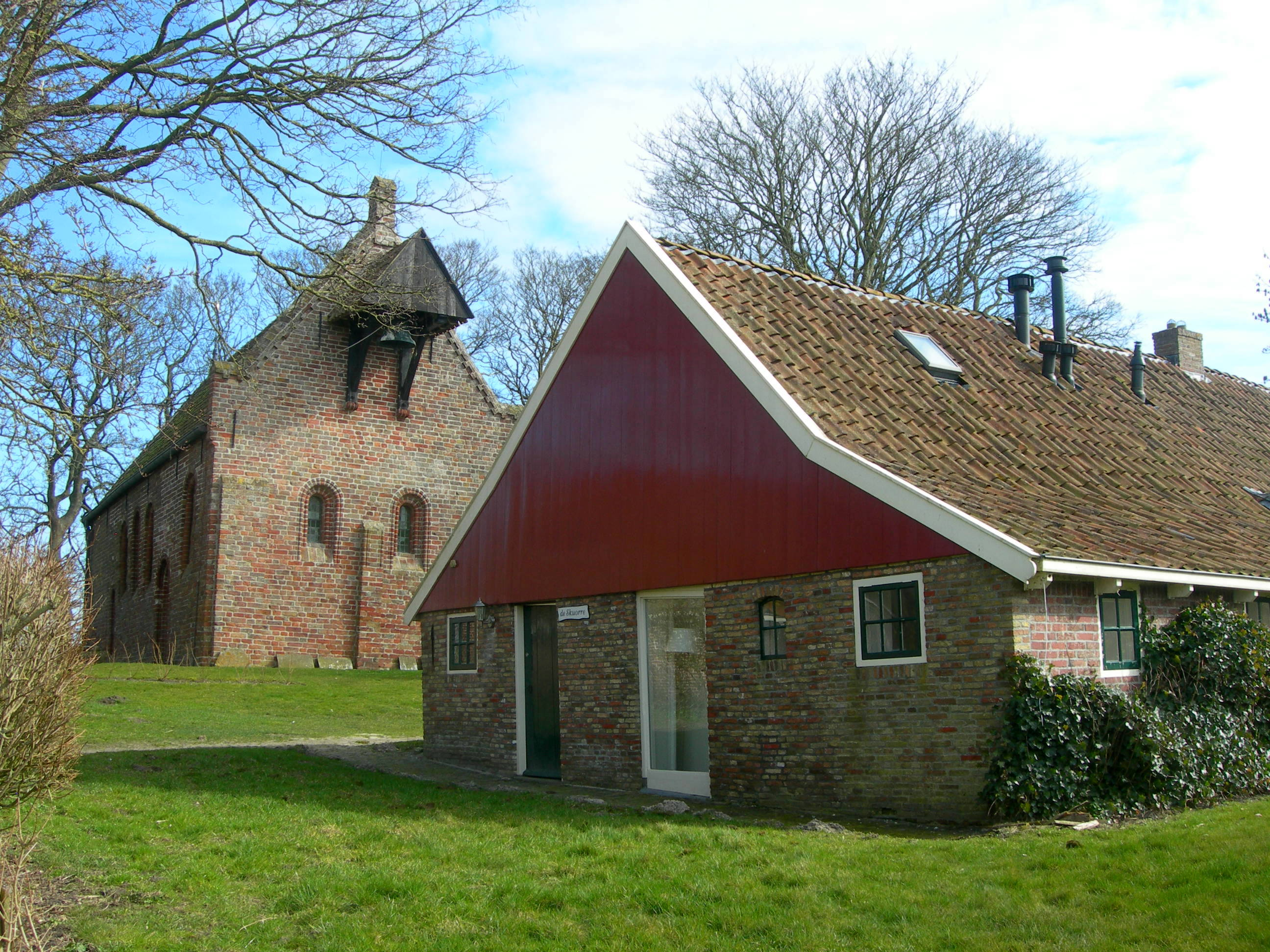
House in Jannum

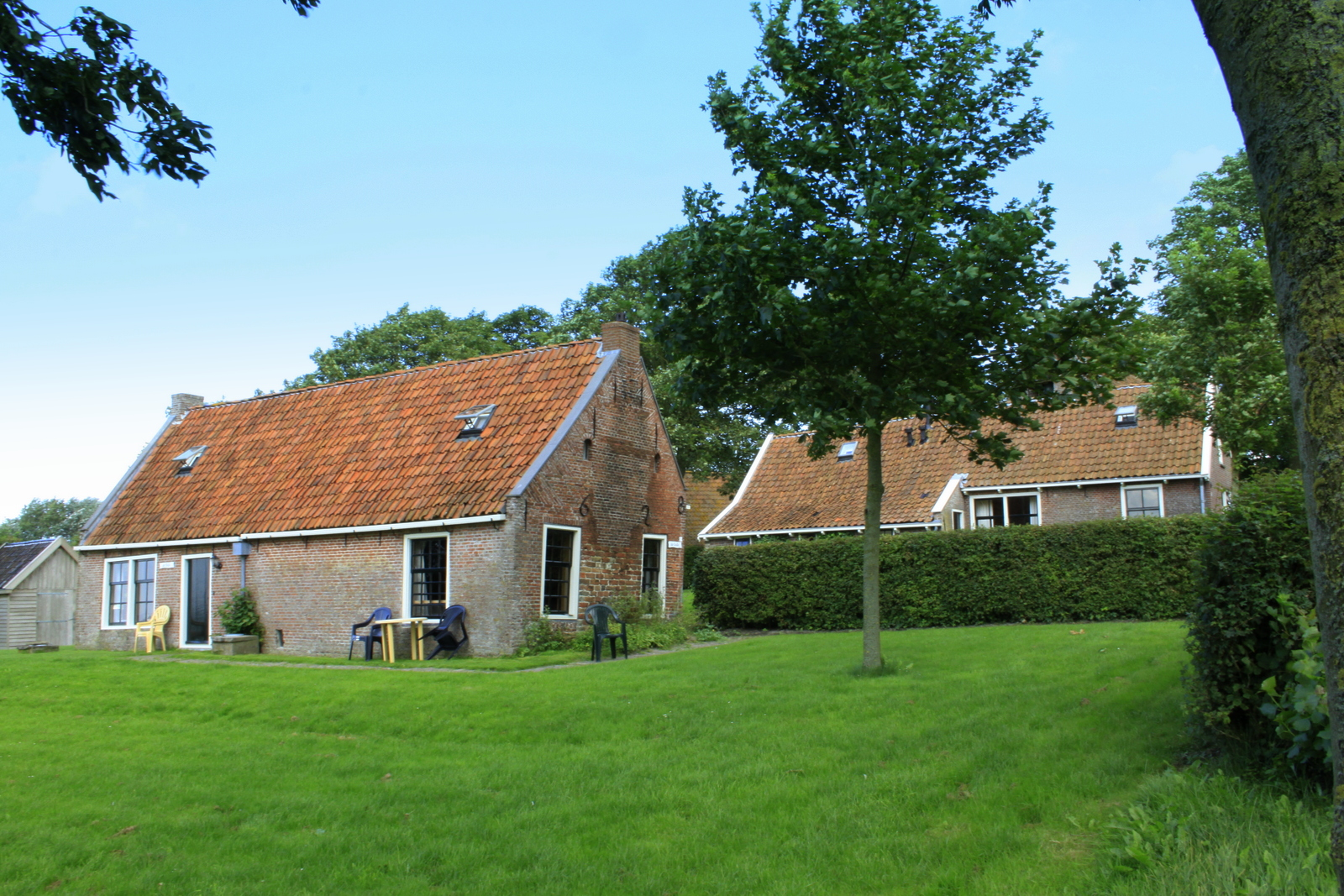
House in Jannum
