= Ginnum =

Genum Ginnum
- Village
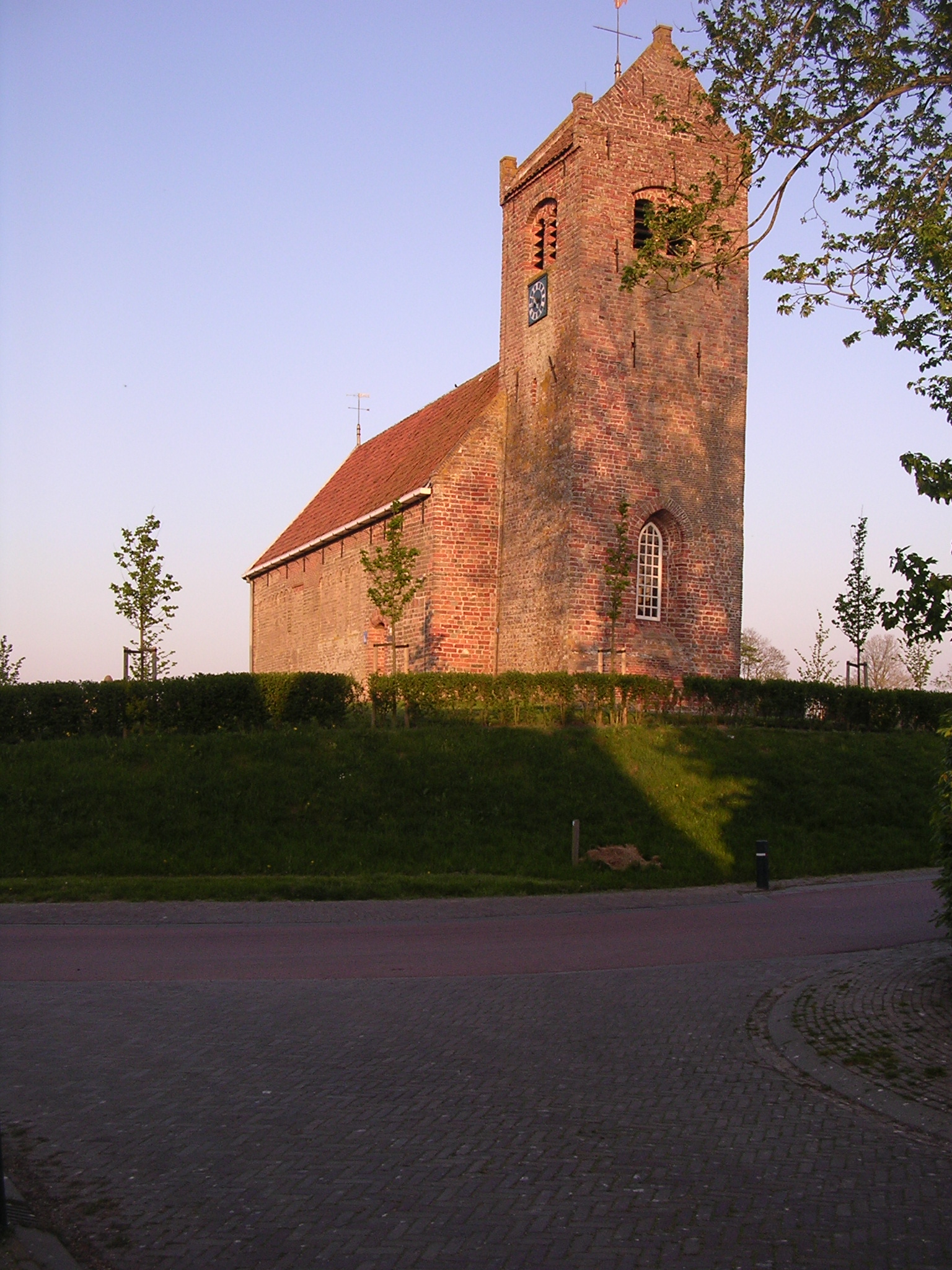
- Ginnum church

- Flag

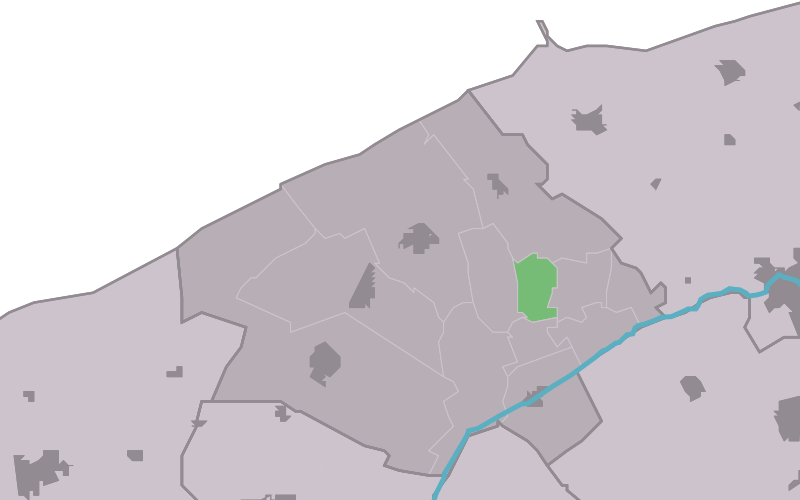
- Location in the former Ferwerderadiel municipality

- Location in the Netherlands Genum (Netherlands)
- Country: Netherlands
- Province: Friesland
- Municipality: Noardeast-Fryslân

Area
  - Total: 1.98 km^{2} (0.76 sq mi)
- Elevation: 0.3 m (0.98 ft)

Population (2021)
  - Total: 90
  - Density: 45/km^{2} (120/sq mi)
- Time zone: UTC+1 (CET)
  - Summer (DST): UTC+2 (CEST)
- Postal code: 9174
- Dialing code: 0519

Ginnum (Dutch: Genum) is a small village in Noardeast-Fryslân in the province of Friesland, the Netherlands. It had a population of around 87 in January 2017. Before 2019, the village was part of the Ferwerderadiel municipality.

The village was first mentioned in 1397 as Ghenim, and means "settlement of the people of Gene (person)." The Dutch Reformed church dates from the 12th century and was enlarged in the 13th century. The tower dates from the 15th century. In 1840, Ginnum was home to 124 people.

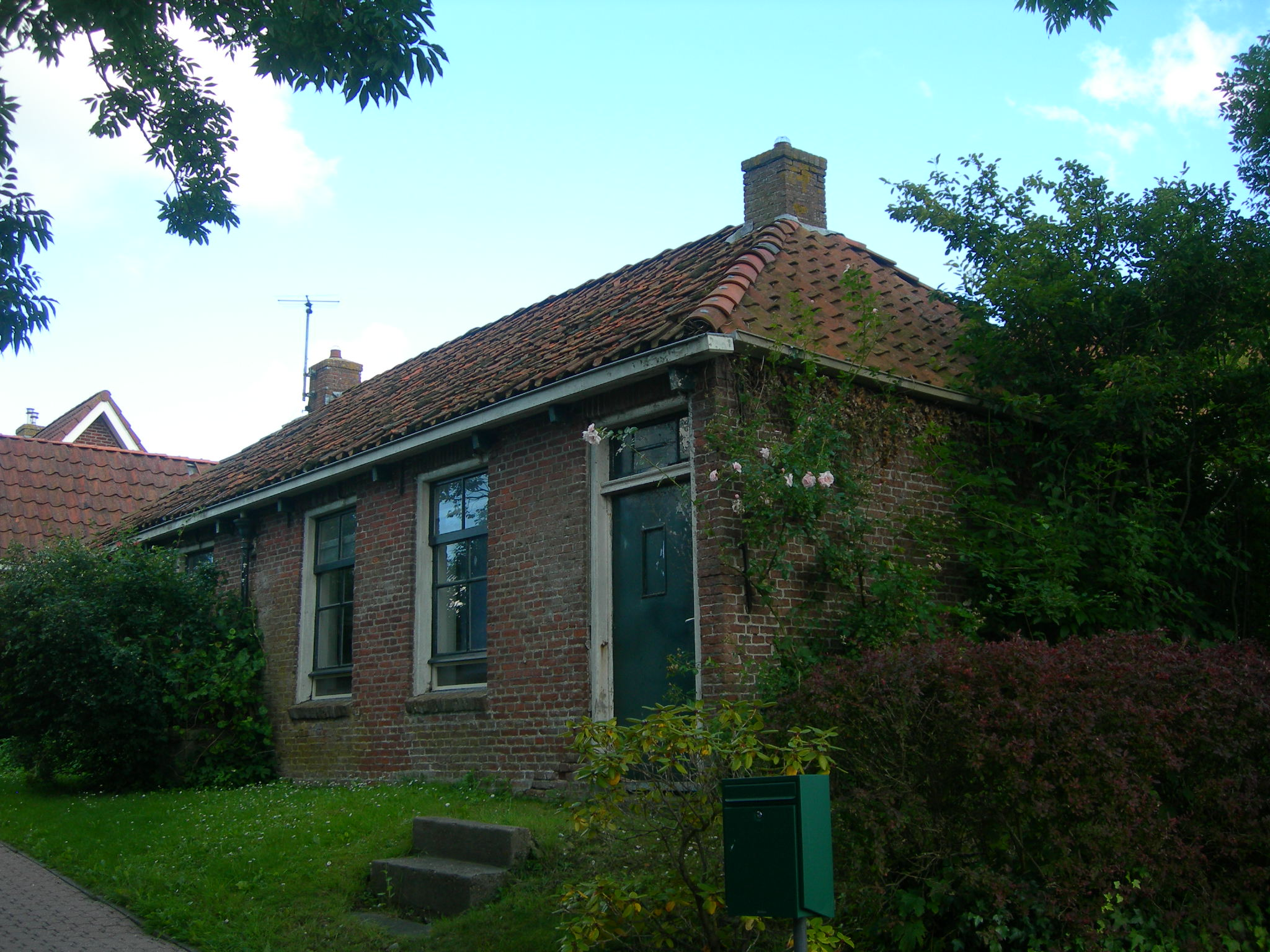
Little house near the church
