= Hantumerútbuorren =

- Hamlet
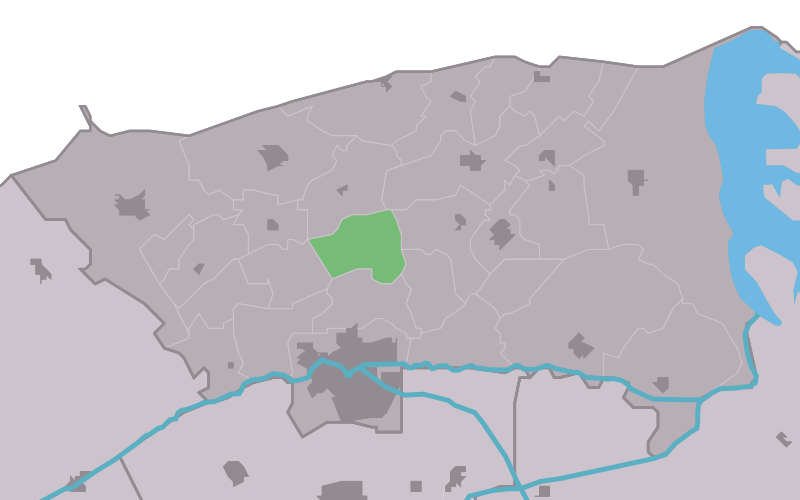
- Location in the former Dongeradeel municipality

- Location in the Netherlands Hantumerútbuorren (Netherlands)
- Country: Netherlands
- Province: Friesland
- Municipality: Noardeast-Fryslân

Area
  - Total: 4.08 km^{2} (1.58 sq mi)
- Elevation: 0.3 m (0.98 ft)

Population (2021)
  - Total: 70
  - Density: 17/km^{2} (44/sq mi)
- Time zone: UTC+1 (CET)
  - Summer (DST): UTC+2 (CEST)
- Postal code: 9146
- Dialing code: 0519

Hantumerútbuorren (Dutch: Hantumeruitburen) is a hamlet in Noardeast-Fryslân in the province of Friesland, the Netherlands. It had a population of around 67 as of January 2017. Before 2019, the village was part of the Dongeradeel municipality.

The village was first mentioned in 1511 as Berum, and means "neighbourhood near Hantum". In 1840, it was home to 109 people.

The village's official name was changed from Hantumeruitburen to Hantumerútbuorren in 2023.
