= Foudgum =

- Village
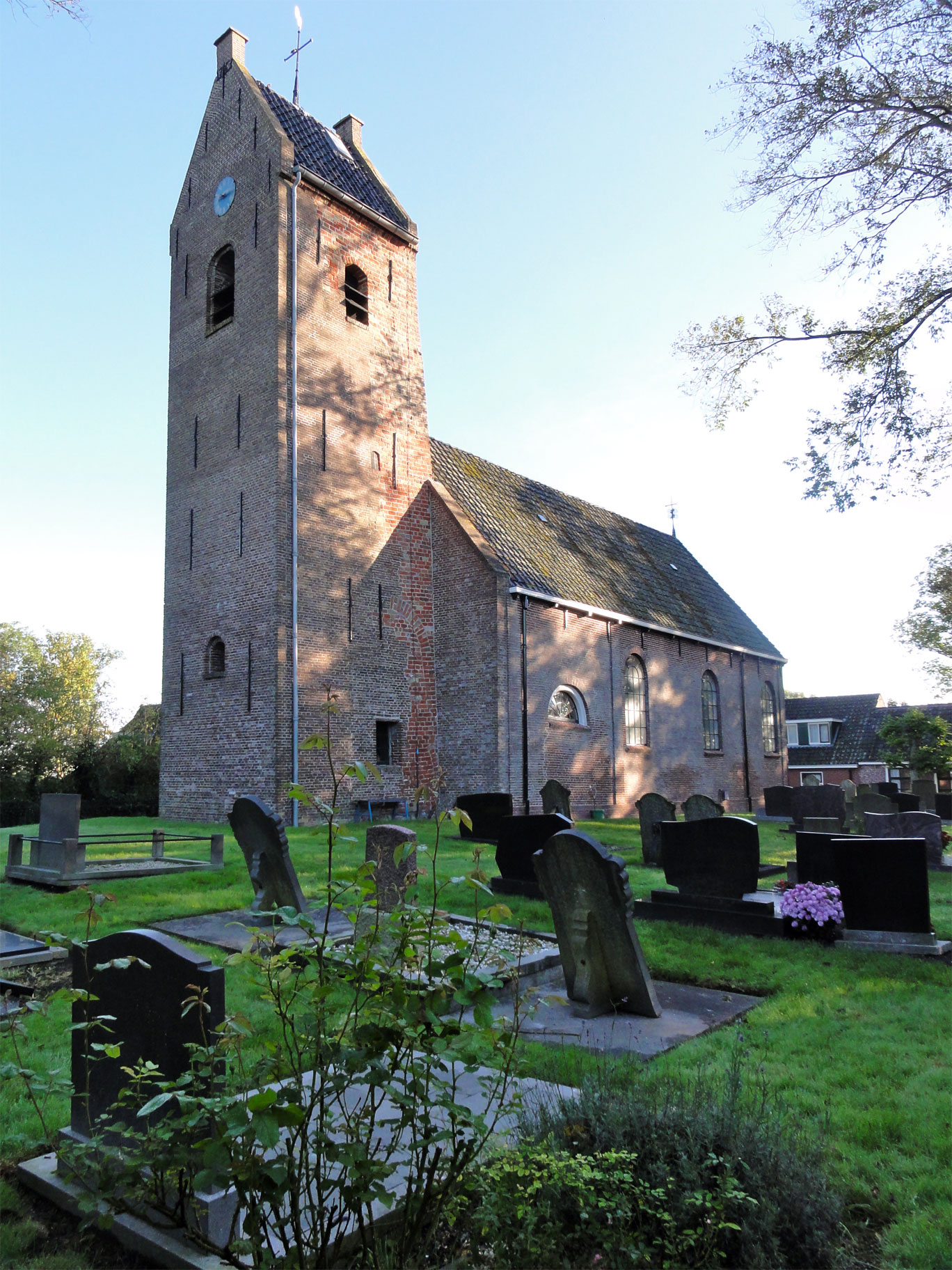
- St Mary's church

- Flag Coat of arms

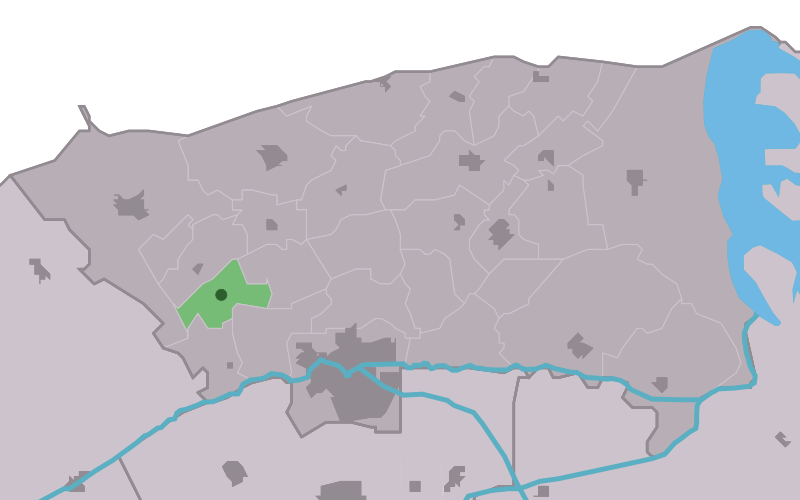
- Location in the former Dongeradeel municipality

- Location in the Netherlands Foudgum (Netherlands)
- Country: Netherlands
- Province: Friesland
- Municipality: Noardeast-Fryslân

Area
  - Total: 3.39 km^{2} (1.31 sq mi)
- Elevation: 0.3 m (0.98 ft)

Population (2021)
  - Total: 75
  - Density: 22/km^{2} (57/sq mi)
- Time zone: UTC+1 (CET)
  - Summer (DST): UTC+2 (CEST)
- Postal code: 9154
- Dialing code: 0519

Foudgum is a small village in Noardeast-Fryslân in the province of Friesland, Netherlands. It had a population of around 72 as of January 2017. Before 2019, the village was part of the Dongeradeel municipality.

The village was first mentioned in 944 as Fotdenheim. The etymology is unclear. Foudgum is a terp (artificial living mound) village which is relatively in its original shape. There four paths leading to the church which is located on top of the mound. During the 19th century, part of the terp was excavated. The original church was demolished in the 19th century and replaced in 1808. It's currently in use a wedding location. In 1840, Foudgum was home to 112 people.

== Gallery ==
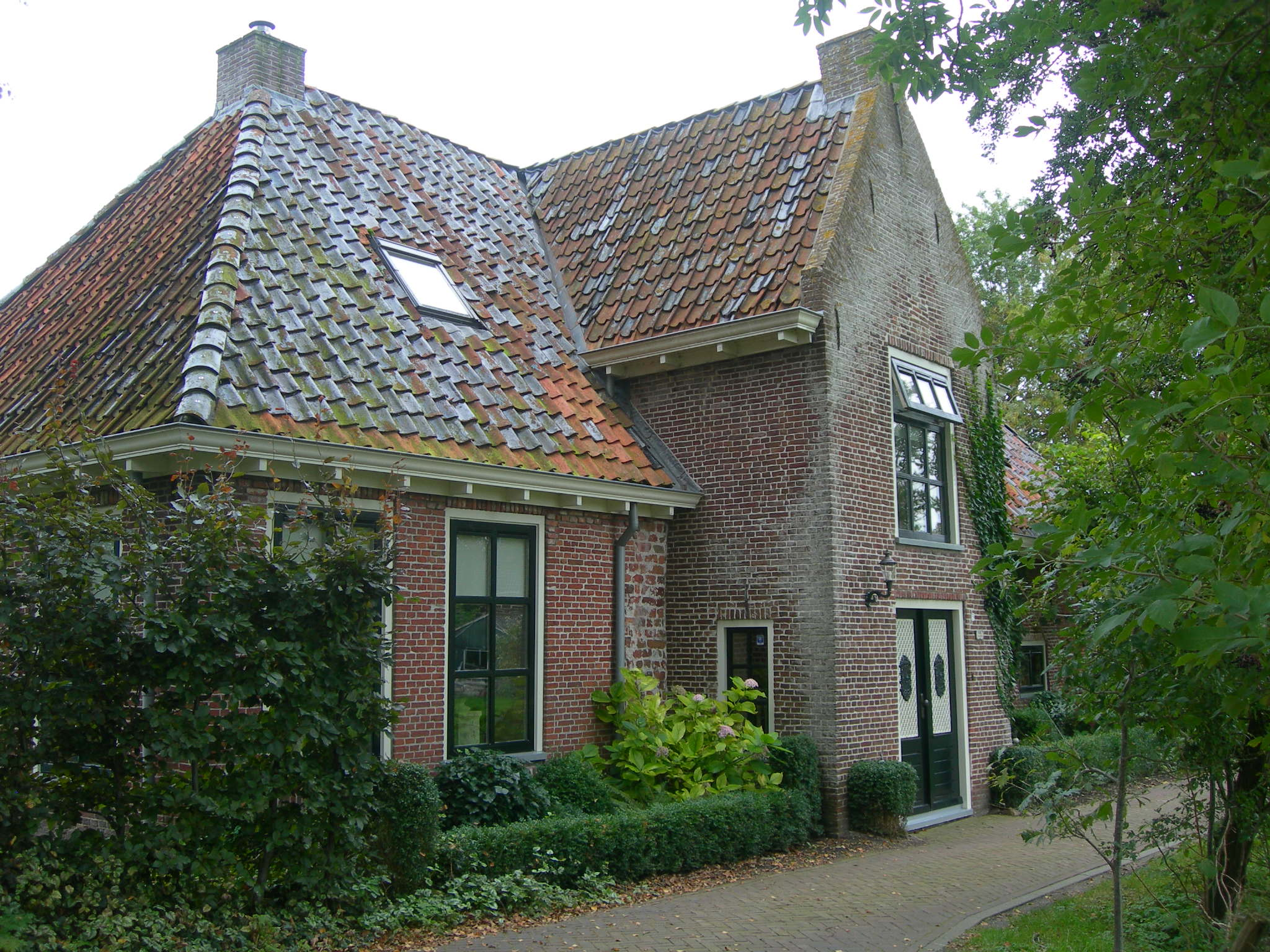
Clergy house

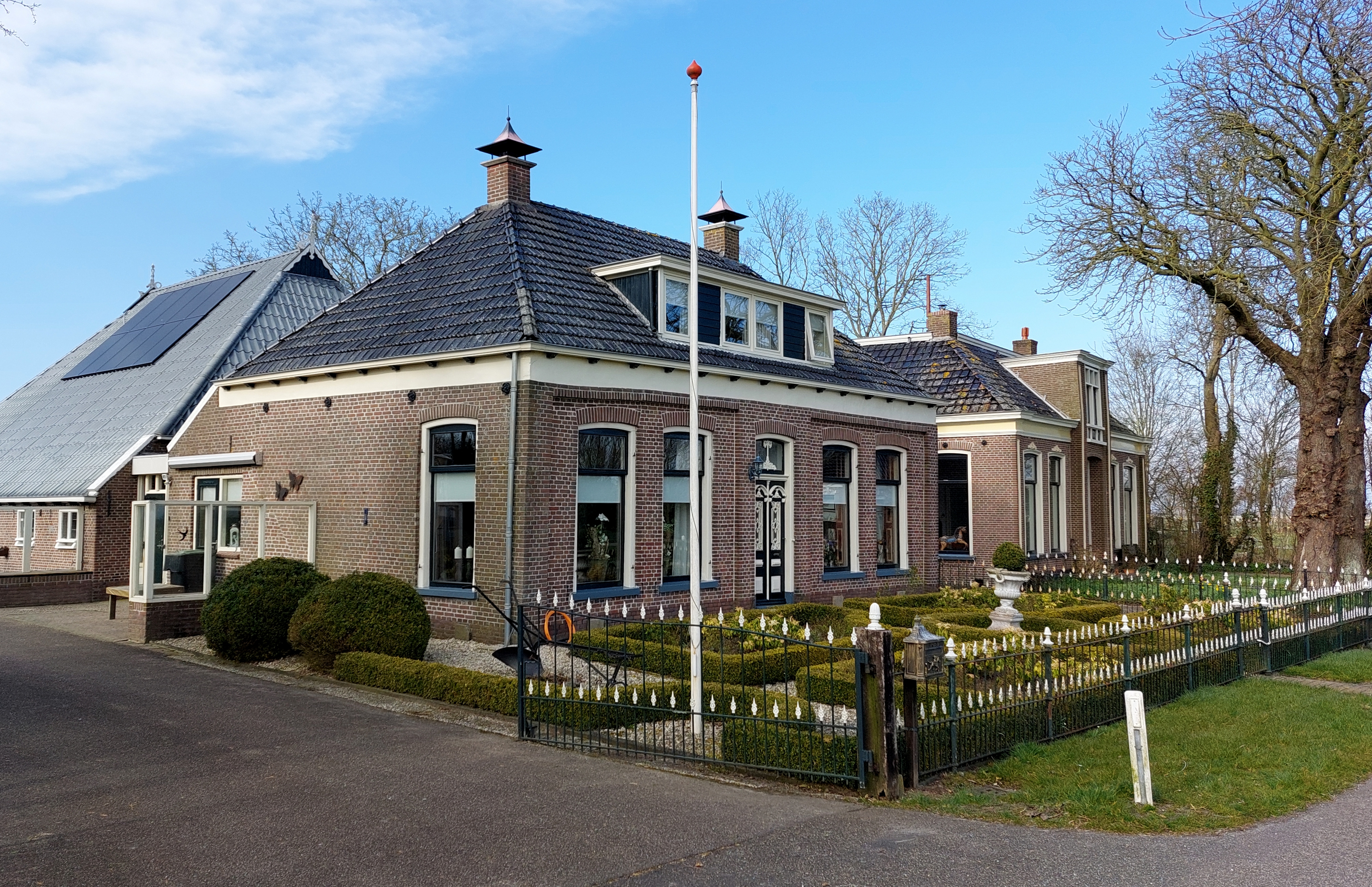
Farms around the terp

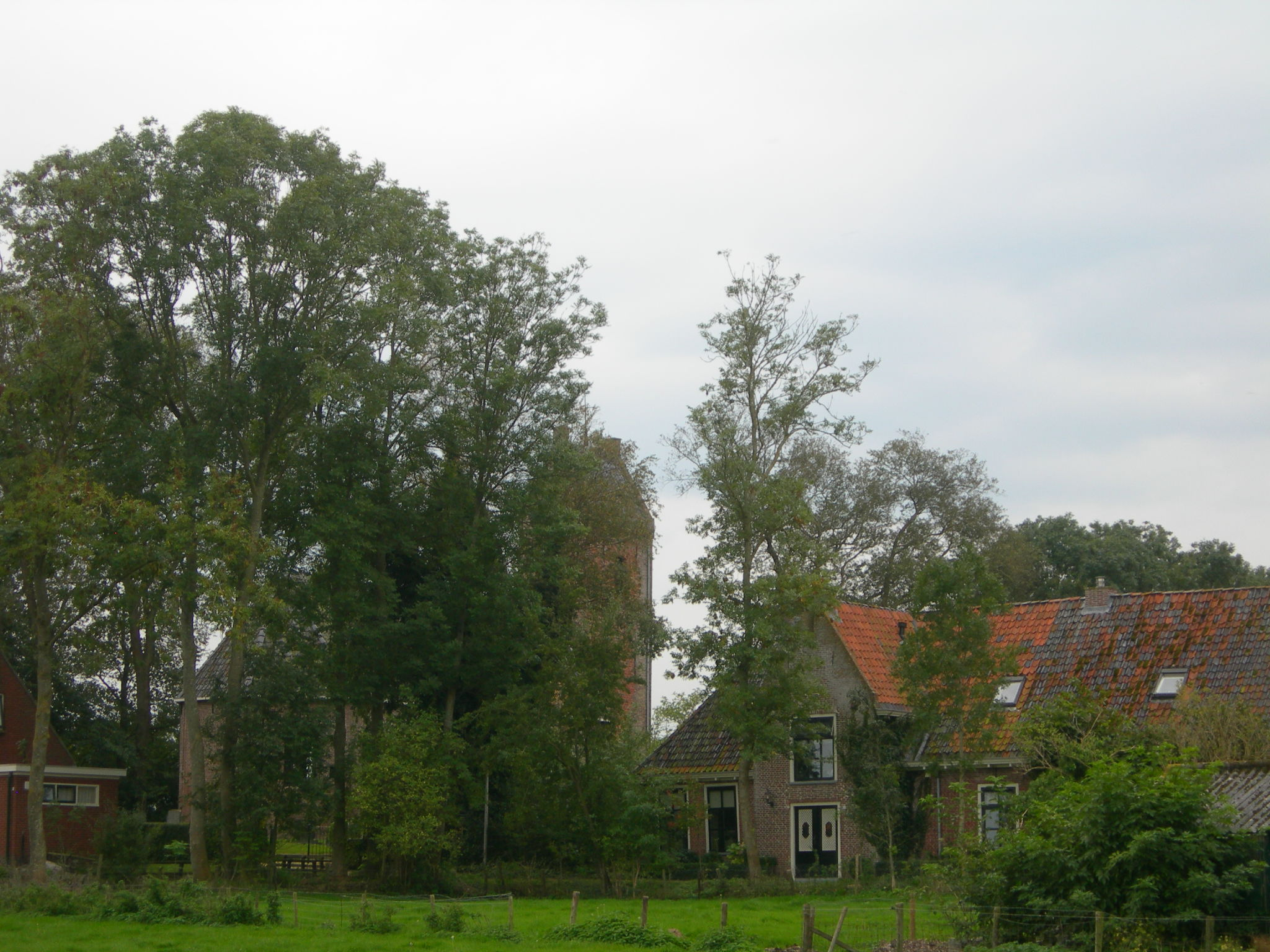
View on Foudgum
