= Lichtaard =

- Village
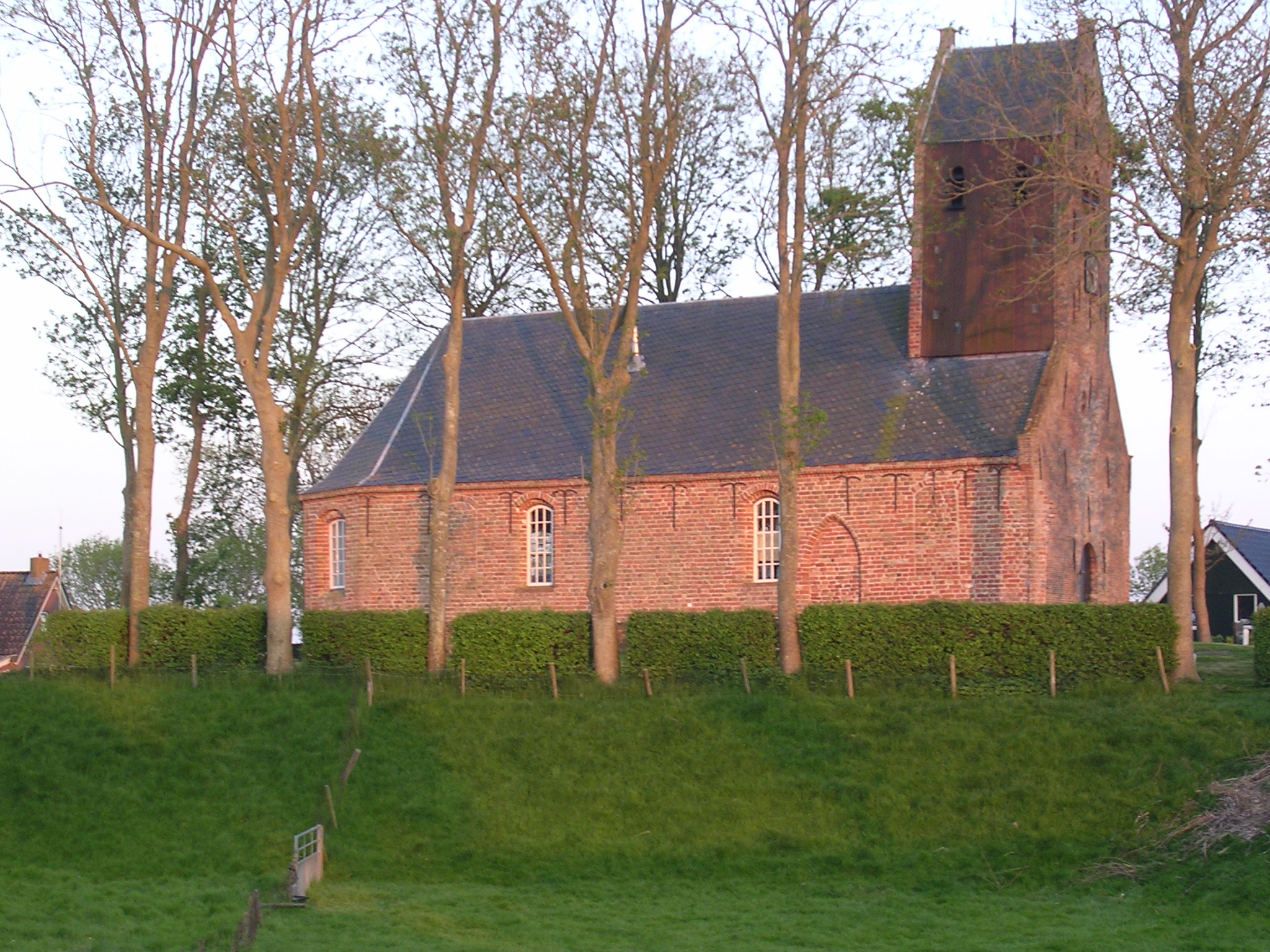
- St Gertrude's church

- Flag

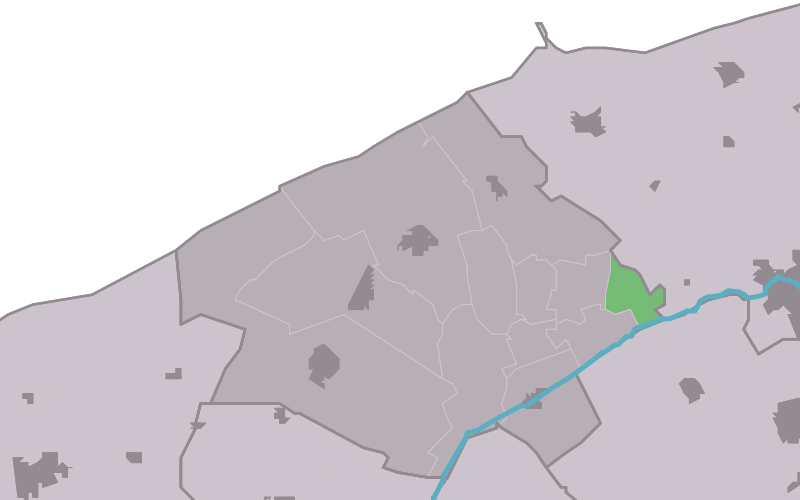
- Location in the former Ferwerderadiel municipality

- Location in the Netherlands Lichtaard (Netherlands)
- Country: Netherlands
- Province: Friesland
- Municipality: Noardeast-Fryslân

Area
  - Total: 2.30 km^{2} (0.89 sq mi)
- Elevation: 0.8 m (2.6 ft)

Population (2021)
  - Total: 90
  - Density: 39/km^{2} (100/sq mi)
- Time zone: UTC+1 (CET)
  - Summer (DST): UTC+2 (CEST)
- Postal code: 9176
- Dialing code: 0519

Lichtaard is a village in Noardeast-Fryslân in the province of Friesland, the Netherlands. It had a population of around 76 in January 2017. Before 2019, the village was part of the Ferwerderadiel municipality.

== History ==
The village was first mentioned in 944 as Lihdanfurt. Lichtaard means "light terp. Lichtaard is a terp (artificial living hill) village with two terps. The terp on which the church is built, dates from before Christ. The church dates from the Middle Ages, but has been extensively modified around 1642.

Lichtaard used to have a school as early as 1677. In 1830, a new school was built, however the school closed in 1882 due to lack of students. In 1840, Lichtaard was home to 89 people.

== Gallery ==
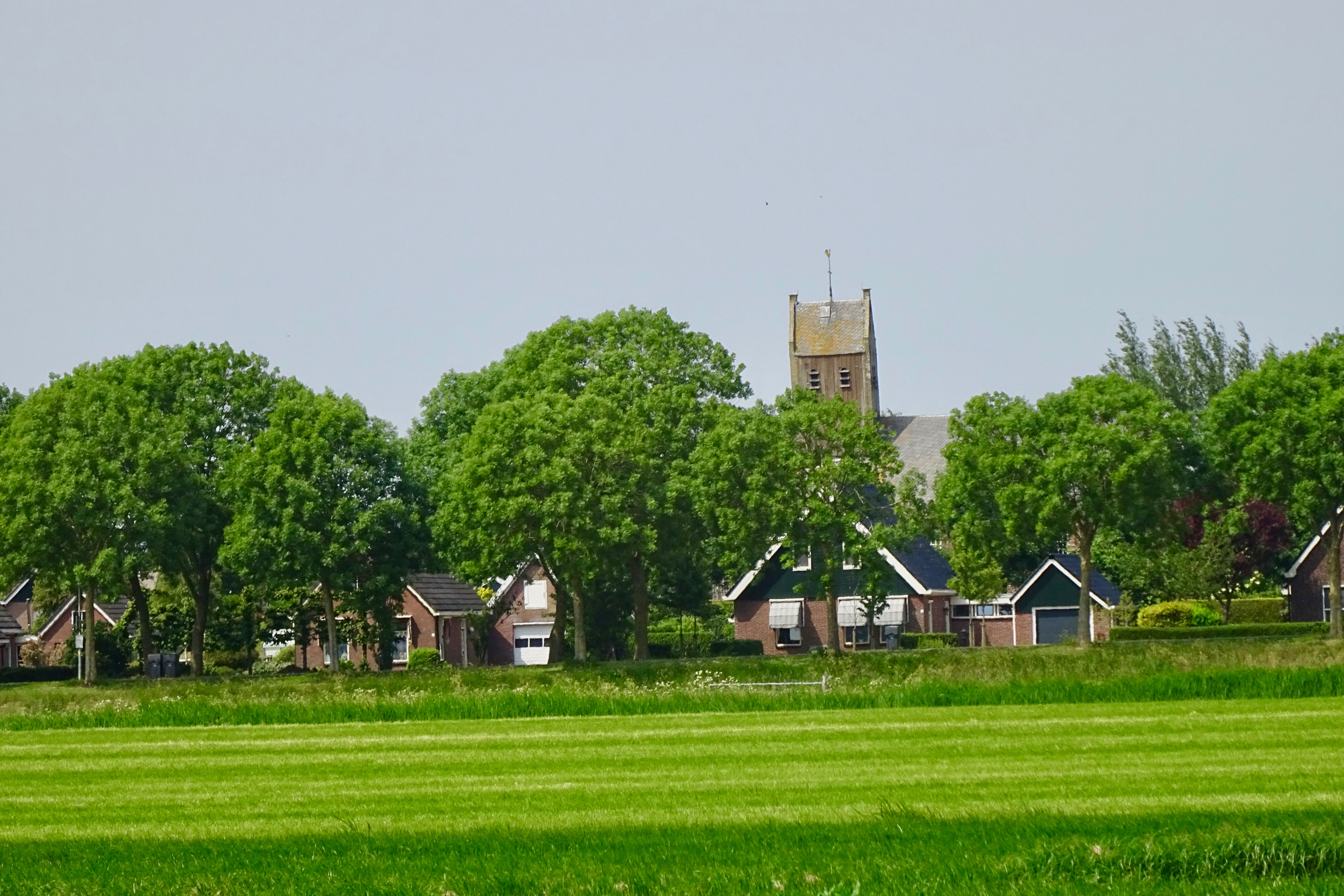
View on Lichtaard

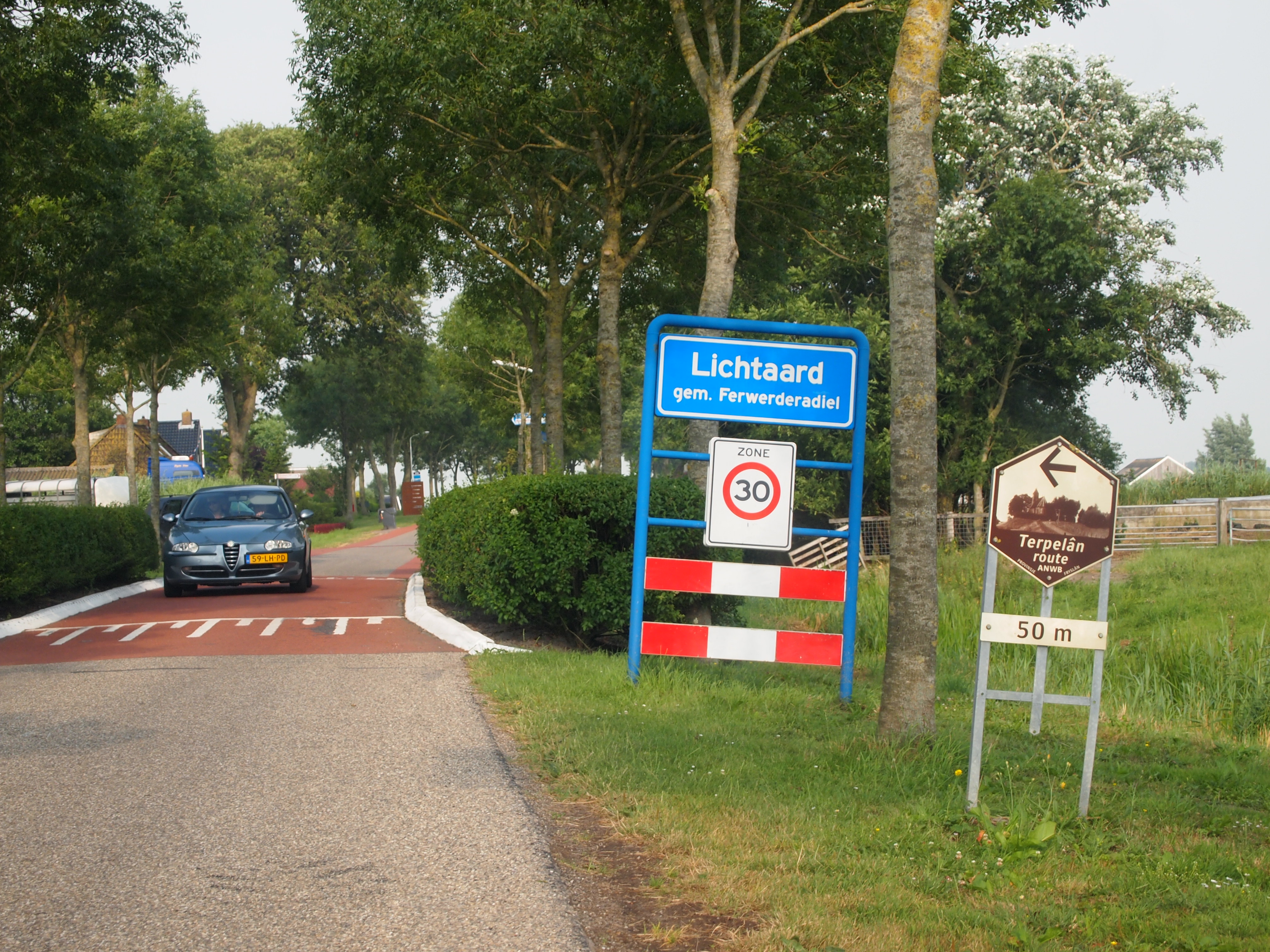
Welcome to Lichtaard
