= Hiaure =

Hiaure De Lytse Jouwer
- Village
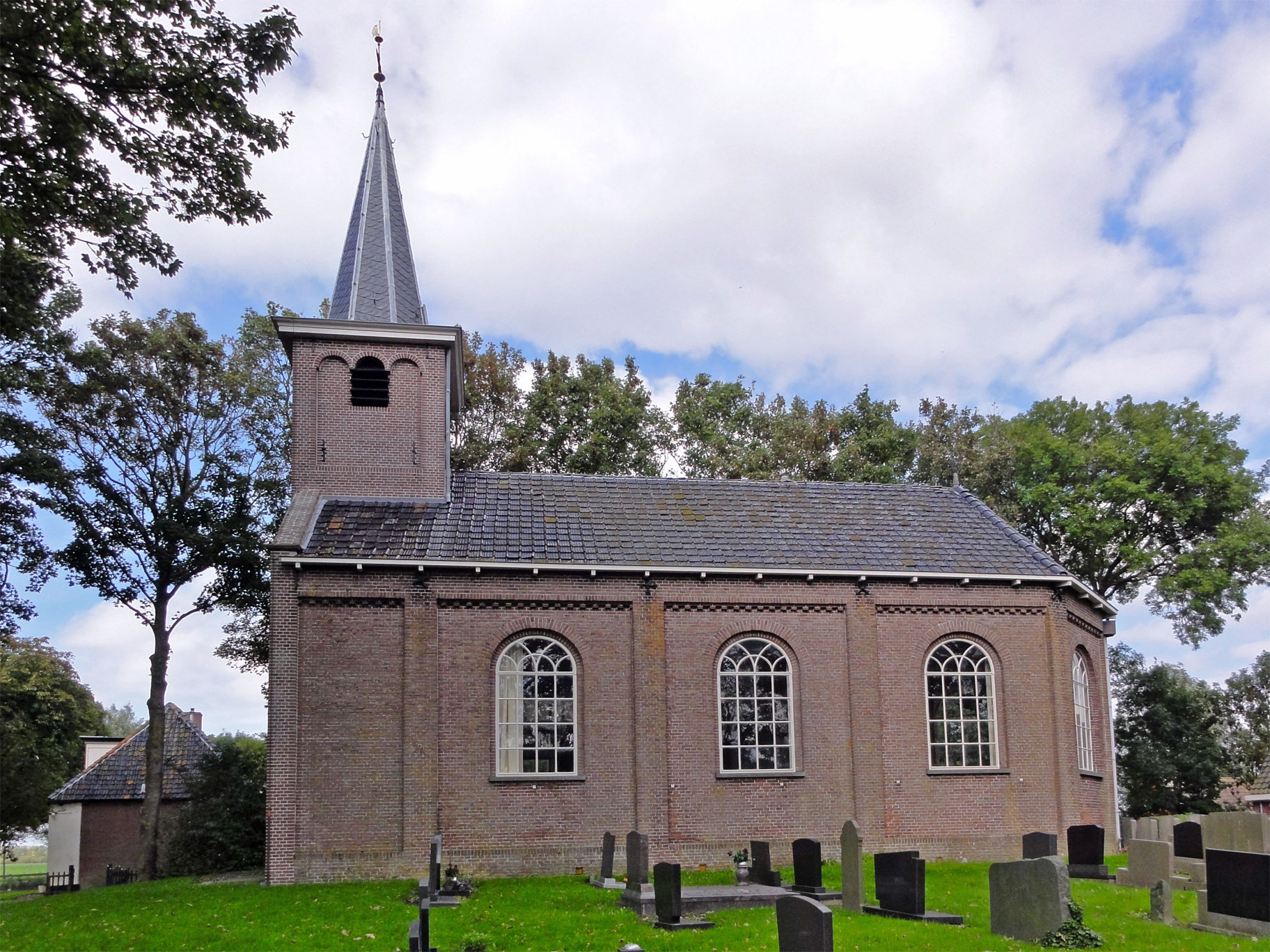
- Hiaure church

- Flag Coat of arms

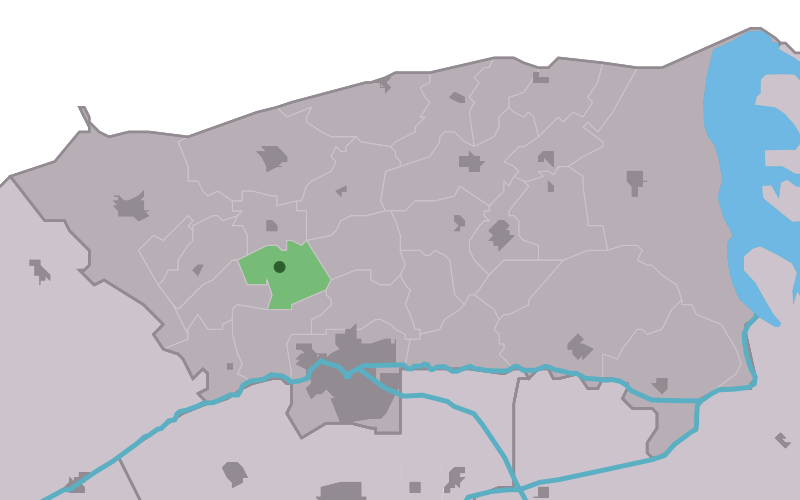
- Location in the former Dongeradeel municipality

- Location in the Netherlands Hiaure (Netherlands)
- Country: Netherlands
- Province: Friesland
- Municipality: Noardeast-Fryslân

Area
  - Total: 2.47 km^{2} (0.95 sq mi)
- Elevation: 0.6 m (2.0 ft)

Population (2021)
  - Total: 70
  - Density: 28/km^{2} (73/sq mi)
- Time zone: UTC+1 (CET)
  - Summer (DST): UTC+2 (CEST)
- Postal code: 9148
- Dialing code: 0519

Hiaure (West Frisian: De Lytse Jouwer) is a small village in Noardeast-Fryslân in the province of Friesland, the Netherlands. It had a population of around 65 in January 2017. Before 2019, the village was part of the Dongeradeel municipality.

The village was first mentioned in 1230 as de Jeure. The etymologie is unknown. The Dutch Reformed church was built in 1869 as a replacement of the medieval church. It is located on its own terp (artificial living hill). In 1840, Hiaure was home to 114 people.
