= Moarre =

- Village
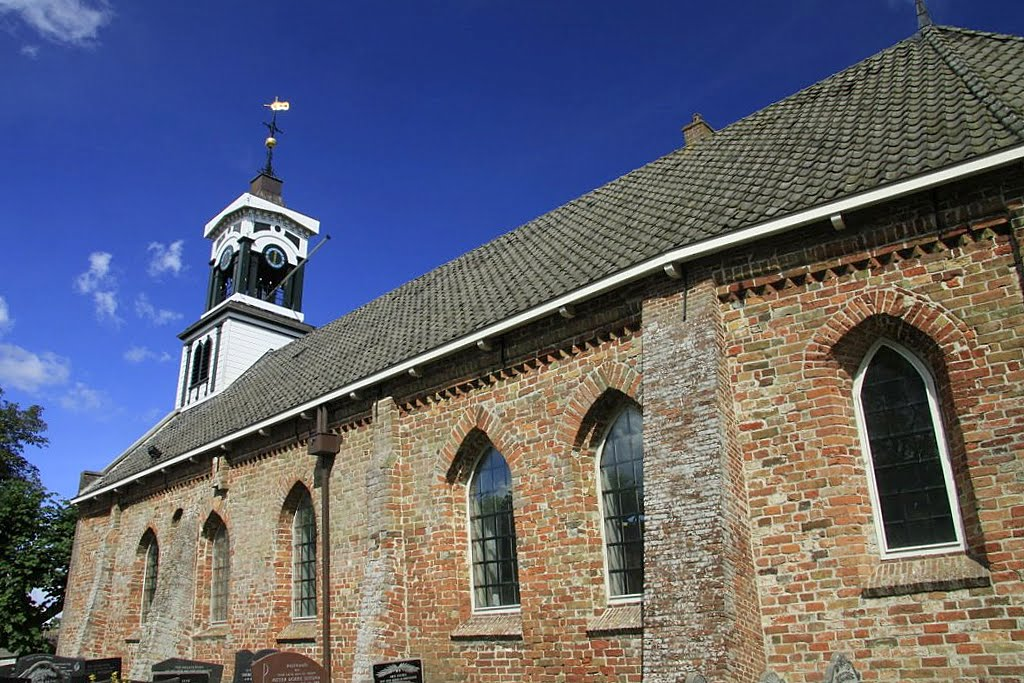
- Saint John, Moarre

- Flag Coat of arms

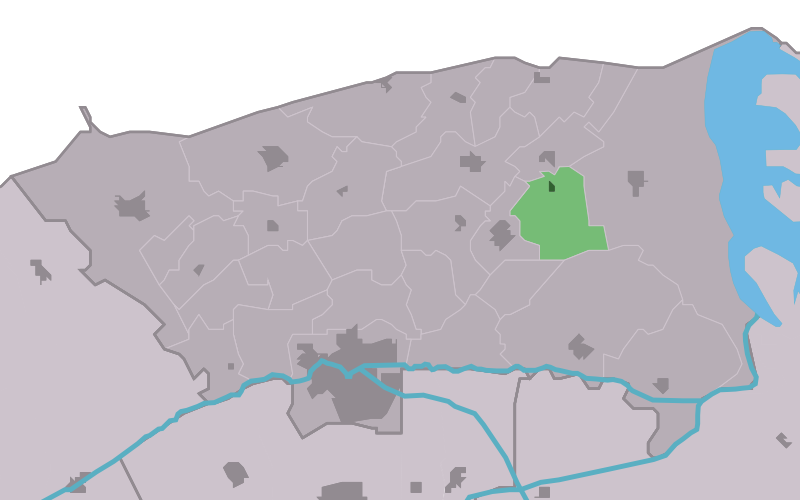
- Location in the former Dongeradeel municipality

- Location in the Netherlands Moarre (Netherlands)
- Country: Netherlands
- Province: Friesland
- Municipality: Noardeast-Fryslân

Population (2017)
  - Total: 227
- Time zone: UTC+1 (CET)
  - Summer (DST): UTC+2 (CEST)
- Postal code: 9204
- Telephone area: 0519

Moarre (Dutch: Morra) is a village in Noardeast-Fryslân, Friesland, the Netherlands with roughly 227 inhabitants in January 2017. Before 2019, the village was part of the Dongeradeel municipality.

== History ==
The village has a church with a characteristic 13th-century tower. Highway N361 runs just to the south of the village.

Moarre was surrounded by fens (marshland) which are now cultivated. The name Moarre means marshland in Frisian, and is related to the English word moor.

The people in Moarre are predominantly Frisians and speak West Frisian. The village has locally produced drama productions, an orchestra, and a handball club.

Moarre is adjacent to the village of Ljussens and they are administered together as a pair (dubbeldorp) sharing facilities such as the local sports field and the primary school. There was a station called Morra-Lioessens on the North Friesland Railway, which opened in 1913 and closed in 1935, although it reopened again briefly during World War II from May 1940 to July 1942.

The village's official name was changed from Morra to Moarre in 2023.
