= Wetsens =

- Village
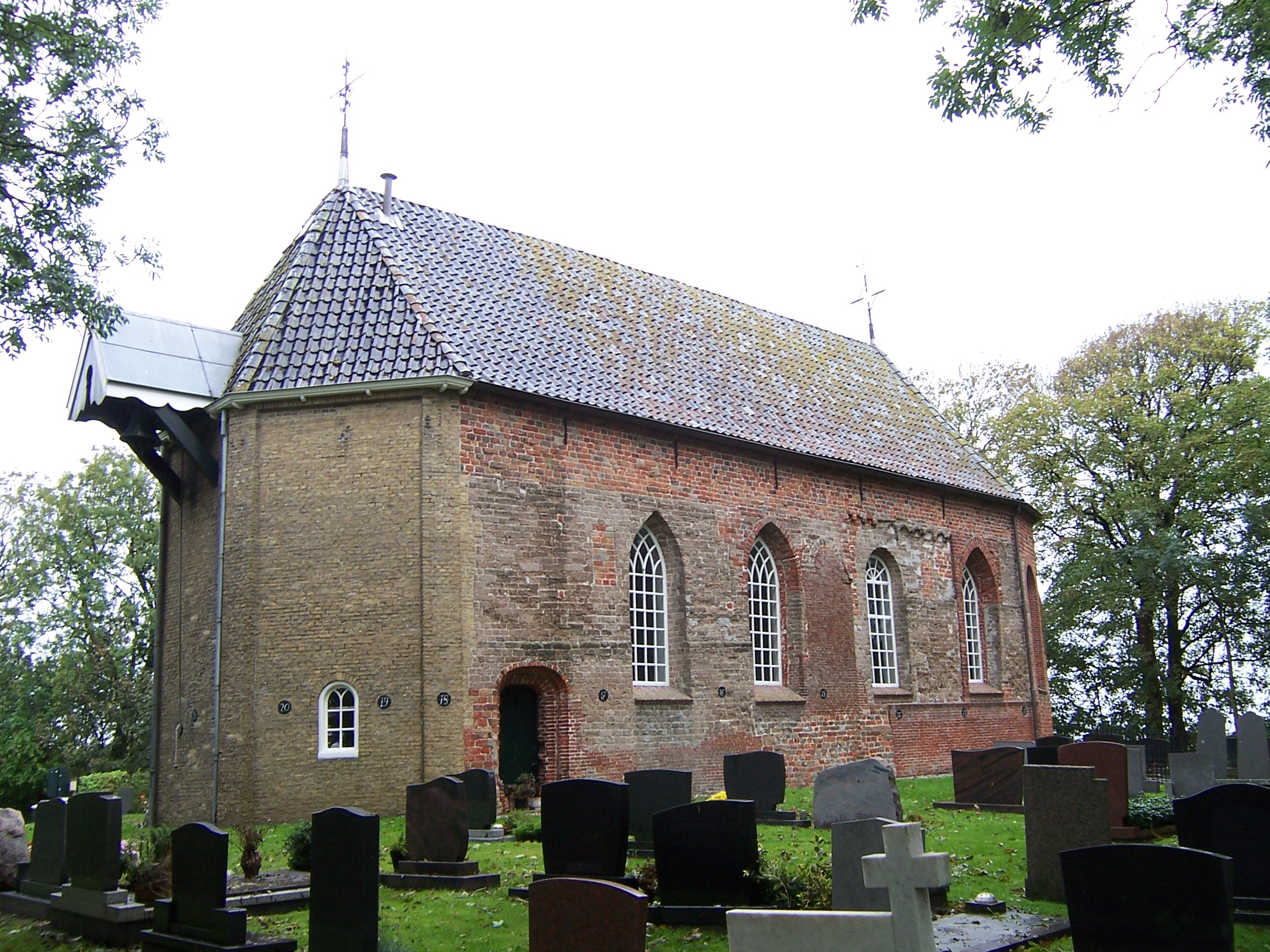
- St Vitus' church

- Flag Coat of arms

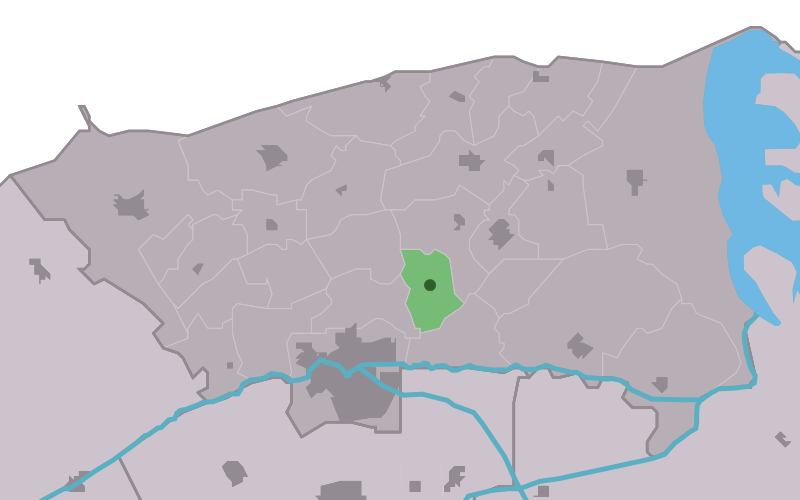
- Location in the former Dongeradeel municipality

- Location in the Netherlands Wetsens (Netherlands)
- Country: Netherlands
- Province: Friesland
- Municipality: Noardeast-Fryslân

Area
  - Total: 2.65 km^{2} (1.02 sq mi)
- Elevation: 0.4 m (1.3 ft)

Population (2021)
  - Total: 55
  - Density: 21/km^{2} (54/sq mi)
- Time zone: UTC+1 (CET)
  - Summer (DST): UTC+2 (CEST)
- Postal code: 9122
- Dialing code: 0519

Wetsens is a village in Noardeast-Fryslân in the province of Friesland, the Netherlands. It had a population of around 55 in January 2017. and is considered to be one of the oldest villages in the north-east of Friesland. Before 2019, the village was part of the Dongeradeel municipality.

The village was first mentioned in 1417 as Witzenser Therpe, and means "terp (artificial living mound) of the people of Wytse". See also Wetsinge. The Dutch Reformed church dates from the 12th century. In 1842, the tower collapsed, and has been replaced by a simple belfry. In 1840, Wetsens was home to 131 people.
