= Jouswier =

- Village
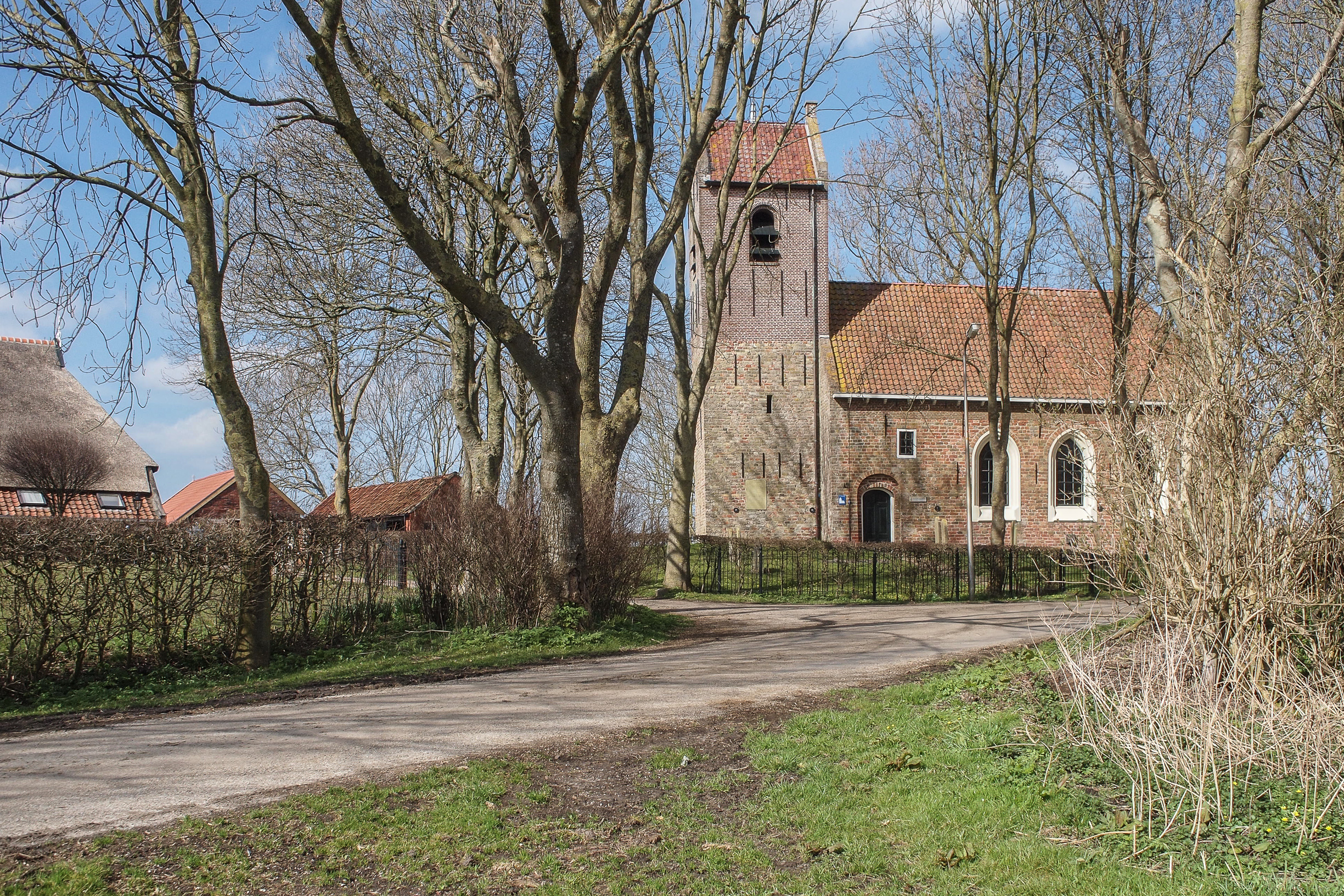
- Jouswier church

- Flag Coat of arms

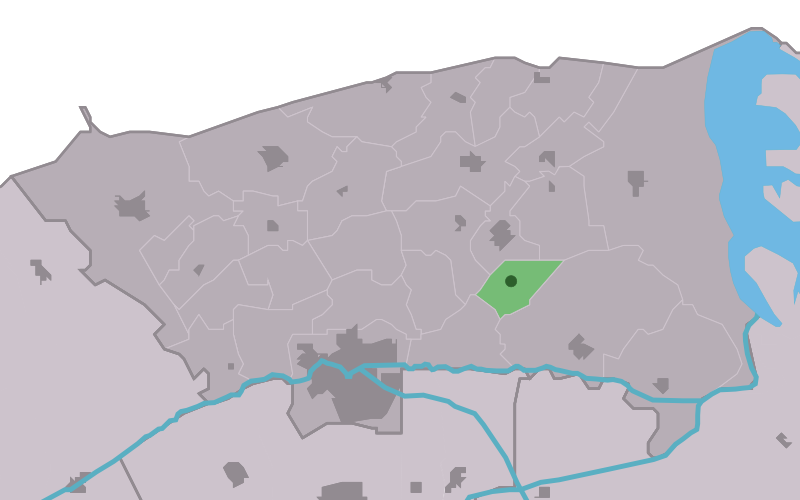
- Location in the former Dongeradeel municipality

- Location in the Netherlands Jouswier (Netherlands)
- Country: Netherlands
- Province: Friesland
- Municipality: Noardeast-Fryslân

Area
  - Total: 2.55 km^{2} (0.98 sq mi)
- Elevation: 0.6 m (2.0 ft)

Population (2021)
  - Total: 45
  - Density: 18/km^{2} (46/sq mi)
- Time zone: UTC+1 (CET)
  - Summer (DST): UTC+2 (CEST)
- Postal code: 9124
- Dialing code: 0519

Jouswier is a small village in Noardeast-Fryslân in the province of Friesland, the Netherlands. It had a population of around 44 in January 2017. Before 2019, the village was part of the Dongeradeel municipality.

It is located on a terp (artificial living mound) to the northeast of Dokkum and to the southeast of Metslawier.

== History ==
The village was first mentioned in 1495 as Juusweer, and means "terp of Jouw(we) (person)". The Dutch Reformed church was built in 1557 and the tower dates from 1752. It was restored in 1987. A large part of the terp has been excavated. In 1840, Jouswier was home to 59 people.

== Gallery ==
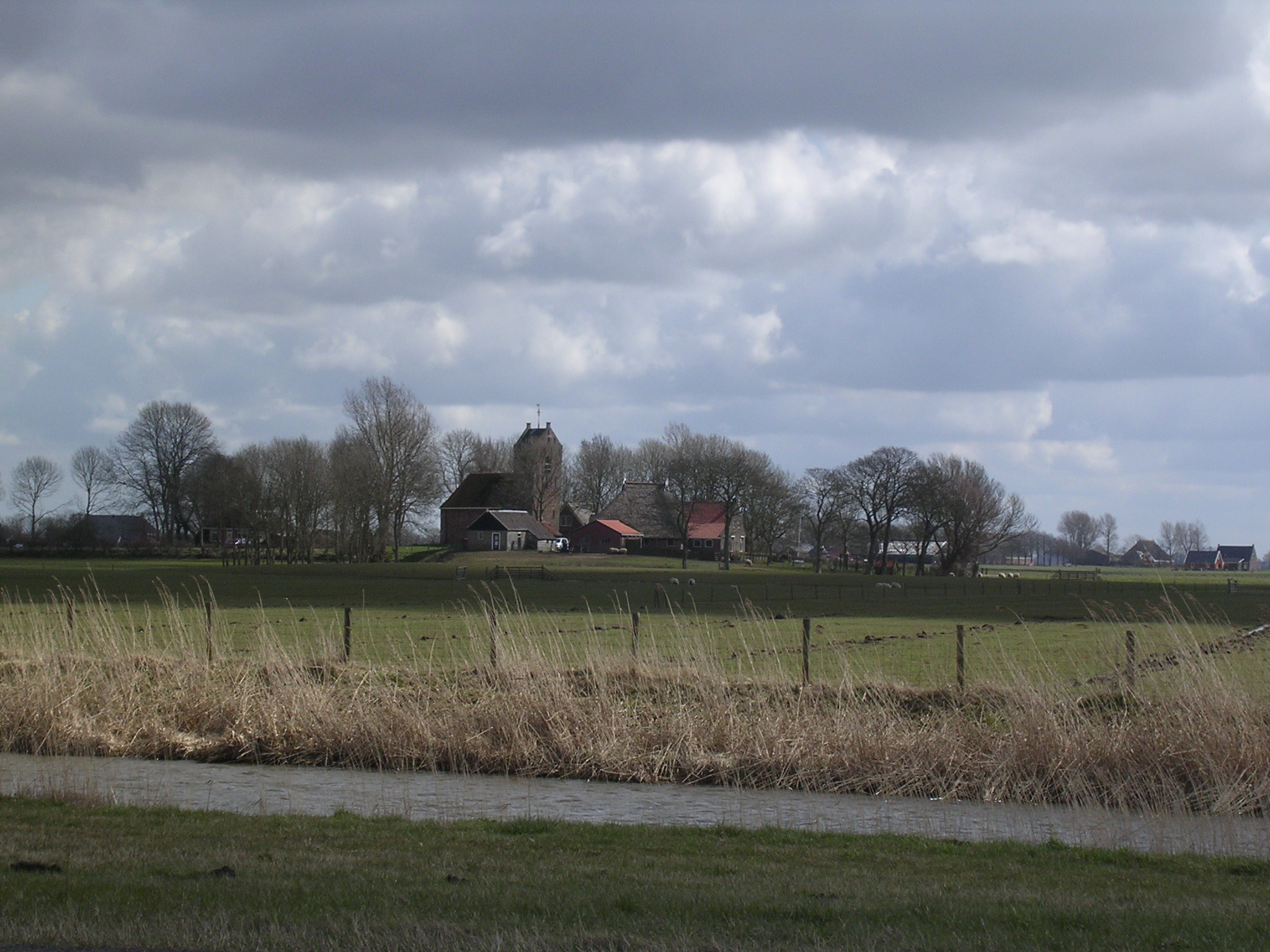
View on Jouswier

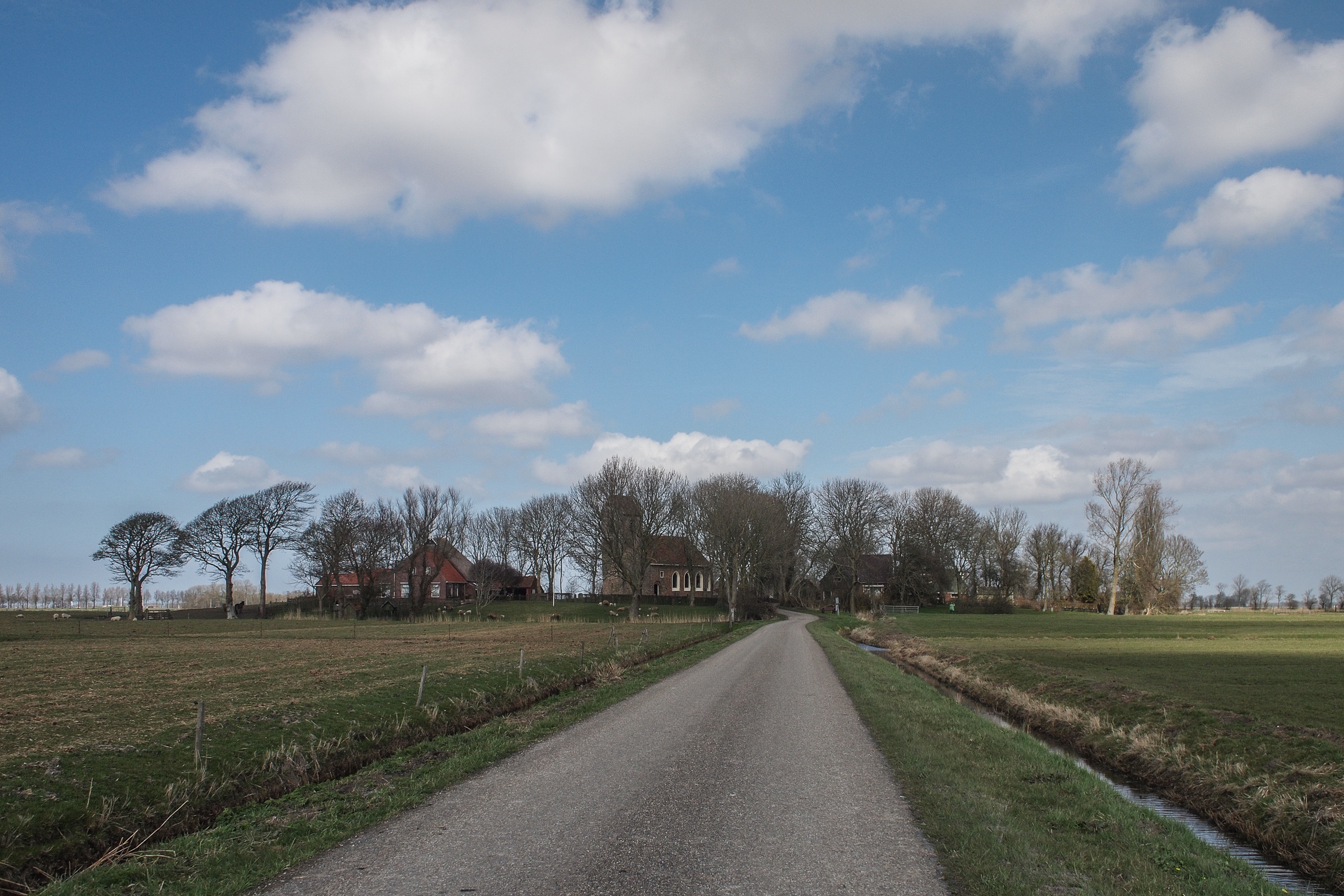
View on Jouswier

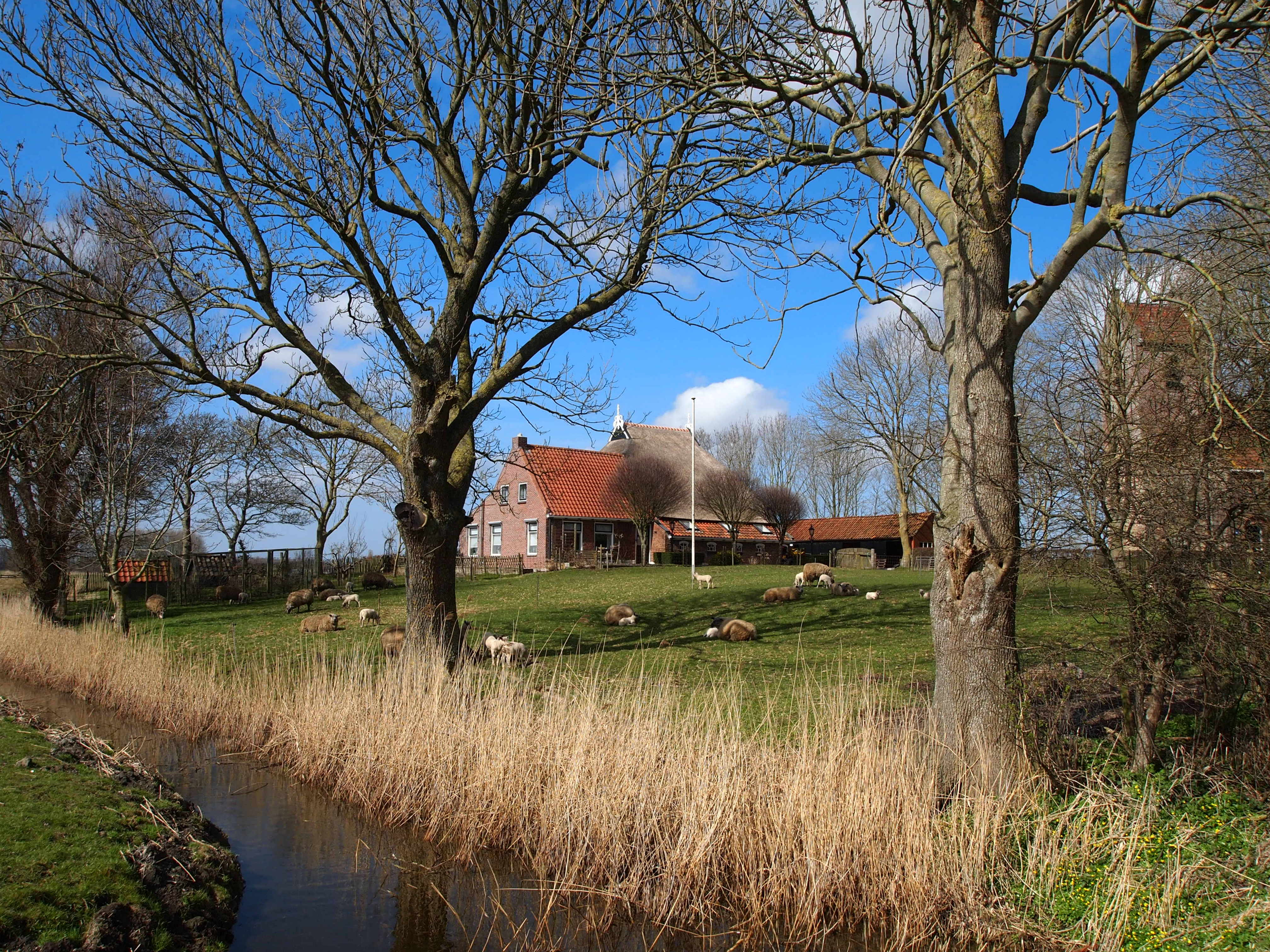
Farm in Jouswier
