= Nijewier =

- Village
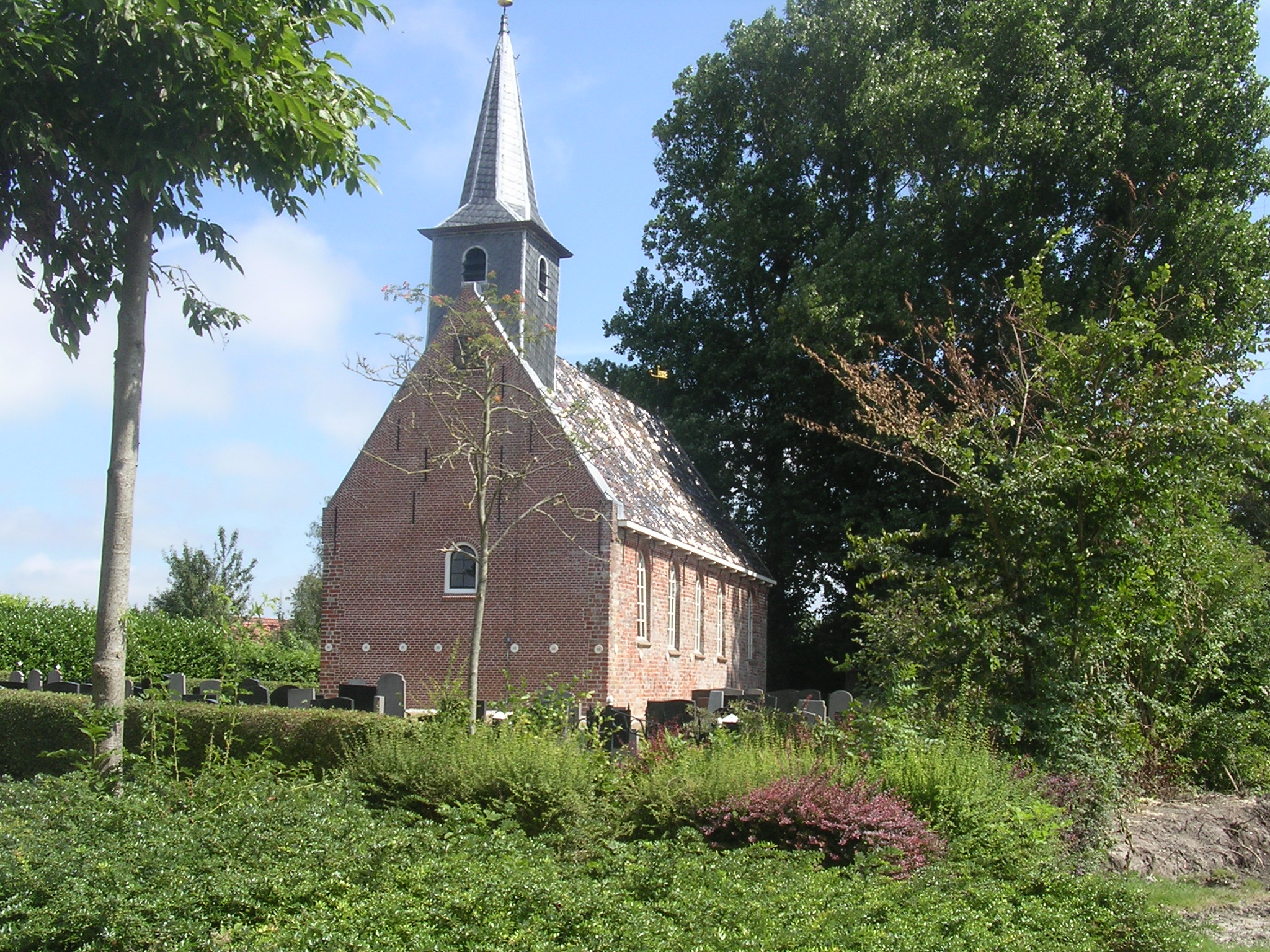
- Church of Nijewier, built in 1678

- Flag Coat of arms

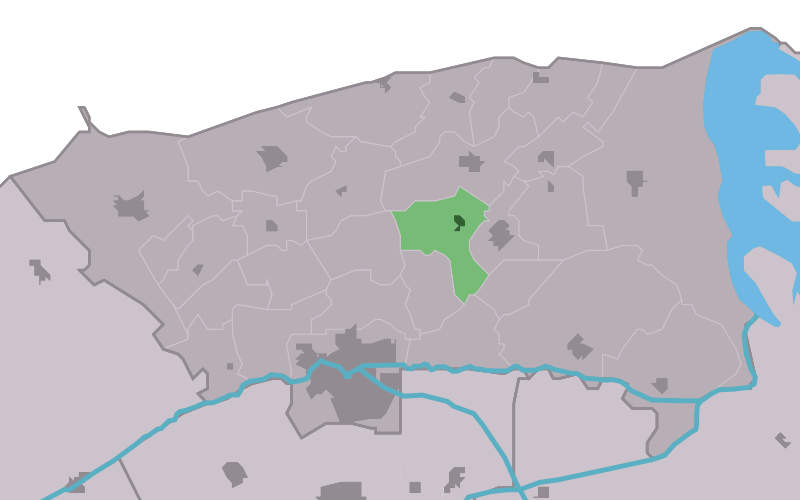
- Location in the former Dongeradeel municipality

- Location in the Netherlands Nijewier (Netherlands)
- Country: Netherlands
- Province: Friesland
- Municipality: Noardeast-Fryslân

Area
  - Total: 4.88 km^{2} (1.88 sq mi)
- Elevation: 0.4 m (1.3 ft)

Population (2021)
  - Total: 370
  - Density: 76/km^{2} (200/sq mi)
- Time zone: UTC+1 (CET)
  - Summer (DST): UTC+2 (CEST)
- Postal code: 9138
- Dialing code: 0519

Nijewier (Dutch: Niawier) is a village in Noardeast-Fryslân in the province of Friesland, the Netherlands. It had a population of around 366 in January 2017. Before 2019, the village was part of the Dongeradeel municipality.

== History ==
The village was first mentioned in 1467 as Nyaweer, and means new terp. Nijewier is a terp (artificial living mound) village with a square structure. The Cistercian monastery Sion was founded around 1100 and used to be located in the village. It was an outpost of Claercamp in Rinsumageast and one of the richest monasteries of the region. It was demolished in 1580.

The Dutch Reformed Church was built in 1668 as a replacement of its medieval predecessor and was restored in 1811. In 1840, Nijewier was home to 381 people.

The village's official name was changed from Niawier to Nijewier in 2023.

== Gallery ==
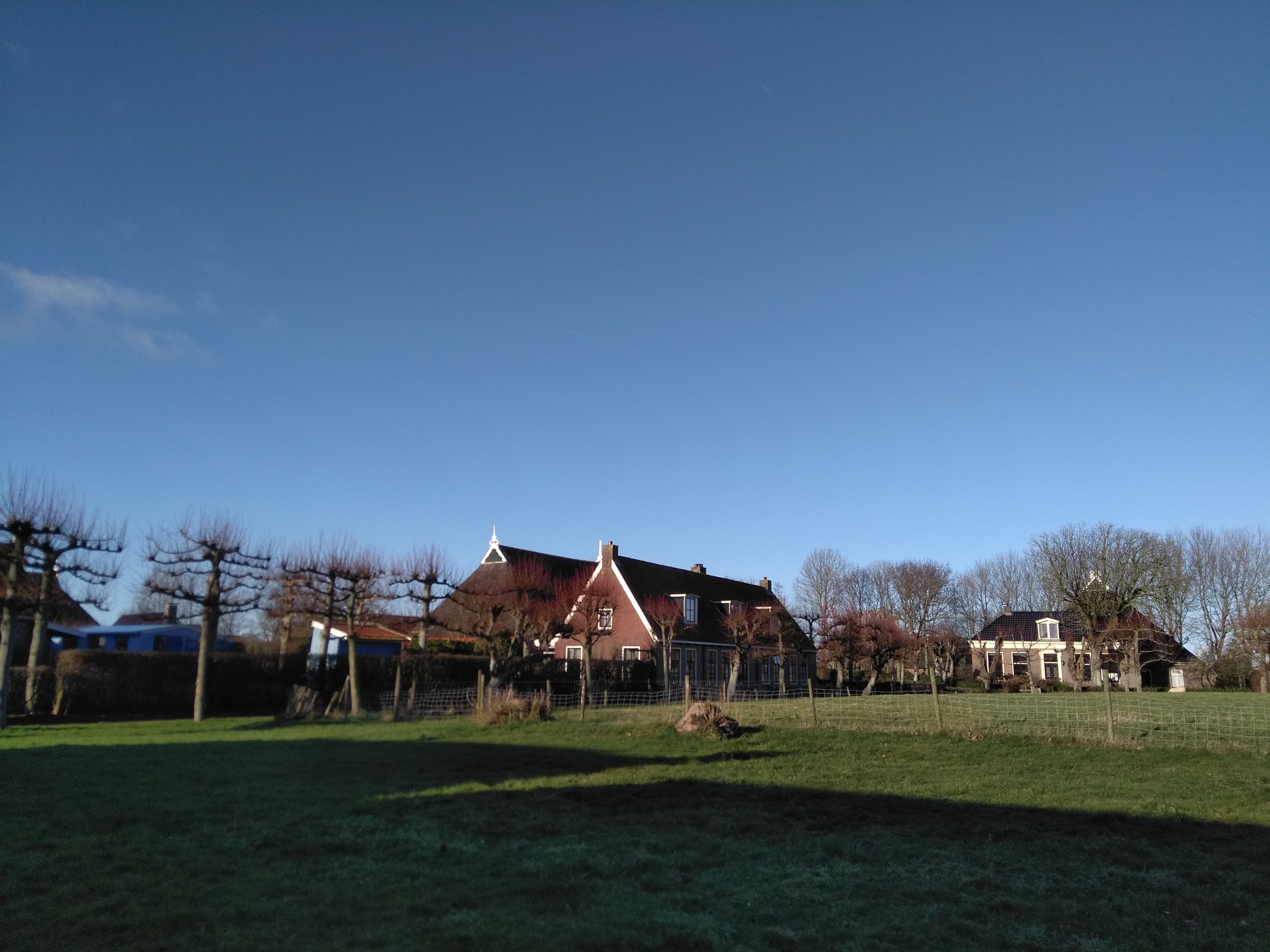
Houses on the terp

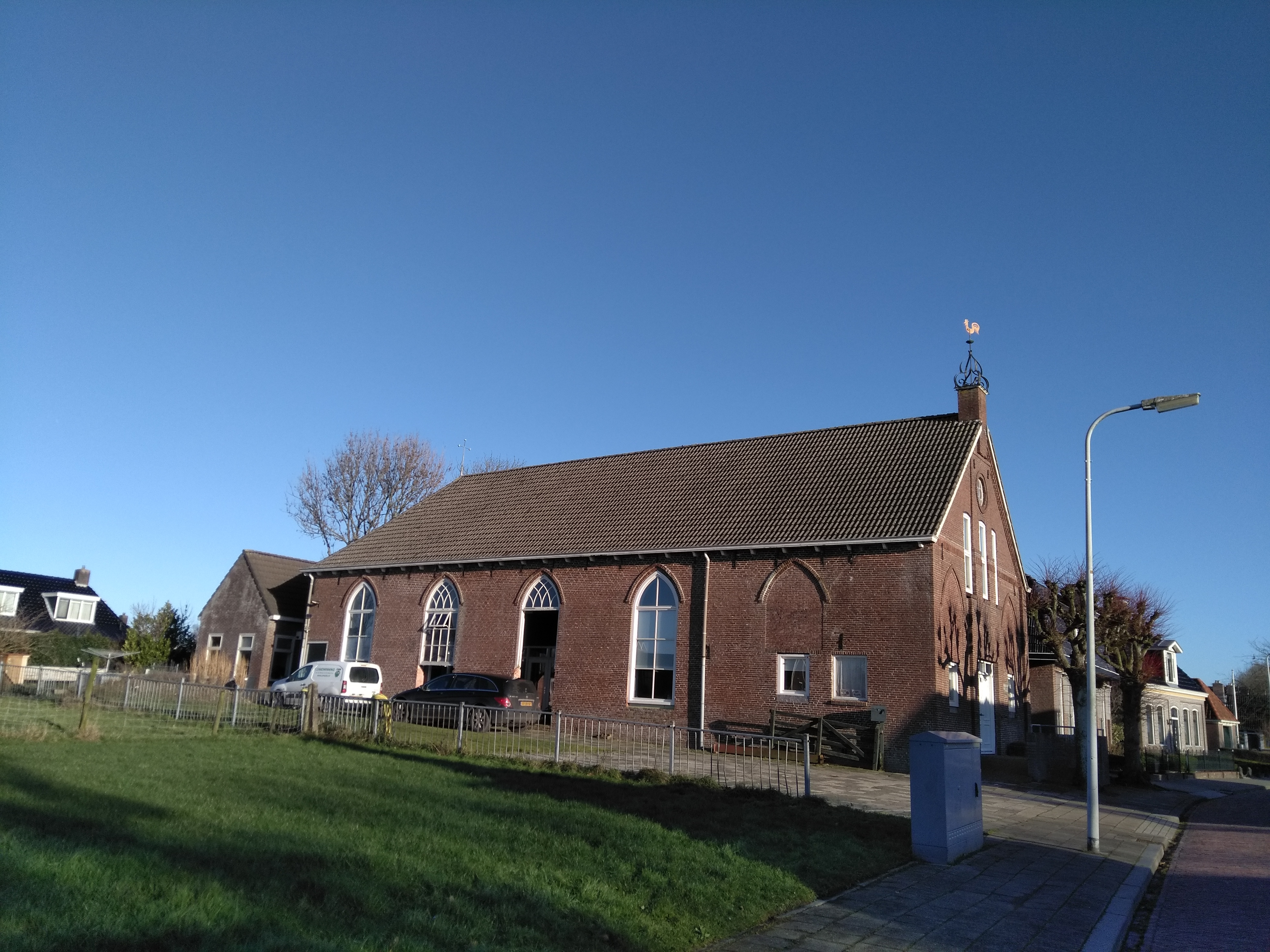
Former Reformed church

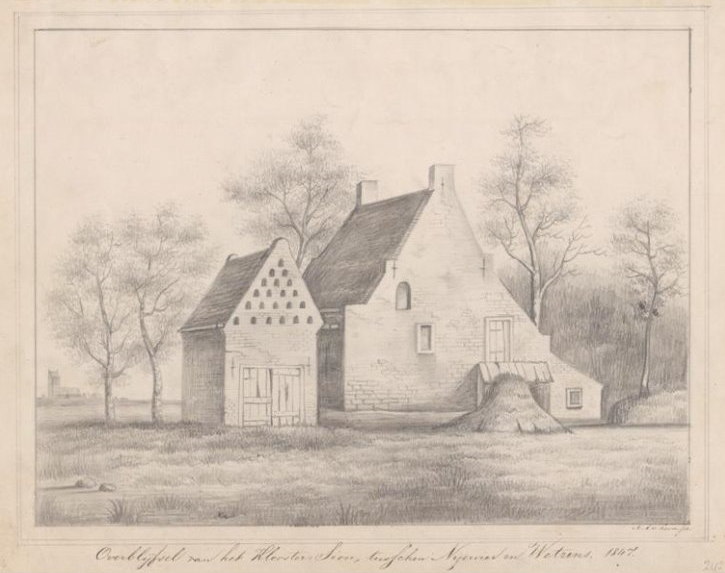
Drawing of the former monastery Sion (1847)

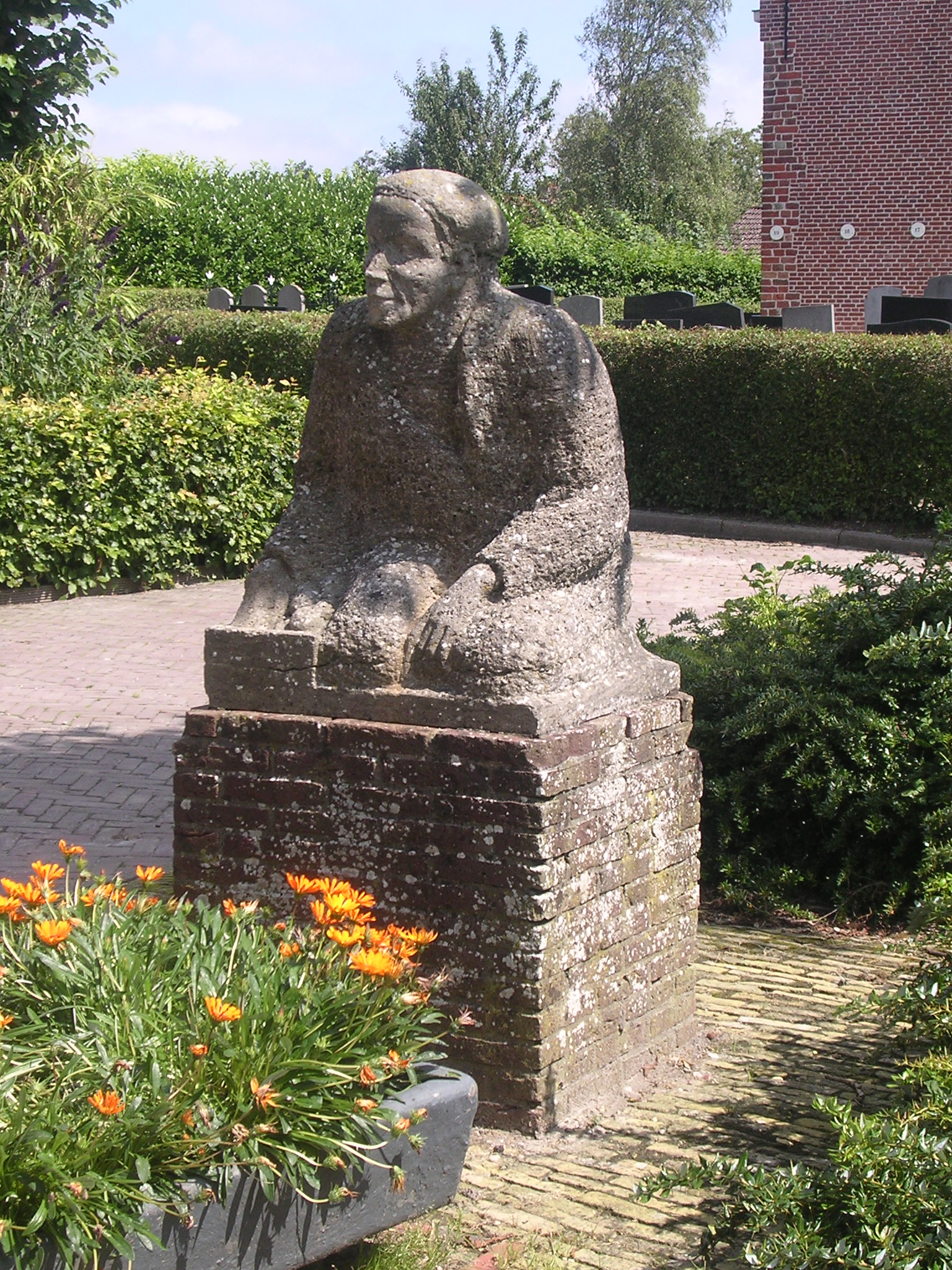
Sculpture of Anders Minnes Wijbenga
