= Raard =

- Village
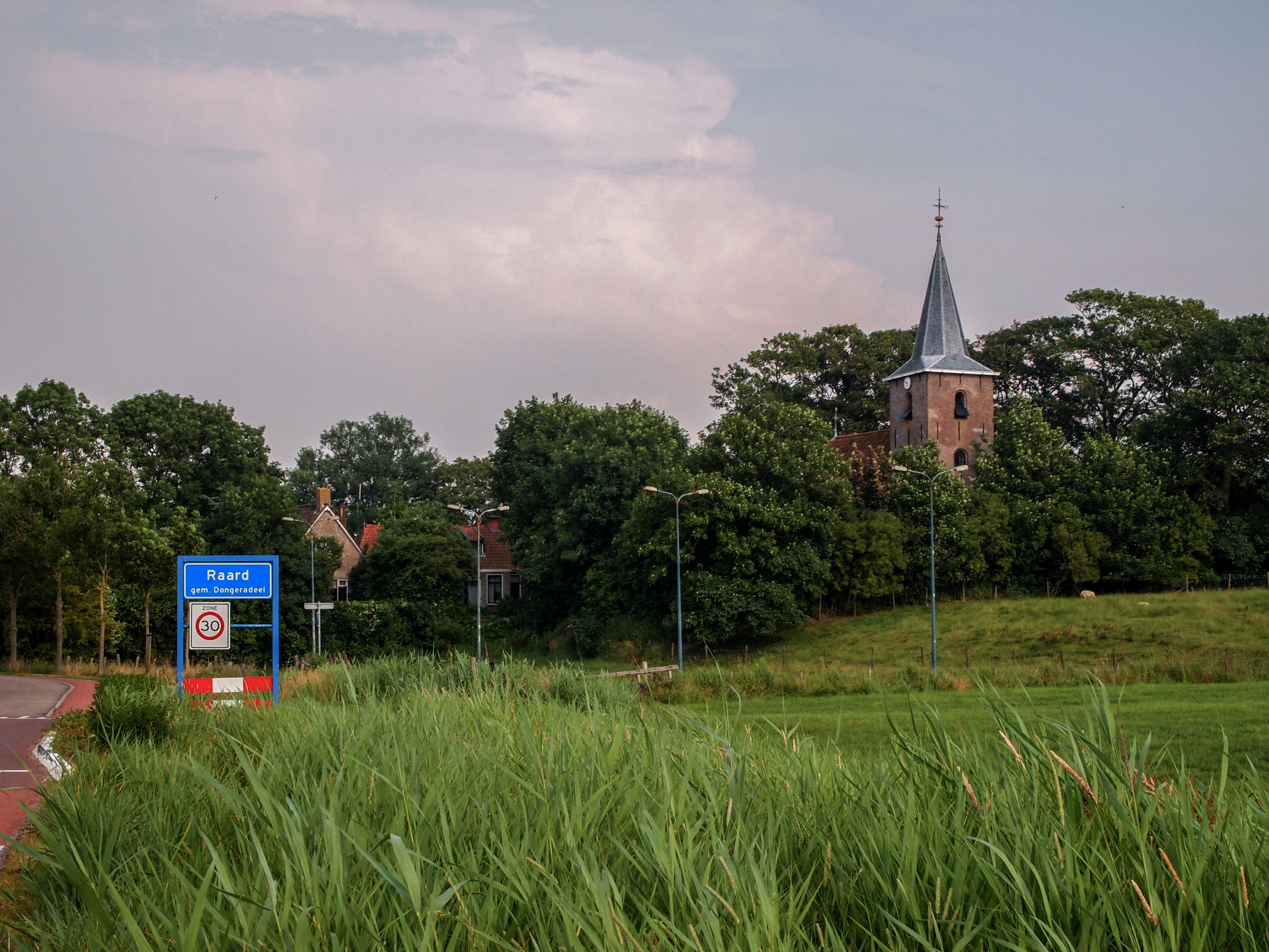
- Raard with St John the Baptist's church

- Flag Coat of arms

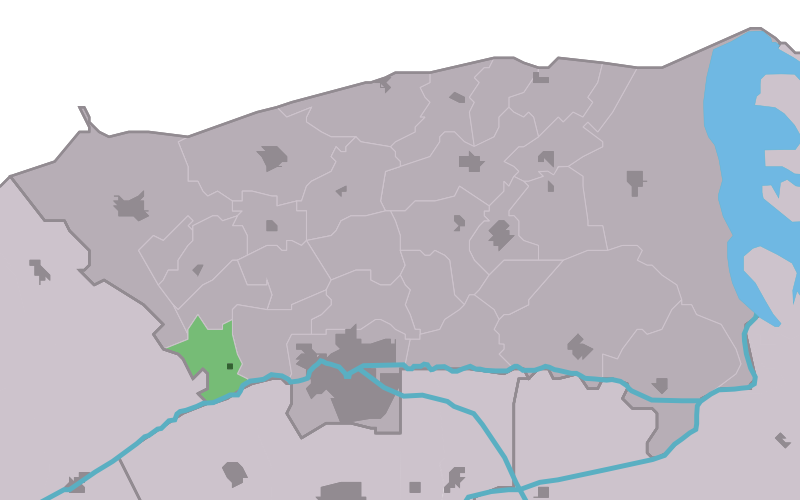
- Location in the former Dongeradeel municipality

- Location in the Netherlands Raard (Netherlands)
- Country: Netherlands
- Province: Friesland
- Municipality: Noardeast-Fryslân

Area
  - Total: 3.28 km^{2} (1.27 sq mi)
- Elevation: 0.4 m (1.3 ft)

Population (2021)
  - Total: 215
  - Density: 65.5/km^{2} (170/sq mi)
- Time zone: UTC+1 (CET)
  - Summer (DST): UTC+2 (CEST)
- Postal code: 9155
- Dialing code: 0519

Raard is a village in Noardeast-Fryslân in the province of Friesland, the Netherlands. It had a population of around 223 in January 2017. Before 2019, the village was part of the Dongeradeel municipality.

== History ==
The village was first mentioned in the late-9th century as Ruonwerde, and means terp or Runo. Raard is a terp (artificial living mound) village with an oval shape dating from several centuries before Christ.

The Dutch Reformed church dates from the 13th century and was restored in 1978. The author Piet Paaltjens used to be a minister at the church. The Reformed church dates from 1918, and a replaces an 1893 church.

In 1840, Raard was home to 133 people. Most of the terp was excavated at the end of the 19th century.

== Gallery ==
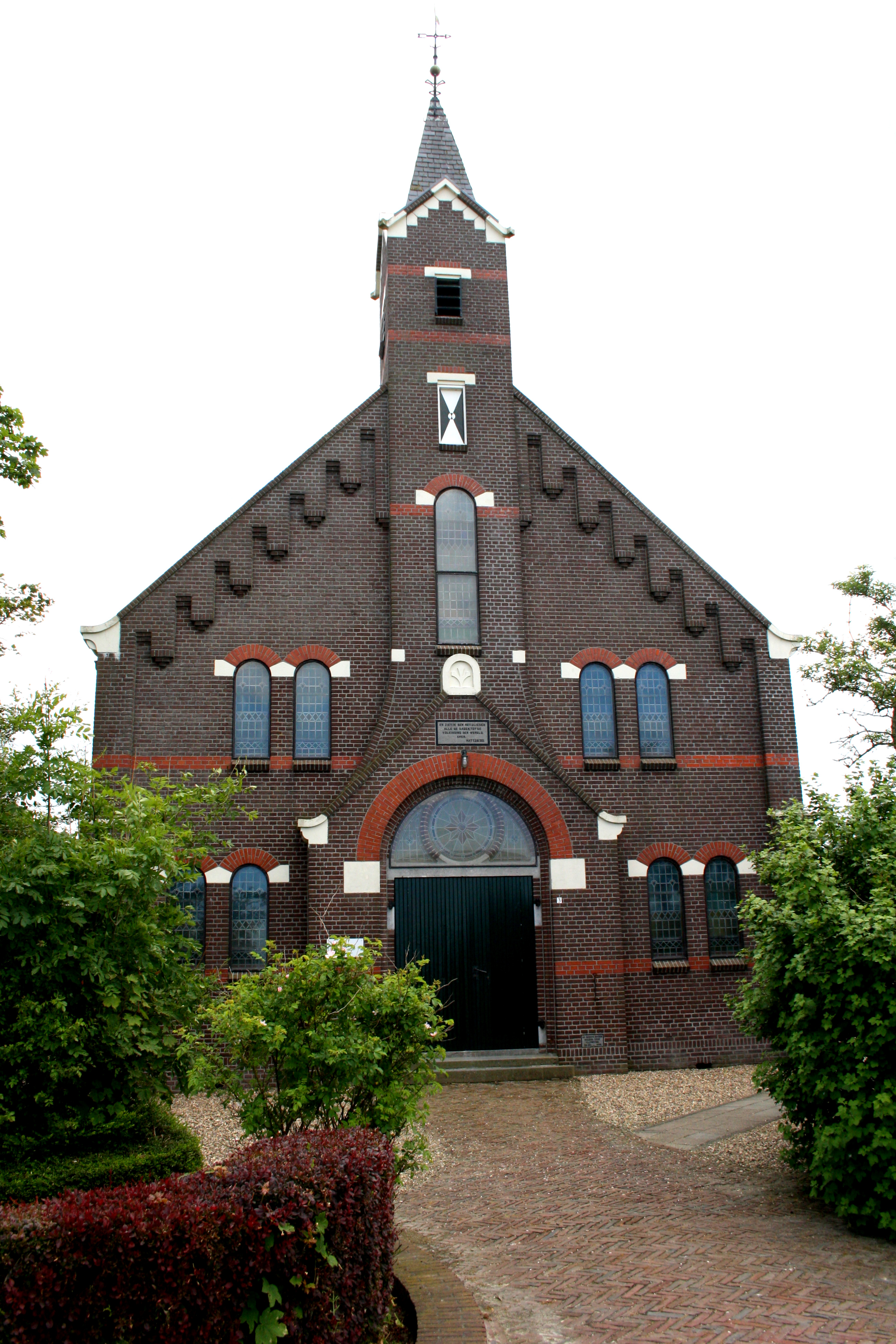
Reformed church

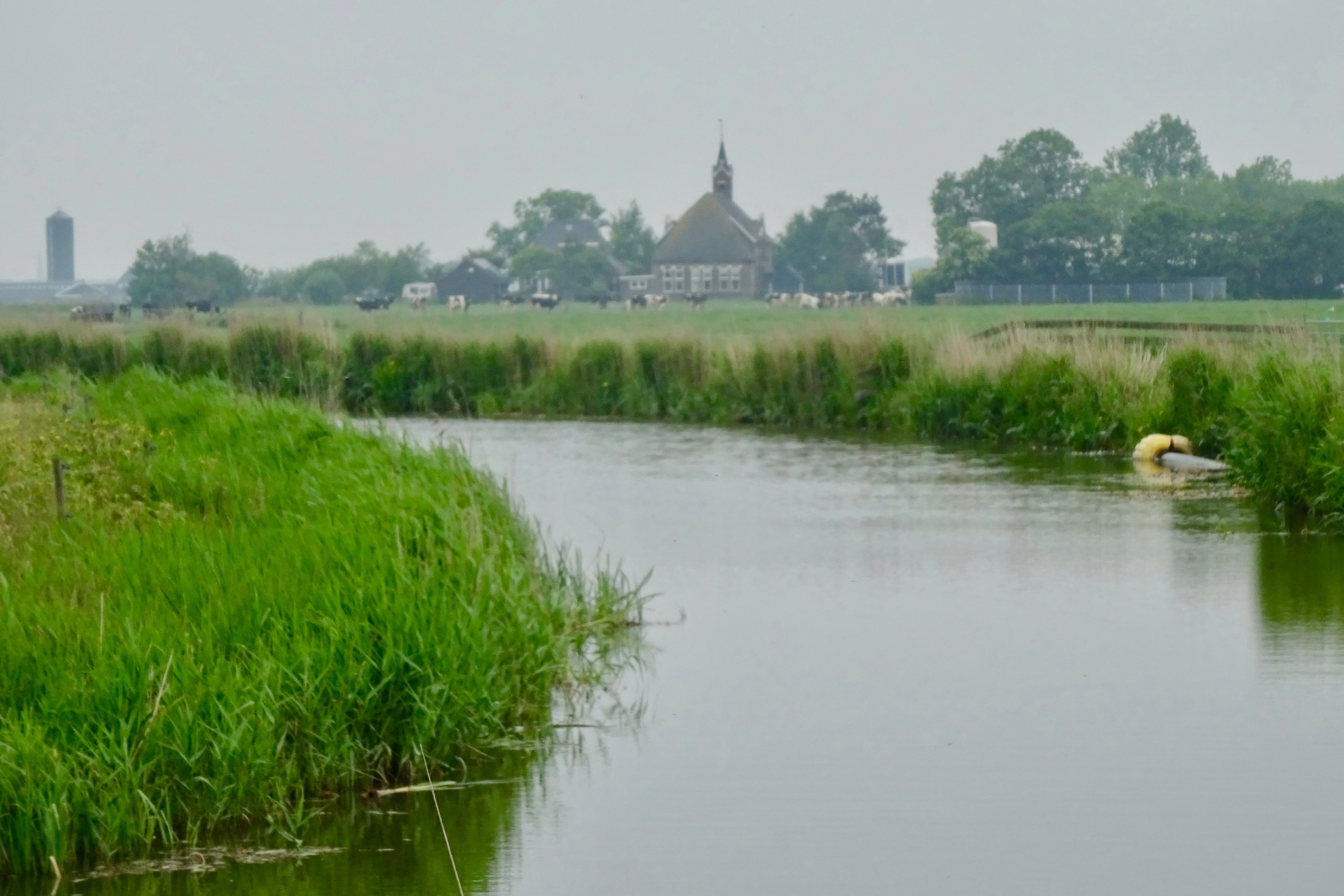
Raardervaart with view on the village

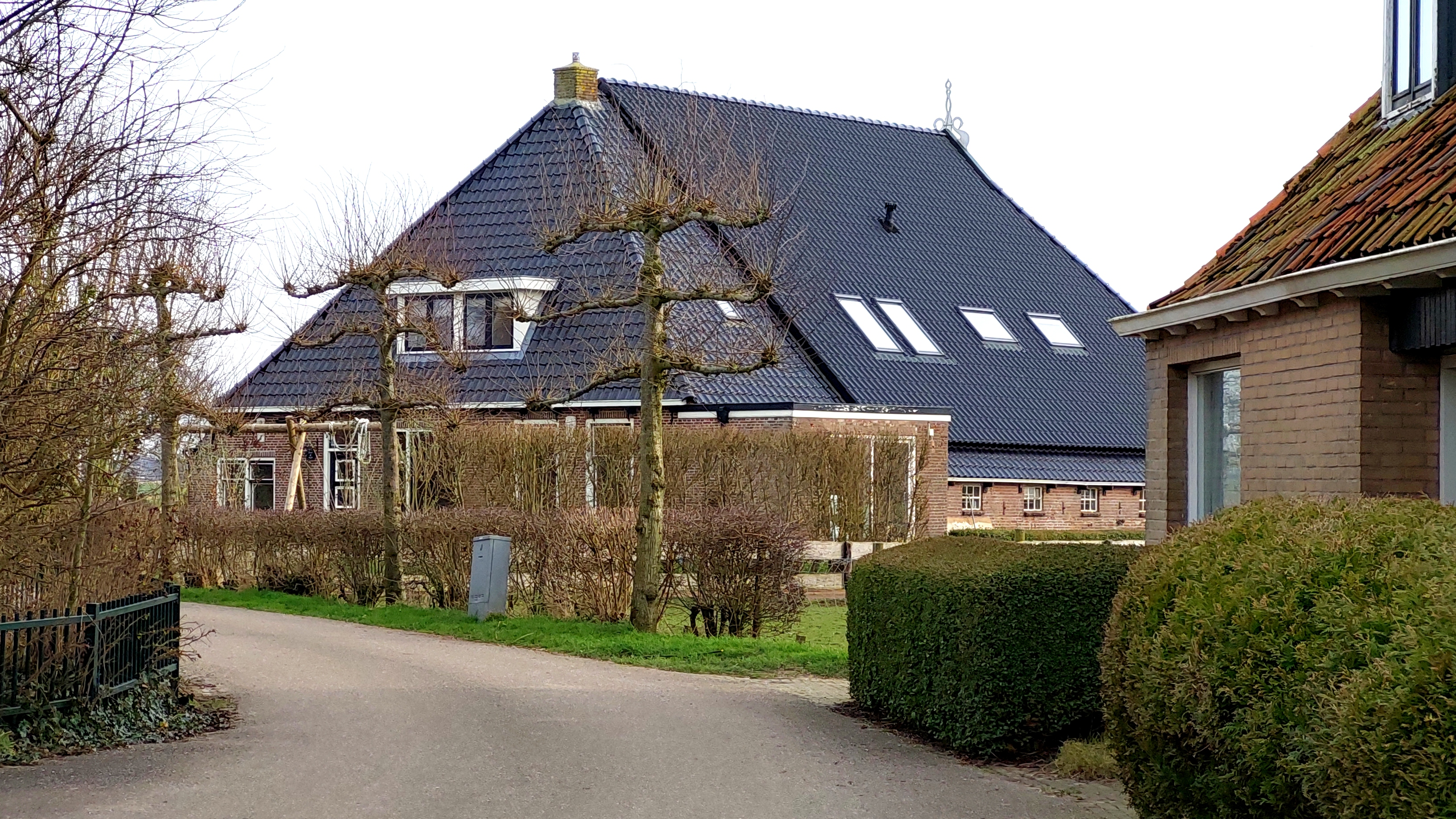
Farm in Raard

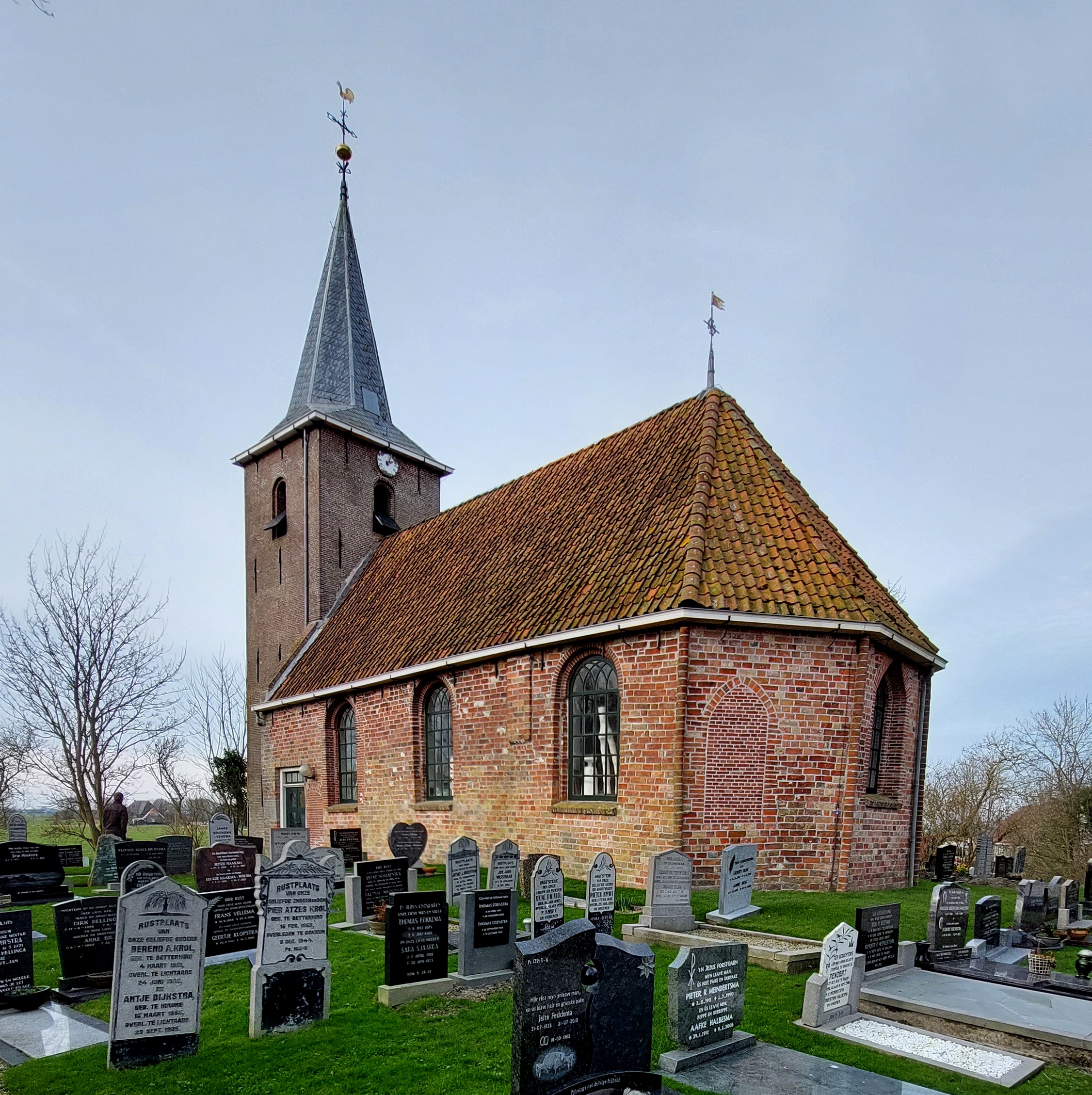
Dutch Reformed church
