= Dongeradeel =

Dongeradeel Dongeradiel
- Municipality
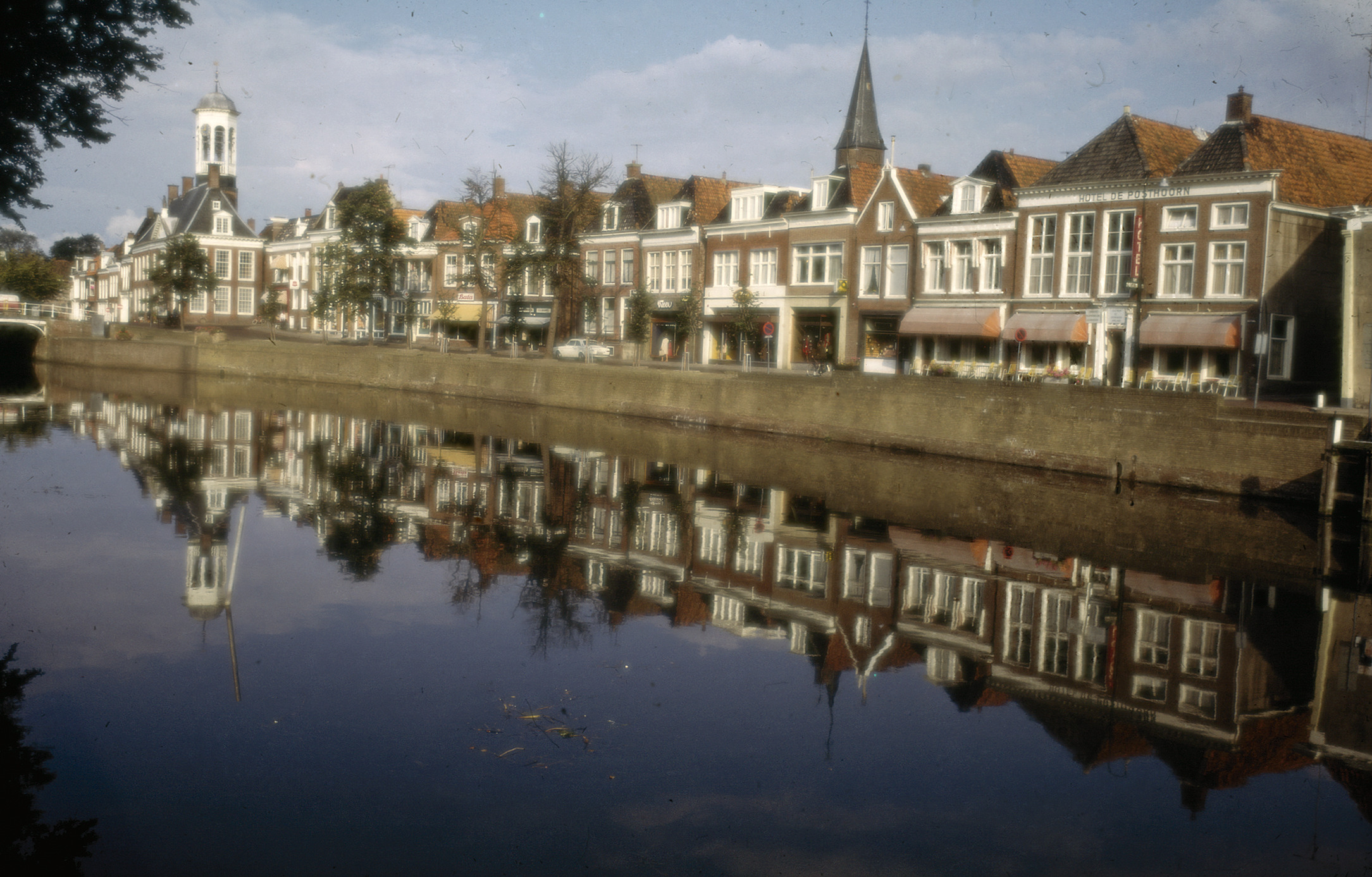
- Canal through Dokkum

- Flag Coat of arms

- Location in Friesland
- Coordinates: 53°20′N 6°0′E
- Country: Netherlands
- Province: Friesland
- Established: 1 January 1984
- Merged: 2019

Area
  - Total: 266.92 km^{2} (103.06 sq mi)
  - Land: 167.21 km^{2} (64.56 sq mi)
  - Water: 99.71 km^{2} (38.50 sq mi)
- Elevation: 4 m (13 ft)

Population (January 2021)
  - Total: data missing
- Time zone: UTC+1 (CET)
  - Summer (DST): UTC+2 (CEST)
- Postcode: 9100–9156
- Area code: 0519
- Website: www.dongeradeel.nl

Dongeradeel (Dutch: [ˈdɔŋəraːˌdeːl]; West Frisian: Dongeradiel [ˈdoŋəraˌdiəl]) is a former municipality in the northern Netherlands. In 2019 it merged with the municipalities of Ferwerderadiel and Kollumerland en Nieuwkruisland to form the new municipality Noardeast-Fryslân.

== History ==
Dongeradeel was created in 1984 from the merging of the old municipalities Westdongeradeel, Oostdongeradeel, and Dokkum.

== Population centres ==
Aalsum, Anjum, Bornwird, Brantgum, Dokkum, Ee, Engwierum, Foudgum, Hantum, Hantumeruitburen, Hantumhuizen, Hiaure, Holwerd, Jouswier, Lioessens, Metslawier, Moddergat, Morra, Nes, Niawier, Oosternijkerk, Oostmahorn, Oostrum, Paesens, Raard, Ternaard, Waaxens, Wetsens, Wierum.

=== Topography ===
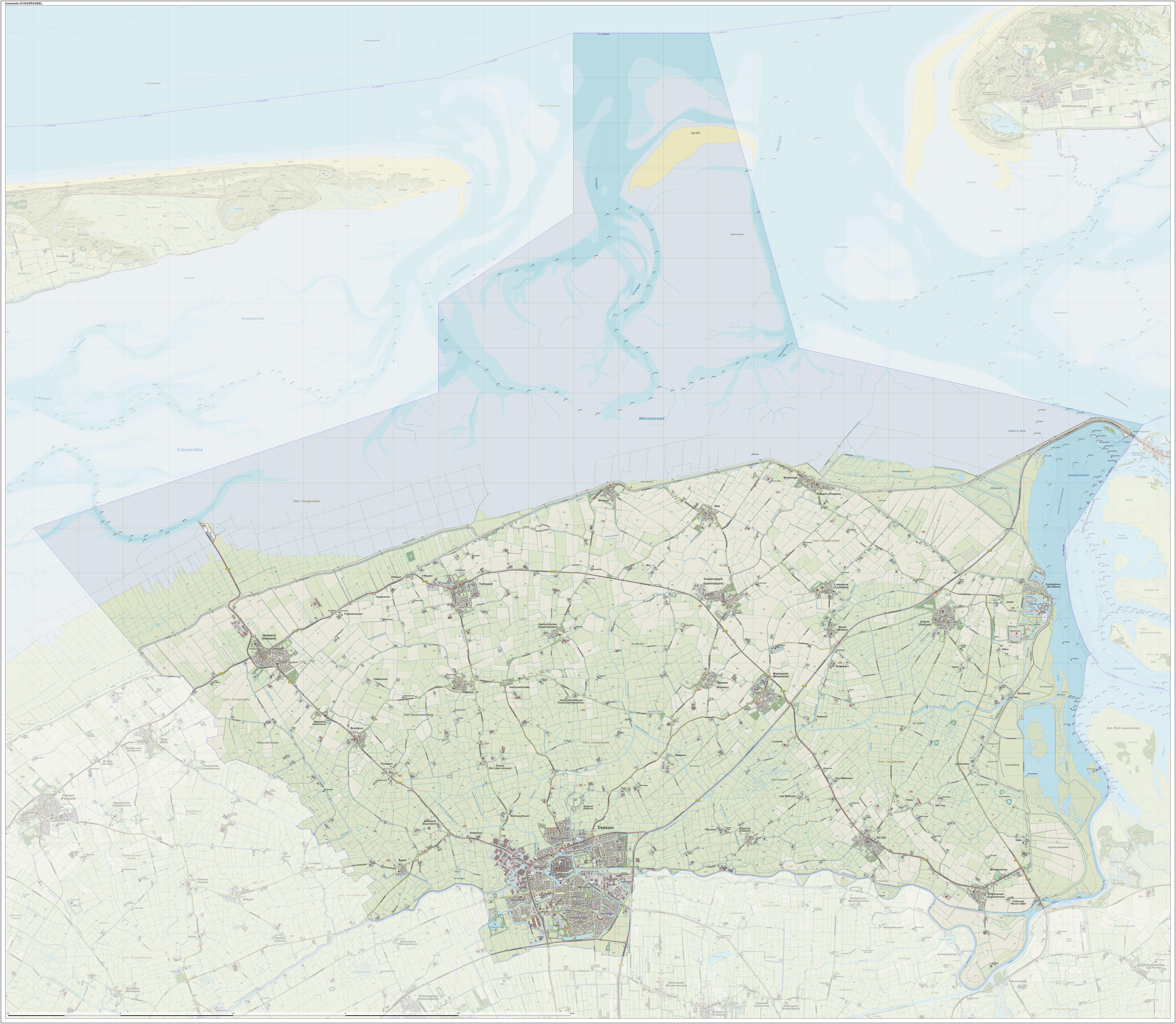

Dutch Topographic map of the municipality of Dongeradeel, June 2015.

== Notable people ==
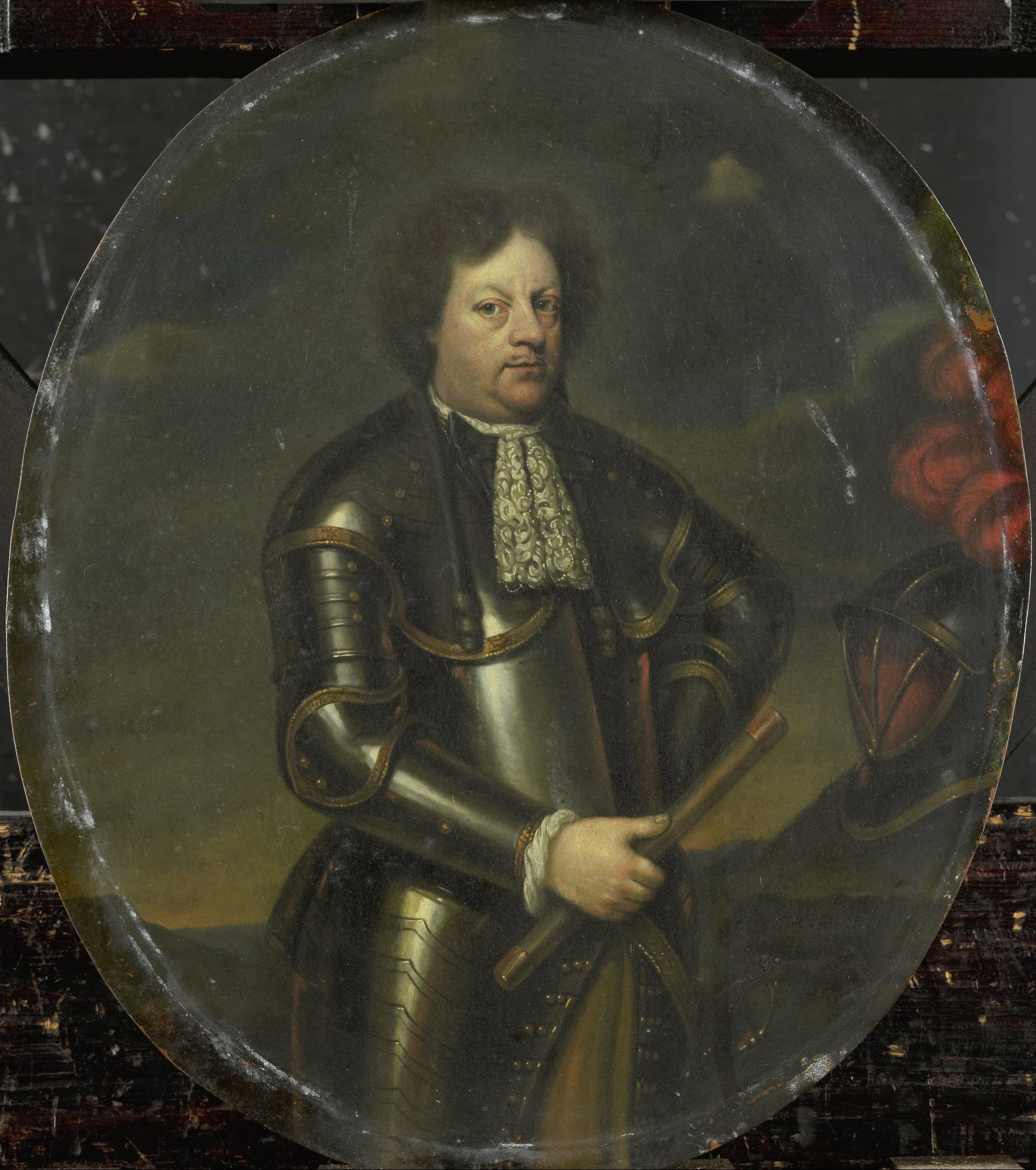
Hans Willem, Baron van Aylva

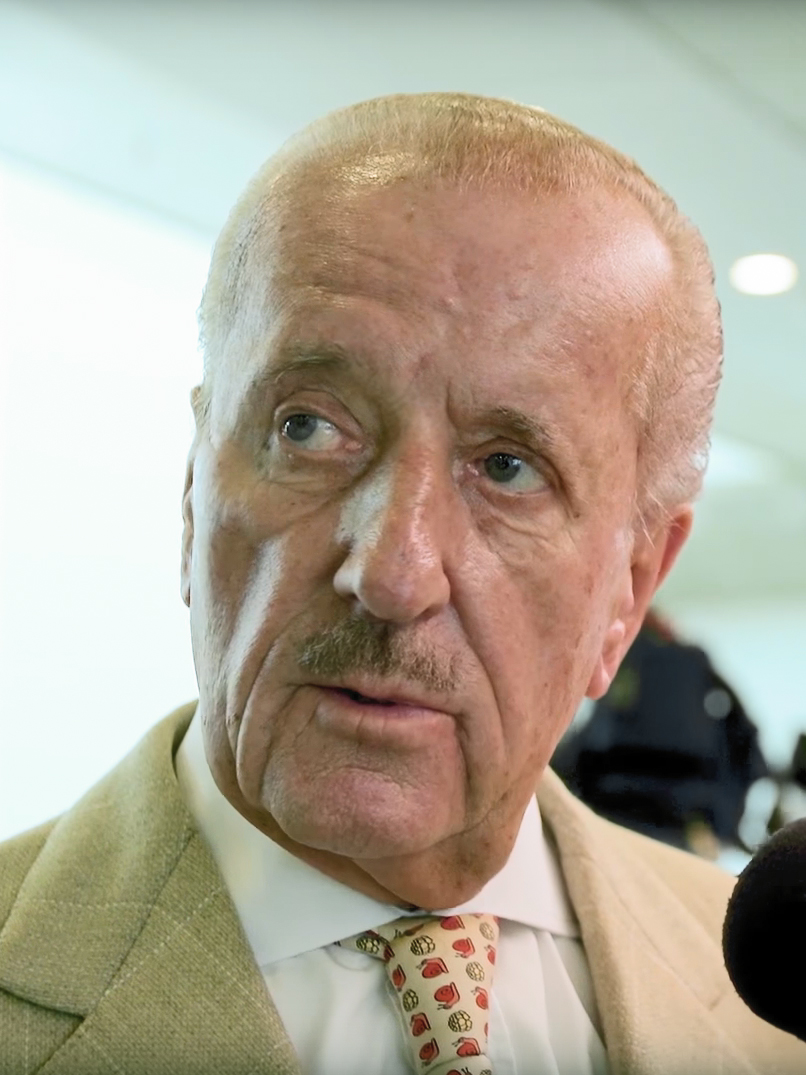
Theo Hiddema, 2018

- Ritske Jelmera (1383 in Ternaard - 1450) a Frisian chieftain who ruled the island of Ameland
- Johannes Phocylides Holwarda (1618 in Holwerd — 1651) a Frisian astronomer, physician, philosopher and academic
- Hans Willem van Aylva (ca.1633 in Holwerd - 1691) a Dutch soldier
- Balthasar Bekker (1634 in Metslawier – 1698) a Dutch minister and author of philosophical and theological works opposing superstition
- Nienke van Hichtum (1860 in Nes, Dongeradeel – 1939) a Frisian Dutch children's author
- Willem van der Woude (1876 in Oosternijkerk – 1974) a Dutch mathematician and academic
- Meindert DeJong (1906 in Wierum – 1991) a Dutch-born American writer of children's books
- Lou Dijkstra (1909 in Paesens – 1964) a Dutch speed skater, competed in the 1936 Winter Olympics
- Theo Hiddema (born 1944 in Holwerd) a Dutch lawyer, media personality and politician
- Sybe I. Rispens (born 1969 in Dokkum) a Dutch writer, scientist and entrepreneur
