= Waaxens =

Waaxens Waaksens
- Village
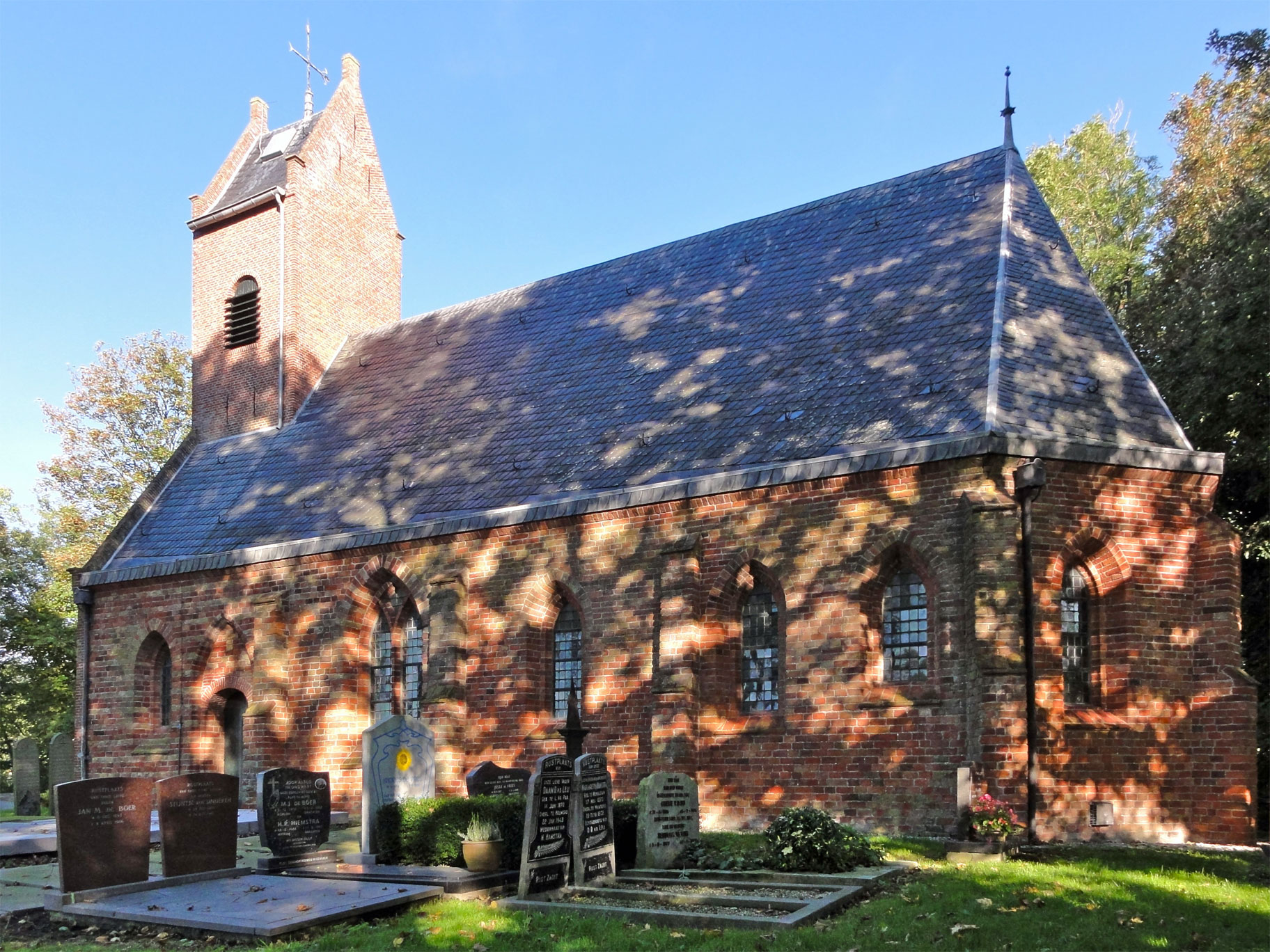
- St Thomas' church

- Flag Coat of arms

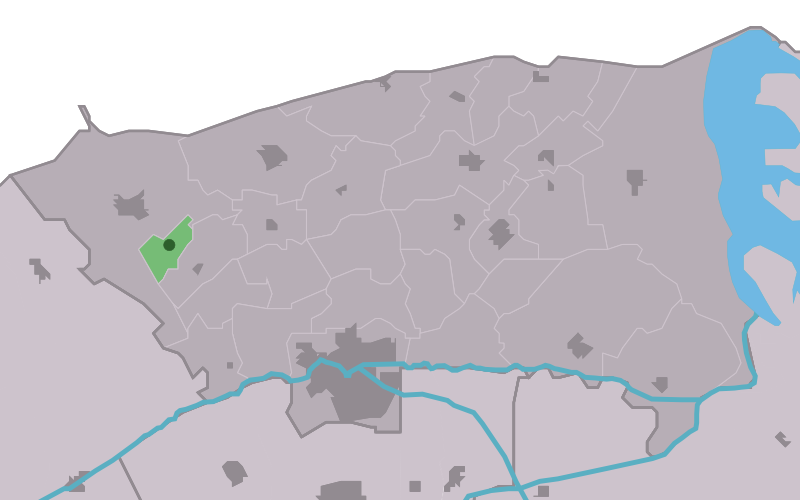
- Location in the former Dongeradeel municipality

- Location in the Netherlands Waaxens (Netherlands)
- Country: Netherlands
- Province: Friesland
- Municipality: Noardeast-Fryslân

Area
  - Total: 1.81 km^{2} (0.70 sq mi)
- Elevation: 0.4 m (1.3 ft)

Population (2021)
  - Total: 40
  - Density: 22/km^{2} (57/sq mi)
- Time zone: UTC+1 (CET)
  - Summer (DST): UTC+2 (CEST)
- Postal code: 9152
- Dialing code: 0519

Waaxens (West Frisian: Waaksens) is a small village in Noardeast-Fryslân municipality in the province of Friesland, the Netherlands. It had a population of only 35 in January 2017. Before 2019, the village was part of the Dongeradeel municipality.

The village was first mentioned between 825 and 842 as Wacheringe, and means "settlement of the people of Wachsa". Waaxens is a terp (artificial living mound) village with houses randomly scatter on terp. The Dutch Reformed church dates from the 12th century, but has been extensively modified in the 15th century. In 1840, it was home to 73 people.

In 2021, the municipality wanted to rename the village to West Frisian: Waaksens, however the plan was abandoned due to fierce resistance, because another village is named Waaksens.

== Gallery ==
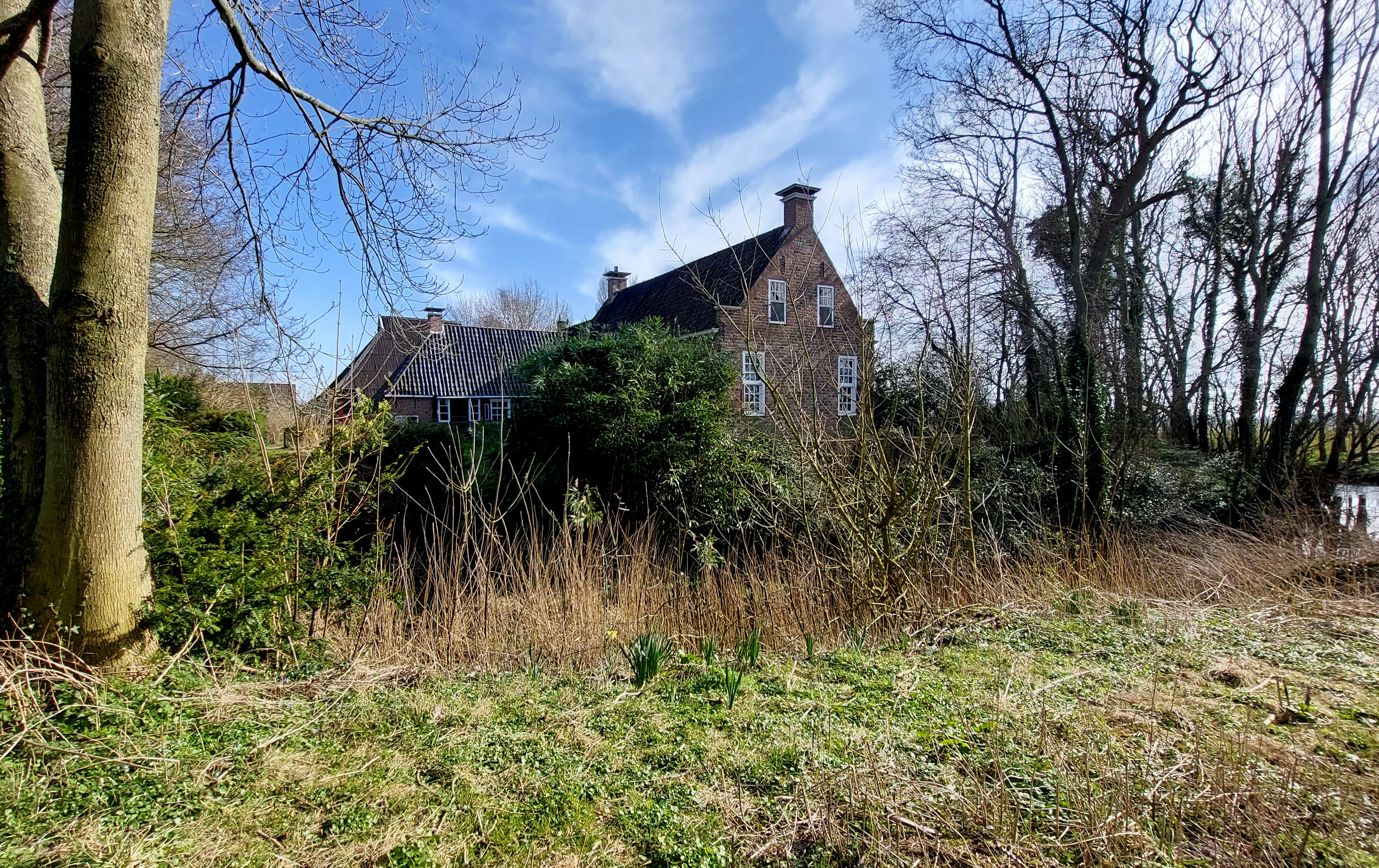
Farm in Waaxens

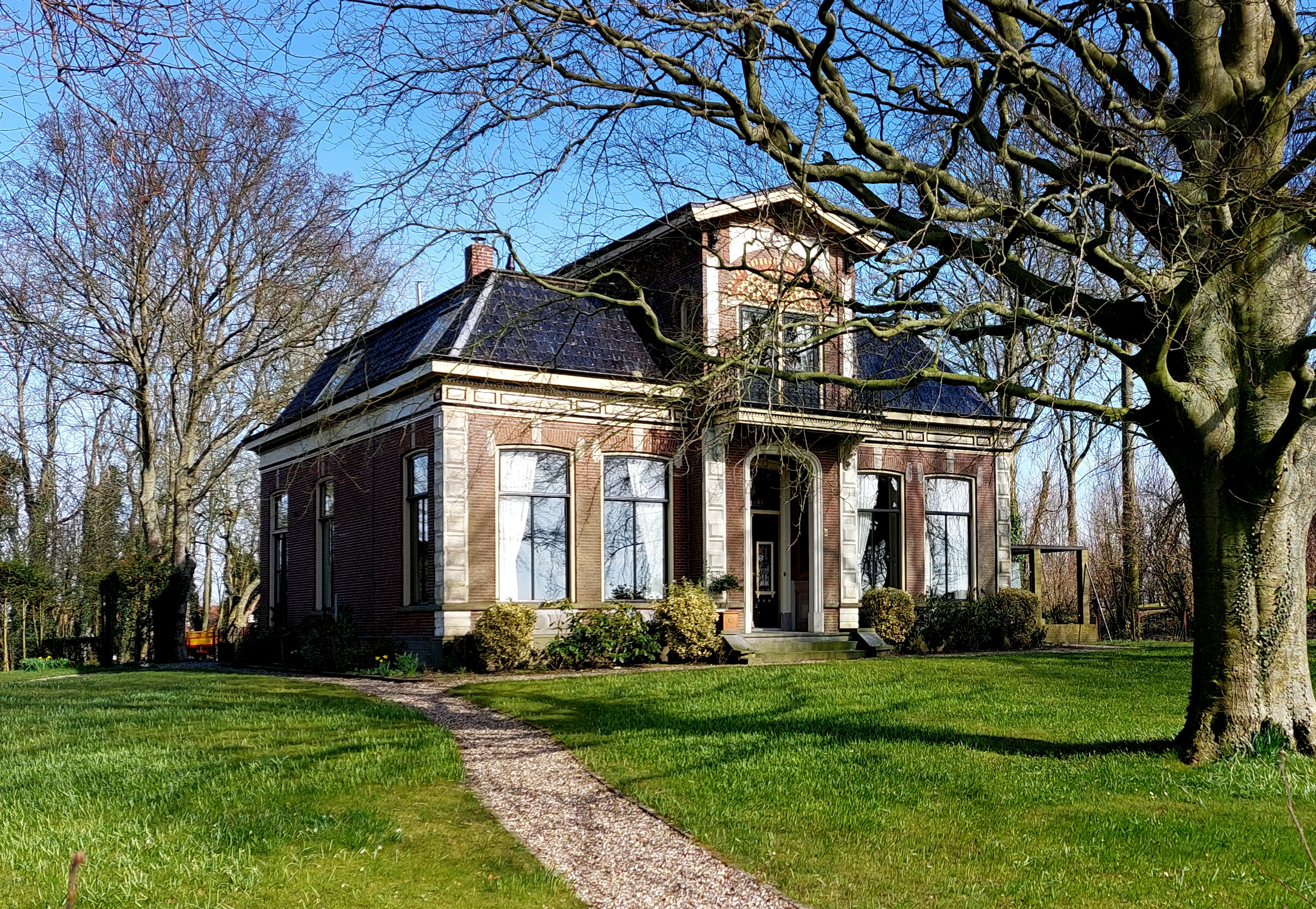
Clergy house

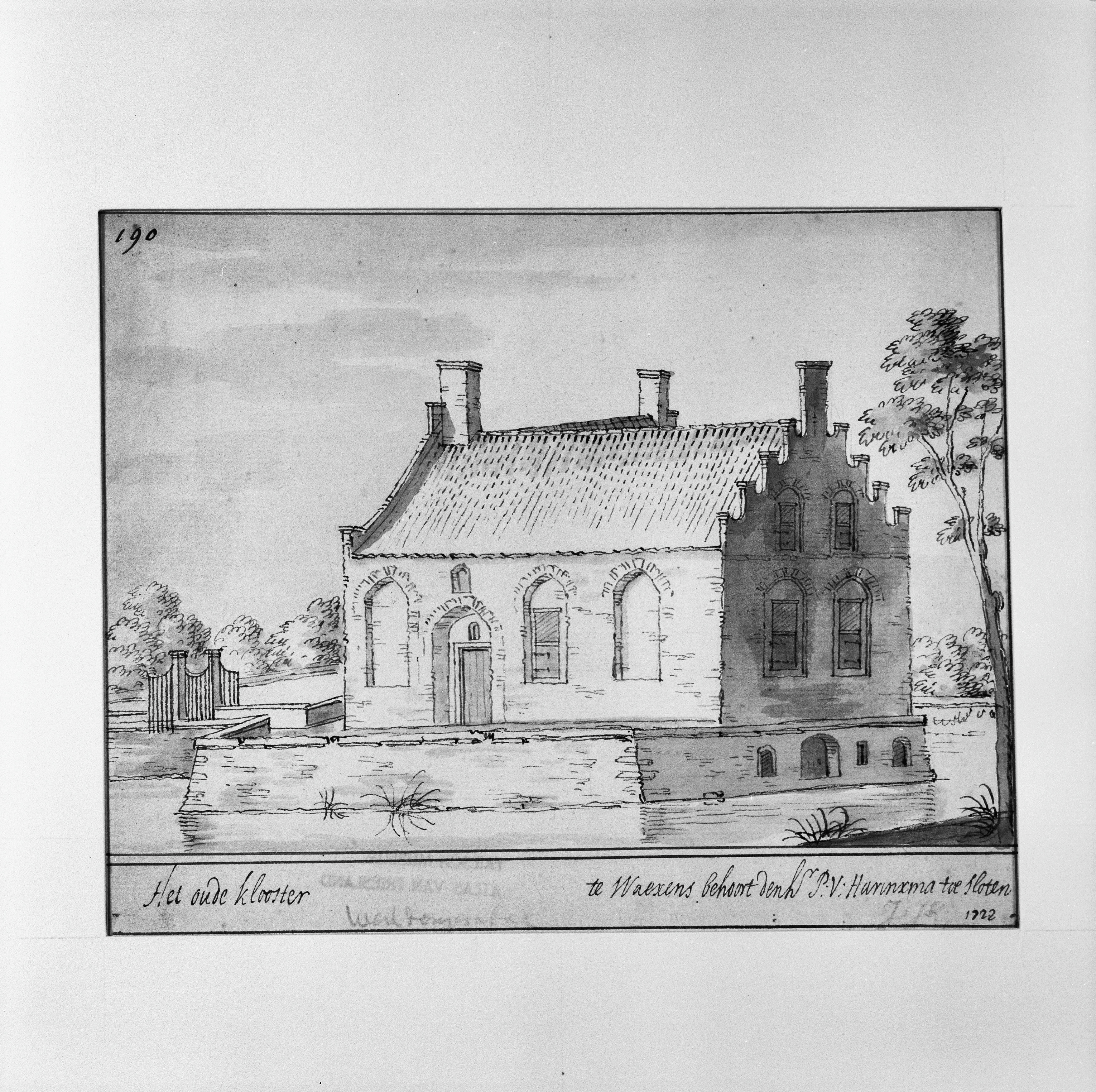
The Old Monastery (1722)

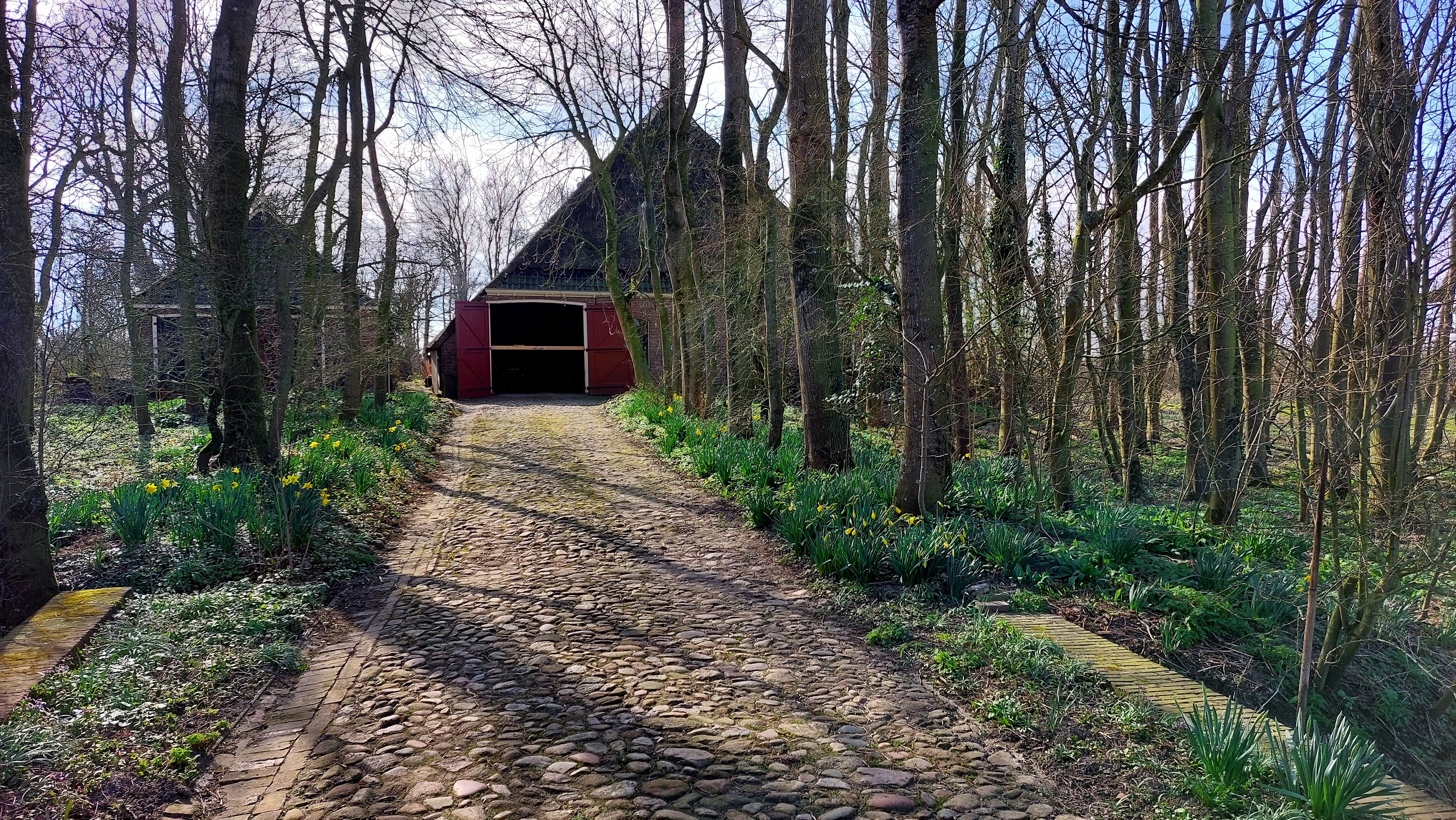
Farm in Waaxens
