= Brantgum =

- Village
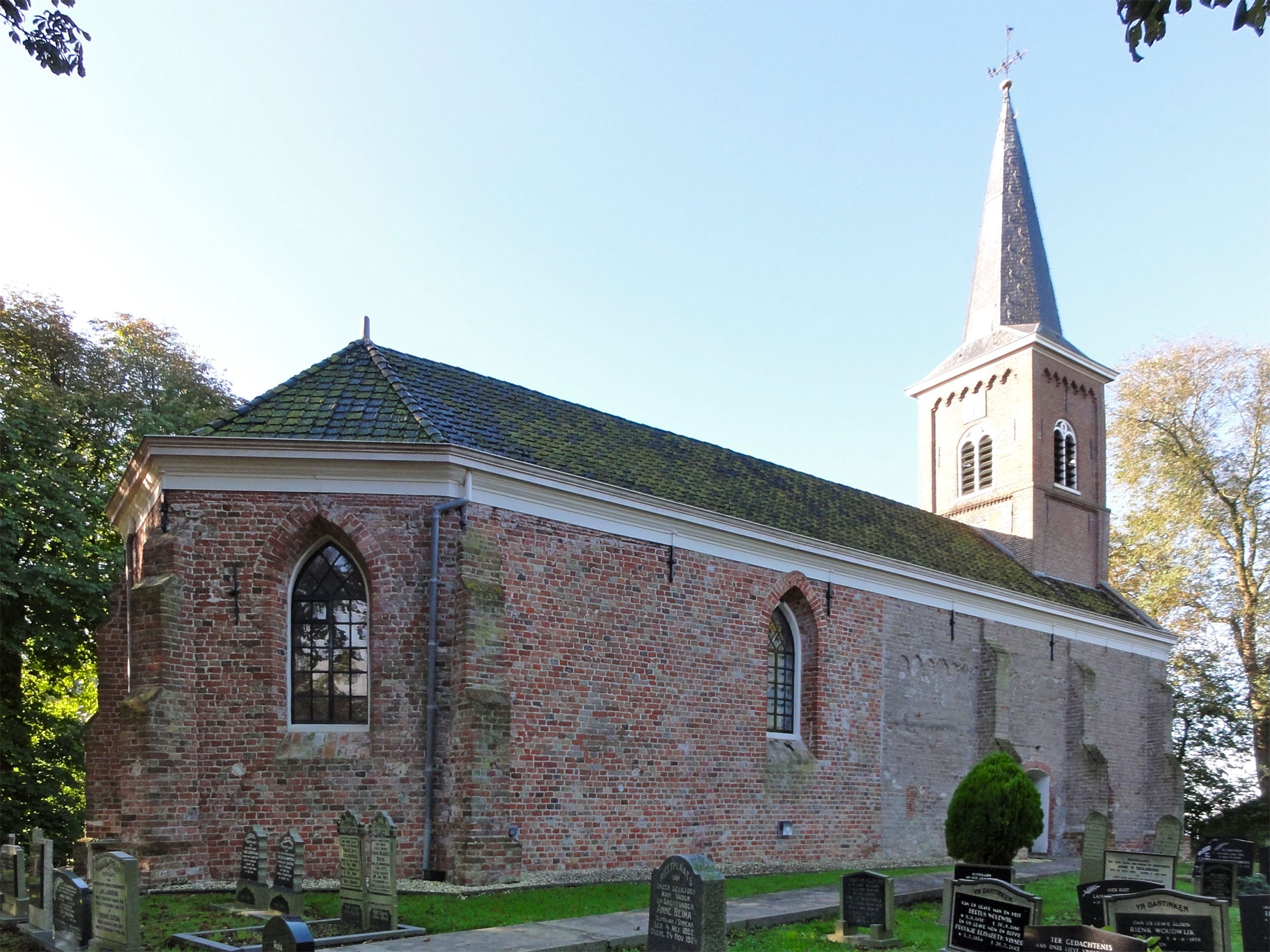
- Brantgum church

- Flag Coat of arms

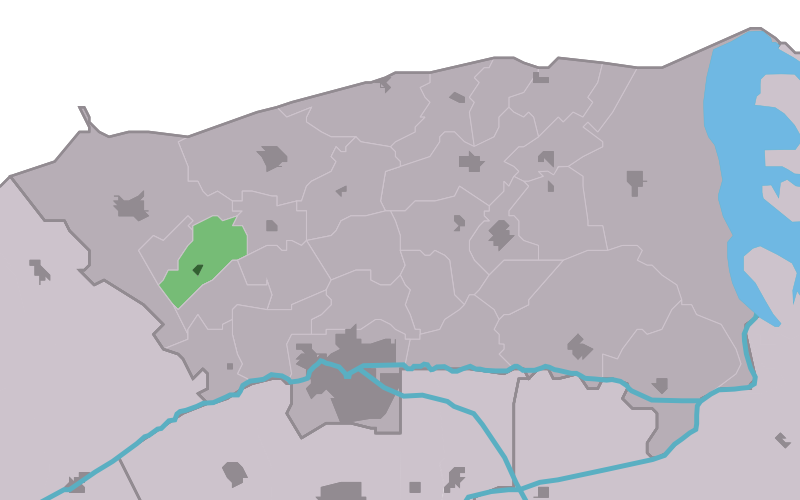
- Location in the former Dongeradeel municipality

- Location in the Netherlands Brantgum (Netherlands)
- Country: Netherlands
- Province: Friesland
- Municipality: Noardeast-Fryslân

Area
  - Total: 3.59 km^{2} (1.39 sq mi)
- Elevation: 0.8 m (2.6 ft)

Population (2021)
  - Total: 245
  - Density: 68.2/km^{2} (177/sq mi)
- Time zone: UTC+1 (CET)
  - Summer (DST): UTC+2 (CEST)
- Postal code: 9153
- Dialing code: 0519

Brantgum is a village in Noardeast-Fryslân in the province of Friesland, the Netherlands. It had a population of around 236 in January 2017. Before 2019, the village was part of the Dongeradeel municipality.

== History ==
The village was first mentioned in the 13th century as Brontegum, and means "settlement of the people of Brand (person)". Brantgum is a terp (artificial living mound) village with a radial structure which probably dates from several centuries Before Christ. The Dutch Reformed church dates from the 12th century and was extended during the 15th and 16th century. Between 1876 and 1877, the neoclassical tower was added.

In 1840, Brantgum was home to 295 people. In 1852, the terp was cut in two by the construction of the main road from Dokkum to Holwerd. The southern part of the terp was excavated during the late-19th century. Brantgum probably had a school since 1540, however it was closed in 2014–2015 due to lack of students.

== Notable people ==
- Ids Wiersma (1878–1965), painter and draughtsman

== Gallery ==
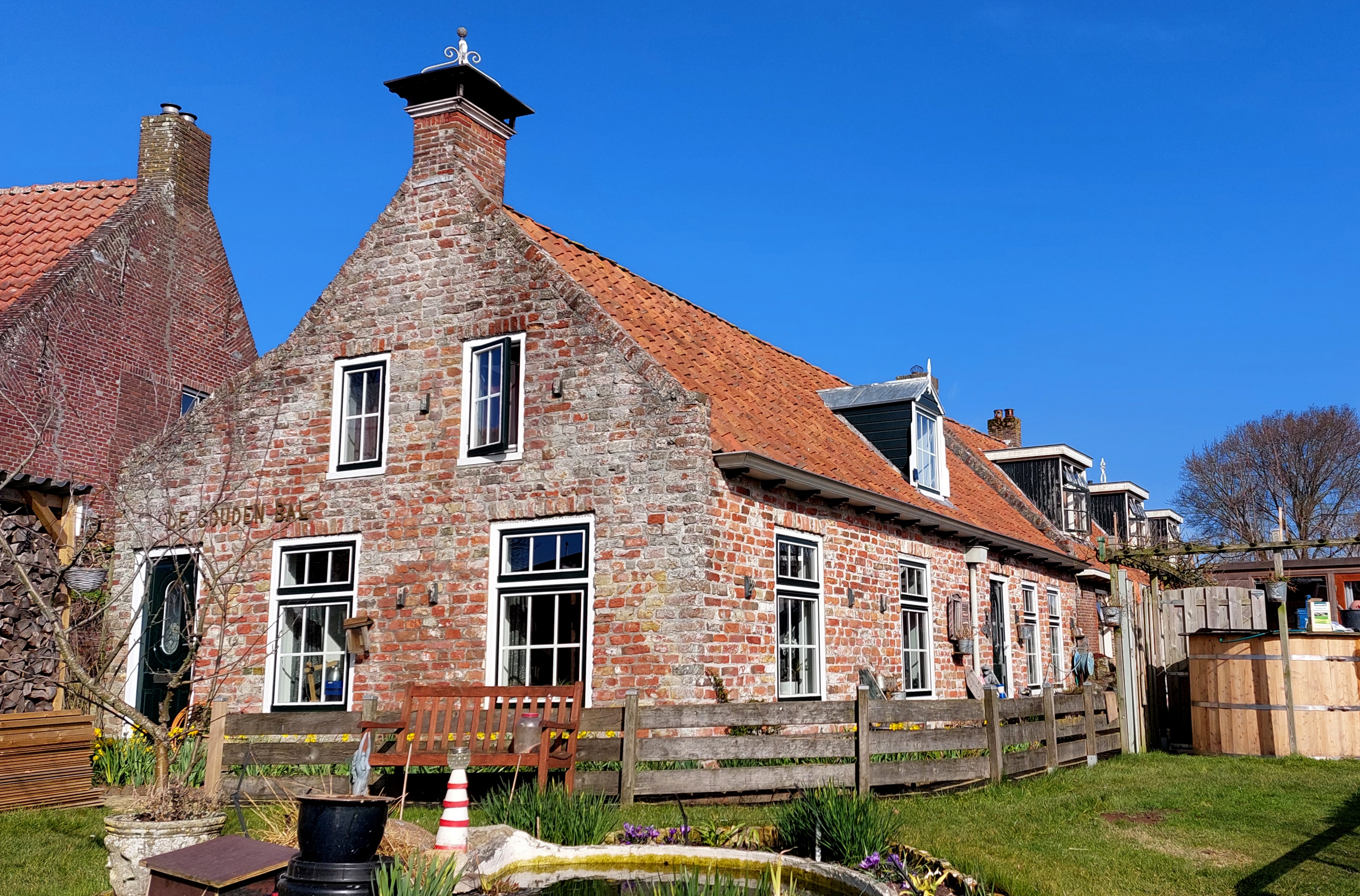
Houses in Brantgum

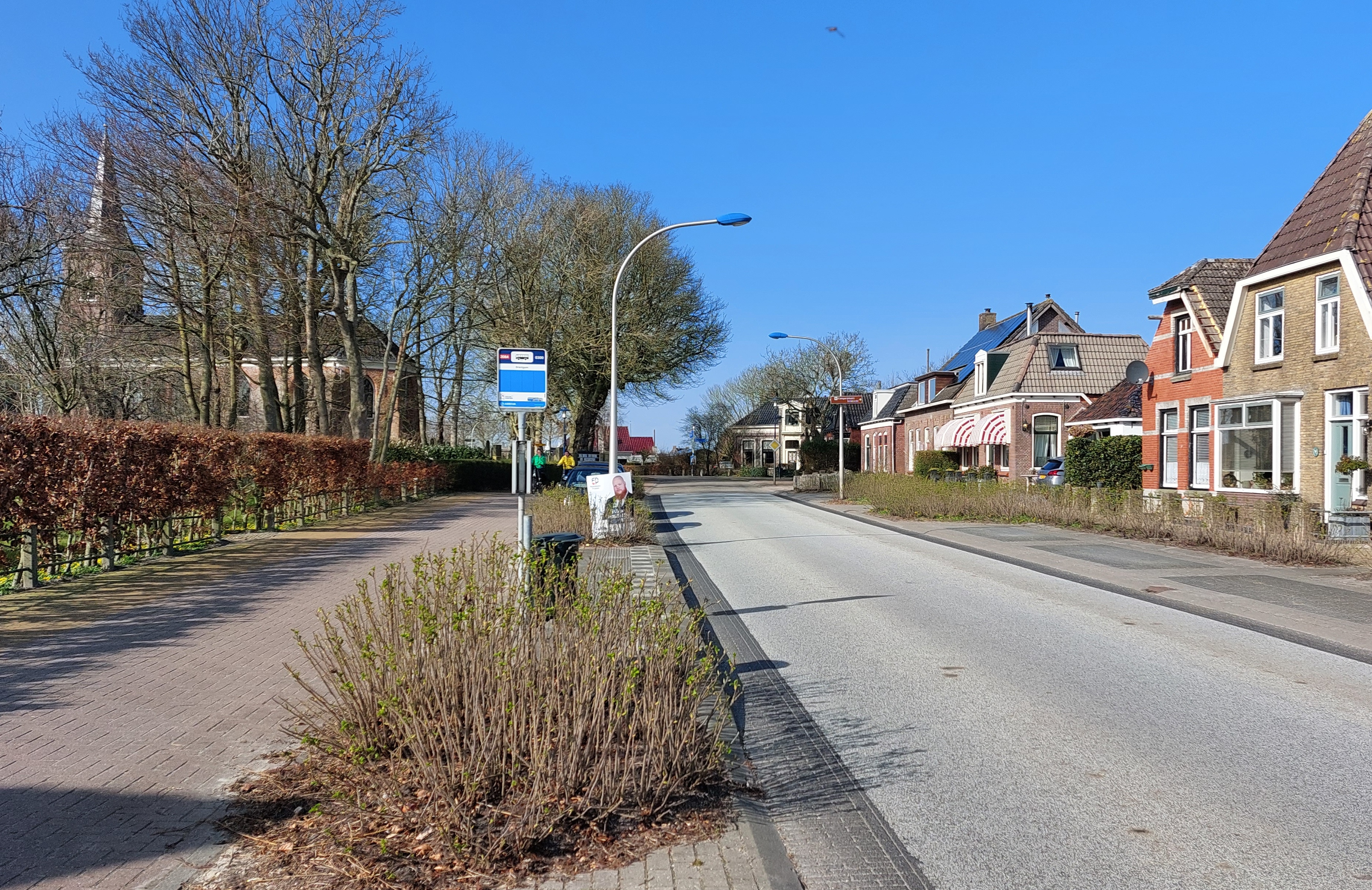
Main road

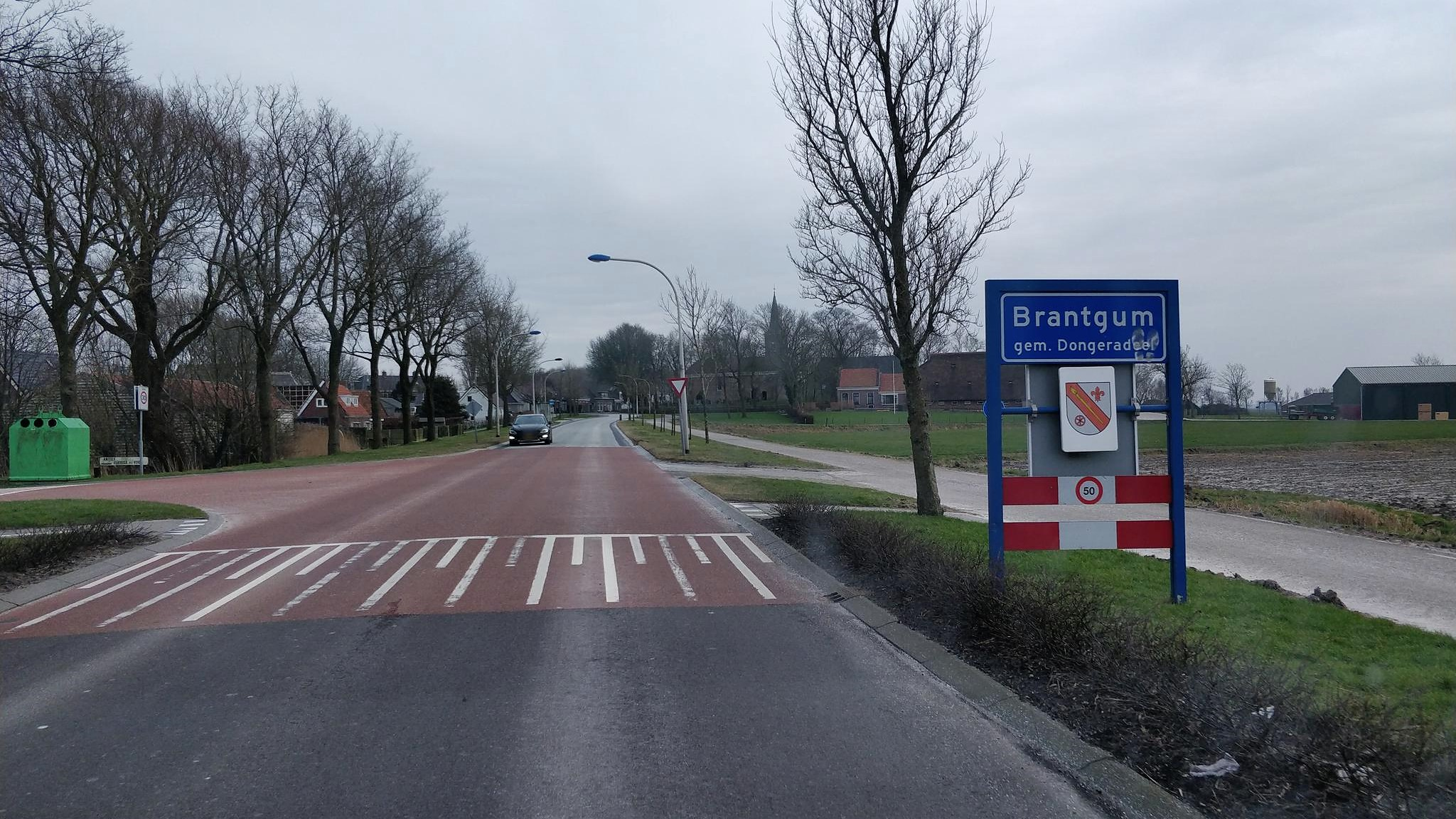
Welcome to Brantgum

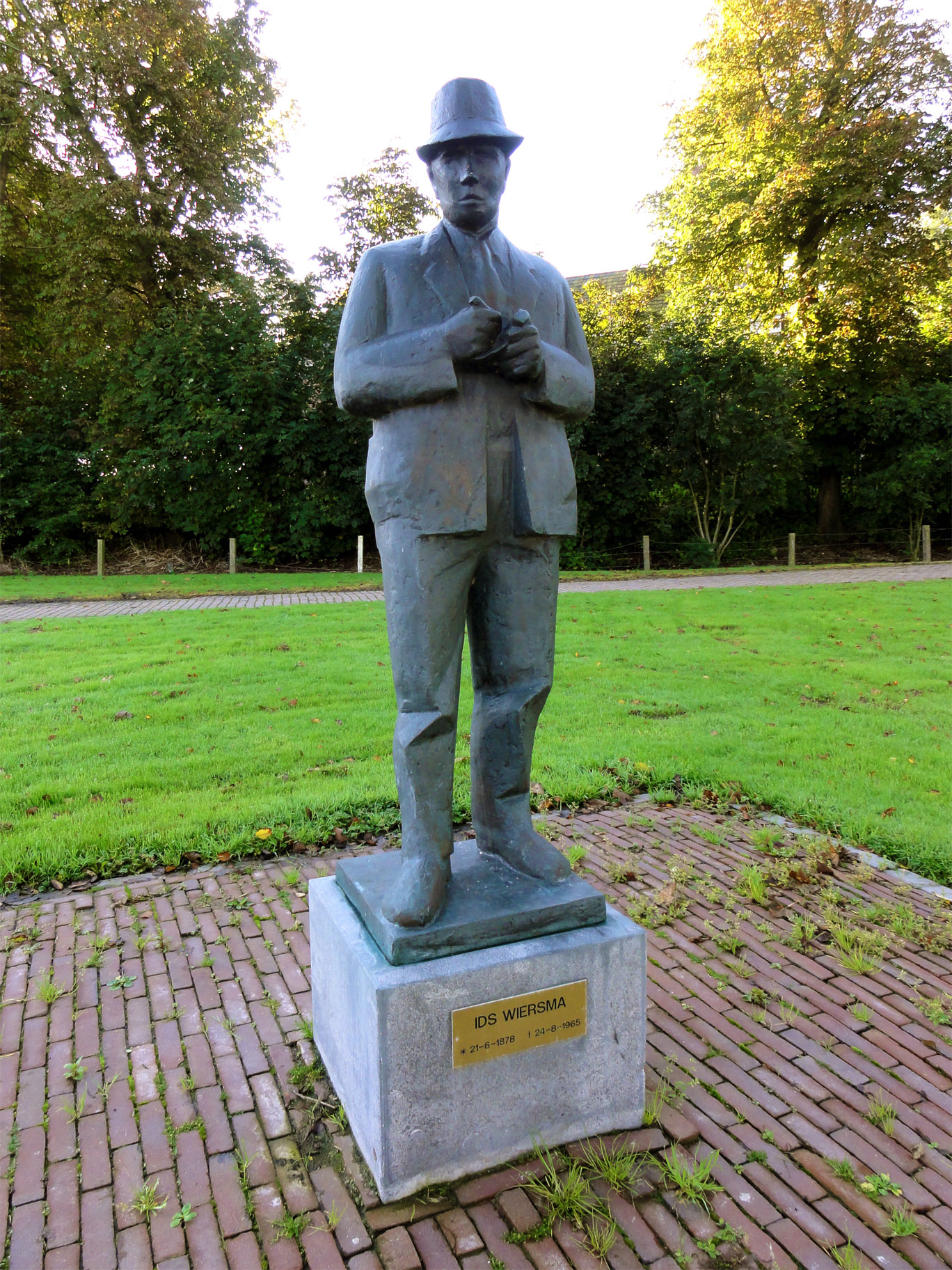
Statue of Ids Wiersma by Gosse Dam
