= Boarnwert =

- Village
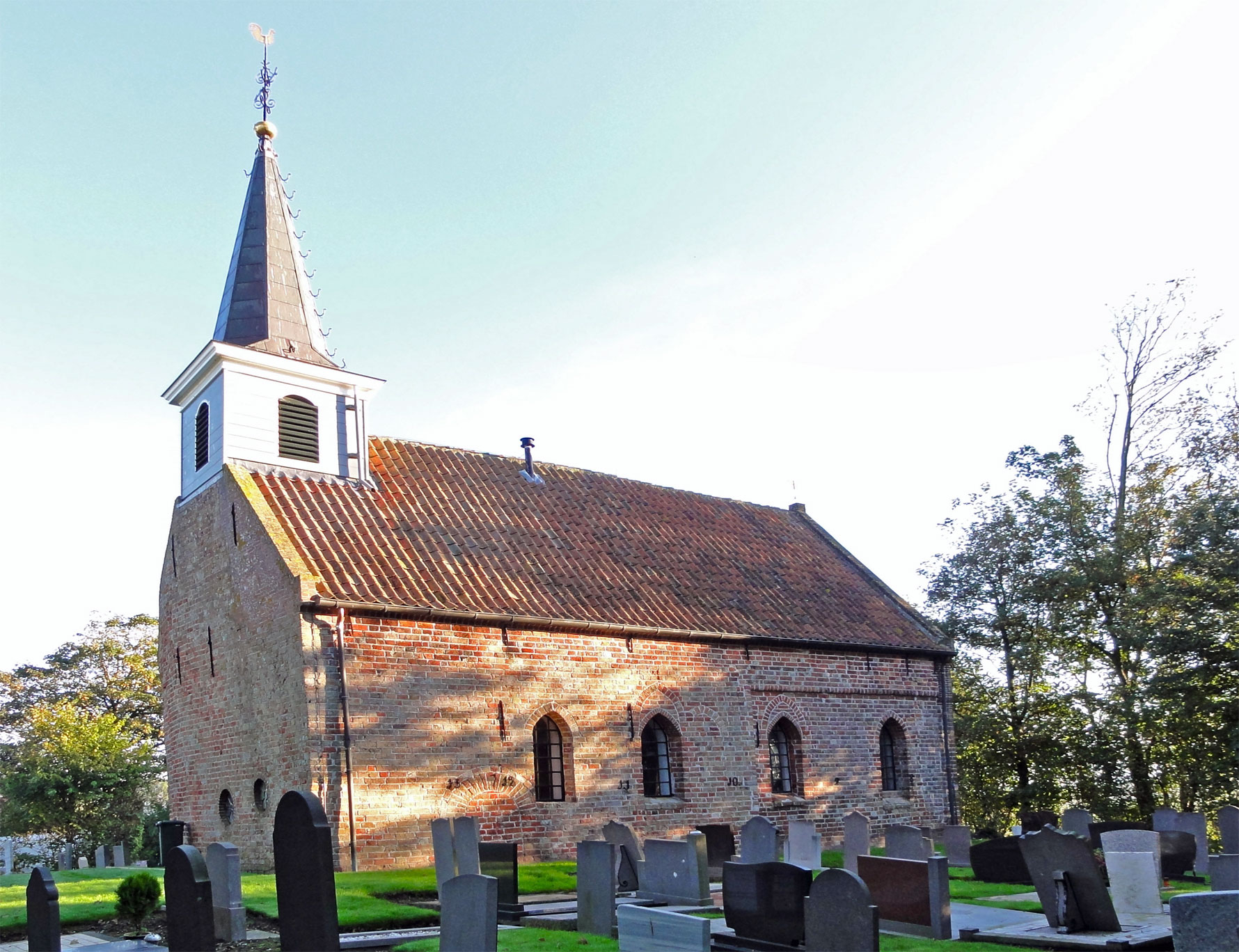
- St Mary's church

- Flag Coat of arms

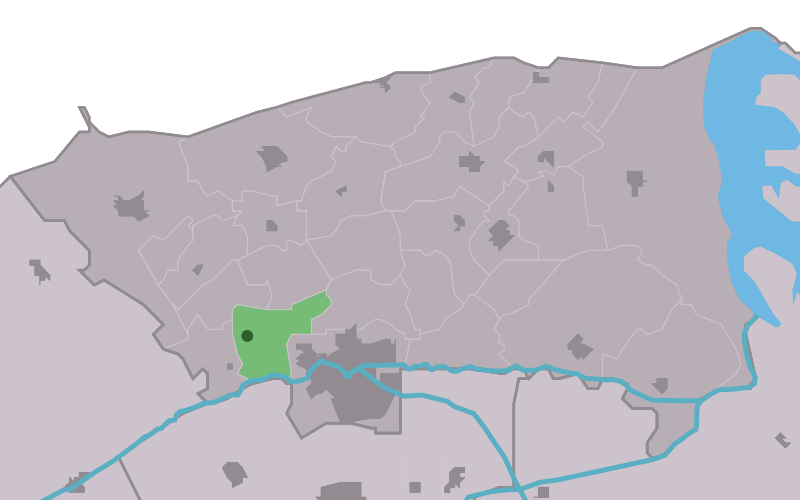
- Location in the former Dongeradeel municipality

- Location in the Netherlands Boarnwert (Netherlands)
- Country: Netherlands
- Province: Friesland
- Municipality: Noardeast-Fryslân

Area
  - Total: 4.32 km^{2} (1.67 sq mi)
- Elevation: 0.5 m (1.6 ft)

Population (2021)
  - Total: 120
  - Density: 28/km^{2} (72/sq mi)
- Time zone: UTC+1 (CET)
  - Summer (DST): UTC+2 (CEST)
- Postal code: 9156
- Dialing code: 0519

Boarnwert (Dutch: Bornwird) is a small village in Noardeast-Fryslân in the province of Friesland, the Netherlands. It had a population of around 119 in January 2017. Before 2019, the village was part of the Dongeradeel municipality.

The village was first mentioned in 944 as Brunnenuur, and means "terp with a spring". The Dutch Reformed church was built in the 13th century. In 1840, it was home to 84 people.

In 1910, the terp of Boarnwert was excavated and prehistoric urns were discovered. In 1966 and 1967, archaeological excavation was performed in Boarnwert during the construction of the Holwert to Dokkum road. A stone axe, flint artefacts, and potsherds were discovered from the Late Bronze Age proving that the most northern area which was regularly flooded had been settled for a long time.

The village's official name was changed from Bornwird to Boarnwert in 2023.
