= Ljussens =

- Village
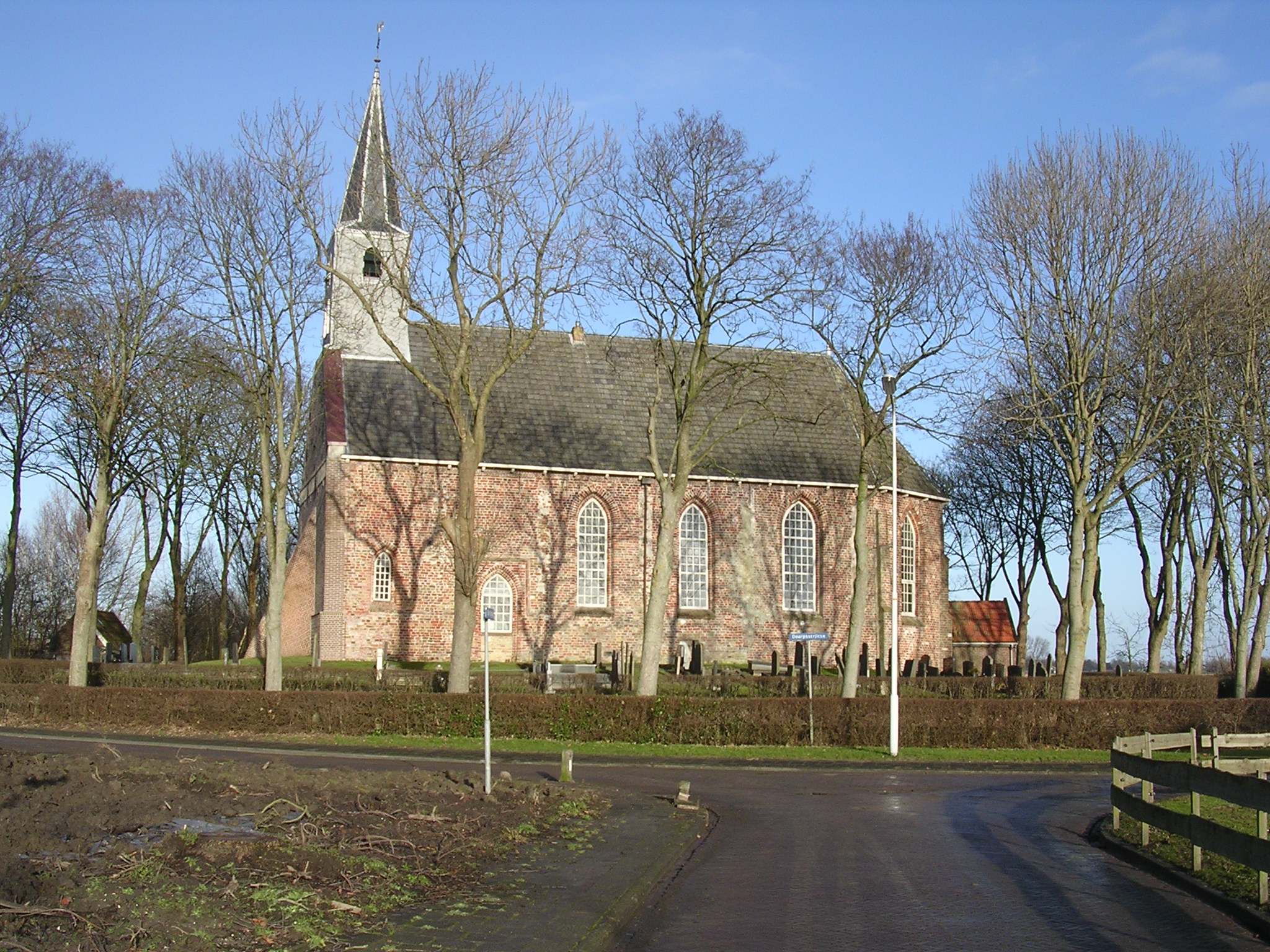
- Ljussens church

- Flag Coat of arms

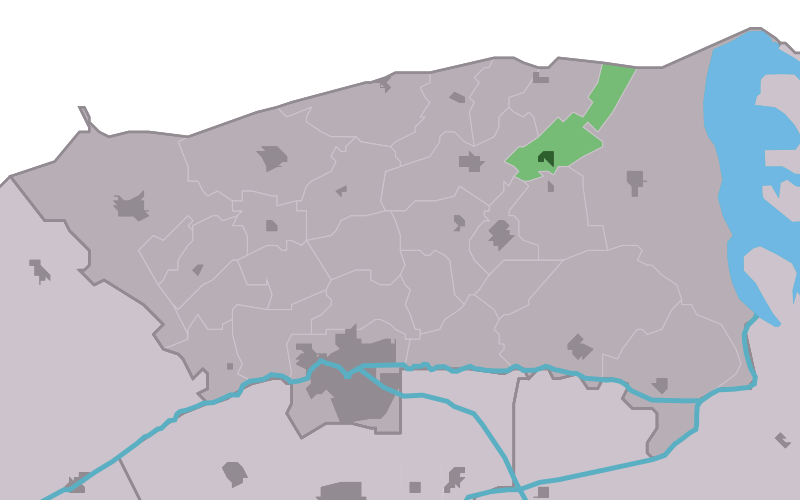
- Location in the former Dongeradeel municipality

- Location in the Netherlands Ljussens (Netherlands)
- Country: Netherlands
- Province: Friesland
- Municipality: Noardeast-Fryslân

Area
  - Total: 4.57 km^{2} (1.76 sq mi)
- Elevation: 0.5 m (1.6 ft)

Population (2021)
  - Total: 380
  - Density: 83/km^{2} (220/sq mi)
- Time zone: UTC+1 (CET)
  - Summer (DST): UTC+2 (CEST)
- Postal code: 9134
- Dialing code: 0519

Ljussens (Dutch: Lioessens) is a village in Noardeast-Fryslân in the province of Friesland, the Netherlands. It had a population of around 348 in January 2017. Before 2019, the village was part of the Dongeradeel municipality.

The village was first mentioned in 1401 as Luscens, and means "people of Liusse (Liutfrid)". The Dutch Reformed church dates from the 13th century. Around 1480, it was enlarged and received a five-sided choir. In 1840, Ljussens was home to 439 people.

The village's official name was changed from Lioessens to Ljussens in 2023.

== Gallery ==
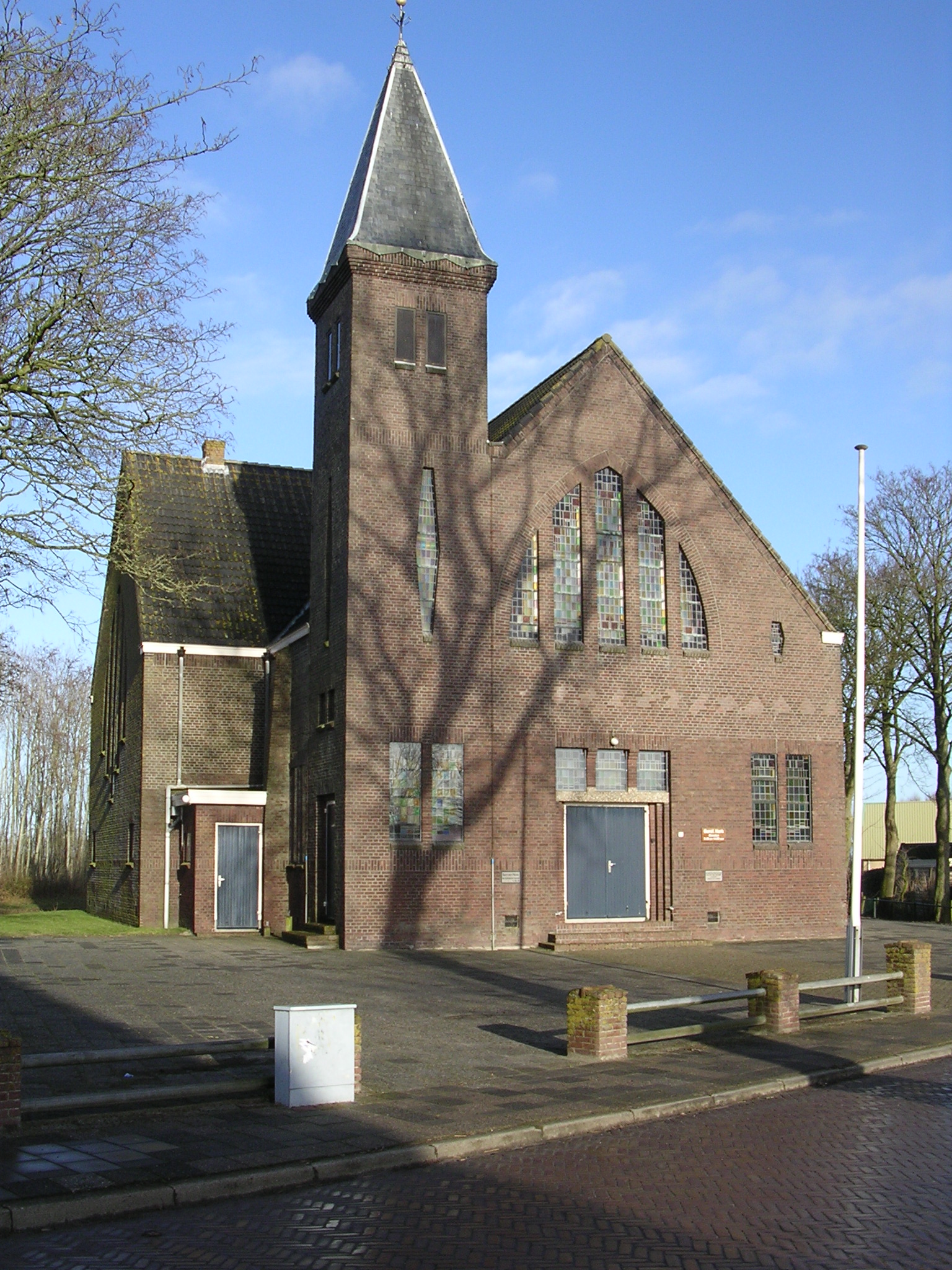
Protestant church

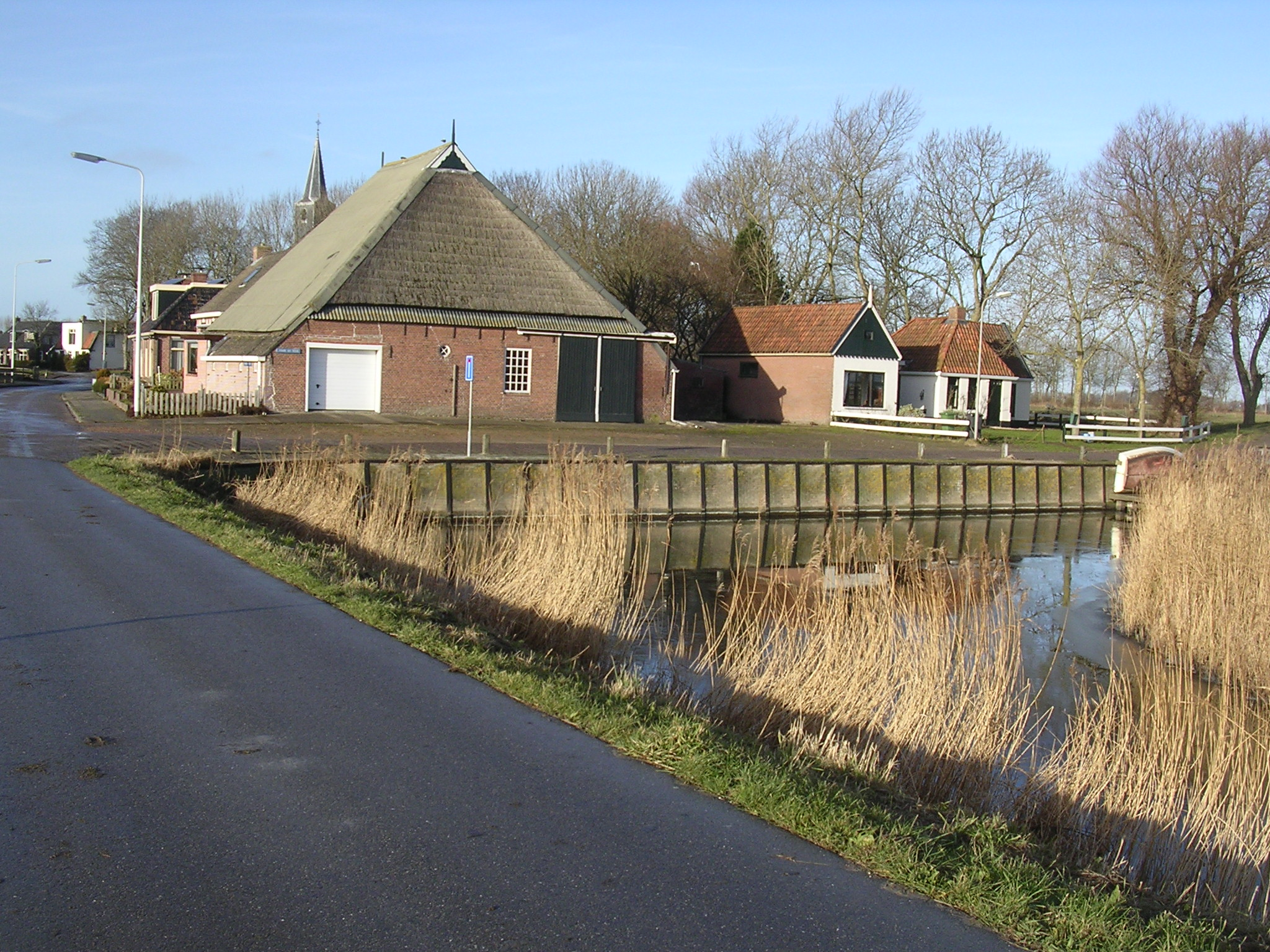
Village view

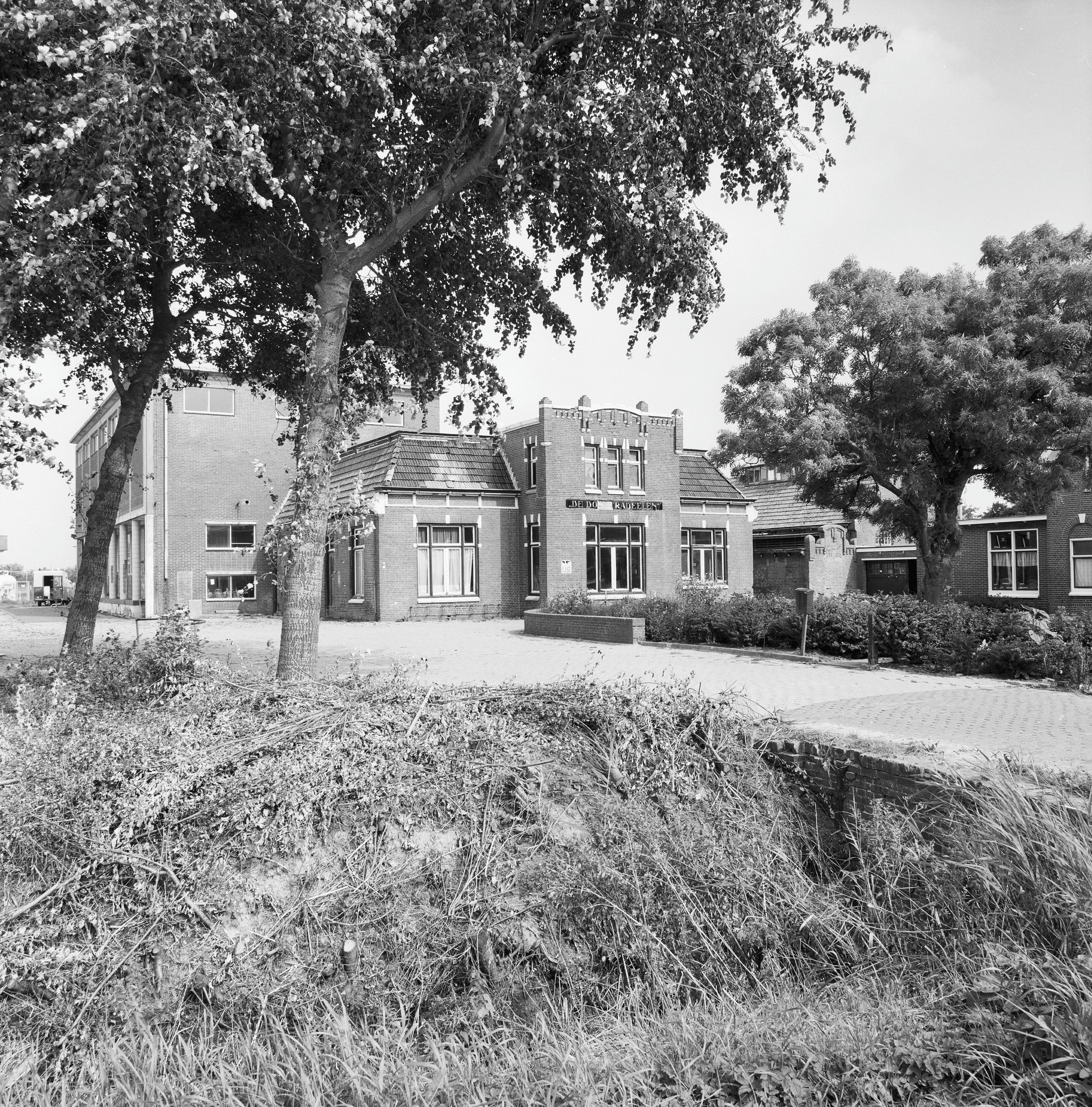
Former dairy factory
