= Stichting Alde Fryske Tsjerken =

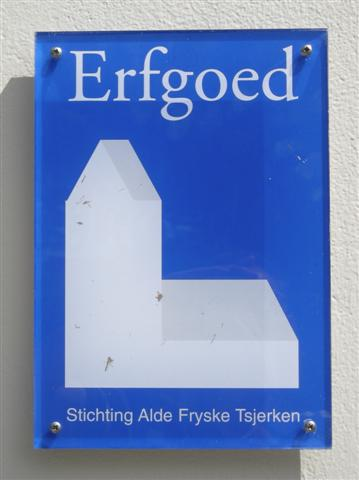
Emblem for churches in the care of the foundation

Stichting Alde Fryske Tsjerken (English: Old Frisian Churches Foundation) is a foundation which aims to preserve church buildings in Friesland, the Netherlands.

The foundation owns 38 churches as for 2010. It was established in 1970 and is based in Leeuwarden, the capital of the province. All churches in the care of the foundation are Rijksmonuments, which is a condition for the foundation for newly acquired churches. The churches are maintained with subsidy from the Rijksdienst voor het Cultureel Erfgoed, the province Friesland, municipalities, several culturefunds and public gifts.

== Churches ==
Location	Article	Photograph	Rijksmonument nr.
Allingawier			39320
Augsbuurt			23752
Beers	Protestant church of Bears		8470
Blessum			28581
Boer			15850
Boksum			28584
Bornwird			38694
Britsum			24525
Britswert			8483
Finkum			24529
Foudgum			38697
Ginnum			15615
Hantumhuizen	Protestant church of Hantumhuizen		38700
Hijum			24531
Hogebeintum			15628
Holwerd			38706
Jorwert	Protestant church of Jorwert		8494
Jouswier			31575
Katlijk			21180
Kortezwaag			
Lichtaard			15633
Olterterp			31862
Oostrum			31590
Peins			15862
Raard			38730
Schalsum			15867
Schurega			21179
Sint Jacobiparochie			9511
Swichum	Protestant church of Swichum		24519
Sibrandahûs			11698
Ter Idzard			38861
Terband			21198
Uitwellingerga			39821
Westhem			39822
Westernijtsjerk			15645
Wier			28626
Zweins			15878
