= Protestant church of Swichum =

Church in Swichum, Netherlands

Coordinates: 53°09′13″N 5°49′07″E

Protestant church of Swichum Saint Nicholas church
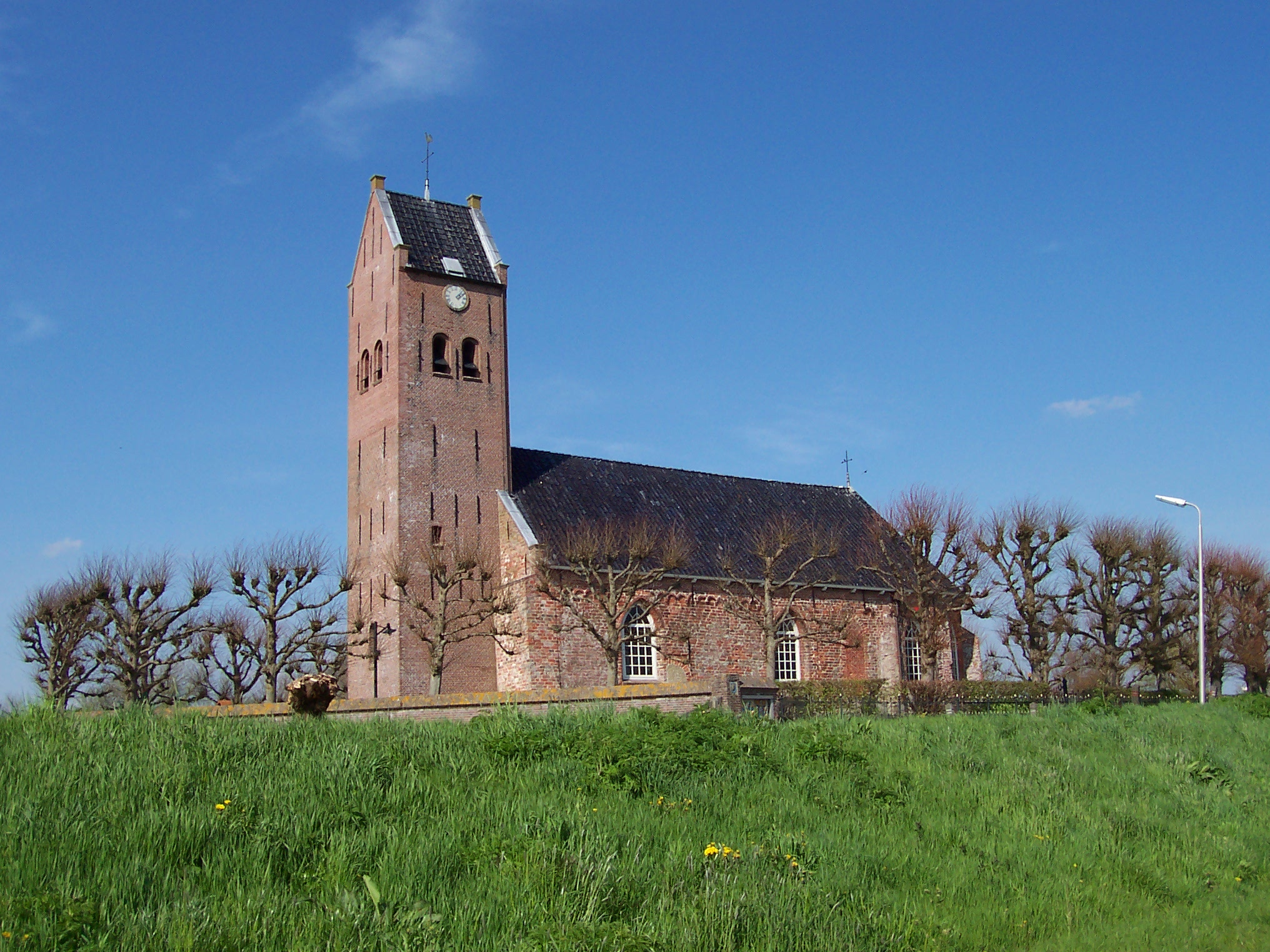
- Church of Swichum
- Protestant church of Swichum; Saint Nicholas church

History
- Dedication: Before the Reformation, to Saint Nicholas

Specifications
- Materials: Brick

The Protestant church of Swichum or Saint Nicholas Church is a religious building in Swichum, Netherlands, one of the many medieval churches in Friesland.

The nave was built in the 13th century and the semicircular choir dates from the late 13th century; both are built out of red brick. The tower was built in the 14th century and the furniture in the church dates from the 19th century.

The building is located on the Ayttadyk 3 and was once a Roman Catholic church dedicated to Saint Nicholas but became a Protestant church after the Protestant Reformation. It is listed as a Rijksmonument, number 24519, and is rated with a very high historical value and is in the care of Stichting Alde Fryske Tsjerken (Old Frisian Churches Foundation).
