= Viglius =

Dutch statesman and jurist

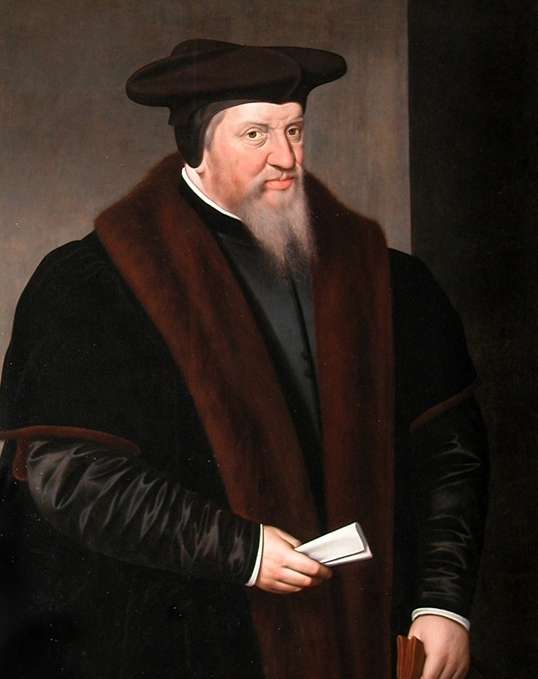
Portrait of Viglius by Frans Pourbus the Elder

Viglius (October 19, 1507, Swichum – May 5, 1577) was the name taken by Wigle Aytta van Zwichem, a Dutch statesman and jurist, a Frisian by birth.

== Biography ==
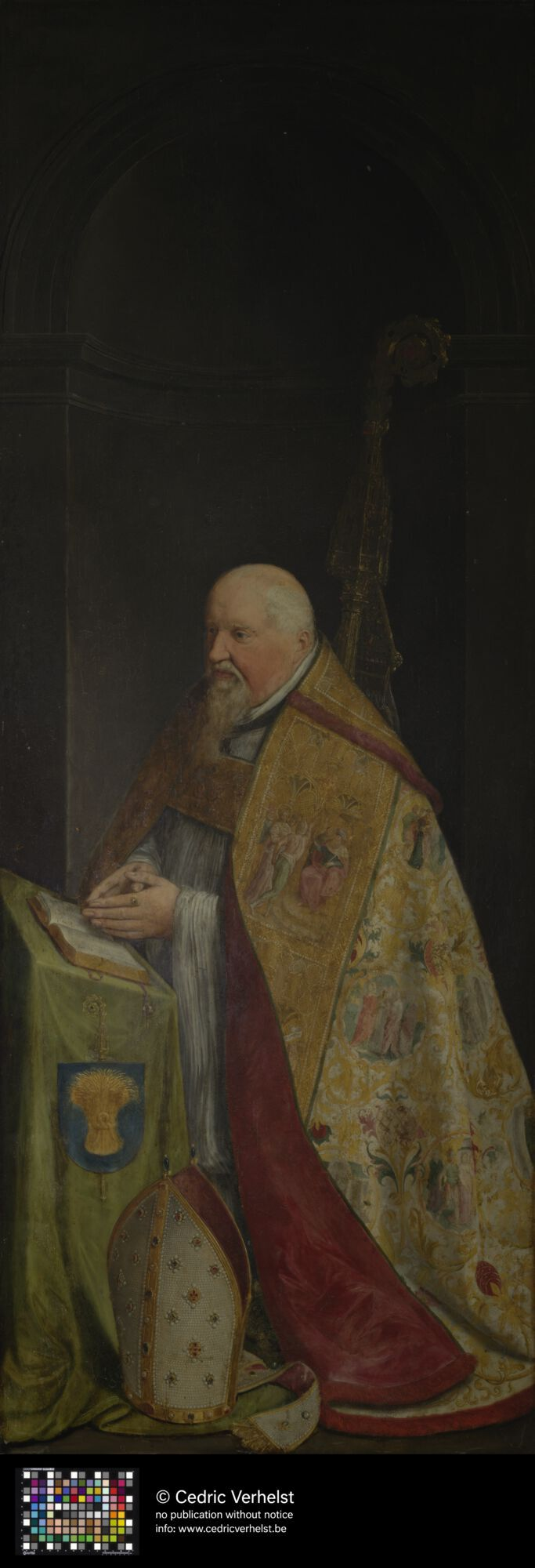
The Viglius Triptych by Frans Pourbus the Elder in Saint Bavo's Cathedral, Ghent

Viglis studied at various universities—Leuven, Dole and Bourges among others—devoting himself mainly to the study of jurisprudence, and afterwards visited many of the principal seats of learning in Europe. His great abilities attracted the notice of Erasmus and other celebrated men, and his renown was soon wide and general.

Having lectured on law at the universities of Bourges and Padua, he accepted a judicial position under the bishop of Münster which he resigned in 1535 to become assessor of the imperial court of justice (Reichskammergericht). He would not, however, undertake the post of tutor to Philip, son of Emperor Charles V. Nor would he accept any of the many lucrative and honorable positions offered him by various European princes, preferring instead to remain at the University of Ingolstadt, where for five years he occupied a professorial chair.

In 1542 the official connection of Viglius with the Netherlands began. At the emperor's invitation he became a member of the council of Mechelen, and some years later president of that body. Other responsible positions were entrusted to him, and he was soon one of the most trusted of the ministers of Charles V, whom he accompanied during the War of the League of Schmalkalden in 1546. His rapid rise in the emperor's favor was probably due to his immense store of learning, which was useful in asserting the imperial rights where disputes arose between the empire and the estates.

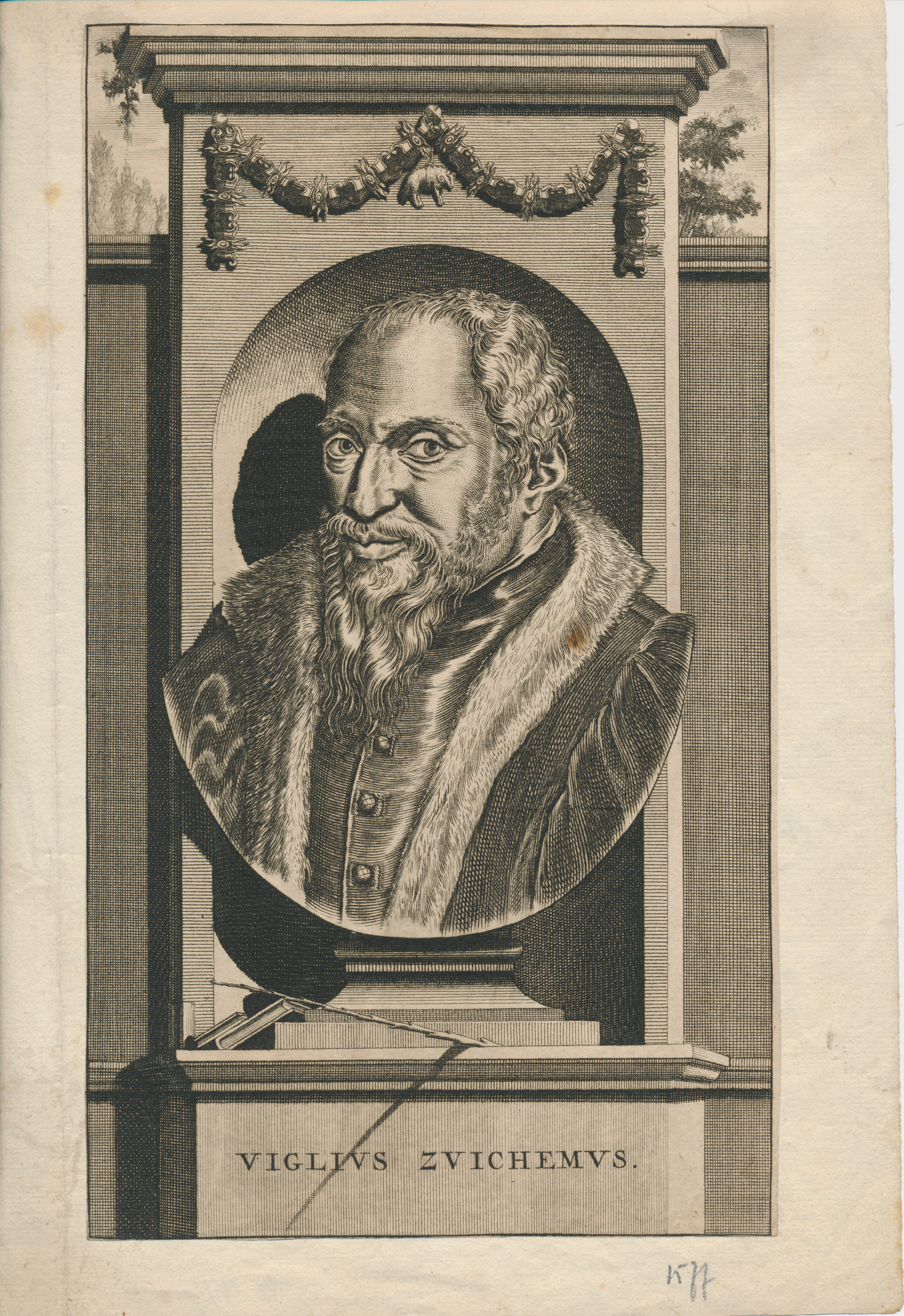

He was generally regarded as the author of the edict against toleration issued in 1550. A charge which he denied, maintaining, on the contrary, that he had vainly tried to induce Charles to modify its rigour. When the emperor abdicated in 1555 Viglius was anxious to retire also, but at the instance of King Philip II he remained at his post and was rewarded by being made coadjutor abbot of Saint Bavo's Cathedral of Ghent, and in other ways.

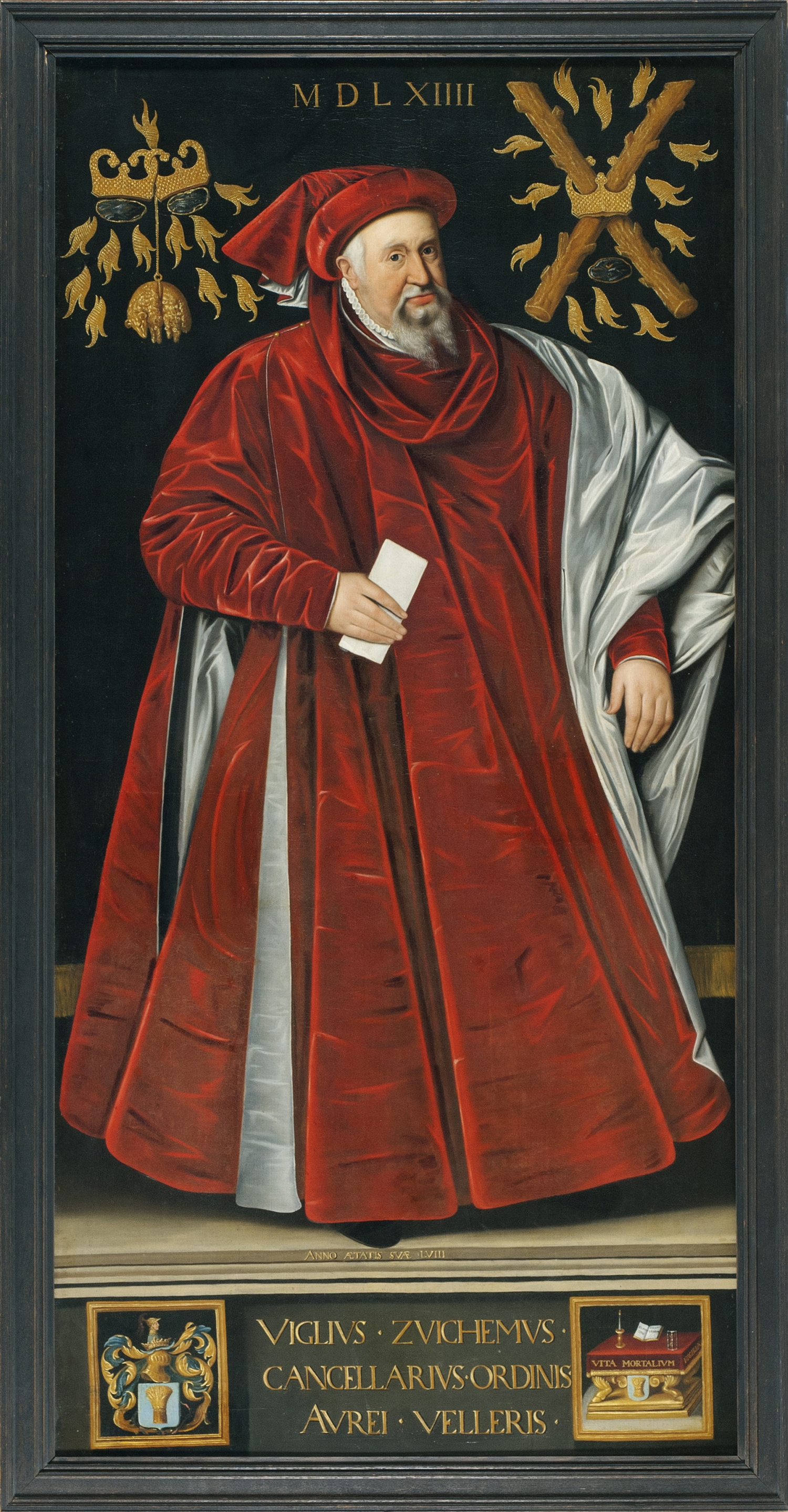
Portrait of Viglius as Chancellor of the Order of the Golden Fleece, by Jacob de Punder.

In 1559, when Margaret, Duchess of Parma became regent of the Netherlands, Viglius was an important member of the small circle who assisted her in the work of government. He was president of the privy council, member, and subsequently president, of the state council, and a member of the committee of the state council called the consulta. But his desire to resign soon returned. In 1565 he was allowed to give up the presidency of the state council, but was persuaded to retain his other posts. However, he had lost favor with Margaret, who accused him to Philip of dishonesty and simony, while his orthodoxy was suspected. When the Duke of Alva arrived in the Netherlands Viglius at first assisted him; but he subsequently opposed the duke's scheme of extortion, and sought to induce Philip himself to visit the Low Countries. His health was now impaired and his work was nearly over. Having suffered a short imprisonment with the other members of the state council in 1576, he died at Brussels on the May 5, 1577, and was buried in the abbey of Saint Bavo's Cathedral.

Viglius was an advocate of peace and moderation, and as such could not expect support or sympathy from hardliners from either side of the dispute and his moderate position became untenable. He was undoubtedly avaricious, and accumulated great wealth, part of which he left to found a hospital at his native place, Swichum, and a college at the University of Louvain. He married a rich lady, Jacqueline Damant, but had no children.

== List of works ==
- Commentaria in decem titulos Institutionum juris civilis (Basel, 1534)
- Epistolae politicae et historicae ad Joach. Hopperum (Leeuwarden, 1661)
- Tagebuch des Schmalkaldischen Donaukriegs (ed. by A. von Drullel, Munich, 1877)
- Mémoires de Viglius et d'Hopper sur le commencement des troubles des Pays-Bas (ed. by A. Wauters, 1858)
- Vita et opera historica are given in the Analecta Belgica of C. P. Hoynck van Papend recht (The Hague, 1743)
