= Easternijtsjerk =

- Village
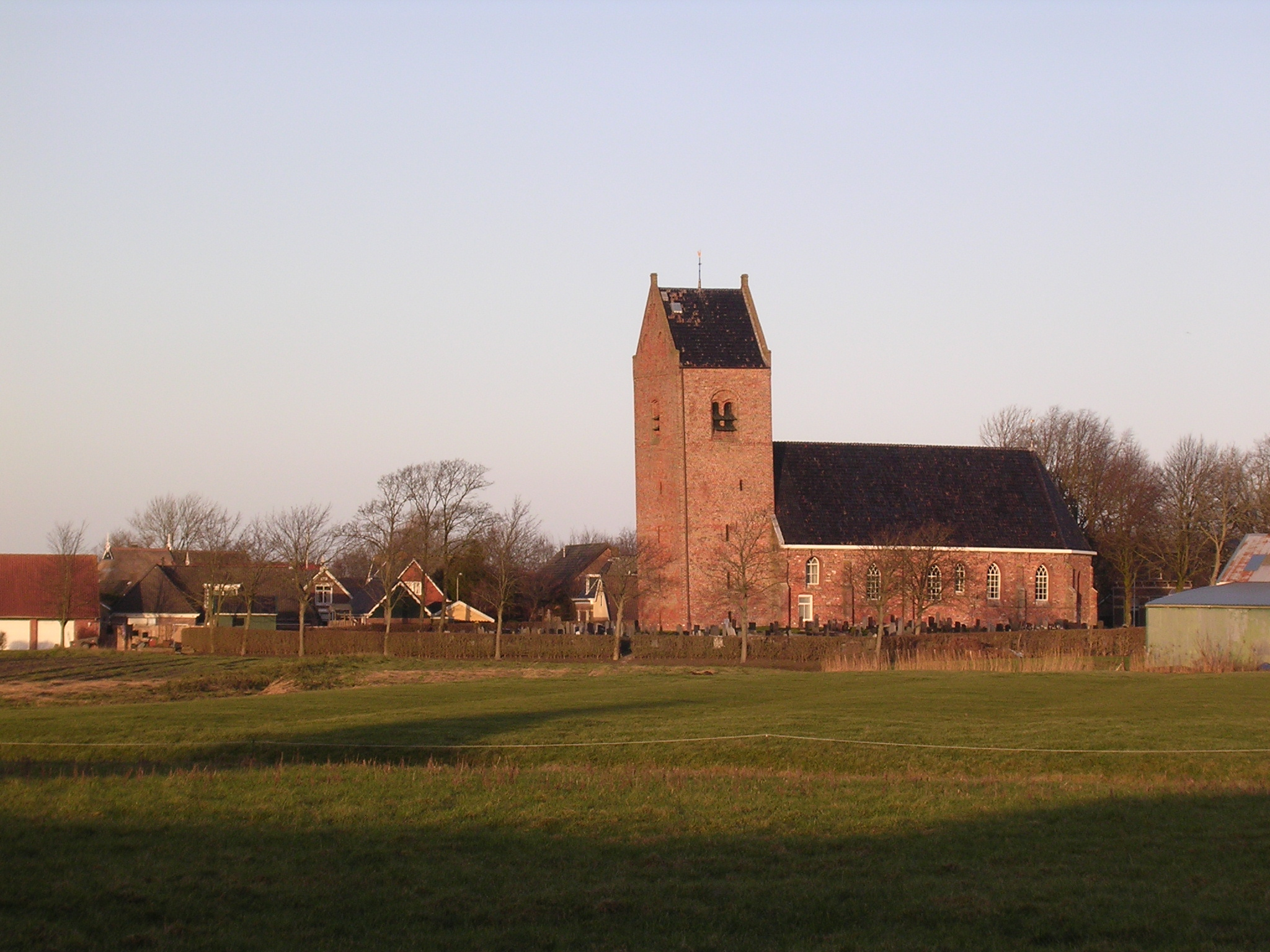
- St Cecile's church

- Flag Coat of arms

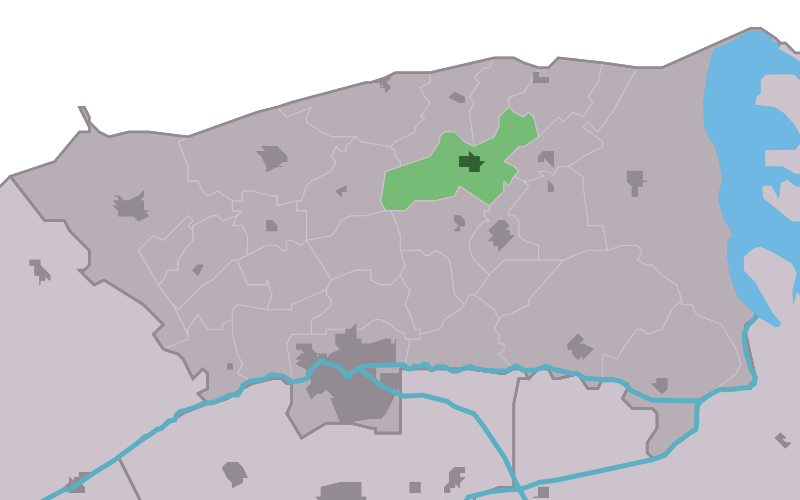
- Location in the former Dongeradeel municipality

- Location in the Netherlands Easternijtsjerk (Netherlands)
- Country: Netherlands
- Province: Friesland
- Municipality: Noardeast-Fryslân

Area
  - Total: 6.68 km^{2} (2.58 sq mi)
- Elevation: 0.5 m (1.6 ft)

Population (2021)
  - Total: 940
  - Density: 140/km^{2} (360/sq mi)
- Time zone: UTC+1 (CET)
  - Summer (DST): UTC+2 (CEST)
- Postal code: 9137
- Dialing code: 0519

Easternijtsjerk (Dutch: Oosternijkerk) is a village in Noardeast-Fryslân in the province of Friesland, Netherlands. It had a population of around 944 in January 2017. Before 2019, the village was part of the Dongeradeel municipality.

== History ==
The village was first mentioned in 1224 as Nova Ecclesia, and means the new eastern church to differentiate from Westernijtsjerk. Easternijtsjerk appeared after a dyke was built in the 11th or 12th century. The Dutch Reformed church received its current shape in the 15th century and has a 13th-century tower. In 1840, Easternijtsjerk was home to 695 people.

The village's official name was changed from Oosternijkerk to Easternijtsjerk in 2023.
