= Protestant church of Bears =

Medieval church in Beers, Friesland, Netherlands

Coordinates: 53.1557°N 5.7331°E

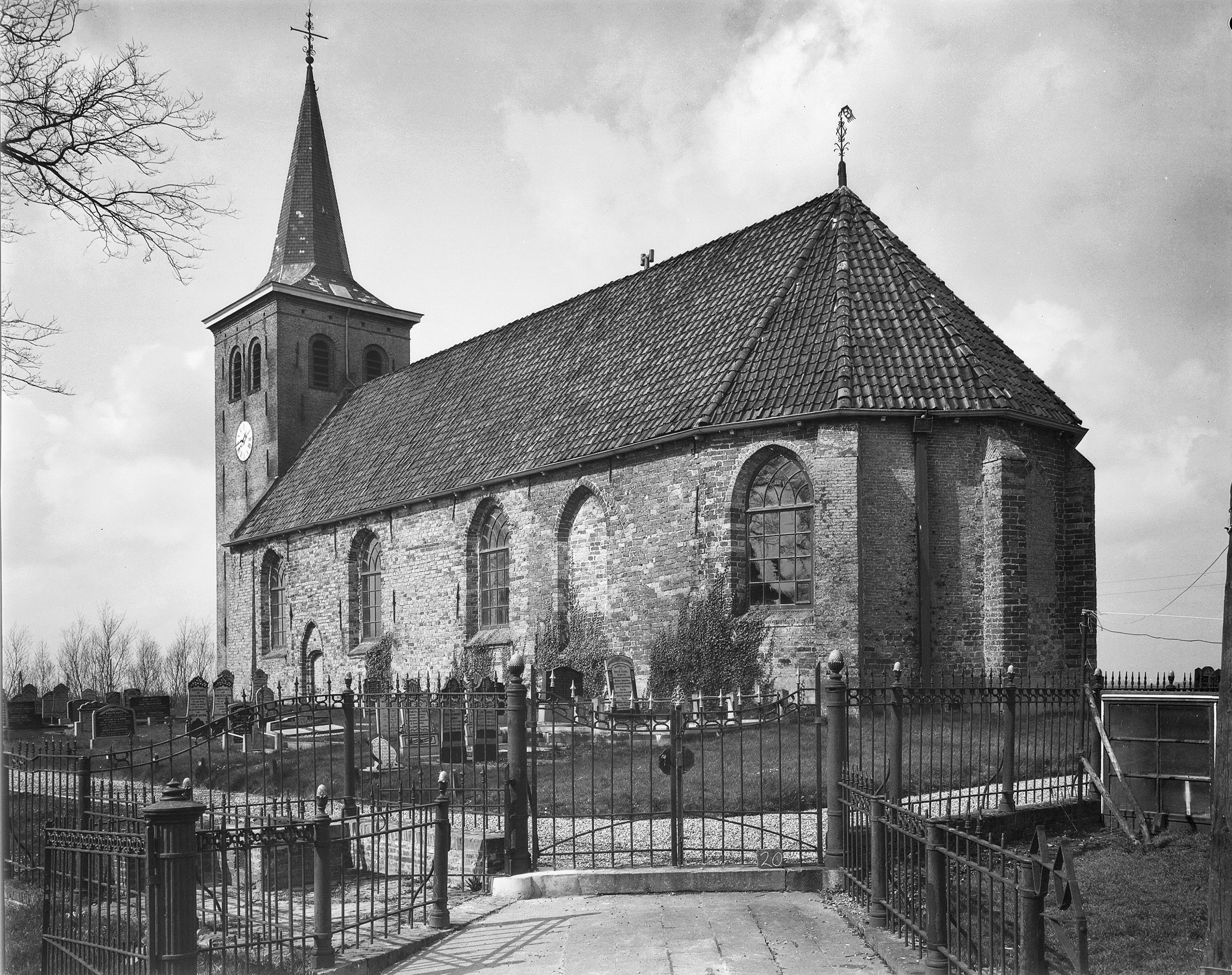
Church of Bears

The Protestant church of Bears or Saint Mary church is a religious building in Bears, Netherlands, one of the medieval churches in Friesland. The early Gothic nave was built in the 13th century and the quintuple closed choir dates from the 14th century; both are built out of yellow and red brick. In 1857, the original tower was replaced by a new one.

The church is located on the Tsjerkepaed 3 and was once a Roman Catholic church dedicated to Saint Mary but became a Protestant church after the Protestant Reformation. It is listed as a Rijksmonument, number 8470 and is in the care of Stichting Alde Fryske Tsjerken (Old Frisian Churches Foundation).
