= Protestant church of Hantumhuzen =

Church in Hantumhuzen, Netherlands

Protestant church of Hantumhuzen Saint Anne's church
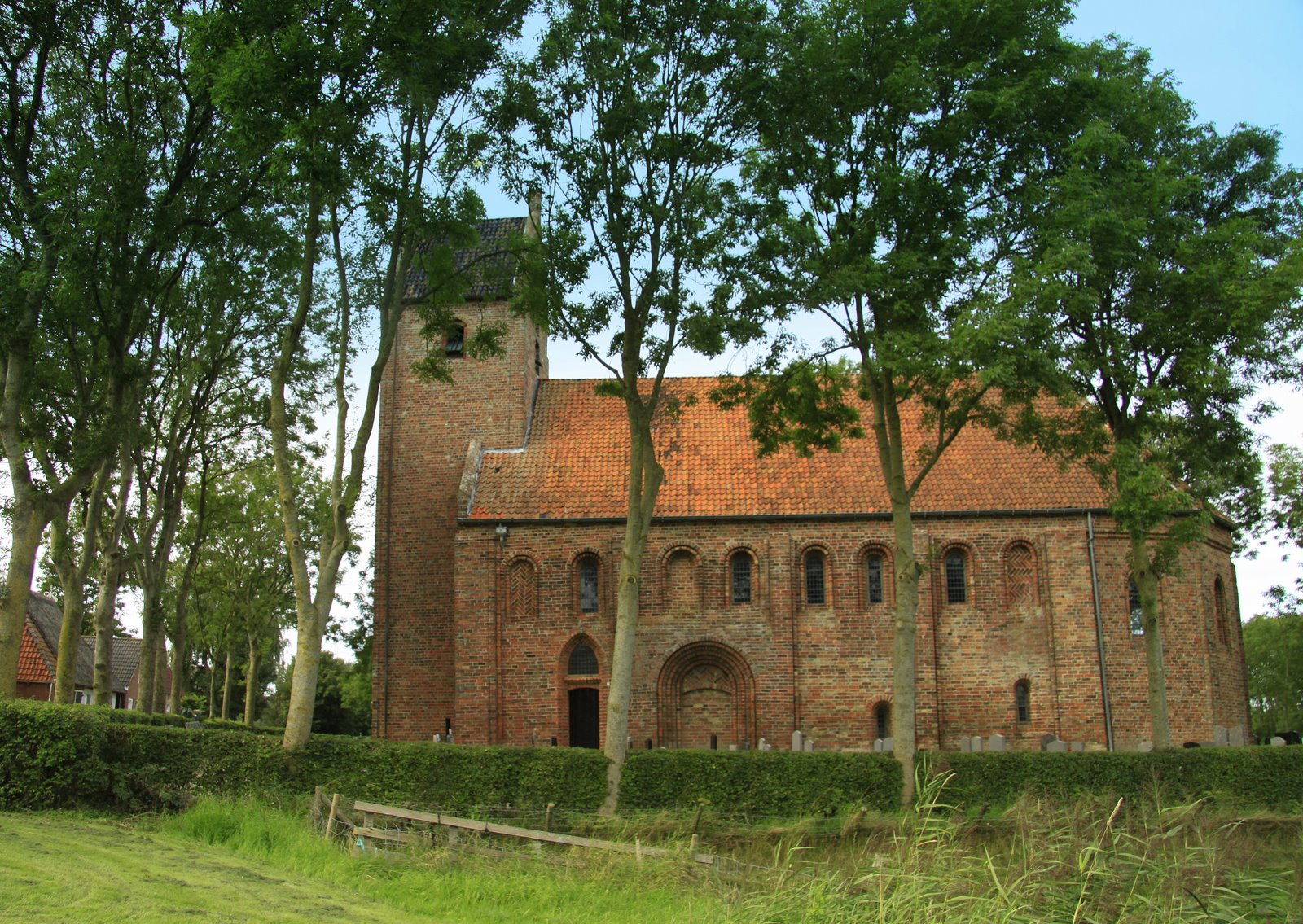
- Church of Hantumhuzen
- Protestant church of Hantumhuzen; Saint Anne's church
- 53.3725°N 5.9987°E

History
- Dedication: Before the Reformation, to Saint Anne

Specifications
- Materials: Brick

The Protestant church of Hantumhuzen or Saint Anne's church is a religious building in Hantumhuzen, Netherlands, one of the many medieval churches in Friesland.

The Romano-Gothic church was built in the first half of the 13th century out of red Brick. The tower dates from c. 1200 and the quintuple closed choir date from the 18th century.

The Pipe organ was built in 1907 by Bakker & Timmenga. The church is located on the Wierumerwei 2 and was once a Roman Catholic church dedicated to Saint Anne but became a Protestant church after the Protestant Reformation. It is listed as a Rijksmonument, number 38700 and is rated with a very high historical value and is in the care of Stichting Alde Fryske Tsjerken (Old Frisian Churches Foundation).
