= Bears, Friesland =

Beers Bears
- Village
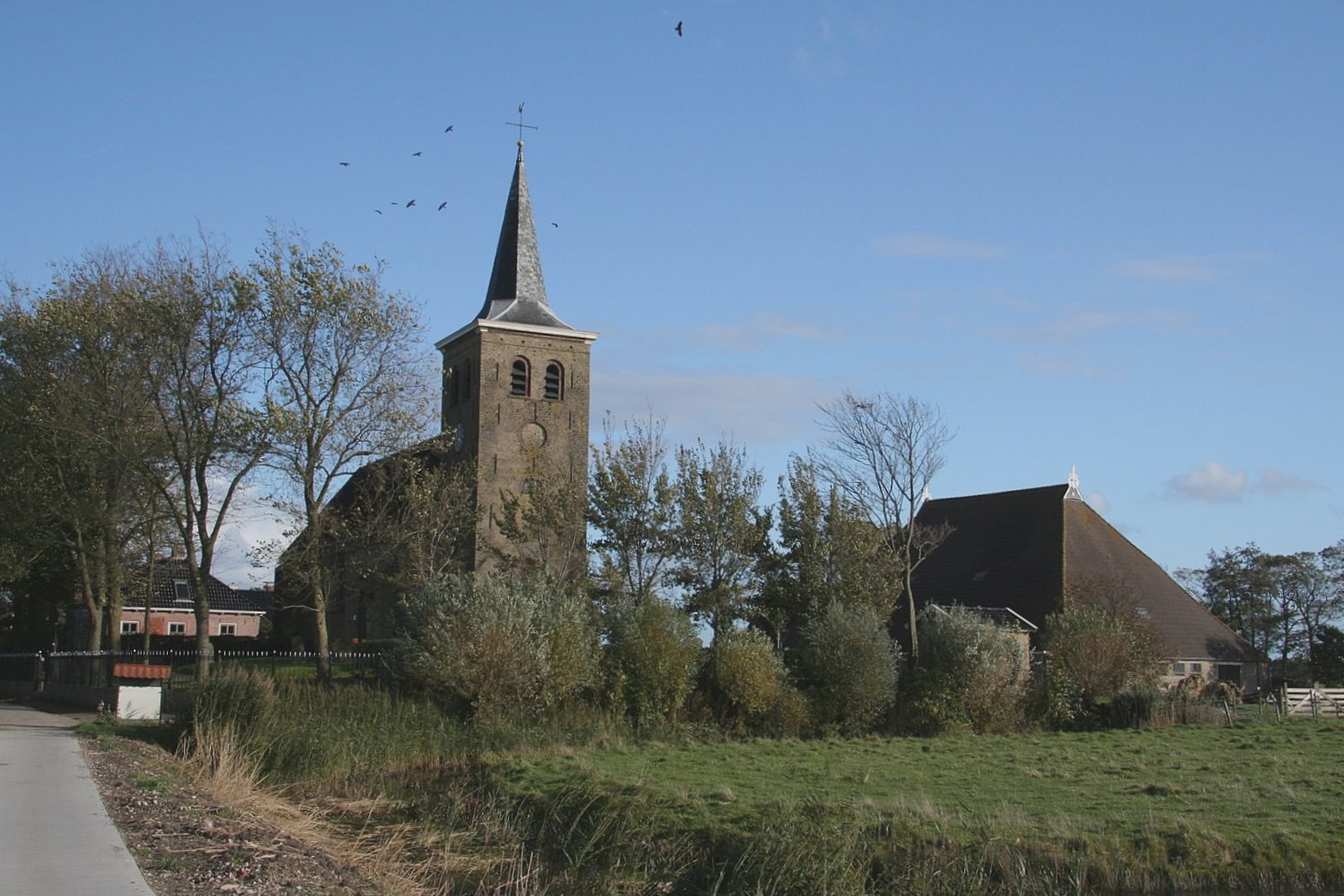
- St Mary's church

- Flag Coat of arms

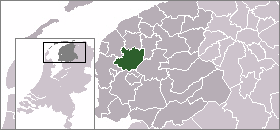

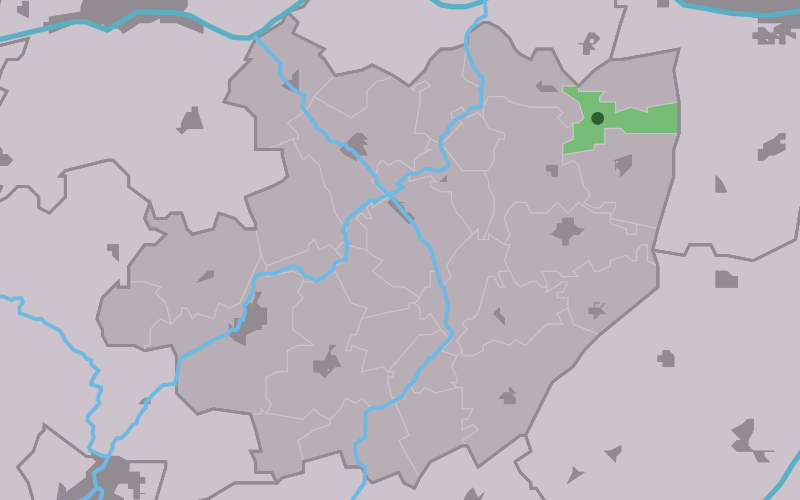
- Bears in the former municipality of Littenseradiel

- Location in the Netherlands Beers (Netherlands)
- Coordinates: 53°9′23″N 5°44′2″E
- Country: Netherlands
- Province: Friesland
- Municipality: Leeuwarden

Area
  - Total: 2.46 km^{2} (0.95 sq mi)
- Elevation: 2 m (6.6 ft)

Population (2021)
  - Total: 135
  - Density: 54.9/km^{2} (142/sq mi)
- Time zone: UTC+1 (CET)
  - Summer (DST): UTC+2 (CEST)
- Postal code: 9025
- Dialing code: 058

Bears (Dutch: Beers) is a small village in the Dutch province of Friesland. It is located in the municipality Leeuwarden, about 8 km southwest of Leeuwarden. Bears has a population of about 133 in January 2017.

The official name of the village is in Frisian ("Bears"), like all villages in Littenseradiel. "Beers" is the Dutch name.

== History ==
It was first mentioned in 1305 as Beerse, and means "fenced off hunting area". Bears is a terp (artificial living hill) village. The Protestant church of Bears dates from the 13th century. The Uniastate was a stins of the Unia family. The estate was demolished in 1756, and only the gate house has remained. A steel framed replica of the estate was built in the 1990, and has an observation tower in the middle to view the landscape.

Before 2018, the village was part of the Littenseradiel municipality.

== Notable buildings ==
- The Protestant church of Bears

== Gallery ==
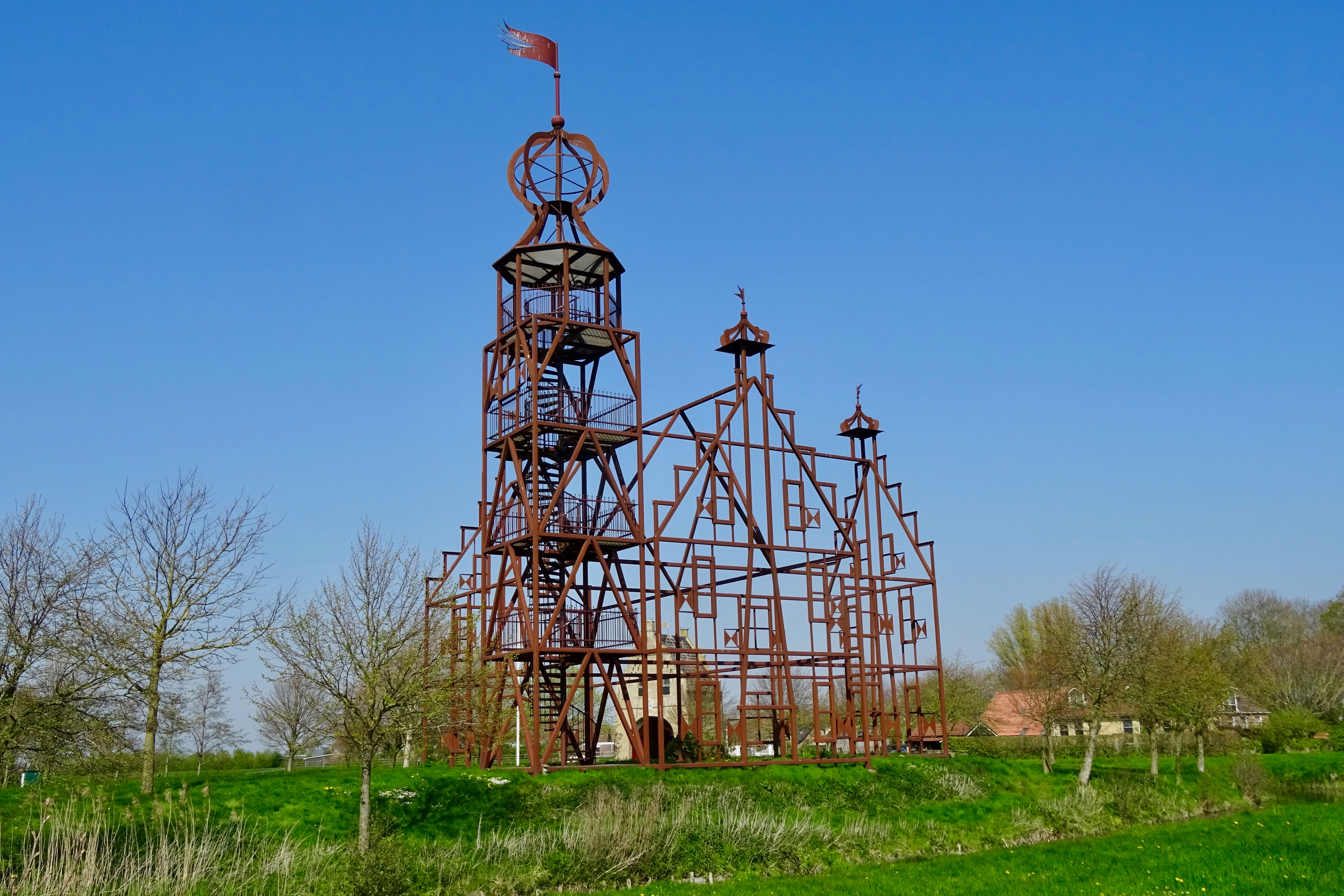
Sculpture of the former Uniastate

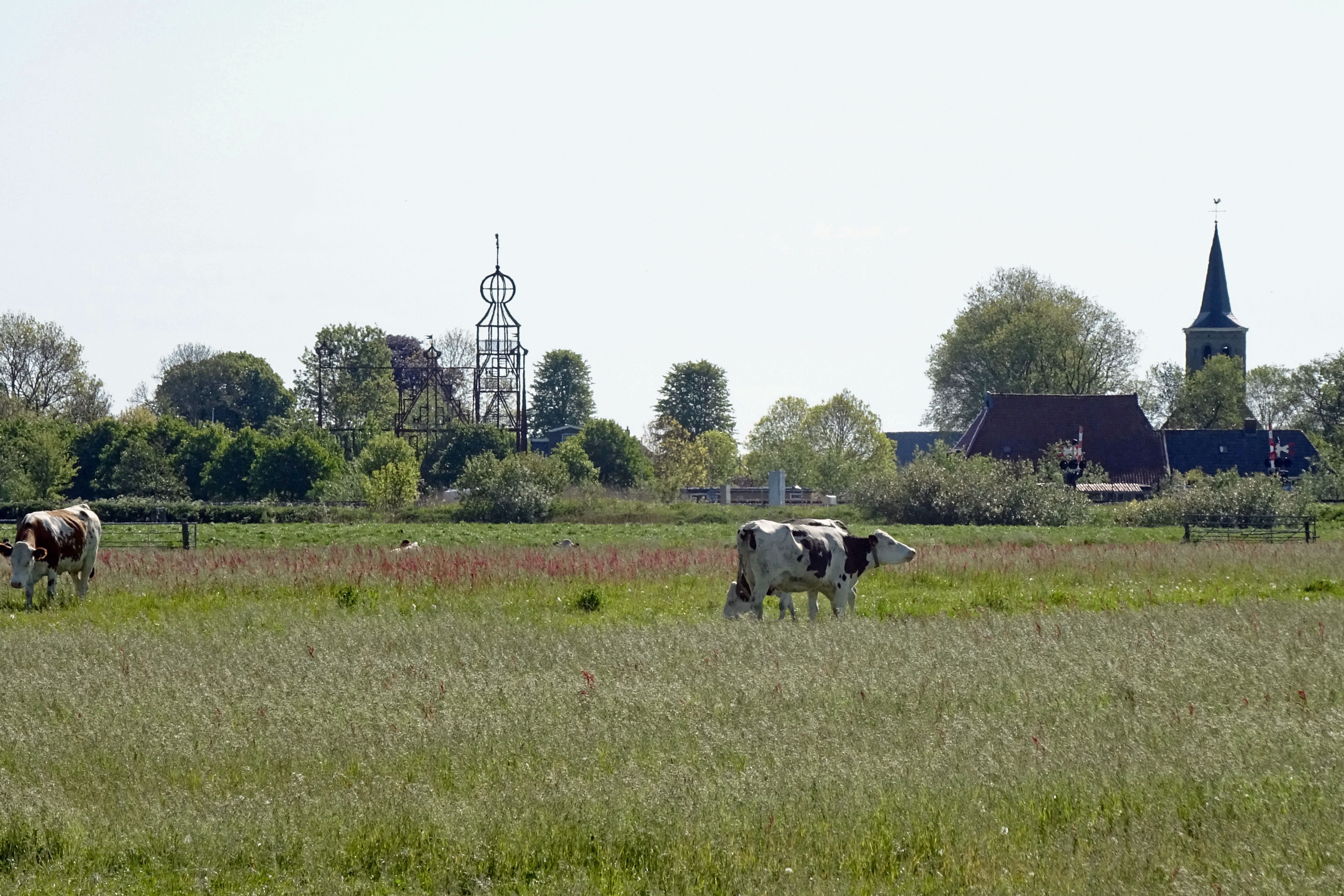
View on Bears

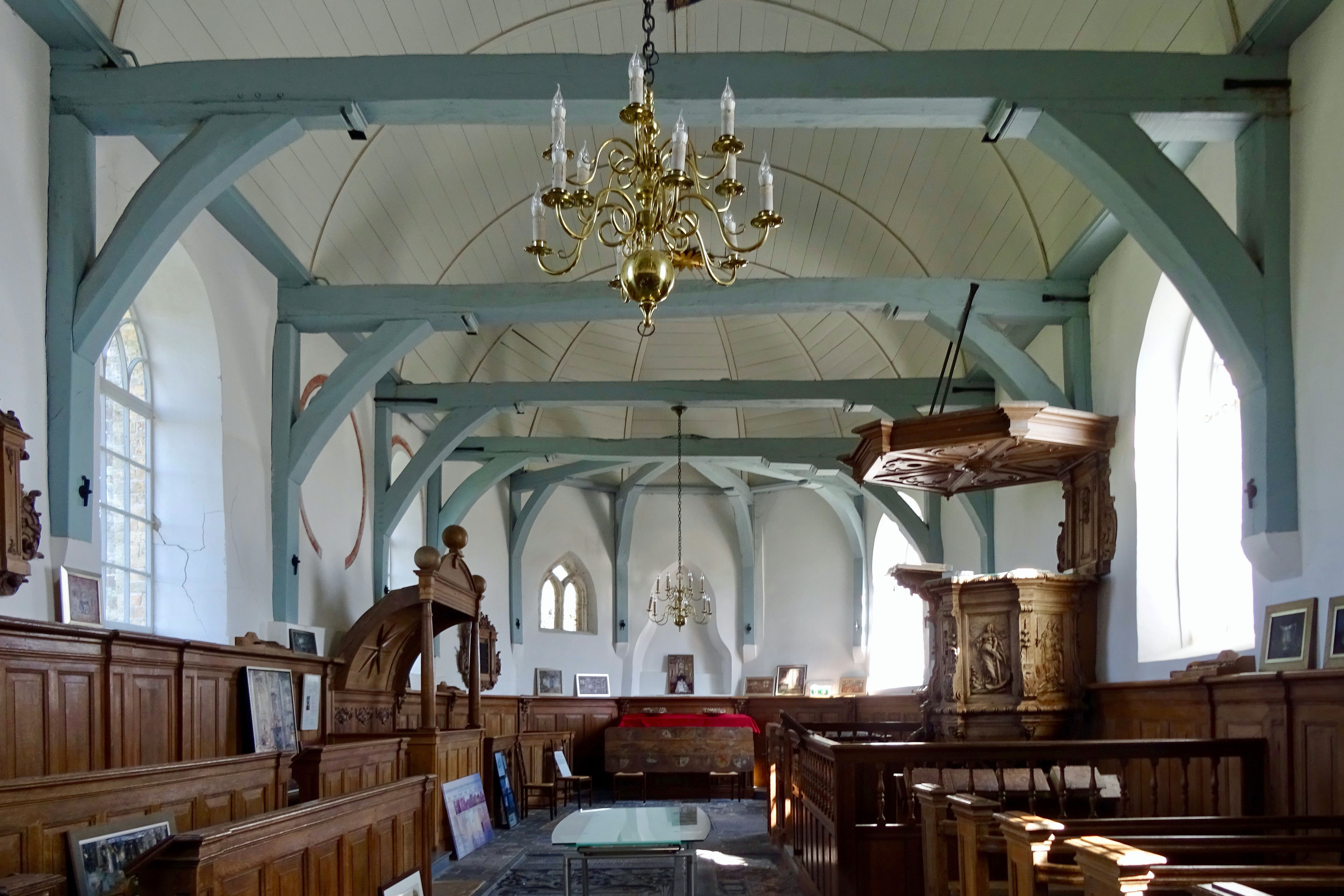
Inside the Maria Church

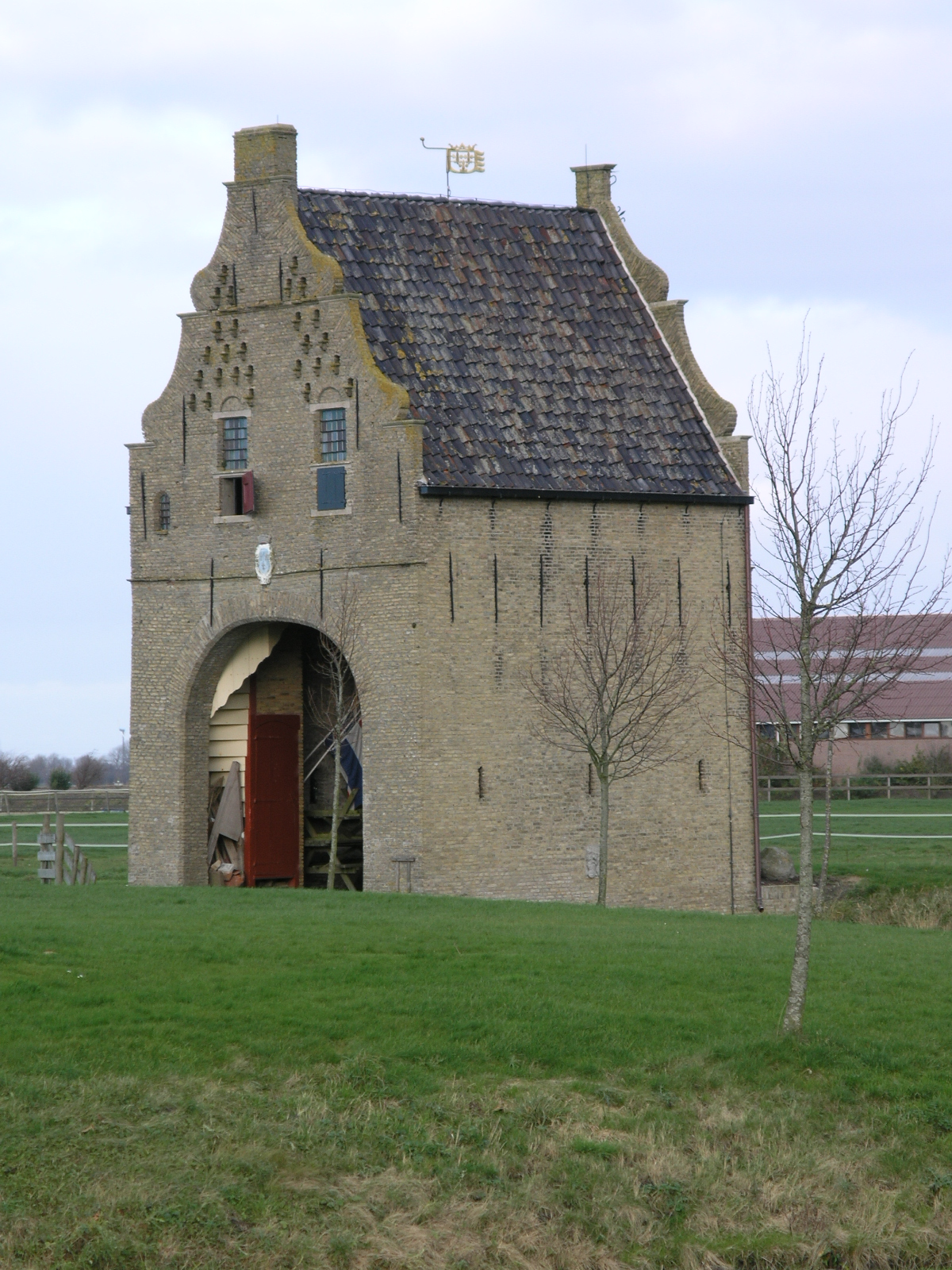
Gate house of Uniastate
