= Hantumhuzen =

- Village
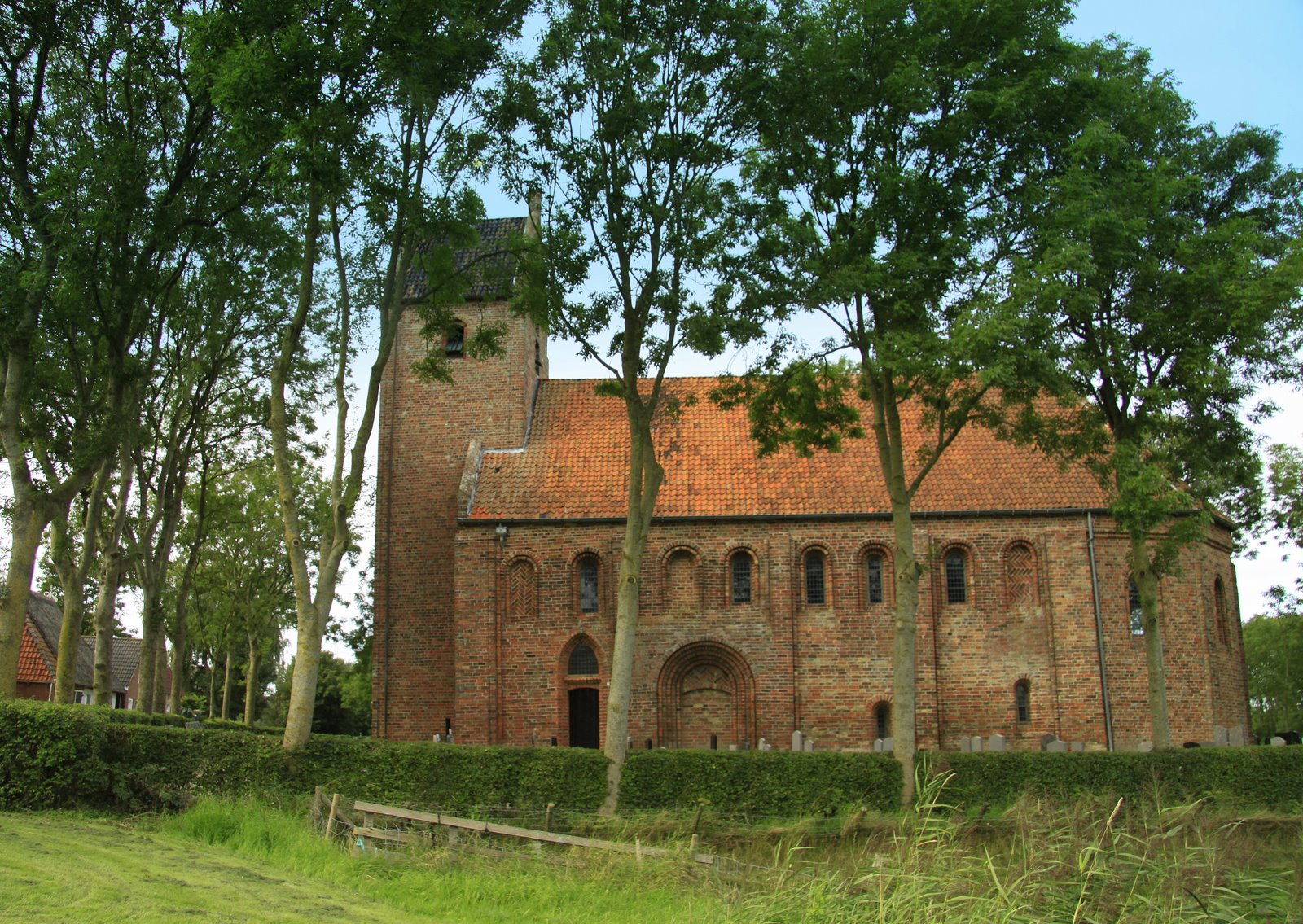
- St Ann's church

- Flag Coat of arms

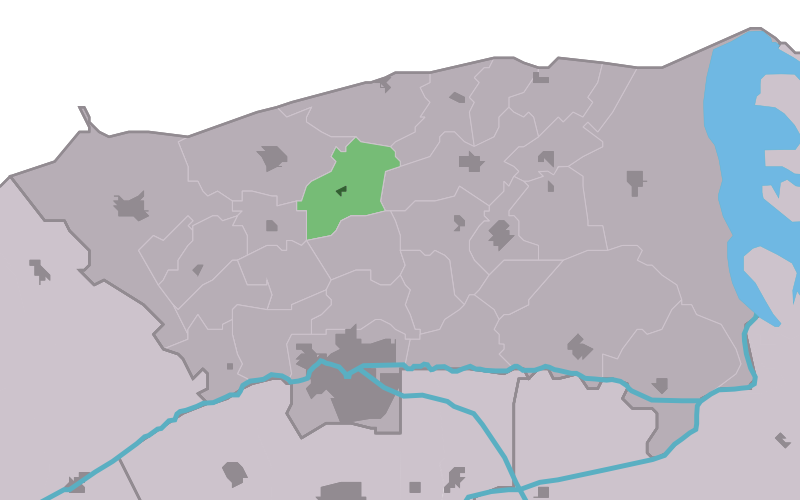
- Location in the former Dongeradeel municipality

- Location in the Netherlands Hantumhuzen (Netherlands)
- Country: Netherlands
- Province: Friesland
- Municipality: Noardeast-Fryslân

Area
  - Total: 0.18 km^{2} (0.069 sq mi)
- Elevation: 0.9 m (3.0 ft)

Population (2021)
  - Total: 105
  - Density: 580/km^{2} (1,500/sq mi)
- Time zone: UTC+1 (CET)
  - Summer (DST): UTC+2 (CEST)
- Postal code: 9144
- Dialing code: 0519

Hantumhuzen (Dutch: Hantumhuizen) is a village in Noardeast-Fryslân in the province of Friesland, the Netherlands. It had a population of around 200 in January 2017. Before 2019, the village was part of the Dongeradeel municipality.

== History ==
The village was first mentioned in the 13th century as de Hontumhusum, and means "houses near Hantum". Hantumhuzen developed during the High Middle Ages from neighbouring Hantum. It is a terp (artificial living mound) village. The tower of the Protestant church was built around 1200. The church dates from the 13th century and was enlarged in 1335. The church was restored between 1939 and 1942 in Gothic Revival style.

In 1840, Hantumhuzen was home to 269 people. In 1891, the terp was excavated.

The village's official name was changed from Hantumhuizen to Hantumhuzen in 2023.

== Notable buildings ==
- The Protestant church of Hantumhuzen

== Gallery ==
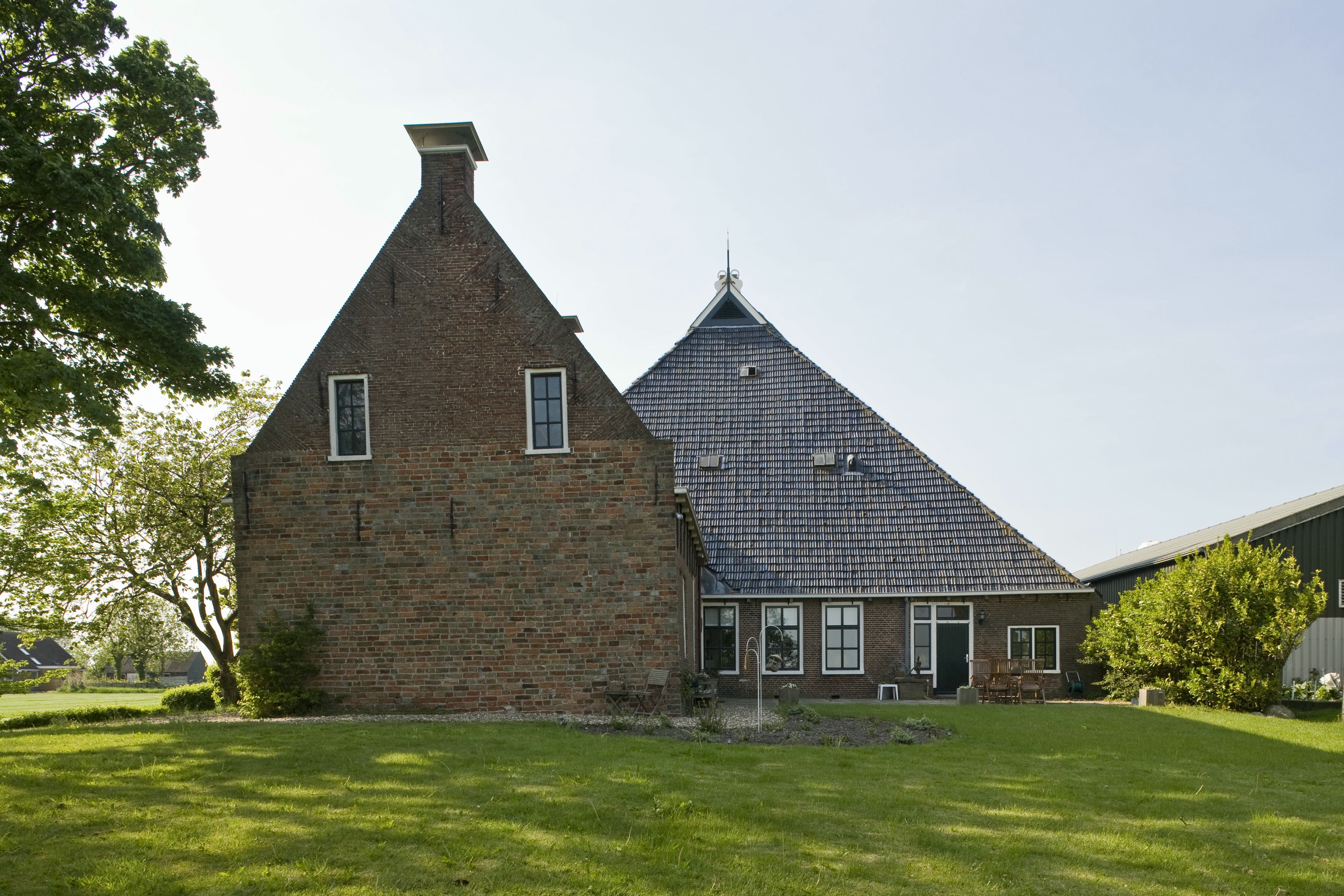
Popta State

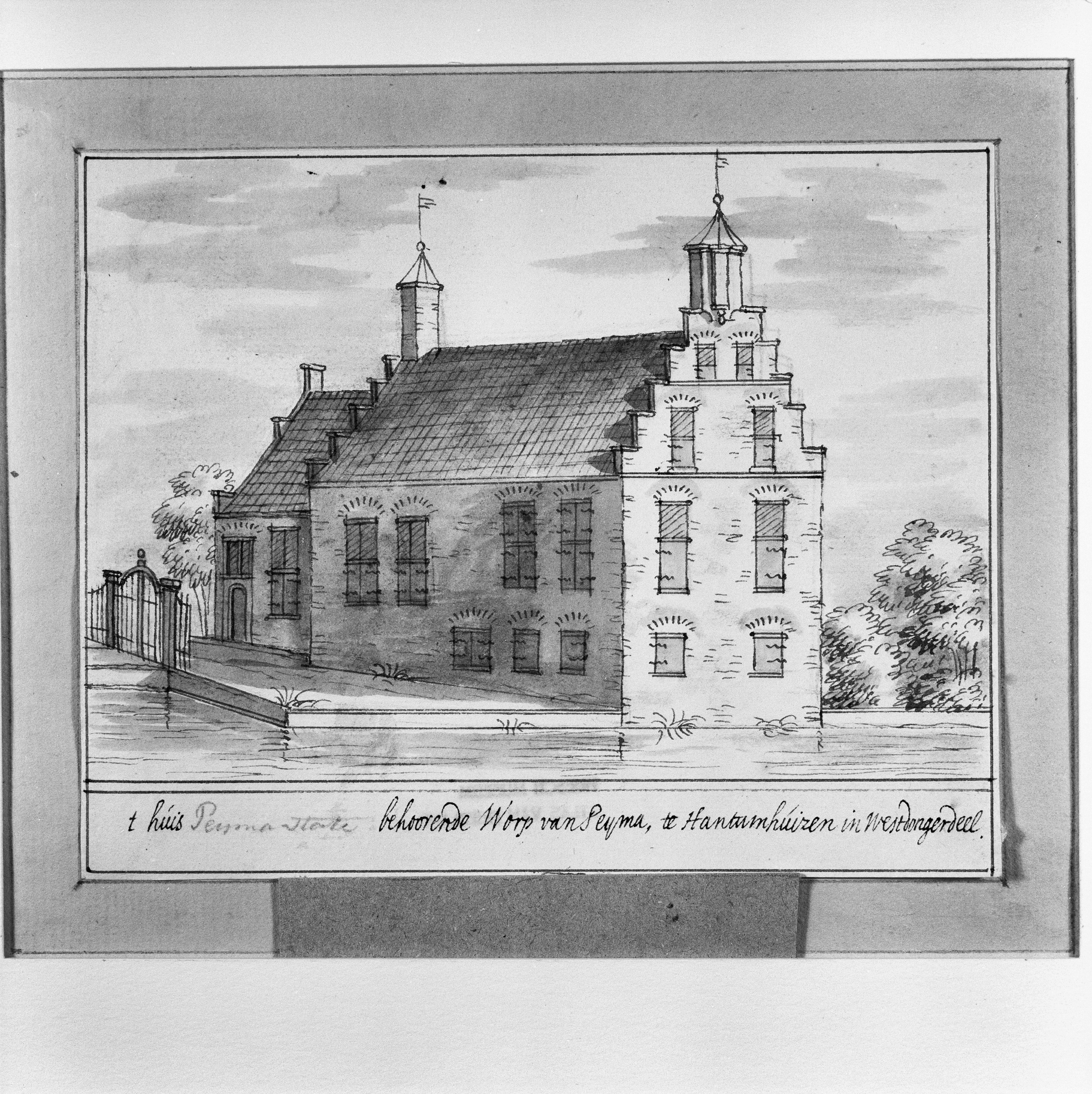
Drawing of Peyma State
