= Augsbuert-Lytsewâld =

- Village
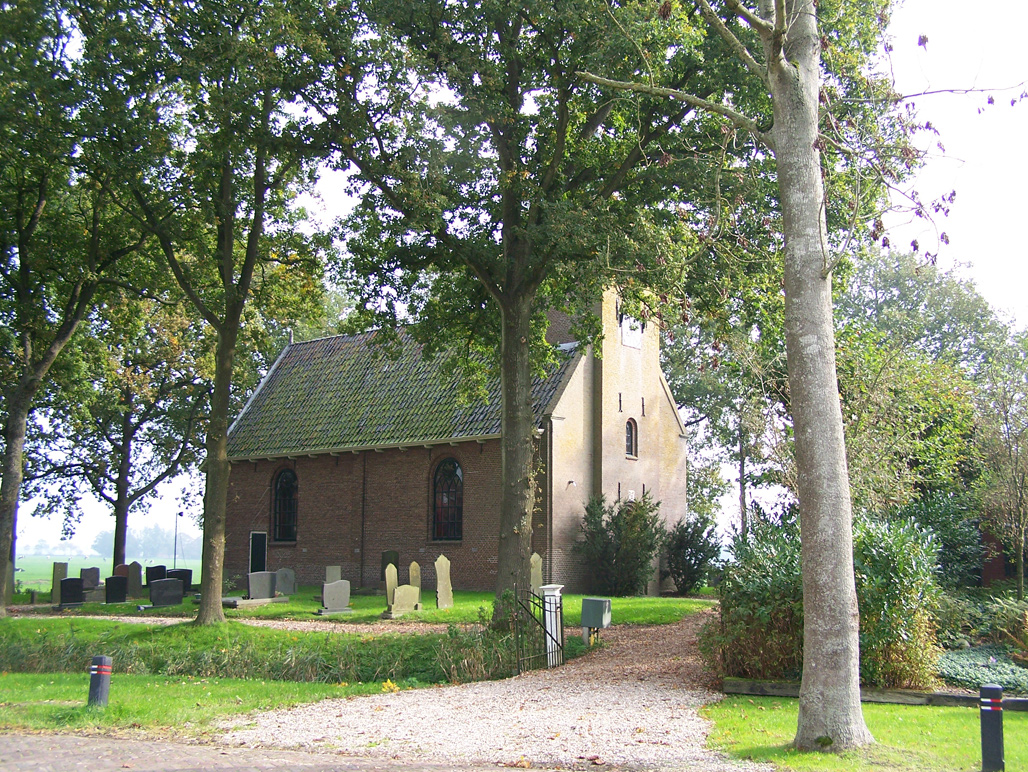
- The church of Augsbuert-Lytsewâld

- Flag Coat of arms

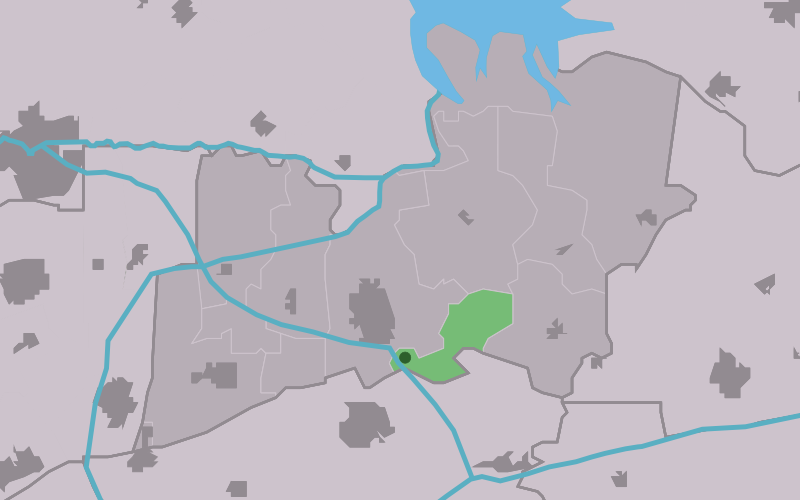
- Location in the former Kollumerland municipality

- Location in the Netherlands Augsbuert-Lytsewâld (Netherlands)
- Country: Netherlands
- Province: Friesland
- Municipality: Noardeast-Fryslân

Area
  - Total: 4.50 km^{2} (1.74 sq mi)
- Elevation: 0.6 m (2.0 ft)

Population (2021)
  - Total: 85 in 2,021
  - Density: 19/km^{2} (49/sq mi)
- Time zone: UTC+1 (CET)
  - Summer (DST): UTC+2 (CEST)
- Postal code: 9292
- Dialing code: 0511

Augsbuert-Lytsewâld is a small village in the Dutch province of Friesland. It is in the municipality Noardeast-Fryslân, about 1 km southeast of the town of Kollum.

Augsbuurt had about 70 inhabitants in January 2017. Augsbuurt had about 85 inhabitants in January 2021.

== History ==
It was first mentioned in the 15th century Aeltsbuur. The etymology is unclear, however Lytsewâld means "little forest". Augsbuert-Lytsewâld had a chapel as early as 1347. In 1782, the current church built. In 1975 it was restored, and was in use by a music school and brass band until 2010, and nowadays it can be rented for weddings, funerals and family gatherings.

In 1840, Augsbuert-Lytsewâld was home to 165 people.

The village's official name was changed from Augsbuurt to Augsbuert-Lytsewâld in 2023.

== Gallery ==
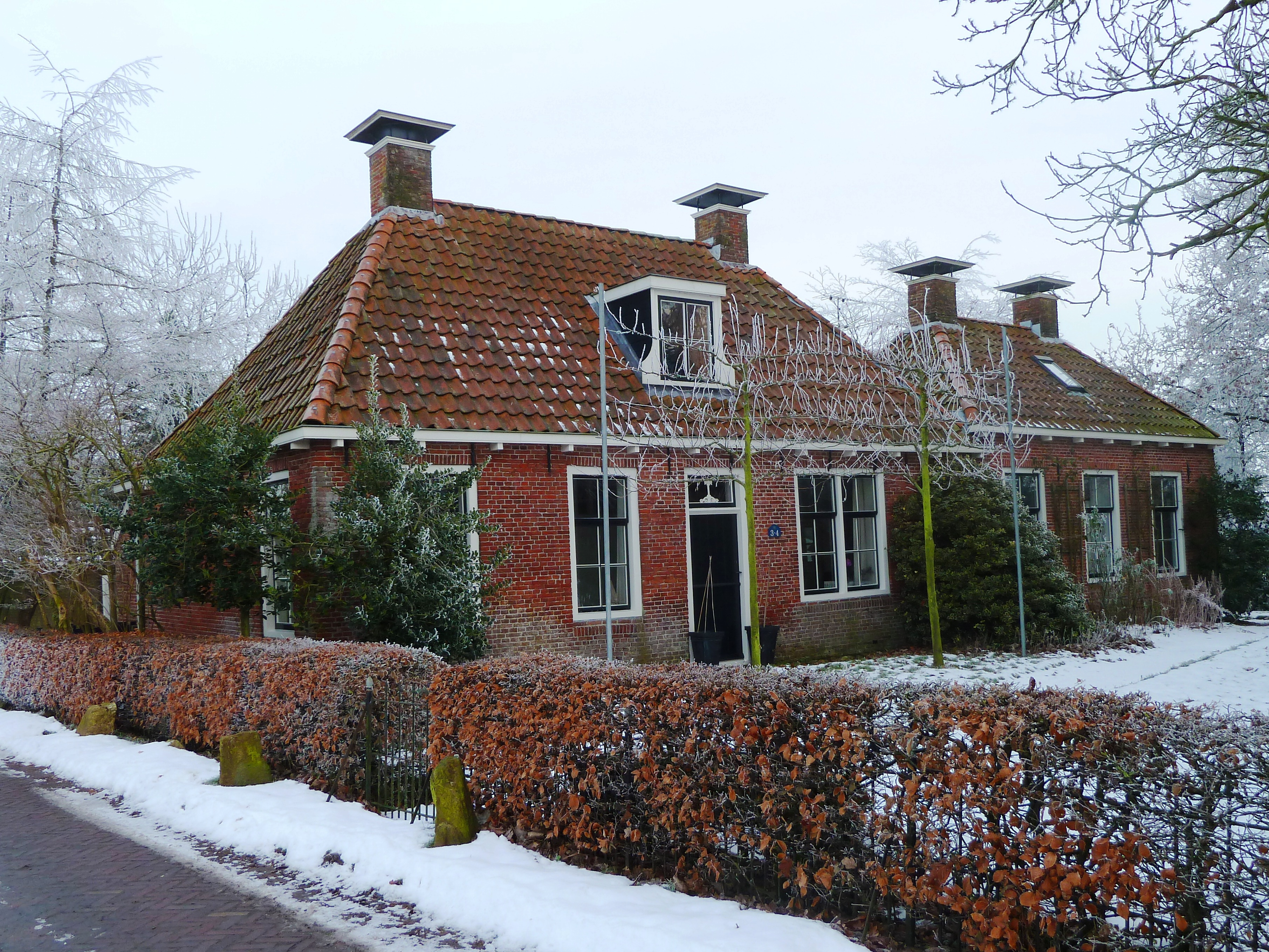
Former schoolmaster house of Augsbuert-Lytsewâld

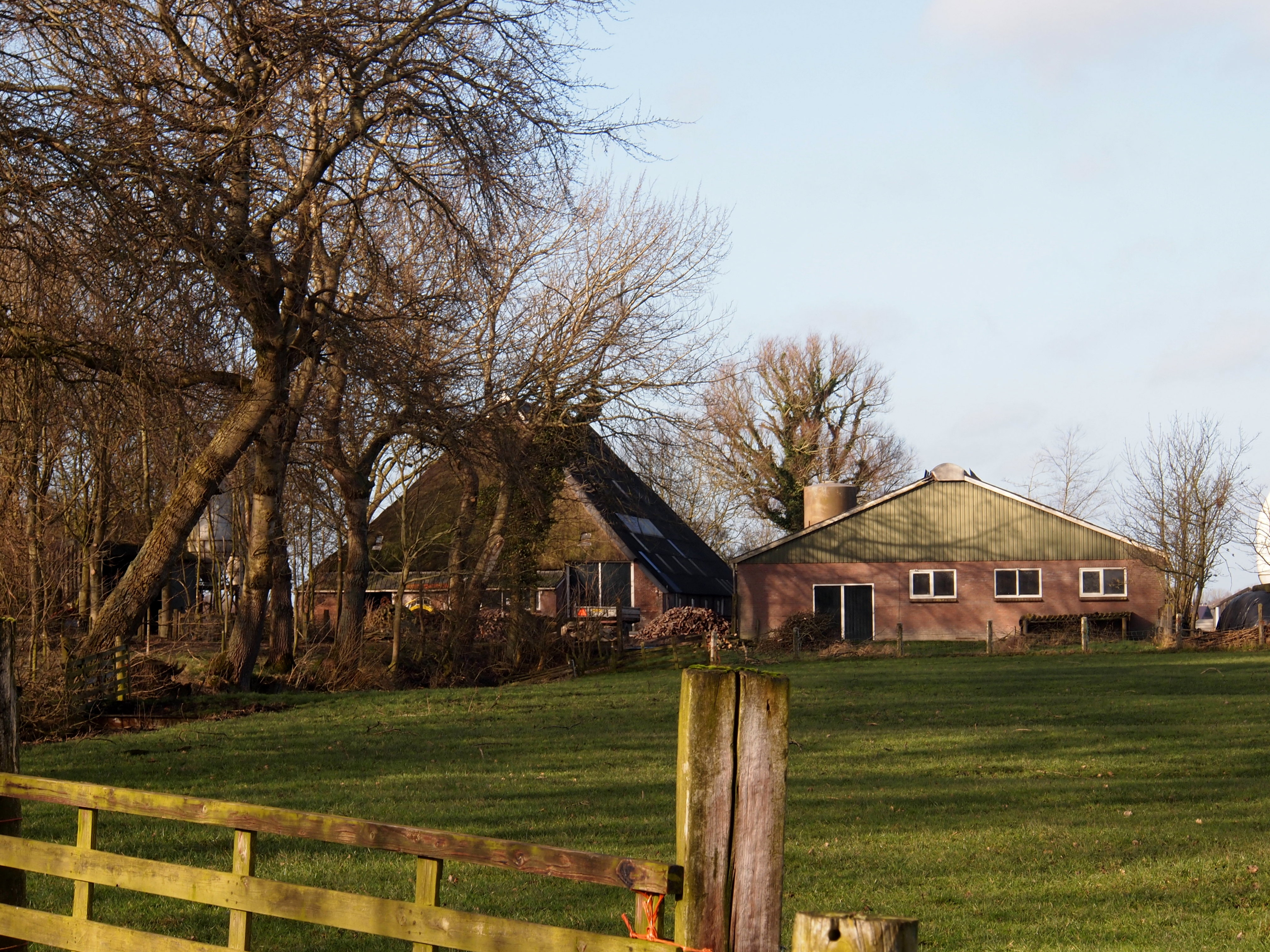
Farm in Augsbuert-Lytsewâld

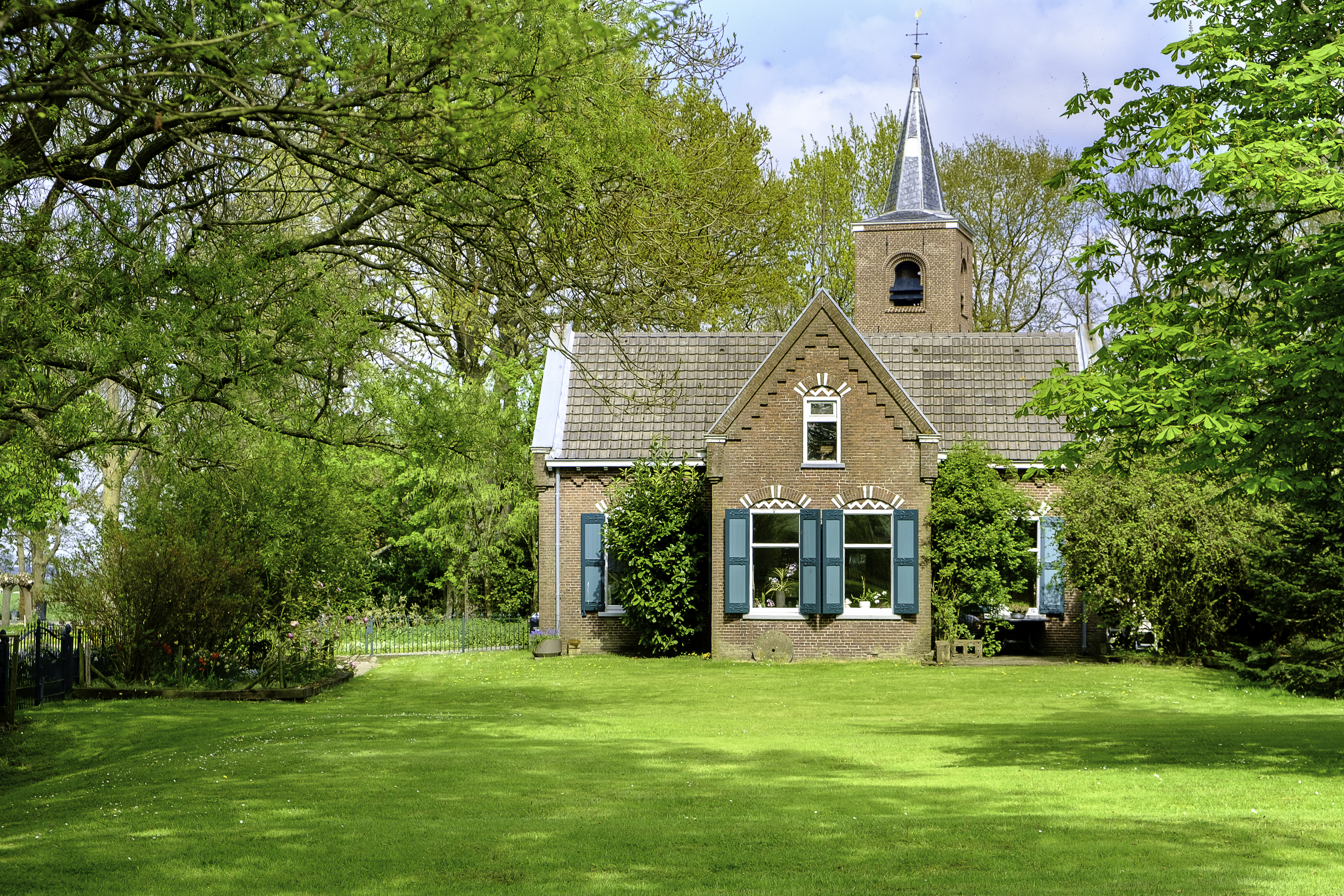
Clergy house

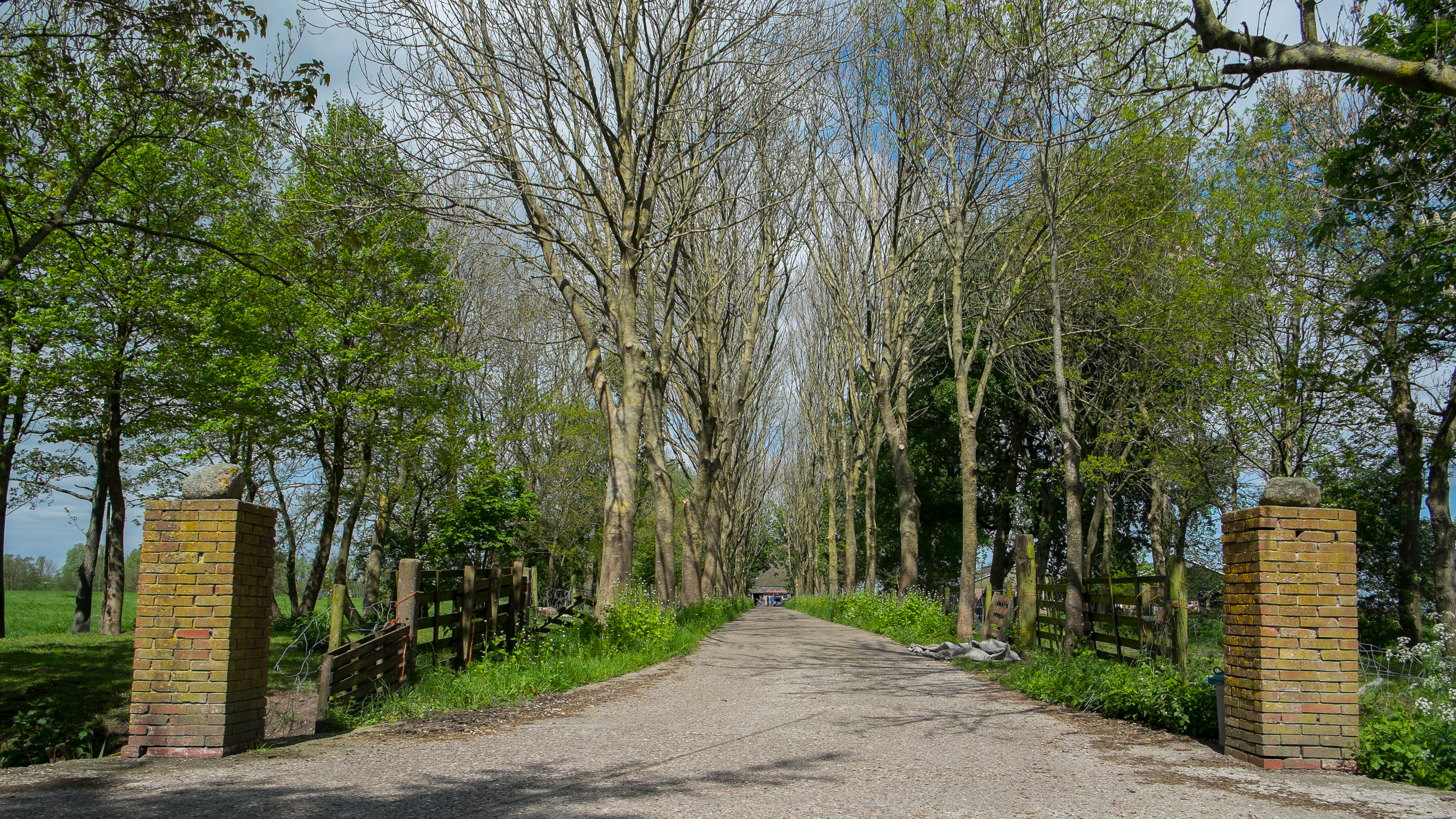
Drive way of Clantstate
