= Swichum =

- Village
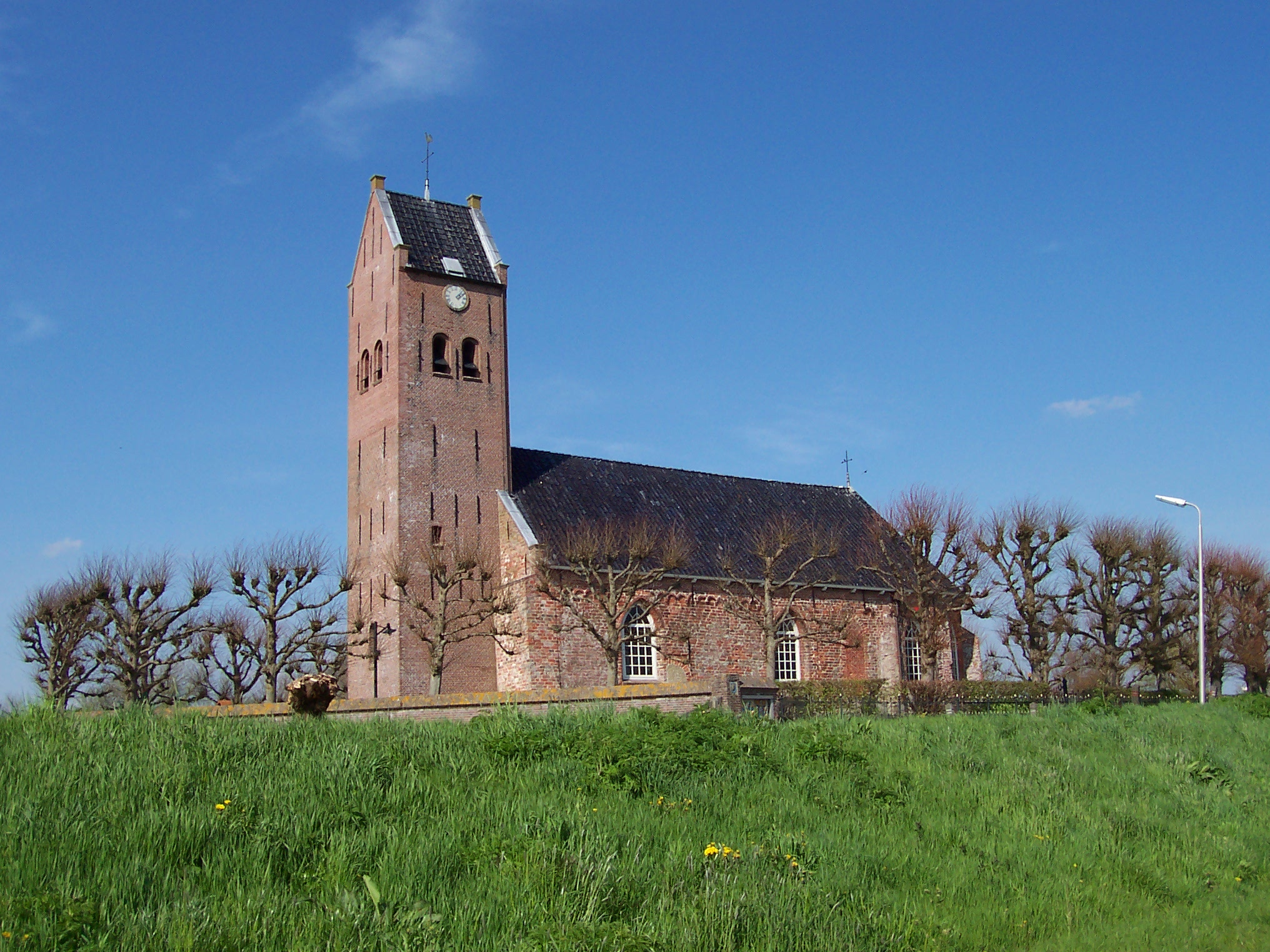
- St Nicholas' Church

- Flag Coat of arms

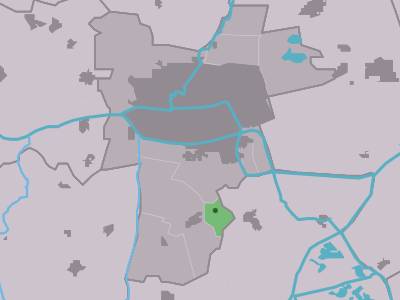
- Location in Leeuwarden municipality

- Location in the Netherlands Swichum (Netherlands)
- Country: Netherlands
- Province: Friesland
- Municipality: Leeuwarden

Area
  - Total: 1.78 km^{2} (0.69 sq mi)
- Elevation: 0.8 m (2.6 ft)

Population (2021)
  - Total: 50
  - Density: 28/km^{2} (73/sq mi)
- Time zone: UTC+1 (CET)
  - Summer (DST): UTC+2 (CEST)
- Postal code: 9087
- Dialing code: 058

Swichum is a village in Leeuwarden municipality in the province of Friesland, the Netherlands. It had a population of around 50 in January 2017.

== History ==
The village was first mentioned in the 14th century as Swygghem. The etymology is unclear. Swichum is located on a natural mound. During the 10th century, a dike was built linking the village to Goutum and Leeuwarden.

The Barrahuis was a stins which was built before 1481. The estate was the scene of several battles between the Vetkopers and Schieringers. In 1507, Wigle van Aytta was born in the Barrahuis. In 1515, the Barrahuis was destroyed, however George, Duke of Saxony awarded the van Ayttas the estate Montzimahuis in Leeuwarden. The front of the farm at the location is a remainder of the former estate.

In 1840, Swichum was home to 104 people. Before 1944, Swichum was part of Leeuwarderadeel municipality.

== Notable buildings ==
- The Protestant church of Swichum

== Notable people ==
- Wigle van Aytta better known as Viglius (1507–1577), statesman and jurist.

== Gallery ==
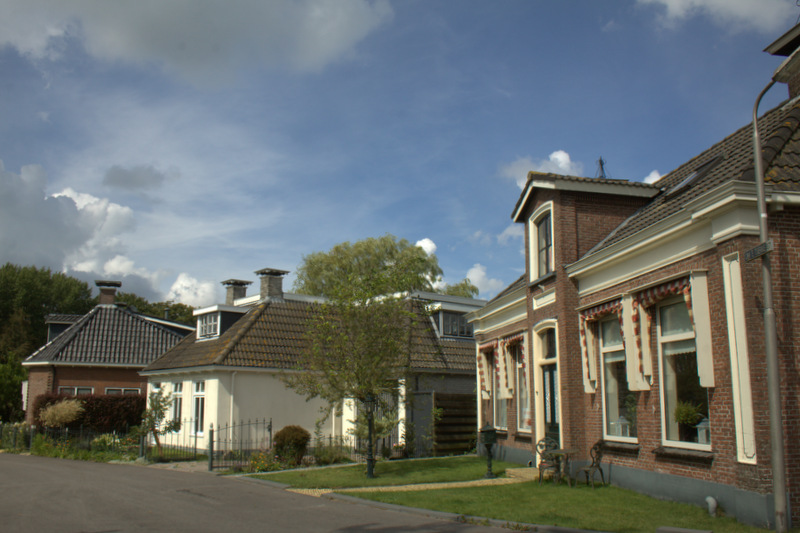
Houses in Swichum

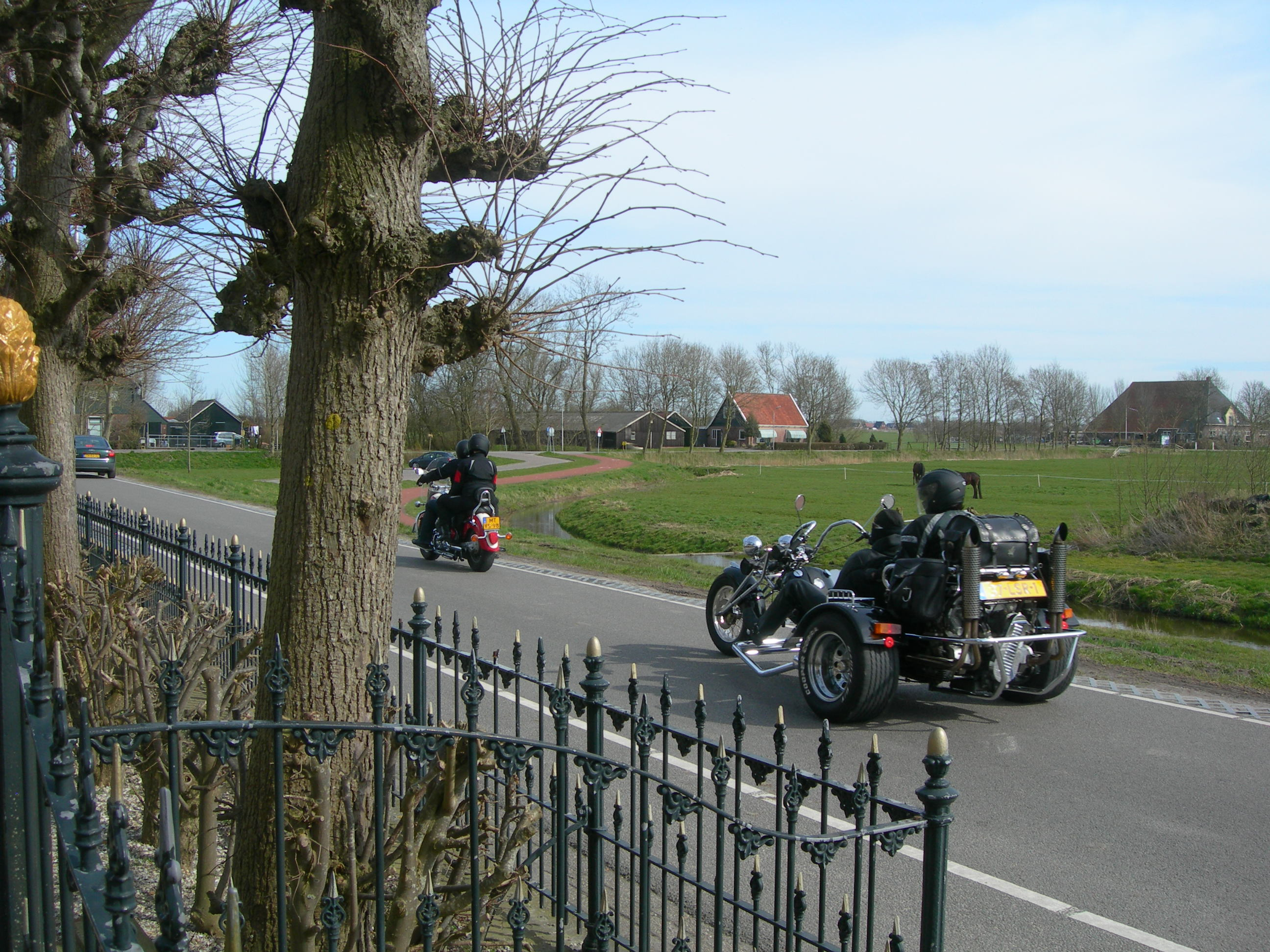
Street view

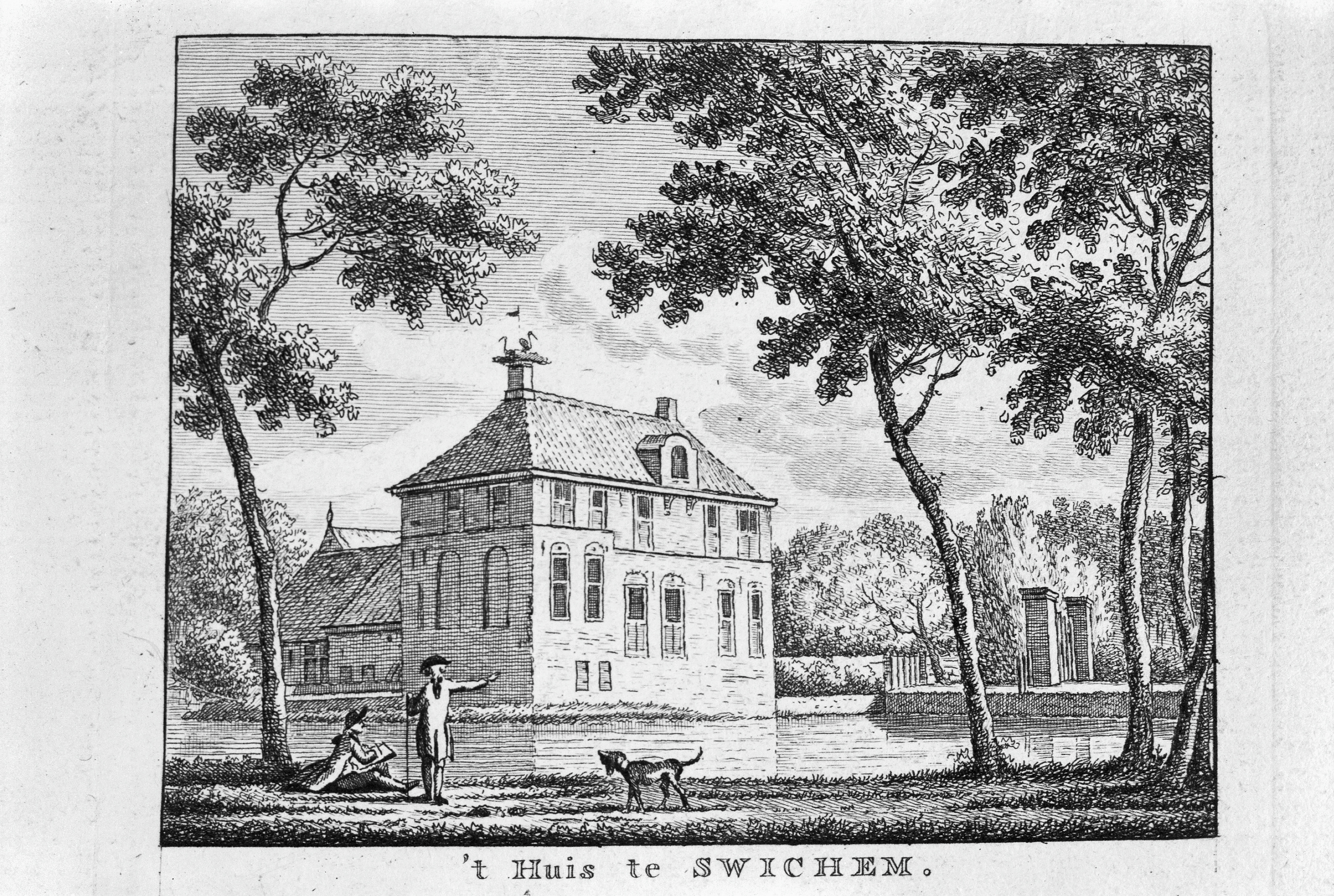
Huis Swichum

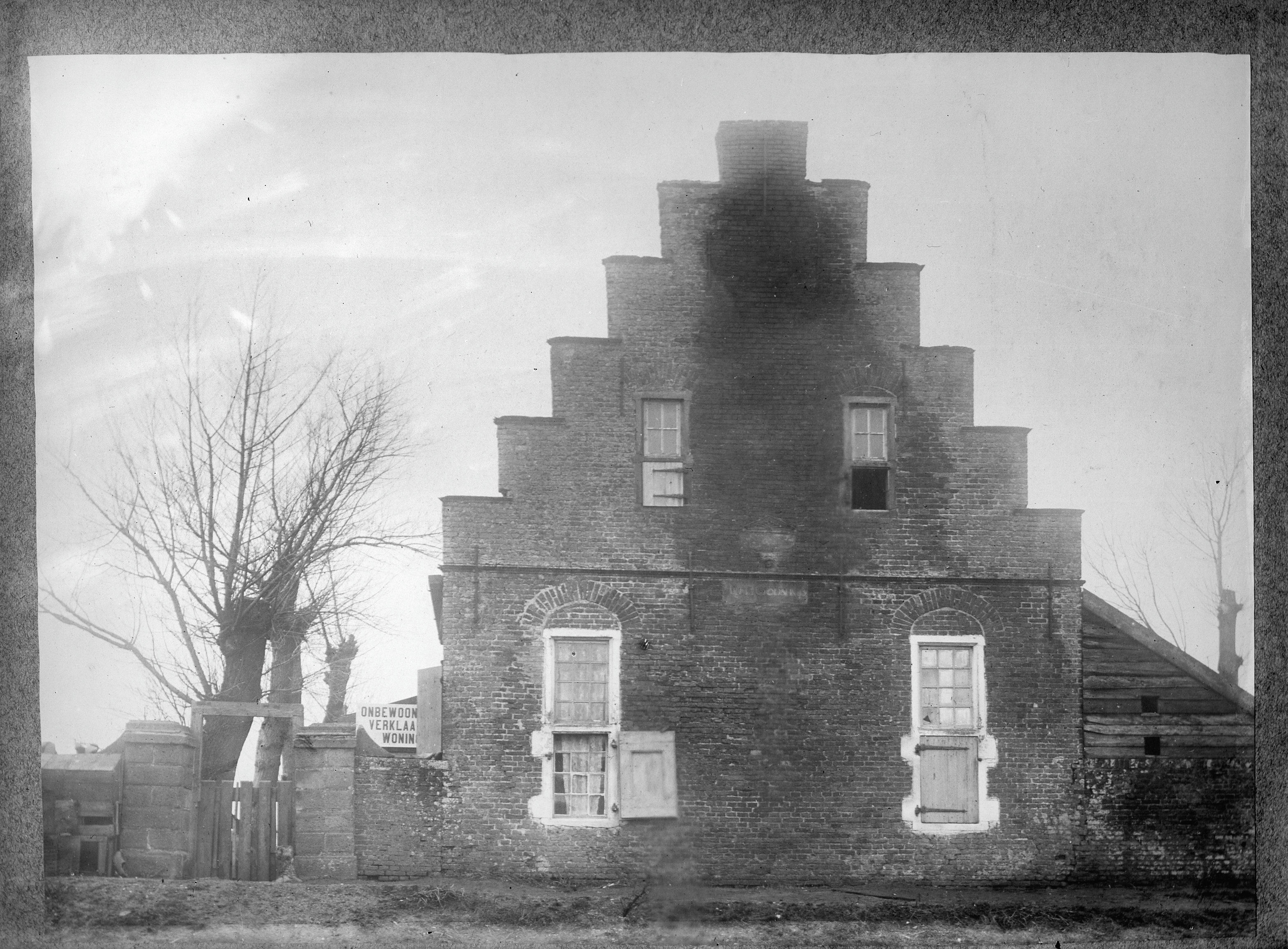
Farm (1909)
