= Westernijtsjerk =

Westernijkerk Westernijtsjerk
- Hamlet
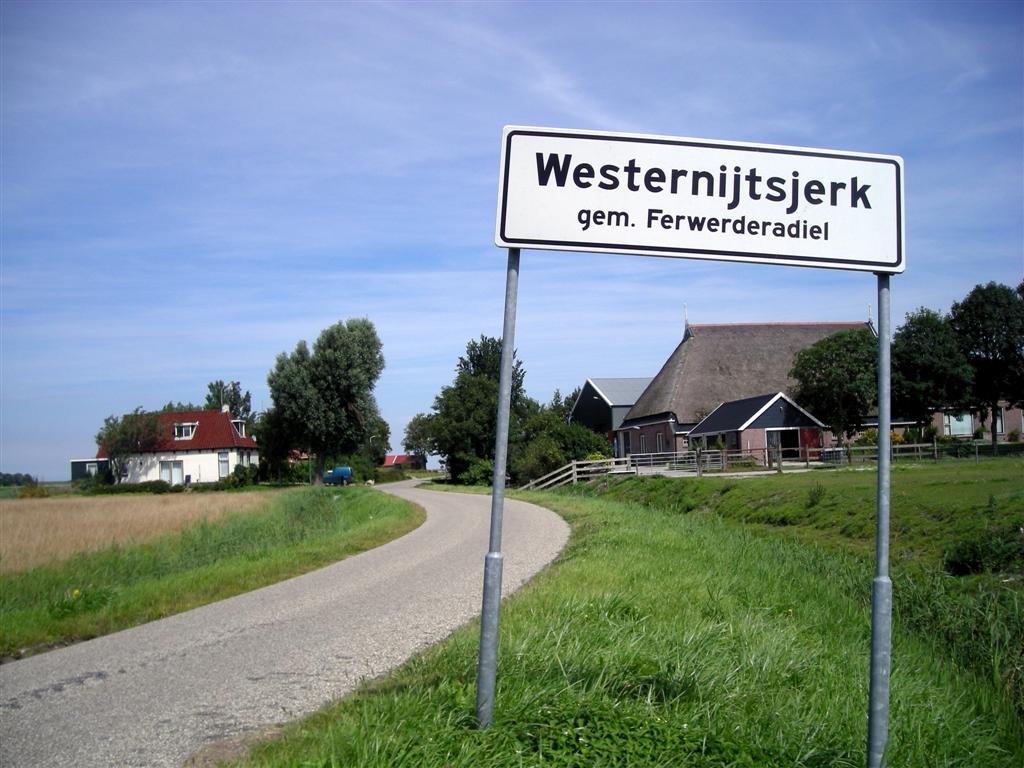
- Westernijtsjerk

- Flag Seal

- Location in the Netherlands Westernijkerk (Netherlands)
- Country: Netherlands
- Province: Friesland
- Municipality: Noardeast-Fryslân

Area
  - Total: 11.51 km^{2} (4.44 sq mi)
- Elevation: 1.0 m (3.3 ft)

Population (2021)
  - Total: 215
  - Density: 18.7/km^{2} (48.4/sq mi)
- Time zone: UTC+1 (CET)
  - Summer (DST): UTC+2 (CEST)
- Postal code: 9073
- Dialing code: 0519

Westernijtsjerk (Dutch: Westernijkerk) is a hamlet in Noardeast-Fryslân municipality in the province of Friesland, the Netherlands. Before 2019, the village was part of the Ferwerderadiel municipality.

The village was first mentioned in 1224 as Nova Ecclesia, and means "western new church". It uses West to distinguish from Oosternijkerk. Westernijtsjerk is a linear settlement along the road directly to the west Marrum, however both are separated by the N357 road. The Dutch reformed church dates from the 13th century and has a 15th-century tower. In 1840, it was home to 228 people. Nowadays, it consists of about 60 houses. Between 1901 and 1940, there was a joint railway station with Marrum. There is a pancake house in an old railroad car attached to a steam train.

== Gallery ==
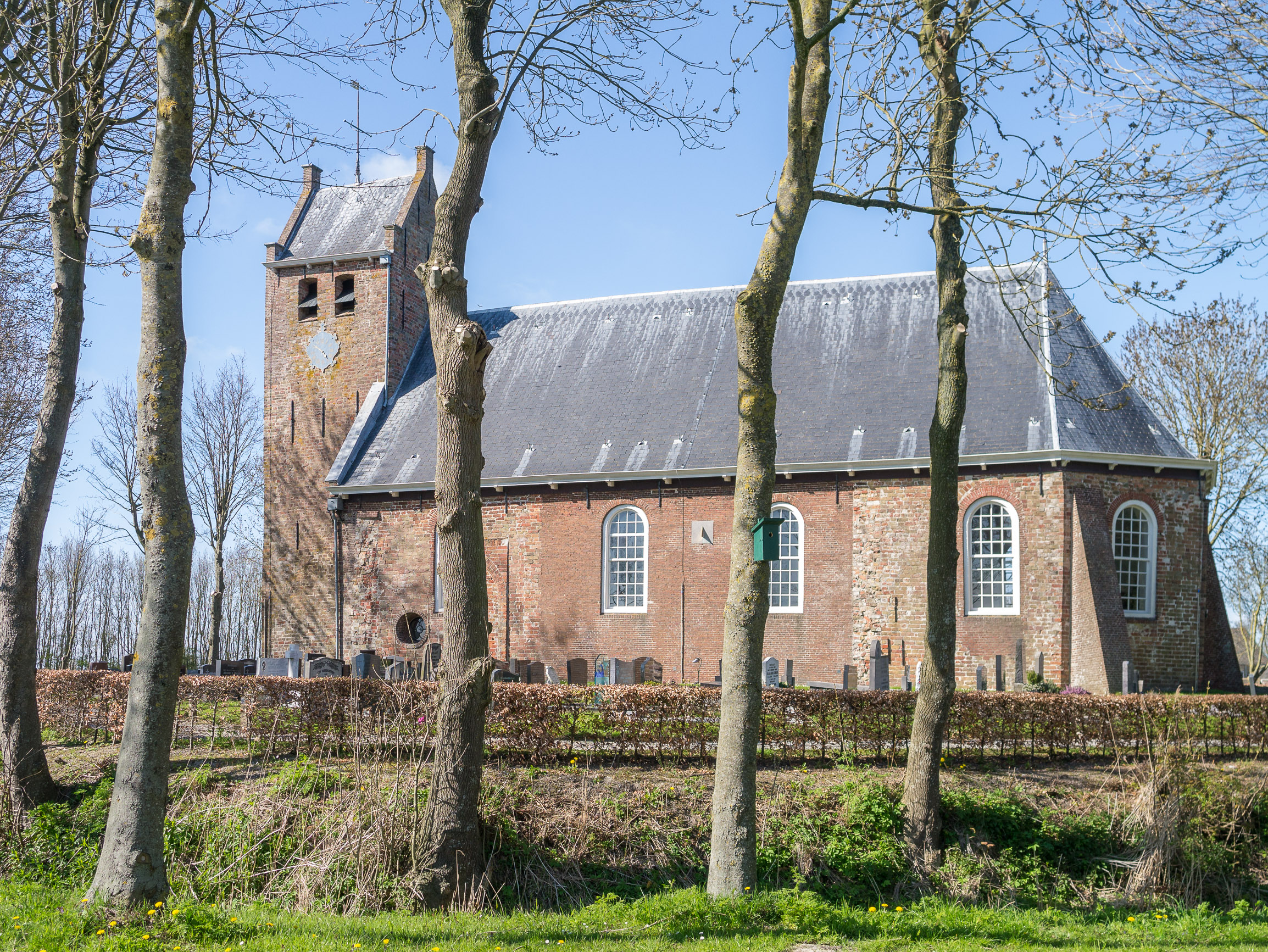
Church, Westernijtsjerk

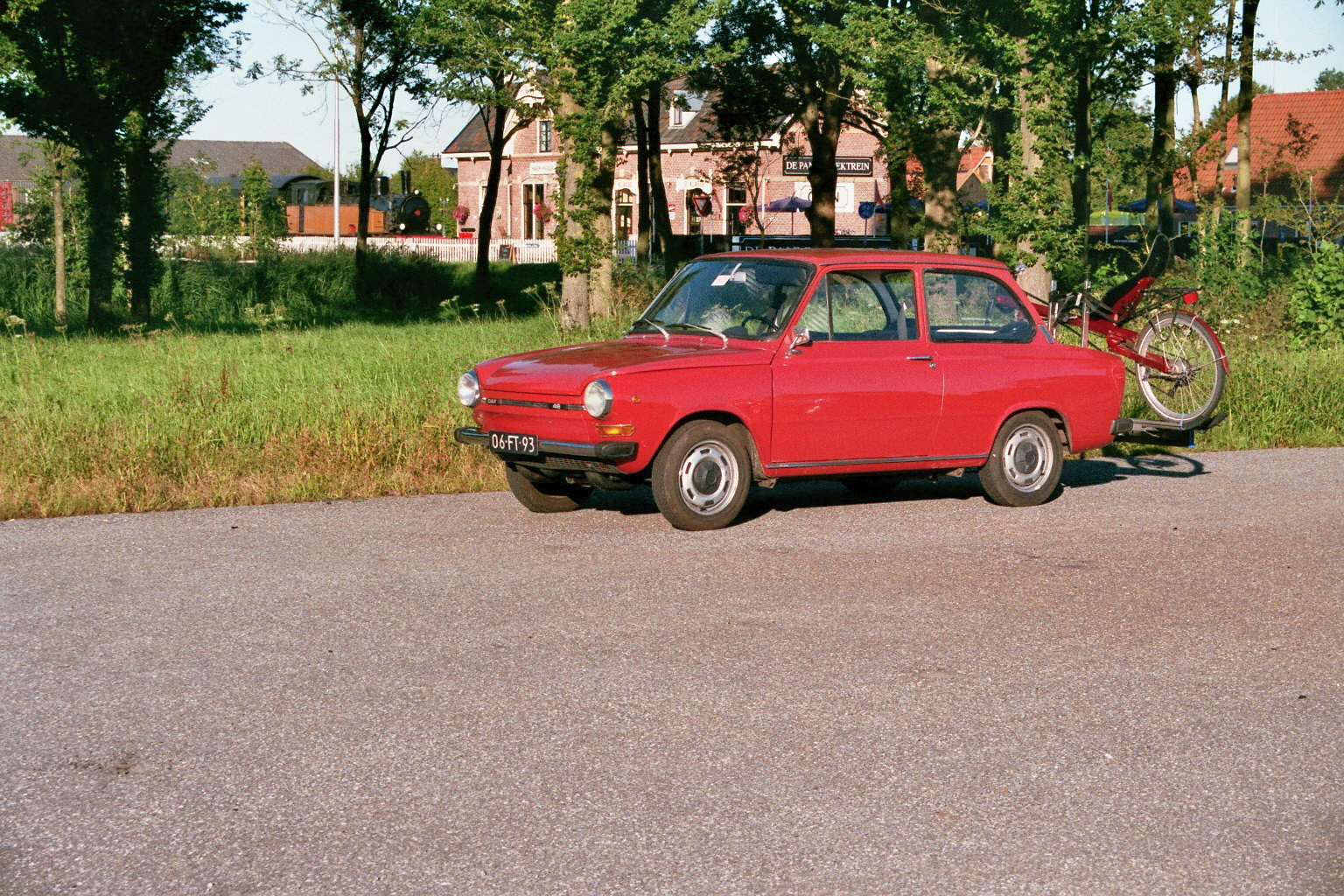
DAF 46 in Westernijtsjerk

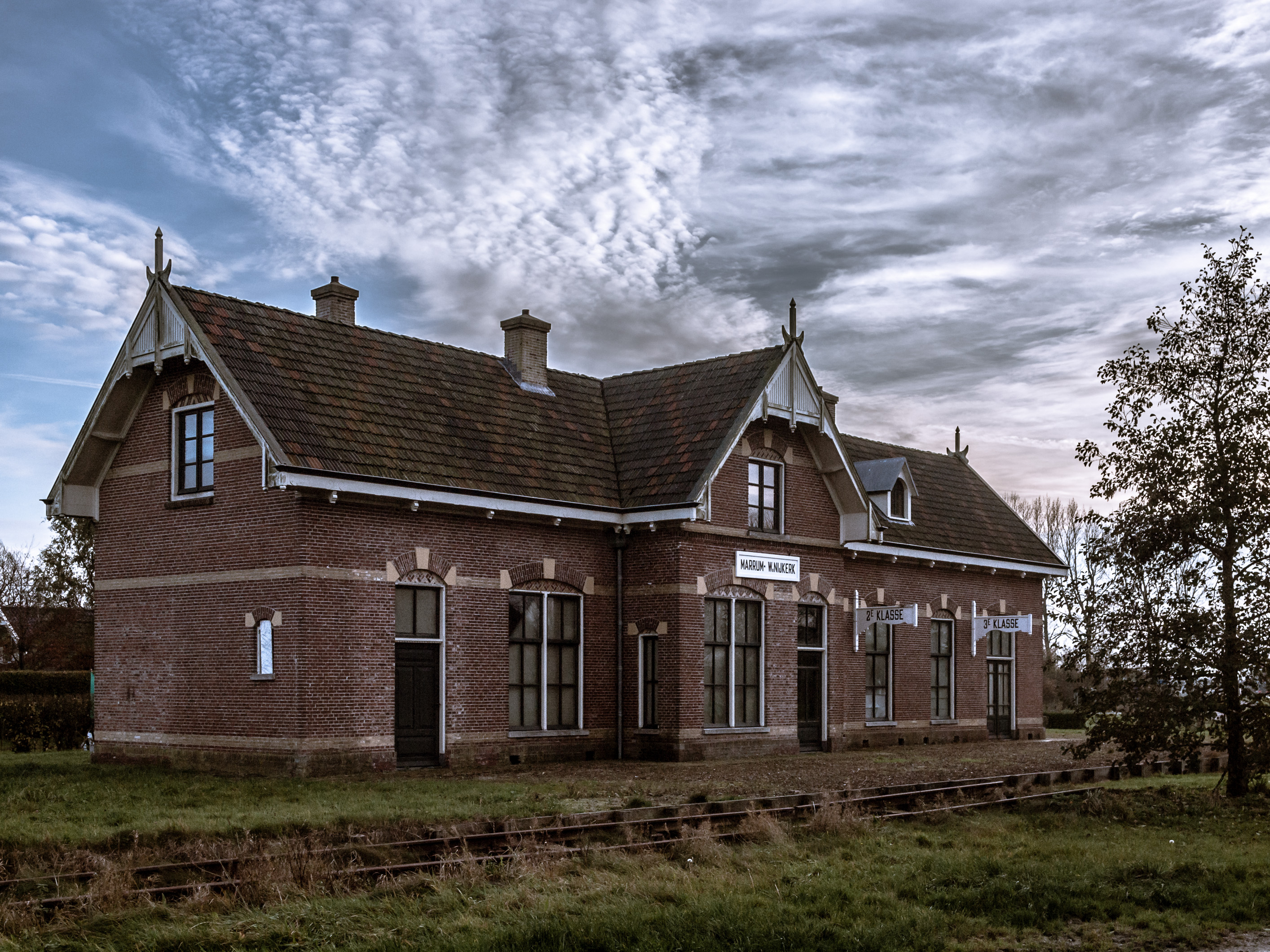
Former train station Marrum-Westernijkerk

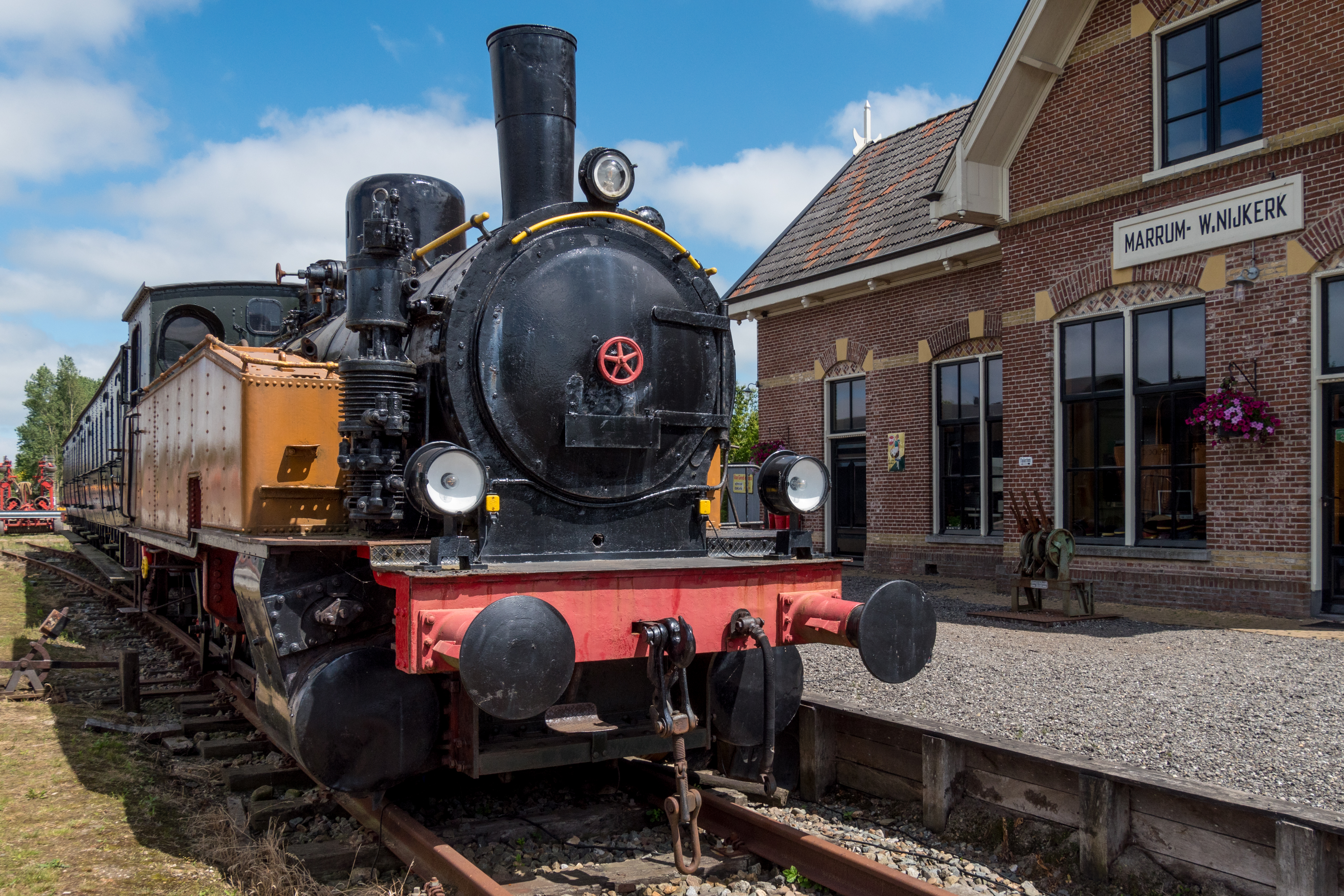
Steam train
