= Dyksterhuzen =

Dyksterhuzen Dijksterhuizen (Dutch)
- Hamlet
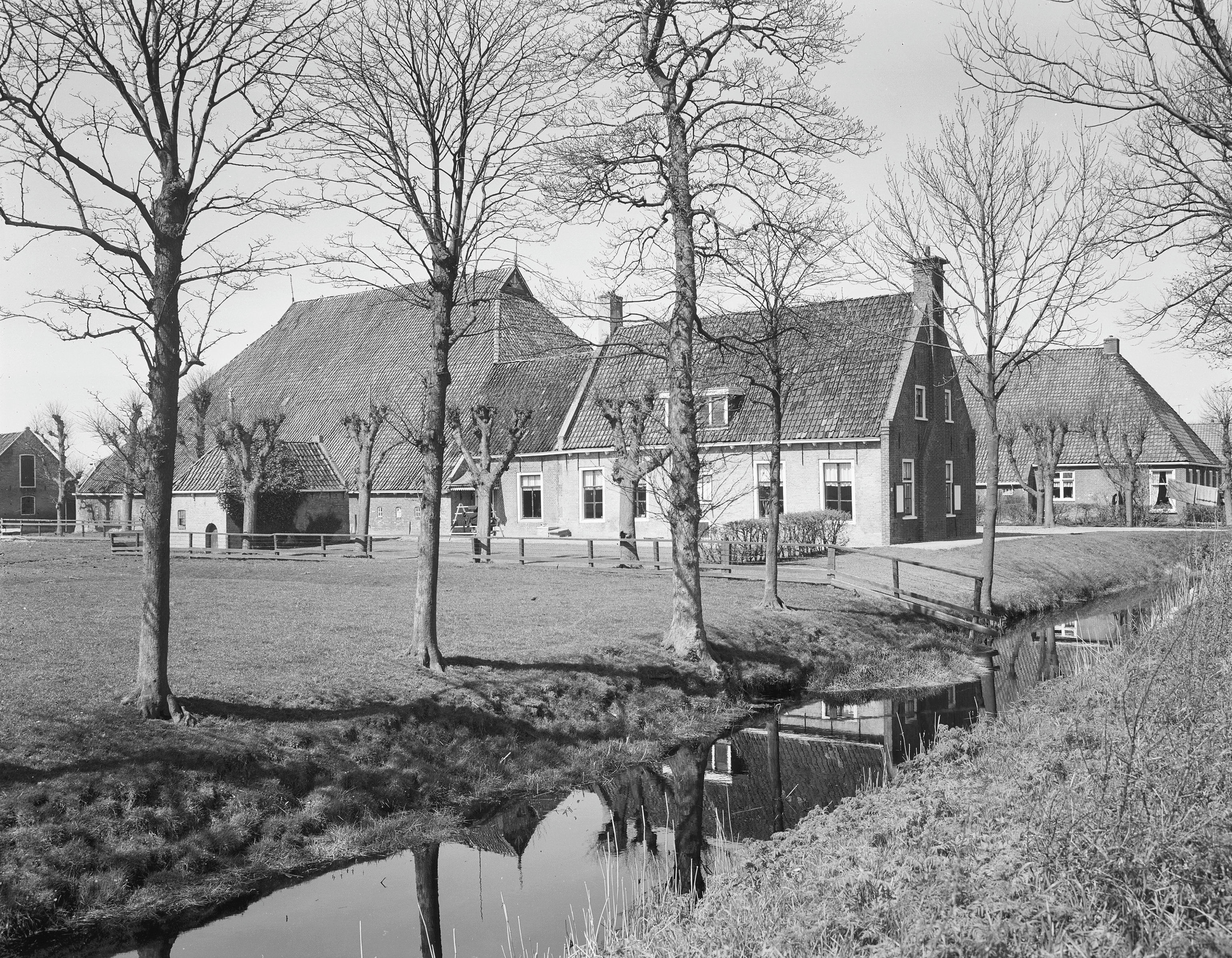
- Farm in Dyksterhuzen, 1966

- Location in the province of Friesland in the Netherlands Dyksterhuzen (Netherlands)
- Coordinates: 53.23265°N 5.72321°E
- Country: Netherlands
- Province: Friesland
- Municipality: Waadhoeke
- Village: Bitgummole
- Elevation: 1.6 m (5.2 ft)
- Time zone: UTC+1 (CET)
  - Summer (DST): UTC+2 (CEST)
- Postcode: 9045
- Area code: 058

Dyksterhuzen (Dutch: Dijksterhuizen [ˈdɛikstərˌɦœyzə(n)]) is a hamlet in the Dutch municipality of Waadhoeke in the province of Friesland. It is located northwest of Ingelum and east of Bitgummole, of which it is a part administratively. The settlement of the hamlet is located on the eponymous road, Dyksterhuzen. The residences are both houses and farms. The N398, a trunk road, forms the division between the hamlet and the village of Bitgummole.

== History ==
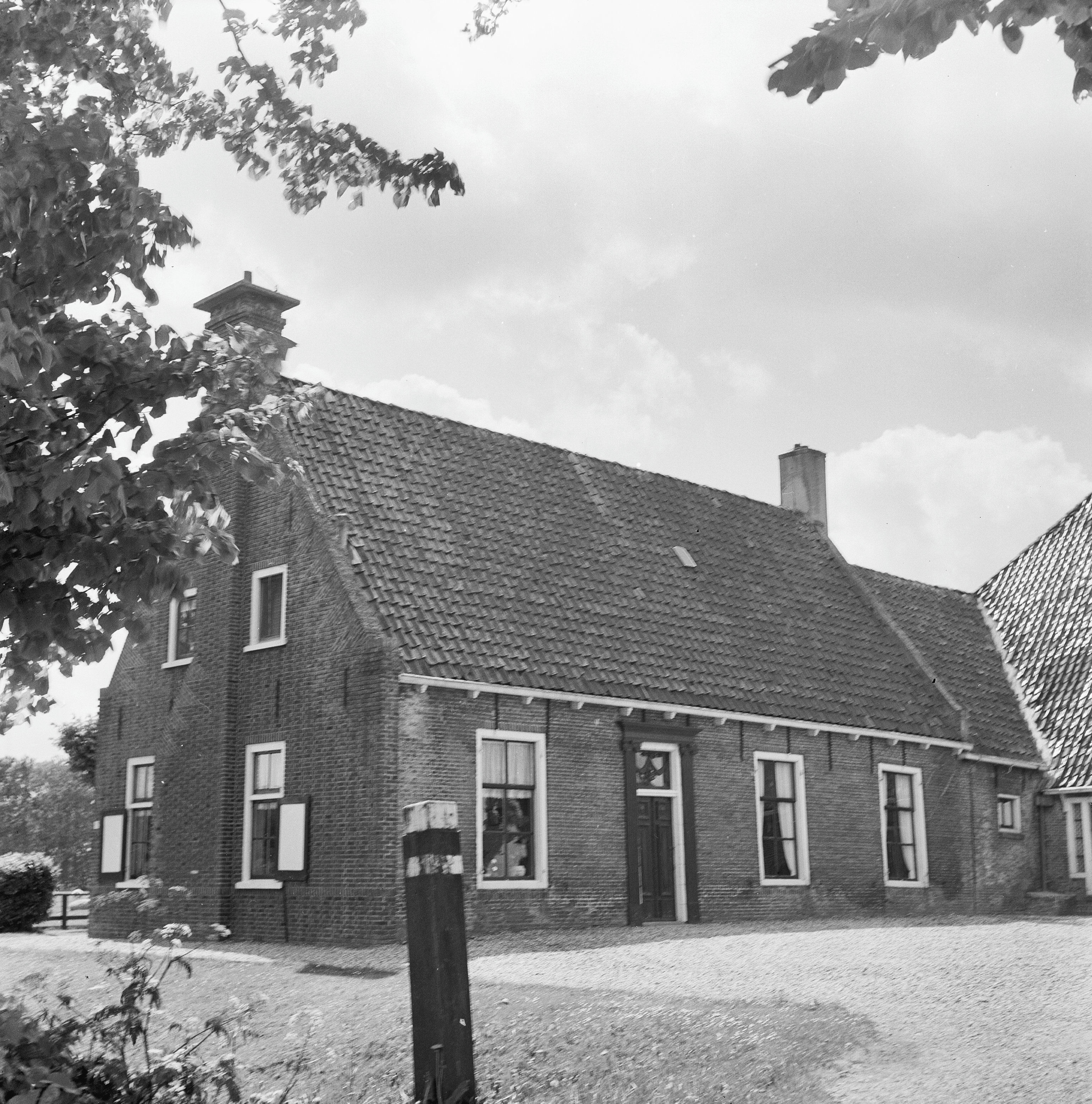
Close-up of a typical Frisian farmhouse in Dyksterhuzen

Dyksterhuzen is actually the original center from which Bitgummole emerged. Dyksterhuzen was a small road village located east of the village area of Bitgum, on the dyke of the Middelzee. The place was mentioned in 1502 as Dyckstrahusen.

In the 16th century, a corn mill and rye mill was built near the border with Bitgum by the residents of the Groot Terhorne stins. This created a new core of habitation. This new center was referred to in 1622 as Beetgumer Meulen. Dyksterhuzen itself was cited as Dijctra-huysen in that year and in 1664 the place names By de Molen and Dyxterhuysen were used.

The place names were then also used interchangeably, and the places were part of Bitgum. In the early twentieth century, Bitgummole started to grow and slowly became a village itself. In 1963 it obtained village status and since then Dyksterhuzen has been a hamlet of this village.

Currently located in the municipality of Waadhoeke, Dyksterhuzen belonged to Menameradiel until the municipal reorganization of 2018. Having been part of Menameradiel, the hamlet's official name is in West Frisian since 2010, as opposed to the Dutch variant.
