= Doijum =

Doijum Doaium (West Frisian)
- Hamlet
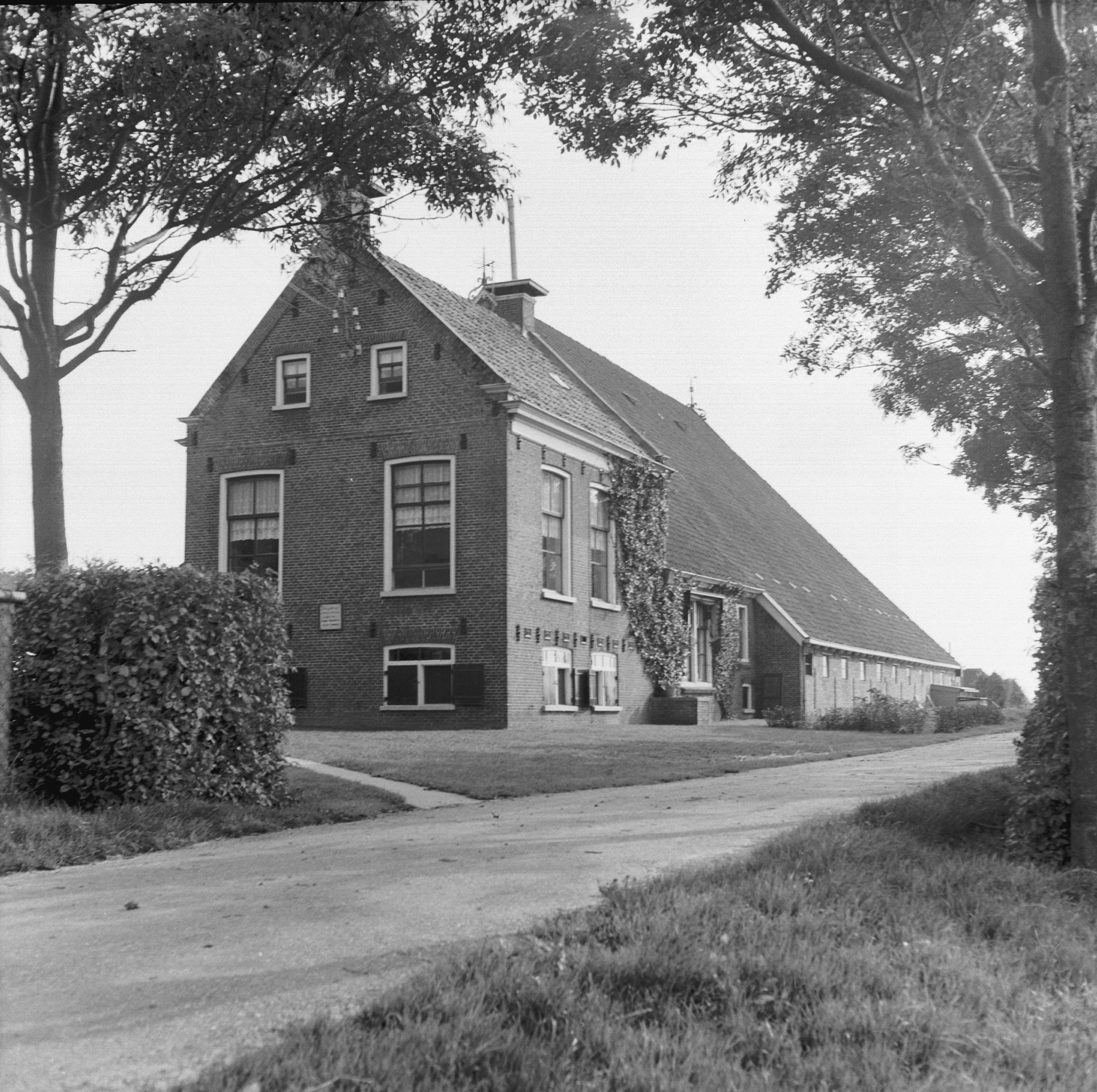
- Farmhouse in Doijum, 1887

- Location in the province of Friesland in the Netherlands Doijum (Netherlands)
- Coordinates: 53.16474°N 5.53161°E
- Country: Netherlands
- Province: Friesland
- Municipality: Waadhoeke
- Town/village: Franeker; Hitzum; Tzum
- Elevation: 0.1 m (0.33 ft)

Population
  - Total: c. 25
- Time zone: UTC+1 (CET)
  - Summer (DST): UTC+2 (CEST)
- Postcode: 8805
- Area code: 0517

Doijum (Dutch pronunciation: [ˈdoːi.ʏm]; West Frisian: Doaium) is a hamlet in the Dutch municipality of Waadhoeke in the province of Friesland. It is located east of Hitzum, southeast of Kie and south of Franeker. The Doijumervaart flows through the hamlet.

The residential area of the hamlet is located on the Franekerweg and Hitzumerweg, between the Binnenpad van Hitzum and the Lollummerweg where it eventually turns into the hamlet of Miedum. It is spread over three settlements in terms of addressing; Hitzum, Franeker and Tzum.

In 1402 the hamlet was mentioned as Dodoghema buren and in 1406 as Do(e)deghum. In 1447 it is mentioned as Doijem. The name derived from a compound of Old Frisian Dodo (a personal name) suffixed with the collectivising suffix -ingi- and hēm ('home, settlement').

Before the municipal reorganization of 1984, the hamlet was divided between two municipalities, the municipality of Franeker and the municipality of Franekeradeel. After that, until 2018, it fell entirely within the merged municipality of Franekeradeel of the same name.
