= Franjumerbourren =

Franjumerbuorren Franjumerburen (Dutch)
- Hamlet
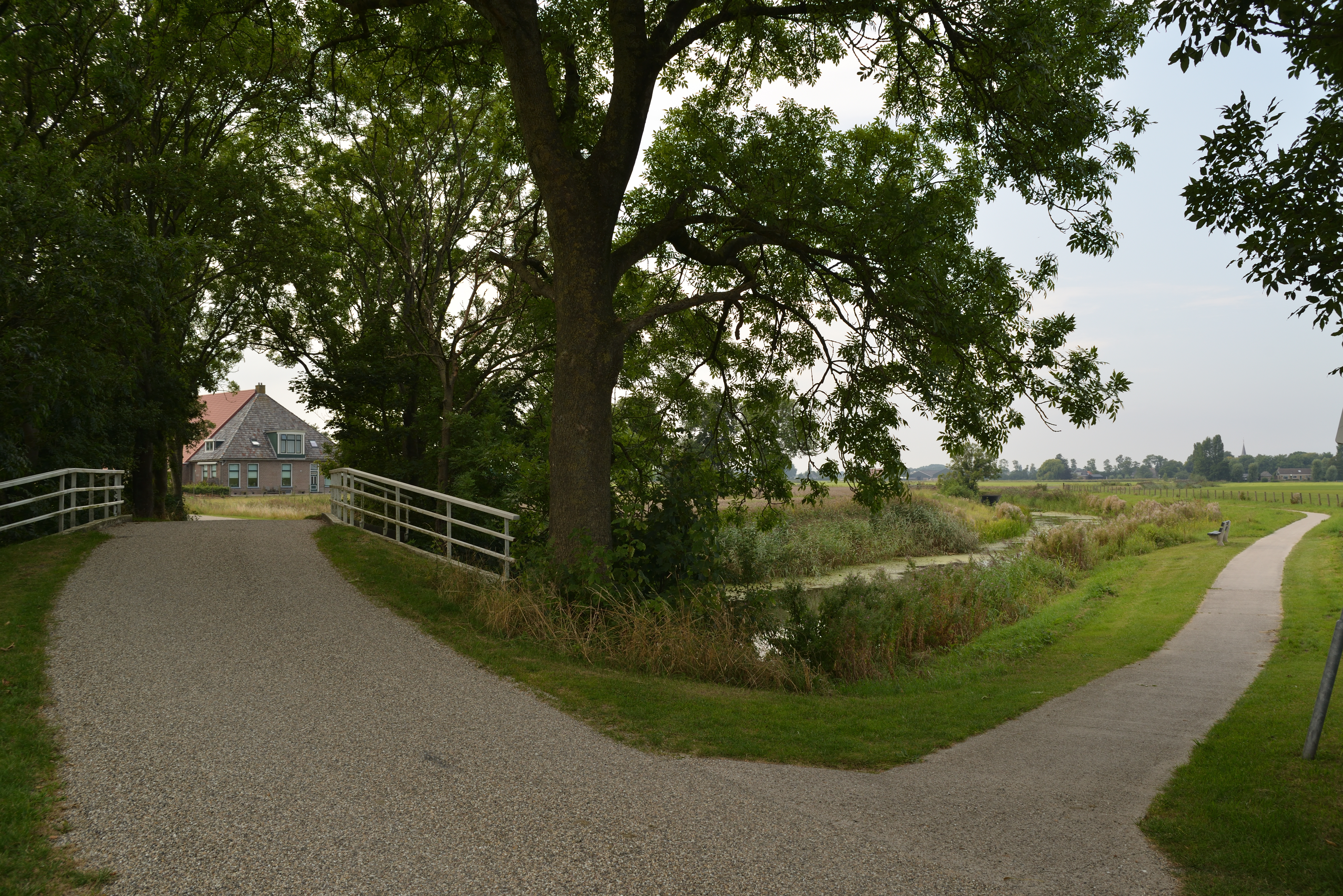
- Landscape of Franjumerbuorren

- Location in the province of Friesland in the Netherlands Franjumerbuorren (Netherlands)
- Coordinates: 53.21800°N 5.71754°E
- Country: Netherlands
- Province: Friesland
- Municipality: Waadhoeke
- Village: Marsum
- Elevation: 1.0 m (3.3 ft)
- Time zone: UTC+1 (CET)
  - Summer (DST): UTC+2 (CEST)
- Postcode: 9034
- Area code: 058

Franjumerbuorren (Dutch: Franjumerburen [ˌfrɑɲʏmərˈbyːrə(n)] or Franjemerburen [ˌfrɑɲəmərˈbyːrə(n)]; Franjum for short) is a hamlet in the Dutch municipality of Waadhoeke in the province of Friesland. It is located south of Ingelum and north of Marsum, of which it is a part administratively. The residences of the hamlet, mainly farmhouses, are located on the road of the same name, Franjumerbourren. The Ingelumer Feart flows through the hamlet.

== History ==
The name of the hamlet was potentially first attested in 944 as Franiglande. The place was–with certainty–first mentioned in 1471 as Franghum, in 1664 as Franjum, around 1700 Franje Buiren and in 1851 as Franjumburen. The place name would refer to the place of residence (-heem/-um) of a lord (frana) and the plural form of buer ('house, cottage') – so no direct reference to the city of Franeker.

The hamlet was partly located on a terp, which has been excavated. The furthest farms in the hamlet indicate the old location of the mound. Until the middle of the 20th century, the number of farms in that corner was slightly higher.

There was a stins located in the hamlet, the Uniastins. The stins was first mentioned in 1511 and demolished in the 1869. Furthermore, there was also a monastery in the hamlet, a Benedictine nunnery. This was closed before 1270 due to a lack of an abbot and finances and the monastery was incorporated into the Premonstratensian monastery in Lidlum and Winsum. However, the nuns moved to Baaium.

Currently located in the municipality of Waadhoeke, Franjumerbuorren belonged to Menameradiel until the municipal reorganization of 2018. Having been part of Menameradiel, the hamlet's official name is in West Frisian since 2010, as opposed to the Dutch variant.
