= Arkens, Franeker =

Windmill in Franeker, Netherlands

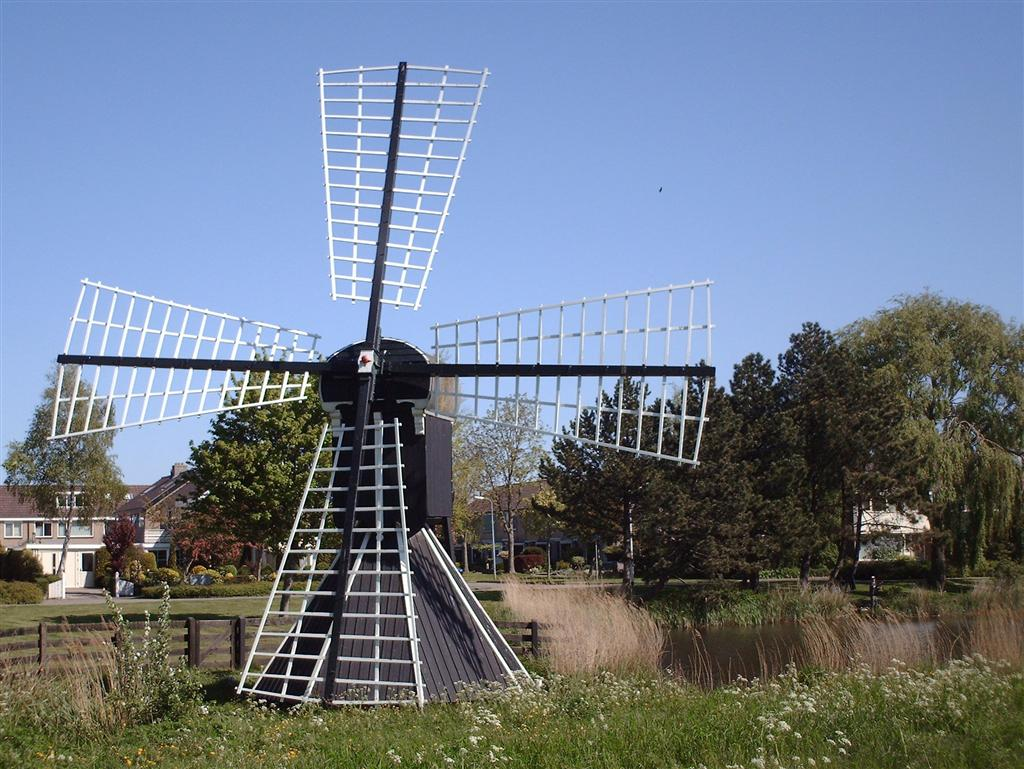
- Arkens, May 2007

Origin
- Mill name: Arkens
- Mill location: Van Andel-Ripkestraat 31, 8802 XA Franeker
- Coordinates: 53°11′16″N 5°44′27″E
- Operator(s): Gemeente Franekeradeel
- Year built: 1972

Information
- Purpose: Drainage mill
- Type: Hollow Post Mill
- Roundhouse storeys: Single storey roundhouse
- No. of sails: Four sails
- Type of sails: Common sails
- Windshaft: Wood
- Winding: Tailpole and winch
- Type of pump: Archimedes' screw

Arkens is a Hollow Post mill in Franeker, Friesland, Netherlands which has been restored to working order. The mill is listed as a Rijksmonument, number 15710. It shares its name with the eponymous hamlet, just north of Franeker, Arkens.

== History ==
Arkens was originally built in 1835 at a site to the north of its current position. It was built to drain the Arkens polder. Prior to 1910, it was fitted with four Patent sails. Photographs show that one pair of the Patent sails were wider at the tip than they were at the heel, the other pair were of standard construction. These were replaced by millwright Westra of Franeker with common sails which are wider at the tip than they are at the heel (Vlinderwieken English: Butterfly sails). Arkens is the only windmill in the Netherlands with this style of sails. A restoration of the mill was undertaken in 1955. The mill was moved to its current position in 1972, restoration taking until 1975. In 1994, a further restoration was carried out. Although restored to working order, Arkens is only rarely seen turning.

== Description ==
Arkens is what the Dutch describe as a spinnenkop (English: Spider mill). It is a hollow post mill on a single storey octagonal roundhouse. The mill is winded by tailpole and winch. The roundhouse and mill body are covered in vertical boards, while the roof of the mill is boarded and covered in dakleer. The sails are Common sails. They have a span of 11.25 metres (36 ft 11 in). The sails are carried on a wooden windshaft constructed from four separate pieces of timber. The windshaft also carries the brake wheel which has 34 cogs. This drives the wallower (18 cogs) at the top of the upright shaft. At the bottom of the upright shaft, the crown wheel, which has 28 cogs drives a gearwheel with 27 cogs on the axle of the Archimedes' screw. The diameter of the axle of the Archimedes' screw measures 235 millimetres (9¼ inches) in diameter; the screw has a 855 millimetres (2 ft 10 in) diameter and a length of 2.43 metres (8 ft 0 in). The screw is inclined at 23°. Each revolution of the screw lifts 160 litres (35 imp gal) of water.
