= Ried, Friesland =

Ried Rie
- Village
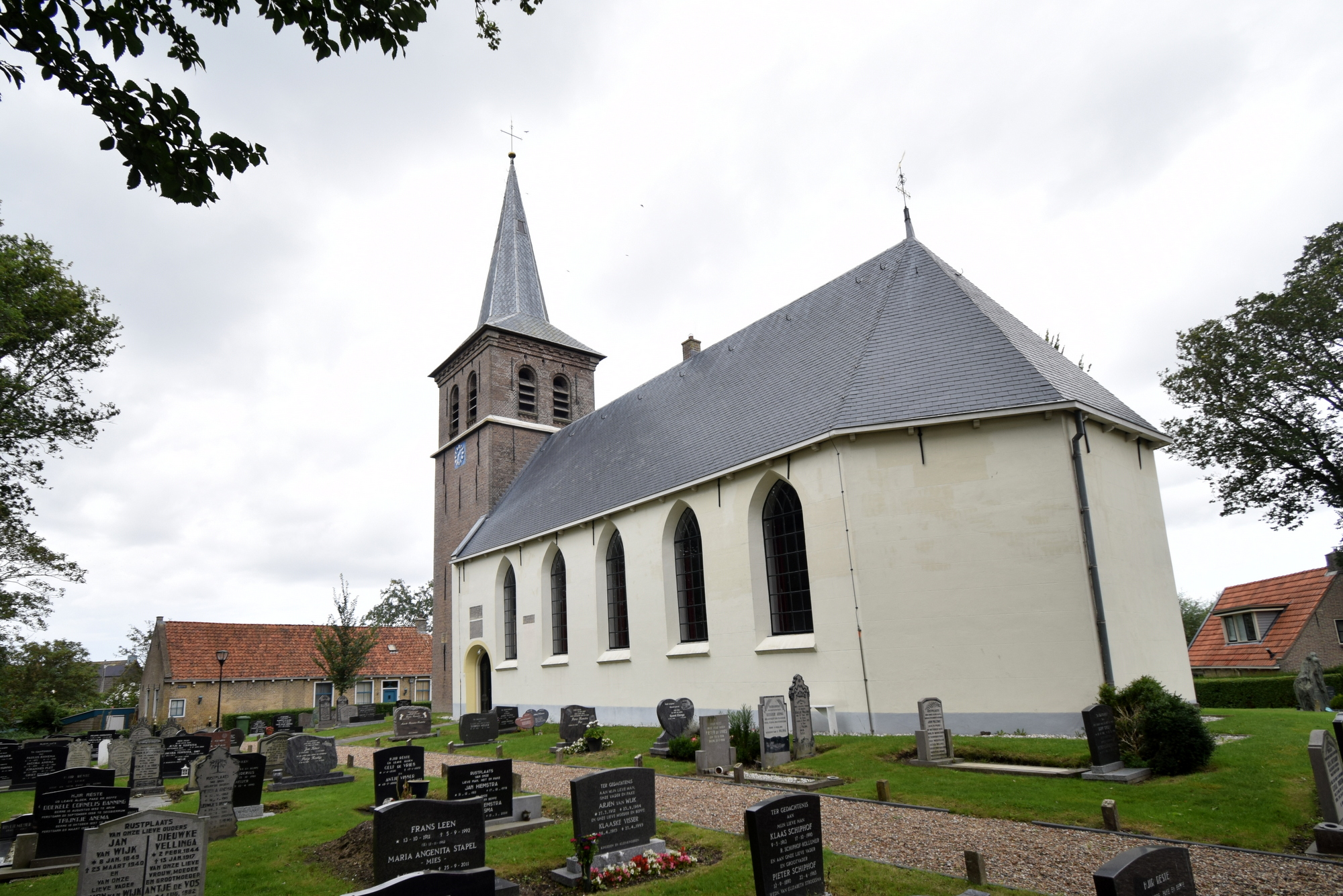
- Church of Ried

- Coat of arms

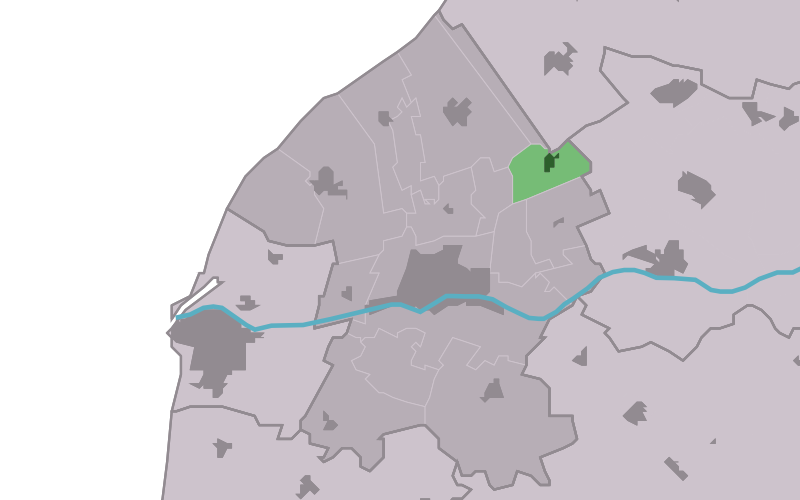
- Location in the Franekeradeel municipality

- Location in the Netherlands Ried (Netherlands)
- Country: Netherlands
- Province: Friesland
- Municipality: Waadhoeke

Area
  - Total: 3.17 km^{2} (1.22 sq mi)
- Elevation: 0.7 m (2.3 ft)

Population (2021)
  - Total: 445
  - Density: 140/km^{2} (364/sq mi)
- Time zone: UTC+1 (CET)
  - Summer (DST): UTC+2 (CEST)
- Postal code: 8811
- Dialing code: 0517
- Website: Official

Ried (Dutch pronunciation: [rit], West Frisian: Rie) is a village in Waadhoeke municipality in the province of Friesland, the Netherlands. It had a population of around 435 in January 2014.

== History ==
The village was first mentioned in 1275 as Rede, and refers to a stream. Ried is a terp (artificial living hill) village which developed several centuries before Christ along the Riedstroom. The tower of Dutch Reformed collapsed and was rebuilt in 1625. The church dates from 1653 and was a replacement of a medieval church.

Ried was home to 246 people in 1840. Between 1858 and 1916, there was a brickworks in Ried. There was also a dairy factory between 1898 and 1935. Until 2018, the village was part of the Franekeradeel municipality.

== Gallery ==
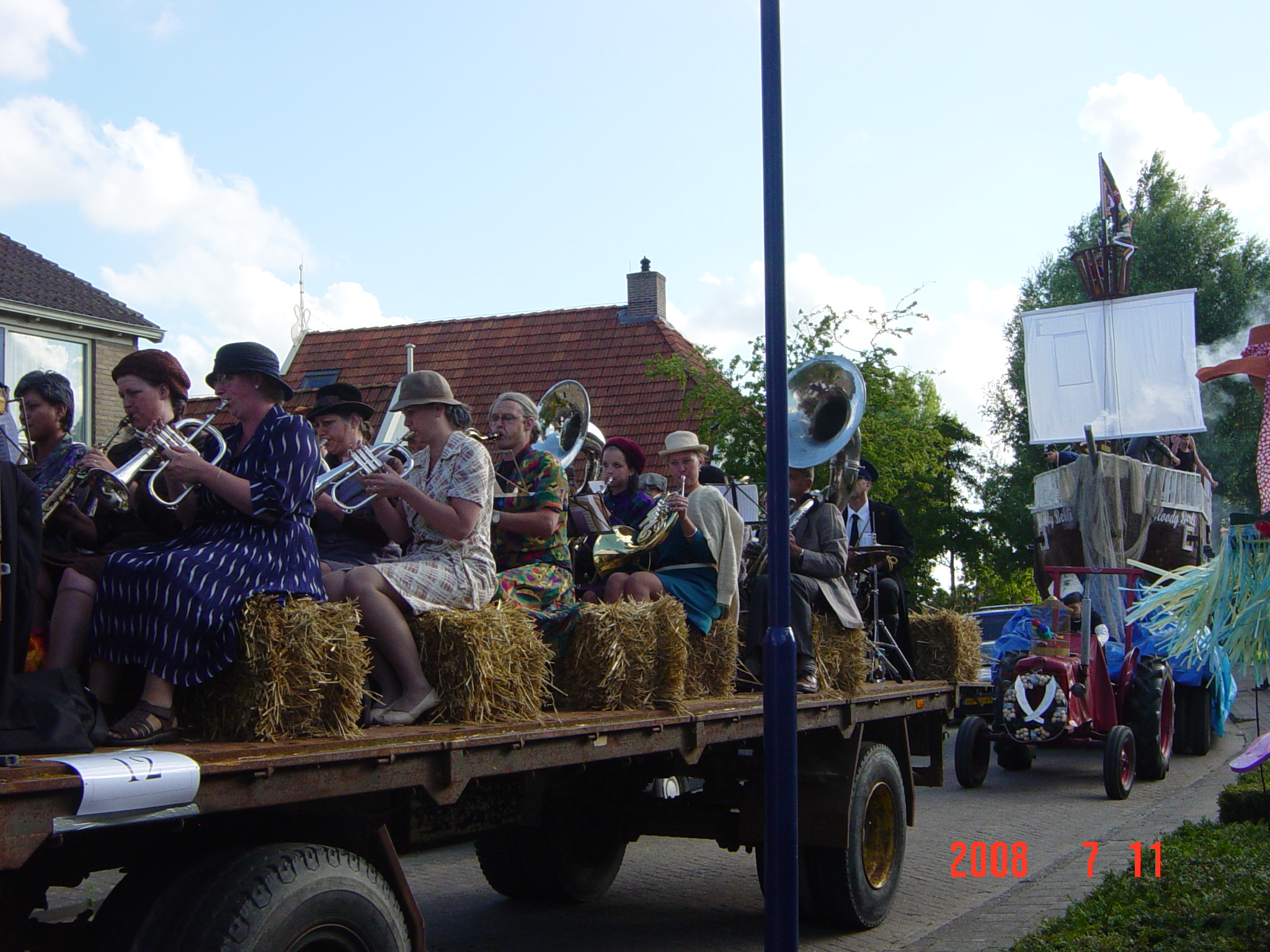
Music parade in Ried

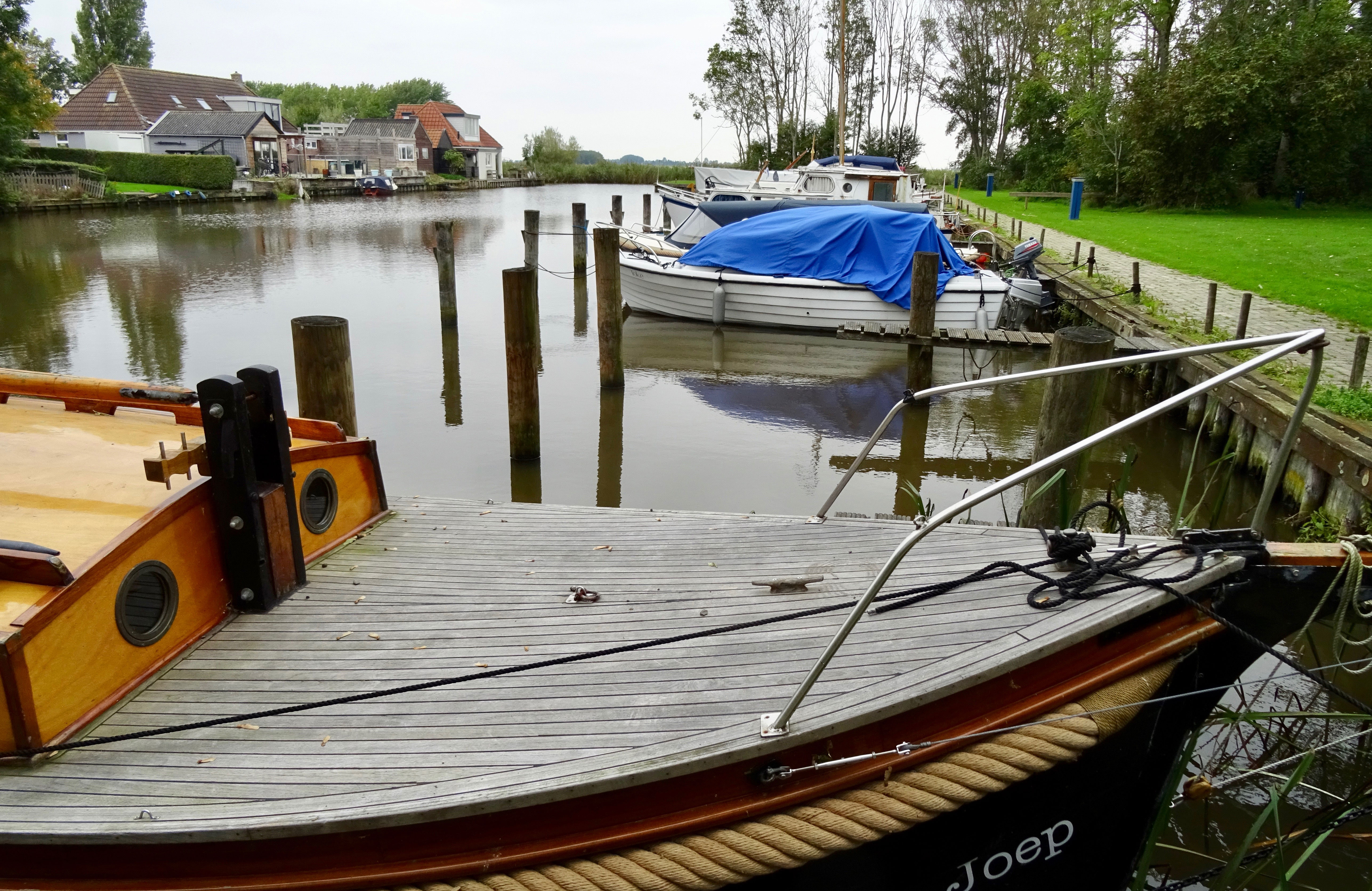
Marina

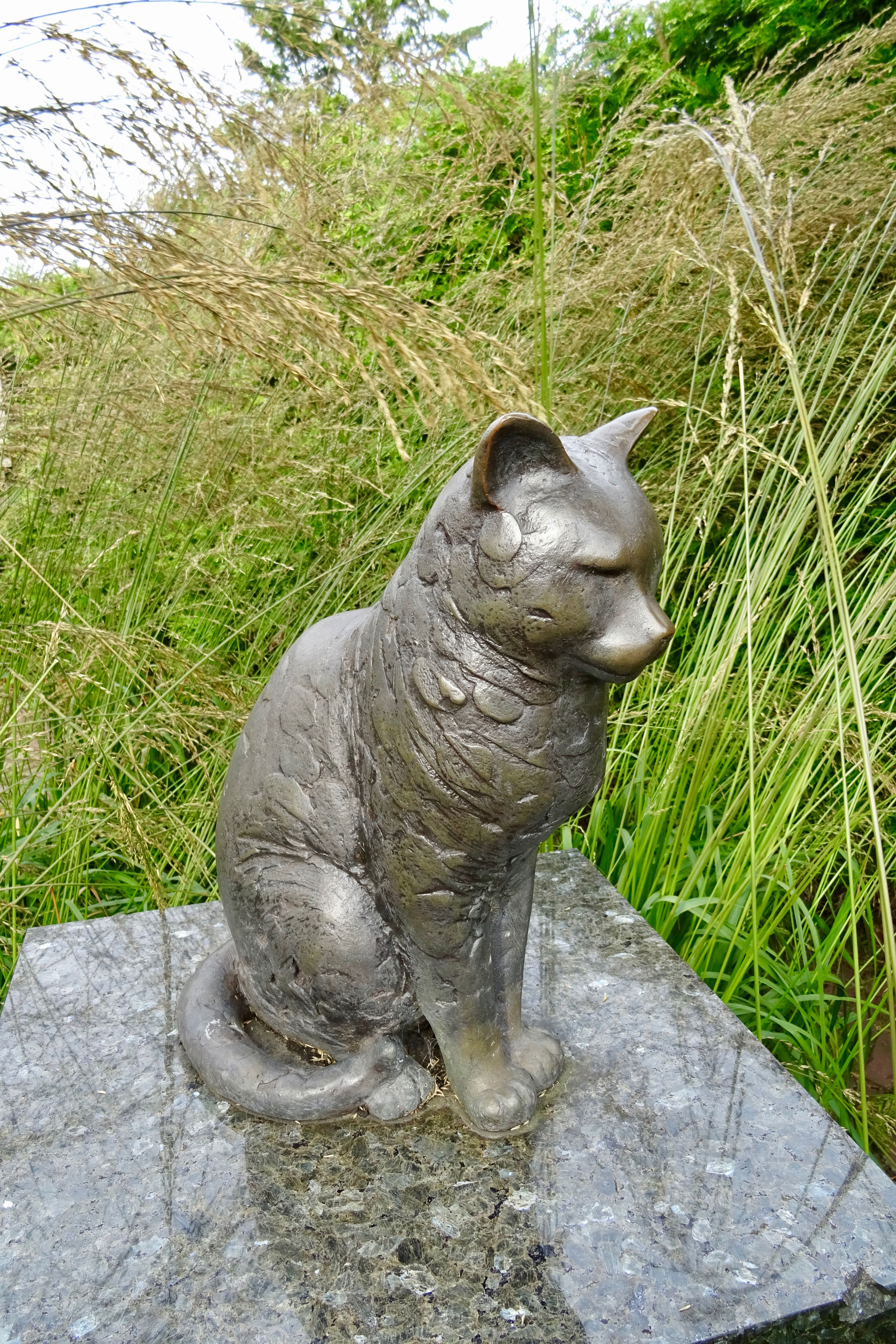
Cat statue

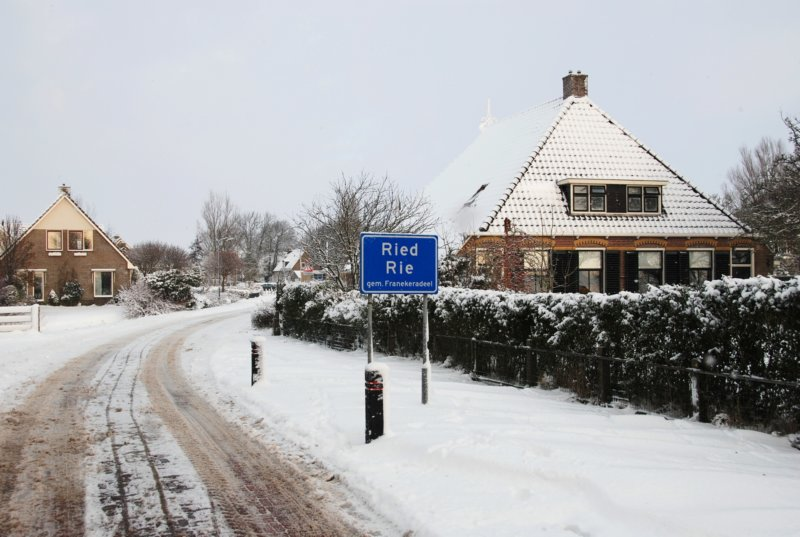
Ried in winter
