= De Vlaren =

De Vlaren De Flearen (West Frisian)
- Hamlet
- Location in the province of Friesland in the Netherlands De Vlaren (Netherlands)
- Coordinates: 53.14992°N 5.53084°E
- Country: Netherlands
- Province: Friesland
- Municipality: Waadhoeke
- Village: Tzum
- Elevation: 0.4 m (1.3 ft)
- Time zone: UTC+1 (CET)
  - Summer (DST): UTC+2 (CEST)
- Postcode: 8804
- Area code: 0517

De Vlaren or Vlaren (Dutch: [də ˈvlaːrə(n)]; West Frisian: De Flearen or De Vlearen) is a hamlet in the Dutch municipality of Waadhoeke in the province of Friesland. It is located northwest of Lollum and southwest of Tzum, of which it is a part administratively. The residences are located on the Lollumerweg as a cluster of loose farms near the Baymerleane.

== History ==
In 1511 the place was mentioned as Flaeren and in 1640 and 1664 as De Flaeren. It is the umbrella name of a number of terpen, of which two are currently known as Klein-Vlaren and Groot-Vlaren (West Frisian: Lytse Flearen and Greate Flearen; 'Small Vlaren' and 'Big Vlaren'). Throughout history, two of these were designated Sikkingaburen and Sidlum. It is known from Sikkengaburen that this is the Klein-Vlaren mound. For this reason, Sidlum is sometimes assumed to be the Groot-Vlaren mound but a possible third mound is not ruled out.

Around 1700 people speak of two places, Vlaaren and Klein Vlaaren, in 1852 of Vlaren and Klein Vlaren, and in 1883 as one place again, as De Vlaren. The place name would refer to the fact that it was located in swampy low land, similar to the meaning of 'vledder'. Vlaren was more common in Friesland as an interpretation. Both the lowercase letter de and the capital letter De appear on maps and documents.

Groot-Vlaren was the largest and highest mound of the place. The mound was excavated around 1875. A squat grave dating from approximately 400 to 200 BC was found in this mound.
