= Waadhoeke =

- Municipality
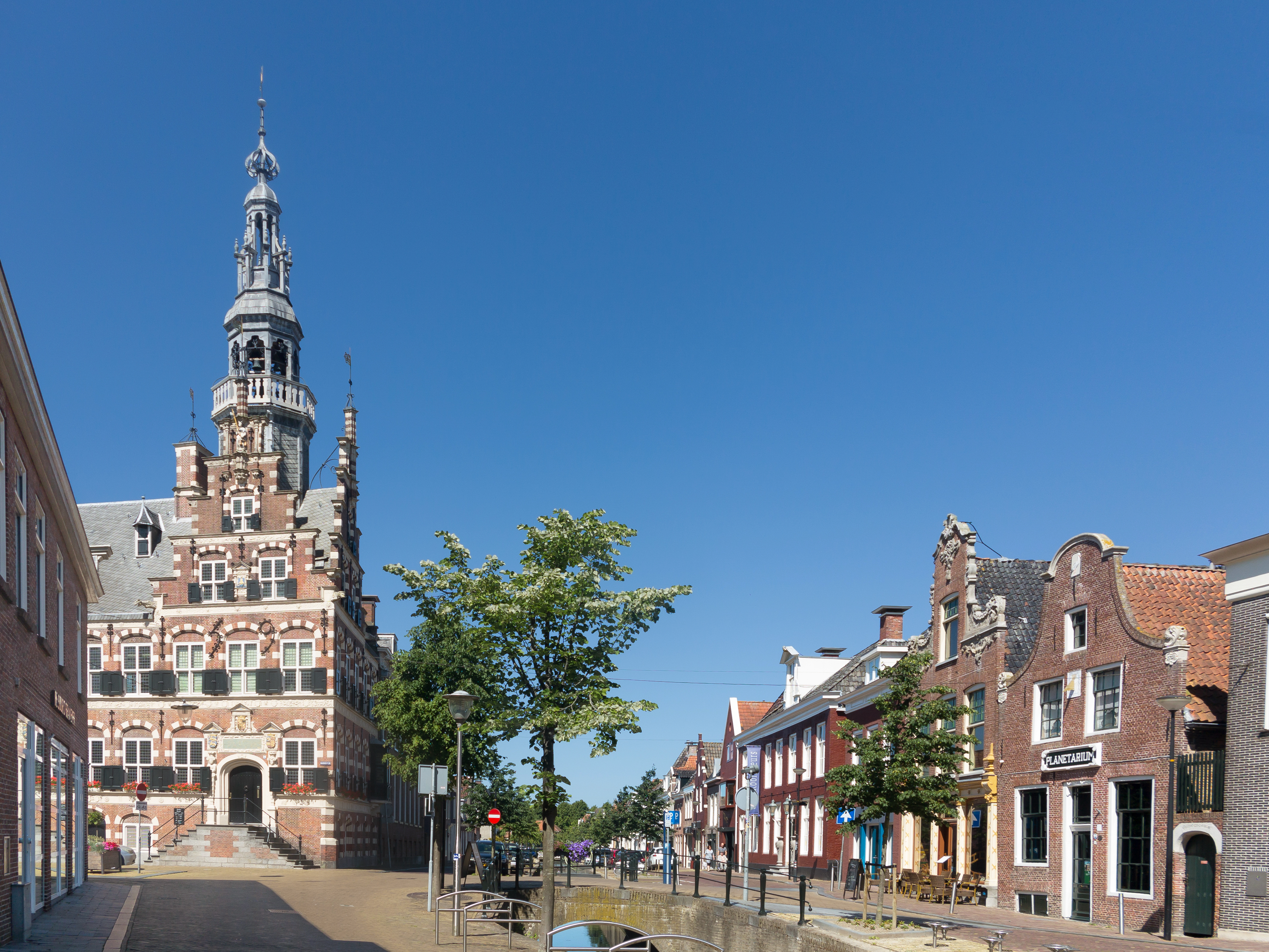
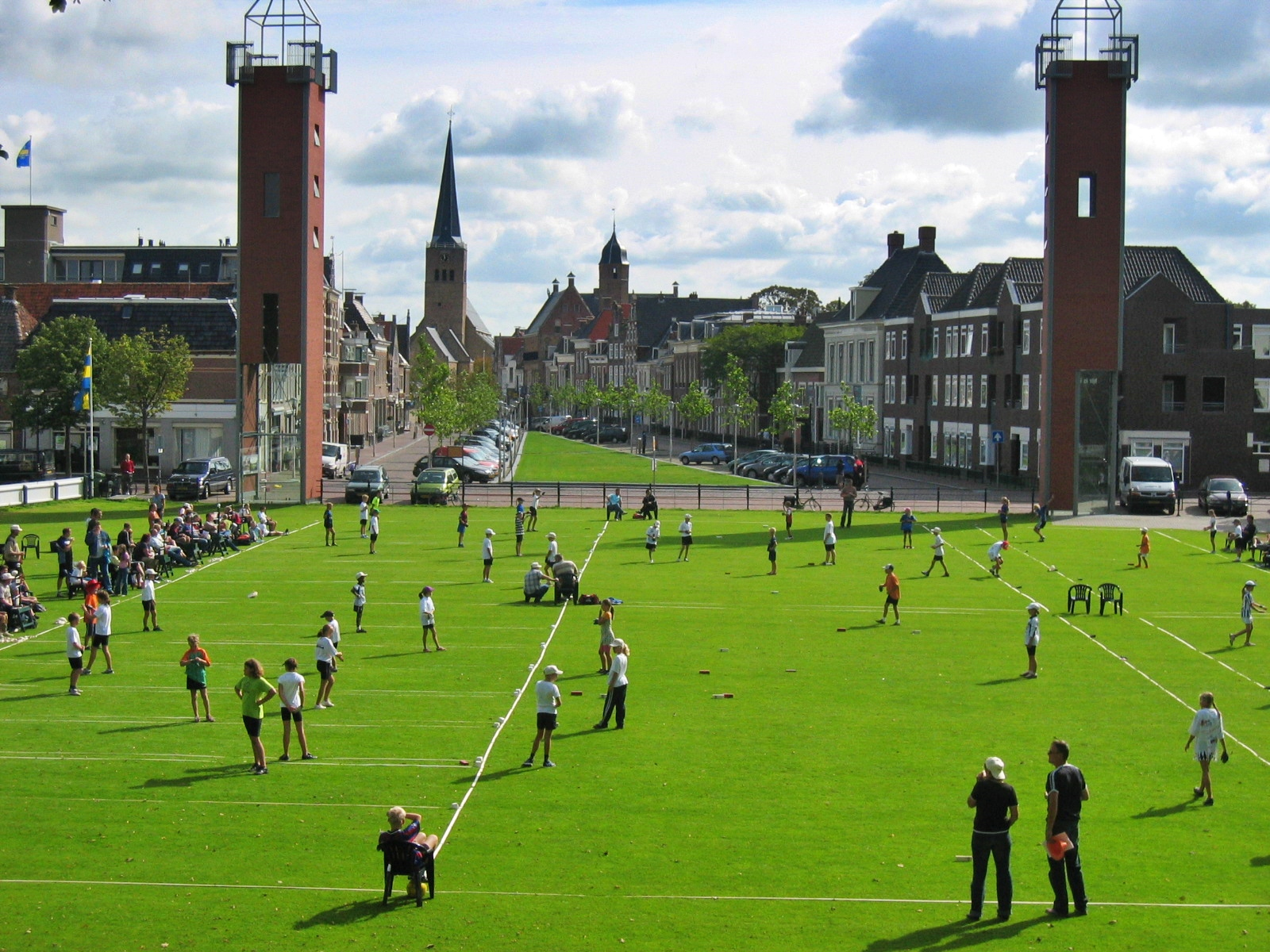
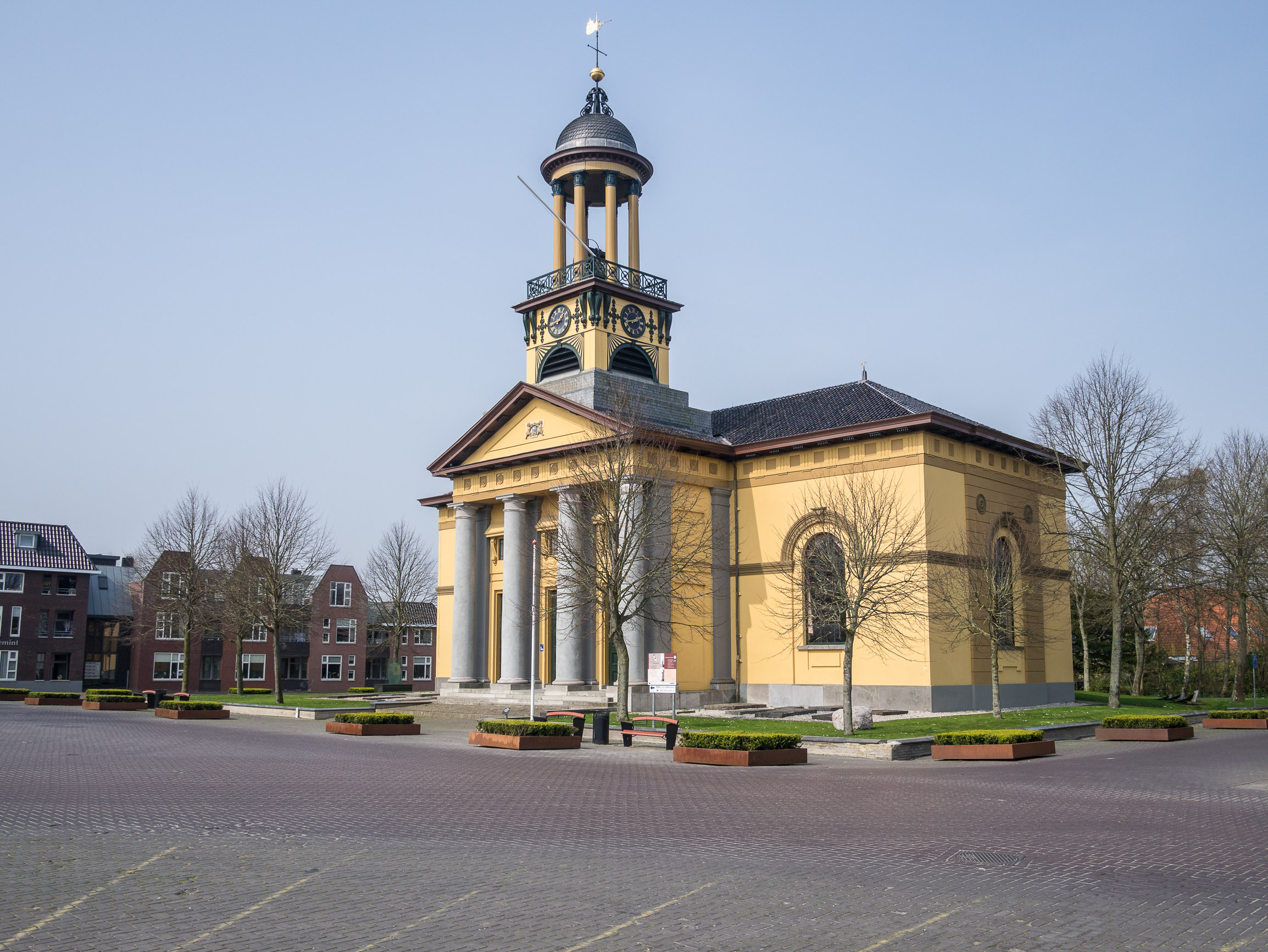
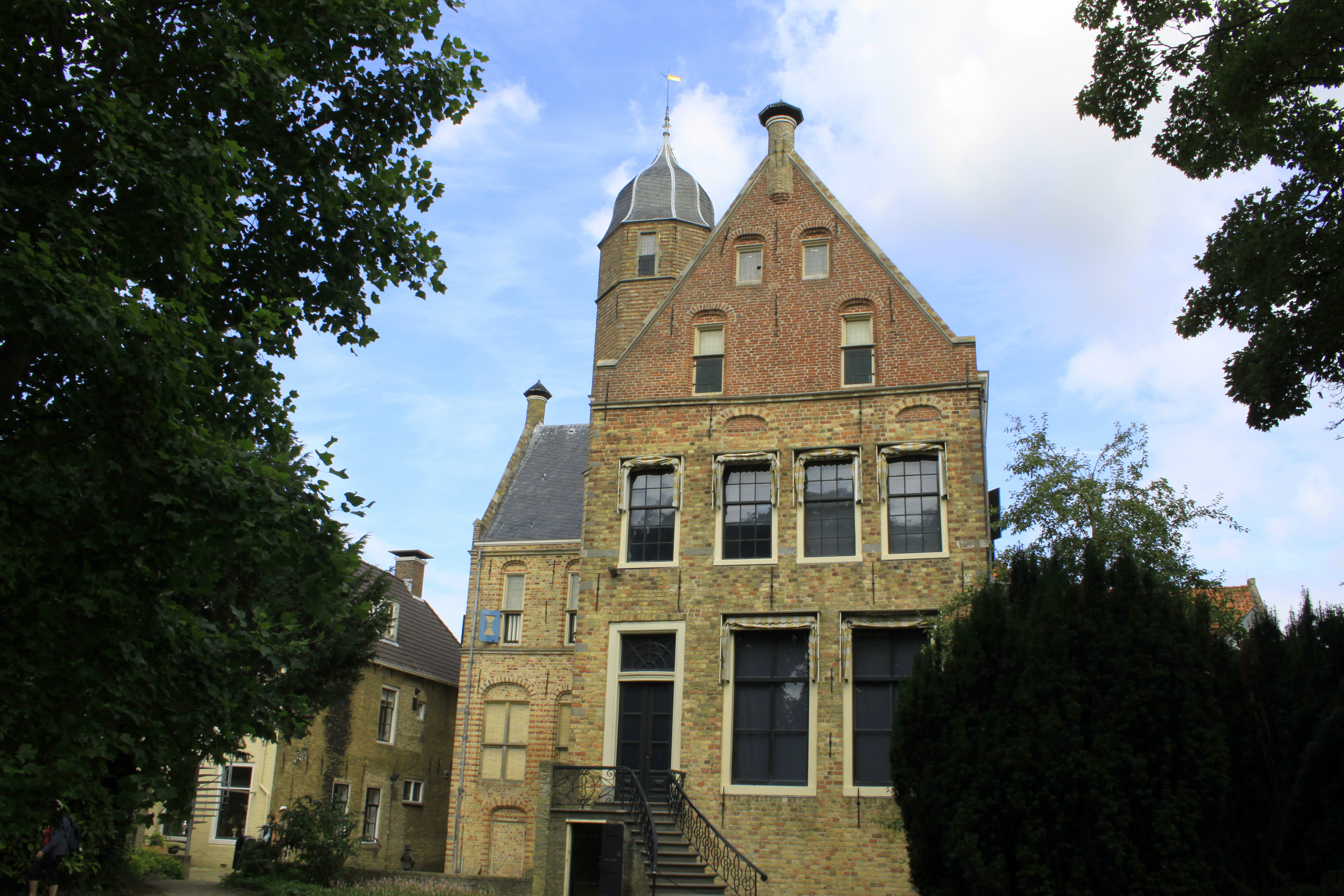
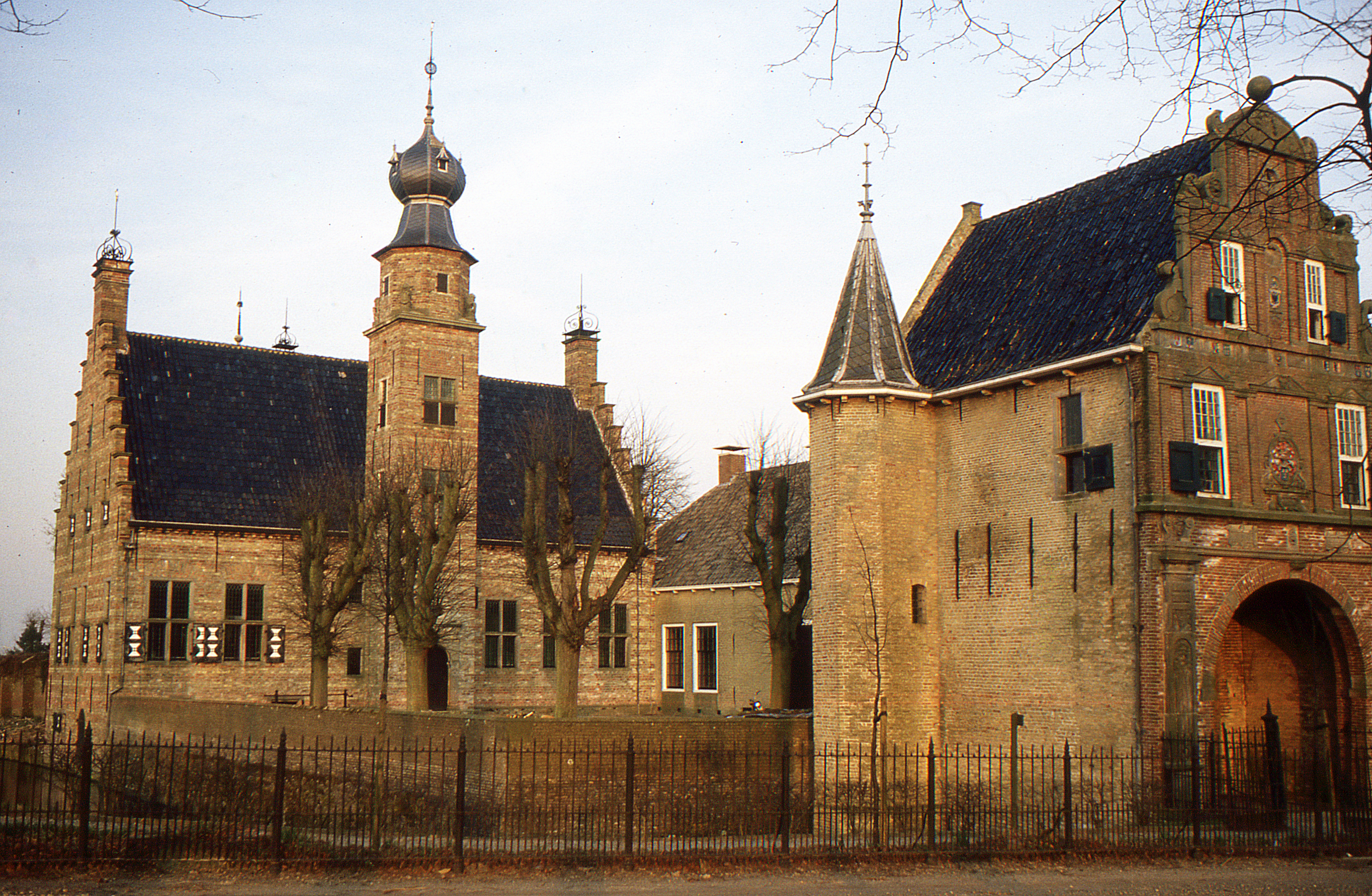
- Franeker City Hall and Planetarium Frisian handball in Franeker Church in Sint Jacobiparochie Martenahuis in Franeker Poptaslot in Marssum

- Flag Coat of arms

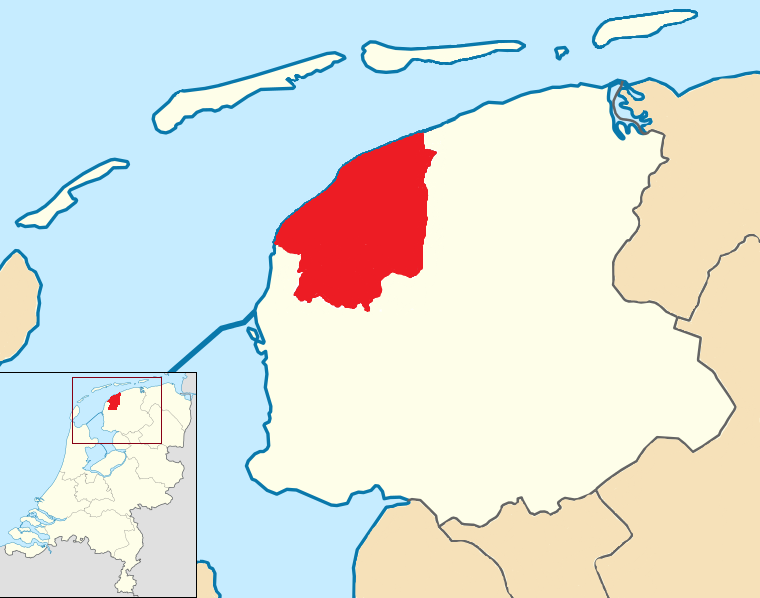
- Location in Friesland
- Coordinates: 53°11′N 5°32′E
- Country: Netherlands
- Province: Friesland
- Established: 1 January 2018

Government
  - Body: Municipal council
  - Burgemeester: Marga Waanders (PvdA)

Area
  - Total: 315.26 km^{2} (121.72 sq mi)
  - Land: 284.86 km^{2} (109.99 sq mi)
  - Water: 30.4 km^{2} (11.7 sq mi)
- Time zone: UTC+1 (CET)
  - Summer (DST): UTC+2 (CEST)
- Postcode: Parts of 8800 and 9000 range
- Area code: 0515, 0517, 0518, 058
- Website: www.waadhoeke.nl

Waadhoeke is a municipality of Friesland in the northern Netherlands. It was established 1 January 2018 and consists of the former municipalities of Franekeradeel, het Bildt, Menameradiel and parts of Littenseradiel, all four of which were dissolved on the same day.

The municipality is located in the province of Friesland, in the north of the Netherlands. Waadhoeke is bordered by Harlingen, Terschelling, Noardeast-Fryslân, Leeuwarden and Súdwest-Fryslân. The population in January 2019 was 46,133. It is Friesland's sixth most populous municipality. The largest population centre (2018 population, 12,793) is Franeker. The residents speak Dutch, West Frisian or Bildts (a dialect in the former municipality het Bildt).

== Etymology ==
The municipality is named after the Wadden Sea (West Frisian: Waadsee). The municipality is a part or corner (West Frisian: hoeke) of the province of Friesland.

== Population centres ==
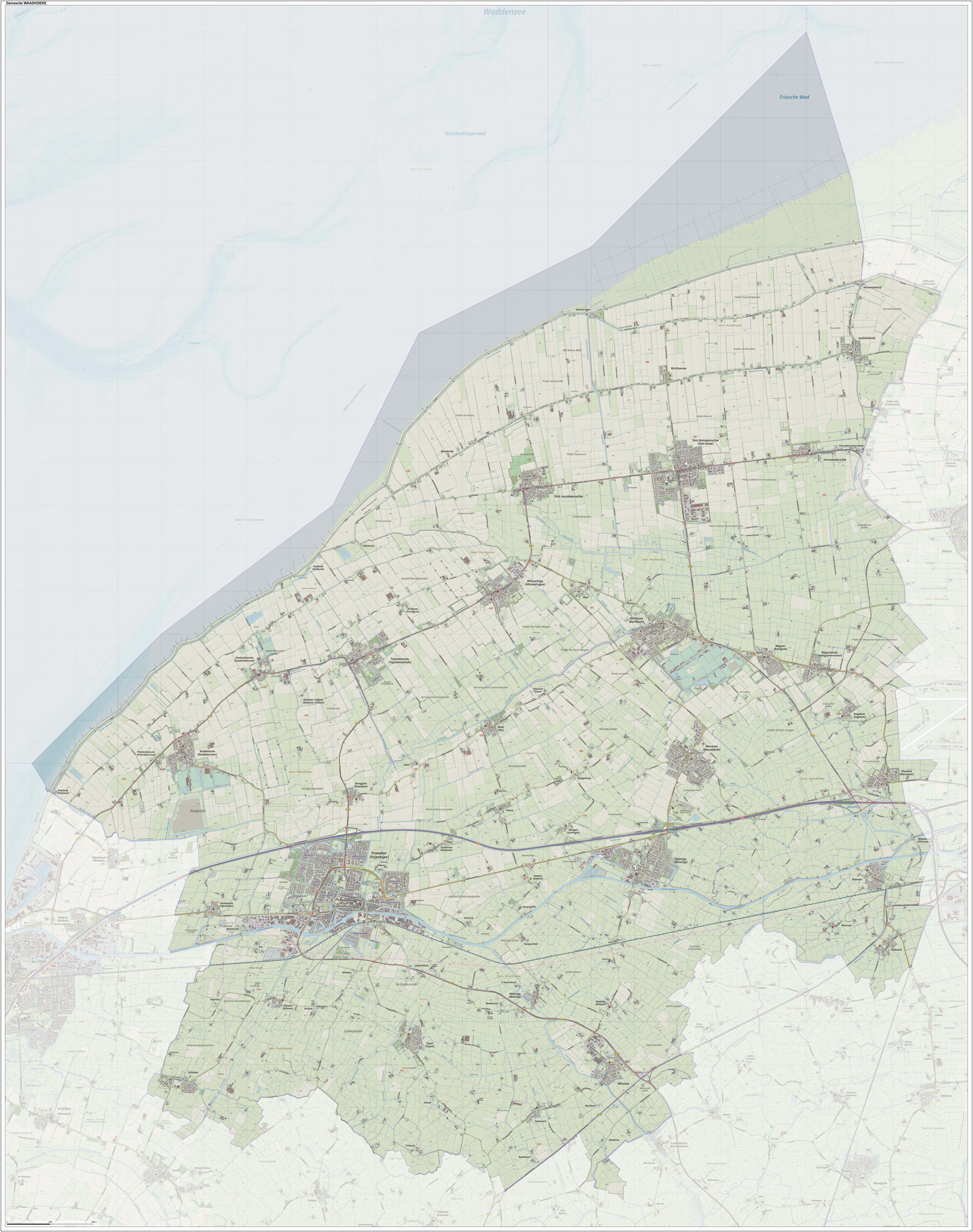
Map of municipality of Waadhoeke, February 2024

The municipality consists of 41 settlements of which Franeker is the seat of government.

Dutch name	West Frisian name	Population
Franeker	Frjentsjer	12,793
Sint Annaparochie	Sint-Anne	4,832
Dronrijp	Dronryp	3,291
Menaldum	Menaam	2,652
Berlikum	Berltsum	2,513
Minnertsga	Minnertsgea	1,763
Sexbierum	Seisbierrum	1,721
Sint Jacobiparochie	Sint-Jabik	1,702
Tzummarum	Tsjummearum	1,373
Tzum	Tsjom	1,138
Marssum	Marsum	1,042
Winsum	Winsum	1,025
Deinum	Deinum	979
Oudebildtzijl	Aldebiltsyl	974
Beetgumermolen	Bitgummole	908
Beetgum	Bitgum	804
Vrouwenparochie	Froubuorren	697
Achlum	Achlum	611
Oosterbierum	Easterbierrum	517
Welsrijp	Wjelsryp	460
Ried	Rie	455
Boksum	Boksum	400
Engelum	Ingelum	385
Dongjum	Doanjum	345
Nij Altoenae	Nij Altena	327
Spannum	Spannum	276
Westhoek	De Westhoek	257
Herbaijum	Hjerbeam	253
Peins	Peins	241
Hitzum	Hitsum	230
Wier	Wier	201
Pietersbierum	Pitersbierrum	140
Schalsum	Skalsum	134
Zweins	Sweins	119
Baijum	Baaium	118
Schingen	Skingen	114
Slappeterp	Slappeterp	88
Blessum	Blessum	86
Firdgum	Furdgum	59
Boer	Boer	41
Klooster-Lidlum	Kleaster-Lidlum	40
Total		46,104

Source: Waadhoeke.nl

A small part of the village Alde Leie lies within the municipality. The settlement of Ritsumazijl is also located in the municipality, but is not (yet) officially considered a village.

=== Hamlets ===
The municipality Waadhoeke contains the hamlets of: 't Heechhout, Arkens, Barrum, Bonkwert, De Kampen, De Oasterein, De Puollen, De Vlaren, Doijum, Dijkshoek, Dyksterhuzen, Fatum, Franjumerbourren, Hatsum, Holprijp, Kie, Kiesterzijl, Kingmatille, Kleaster Anjum, Koehool, Koum, Laakwerd, Lutjelollum, Miedum, Nieuwebildtzijl, Oosthoek, Rewert (partially), Roptasyl (partially), Salverd, Skyldum, Sopsum, Stad Niks, Tallum, Teetlum, Tolsum, Tritzum, Tsjeppenbûr, Vrouwbuurtstermolen (partially), War, Weakens, Westerein and Zwarte Haan.

== Transport ==
A section of the A31 bypasses the towns of Franeker and Dronryp.

Trains operated by Arriva provide passenger services on the Harlingen–Nieuweschans railway, with stops in Franeker, Dronryp and Deinum.

Van Harinxmakanaal is a major canal. It passes Franeker, Dronryp and Deinum.

== Notable people ==
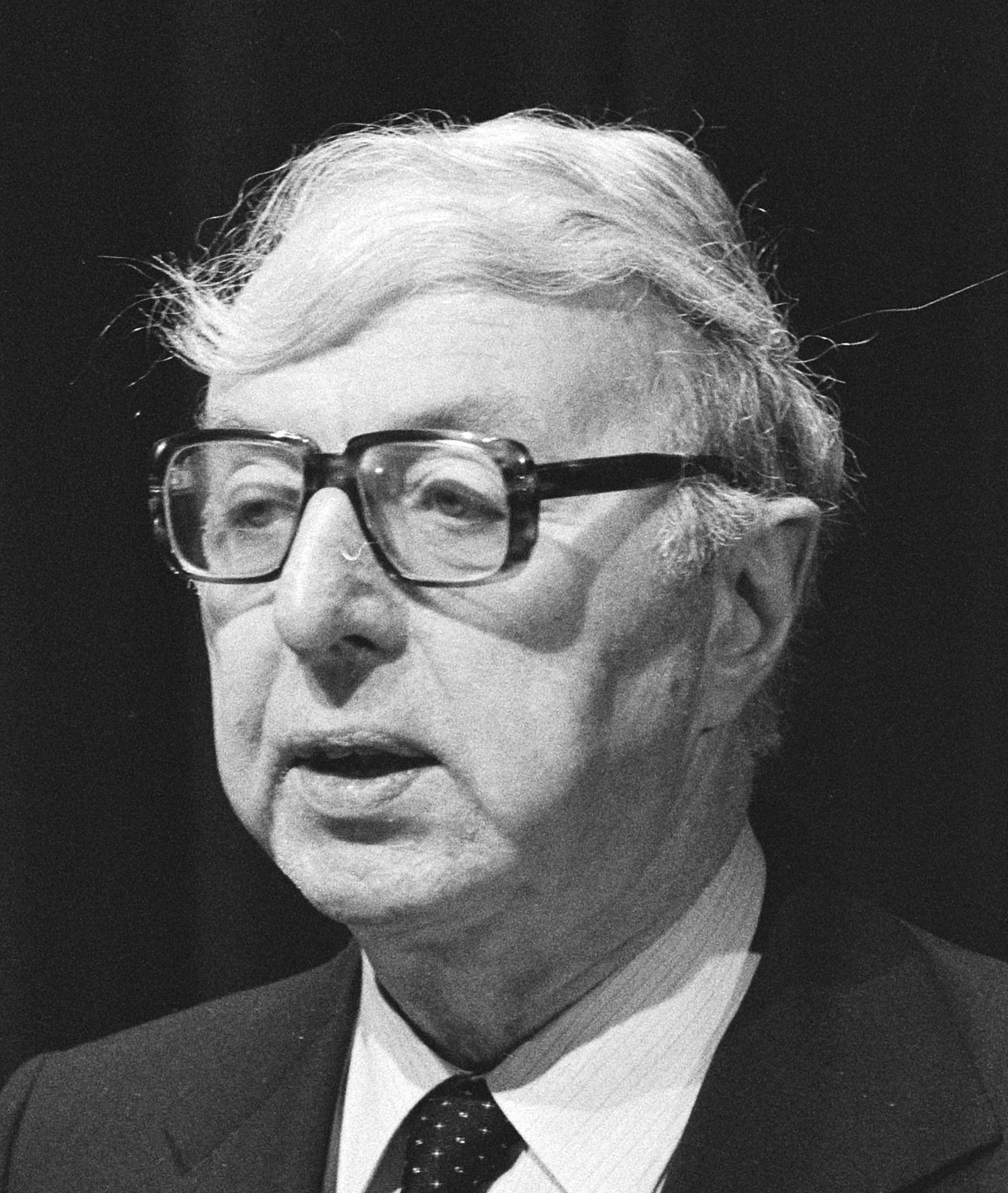
Jelle Zijlstra, 1980

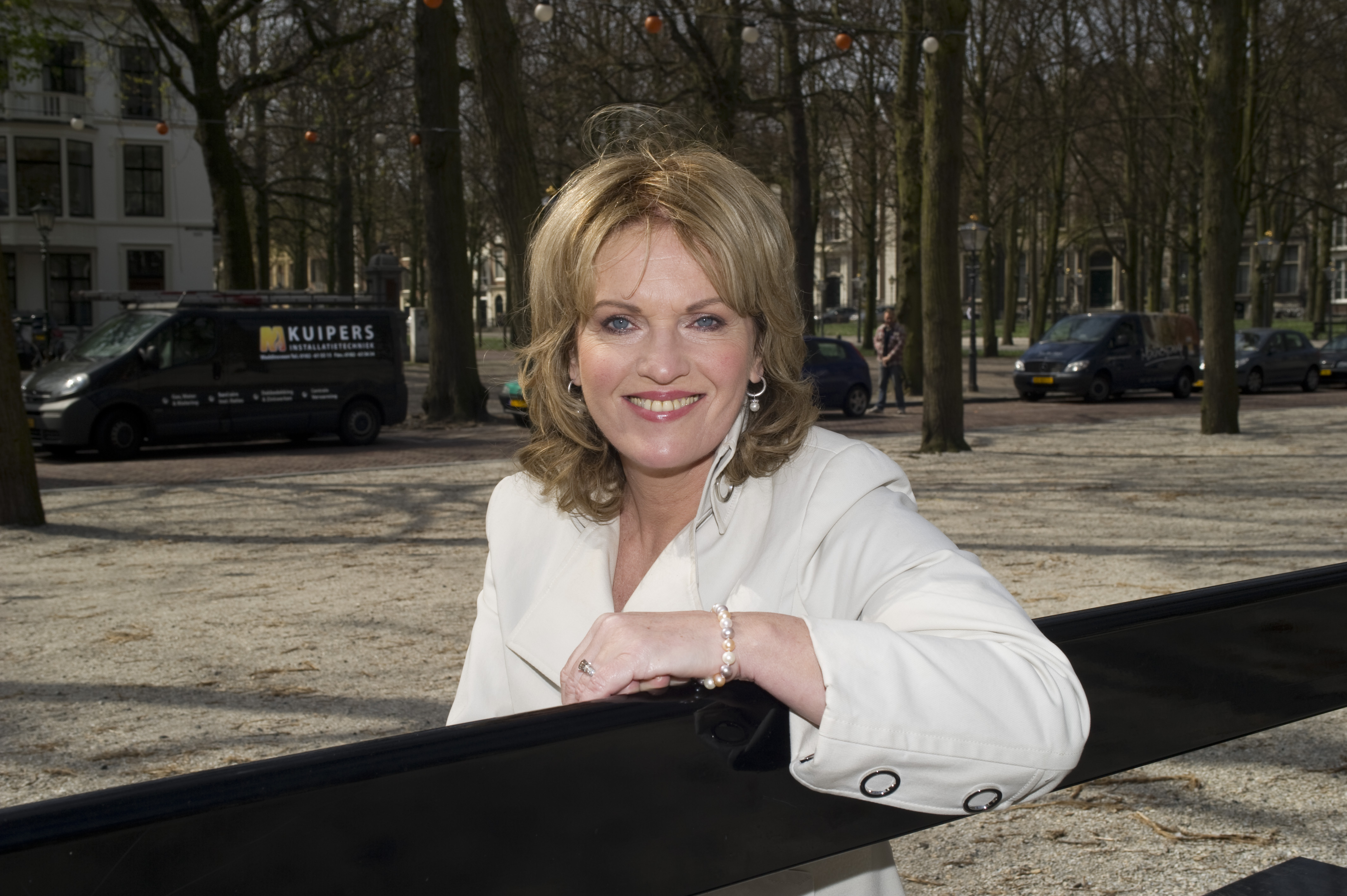
Pia Dijkstra , 2010

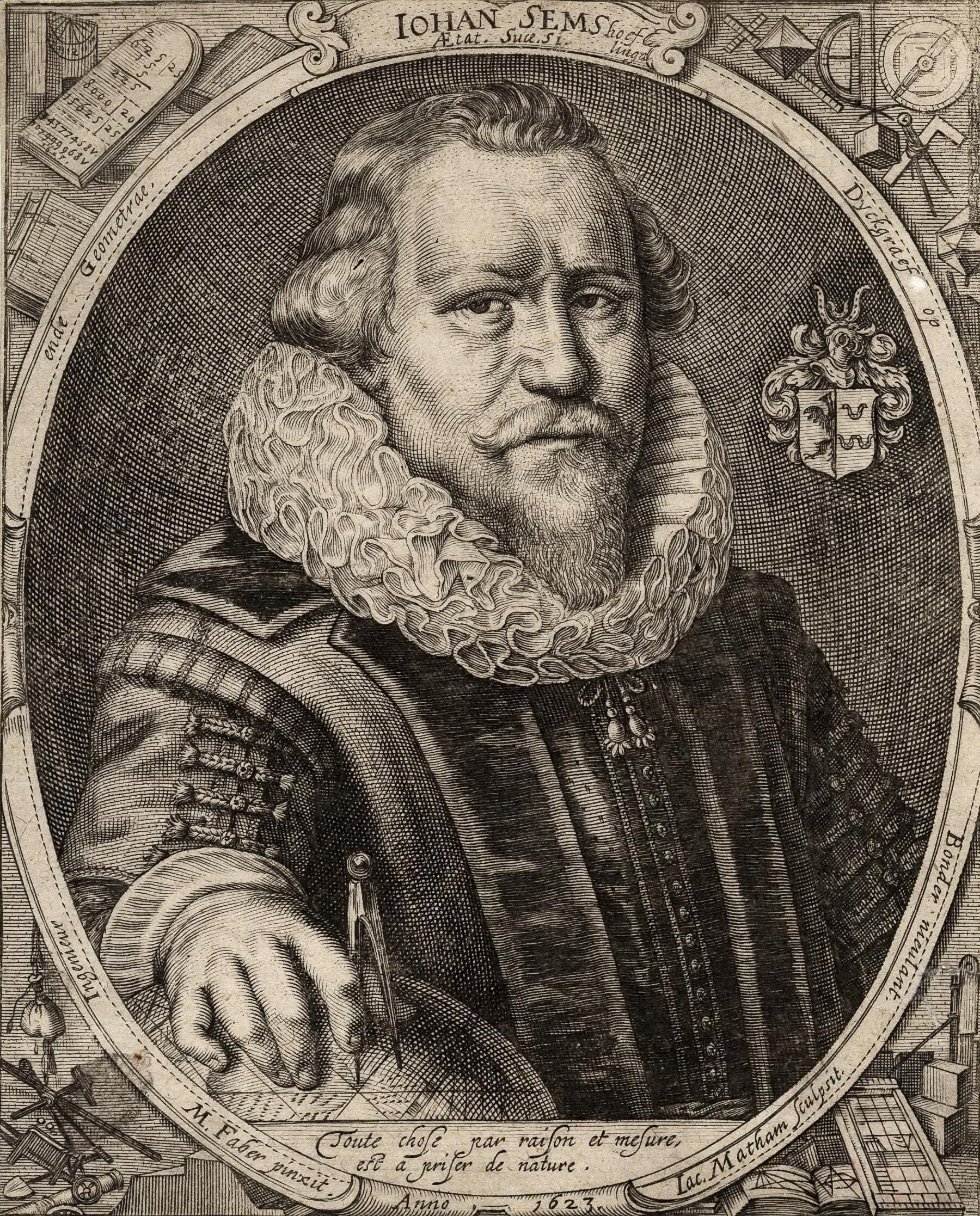
Johan Sems, 1623

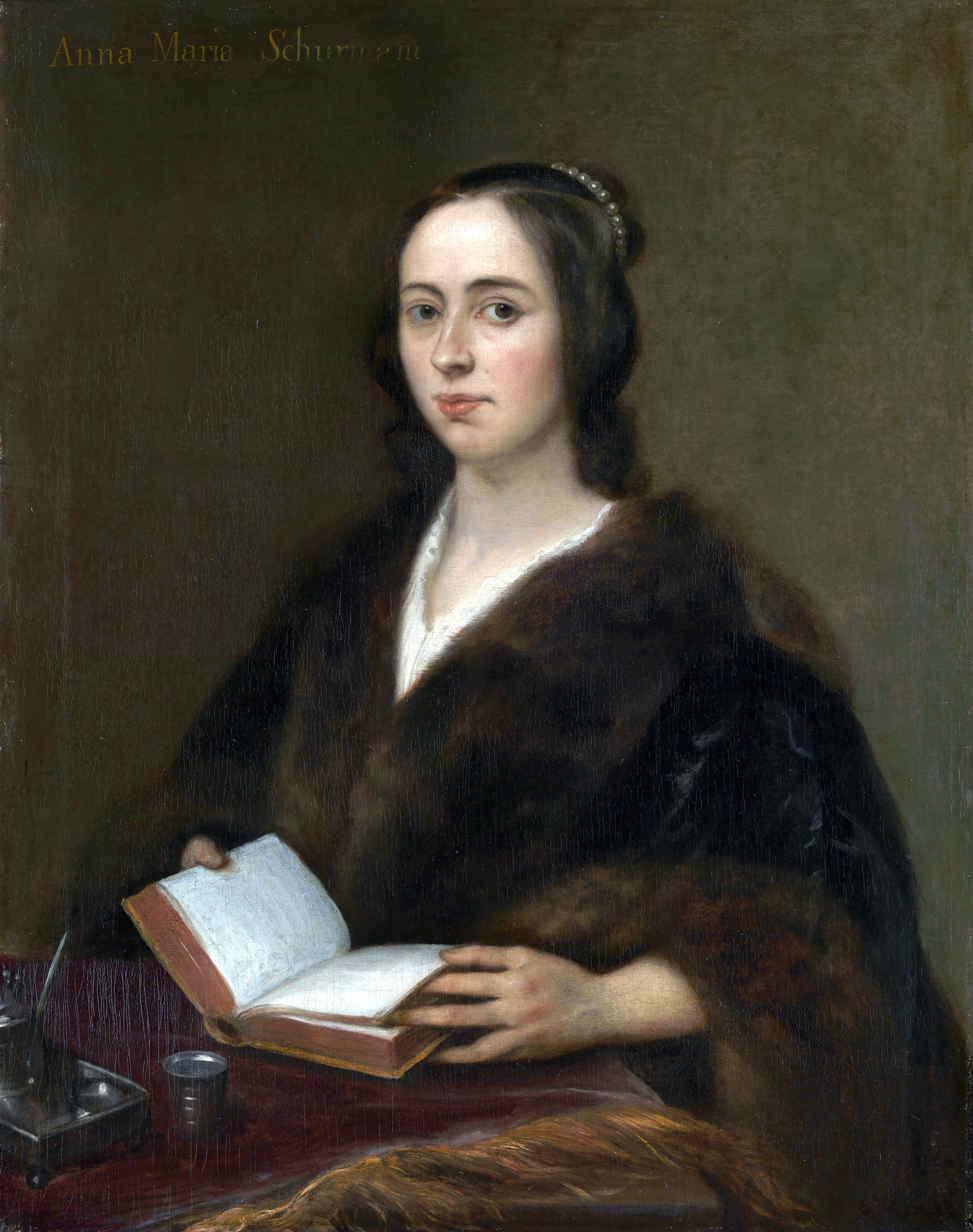
Anna Maria van Schurman, 1649

=== Academic & public service ===
- Sixtinus Amama (1593 in Franeker – 1629) a Dutch Reformed theologian and orientalist
- Tjerk Hiddes de Vries (1622 in Sexbierum – 1666) a Dutch admiral
- Sicco van Goslinga (1664 in Herbaijum – 1731) a Dutch statesman and diplomat
- François Hemsterhuis (1721 in Franeker – 1790) a writer on aesthetics and moral philosophy
- Johan Valckenaer (1759 in Franeker – 1821) a Dutch lawyer, patriot and diplomat.
- Michael Jan de Goeje (1836 in Dronryp – 1909), a Dutch orientalist focusing on Arabia and Islam
- Dirk Boonstra (1893 in Sint Annaparochie – 1944) a police commander and World War II hero
- Jelle Zijlstra (1918 in Oosterbierum – 2001), politician, Prime Minister of the Netherlands 1966/1967
- Jacob Klapwijk (1933 in Dronryp – 2021) a Dutch philosopher and academic
- Aucke van der Werff (born 1953) a Dutch politician, Mayor of het Bildt, 2003/2010
- Pia Dijkstra (born 1954 in Franeker) a Dutch politician and former TV news presenter

=== Science ===
- Johan Sems (1572 in Franeker – 1635) a Dutch cartographer, engineer and land surveyor
- Eise Eisinga (1744 in Dronryp – 1828) an amateur astronomer
- Adolphus Ypey (1749 in Franeker – 1822) a Dutch botanist
- Sebald Justinus Brugmans (1763 in Franeker – 1819), botanist and physician
- Jan Oort (1900 in Franeker – 1992) a Dutch astronomer of the Milky Way
- Rein Strikwerda (1930 in Franeker – 2006) a Dutch orthopedic surgeon of footballers
- Johan Bouma (born 1940 in Vrouwenparochie) a Dutch soil scientist

=== Arts ===
- Jacobus Mancadan (ca.1602 in Minnertsga – 1680) a Dutch Golden Age painter of pastoral landscapes
- Anna Maria van Schurman (1607–1678), painter, engraver and poet
- Jan Jansz. de Stomme (1615 in Franeker – 1658) a Dutch Golden Age portrait painter
- Lawrence Alma-Tadema (1836 in Dronryp – 1912), painter

=== Sport ===
- Sippie Tigchelaar (born 1952 in Franeker) a retired speed skater, competed at the 1972 Winter Olympics
- Tjalling van den Bosch (born 1958 in Achlum) a powerlifter, strongman, and Highland Games athlete
- Petronella de Jong (born 1970 in Sint Jacobiparochie) a sailor, competed at the 2004 Summer Olympics
