= Boer, Netherlands =

Boer
- Village
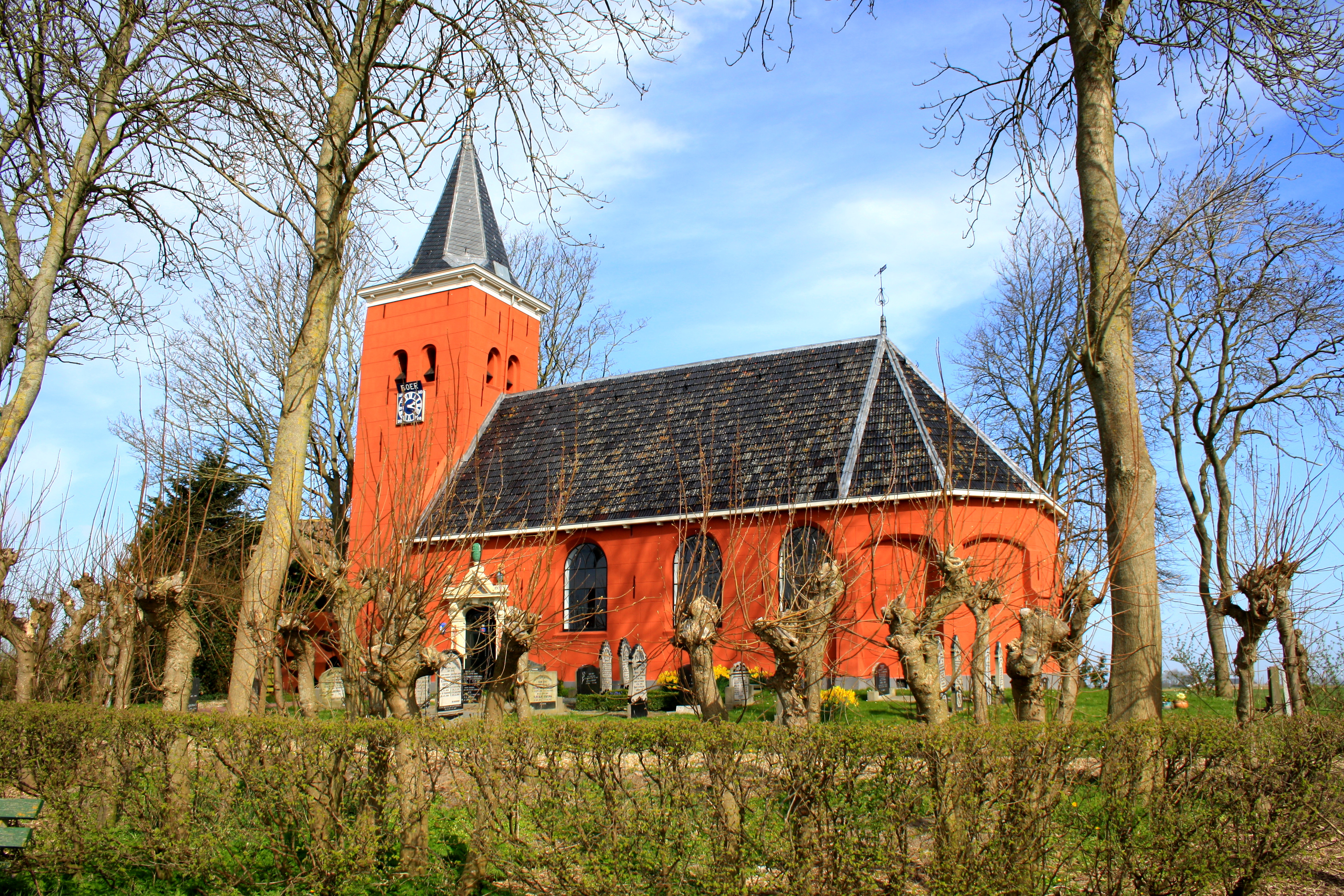
- St Mary's church

- Coat of arms

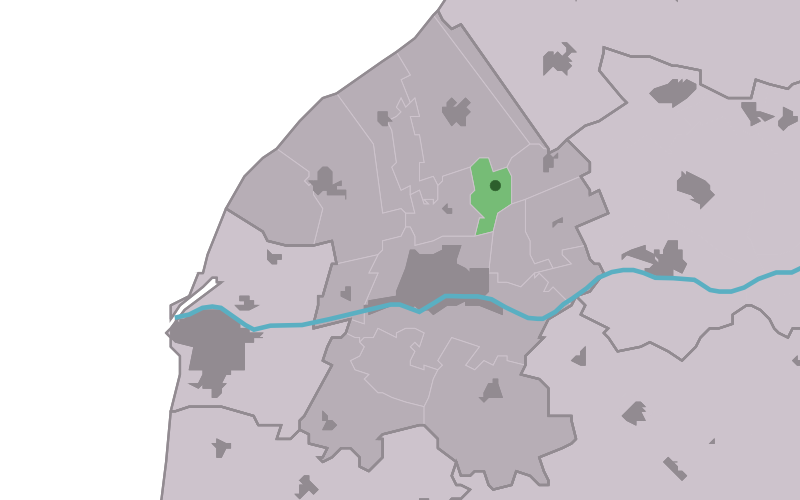
- Location in the Franekeradeel municipality

- Location in the Netherlands Boer (Netherlands)
- Country: Netherlands
- Province: Friesland
- Municipality: Waadhoeke

Area
  - Total: 2.11 km^{2} (0.81 sq mi)
- Elevation: 0.3 m (0.98 ft)

Population (2021)
  - Total: 45
  - Density: 21/km^{2} (55/sq mi)
- Time zone: UTC+1 (CET)
  - Summer (DST): UTC+2 (CEST)
- Postal code: 8806
- Dialing code: 0517

Boer is a small village in Waadhoeke in the province of Friesland, the Netherlands. It had a population of around 48 in 2014. Before 2018, the village was part of the Franekeradeel municipality.

The village was first mentioned in 1402 as Burstera Rede, and means "farm house". The Dutch Reformed church was built around 1500 and as pigeon holes. The church does not look that old, because a layer of plaster had been applied to hide the somewhat ruinous stones.

Boer was home to 93 people in 1840.

== Gallery ==
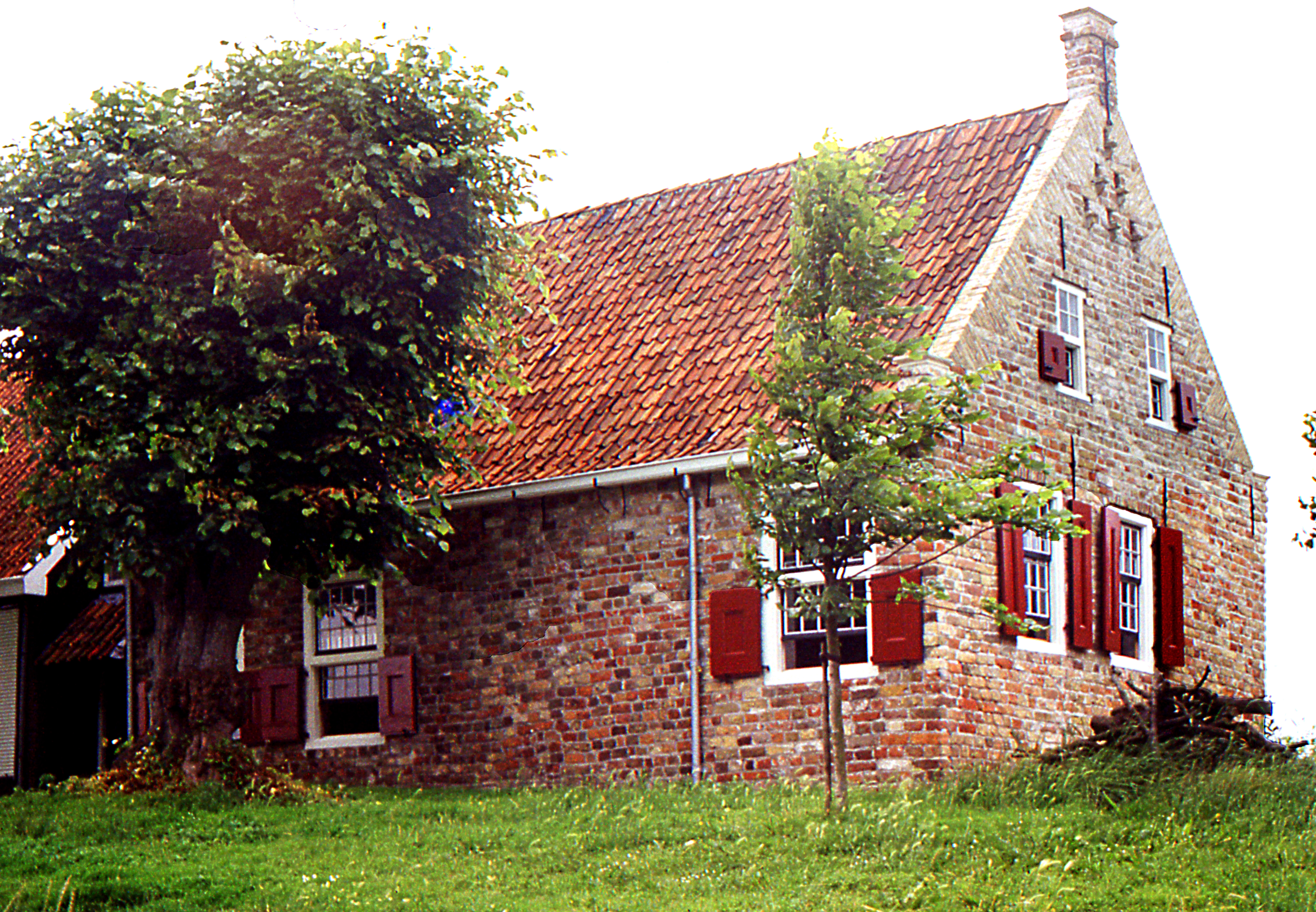
Clergy house in Boer

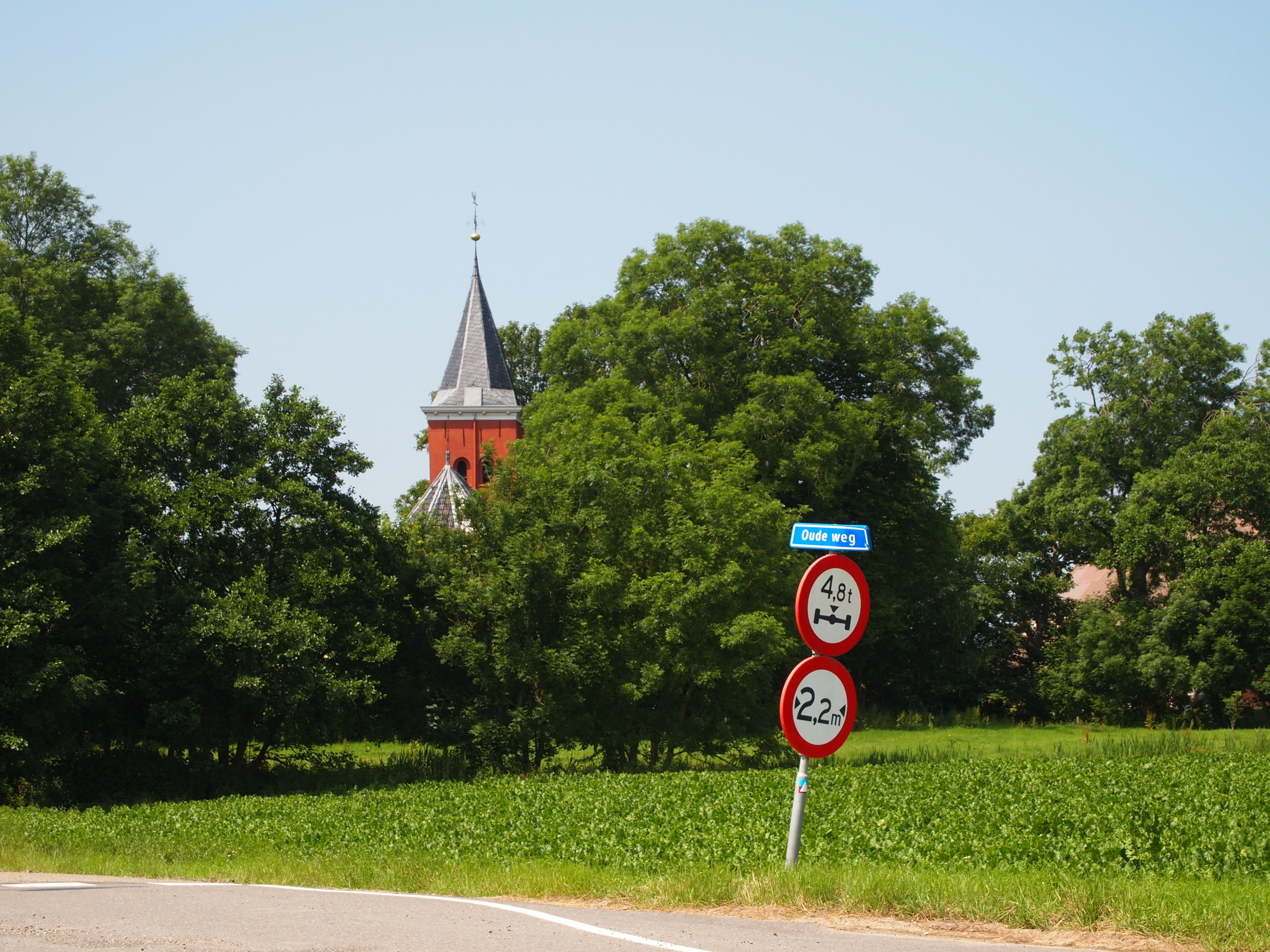
Boer behind the trees
