= Peins =

- Village
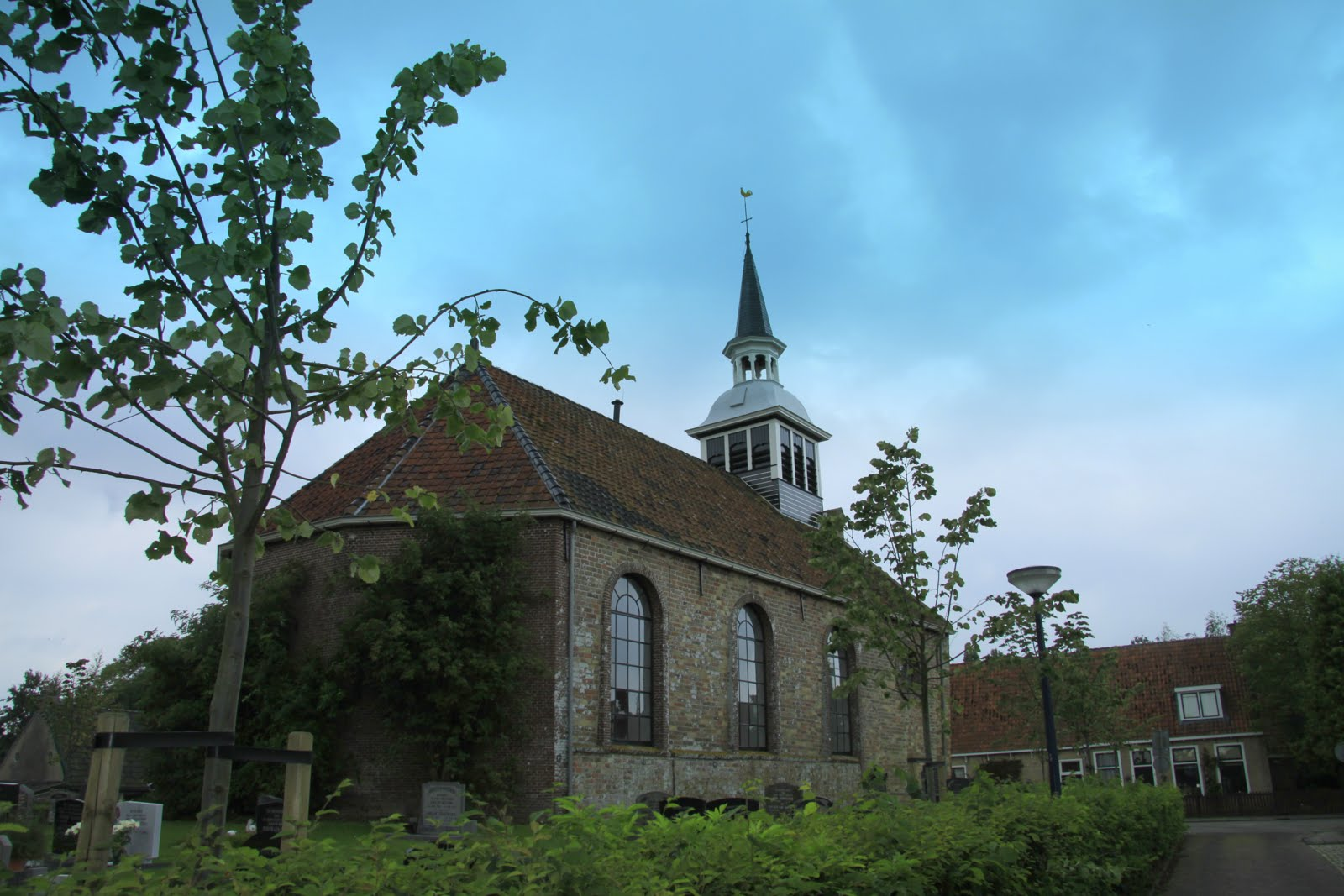
- St Gertrude's church

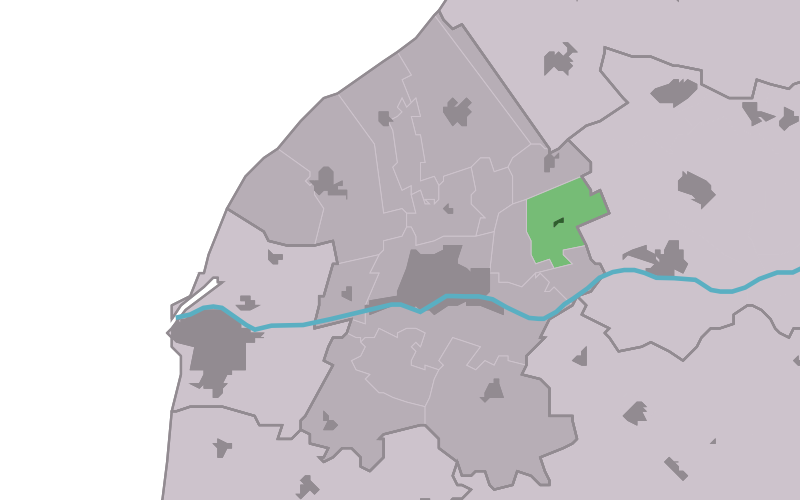
- Location in the Franekeradeel municipality

- Location in the Netherlands Peins (Netherlands)
- Country: Netherlands
- Province: Friesland
- Municipality: Waadhoeke

Area
  - Total: 4.06 km^{2} (1.57 sq mi)
- Elevation: 0.3 m (0.98 ft)

Population (2021)
  - Total: 260
  - Density: 64/km^{2} (170/sq mi)
- Time zone: UTC+1 (CET)
  - Summer (DST): UTC+2 (CEST)
- Postal code: 8812
- Dialing code: 0517

Peins is a village in Waadhoeke in the province of Friesland, the Netherlands. It had a population of around 170 in January 2018. Up to 2018, the village was part of the Franekeradeel municipality.

== History ==
The village was first mentioned in the 13th century Pesinghe, and its name means "settlement of the people of Pese (person)". Peins is a terp (artificial living hill) which probably dates from the beginning of our era. The clay wall to Franeker which later turned into a road. The Dutch Reformed church dates from around 1300 and was extensively modified in 1865. The tower was replaced in 1912.

Peins was home to 168 people in 1840.

== Gallery ==
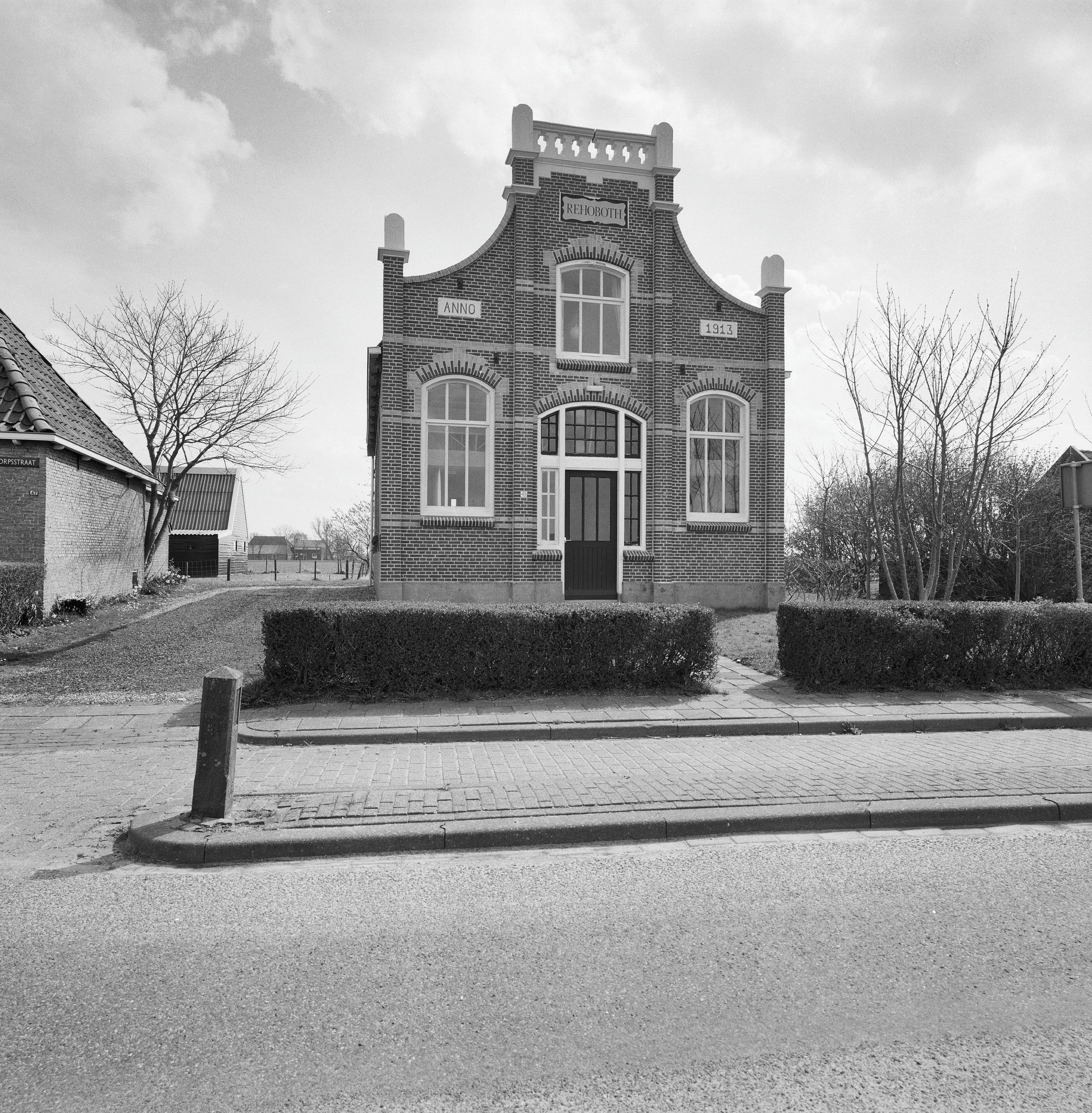
House in Peins
