= Arkens =

Arkens Erkens (West Frisian)
- Hamlet
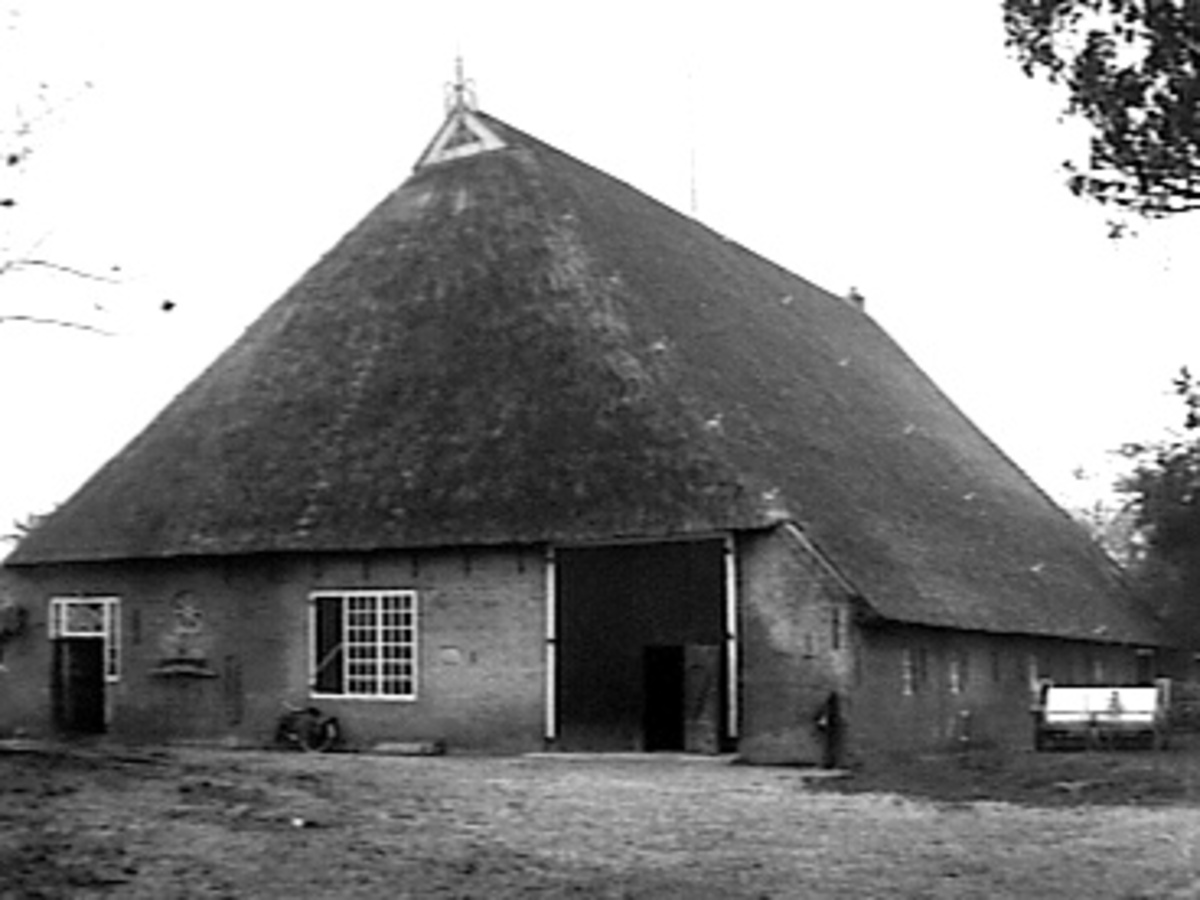
- Old farmhouse in Arkens

- Location in the province of Friesland in the Netherlands Arkens (Netherlands)
- Coordinates: 53.19341°N 5.55319°E
- Country: Netherlands
- Province: Friesland
- Municipality: Waadhoeke
- City: Franeker
- Elevation: 0.6 m (2.0 ft)

Population
  - Total: c. 15
- Time zone: UTC+1 (CET)
  - Summer (DST): UTC+2 (CEST)
- Postcode: 8802
- Area code: 0517

Arkens (Dutch pronunciation: [ˈɑr.kəns]; West Frisian: Erkens) is a hamlet in the Dutch municipality of Waadhoeke in the province of Friesland. It is located southwest of Schalsum and on the direct northeast side of Franeker, of which it is a part administratively.

The habitation consists of several farms on a road of the same name. Due to the expansions of Franeker, Arkens is located on the edge of the built-up area of Franeker, it is sometimes seen as part of that city itself. Near the hamlet is Arkens, an eponymous windmill which is currently located within the built-up area of Franeker – it was moved to there in 1972.

== Name ==
Arkens was mentioned as Erdenze in 1433. Possibly a spelling error as it is mentioned as Erckens in 1499. Such a shift in a short time is not really common. The place name is also said have derived from a compound of Arke, a personal name, and the suffix -ingi which developed into the Frisian -ens. In 1543 the place was mentioned as Arckens. Until 2018, Arkens belonged to the municipality of Franekeradeel.
