= Bonkwert =

Bonkwert Bonkwerd (Dutch)
- Hamlet
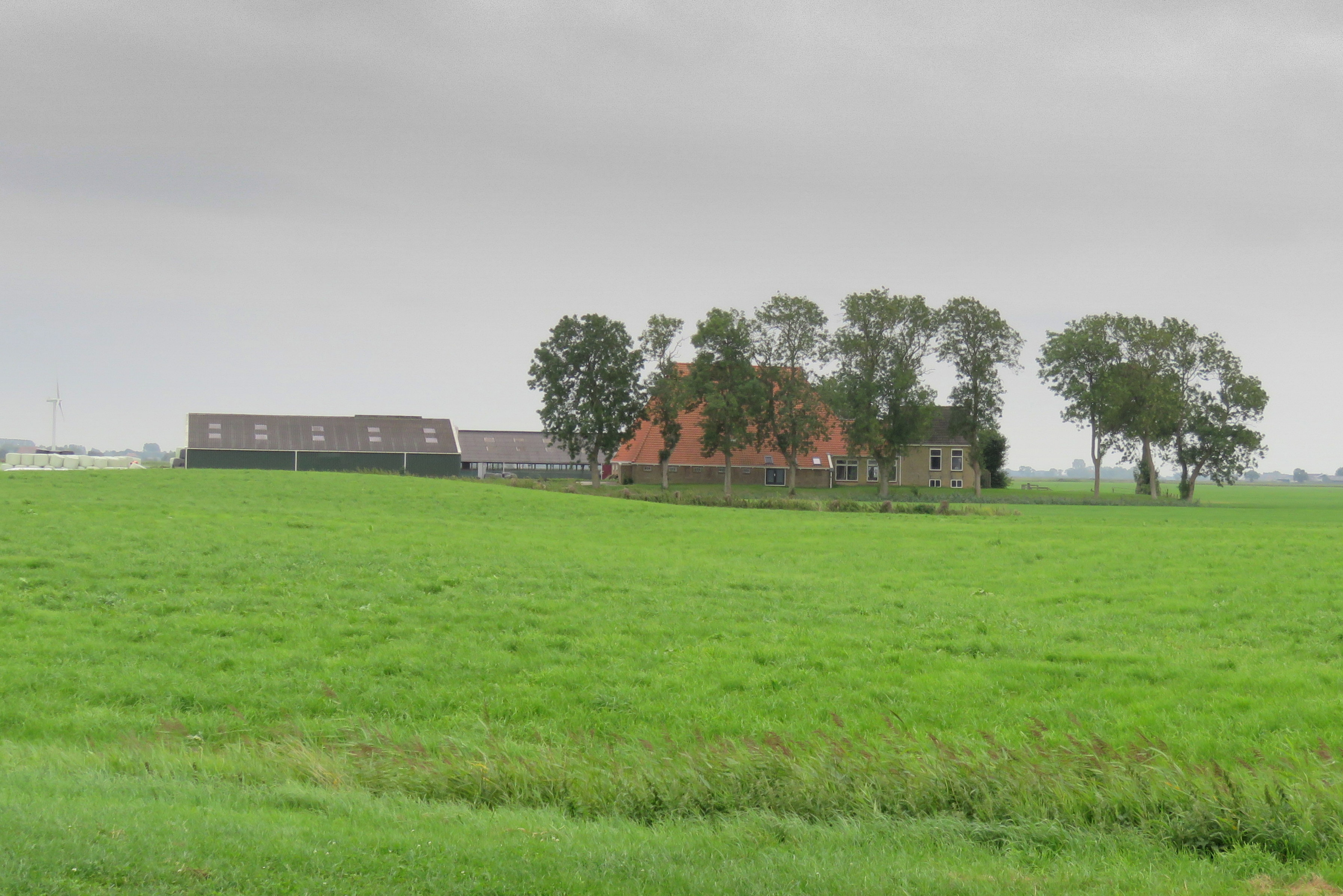
- View of a farm in Bonkwert

- Location in the province of Friesland in the Netherlands Bonkwert (Netherlands)
- Coordinates: 53.13254°N 5.60649°E
- Country: Netherlands
- Province: Friesland
- Municipality: Waadhoeke
- Village: Spannum
- Elevation: 0.3 m (0.98 ft)

Population
  - Total: c. 10
- Time zone: UTC+1 (CET)
  - Summer (DST): UTC+2 (CEST)
- Postcode: 8843
- Area code: 0517

Bonkwert (Dutch: Bonkwerd [ˈbɔŋkʋərt]) is hamlet in the Dutch municipality of Waadhoeke in the province of Friesland. It is located northeast of Wommels, north of Iens and southwest of the village of Spannum, of which it is part administratively.

The habitation is located north of the N359 and consists of several scattered farms on the dead-end road Bonkwerterreed. This road can only be accessed by crossing a cattle grid. It is also the place where the place name sign is located.

The hamlet was first mentioned as Buurckwert in 1487. This is probably a misspelling of Buunckwert because in 1530 it was written as Buynckwert and in 1532 as Bunckwert. The suffix -werd refers to a terp ('werd' or 'wierde'). This mound was already inhabited in the late Iron Age (around 250 BC). It is unknown what Bonk or Buunck refers to. It may refer to the personal name 'Bonika'; "the little warrior who can kill", or to 'Bonninga', a Frisian surname.

Currently located in the municipality of Waadhoeke, Bonkwert belonged to Littenseradiel until 2018, and Hennaarderadeel until 1984. Having been part of Littenseradiel, the hamlet's official name is in West Frisian, as opposed to the Dutch variant which ends on -d.
