= Bitgummole =

Bitgummole Beetgumermolen
- Village
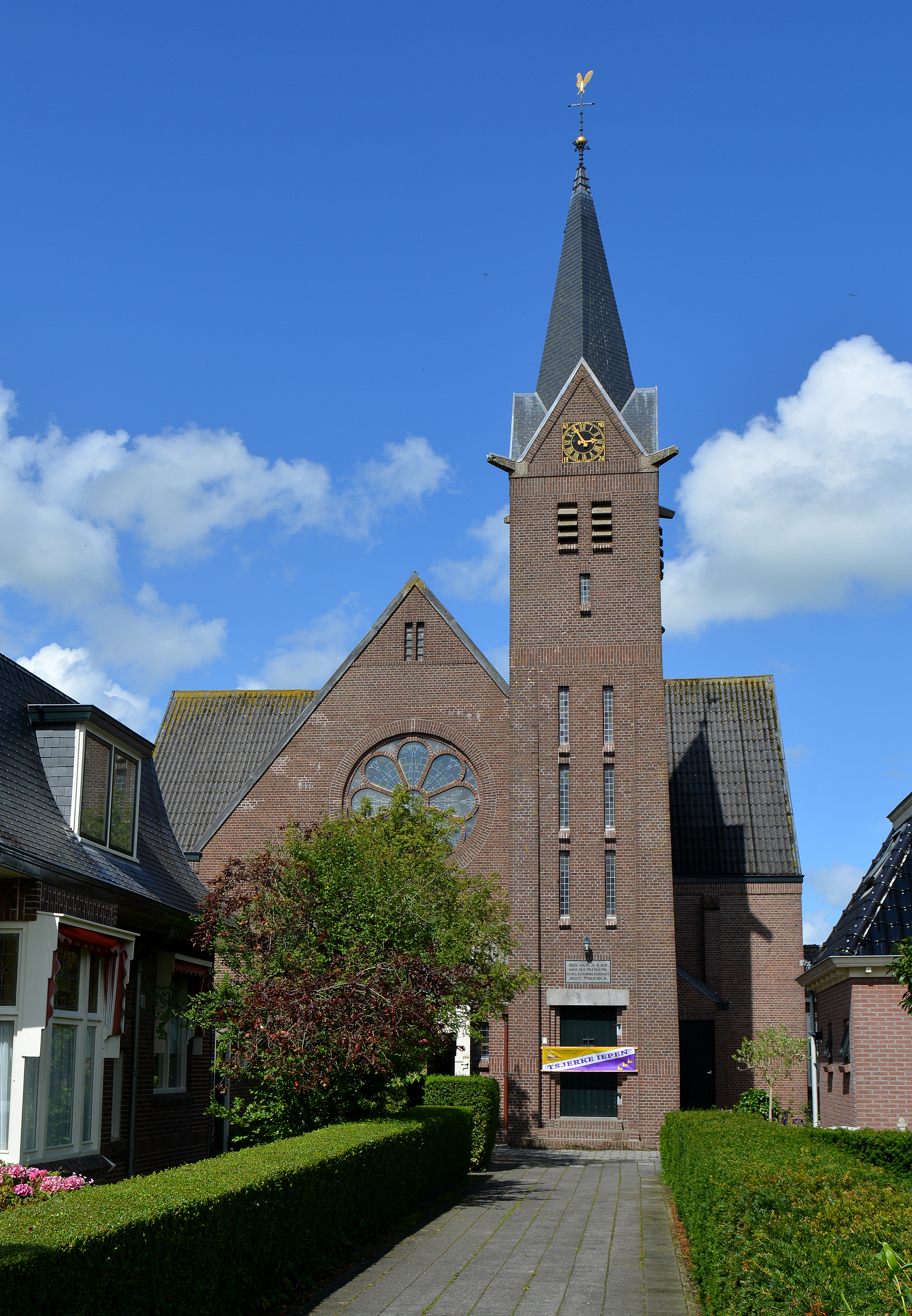
- Bitgummole church

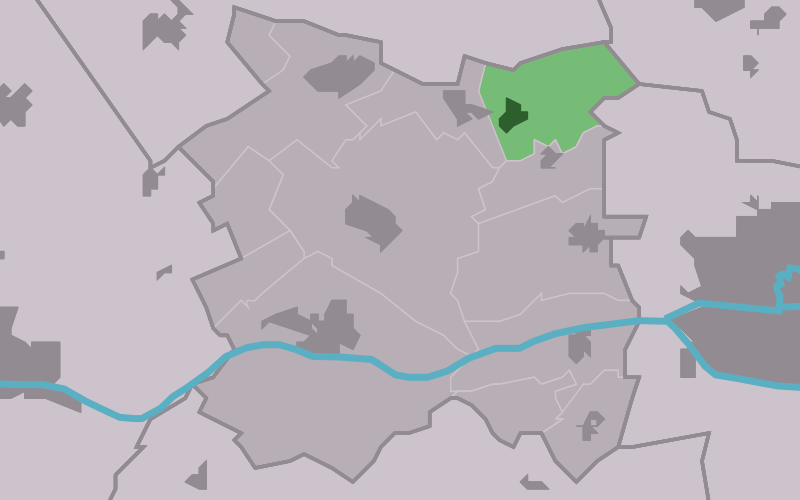
- Location in Menameradiel municipality

- Location in the Netherlands Bitgummole (Netherlands)
- Country: Netherlands
- Province: Friesland
- Municipality: Waadhoeke

Area
  - Total: 5.11 km^{2} (1.97 sq mi)
- Elevation: 1.3 m (4.3 ft)

Population (2021)
  - Total: 910
  - Density: 180/km^{2} (460/sq mi)
- Time zone: UTC+1 (CET)
  - Summer (DST): UTC+2 (CEST)
- Postal code: 9045
- Dialing code: 058

Bitgummole (Dutch: Beetgumermolen) is a village in Waadhoeke municipality in the province of Friesland, the Netherlands. It had a population of around 911 in January 2017. Before 2018, the village was part of the Menameradiel municipality.

== History ==
The village was first mentioned in 1622 as Beetgumer Meulen, and means "wind mill of Beetgum". The mill was a grist mill for rye which has been known to exist on the dike since the 16th century. Bitgummole was built on a dike from around 1300. It started to develop during the 18th and 19th century. A church was built in 1924.

Bitgummole was home to 494 people in 1840. The wind mill burnt down in 1862, and was never rebuilt. In 1963, it was awarded village status.
