= Hitzum =

Hitzum Hitsum
- Village
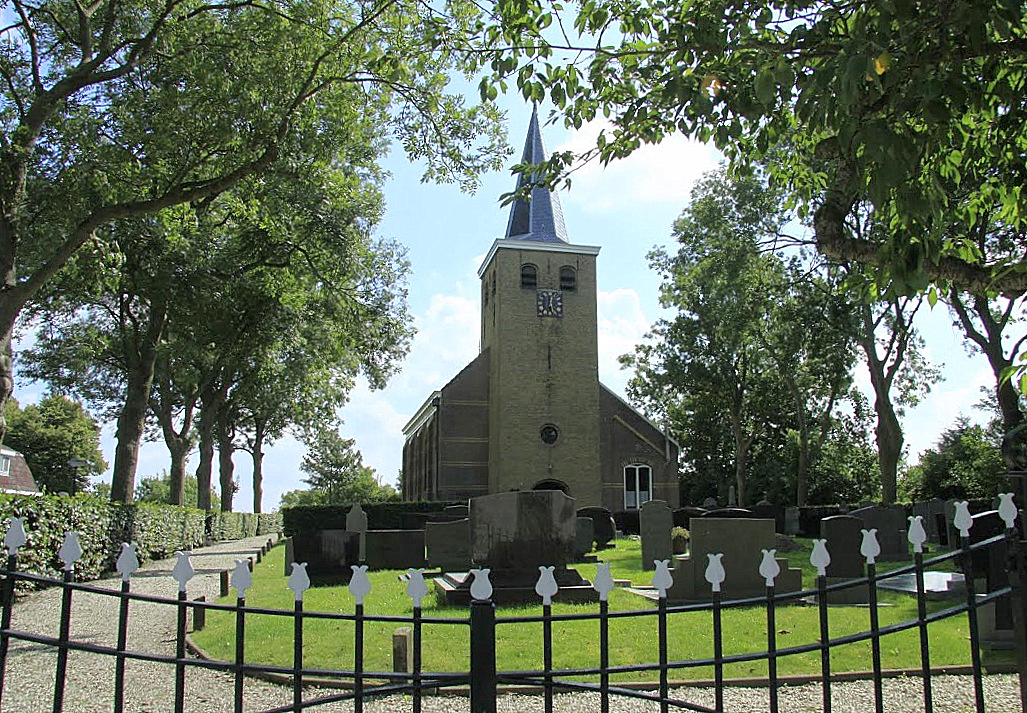
- Hitzum church

- Flag Coat of arms

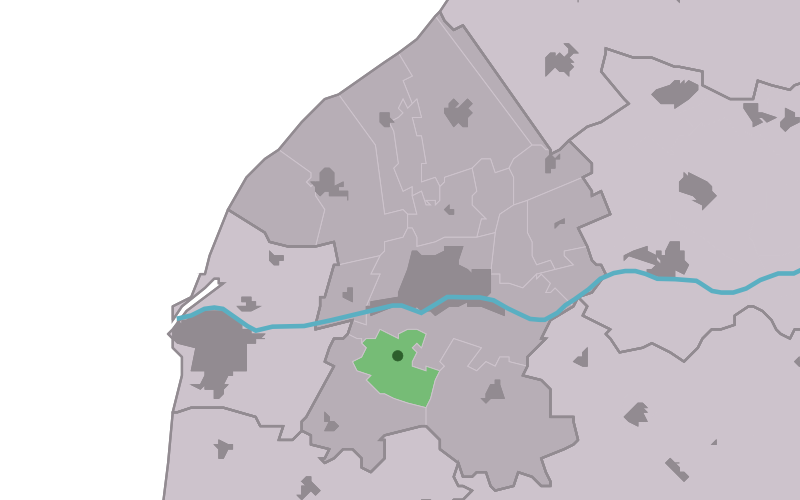
- Location in the Franekeradeel municipality

- Location in the Netherlands Hitzum (Netherlands)
- Country: Netherlands
- Province: Friesland
- Municipality: Waadhoeke

Area
  - Total: 4.29 km^{2} (1.66 sq mi)
- Elevation: 0.1 m (0.33 ft)

Population (2021)
  - Total: 225
  - Density: 52.4/km^{2} (136/sq mi)
- Time zone: UTC+1 (CET)
  - Summer (DST): UTC+2 (CEST)
- Postal code: 8805
- Dialing code: 0517

Hitzum (West Frisian: Hitsum) is a village in Waadhoeke municipality in the province of Friesland, the Netherlands. It had a population of around 225 in January 2014. Before 2018, the village was part of the Franekeradeel municipality.

The village was first mentioned in the 13th century as Hitsem, and means "settlement of the people of Hitse (person)". Hitzum is a terp (artificial living hill) village. Archaeological artefacts have been discovered in the village from the 6th century. The van Burmania family originated from Hitzum. The Dutch Reformed church dates from 1883.

Hitzum was home to 98 people in 1840. In 1971, a village house was built in Hitzum.

== Gallery ==
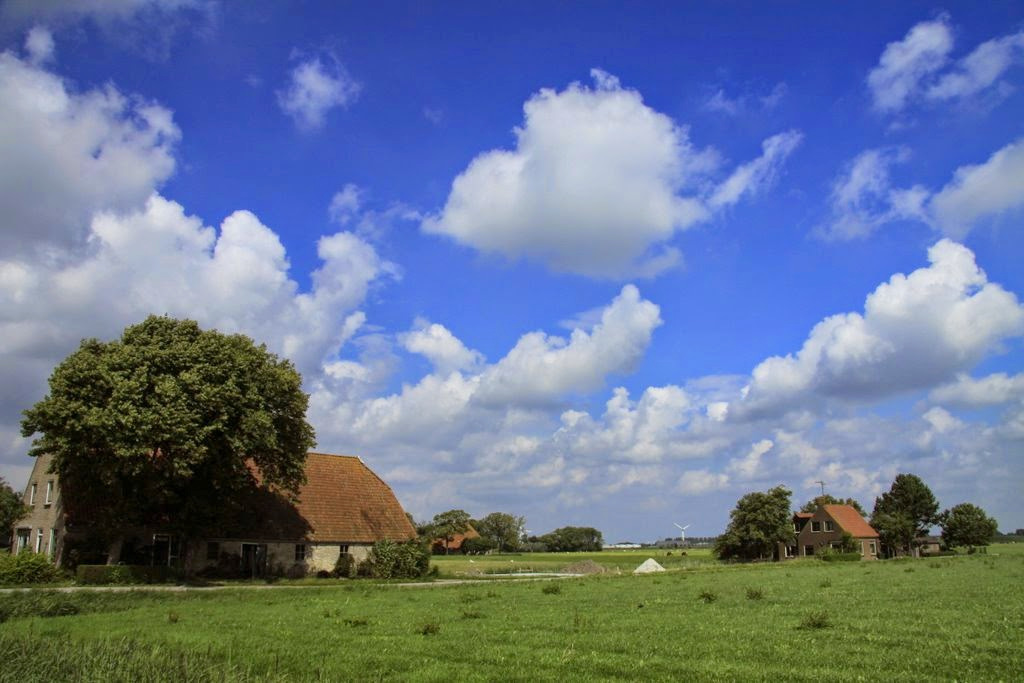
Landscape around Hitzum

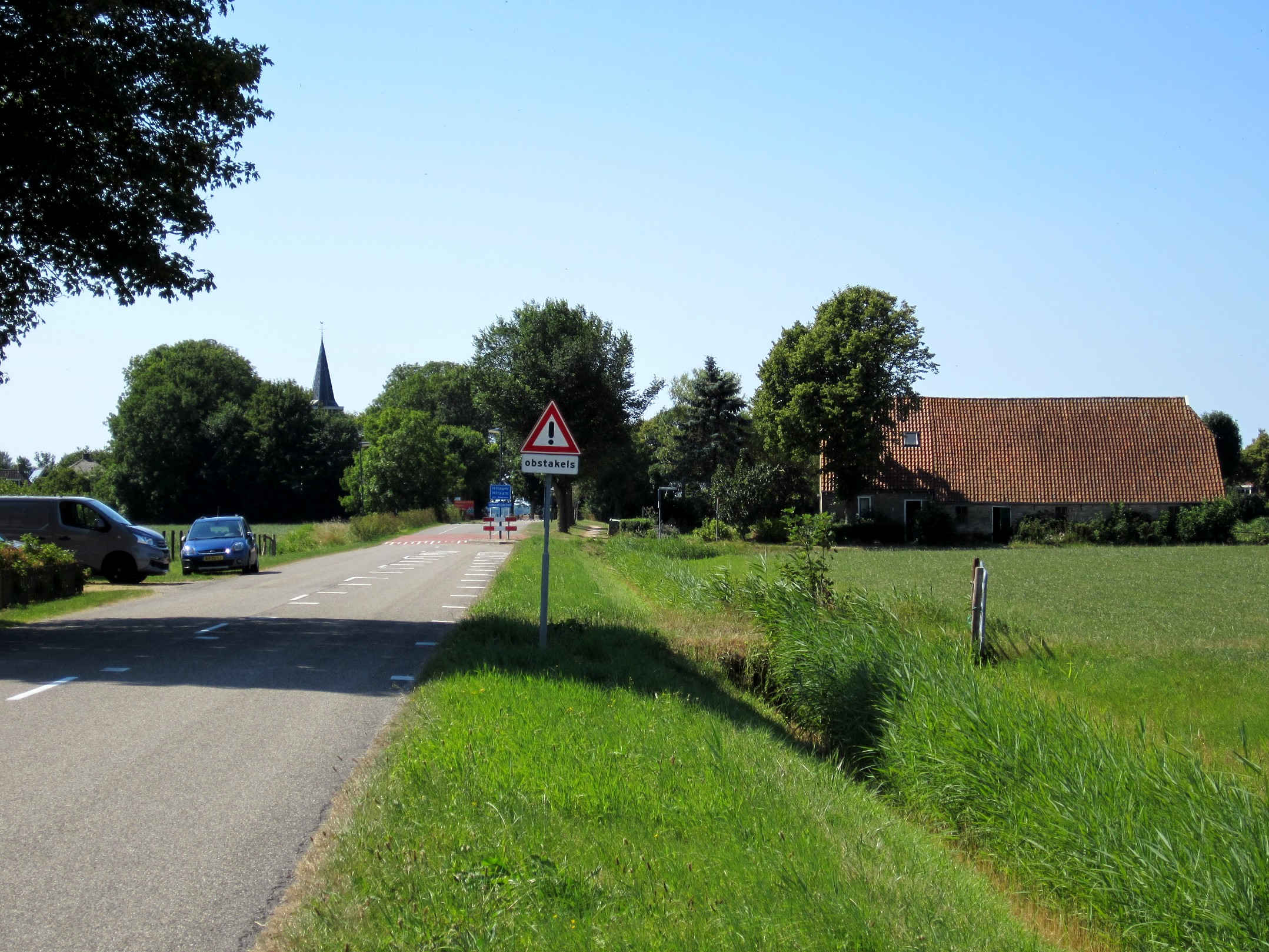
View on Hitzum

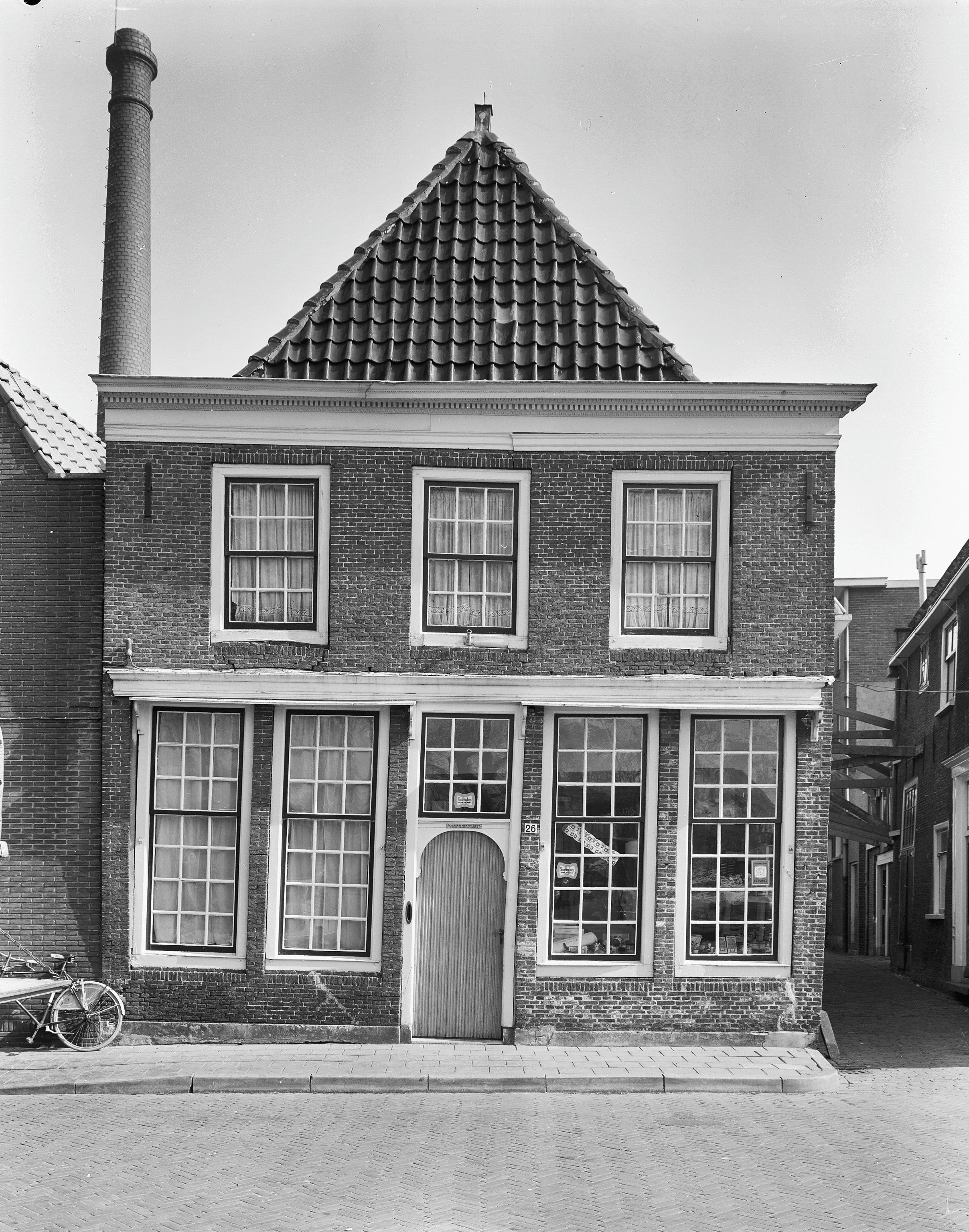
House in Hitzum (1968)
