= Ingelum =

Engelum Ingelum
- Village
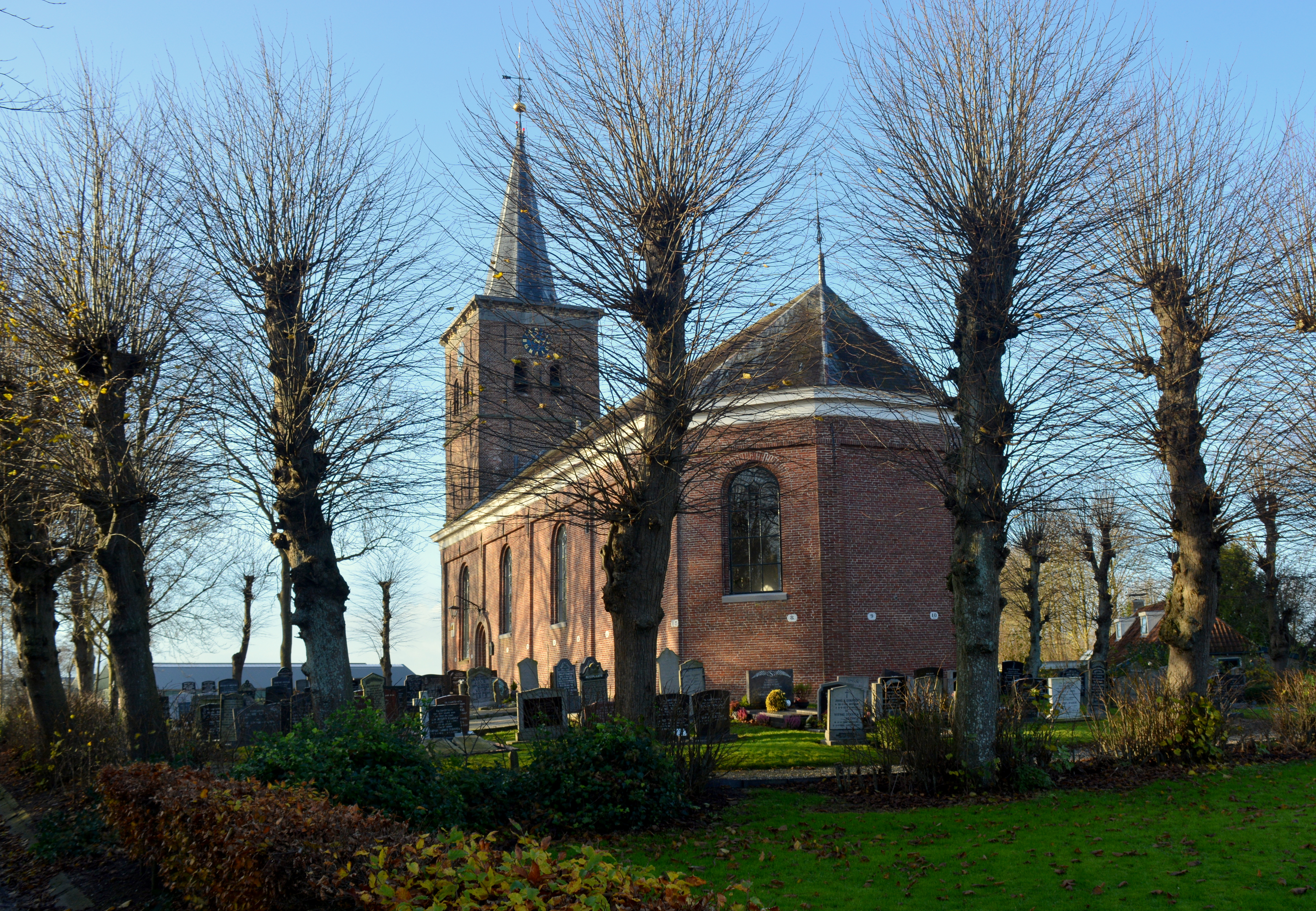
- Church of Engelum

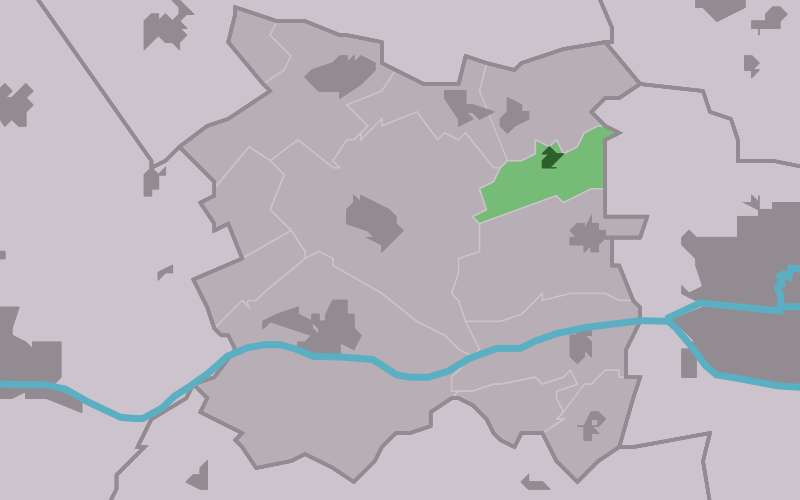
- Location in Menameradiel municipality

- Location in the Netherlands Engelum (Netherlands)
- Country: Netherlands
- Province: Friesland
- Municipality: Waadhoeke

Area
  - Total: 2.19 km^{2} (0.85 sq mi)
- Elevation: 1.3 m (4.3 ft)

Population (2021)
  - Total: 375
  - Density: 171/km^{2} (443/sq mi)
- Time zone: UTC+1 (CET)
  - Summer (DST): UTC+2 (CEST)
- Postal code: 9038
- Dialing code: 058

Ingelum (Dutch: Engelum) is a village in Waadhoeke in the province of Friesland, the Netherlands. It had a population of around 386 as of January 2017. Before 2018, the village was part of the municipality of Menameradiel.

== History ==
The village was first mentioned in 1319 as Enghelum, and the name may mean either "settlement of Engel (a personal name)" or "settlement of the Angles (as in England)". Ingelum is a terp (artificial living hill) village dating back to the beginning of the common era. It was located near the former Middelzee.

The stins Grovestins was located on the dike near Ingelum, and was built before 1446. In 1446, the estate was taken by the Schieringers. Frederik Sirtema van Grovestins fought against France in 1712. During his expedition, he destroyed 35 villages and 18 castles around Metz. The estate was demolished in 1757.

The Dutch Reformed church was built in 1773 as a replacement for its medieval predecessor. The church was destroyed in a fire in 1975, and rebuilt in 1980. The tower was restored in 2009.

Ingelum had a population of 247 in 1840. Since 1995, it has been the start and finish of the annual Eleven City Tractor Race. The race with old-timer tractors was first conceived in 1990, but ran into objections from the police who would not allow tractors racing on public streets.
