= Firdgum =

Firdgum Furdgum
- Village
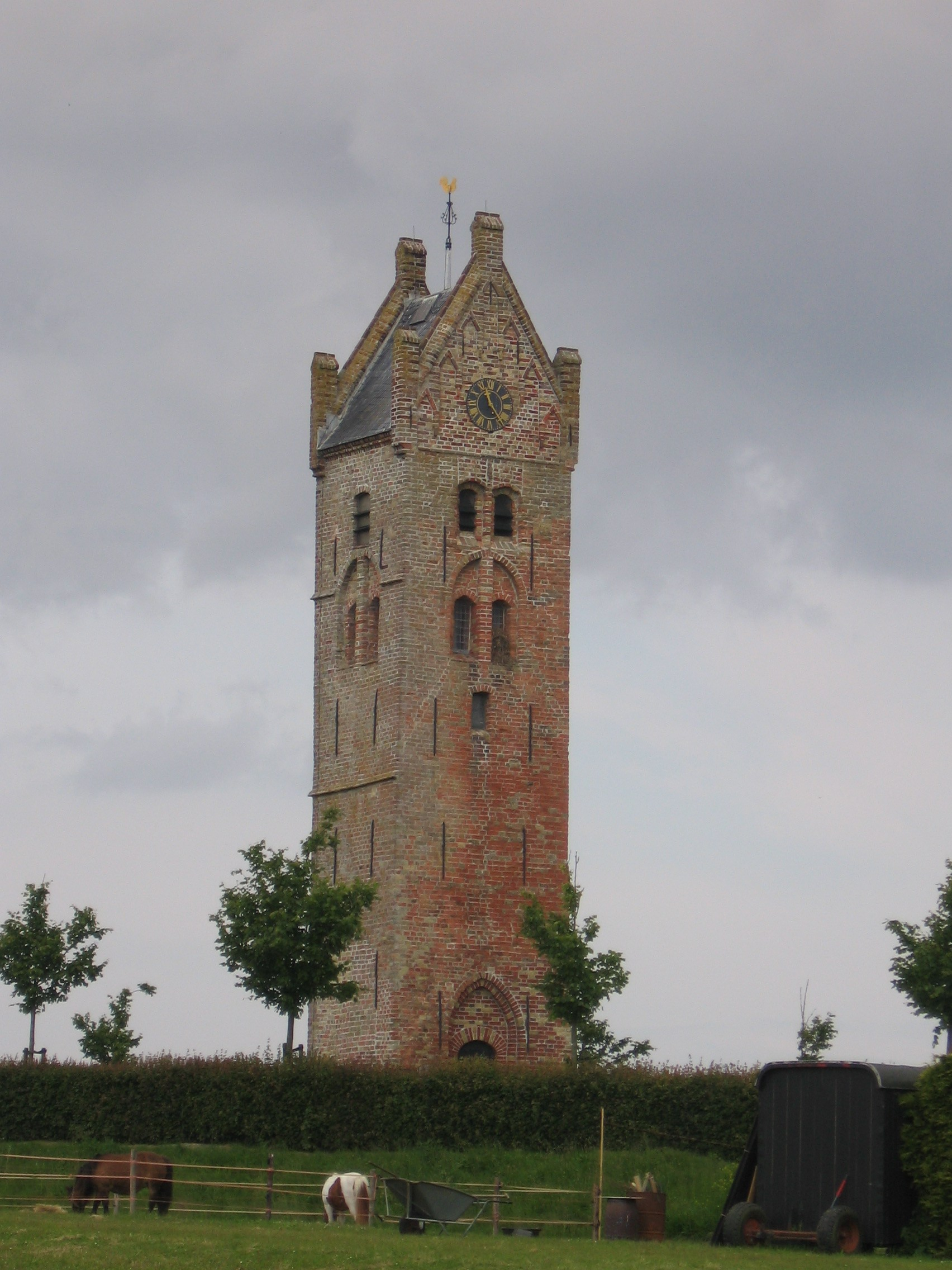
- Firdgum church tower

- Coat of arms

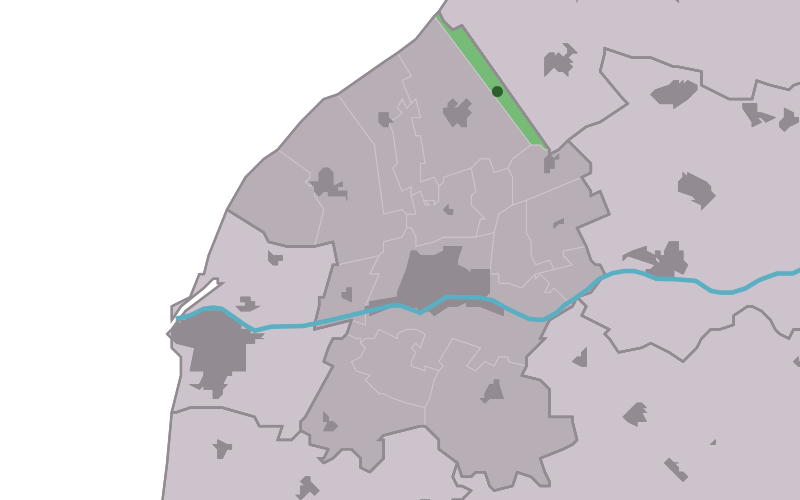
- Location in the Franekeradeel municipality

- Location in the Netherlands Firdgum (Netherlands)
- Country: Netherlands
- Province: Friesland
- Municipality: Waadhoeke

Area
  - Total: 2.45 km^{2} (0.95 sq mi)
- Elevation: 0.5 m (1.6 ft)

Population (2021)
  - Total: 70
  - Density: 29/km^{2} (74/sq mi)
- Time zone: UTC+1 (CET)
  - Summer (DST): UTC+2 (CEST)
- Postal code: 8852
- Dialing code: 0518

Firdgum (West Frisian: Furdgum) is a small village in Waadhoeke in the province of Friesland, the Netherlands. It had a population of around 60 in January 2014.

The Dutch reformed church of Firdgum was demolished in 1794 as it was in a state of disrepair, but the 13th-century church tower still remains to date. The tower houses a clock dating from 1471. In 1982, the tower was sold to the municipality for ƒ1,- and was restored between 1986 and 1987.

In the Yeb Hettingaskoalle (a cultural center in nearby Tzummarum), there is an archaeological support group with a collection of local finds and artefacts and varying expositions of modern artists.

== History ==
The village was first mentioned between 802 and 817 as in Fardincheim, and means "settlement of the people of Fardo (person)". Firdgum is a terp (artificial living hill) village and was located in the far north-eastern corner of Westergo until the het Bildt was poldered.

Firdgum was home to 94 people in 1840. Much of the terp was excavated around 1920. Until 2018, the village was part of the Franekeradeel municipality, and until 1984, it belonged to the Barradeel municipality.

== Gallery ==
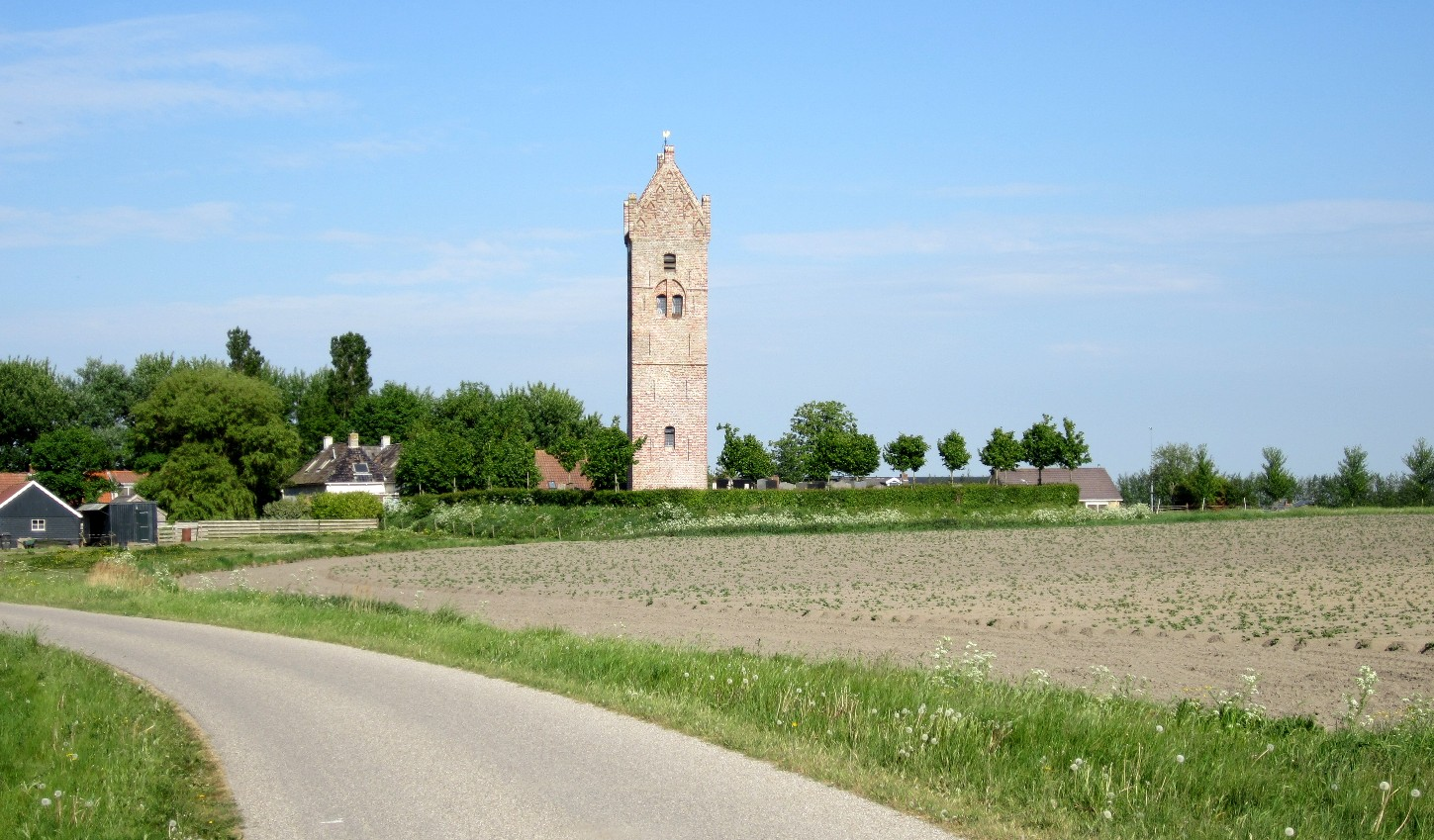
Village view

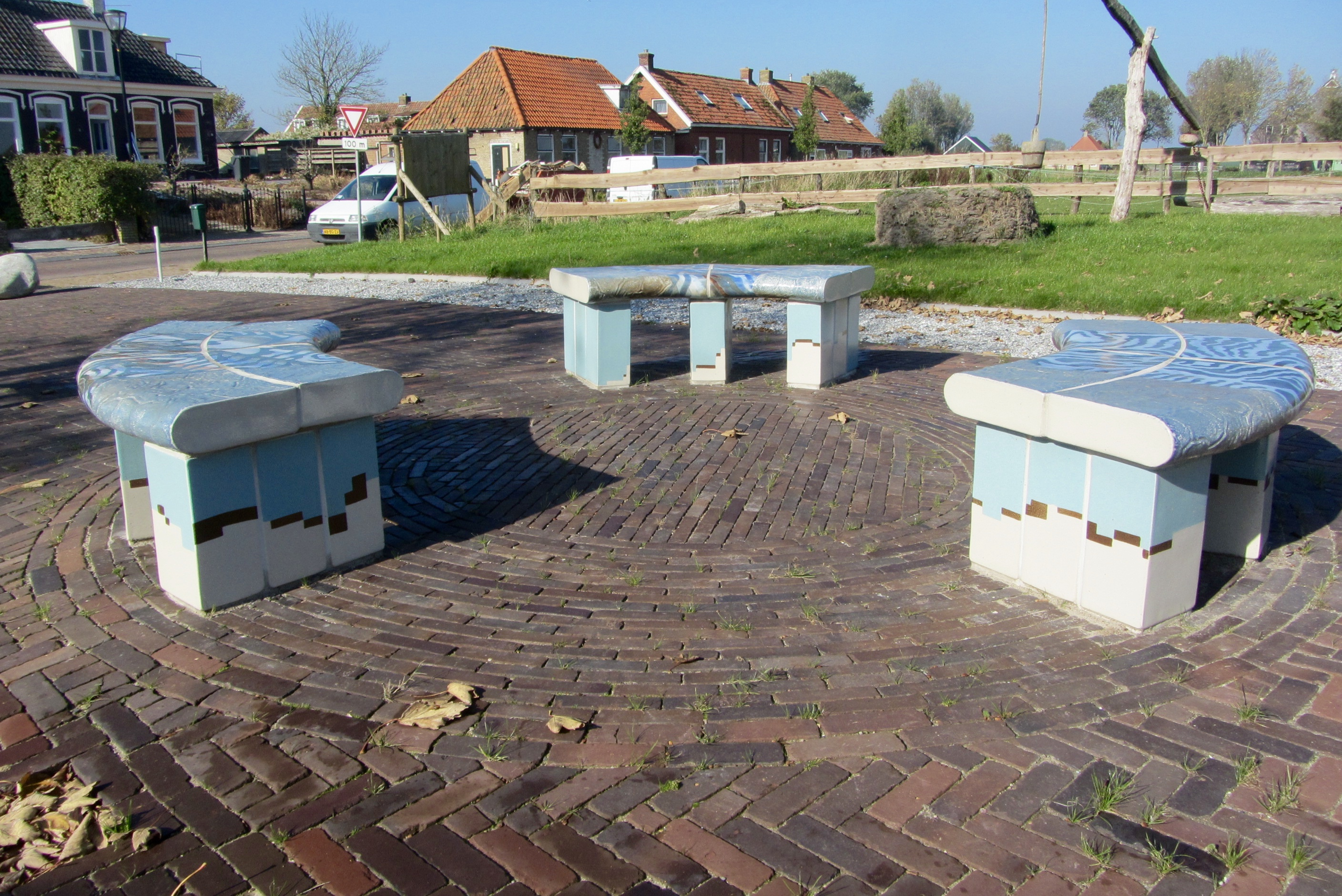
Village square

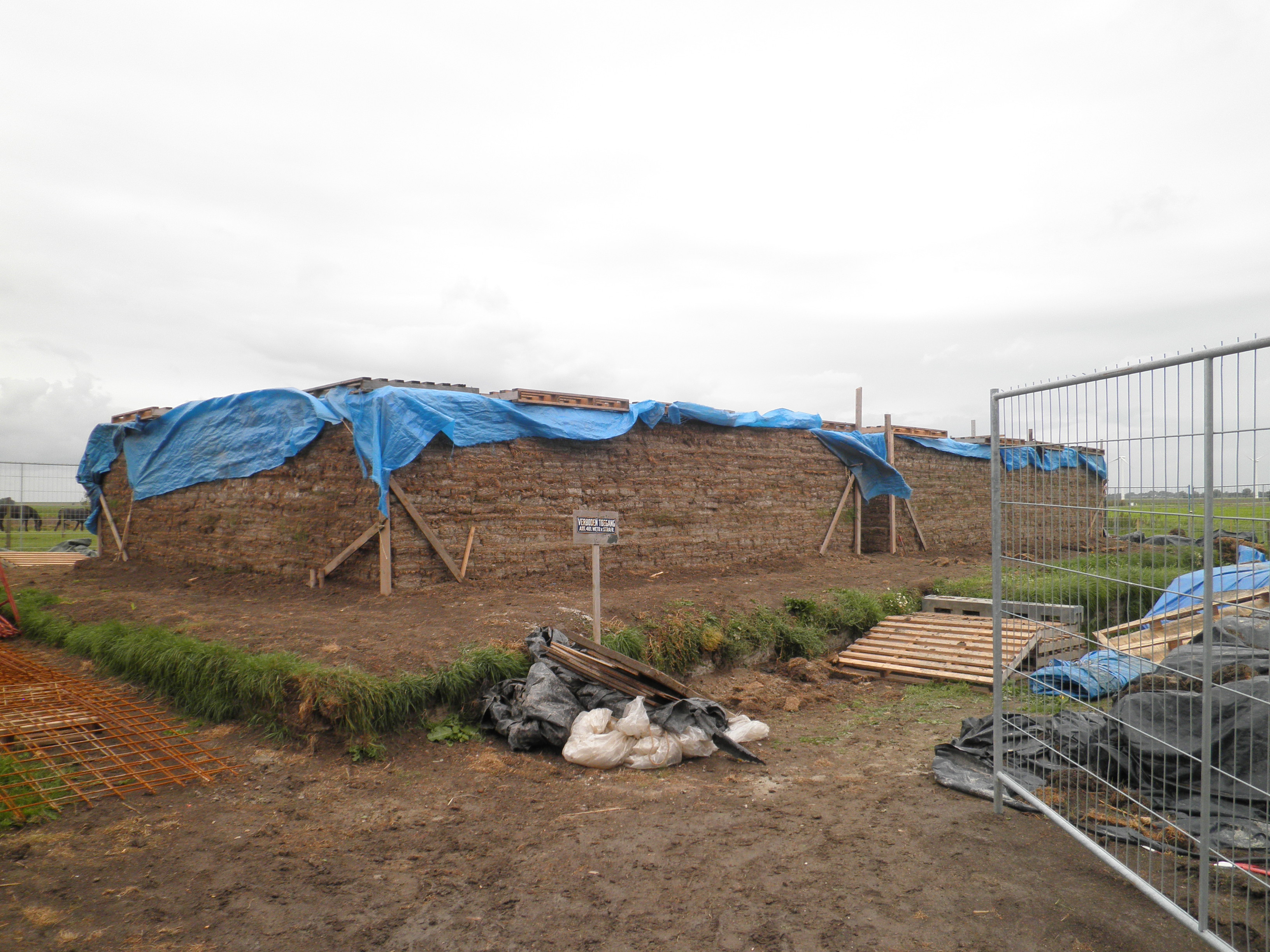
Sod house construction (second attempt)

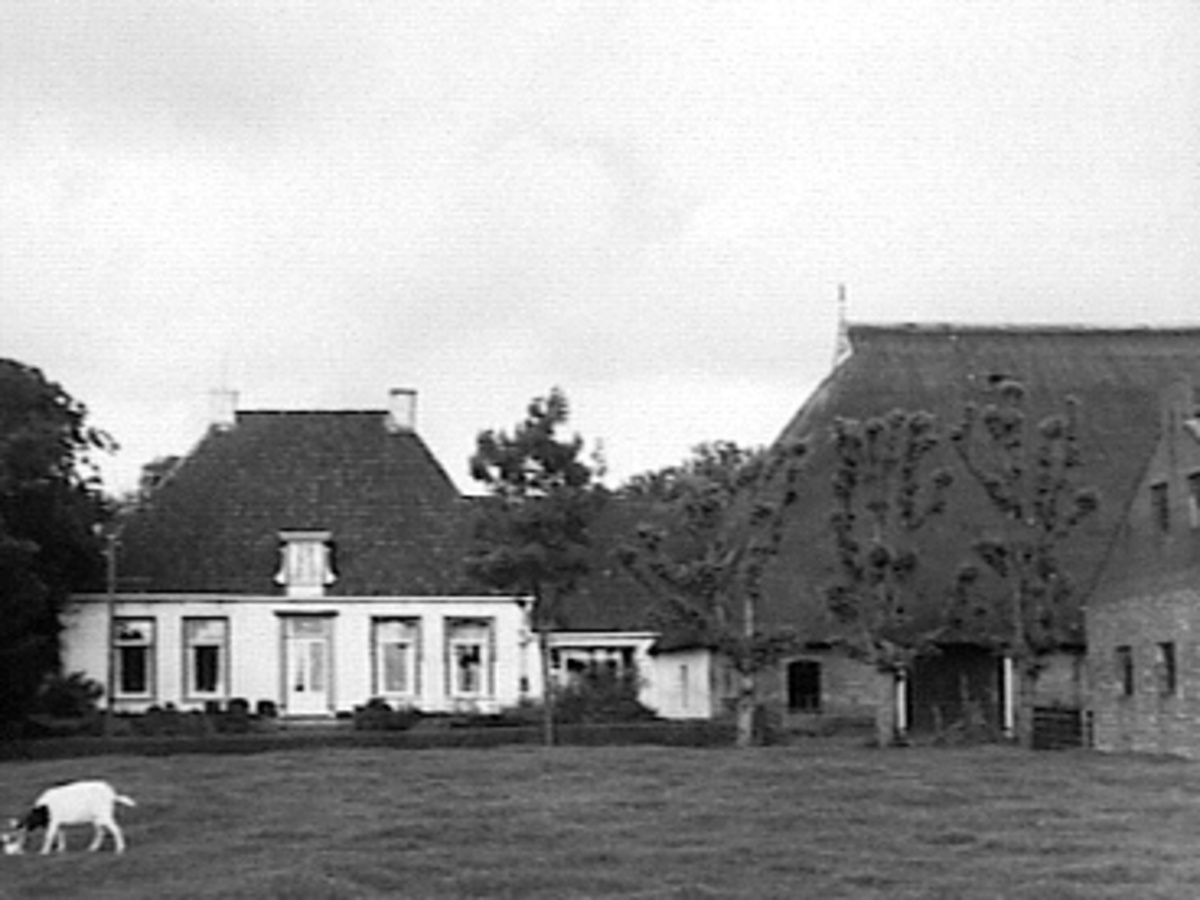
Farm in Firdgum
