= Klooster-Lidlum =

Klooster-Lidlum Kleaster Lidlum
- Village
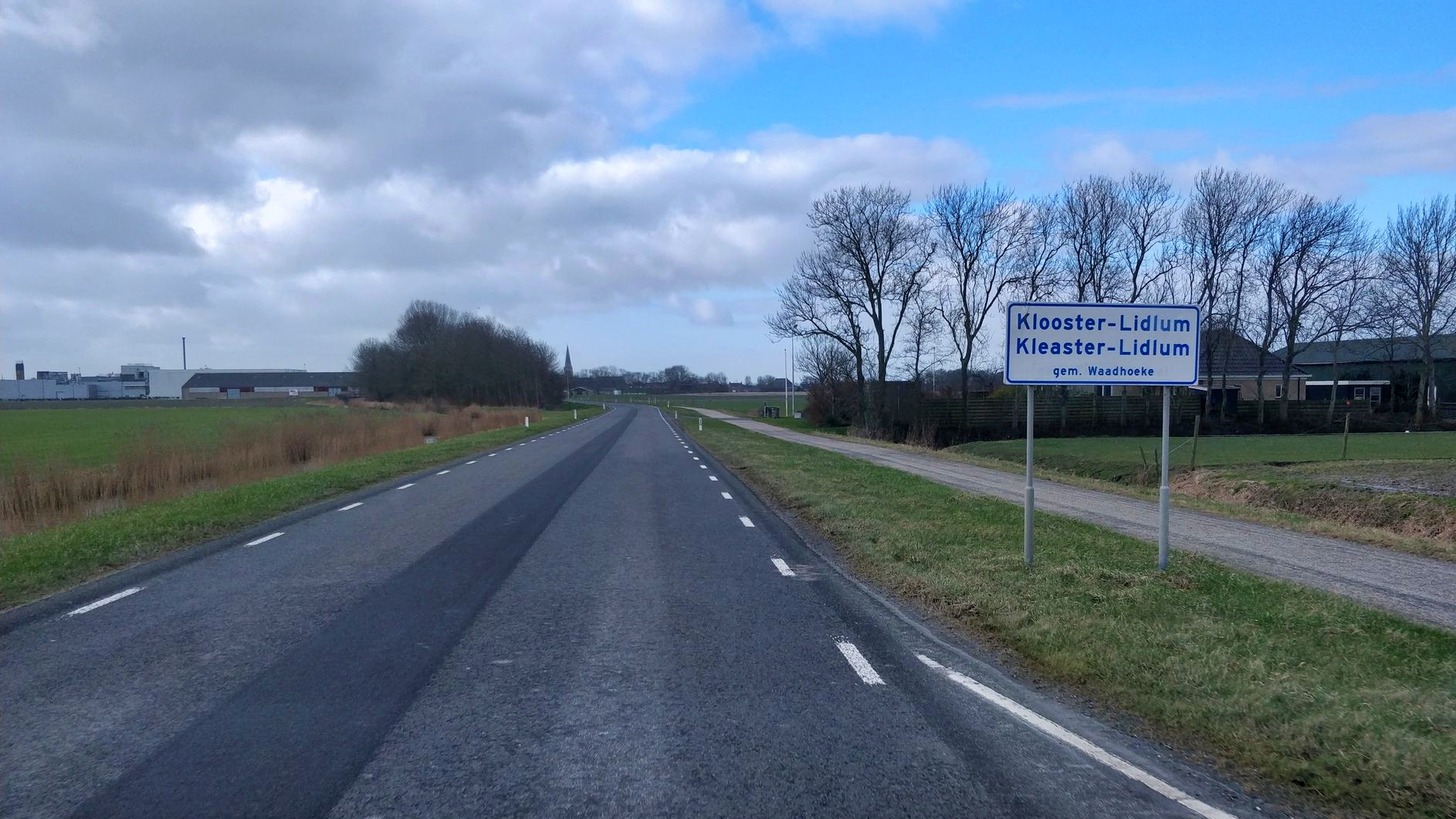

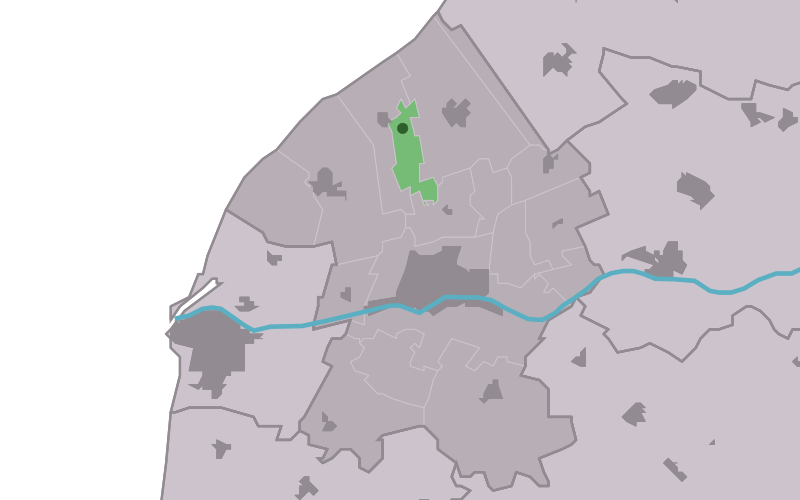
- Location in the Franekeradeel municipality

- Location in the Netherlands Klooster-Lidlum (Netherlands)
- Country: Netherlands
- Province: Friesland
- Municipality: Waadhoeke

Area
  - Total: 2.53 km^{2} (0.98 sq mi)
- Elevation: 1.0 m (3.3 ft)

Population (2021)
  - Total: 45
  - Density: 18/km^{2} (46/sq mi)
- Time zone: UTC+1 (CET)
  - Summer (DST): UTC+2 (CEST)
- Postal code: 8853
- Dialing code: 0518

Klooster-Lidlum (West Frisian: Kleaster-Lidlum) is a small village in Waadhoeke municipality in the province of Friesland, the Netherlands. It had a population of around 38 in January 2014.

== History ==
The village was first mentioned in 1317 as Lidlem, and means "monastery of the settlement of Liudila (person)". The monastery refers to the Premonstratensian abbey Mariëndal which was founded in 1182 near Tzummarum. In 1234, it was moved to Lidlum. In the 13th century, the monastery was home to 600 monks, had several outposts and ruled over 18 parishes. In 1572, it was destroyed by the Geuzen. After its destruction, Caspar de Robles turned it into barracks for Spanish troops. In 1580, the monastery was dissolved.

The village turned into an agriculture community which specialised in potatoes. Klooster-Lidlum was home to 78 people in 1840.

Until 2018, the village was part of the Franekeradeel municipality and until 1984 it belonged to Barradeel municipality.
