= Wijnaldum (disambiguation) =

Wijnaldum is a village in Friesland in the Netherlands.

Wijnaldum is also a surname and may refer to:

- Georginio Wijnaldum (born 1990), Dutch football player
- Giliano Wijnaldum (born 1992), Dutch football player
- Yasmin Wijnaldum (born 1998), Dutch fashion model
