= Pietersbierum =

Pietersbierum Pitersbierrum
- Village
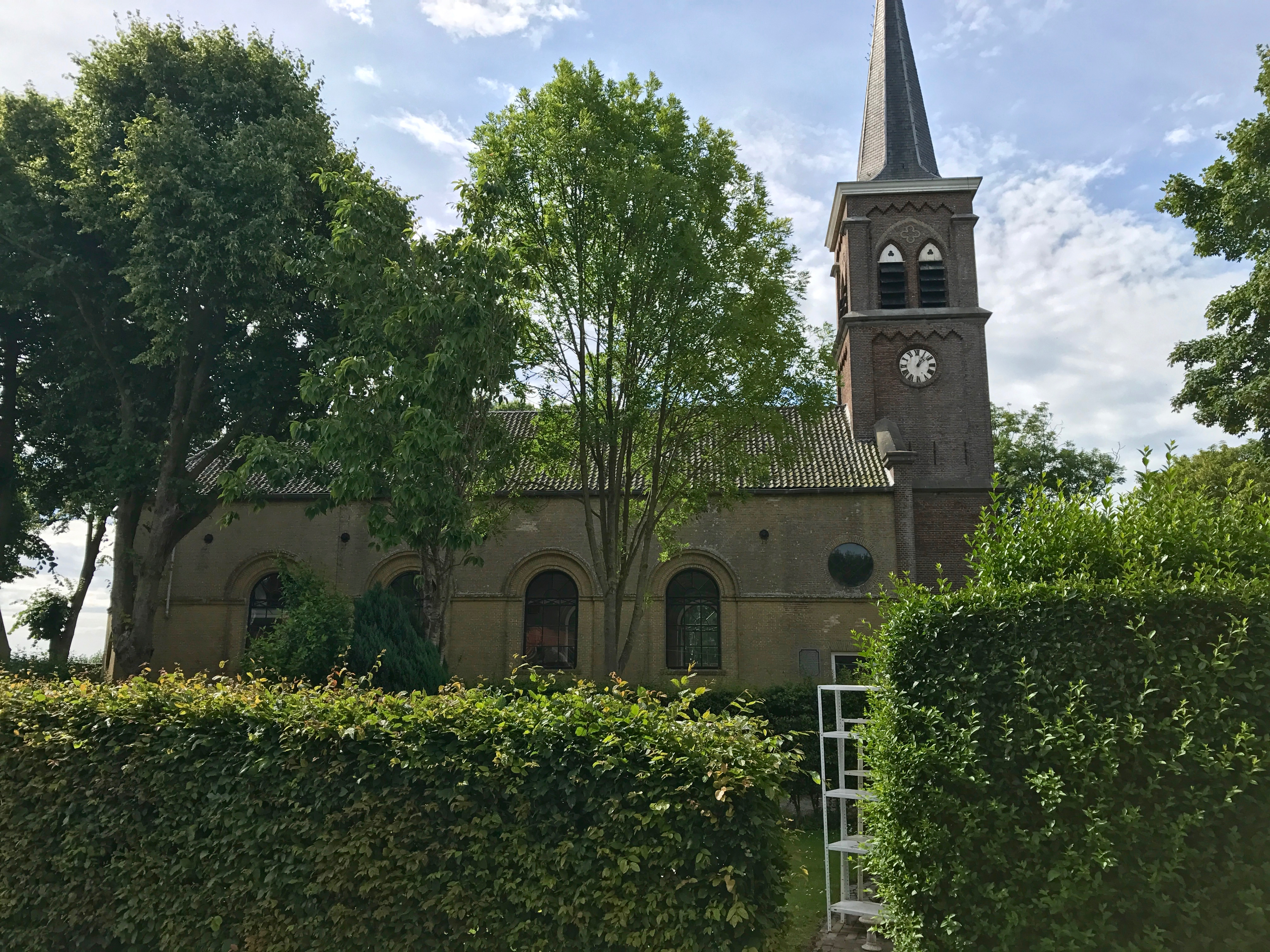
- Pietersbierum church

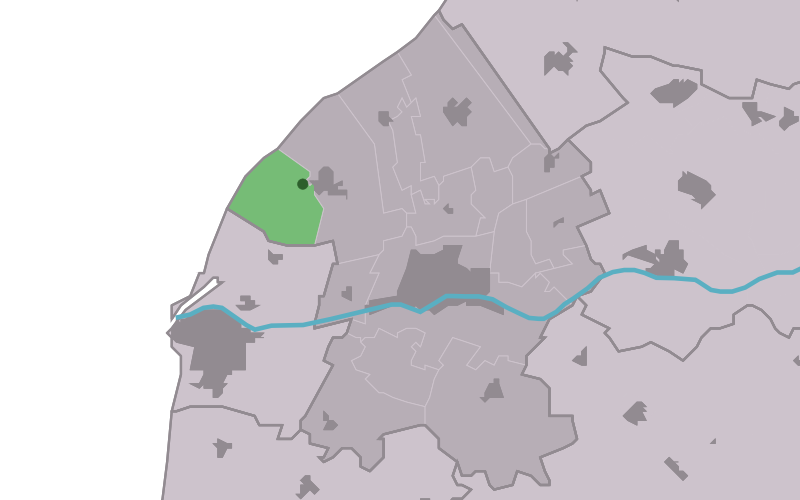
- Location in the Franekeradeel municipality

- Location in the Netherlands Pietersbierum (Netherlands)
- Country: Netherlands
- Province: Friesland
- Municipality: Waadhoeke

Area
  - Total: 5.83 km^{2} (2.25 sq mi)
- Elevation: 0.6 m (2.0 ft)

Population (2021)
  - Total: 140
  - Density: 24/km^{2} (62/sq mi)
- Time zone: UTC+1 (CET)
  - Summer (DST): UTC+2 (CEST)
- Postal code: 8856
- Dialing code: 0517

Pietersbierum (West Frisian: Pitersbierrum) is a village in Waadhoeke municipality in the province of Friesland, the Netherlands. It had a population of around 140 in January 2014.

== History ==
The village was first mentioned in 1398 as Peters berim, and means "house/barn of Saint Peter". Pieterbierum is a terp (artificial living hill) village from the 8th century. It was originally separated from Sexbierum by a trench of the Wadden Sea. The medieval church burnt down in 1843. In 1845, a new church was built which received its Gothic Revival tower in 1878. Even though it has grown attached to Sexbierum and forms a twin village, it is still a separate village.

Walburga State is a villa from 1857. Between 1909 and 1984, it served as the town hall of Barradeel. It was initially located in Pieterbierum until a border correction moved it to Sexbierum. Pietersbierum was home to 380 people in 1840.

Until 2018, the village was part of the Franekeradeel municipality and before 1984 it belonged to Barradeel municipality.

== Gallery ==
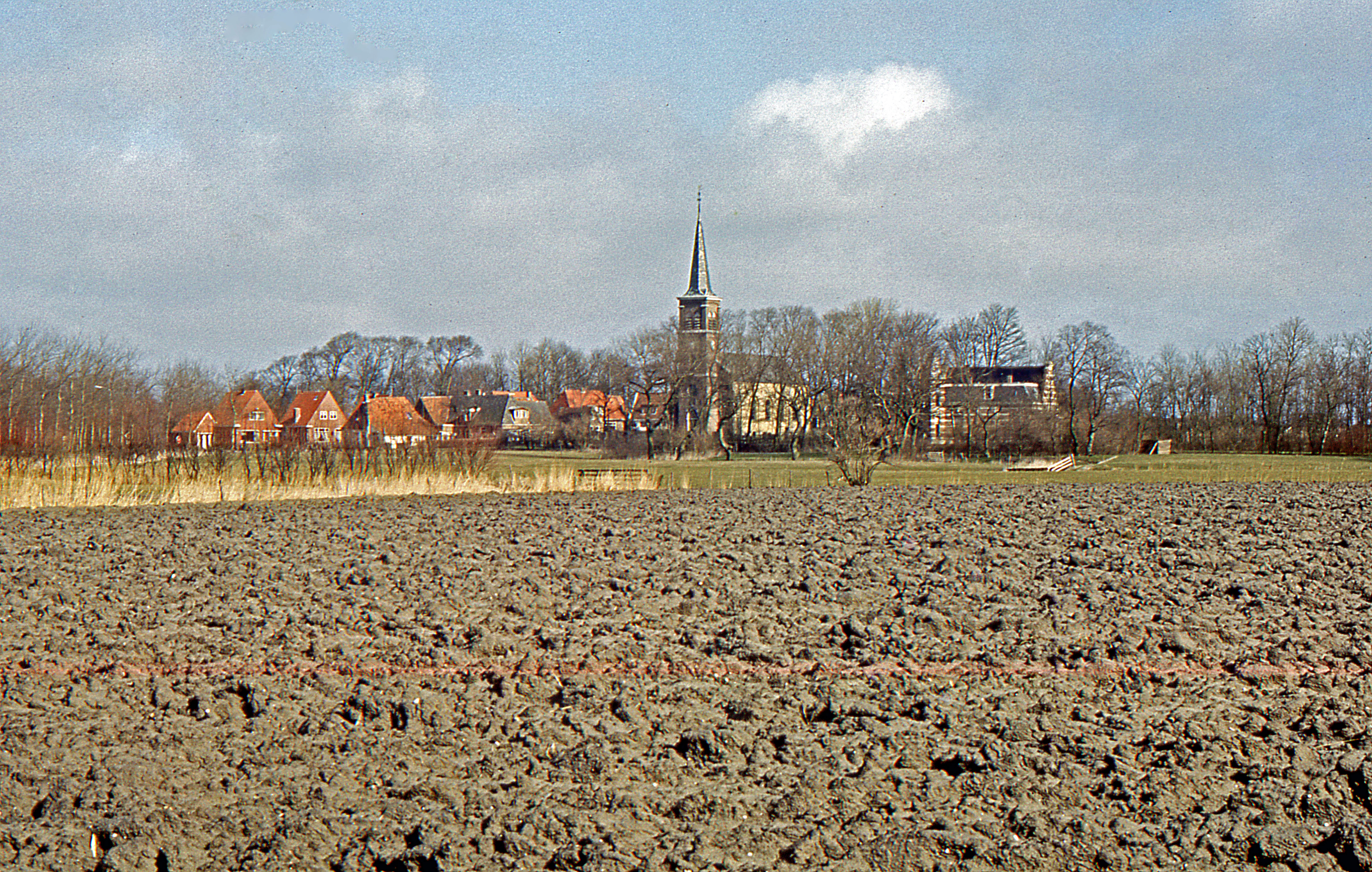
View on Pietersbierum

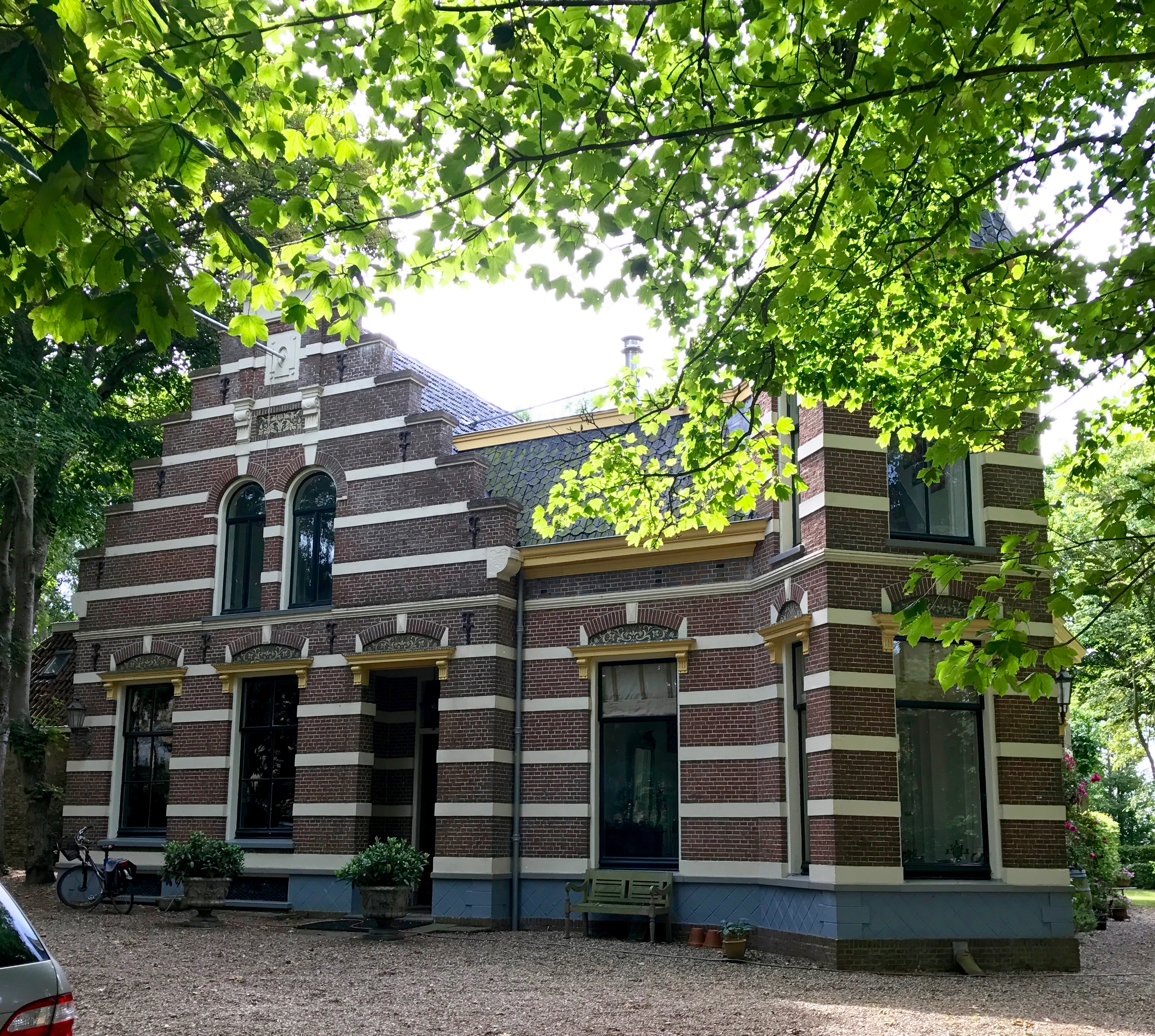
Clergy house
