= Sexbierum =

Sexbierum Seisbierrum
- Village
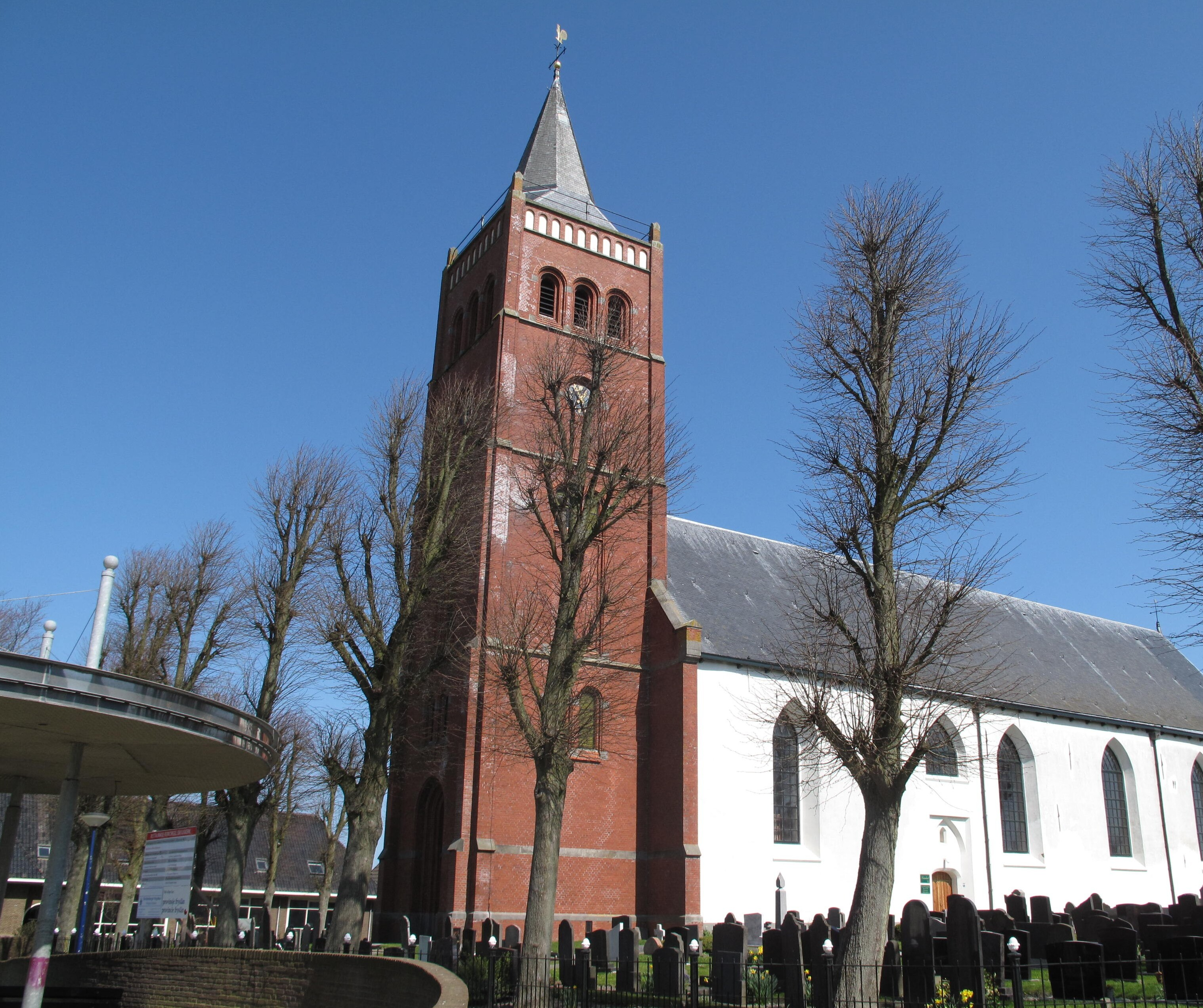
- Sixtus' church

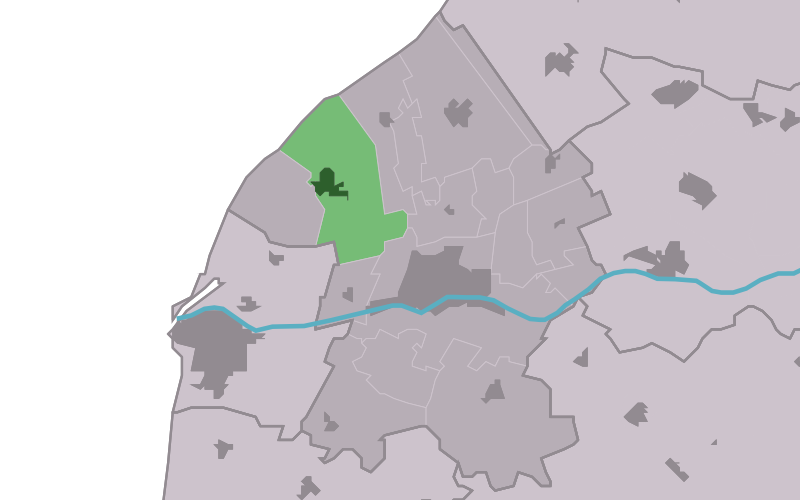
- Location in the Franekeradeel municipality

- Location in the Netherlands Sexbierum (Netherlands)
- Country: Netherlands
- Province: Friesland
- Municipality: Waadhoeke

Area
  - Total: 10.83 km^{2} (4.18 sq mi)
- Elevation: 0.9 m (3.0 ft)

Population (2021)
  - Total: 1,705
  - Density: 157.4/km^{2} (407.7/sq mi)
- Time zone: UTC+1 (CET)
  - Summer (DST): UTC+2 (CEST)
- Postal code: 8855
- Dialing code: 0517

Sexbierum (Dutch: [sɛksˈbiːrʏm]; West Frisian: Seisbierrum [sɛizˈbjɪrəm]) is a village in the municipality of Waadhoeke, in the central north of the Netherlands.

Sexbierum is located in the province of Friesland and located about 7 kilometres (4.3 miles) north-east of Harlingen, about 7 kilometres (4.3 miles) north-west of Franeker. The distance to Amsterdam is about 100 kilometres (62 miles).

The village consists of approximately 600 houses, with 1,744 inhabitants in January 2014.

== History ==
In history the village is first mentioned in the 13th century as Sixtisberen. The name means "houses of Sixtus" and is a reference to pope Sixtus II. The name can be read in Dutch as sex, beer, rum, and therefore, the place name signs get occasionally stolen.

Sexbierum is a terp (artificial living hill) village from the 8th century. It was originally separated from Pietersbierum by a trench of the Wadden Sea. The Dutch Reformed church dates from the 13th century. The Liauckema State was a stins from the 13th century which was demolished in 1824, however the gate house was remained. The grist mill De Korenaar was built in 1868 as a replacement of an earlier wind mill which burnt down. It is currently used as a conference and party centre.

Sexbierum was home to 934 people in 1840. There was a station on the North Friesland Railway which opened in 1903 and closed to passengers in May 1935. In the late 1960s, Sexbierum and the adjoining village of Pietersbierum merged into a single urban area, however they remain separate villages.

Up to 2018, the village was part of the Franekeradeel municipality and up to 1984 it was part of the Barradeel municipality.

== Culture ==
West Frisian is the main language in Sexbierum, but the Dutch language has an increasing influence. Circa 1972 the primary schools in Sexbierum switched to Dutch as the main teaching language, instead of West Frisian. Before 1972 the only lessons taught in Dutch were the Dutch language lessons.

== Notable people ==
Seventeenth century admiral Tjerk Hiddes de Vries was born in the village.

== Gallery ==
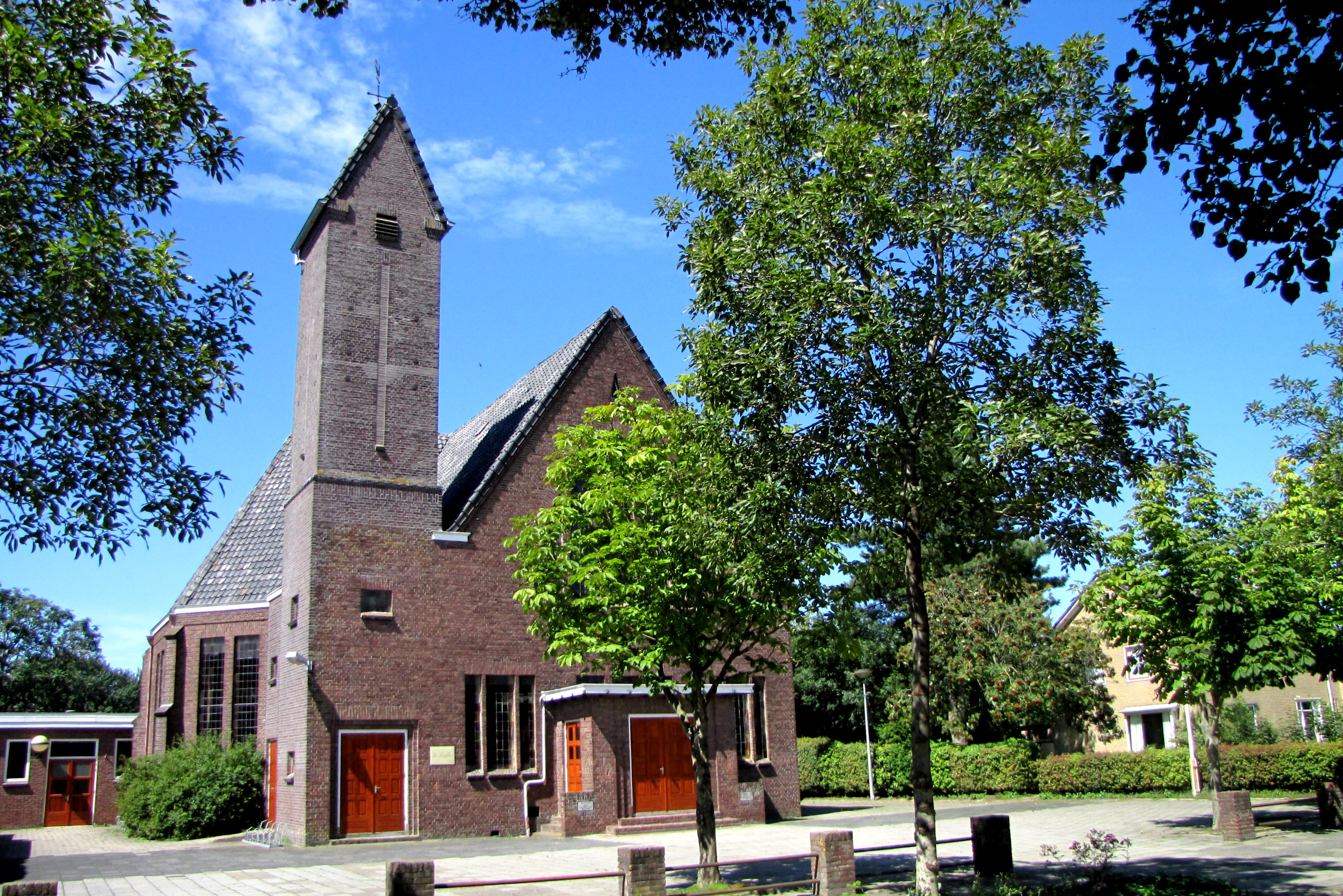
Reformed church

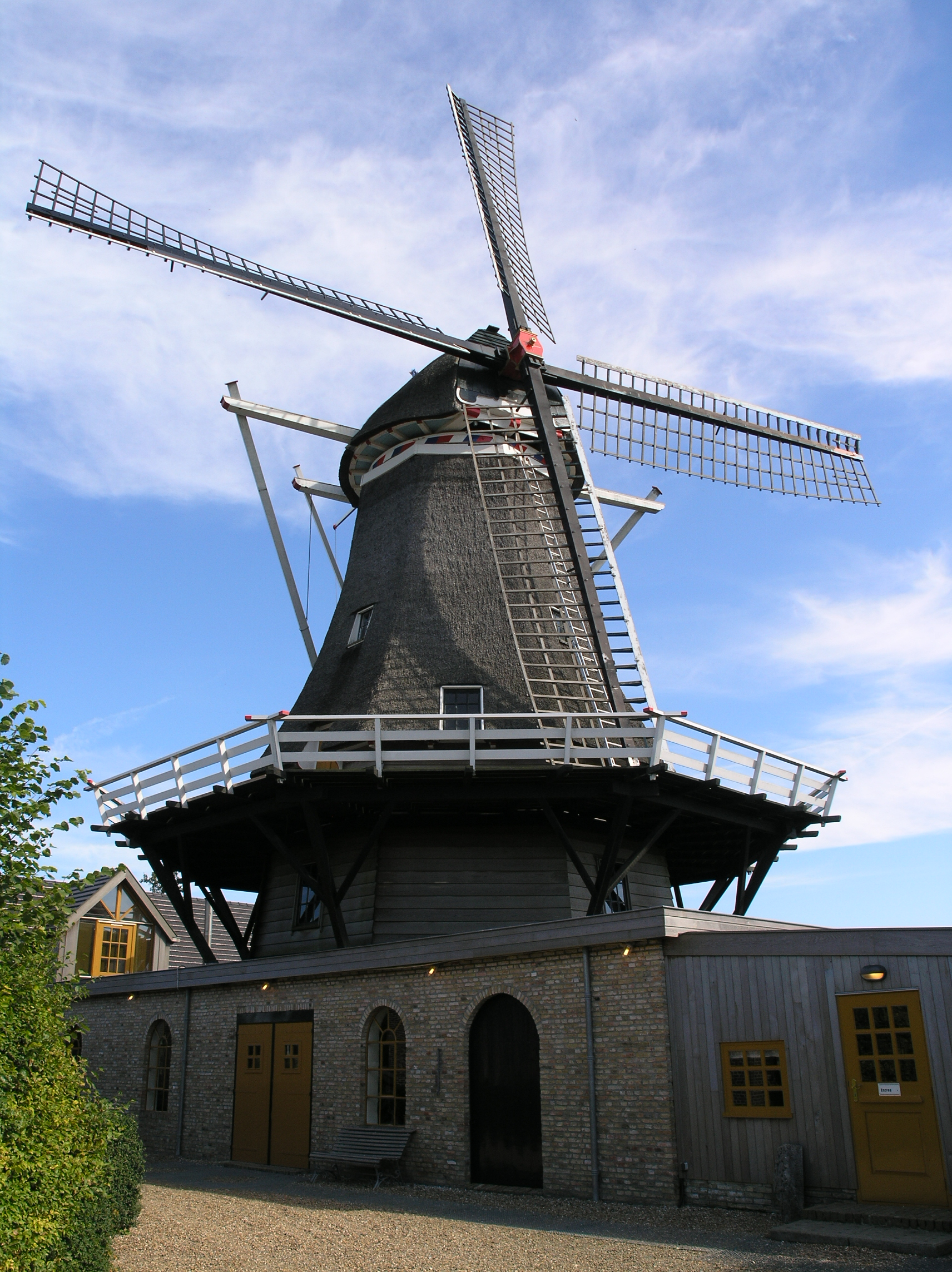
Windmill: De Korenaar

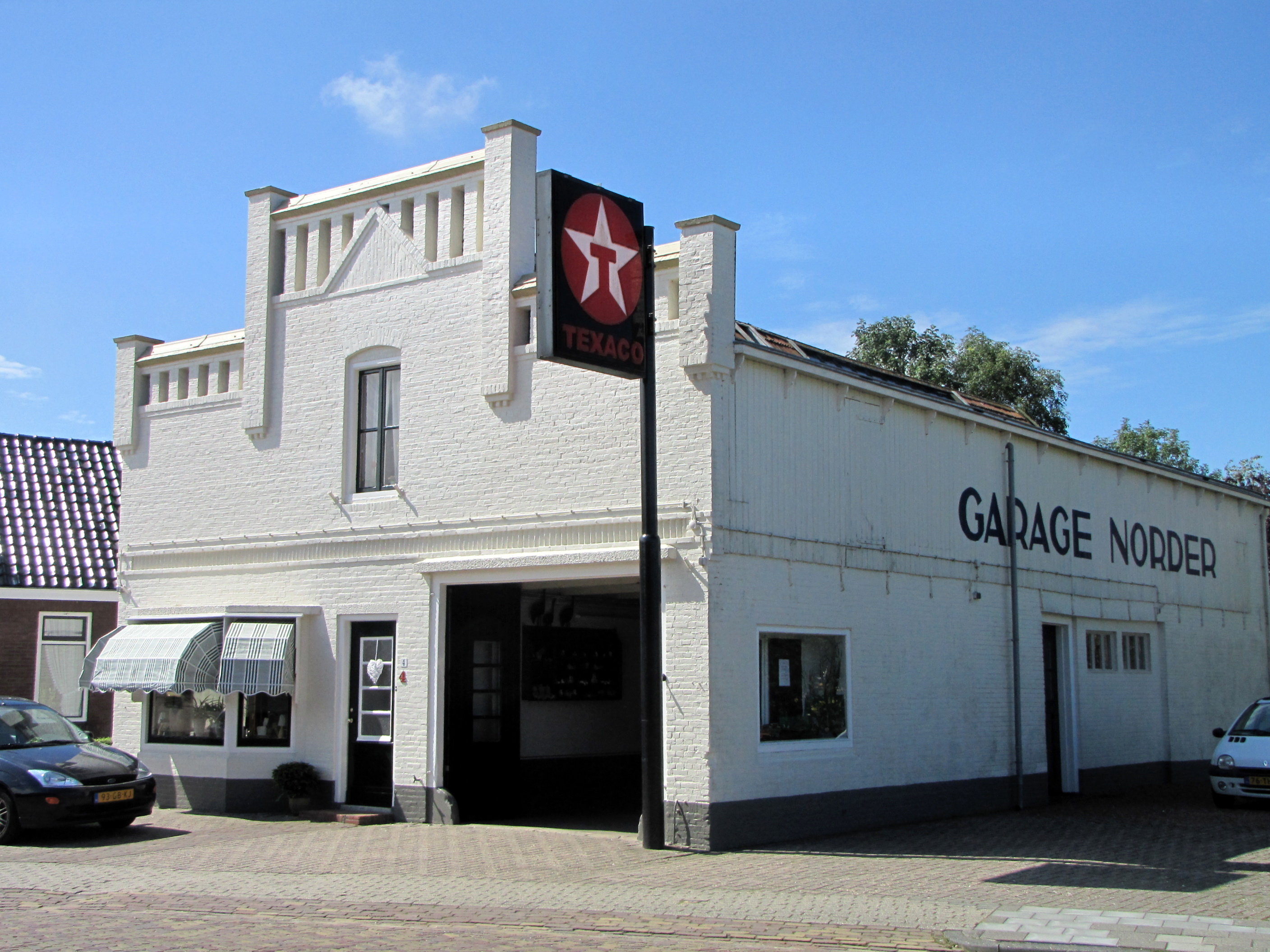
Automobile repair shop

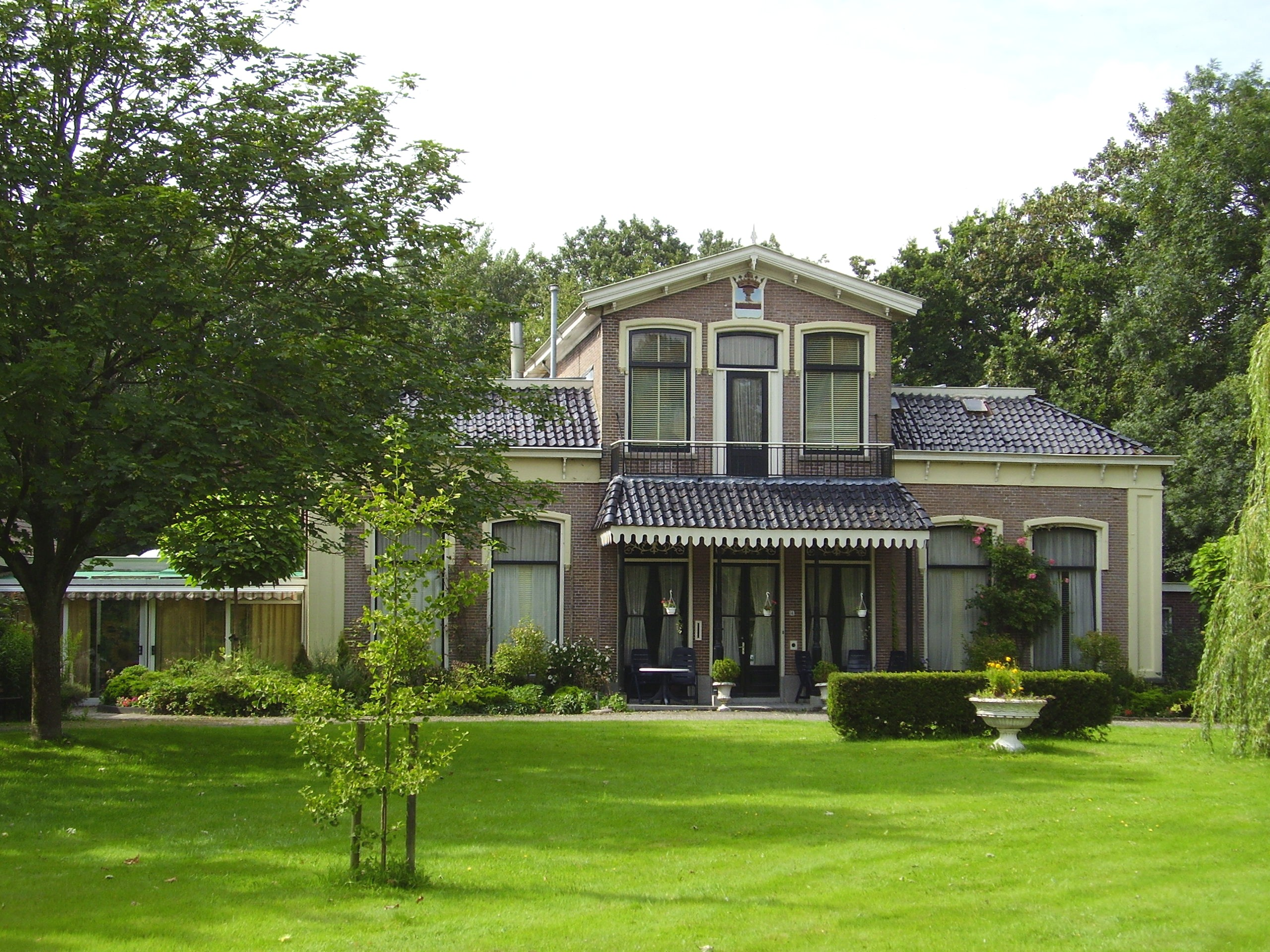
Walburga State

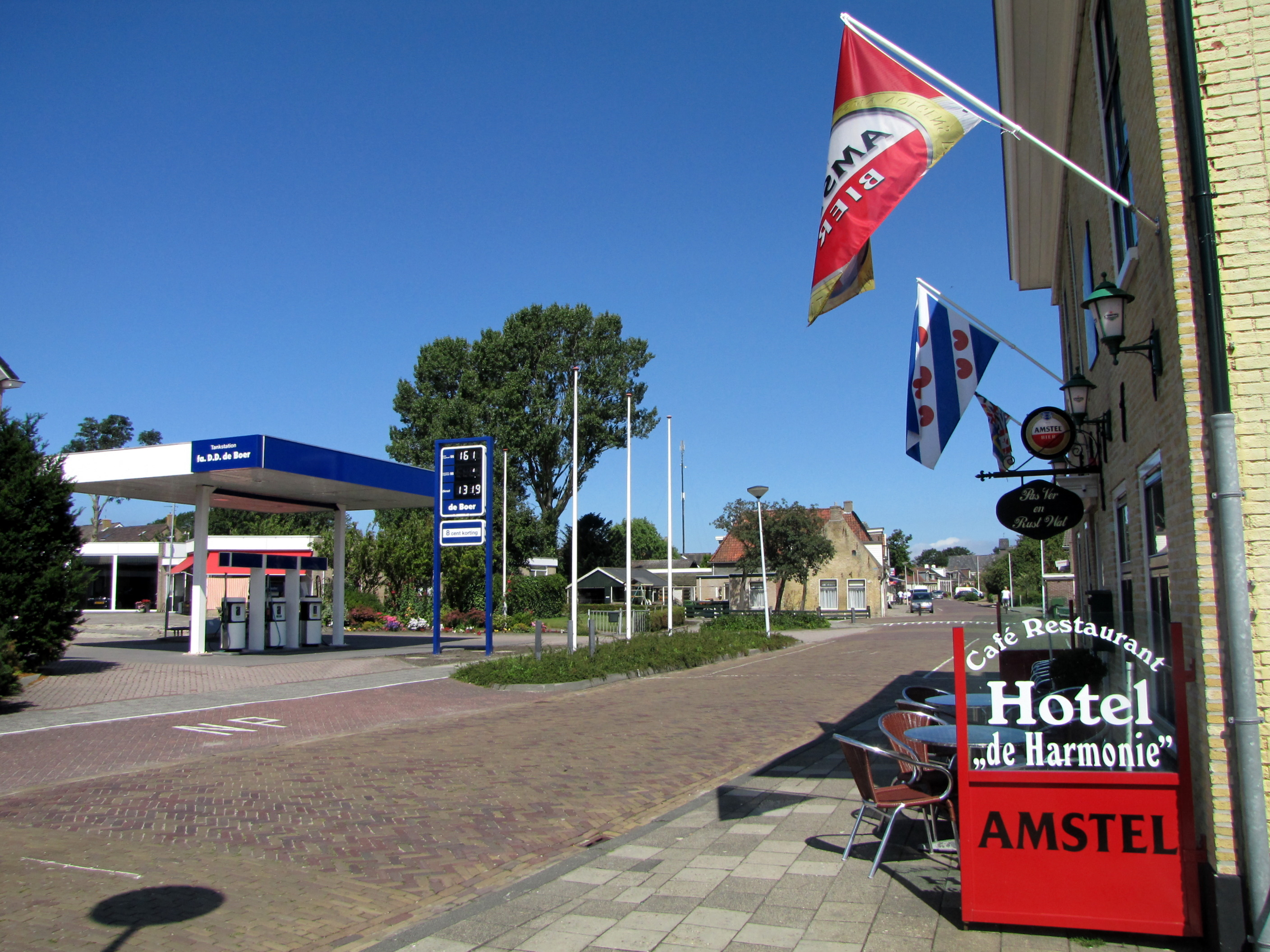
Street view

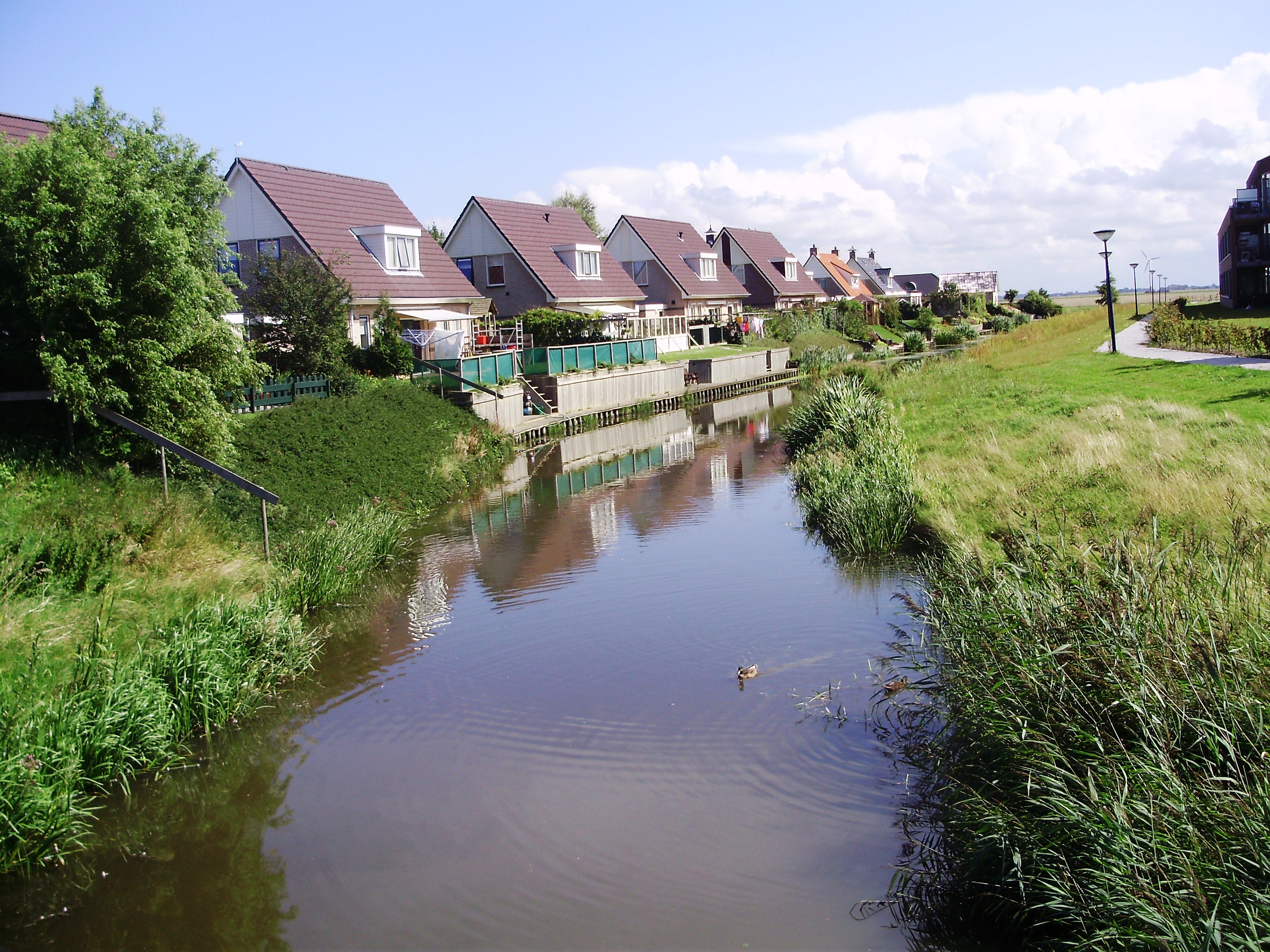
Canal view
