= Oosterbierum =

Oosterbierum Easterbierrum (West Frisian)
- Village
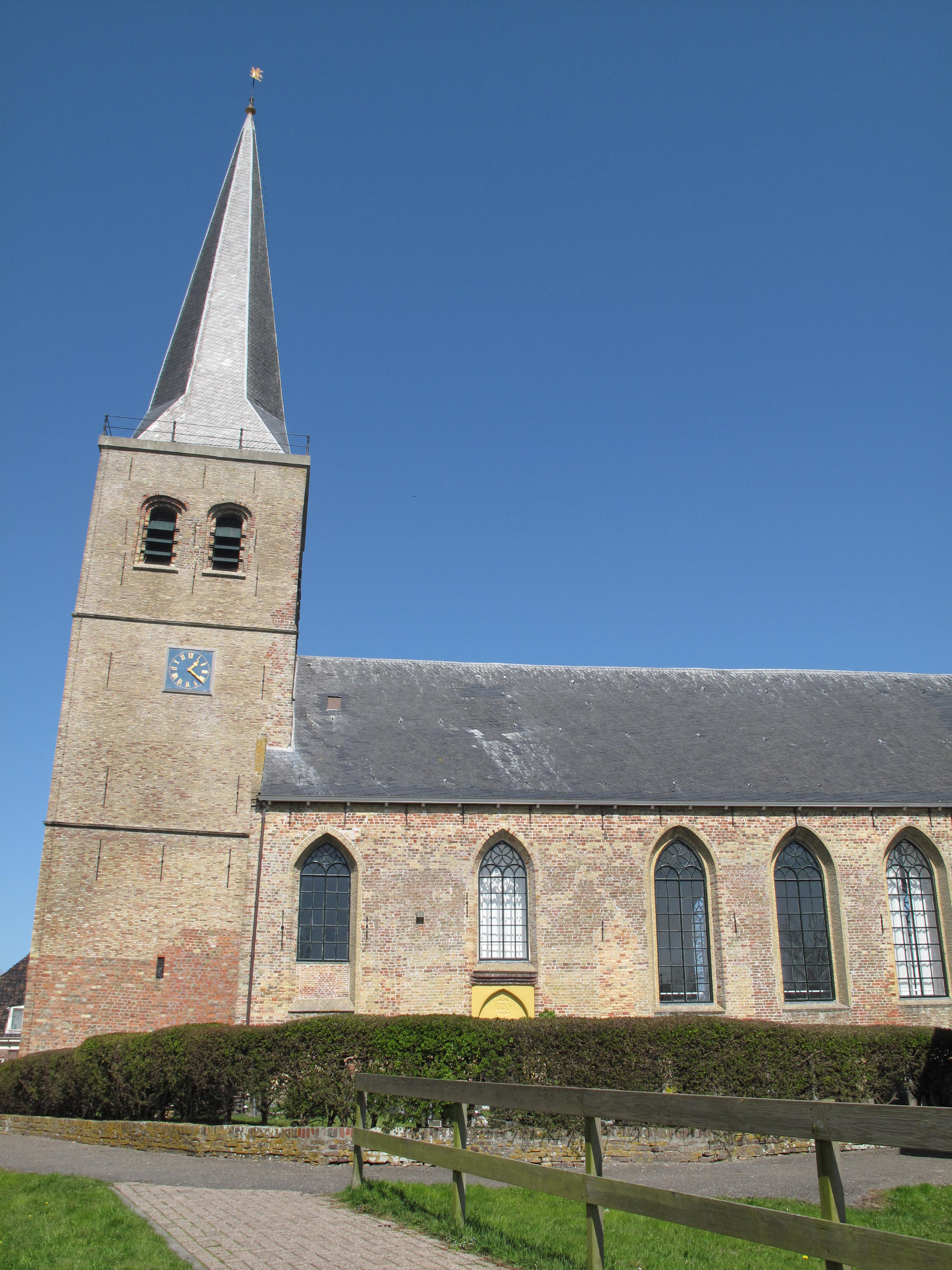
- Oosterbierum church

- Flag Coat of arms

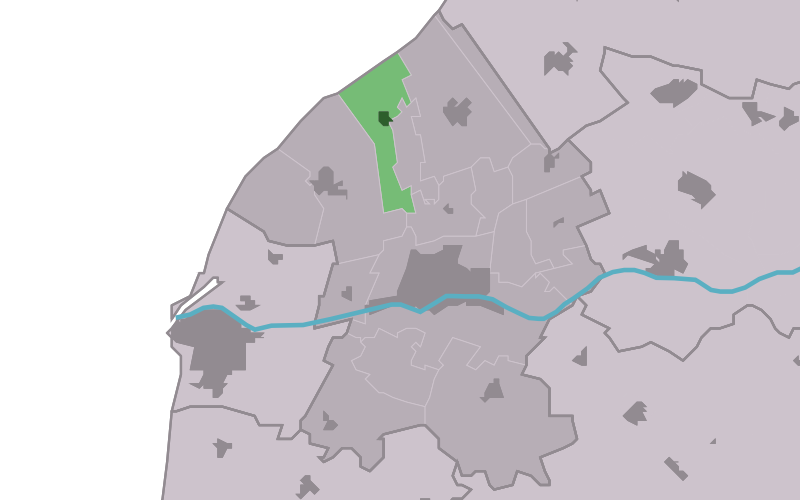
- Location in the Franekeradeel municipality

- Location in the Netherlands Oosterbierum (Netherlands)
- Country: Netherlands
- Province: Friesland
- Municipality: Waadhoeke

Area
  - Total: 5.45 km^{2} (2.10 sq mi)
- Elevation: 1.2 m (3.9 ft)

Population (2021)
  - Total: 540
  - Density: 99/km^{2} (260/sq mi)
- Time zone: UTC+1 (CET)
  - Summer (DST): UTC+2 (CEST)
- Postal code: 8854
- Dialing code: 0518

Oosterbierum (Dutch: [ˌoːstərˈbiːrʏm]; West Frisian: Easterbierrum [ˌjɛstr̩ˈbjɪrəm]) is a village in Waadhoeke municipality in the province of Friesland, the Netherlands. It had a population of around 561 in January 2014.

== History ==
The village was first mentioned in the 13th century as Asterberen, and means "eastern houses/barns". The ooster (east) has been added to distinguish from Westerbeeren which disappeared in a flood in 1322. Oosterbierum developed on a clay ridge near the Wadden Sea.

The Dutch Reformed church dates from around 1200. It was enlarged in the 14th and 16th century. In 1709, the tower was built.

Oosterbierum was home to 592 people in 1840. Until 2018, the village was part of the Franekeradeel municipality and before 1984 it belonged to Barradeel municipality.

== Notable people ==
- Jelle Zijlstra (1918–2001), former prime minister of the Netherlands
- Rinse Zijlstra (1927–2017), politician and former mayor

== Gallery ==
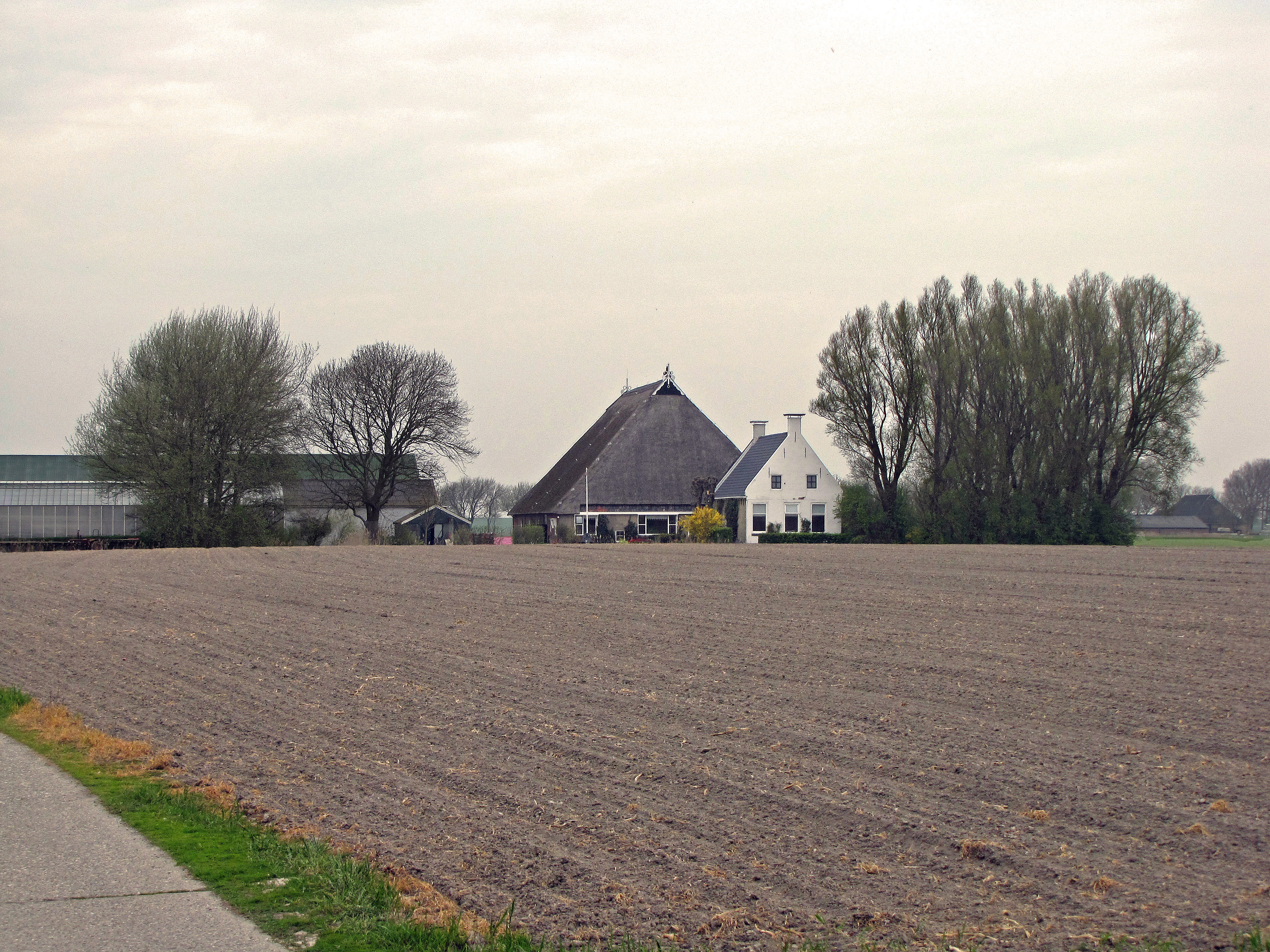
Farm in Oosterbierum

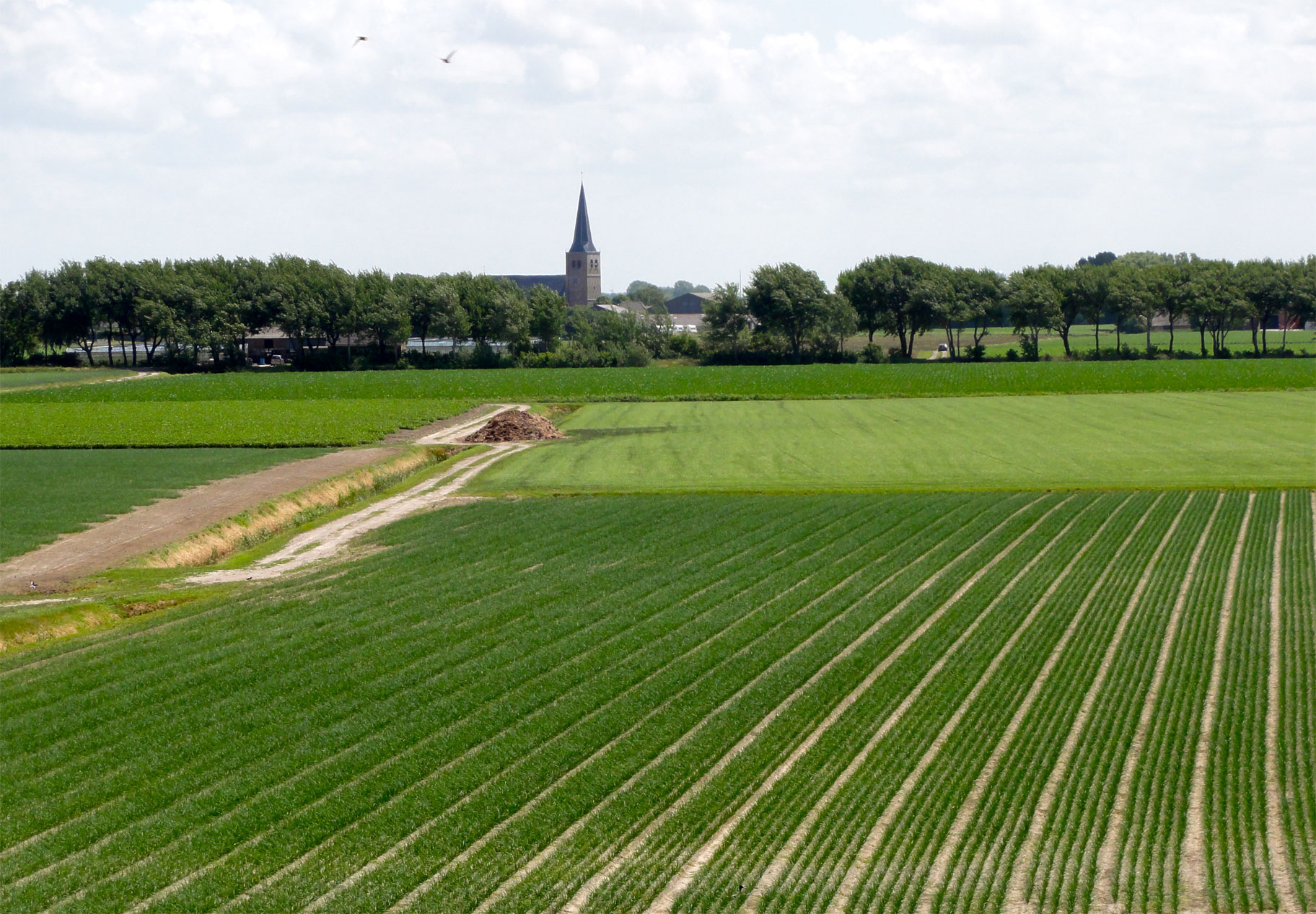
View on Oosterbierum

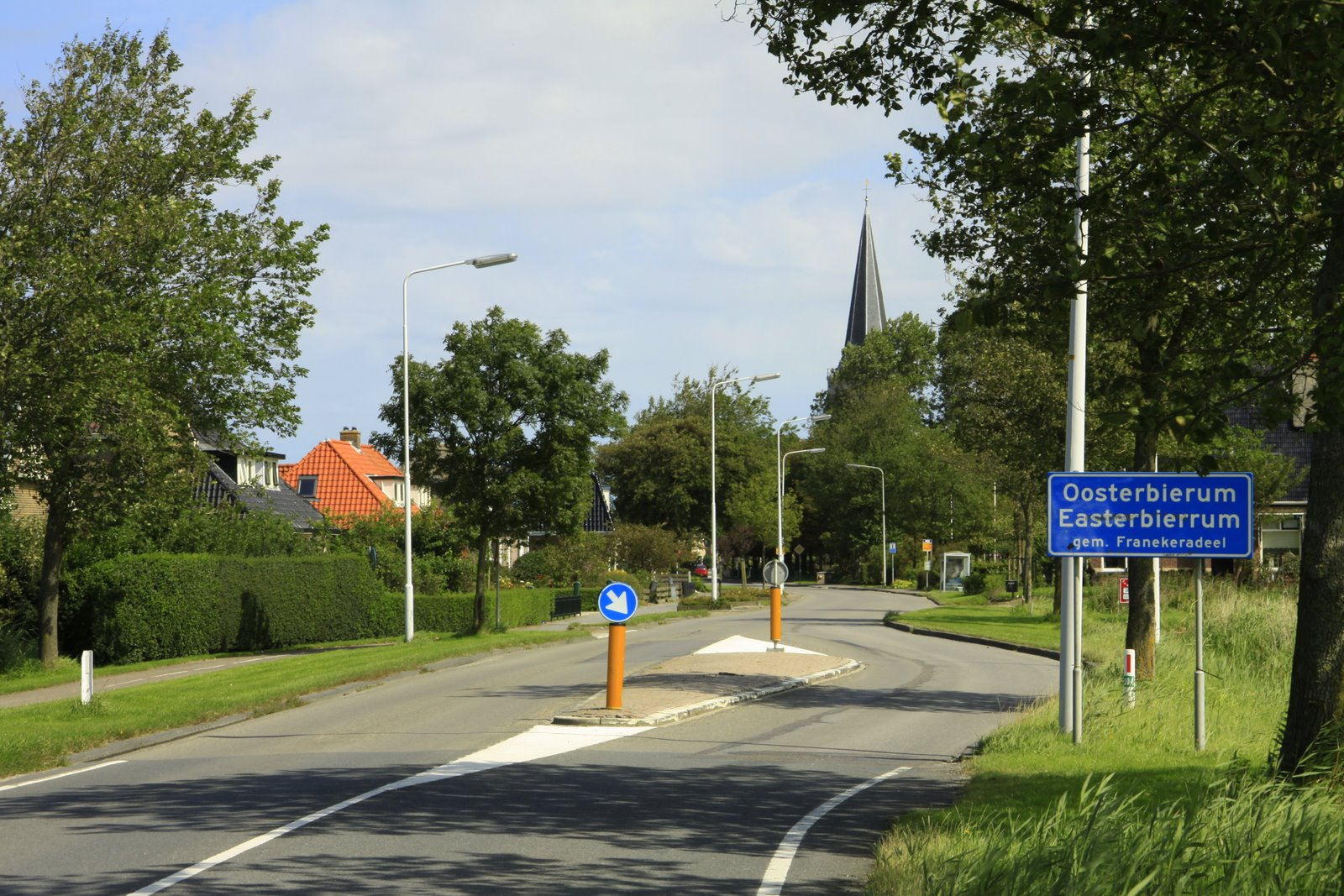
Welcome in Oosterbierum

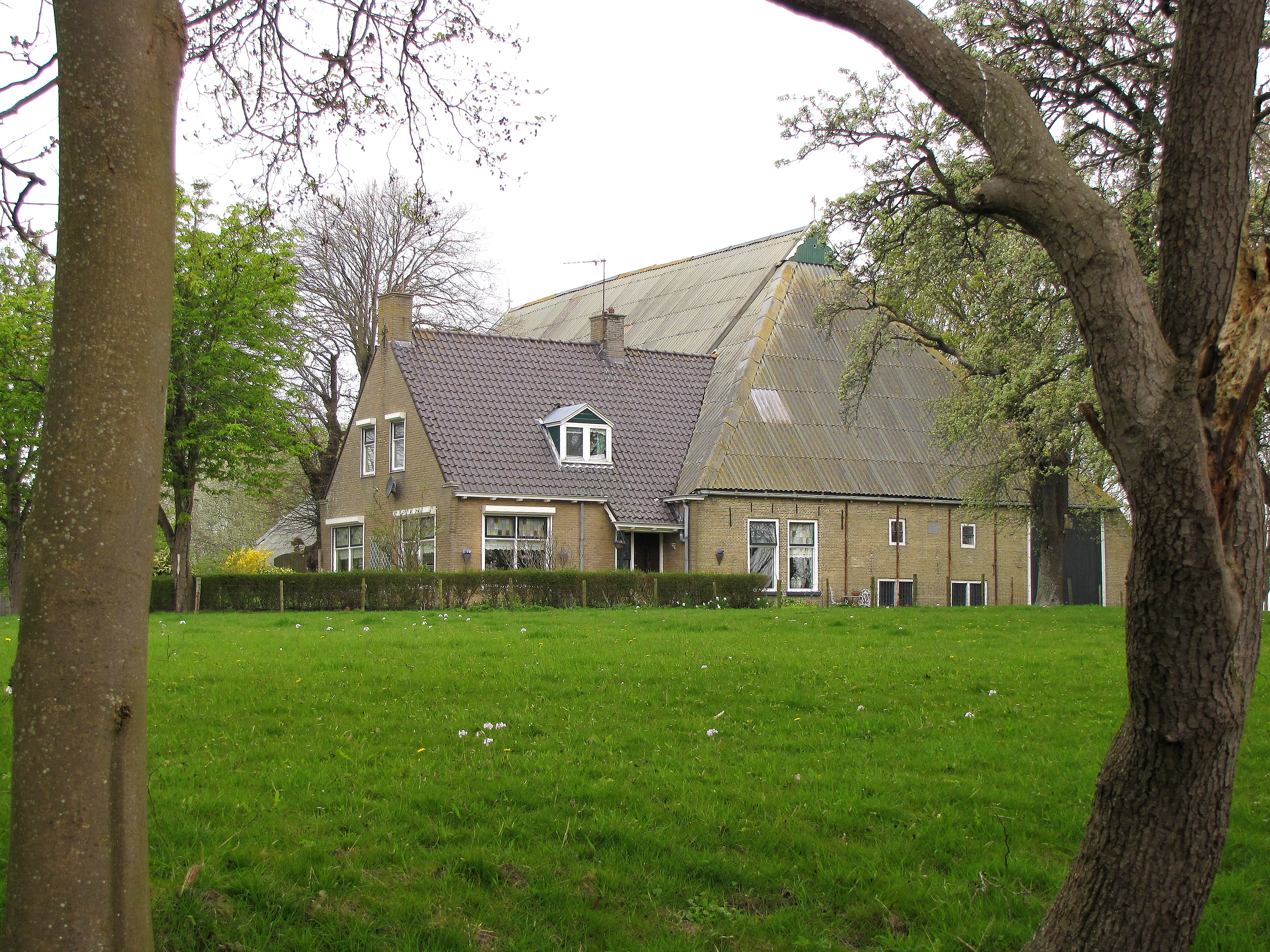
Farm in Oosterbierum
