= Dongjum =

Dongjum Doanjum
- Village
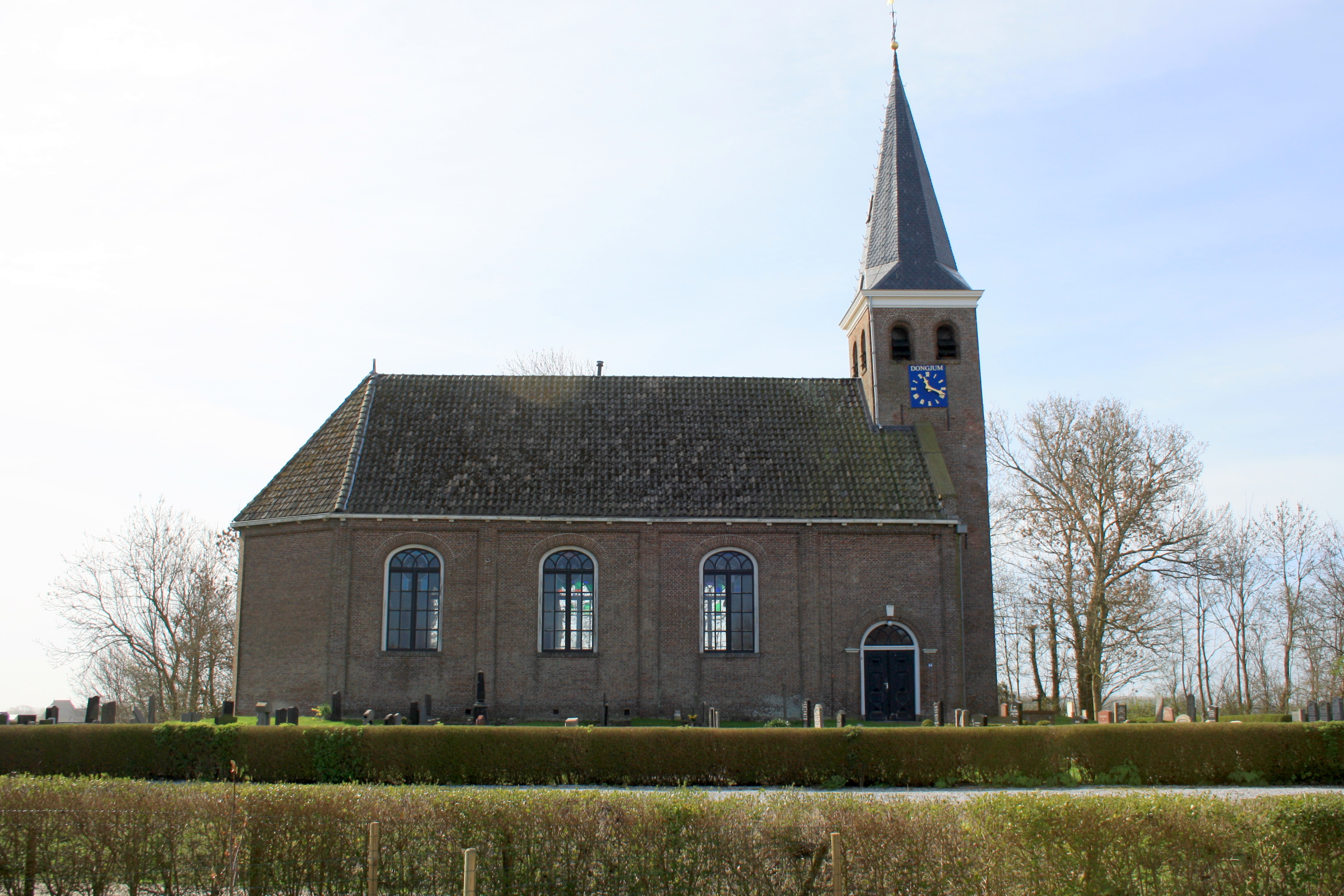
- Dongjum church

- Coat of arms

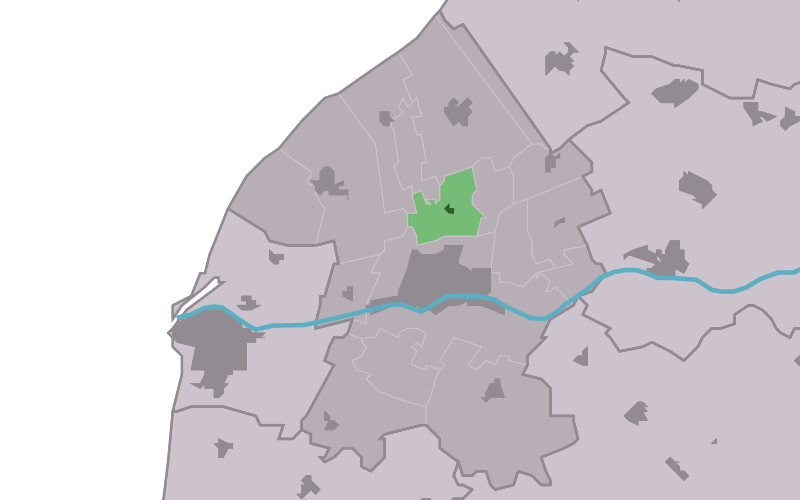
- Location in the Franekeradeel municipality

- Location in the Netherlands Dongjum (Netherlands)
- Country: Netherlands
- Province: Friesland
- Municipality: Waadhoeke

Area
  - Total: 3.50 km^{2} (1.35 sq mi)
- Elevation: 0.4 m (1.3 ft)

Population (2021)
  - Total: 375
  - Density: 107/km^{2} (277/sq mi)
- Time zone: UTC+1 (CET)
  - Summer (DST): UTC+2 (CEST)
- Postal code: 8808
- Dialing code: 0517

Dongjum (Dutch pronunciation: [ˈdɔŋjʏm], West Frisian: Doanjum [ˈdwãːjəm]) is a village in Waadhoeke in the province Friesland of the Netherlands and has around the 326 citizens as of January 2014.

== History ==
Before 2018, the village was part of the Franekeradeel municipality. Dongjum consists of a group Artificial dwelling hills, on an old bank of a watercourse. The area needs as demonstrated by archaeological research already in Roman times have been occupied. From pottery excavated at the time that the residents were quite wealthy. From the end of the Roman Empire until the 5th century, the area was uninhabited for all thoughts.

=== Goslinga State ===
In the early 17th century was the stins Goslinga State built where later grietman and statesman Sicco van Goslinga lived, who died in 1731. The stins were demolished in 1803. In the church of Dongjum (1777) is a mausoleum of Sicco van Goslinga.

== Community ==
Together with the nearby hamlet Boer, has Dongjum Since April 1969 the Association Village Importance Dongjum / Boer. The association maintains contacts with the municipality, housing association and social work. Dongjum has a public primary school called "De Twirre". Beside the school stands the village-house built in 2007, called De Boppeslach.

=== Population ===
- 1954 - 358
- 1959 - 358
- 1964 - 325
- 1969 - 352
- 1974 - 423
- 2004 - 362

== Gallery ==
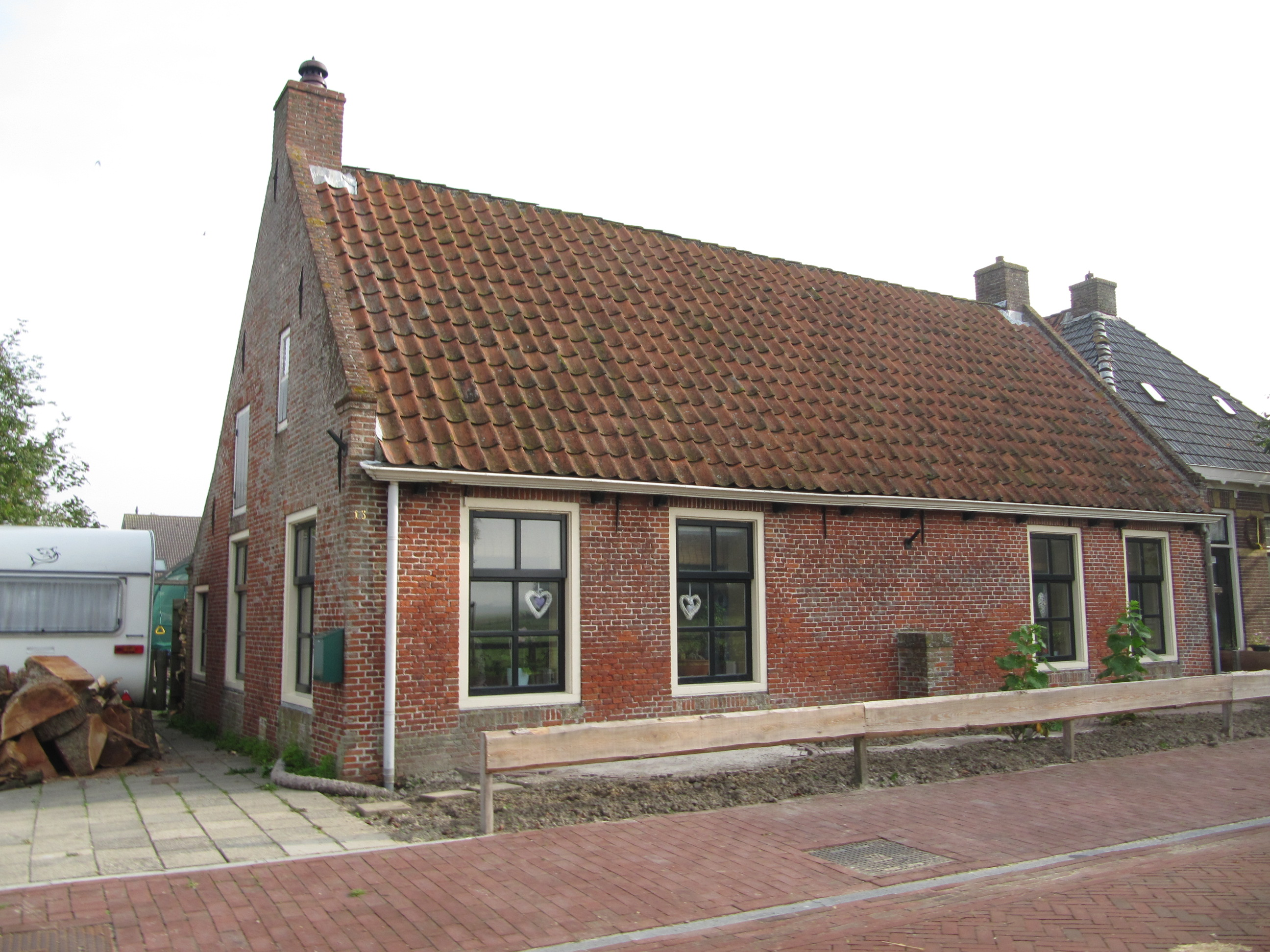
House in Donjum

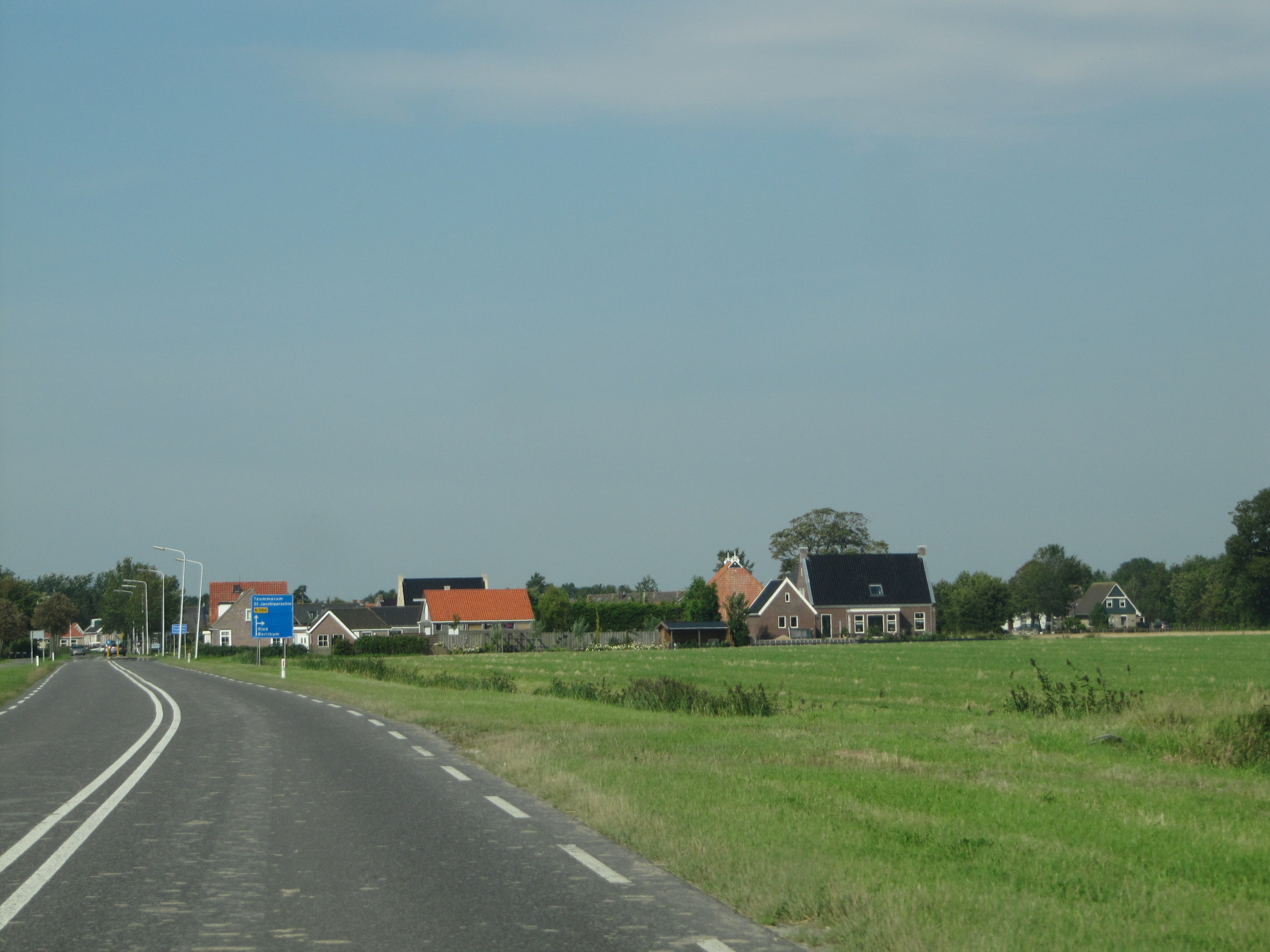
View on Dongjum
