= Franekeradeel =

Franekeradeel Frentsjerteradiel
- Former municipality
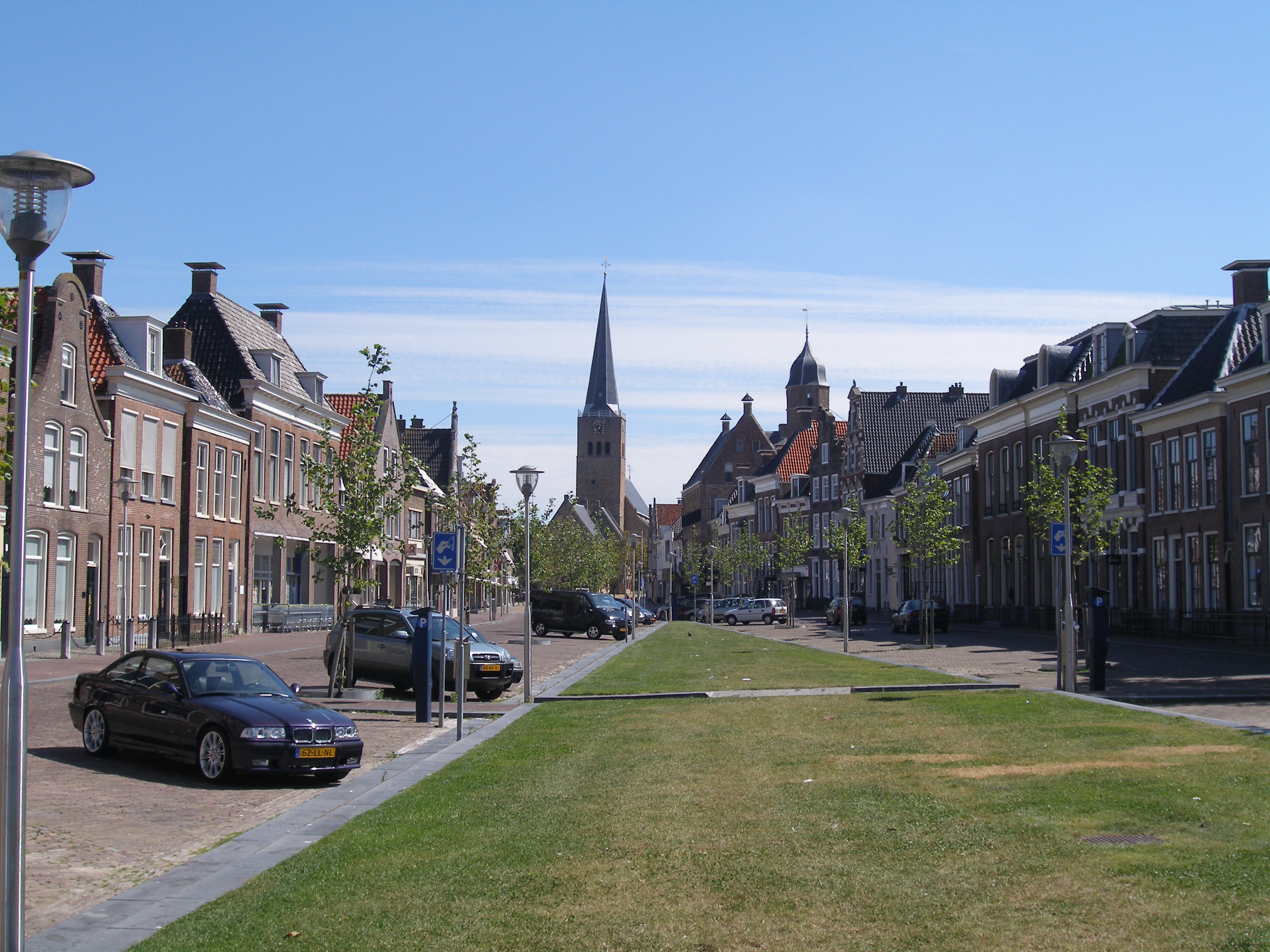
- City of Franeker

- Flag Coat of arms

- Location in Friesland
- Coordinates: 53°11′N 5°32′E
- Country: Netherlands
- Province: Friesland
- Municipality: Waadhoeke

Area
  - Total: 109.17 km^{2} (42.15 sq mi)
  - Land: 102.73 km^{2} (39.66 sq mi)
  - Water: 6.44 km^{2} (2.49 sq mi)
- Elevation: 1 m (3.3 ft)

Population (January 2021)
  - Total: data missing
- Time zone: UTC+1 (CET)
  - Summer (DST): UTC+2 (CEST)
- Postcode: 8800–8814, 8850–8859
- Area code: 0517, 0518
- Website: www.franekeradeel.nl

Franekeradeel (Dutch pronunciation: [ˈfraːnəkəraːˌdeːl]; West Frisian: Frentsjerteradiel [ˈfrɛntsjətəraˌdiəl]) is a former municipality in the northern Netherlands. It was created in 1984 by combining an earlier Franekeradeel municipality with the city of Franeker and parts of the former municipality of Barradeel. On 1 January 2018 it merged with the municipalities of het Bildt, Menameradiel and parts of Littenseradiel to form the new municipality Waadhoeke.

== Population centres ==
Achlum, Boer, Dongjum, Firdgum, Franeker, Herbaijum, Hitzum, Klooster-Lidlum, Oosterbierum, Peins, Pietersbierum, Ried, Schalsum, Sexbierum, Tzum, Tzummarum, Zweins.

=== Topography ===
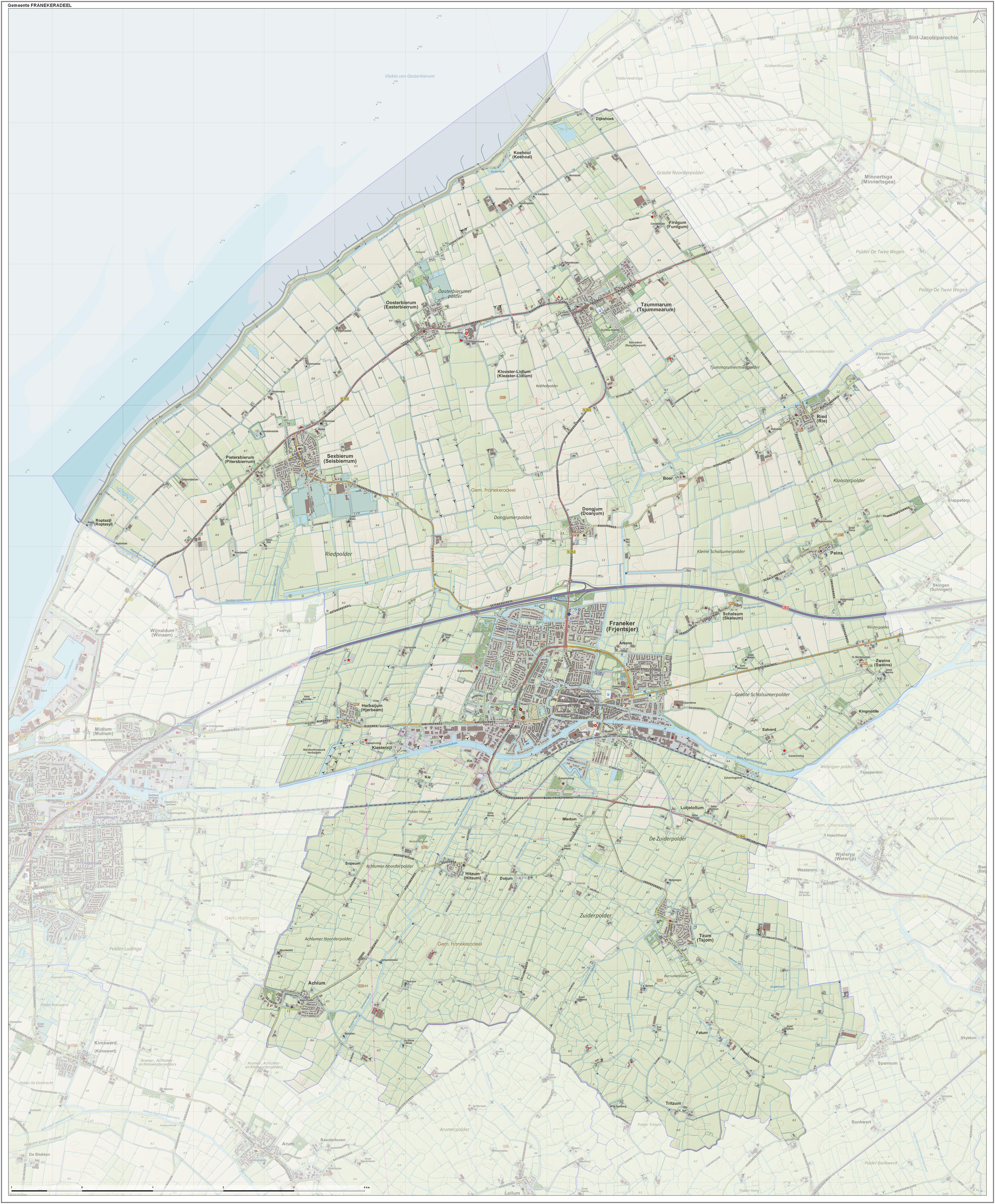

Dutch Topographic map of the former municipality of Franekeradeel, June 2015
