= Barradeel =

- Voormalige gemeente
- Flag Coat of arms

- Location within Netherlands
- Coordinates: 53°13′N 5°29′E
- Country: Netherlands
- Province: Friesland
- Hoofdplaats: Sexbierum

Area
  - Total: 66.98 km^{2} (25.86 sq mi)
  - Land: 54.44 km^{2} (21.02 sq mi)
  - Water: 12.74 km^{2} (4.92 sq mi)

Population (1 January 1974)
  - Total: 6,747
  - Density: 124/km^{2} (320/sq mi)

Barradeel is a former municipality in the Dutch province of Friesland. It was located north of Harlingen and Franeker, and is now largely a part of Franekeradeel. The municipality existed until 1984.

The municipality included the villages of Firdgum, Klooster-Lidlum, Minnertsga, Oosterbierum, Pietersbierum, Sexbierum, Tzummarum, and Wijnaldum. The war cemetery adjacent to the Protestant church in Wijnaldum retains the municipality name.

== Caverns and mining ==
Historically, mining operations took place in the area and caverns have been excavated, being some of the deepest salt solution-mined caverns in the world.
