= Wijnaldum =

Wijnaldum Winaam
- Village
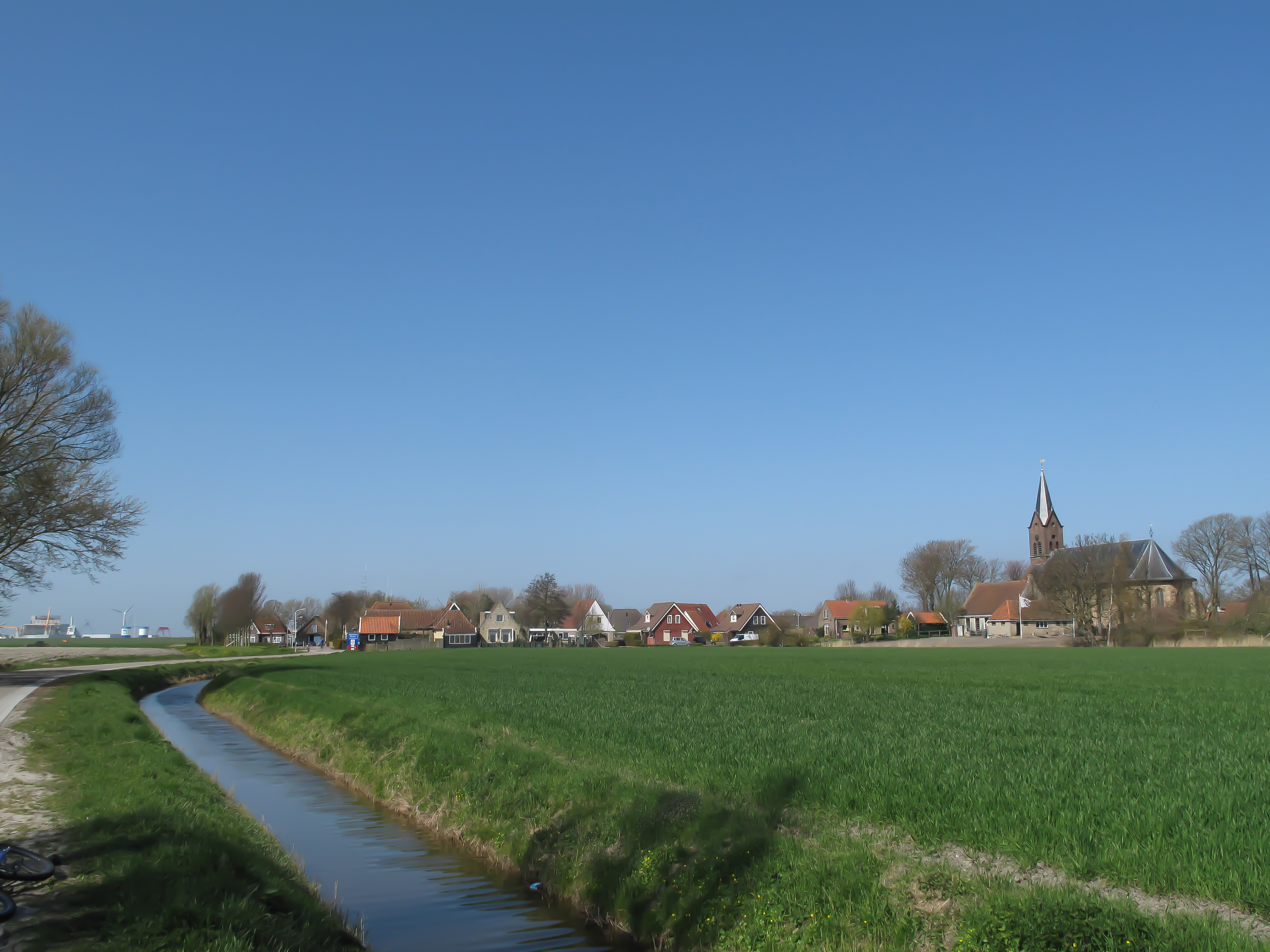
- Wijnaldum in 2010

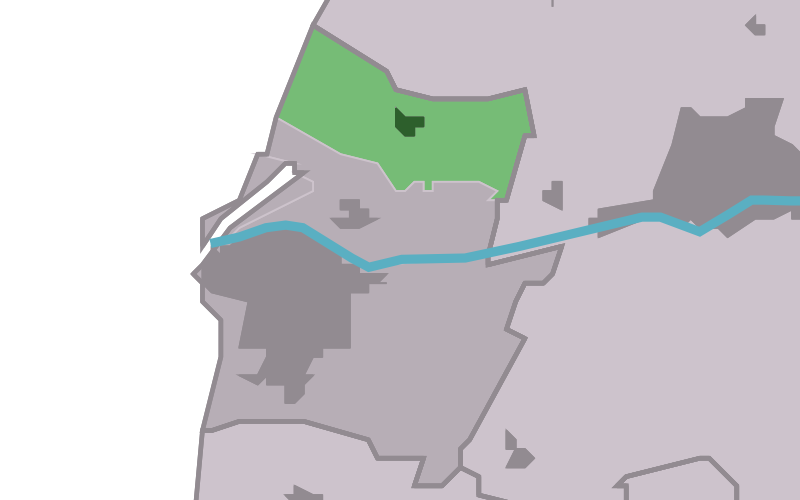
- Location in the Harlingen municipality

- Location in the Netherlands Wijnaldum (Netherlands)
- Coordinates: 53°11′42″N 5°27′35″E
- Country: Netherlands
- Province: Friesland
- Municipality: Harlingen

Area
  - Total: 5.78 km^{2} (2.23 sq mi)
- Elevation: 0.3 m (0.98 ft)

Population (2021)
  - Total: 470
  - Density: 81/km^{2} (210/sq mi)
- Time zone: UTC+1 (CET)
  - Summer (DST): UTC+2 (CEST)
- Postal code: 8857
- Dialing code: 0517

Wijnaldum (Dutch pronunciation: [ʋɛiˈnɑldʏm]; West Frisian: Winaam) is a village in northwest Friesland, the Netherlands. The village lies within the municipality of Harlingen, however, prior to 1984, it was a part of the municipality of Barradeel. The village center has approximately 100 residents, with about 490 residents in the entire village (including the neighborhoods of Lutkeburen, Haule, hamlet Foarryp and small part of the hamlet Roptasyl).

== History ==
The village church, traditionally Dutch Reformed (Hervormde) and now part of the Protestant Church in the Netherlands, was dedicated to St. Anthony prior to the Reformation. Ruins from a tower that collapsed in 1684 are still visible on the church's north side. The church is particularly known for its detailed, wood-carved pulpit dating from 1729. There are war graves within the cemetery.

The discovery of a fibula of exquisite quality started archaeological research (the most extensive excavation of a Dutch terp), from which could be concluded that Wijnaldum was already an important establishment in the 7th century. This history has been visualized in an archaeological annex located in the old consistory building in the village.

Further research showed that during that time in Wijnaldum, buildings existed belonging to gold and silver smiths, bronze casting craftsmen, glass and amber craftsmen, weavers and a weapon smith. Amongst others, also a dirham (an Arab coin) that was placed into an ornament was discovered during excavation. This had possibly found its way there through trade with Vikings.

In 1992, the province of Friesland decided not to appropriate funds for a second stage of the excavation.

== Gallery ==
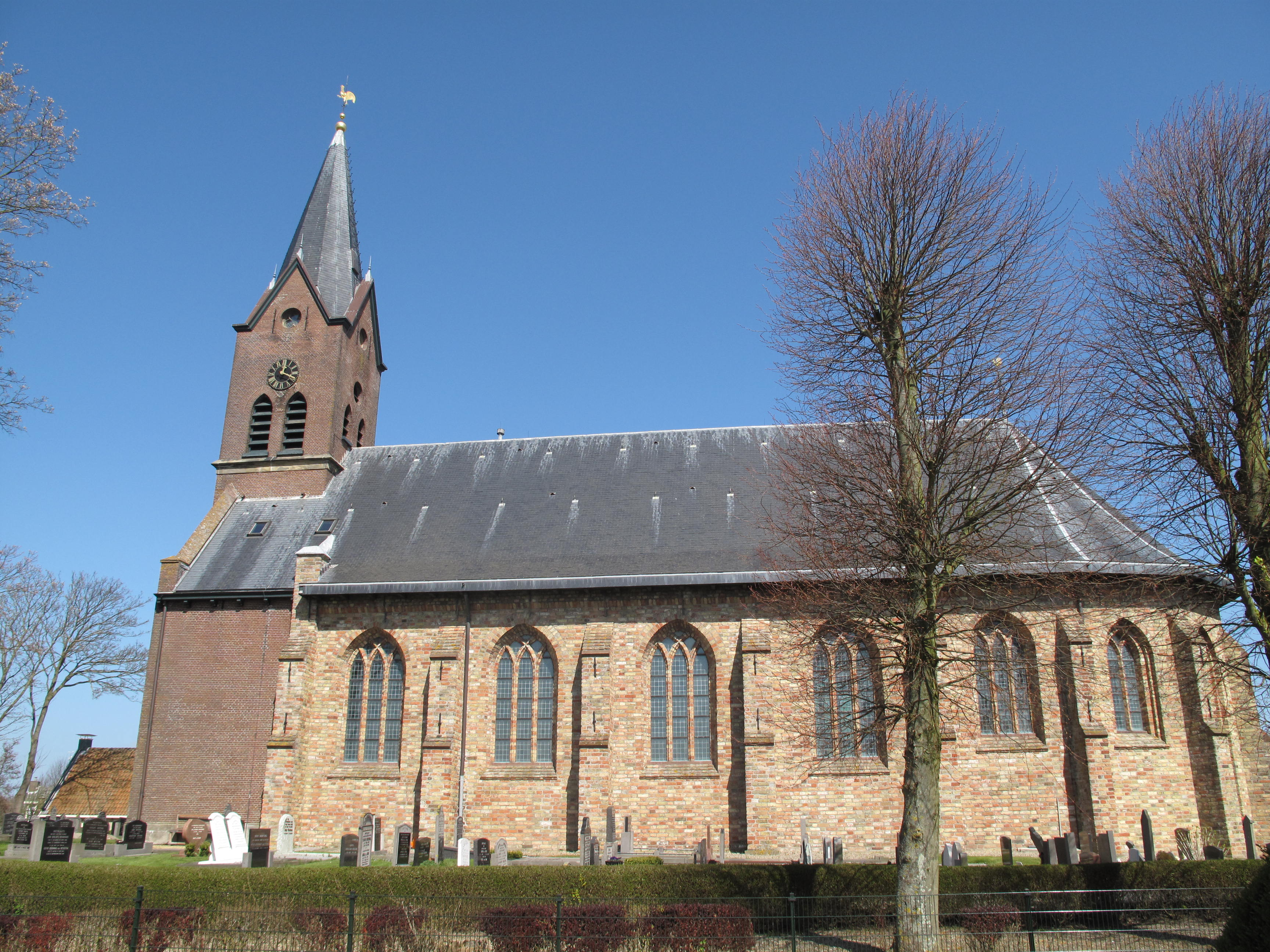
Wijnaldum church in 2010

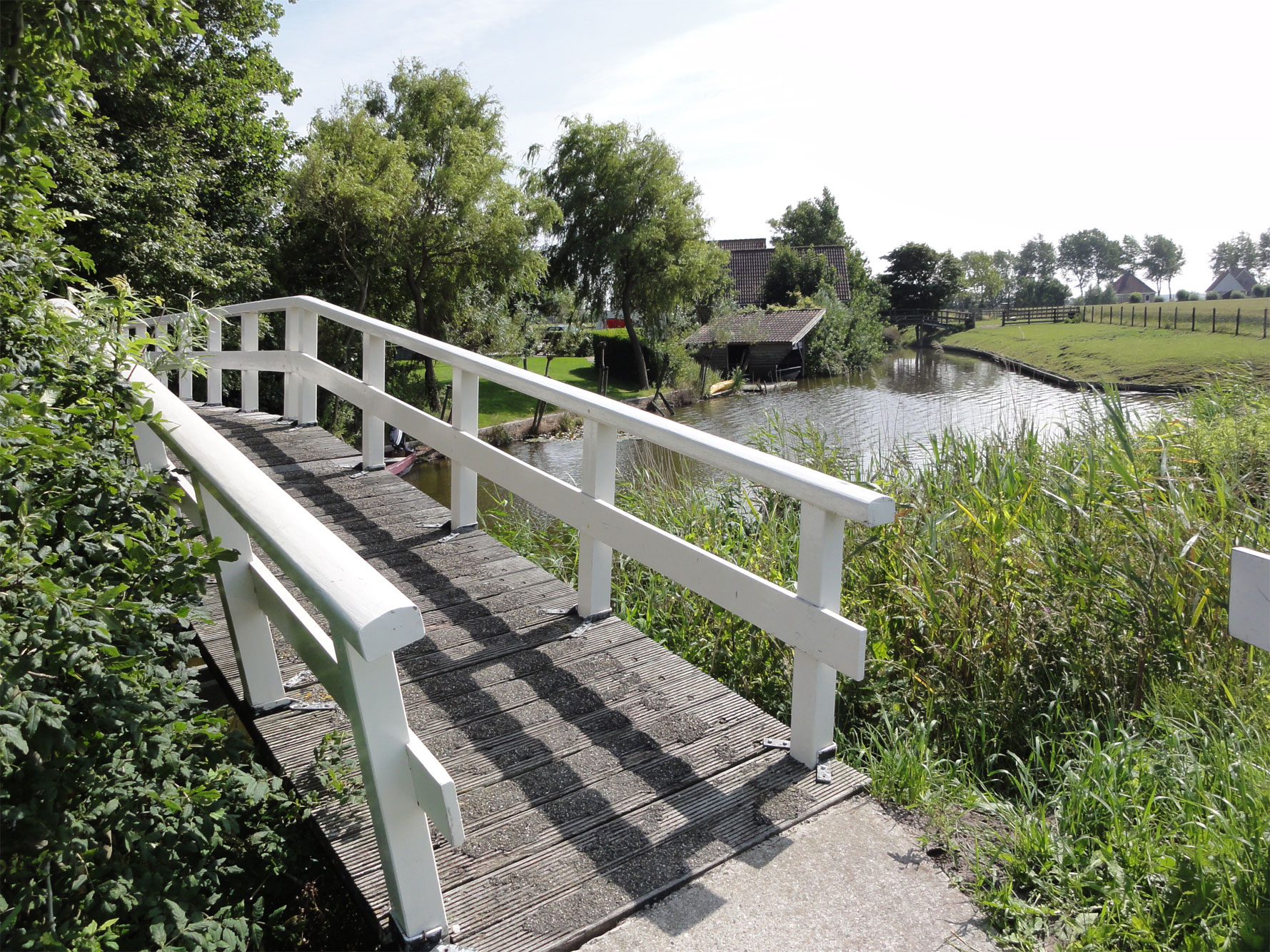
Little bridge over the Sexbierumervaart

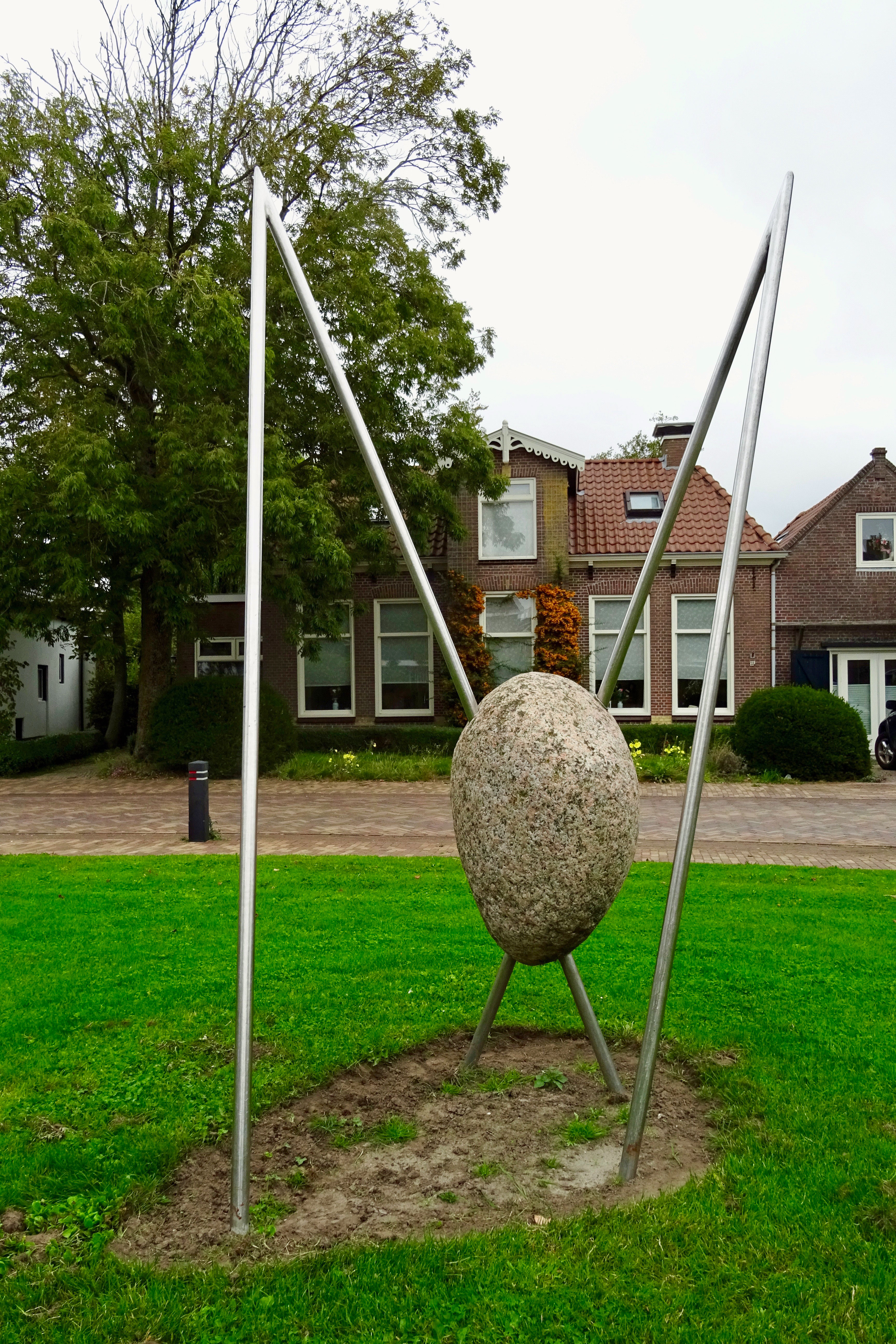
Art in Wijnaldum
