= Tzummarum =

Tzummarum Tsjummearum
- Village
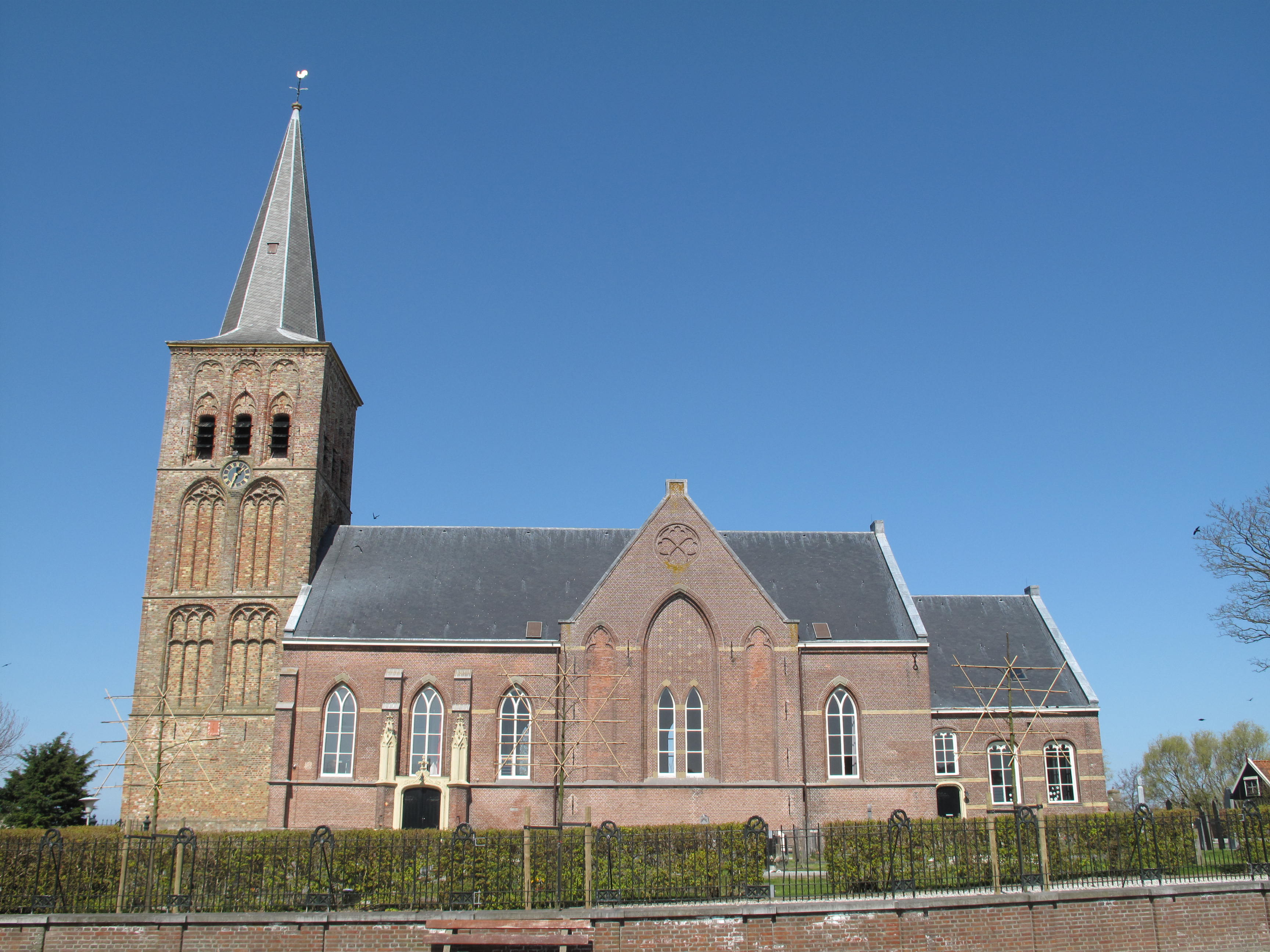
- St Martin's church

- Flag Coat of arms

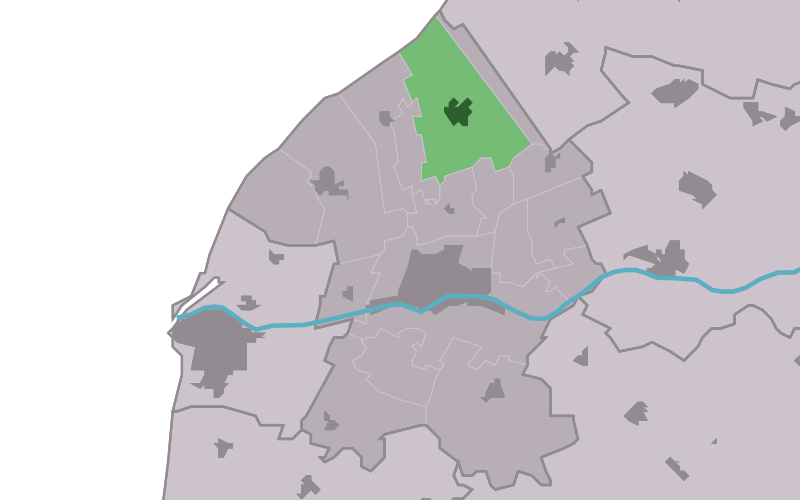
- Location in the Franekeradeel municipality

- Location in the Netherlands Tzummarum (Netherlands)
- Country: Netherlands
- Province: Friesland
- Municipality: Waadhoeke

Area
  - Total: 11.55 km^{2} (4.46 sq mi)
- Elevation: 0.6 m (2.0 ft)

Population (2021)
  - Total: 1,370
  - Density: 119/km^{2} (307/sq mi)
- Time zone: UTC+1 (CET)
  - Summer (DST): UTC+2 (CEST)
- Postal code: 8851
- Dialing code: 0518

Tzummarum (Dutch: [tsʏˈmaːrʏm]; West Frisian: Tsjummearum [tsjøˈmɪərəm]) is a village in Waadhoeke municipality in the province of Friesland, the Netherlands. It had a population of around 1,414 in January 2014.

== History ==
The village was first mentioned in the 13th century as de Thumarentum, and means "settlement of Tyedmar (person)". Tzummarum is a terp (artificial living hill) village developed in the 8th century along the Wadden Sea. It was mainly a fishing village. In 1861, the road to Minnertsga was built and village expanded along the road.

The Dutch Reformed church dates from the early-16th century. In 1876 or 1877, the church was replaced, but as a copy of the previous church except for a new spire.

Tzummarum was home to 1,079 people in 1840. Het Wapen van Barradeel was the former town hall and pub. It is a neoclassic building constructed around 1860 and served as a town hall until 1903. A railway station was located in Tzummarum between 1902 and 1936.

In 1991, the Muntschat Tzummarum, a hoard containing c. 2,800 silver coins dating from 814 until 877, was discovered in Tzummarum. The collection is nowadays owned by De Nederlandsche Bank as part of the National Numismatic Collection.

Up to 2018, the village was part of the Franekeradeel municipality and up to 1984 it was part of the Barradeel municipality.

== Gallery ==
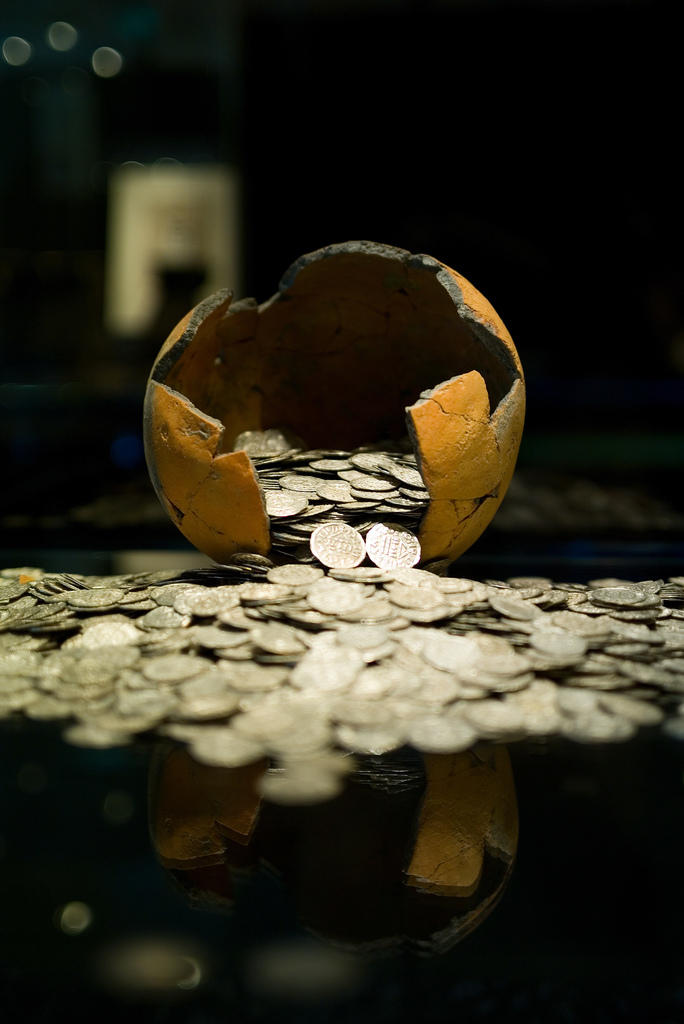
The Muntskat fan Tsjummearum
(a hoard discovered in 1991)

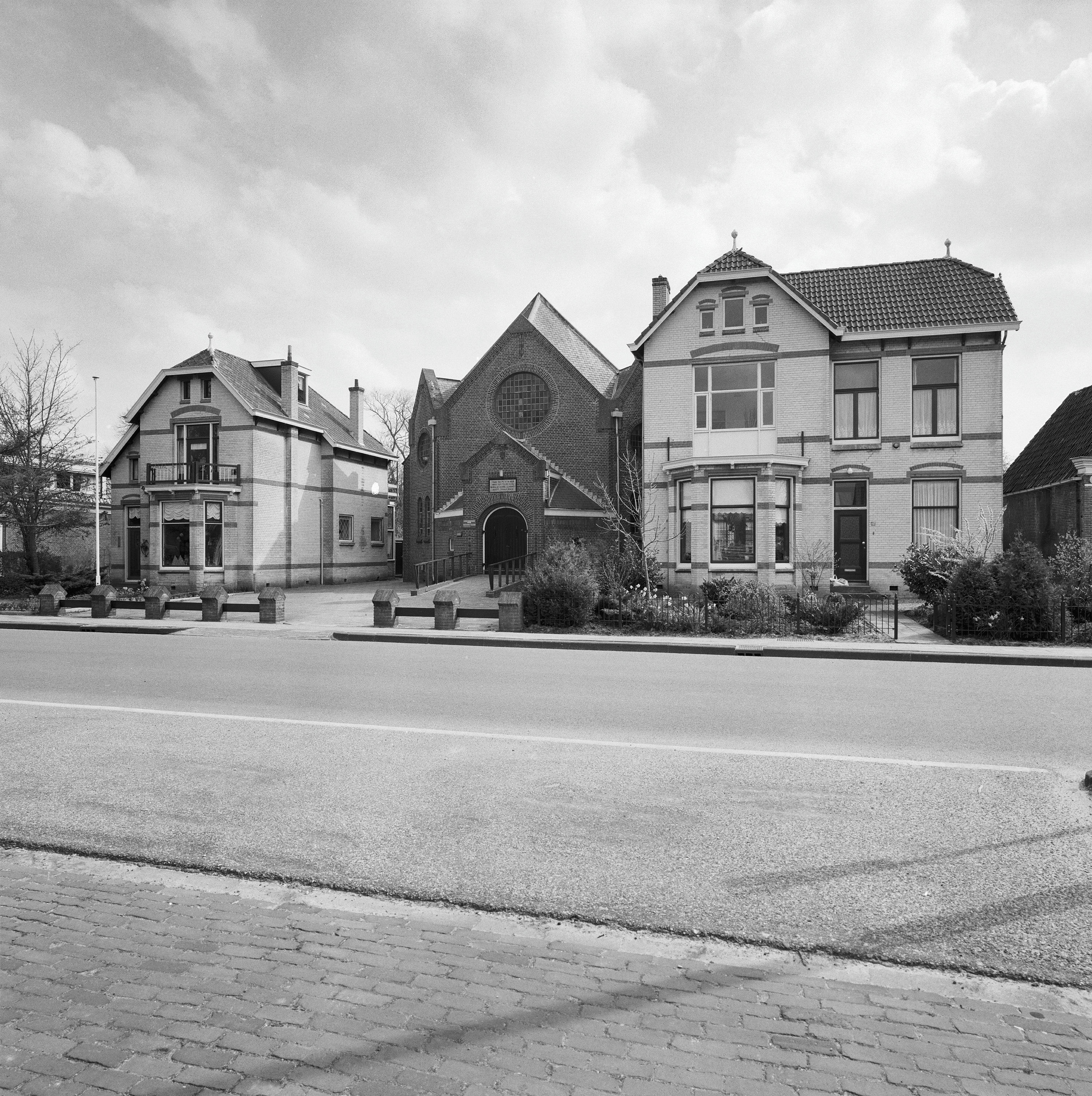
Street view

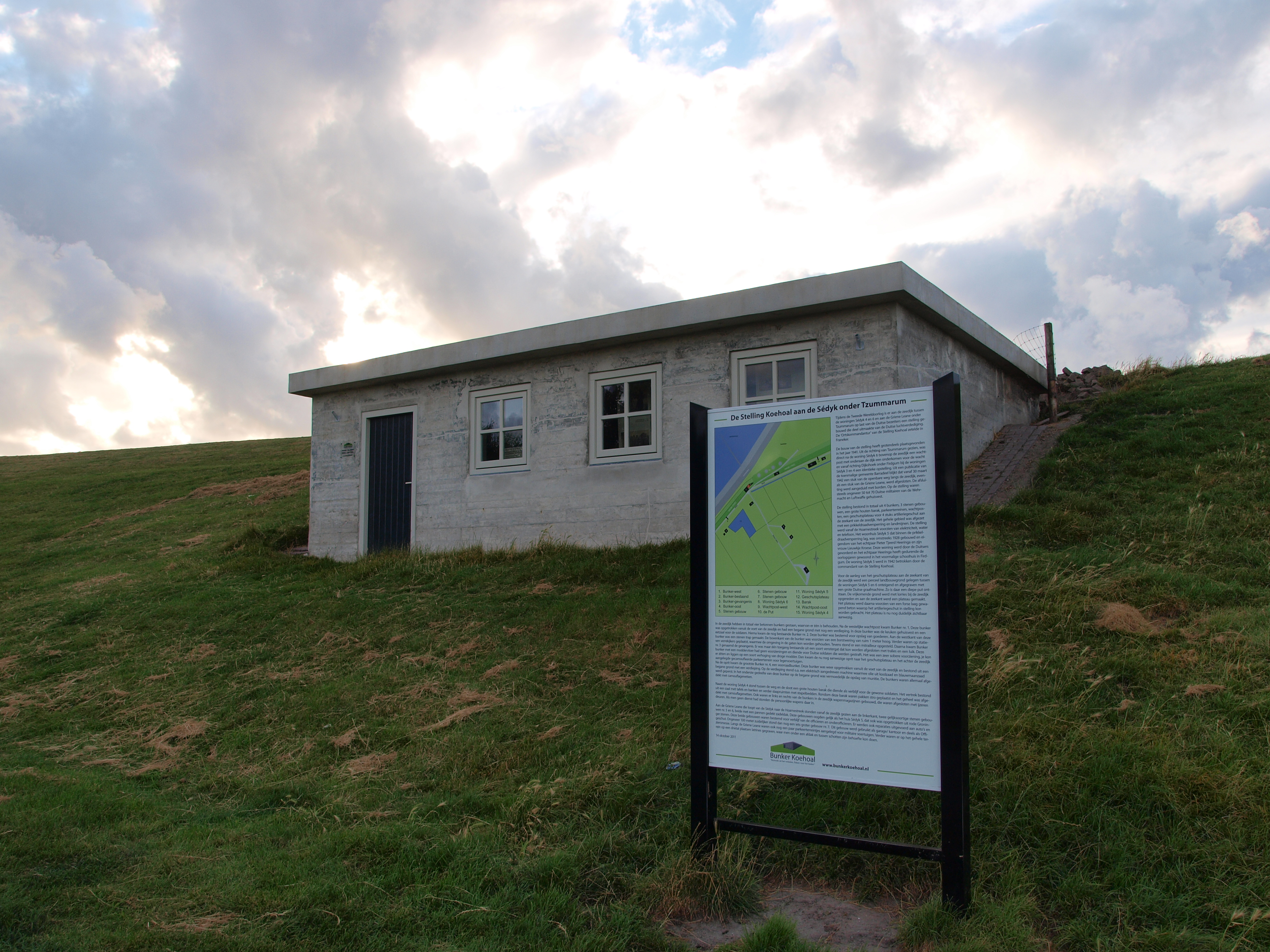
Bunker in the dike
