= Roof shingle =

Overlapping plates for covering a roof

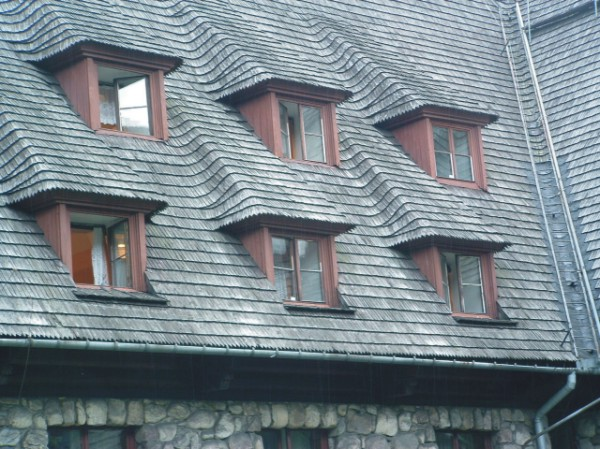
A shingle roof in Zakopane, Poland. With an area of 6000 m^{2} (1½ acres), it was one of the largest wooden shingle roofs in Europe.

Shingles are a roof covering consisting of individual overlapping elements. These elements are typically flat, rectangular shapes laid in courses from the bottom edge of the roof up, with each successive course overlapping the joints below. Shingles are held by the roof rafters and are made of various materials such as wood, slate, flagstone, metal, plastic, and composite materials such as fibre cement and asphalt shingles. Ceramic roof tiles, which still dominate in Europe and some parts of Asia, are still usually called tiles. Roof shingles may deteriorate faster and need to repel more water than wall shingles. They are a very common roofing material in the United States.

== Etymology and nomenclature ==
Shingle is a corruption of German Schindel meaning a roofing slate. Shingles historically were called tiles, and shingle was a term applied to wood shingles, as is still mostly the case outside the US.

Shingles are laid in courses, usually with each shingle offset from its neighbors. The first course is the starter course and the last being a ridge course or ridge slates for a slate roof. The ridge is often covered with a ridge cap, board, piece, or roll, sometimes with a special ridge vent material.

== Overview ==
Roof shingles are almost always highly visible and so are an important aspect of a building's aesthetics in patterns, textures and colors. Roof shingles, like other building materials on vernacular buildings, are typically of a material locally available. The type of shingle is taken into account before construction because the material affects the roof pitch and construction method: Some shingles can be installed on lath where others need solid sheathing (sheeting) on the roof deck. All shingle roofs are installed from the bottom upward beginning with a starter course and the edge seams offset to avoid leaks. Many shingle installations benefit from being placed on top of an underlayment material such as asphalt felt paper to prevent leaks even from wind driven rain and snow and ice dams in cold climates. At the ridge the shingles on one side of the roof simply extend past the ridge or there is a ridge cap consisting of boards, copper, or lead sheeting. An asphalt shingle roof has flexible asphalt shingles as the ridge cap. Some roof shingles are non-combustible or have a better fire rating than others which influence their use, some building codes do not allow the use of shingles with less than a class-A fire rating to be used on some types of buildings. Due to increased fire hazard, wood shingles and organic-based asphalt shingles have become less common than fiberglass-based asphalt shingles. No shingles are water-tight so the minimum recommended roof pitch is 4:12 without additional underlayment materials.

== Asphalt shingles ==
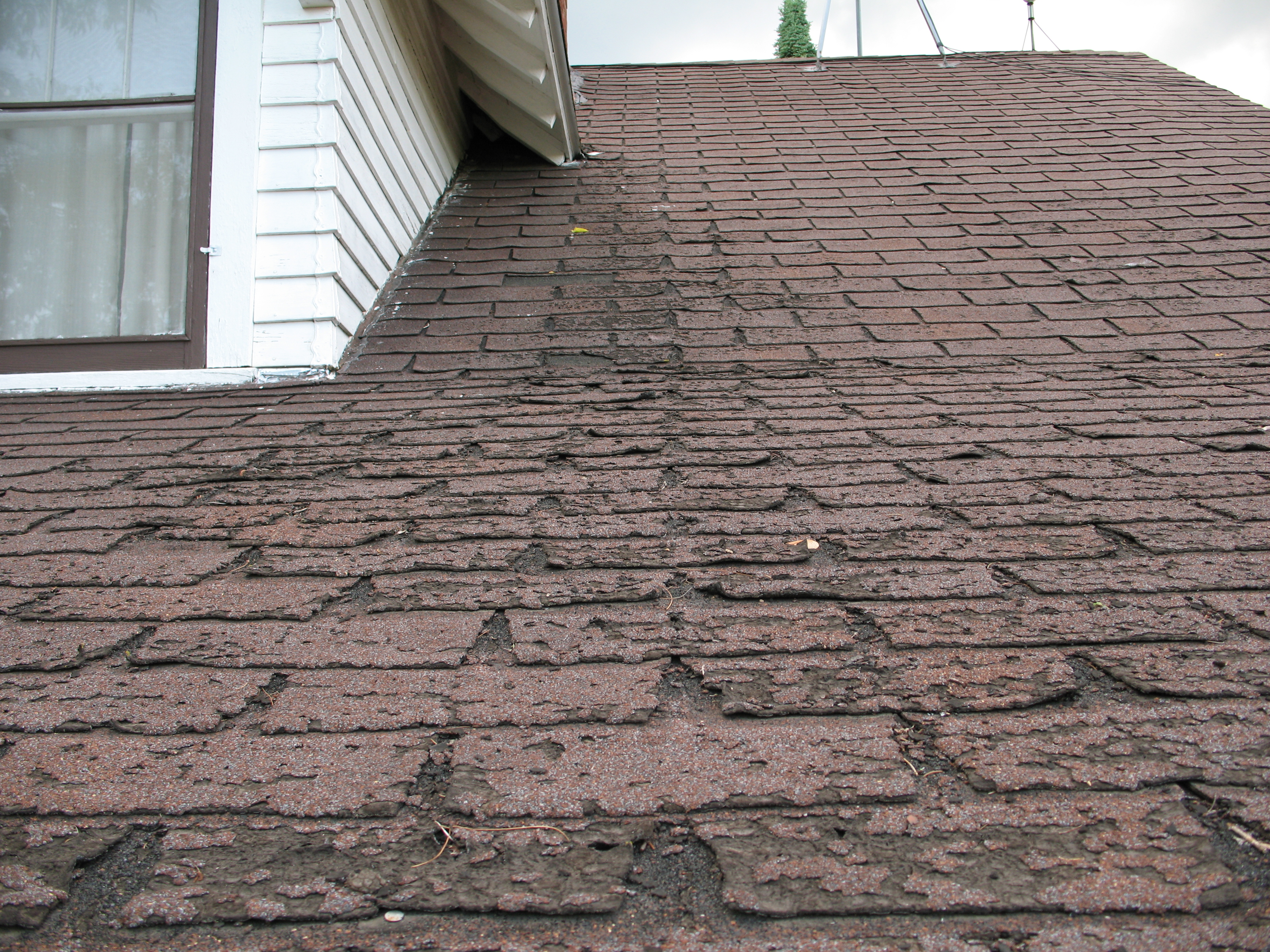
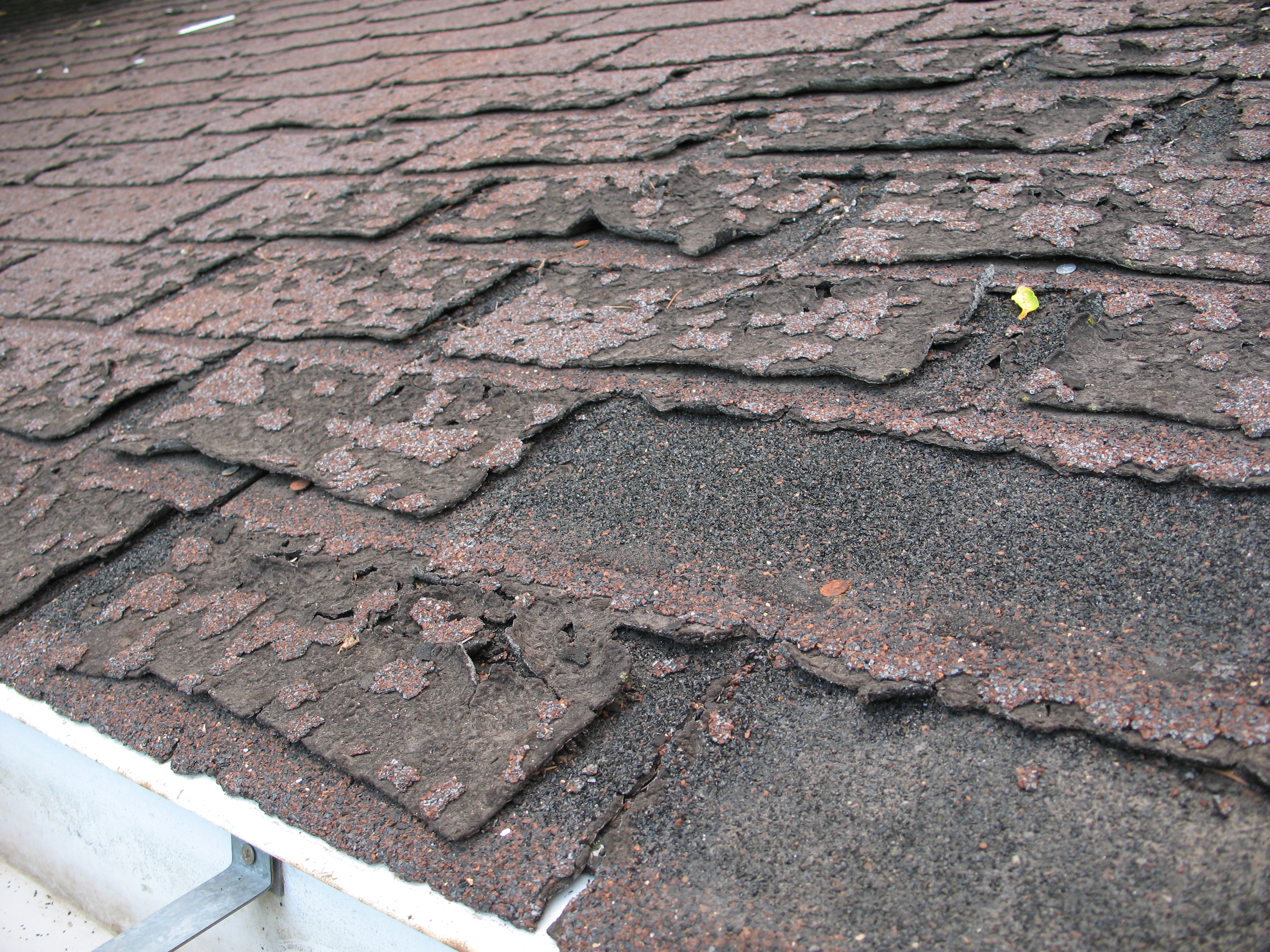
Left: Example of faster asphalt shingle wear along eaves due to channeled water running down the roof. Right: Severe shrinkage resulting in tearing away of entire tabs. Note the exposed nail heads. Water running down the roof can seep around the nails into the interior space.

In the United States, fiberglass-based asphalt shingles are by far the most common roofing material used for residential roofing applications. In Europe, they are called bitumen roof shingles or tile strips, and are much less common. They are easy to install, relatively affordable, last 20 to 60 years, and are recyclable in some areas. Asphalt shingles come in numerous styles and colors.

The protective nature of paper and fiberglass asphalt shingles primarily comes from the long-chain petroleum hydrocarbons, while wood shingles are protected by natural oils in the cellulose structure. Over time in the hot sun, these oils soften, and when rain falls, the oils are gradually washed out of the shingles. During rain, more water is channeled along eaves and complex rooflines, and these are subsequently more prone to erosion than other areas.

Eventually, the loss of the oils causes asphalt shingle fibers to shrink and wood shingles to rot, exposing the nail heads under the shingles. Once the nail heads are exposed, water running down the roof can seep into the building around the nail shank, resulting in rotting of underlying roof building materials and causing moisture damage to ceilings and paint inside.

== Wood shingles ==
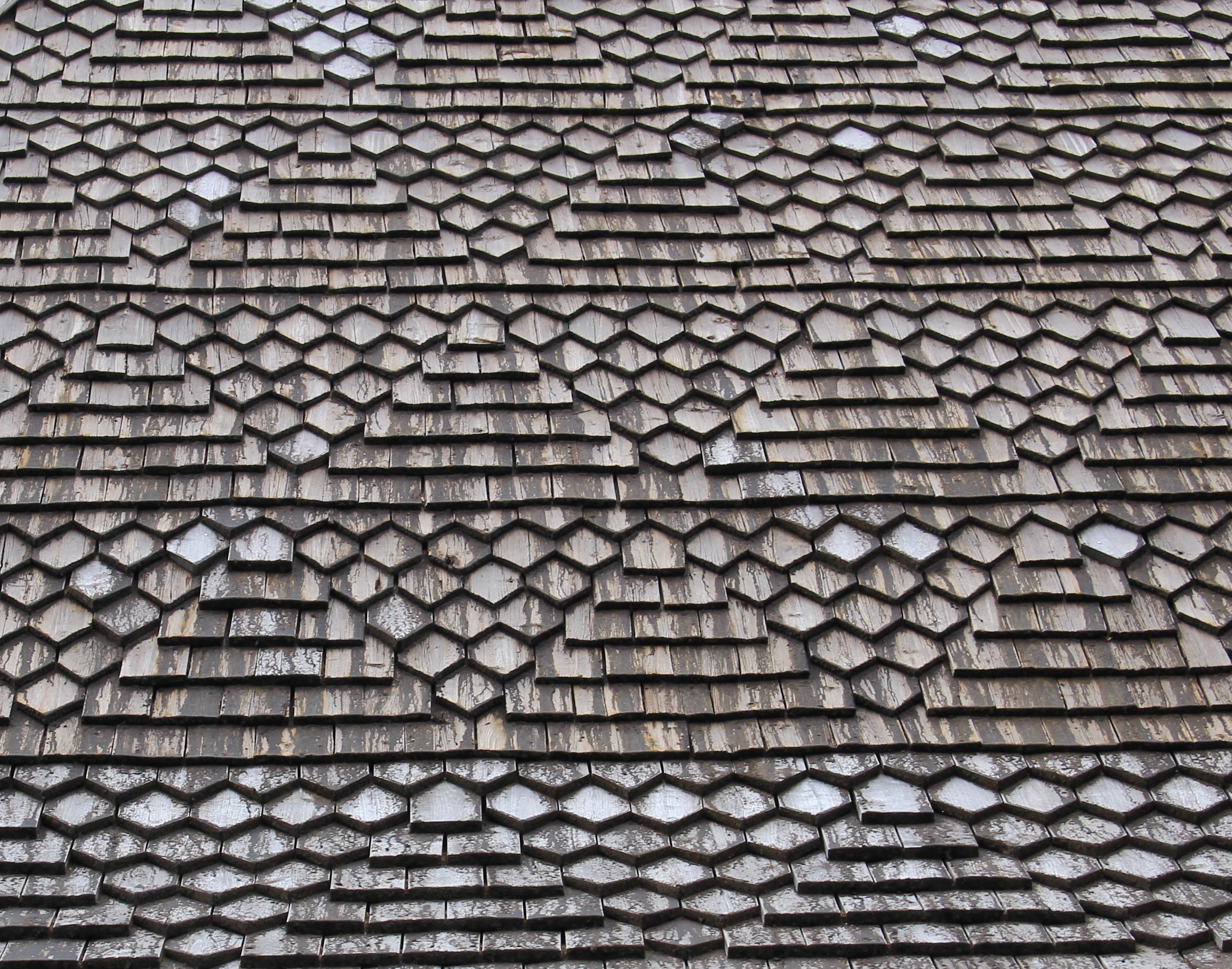
Heinola Rural Parish church, in Heinola, Finland. It was completed in 1755 and was most likely built by August Sorsa. Close-up of the wooden shingle roof. The patterning is said to originate from Islamic architecture.

Two basic types of wood shingles are called shingles and shakes. Wood shakes are typically longer and thicker than wood shingles. The main difference is in how they are made, with shingles always being sawn and shakes normally being split, at least on one side. A wood shake is often more textured, as it is split following the natural grain of the wood rather than sawn against it like the shingle. Untreated wood shingles and shakes have long been known as a fire hazard and have been banned in various places, particularly in urban areas where exterior, combustible building materials contribute to devastating fires known as conflagrations. Modern pressure-impregnated fire retardant treated wood shakes and shingles can achieve a Class B fire rating, and can achieve a Class A rating when used in conjunction with specially designed roof assemblies.

The use of wooden roof shingles has existed in parts of the world with a long tradition of wooden buildings, especially Scandinavia, and Central and Eastern Europe. Nearly all the houses and buildings in colonial Chiloé were built with wood, and roof shingles were extensively employed in Chilota architecture.

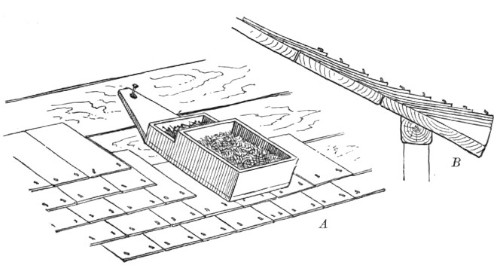
Japanese roof with shingles partly laid and the nail box.

== Stone shingles ==
Slate shingles are also called slate tiles, the usual name outside the US. Slate roof shingles are relatively expensive to install but can last 80 to 400 years, depending on the quality of the slate used and how well they are maintained. The material itself deteriorates only slowly and may be recycled from one building to another.

The primary means of failure in a slate roof is when individual slates lose their peg attachment and begin to slide out of place. This can open up small gaps above each slate. A secondary mode of failure is when the slates themselves begin to break up. The lower parts of a slate may break loose, giving a gap below the slate. Commonly, the small and stressed area above the nail hole may fail, allowing the slate to slip as before. In the worst cases, a slate may simply break in half and be lost altogether. A common repair to slate roofs is to apply 'torching', a mortar fillet underneath the slates, attaching them to the battens. This may apply as either a repair, to hold slipping slates, or pre-emptively on construction.

Where slates are particularly heavy, the roof may begin to split apart along the roofline. This usually follows rot developing and weakening the internal timbers, often as a result of poor ventilation within the roof space. An important aspect of slate roofs is the use of metal flashing, which will last as long as the slates. Slate shingles may be cut in a variety of decorative patterns and are available in several colors.

Flagstone shingles are a traditional roofing material. Some stone shingles are fastened in place, but some simply are held by gravity, so the roof pitch cannot be too steep, or the stones will slide off the roof. Sandstone has also been used to make shingles.

=== Gallery of stone shingles ===
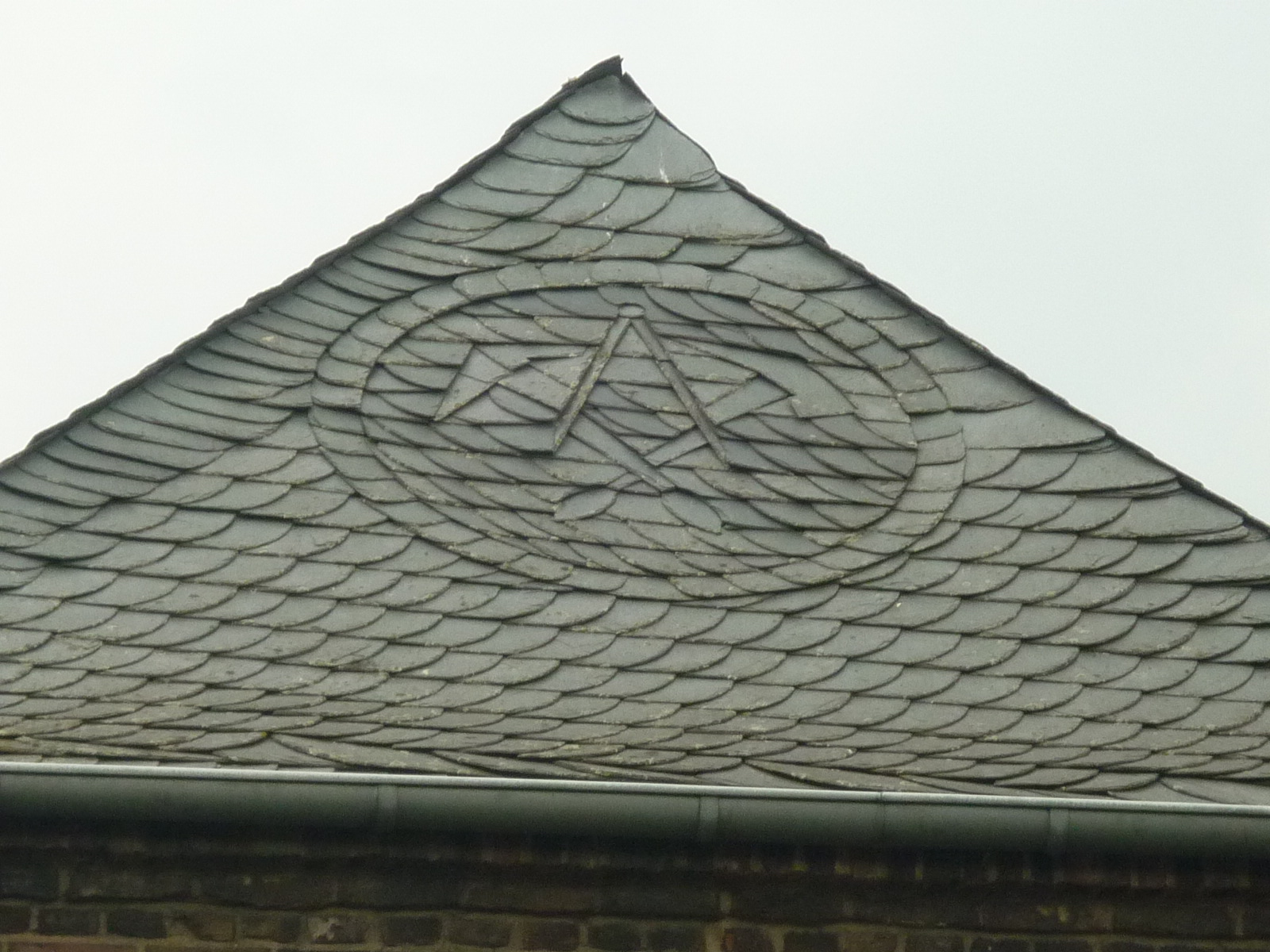
Slate roofers guild emblem as an ornament made with slate roof shingles, Meerbusch, Germany. Note the hip shingles act as a ridge cap.

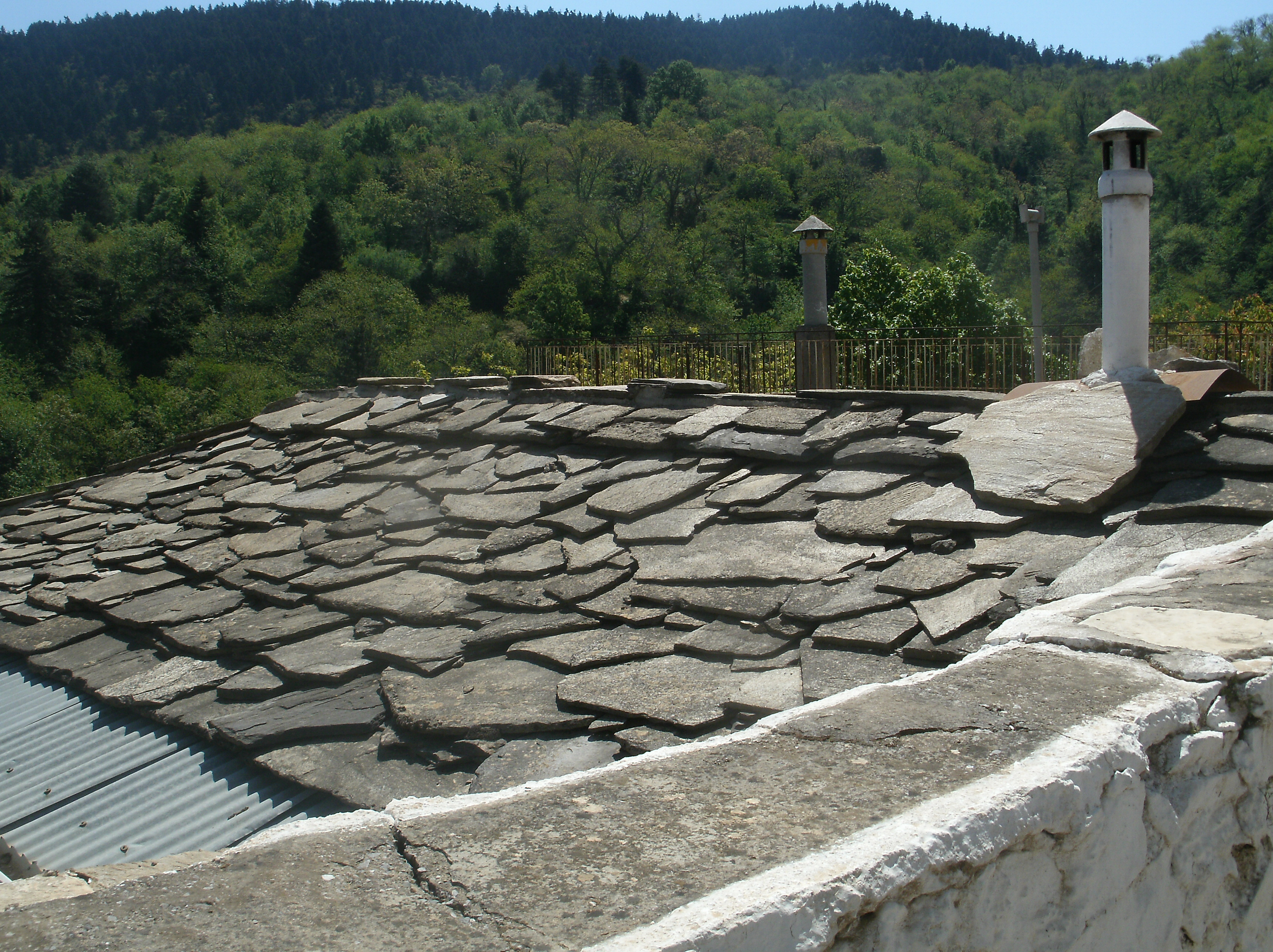
A typical flagstone roof in Kastanitsa, Greece.

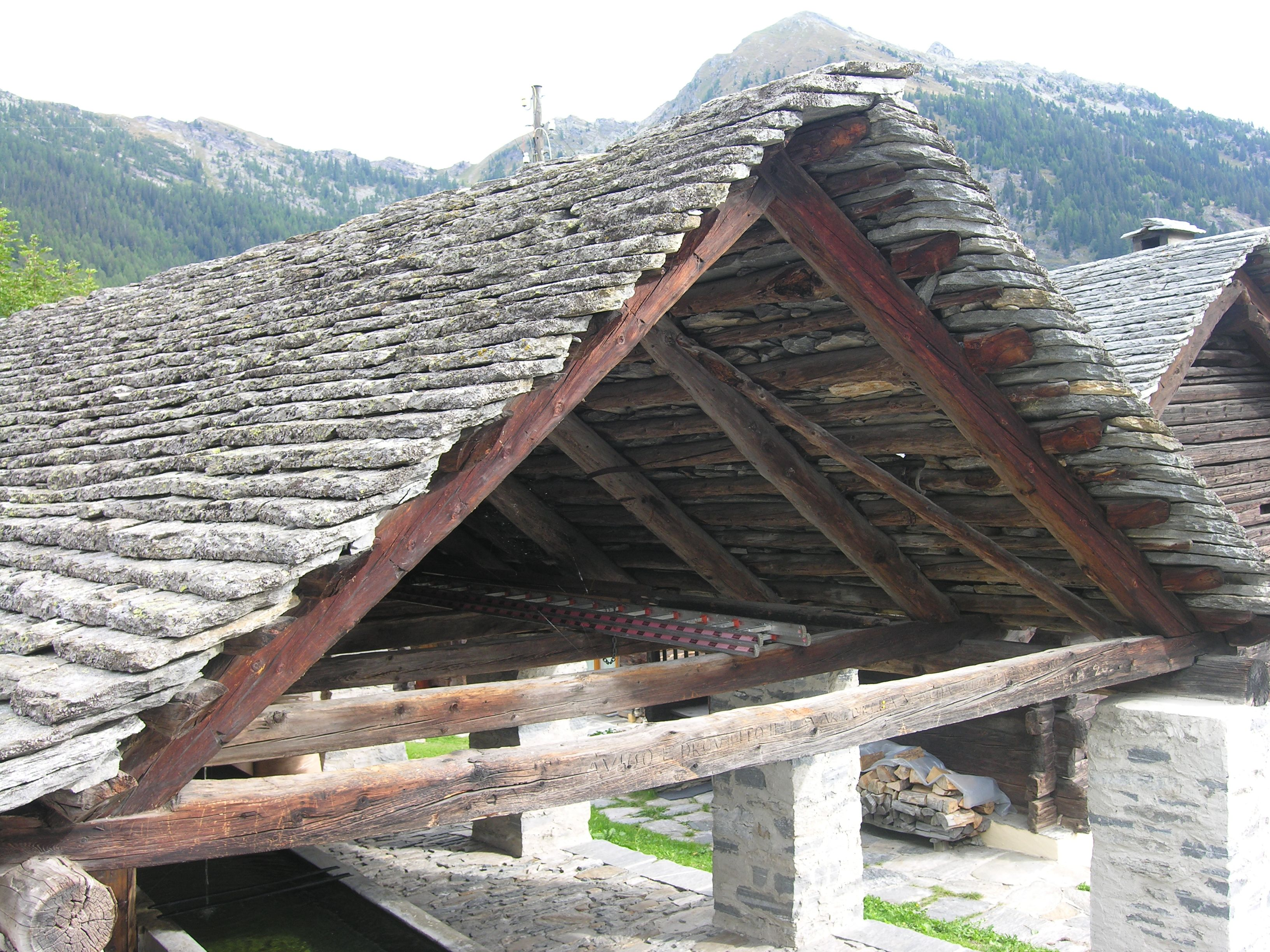
A dry laid stone roof in Switzerland

== Fibre cement shingles ==
Fibre cement shingles are often known by their manufacturer's name, such as Eternit or Transite. Often, the fiber in the cement material was asbestos, the use of which has been banned since the 1980s, for health reasons. The removal of shingles containing asbestos requires extra precautions and special disposal methods.

== Metal shingles ==
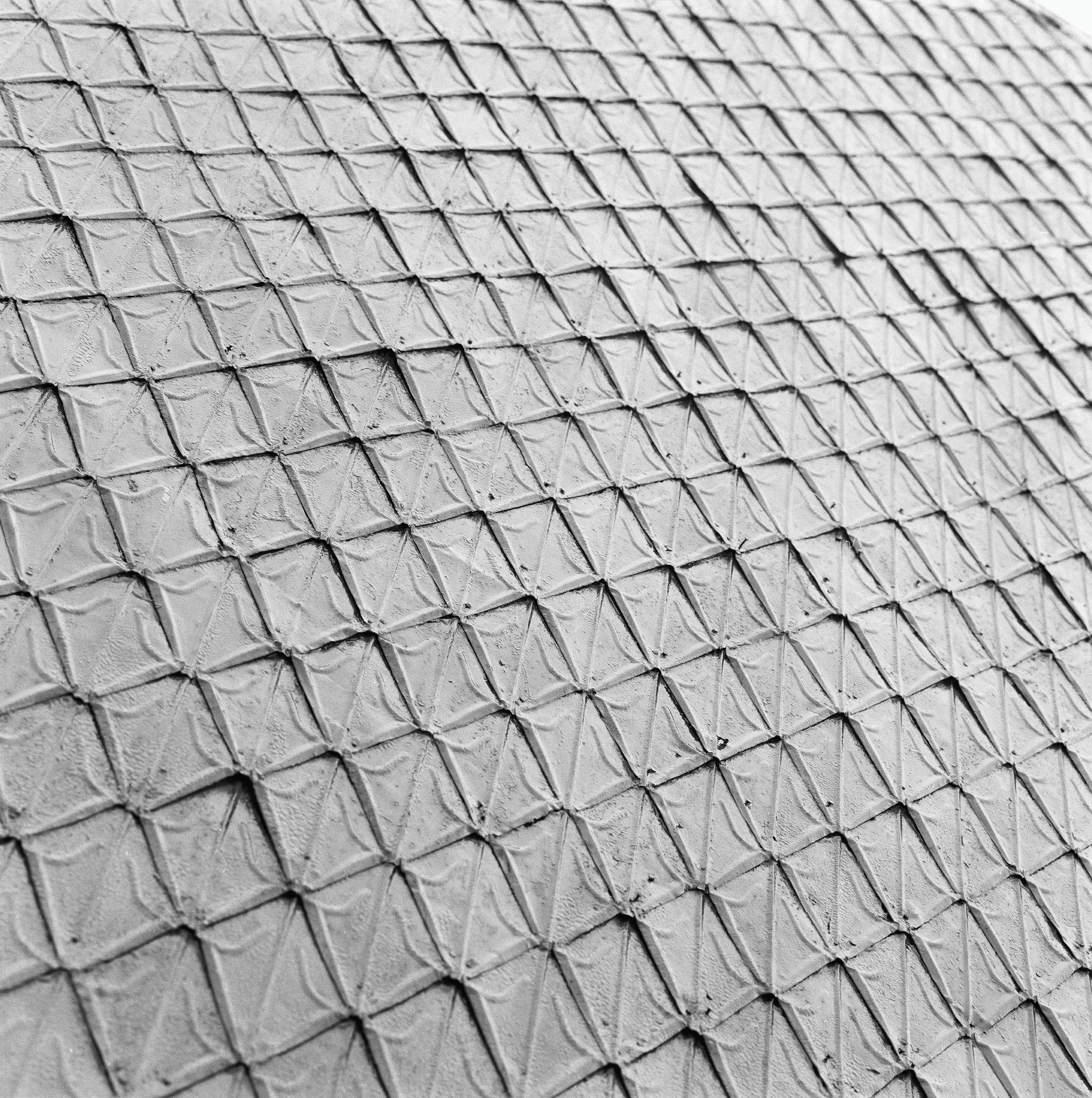
Metal shingles on St. John's Church, Tzum, Netherlands 20307447 - RCE

Metal shingles are a type of roofing material that offers the appeal of traditional shingles, such as wood, tile, and slate, while providing high fire resistance and durability. They are crafted from durable heavy-gauge aluminum and designed to emulate the classic appearance of traditional slate, cedar shingles, and other materials. Metal shingles are extremely fire resistant, so are used in fire prone areas.

== Plastic shingles ==
Plastic has been used to produce imitation slate shingles. These are lightweight and durable, but combustible. Also, they are very lightweight and are one of the cheapest shingles to have installed.

== Cedar shingles ==
Cedar shingles are resistant to rot and commonly available in lengths of 18 and 24 inches (460 and 610 mm). These fade gradually from natural wood colored to a silver-like tone. Types include hand-split resawn shakes, tapersplit shakes or tapersawn shakes.

== Composite shingles ==
Composite or synthetic shingles are a relatively new type of shingle material that are made from a blend of materials, including asphalt, fiberglass, and other polymers. These shingles are designed to mimic the look of natural materials such as wood, slate, or clay and aim to increase the durability, strength, and resistance to weather elements relative to these natural materials. Some examples of manufacturers of synthetic or composite roof shingles are DaVinci Roofscapes or Unified Steel.

== Rubber shingles ==
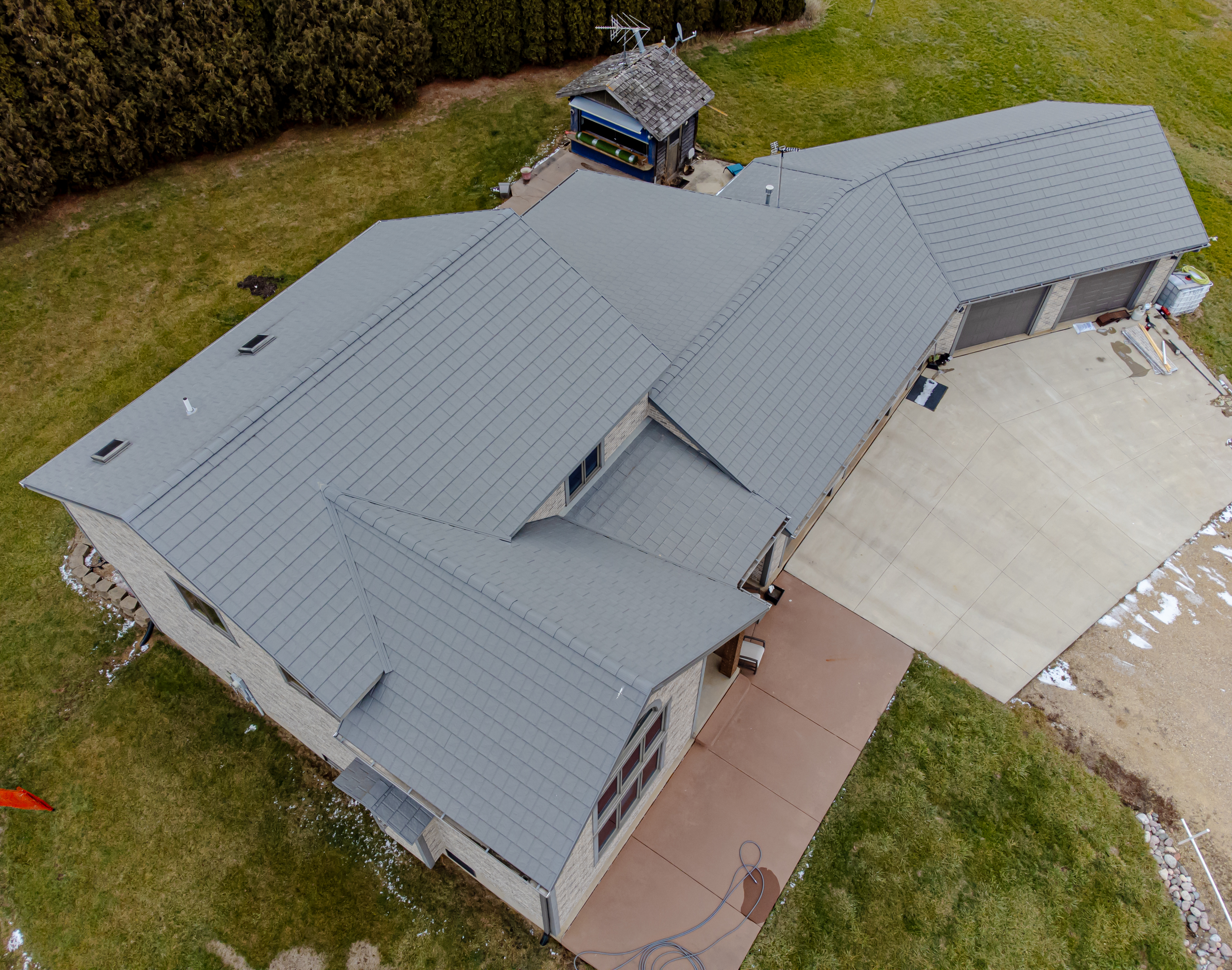
Rubber shingle roof

Rubber shingle roofs are typically made from 95% recycled material from a variety of sources including recycled tires. They last twice as long as asphalt shingles but are about twice the price as asphalt. They are more quiet than most roofs, hail resistant, and a high wind rating if there is a tongue and groove fitting at the front edge of the rubber shingle design.

== See also ==
- Roof tiles
- Metal roof
- Roof cleaning
- Shingle style
- Solar shingle
- Asphalt shingle
- Shingles
