= Tzum =

Tzum Tsjom
- Village
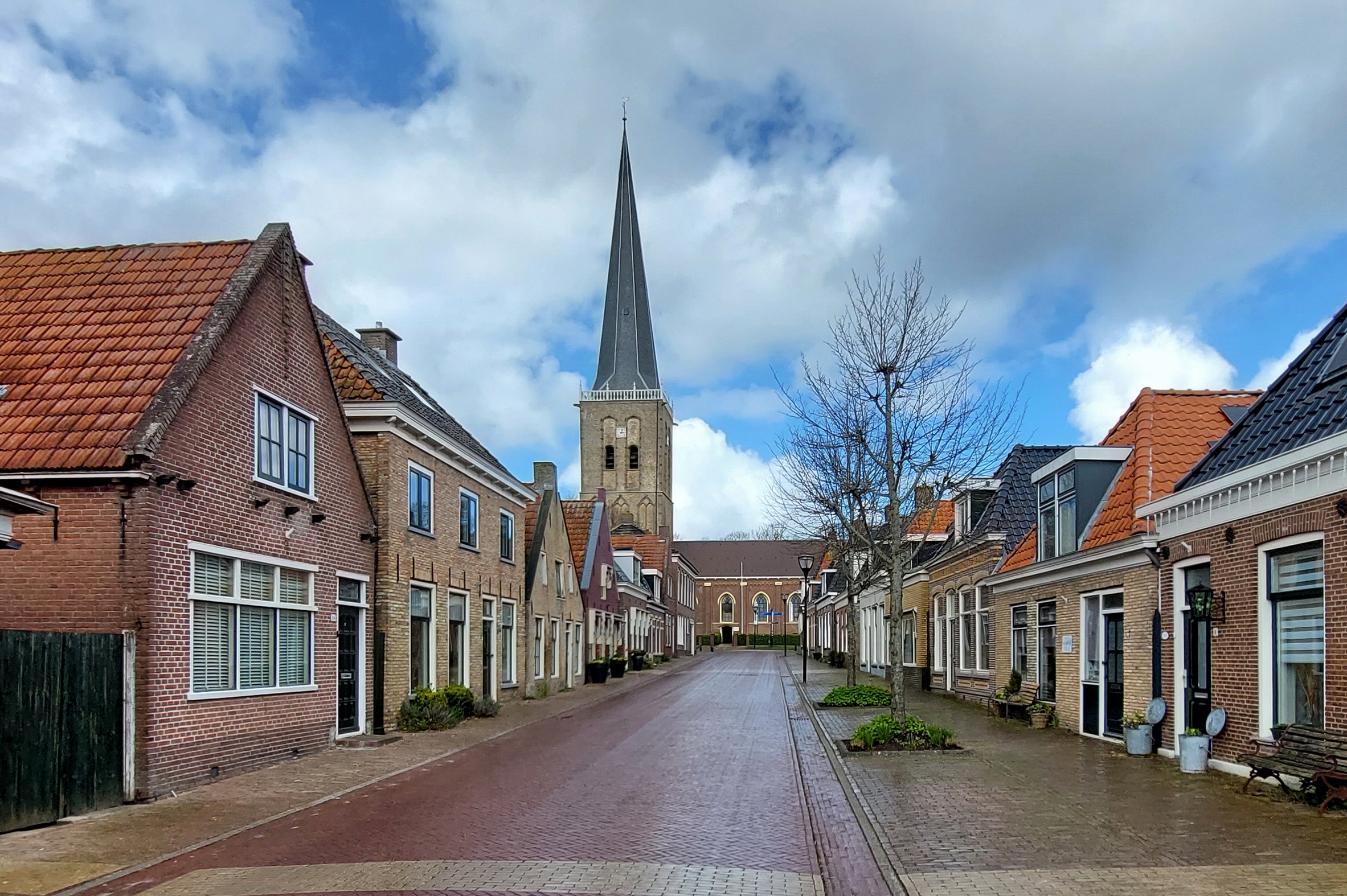
- St. John's Church, 2023

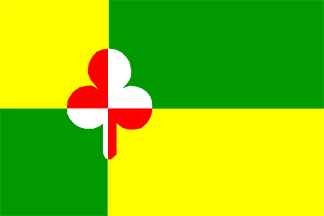
- Flag Coat of arms

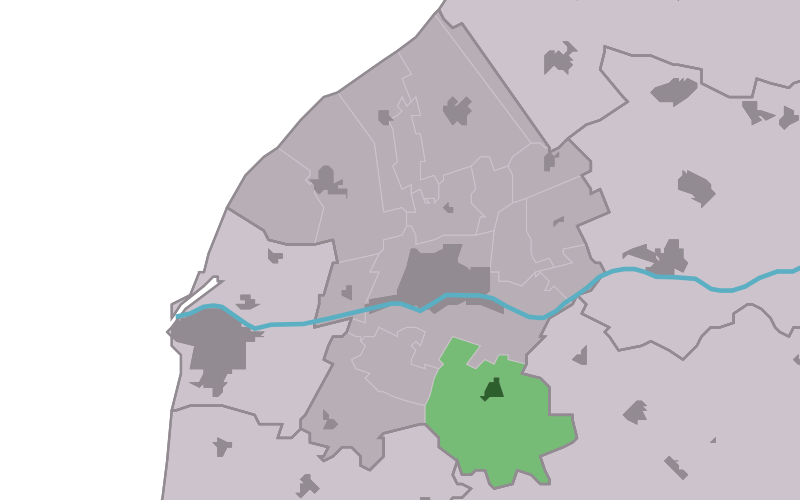
- Location in the Franekeradeel municipality

- Location in the Netherlands Tzum (Netherlands)
- Country: Netherlands
- Province: Friesland
- Municipality: Waadhoeke

Area
  - Total: 14.20 km^{2} (5.48 sq mi)
  - Land: 14.11 km^{2} (5.45 sq mi)
  - Water: 0.10 km^{2} (0.039 sq mi)
- Elevation: 0.8 m (2.6 ft)

Population (2021)
  - Total: 1,110
  - Density: 78.7/km^{2} (204/sq mi)
- Demonym: Tzummer West Frisian: Tsjommer
- Time zone: UTC+1 (CET)
  - Summer (DST): UTC+2 (CEST)
- Postal code: 8804
- Dialing code: 0517
- Website: tsjom.nl

Tzum (Dutch pronunciation: [tsʏm], West Frisian: Tsjom) is a village in Waadhoeke municipality in the province of Friesland, the Netherlands. It had a population of around 1,110 in 2023. Tzum is known for its 72-metre-tall (236 ft) church tower.

== Etymology ==
The origin of the name Tzum, which used to have different spellings, is not entirely certain. The oldest form is probably Kimminge; perhaps this was the name of the rift that flowed north of and along the salt marsh wall at Tzum. This name has been changed over time to Chzimingen (1222), Shyommengum (1275) and Zimminghum (1335). The last two show the corruption of the probable Kimmingeheem, which arose when the toponymic suffix -heem was added by the many tribes that invaded Friesland. It might also mean "settlement of Tsjumme" (a personal name).

Kim could also stand for 'edge' and Tzum was indeed on the edge of the then mainland. The corrupted spellings of Kimmingeheem were gradually merged into Kingum, which was subsequently changed by Danish influences to Tsjumgum, Tsjomgum or Ztumgum (1408). This name is known from written sources from the late Middle Ages. Eventually the suffix -gum disappeared completely.

== History ==
=== Before Christ ===
Tzum is a terp (artificial living hill) village from the beginning of our era. The development history of Tzum is believed to have begun around 600 B.C., when the first inhabitants settled where Tzum is now located. Around that time, there was a salt marsh wall in the north of the present village area of Tzum, on which, in addition to Tzum, the hamlets of Holprijp and Tallum were created as well. This salt marsh wall was also the coastline, because the Wadden Sea lay directly north of it. East of Tzum, the salt marsh wall was interrupted by a southward flowing tidal creek, which we assume was called Laak by the residents. The hamlet of Laakwerd owes its name to this (laak = 'valley' and werd = 'mound').

=== Roman Empire ===
The Roman military occupation of the village area of Tzum did not last long, but trade contracts between the Romans and northern Friesland continued for more than two centuries. An example of this is the hamlet of Tolsum's writing board, found not far from Tzum, about a negotiation between a slave named Carus and an unknown master. In addition, there was a Roman camp southeast of Tzum, on the site of the hamlet of De Kampen.

=== Middle Ages ===
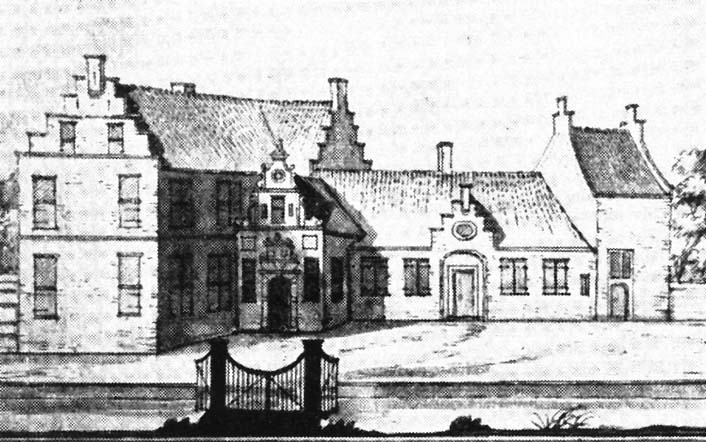
Stins Hottinga at the hamlet of Holprijp, one of the former stinsen of Tzum (drawing by J. Stellingwerff, 1723)

After the capture of northwest Friesland by Frankish troops in 734, the new rulers tried to convert the inhabitants of Tzum to Christianity. Although there was resistance to Christianization, there was probably a small church in Tzum around the year 800.

In the Middle Ages, the so-called rechtsomgang was used in Franekeradeel. This was a system in which there was a panel of eight judges, one of whom held the position of grietman. Every year, eight legal stinsen, farmers with land, were given the turn to elect judges. For this purpose, Franekeradeel was divided into four Fiarndelen (West Frisian for 'fourth parts') of two eedsgebieden ('oath areas') each, which provided a judge. The turns were also divided within the eedsgebieden. One of these Fiarndelen (with a capital letter) was the Tzumminga Fiarndel, but here surprisingly enough these judges were excluded from the grietman's choice. Tzumminga Fiarndel was in turn divided into four fiarndelen (with lower case letters):

- Tzumminga fiarndel: Tzum and the hamlets of Barrum and Laakwerd (in the west)
- Faltema fiarndel: the hamlets of Tallum, Fatum and Teetlum (in the east)
- Tritzema fiarndel: the hamlets of Tritzum, Tolsum and Koum (in the southwest)
- Rijpera fiarndel: the hamlets of Holprijp, Herum and Truurd (in the north)

=== 1500–1800 ===
In 1516, almost the entire village was burned down by the Zwarte Hoop, a group of discarded soldiers of George of Saxony. Since Tzum at that time mainly consisted of wooden houses, only some of the houses were preserved. Only residents who could afford a stone house (stins) were lucky. Some of these stinsen were Oud-Herema, Hermana and Hottinga.

The construction of the tower of the St. John's Church started on 6 June 1548 and was completed on 20 October 1549. During the Eighty Years' War, the tower was burned by Spanish troops in 1586.

In 1718 there was a mill near the harbour, probably a corn mill. In addition, all farms were now built of stone.

=== 1800–present ===
On 10 October 1816, the municipality of Tjum changed into Franekeradeel. Nevertheless, Tzum remained the main town of the municipality until 1984 when Franeker and Barradeel merged with Franekeradeel due to the municipal reorganization, making Franeker the capital.

Tzum was home to 633 people in 1840. After the agricultural crisis of 1870, unemployment increased drastically and significantly more construction took place in the village center. Population registers even mention here and there that people were housed in a stable or pigsty. The increase in population density also led to epidemics. The Housing Act of 1901 changed the appalling conditions. In 1896, a dairy factory opened in Tzum.

After the Second World War, Tzum developed into a commuter village of Franeker. Up to 2018, the village was part of the Franekeradeel municipality, until it merged into the municipality of Waadhoeke.

== Buildings ==
=== Church ===
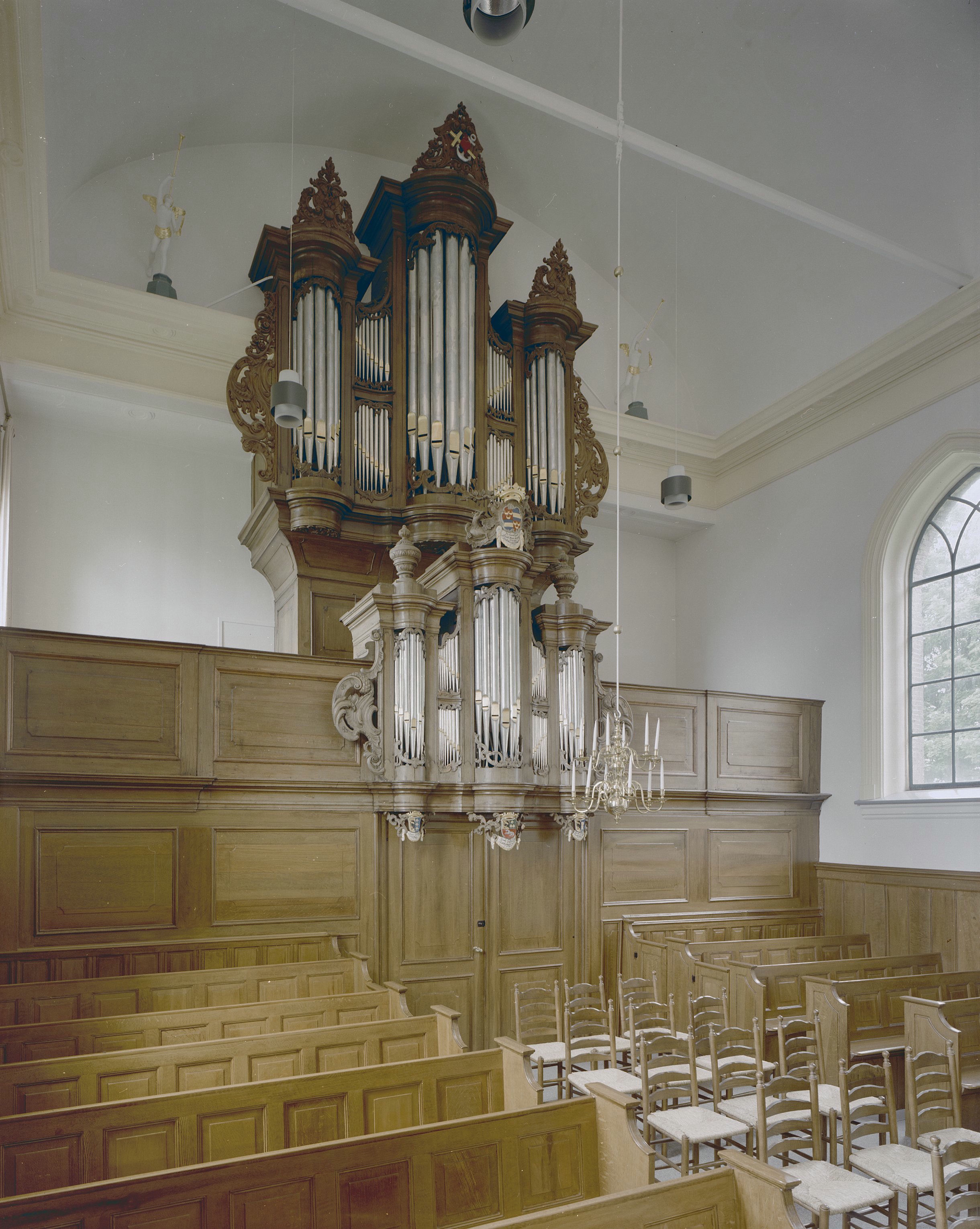
Interior of the church, with a view of the organ, built by Albertus Antonius Hinsz

The Protestant church, the St. John's Church, has a 12th-century nave with a 14th-century choir. The tower burnt down in 1547, which damaged the church severely. A new tower was built between 1548 and 1549 which took - according to legend - exactly 12 months, 12 days and 12 hours. The tower measures 72 metres (236 ft) and was the tallest church tower in Friesland until the construction of the Saint Boniface church in Leeuwarden.

Tzum has its own Protestant community that holds services in the church on Sundays.

==== The legend of the lyntsjesnijers ====
The St. John's Church is located on the fairly high and extensive mound, with a tower that stands out for miles around, which at 72 meters is the highest of all village churches in Friesland. The majority of this is due to the 41-meter-long (135 ft) spire.

According to a local legend, the residents of Oldeboorn competed with Tzum for the church with the highest tower. The Oldeboorners wanted the highest tower in Friesland, which meant that their tower had to be higher than that of Tzum. As such, two men traveled to Tzum to determine exactly how high that tower was. They climbed the tower and measured its height with a rope. Then they stayed overnight at the local inn. While they slept, the landlady cut off a large piece of the rope. The ultimate result was that the tower of Oldeboorn became lower than the tower of Tzum. The inhabitants of Oldeboorn have since been called tuorkemjitters ('tower meters') and those of Tzum lyntsjesnijers ('line cutters').

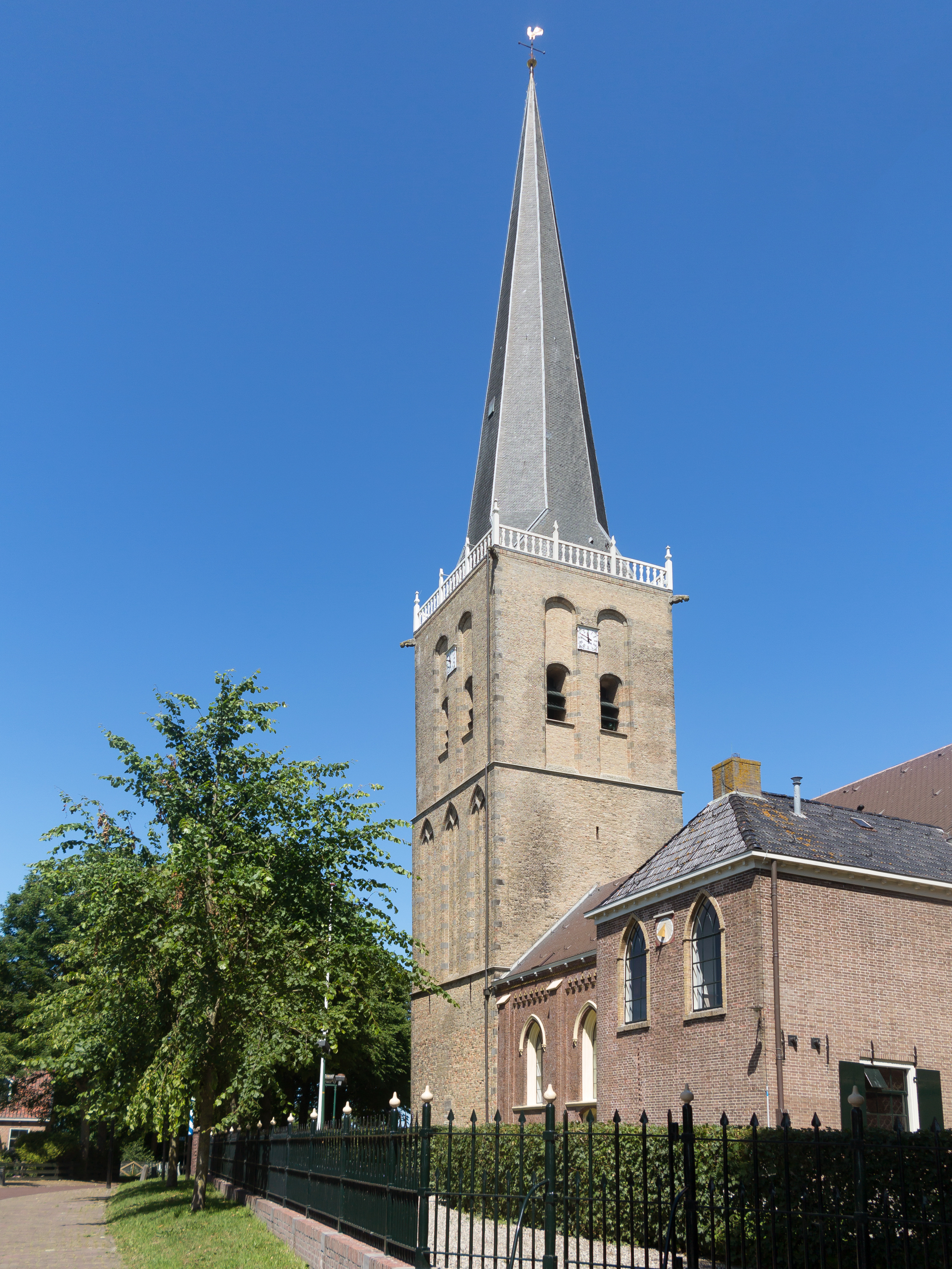
The St. John's Church in Tzum

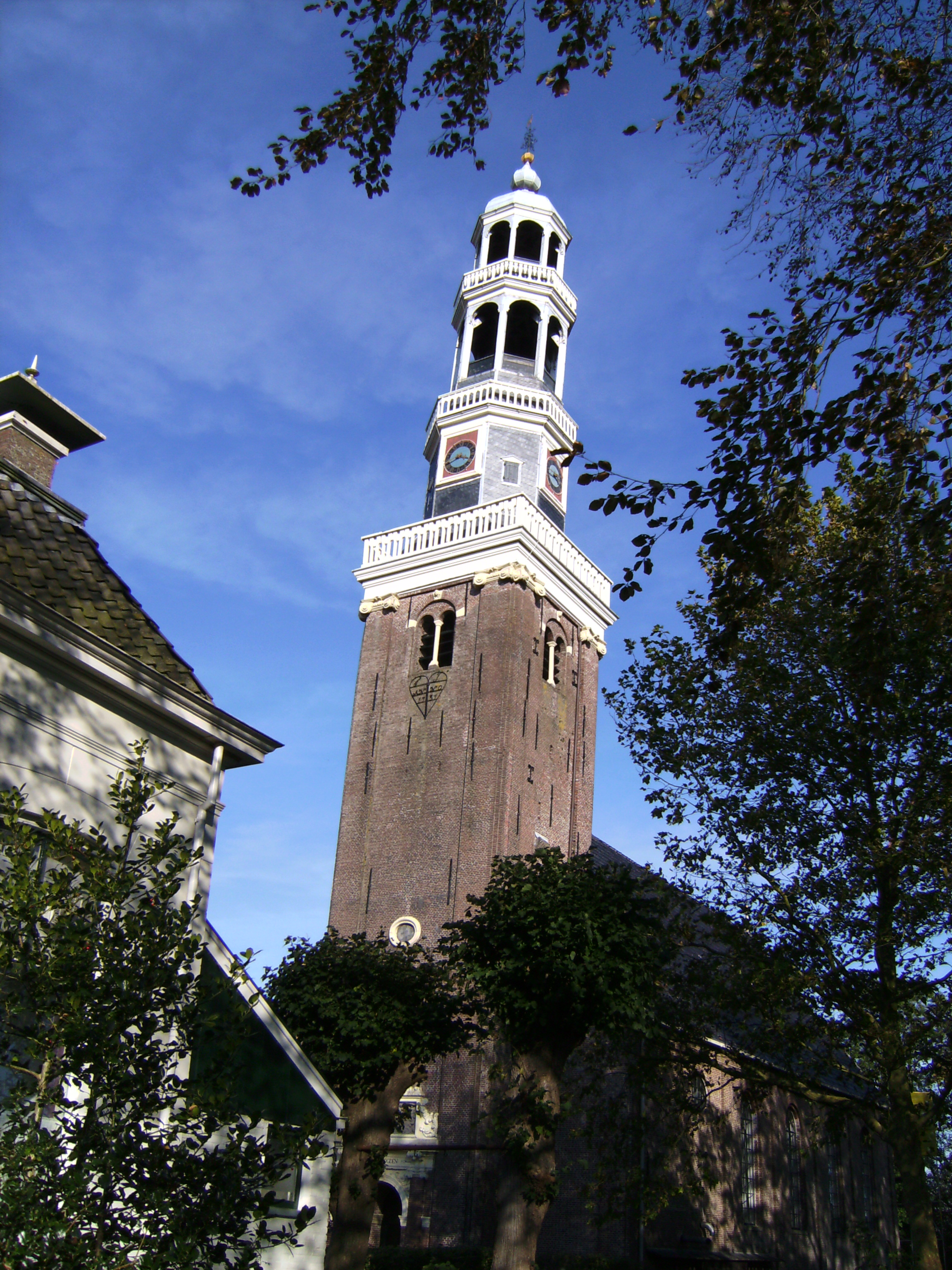
The Doelhofkerk in Oldeboorn

=== School ===
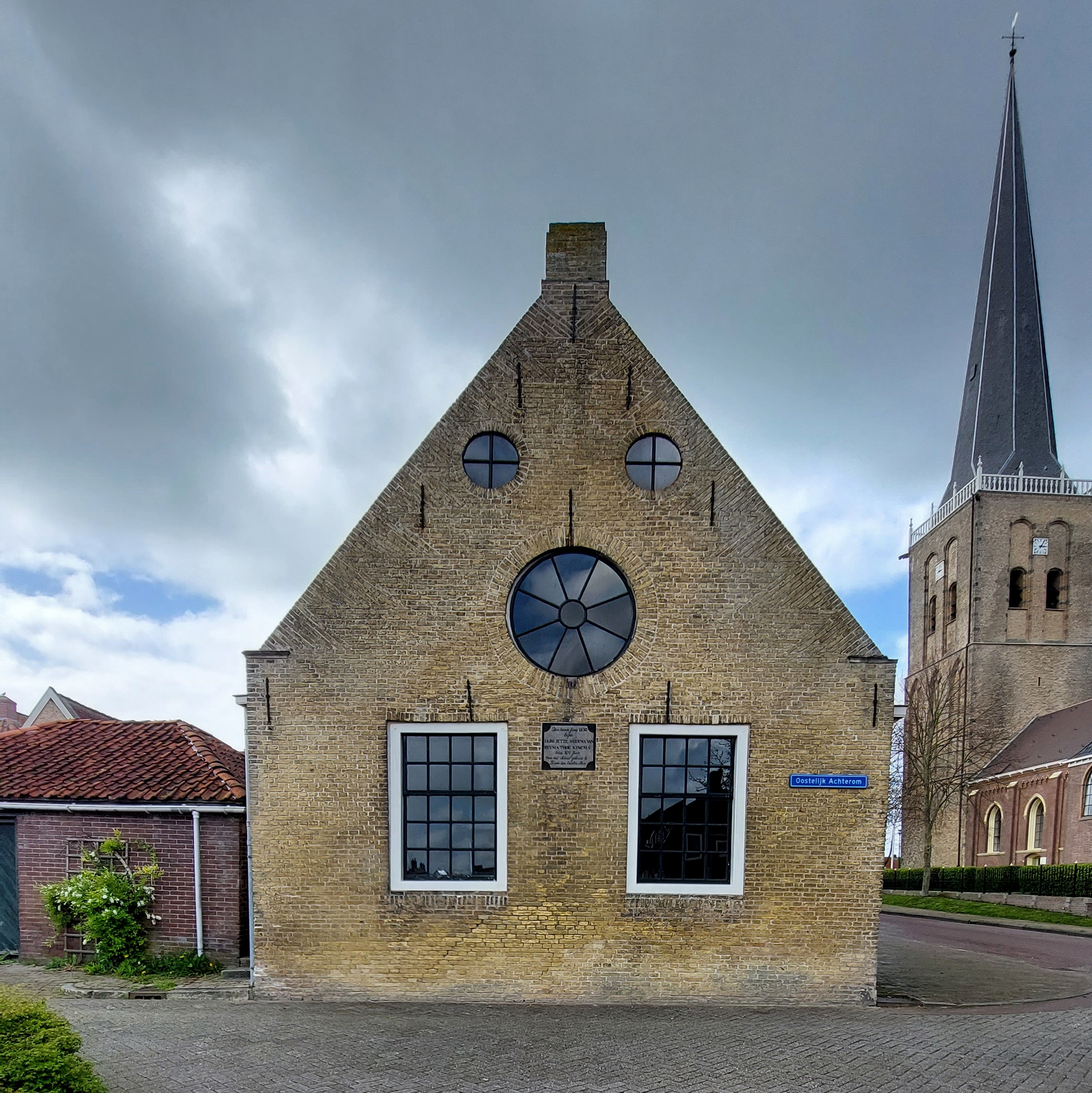
The old monumental school at the corner of Oostelijk Achterom

Tzum has a Protestant primary school, the Staetlânsskoalle.

However, the village has had several different schools over time. One of these is the monumental school on the corner of Oostelijk Achterom from 1830. In 1870, a newer, more spacious public school was built on the corner of Voorstraat, which remained in use until 1934. In 1866, another (special) school was opened on Westelijk Achterom. This remained in use until 1904 when the 'new' school next to the dairy factory was put into use. This was later demolished again to make way for the current Staetlânsskoalle.

=== Dairy factory ===
On the Fabrieksweg, in the west of Tzum, are the remains of an old dairy complex called Coöperatieve Stoomzuivelfabriek De Eensgezindheid. This complex was built in 1897, after which it received several extensions. In 1971, the factory was taken over by the cooperative dairy factory De Goede Wachting in Workum. The complex has been out of use since 1976.

=== Windmills ===
Nearby Tzum are two windmills: Fatum and Teetlum or Duivenhok.

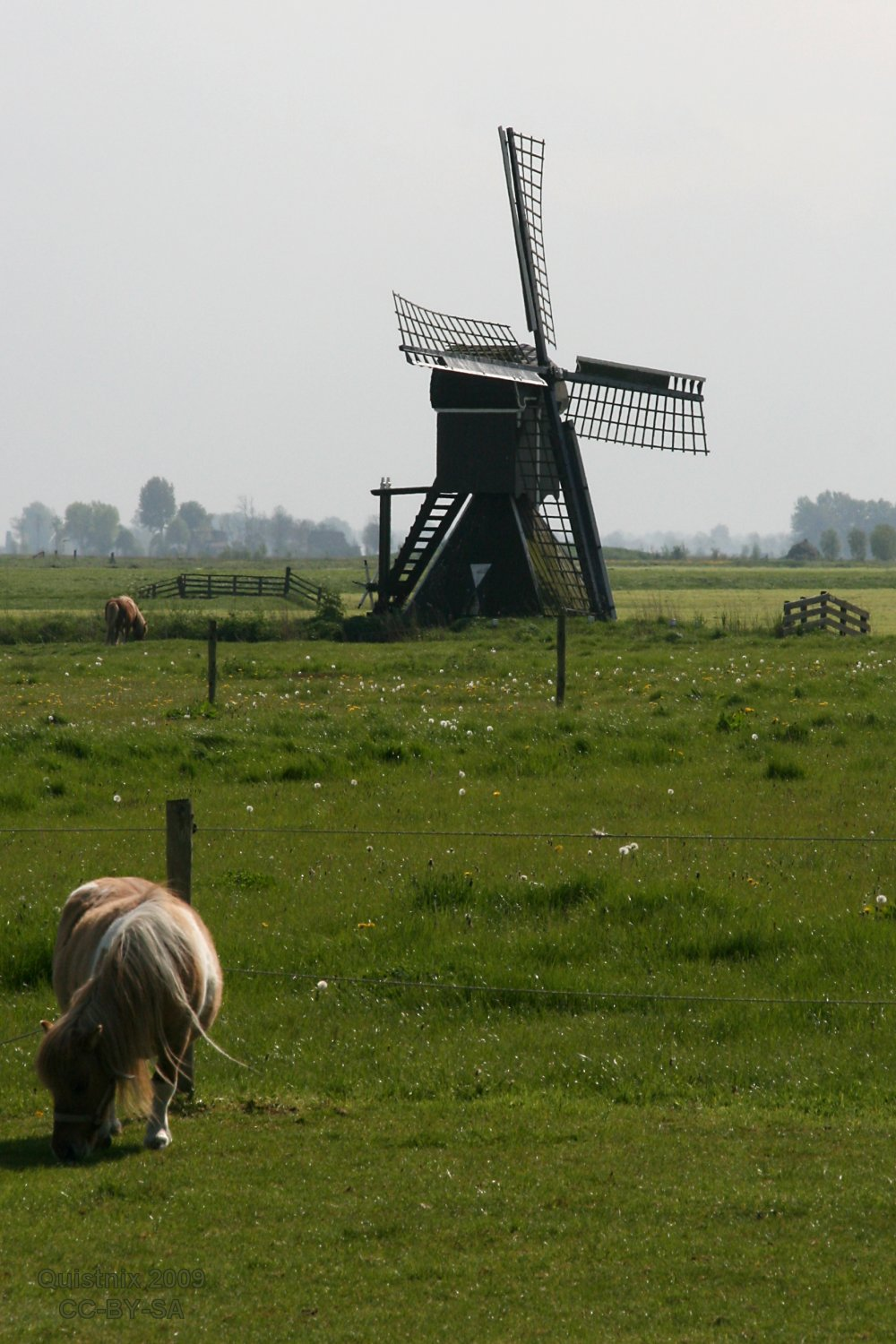
Fatum

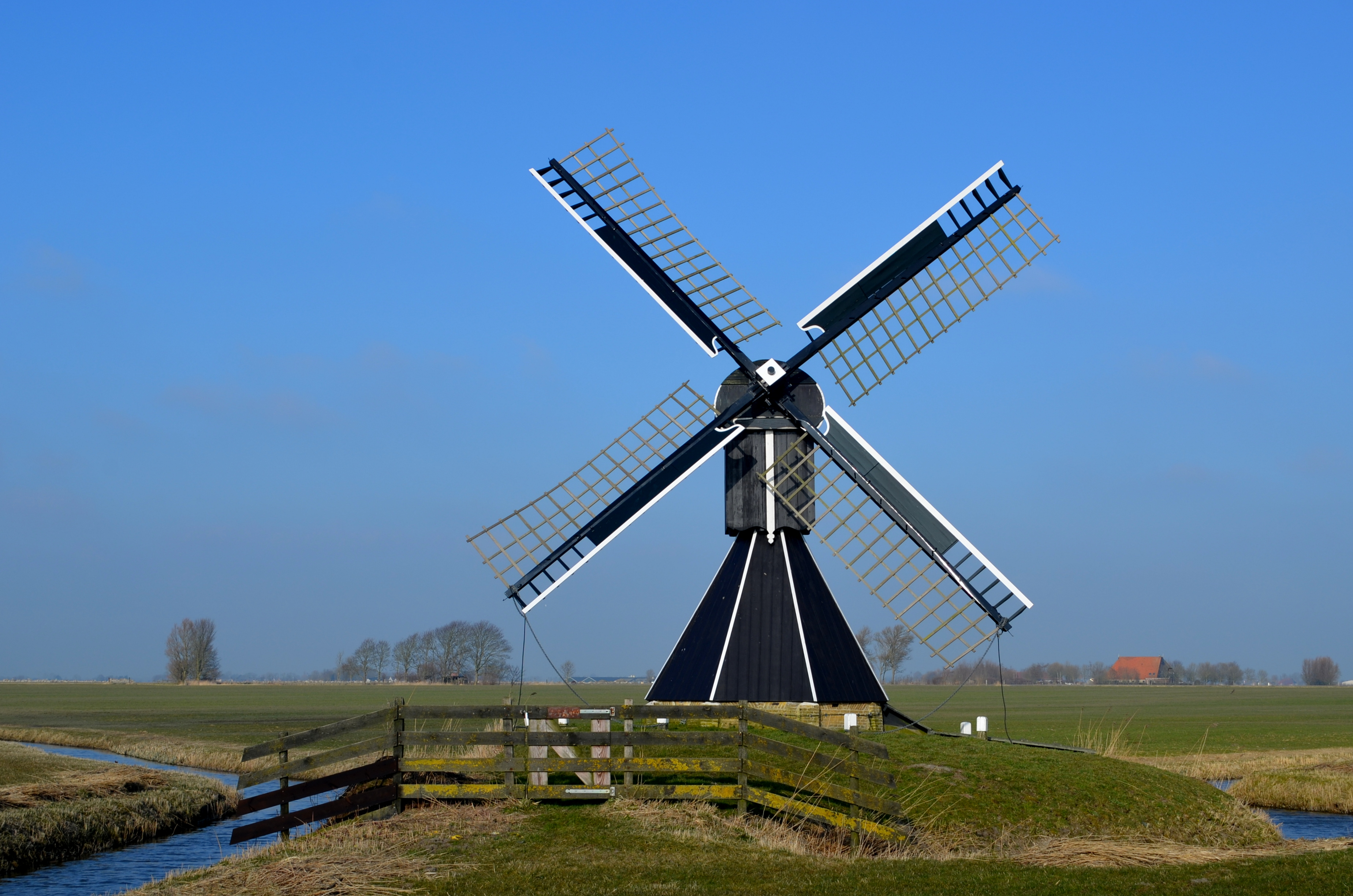
Teetlum

== Trivia ==
- The literary magazine Tzum is named after this village. Since the magazine was published by a Frisian publisher, the editors were looking for a special Frisian place name. When Sexbierum dropped out, they chose Tzum by acclamation.

== Notable people ==
- Johannes Belksma (1884–1942), missionary
- Piet Paulusma (1956–2022), weatherman
- Renier van Tzum (c. 1600–1660), opperhoofd or chief factor of the Dutch East India Company in Siam and Japan

== Gallery ==
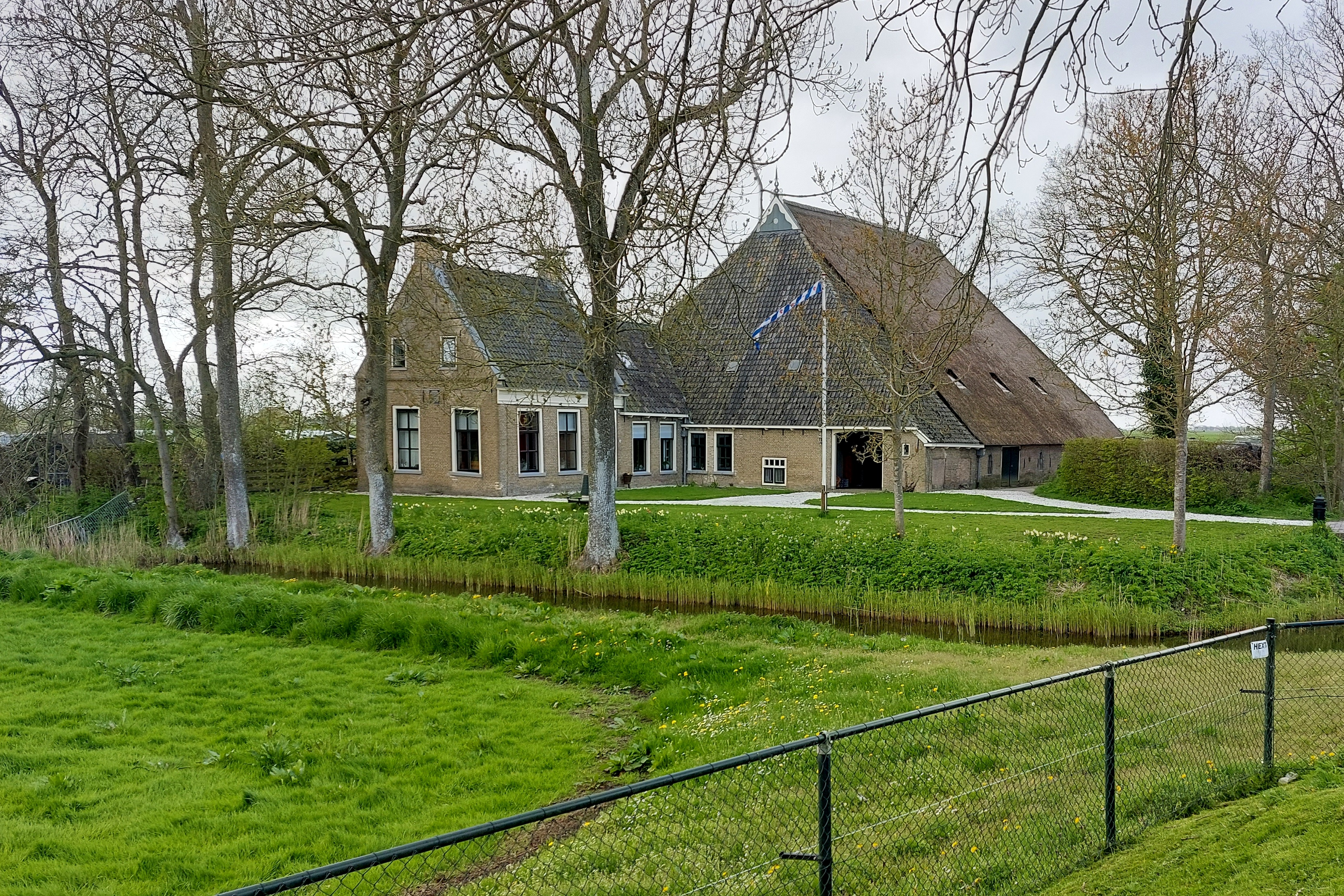
Nij Herema

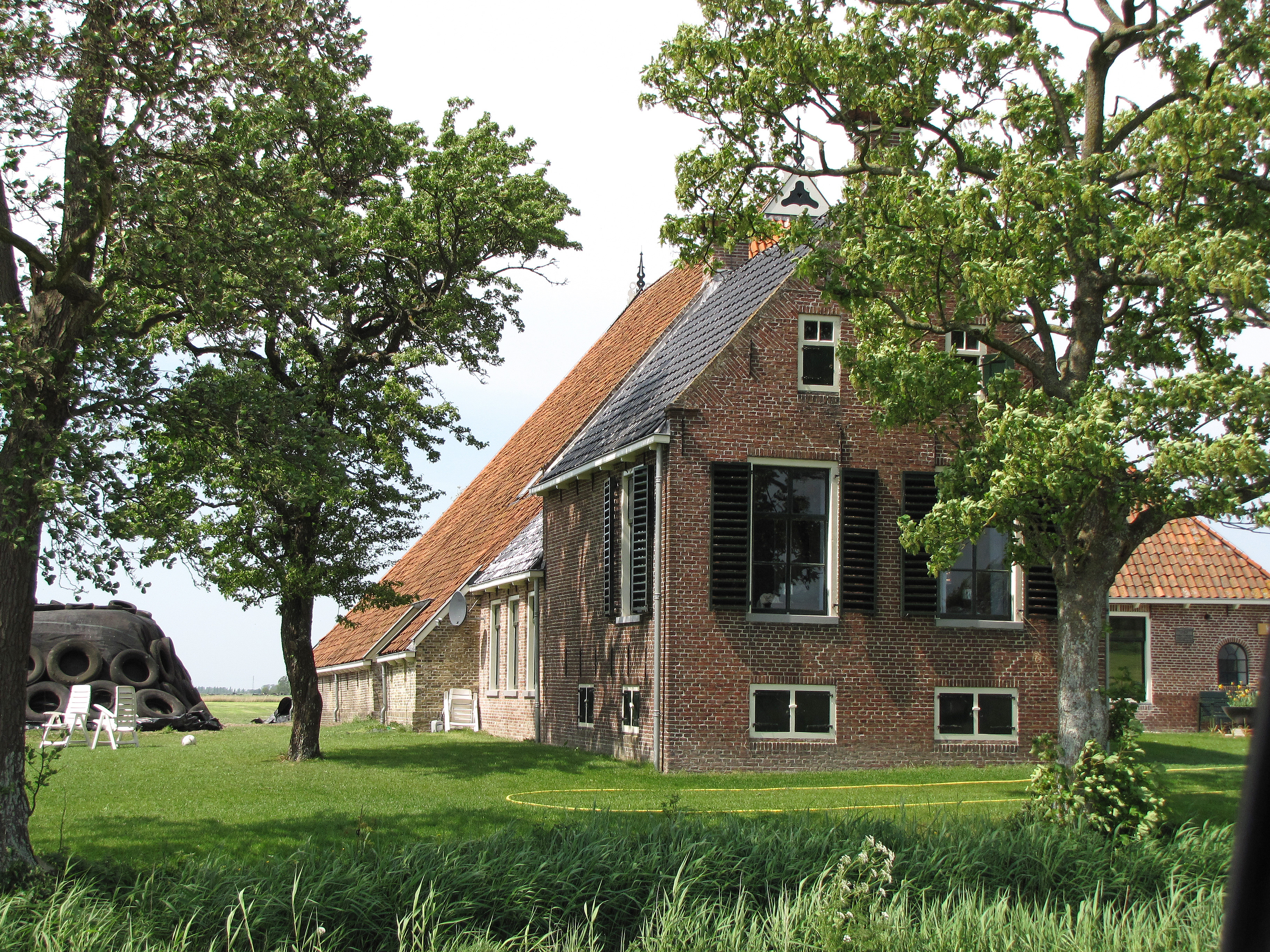
Farm in Tzum

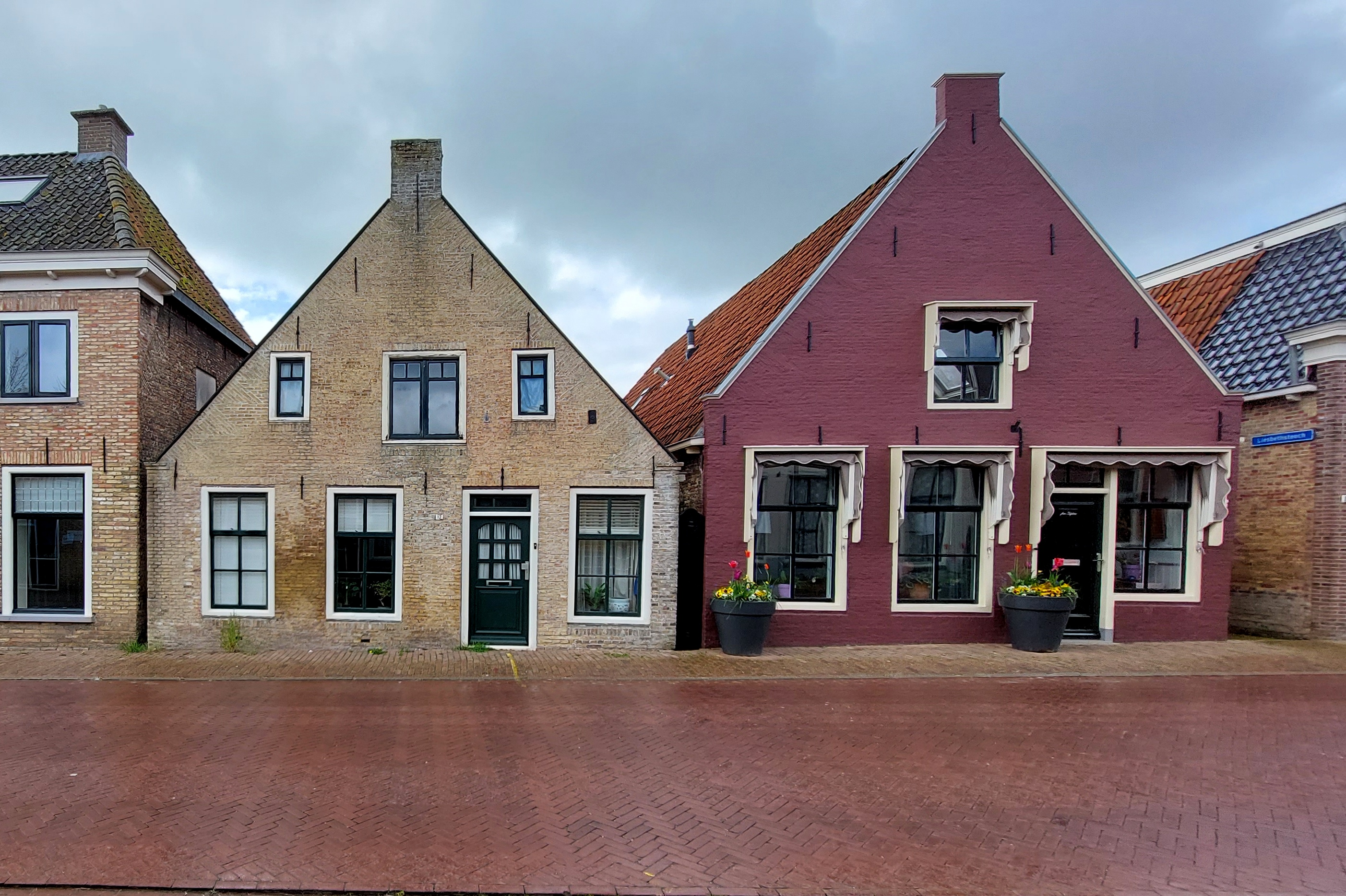
Houses in Tzum

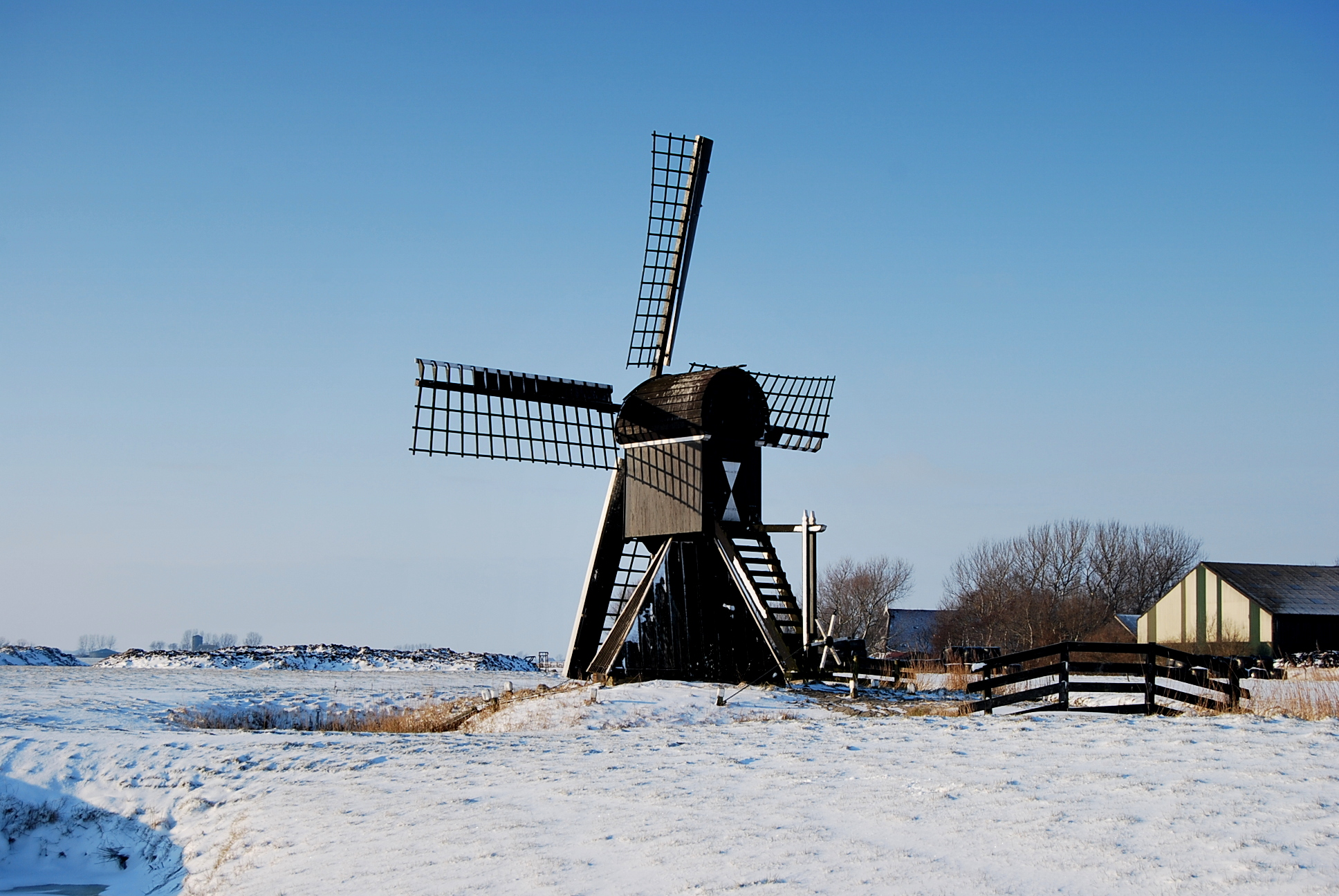
Wind mill Fatum
