= Piet Paulusma =

Dutch weather presenter (1956–2022)

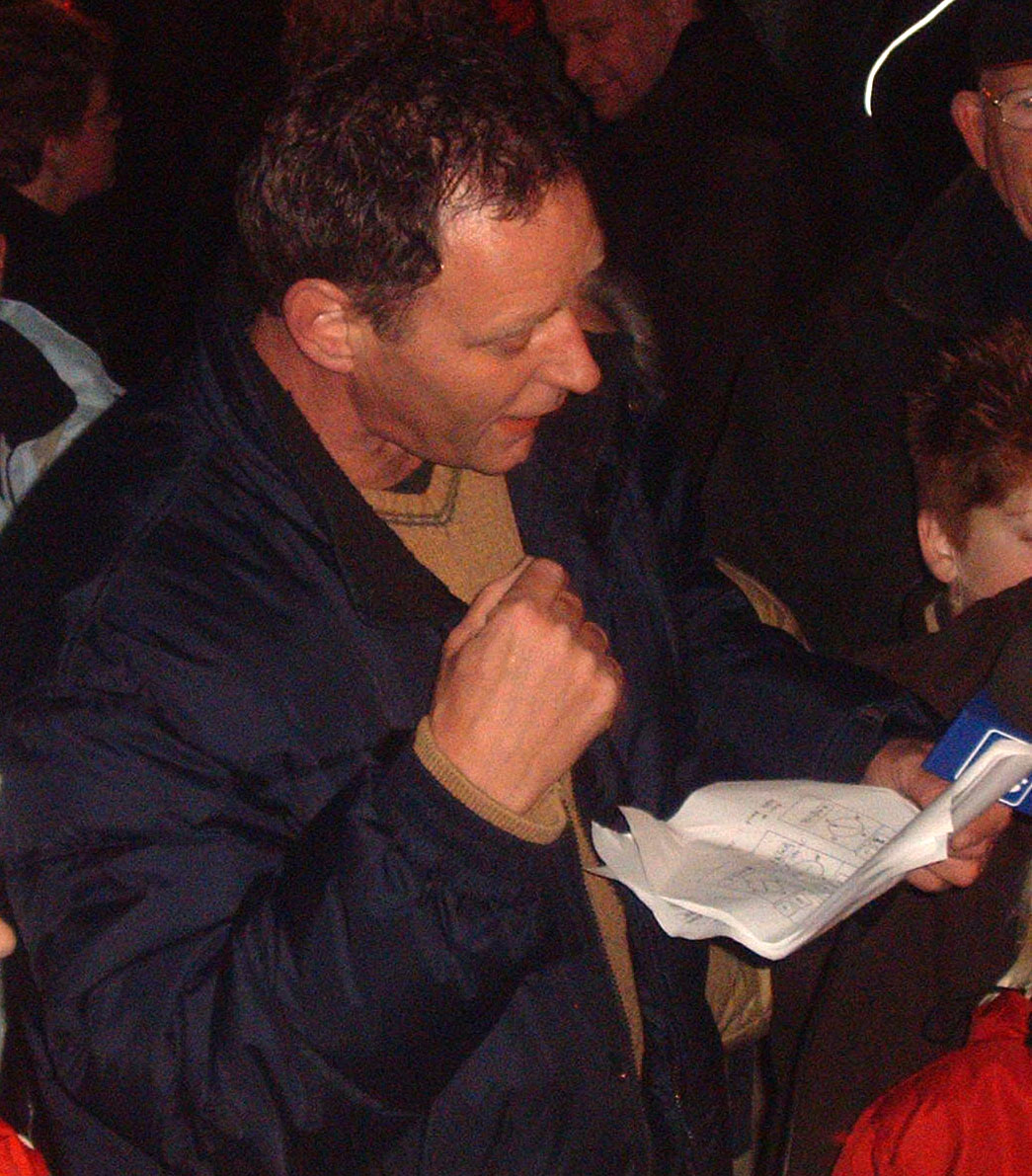
- Piet Paulusma in 2003
- Born: Pieter Paulusma; 15 December 1956; Tzum, Netherlands
- Died: 20 March 2022 (aged 65); Leeuwarden, Netherlands
- Occupation: weather presenter
- Employer(s): Omrop Fryslân (1985–1996); SBS6 (1996–2020); Omroep Max (2020–2022)
- Children: 4
- Honours: Knight in the Order of Orange-Nassau

Pieter "Piet"/"Pyt" Paulusma (15 December 1956 – 20 March 2022) was a Dutch weather presenter. He became known as the presenter of the weather forecast on television channel SBS6, titled Piets weerbericht (Piet's Weather Forecast), from 1997 to 2020. He also worked as a weather presenter for various other Dutch media organizations, including Omrop Fryslân and Omroep Max.

== Early life ==
Piet Paulusma was born on 15 December 1956 in Tzum. After completing secondary school Paulusma started working in the Calculation department at PTT Telecom, later known as KPN, at the age of 18. Over time, through taking training and internal courses, he worked his way up to billing manager. Outside of work hours, Paulusma took up meteorology as a hobby from the 1970s onwards. His first introduction to meteorology came from a Teleac course and from the studying of wearher phenomena. He later continued his education through self-study and with advice from his brother-in-law, who gave meteorology lectures.

== Weather broadcasting ==
Paulusma made his first weather reports for the Franeker Courant. This was followed in 1985 by his radio debut as a weatherman at Omrop Fryslân, and appearances in other media, such as the Friesch Dagblad and RTV Noord. In 1988, he established his weather company "Piet Paulusma Meteo Service." In 1994, he appeared on television for the first time as a weather presenter for Omrop Fryslân.

In the winter of 1995 and 1996, Paulusma was asked by ice master Henk Kroes to report on the Elfstedentocht as a Frisian weatherman. Although the race ultimately did not take place that year, it did lead to an invitation from SBS6 to apply for a position as a permanent weatherman. Paulusma was hired by SBS6, quitting his job at KPN to work full-time as a weatherman. While Paulusma was still known as "a regional weatherman" in February 1996, from his arrival in September of that year at national broadcaster SBS6 he soon became known nation-wide. Under the title Piets weerbericht, daily weather forecasts were made from a different outdoor location in the Netherlands each episode. Paulusma broke through to the general public with the Elfstedentocht of 1997. In the years that followed, he would be named as "Weatherman of the Year" three times (including in 2006), a tulip was named after him, and in 2010 he got his own comic strip.

Initially, Piets weerbericht (Piet's Weather Forecast) was part of the SBS6 news and current affairs program Hart van Nederland. From 2003 onward, the weather report was spun off as a separate program. This program lasted about 4 minutes and was broadcast immediately after the late edition of Hart van Nederland. The early edition of Hart van Nederland concluded with a short weather report by Paulusma. Paulusma always ended each episode with the Frisian closing line oant moarn ('see you tomorrow'). Paulusma was known for his use of unique and varied outdoor filming locations; in a 2016 interview, Paulusma said that during the summer months he received 90 to 100 invitations a day to visit various events. The broadcasts were invariably well-watched, with 1.3 million people watched his weather report daily in 2006.

Although Paulusma was still one of the most popular figures on the channel at that time, drawing an estimated 500,000 to 800,000 viewers, Paulusma was fired from SBS6 in 2019. His contract was not renewed after 23 years, and his last weather report would appear on 30 December 2019. In January 2020, he joined the public broadcaster MAX, where he presented the weather in the television program Tijd voor MAX, and every workday on NPO Radio 5. Paulusma also presented the weather report on Noordzee FM.

== Other media appearances ==
In 2002, Paulusma had a supporting role in the Frisian-language film De Kameleon sjocht yn it waar by F.F.J. Bernlef, a student association for Frisian students. The film was a parody of the 2003 Dutch-language film De Schippers van de Kameleon, in which Paulusma also played a small supporting role. In 2007, he played a weatherman in the Kabouter Plop film Plop en de penguïn.

From 2007, Paulusma appeared for some time in a Kwik-Fit commercial promoting winter tires. In 2010, the clip was used in the American film adaptation of Das Experiment, titled The Experiment.

== Death ==
In 2018, Paulusma was urgently admitted to hospital for bowel surgery. Paulusma died on 20 March 2022, at the age of 65 in a hospital in Leeuwarden from the effects of cancer. Paulusma had been suffering from cancer for some time, but he had not publicly revealed his diagnosis. His last television appearance as a weatherman was on Thursday, 17 March 2022, followed a day later by his last weather report on the radio.

On 19 March 2023, a monument was unveiled on the Cauberg in Valkenburg, in memory of Paulusma.

== Personal life ==
Paulusma lived in Harlingen. He had four children.

== Awards ==
On January 21, 2022, Paulusma was appointed Knight in the Order of Orange-Nassau for his dedication to Friesland and numerous civic organizations, receiving the medal in the States Hall of the Provincial House in Leeuwarden from the King's Commissioner for Friesland, Arno Brok, and mayor of Harlingen Ina Sjerps. The ribbon was pinned on Paulusma by his twin brother.
