= Teetlum, Tzum =

Windmill in Tzum, Netherlands

Teetlum or Duivenhok
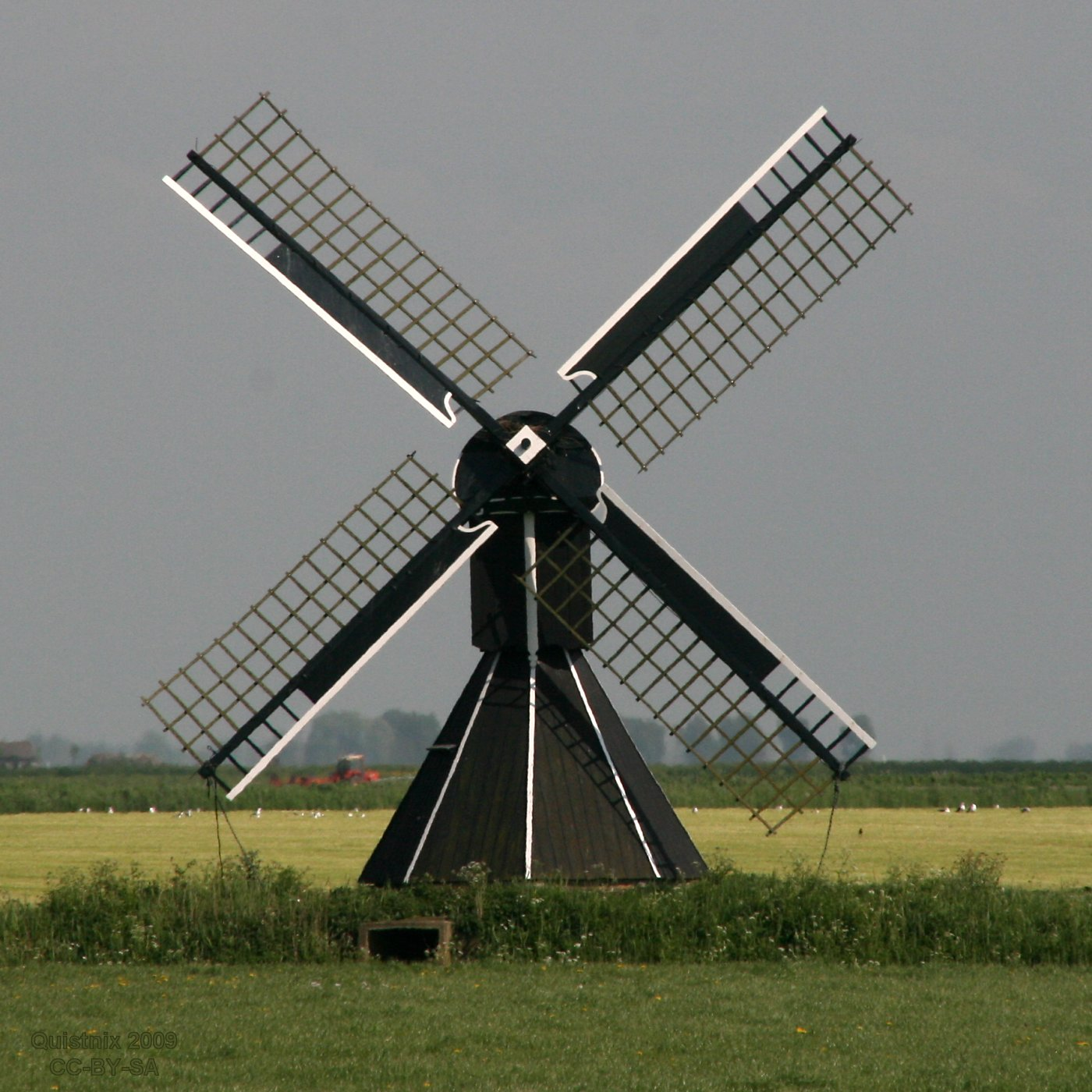
- Spinnenkop Teetlum in 2009
- Interactive map of Teetlum or Duivenhok

Origin
- Mill name: Teetlum or Duivenhok
- Mill location: Tzum
- Coordinates: 53°8′55″N 5°35′29″E
- Operator: Gemeente Franekeradeel
- Year built: ca 1800

Information
- Purpose: Drainage mill
- Type: Hollow post
- Roundhouse storeys: Single storey roundhouse
- No. of sails: Four sails
- Type of sails: Common sails
- Windshaft: Wood
- Winding: Tailpole and winch
- Type of pump: Archimedes' screw

Teetlum, (West Frisian: Teatlum) after a nearby terp, also known as Duivenhok 'dove coat' named after the polder it drained, is a drainage mill near the village of Tzum, Friesland, Netherlands. It is a hollow post windmill of the type called spinnenkop by the Dutch. The mill is listed as a Rijksmonument, number 15877 and can be used to drain the adjacent polder.

== History ==
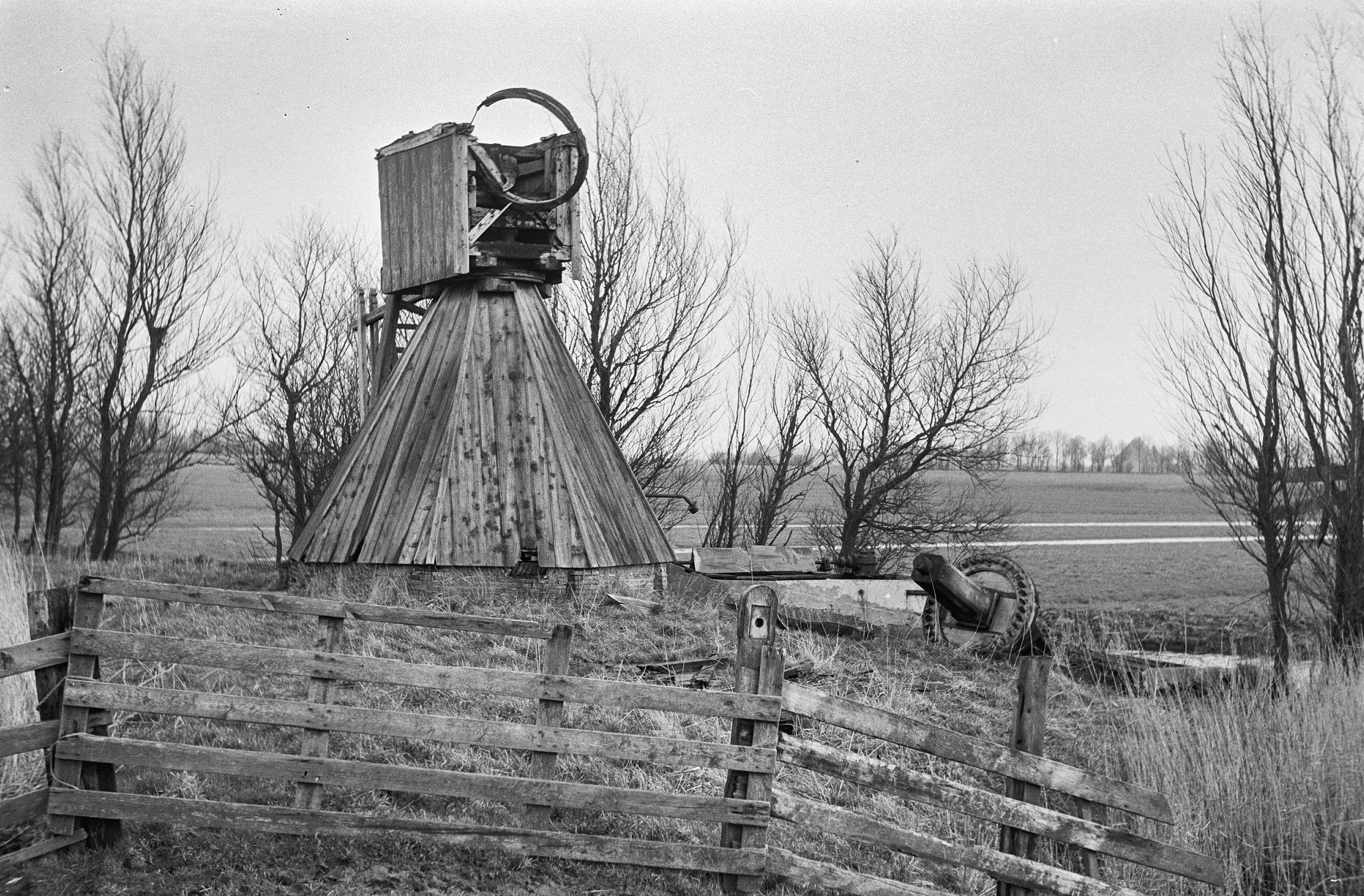
Duivenhok in 1974 showing the stormdamage

The mill was built around 1800 for draining the private polder Kramershoek, also known as Duivenhok. A merger of several polders around Tzum that was proposed in 1910 which would have left the mill without function and threatened its survival, however the plans were called off in 1924. Around 1960 the gearing was changed so the Archimedes' screw could be powered by a tractor. The windmill then fell into disrepair and was heavily damaged by a storm in April 1973 when the windshaft and sails were thrown to the ground. The head was repaired in 1975 and new stocks fitted in 1986, but the drainage function was not restored until later. In 2010 a stock broke. The stocks were again renewed in 2012, together with the wooden windshaft.

== Description ==
Teetlum is what the Dutch describe as a "spinnenkop" (English: spiderhead mill). It is a small hollow post mill winded by a winch. The four common sails have a span of 11.25 metres (36 ft 11 in) and are carried on a wooden windshaft. The brake wheel on the windshaft drives the wallower at the top of the upright shaft in the body (called head on a spinnenkop), which passed through the main post into the substructure. At the bottom of the upright shaft is the crown wheel which drives the wooden Archimedes' screw. The body (called head on a spinnenkop) and octagonal substructure are weatherboarded.

== Public access ==
The mill is not open to the public.
