= St. John's Church, Tzum =

St. John's Church
- Dutch: Johanneskerk West Frisian: Jehannestsjerke
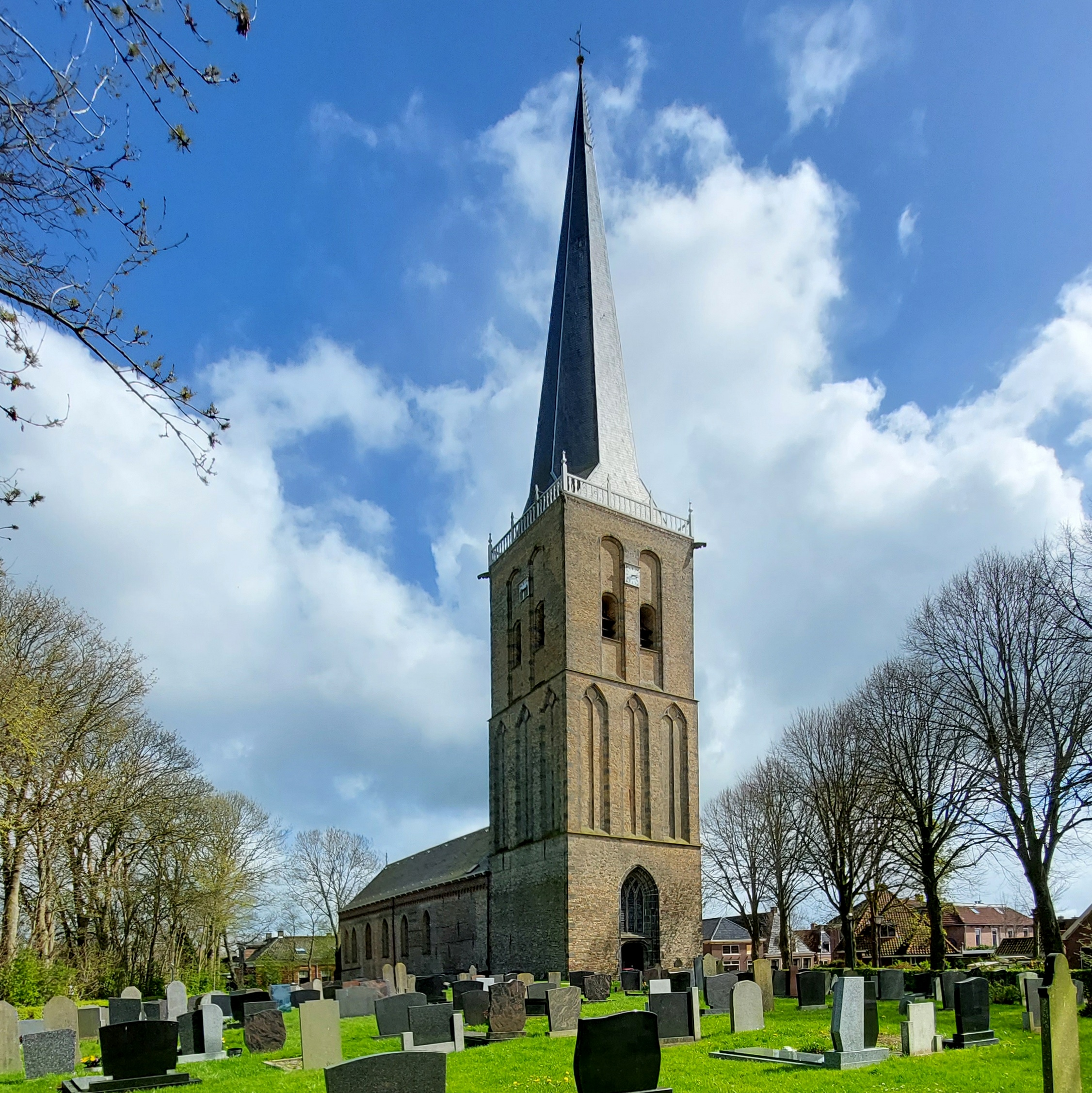
- St. John's Church
- St. John's Church
- 53°9′32″N 5°33′48″E
- Location: Franekerweg 47, Tzum, Friesland
- Country: Netherlands
- Denomination: Protestant Church in the Netherlands
- Website: www.pkntzum.nl

History
- Dedication: John the Baptist

Architecture
- Functional status: Active
- Heritage designation: Rijksmonument (nr. 15869)
- Designated: 1971
- Architect: Cornelis Claesz. (tower)
- Style: Romanesque (nave) Gothic (choir, tower)
- Years built: 12th century (nave) 14th century (choir) 1548–1549 (tower)

Specifications
- Height: 72 metres (236 ft)

The St. John's Church (Dutch: Johanneskerk, West Frisian: Jehannestsjerke) is a Protestant church in the Dutch village of Tzum, Friesland. Noteworthy is its 71 metres high church tower. A congregation of the Protestant Church in the Netherlands (PKN) gathers in the church.

== Description ==
The church, originally dedicated to John the Baptist, has a single-aisled Romanesque nave from the 12th century, of which the north facade is partly made of tuff stone, and a five-sided closed Gothic choir from the 14th century. Extensive restorations were carried out on both the interior and exterior from 1881–1882. The church was furthermore restored from 1960 to 1964 and 2000 to 2003. The church has been a rijksmonument since 1971.

=== Tower ===
The tower was built under the direction of Cornelis Claesz from 1548 to 1549, according to the foundation stone. The height of the tower is 72 metres, making it the second highest church tower in Friesland after the St. Boniface tower in Leeuwarden. The shaft of three sections measures 31 metres and the constricted spire 41 metres.

=== Bells ===
The bell tower contains three bells, of which one is from 1525 and was cast by Geert van Wou and Johannes Schonenborch. The two other bells are modern, originating from a Roman Catholic church in Bussum.

=== Organ ===
The organ from 1761 by Gerard Stevens was converted in 1764 by Albertus Antonius Hinsz. The case was made by Johannes George Hempel. In 1984–1985 the organ was restored. The organ has 20 registers.

== Gallery ==
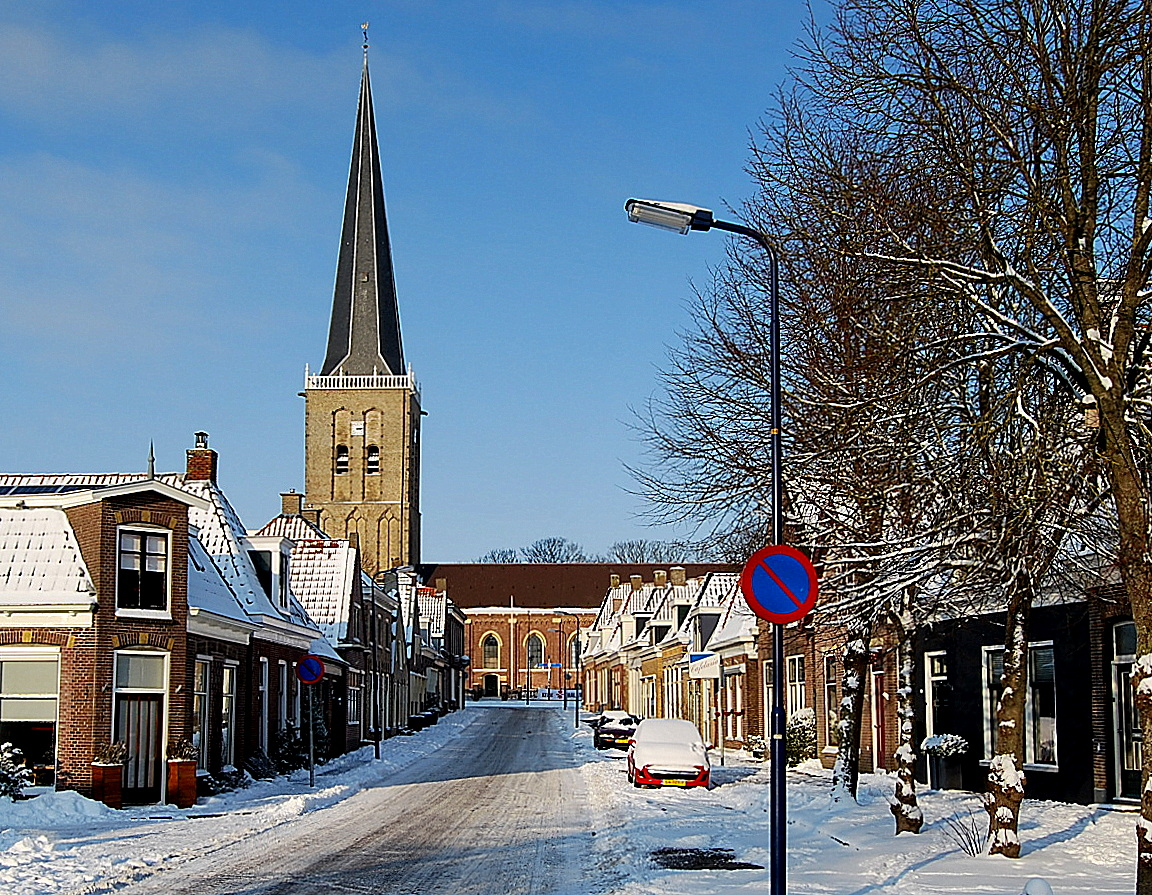
Church during the winter

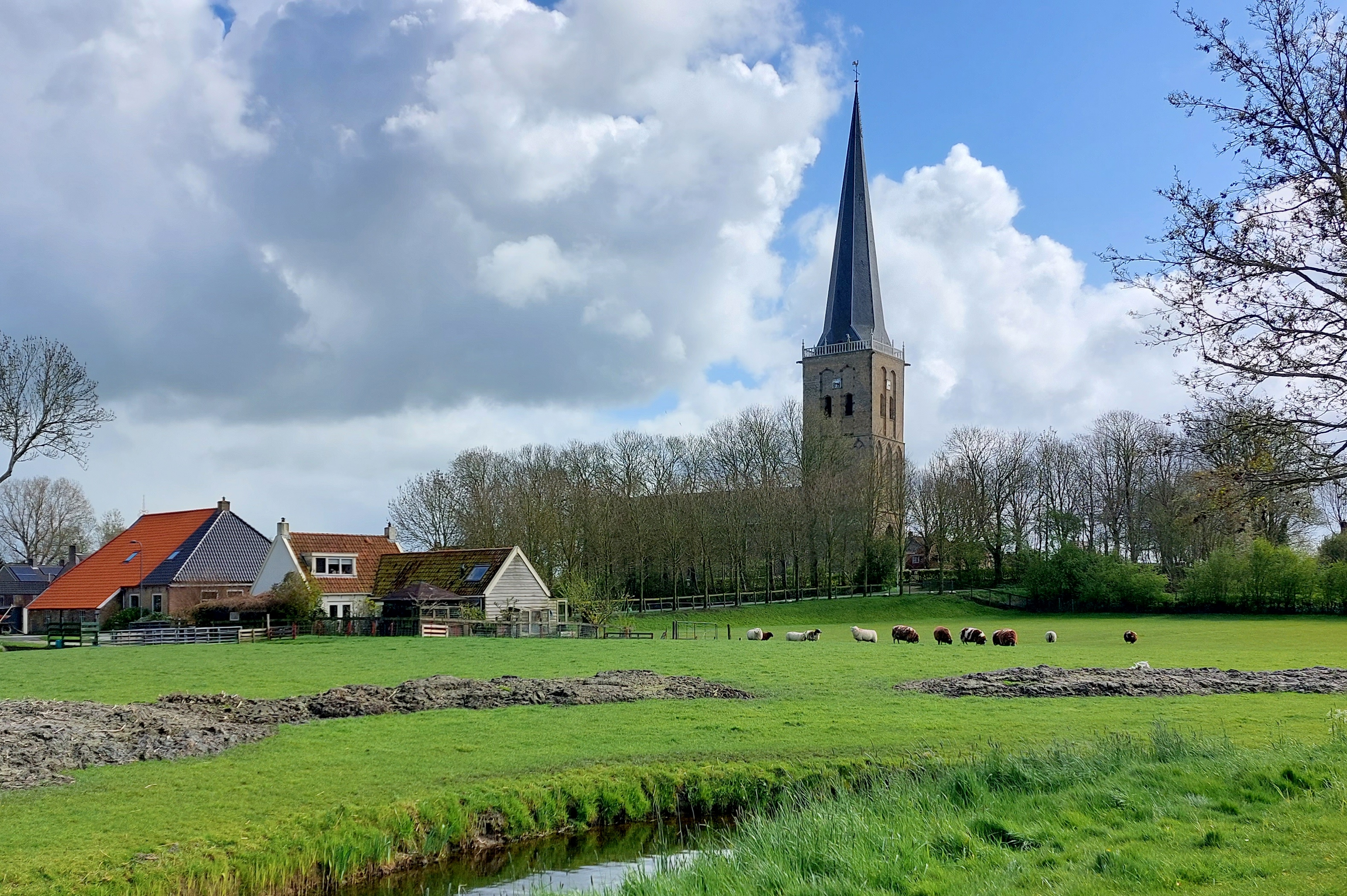
Church from afar

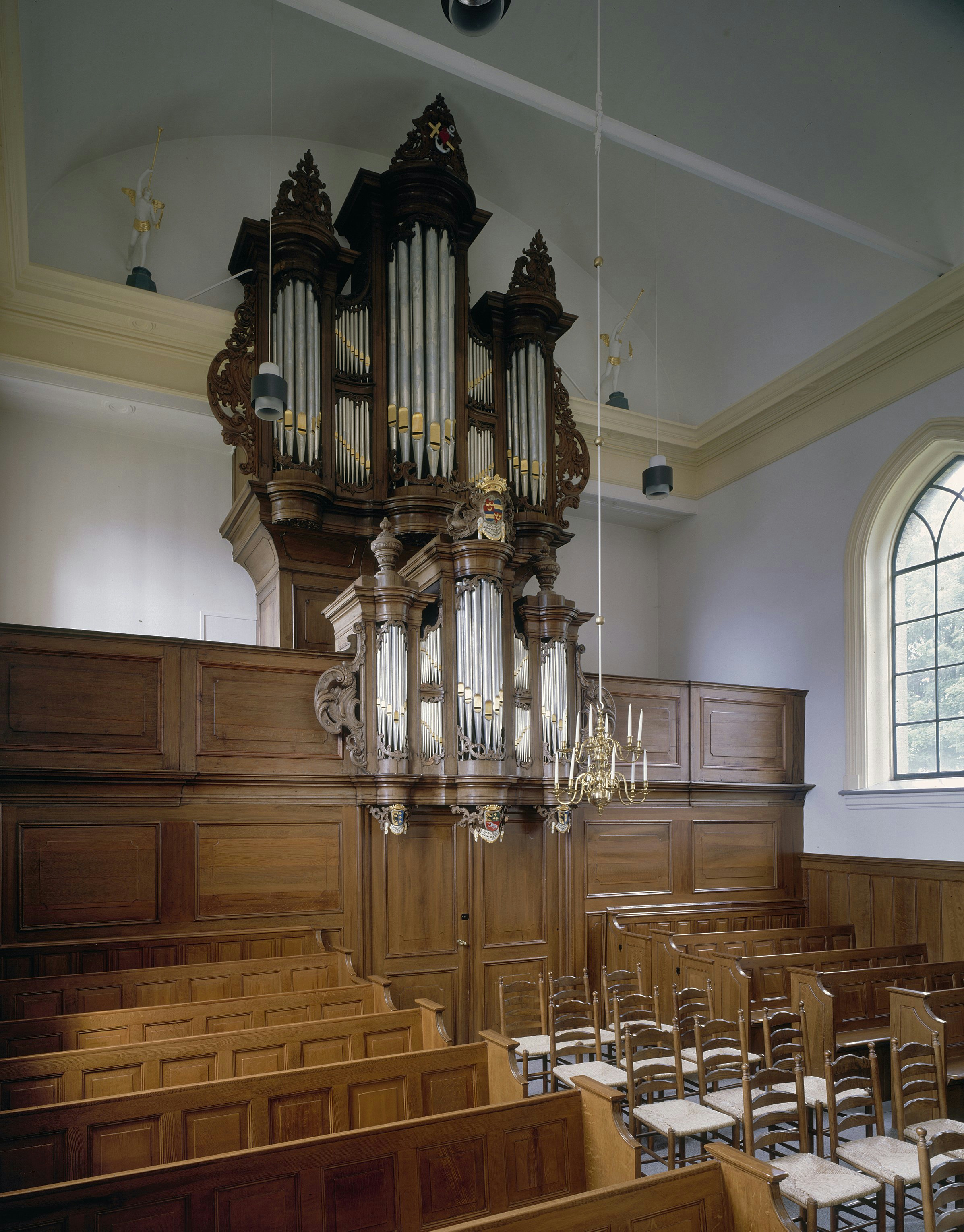
Organ

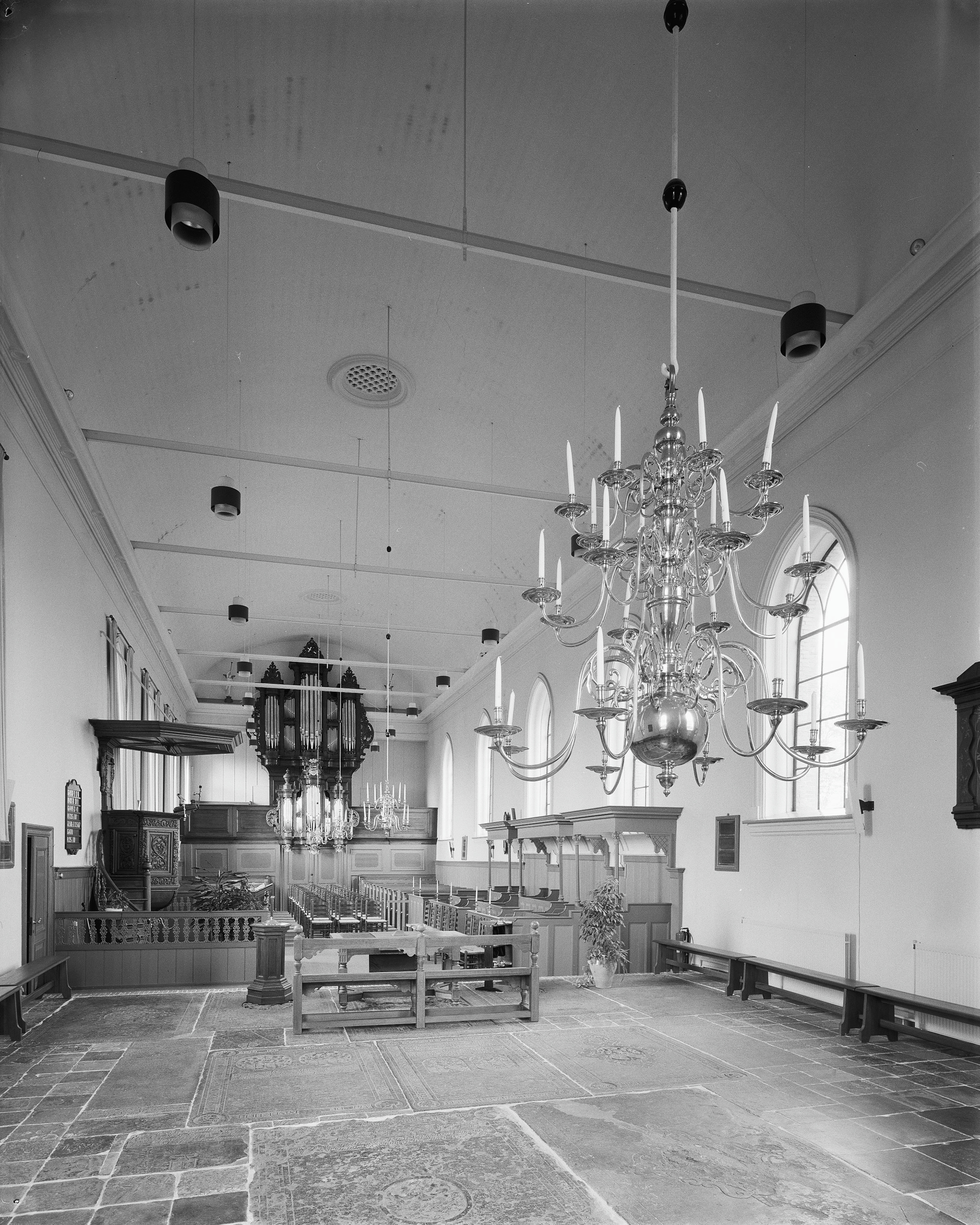
Interior
