= Johannes Belksma =

Dutch missionary

Johannes "Hans" Belksma (19 October 1884 in Tzum – 3 March 1942 in Tana Toraja) was a Dutch missionary. He was sent by Gereformeerde Zendingsbond, a missionary agency in Utrecht, Netherlands, to work in the Dutch East Indies.

Belksma arrived in Tana Toraja, South Sulawesi, Dutch East Indies in May 1916. There he was suggested by Gereformeerde Zendingsbond to build Kweekschool. Belksma established Normaalcursus in Tana Toraja.
