= Barrum =

- Hamlet
- Location in the province of Friesland in the Netherlands Barrum (Netherlands)
- Coordinates: 53.15010°N 5.56094°E
- Country: Netherlands
- Province: Friesland
- Municipality: Waadhoeke
- Village: Tzum
- Elevation: 0.5 m (1.6 ft)
- Time zone: UTC+1 (CET)
  - Summer (DST): UTC+2 (CEST)
- Postcode: 8804
- Area code: 0517

Barrum is a hamlet in the Dutch municipality of Waadhoeke in the province of Friesland. It is located south of Tzum, of which it is a part administratively. It lies directly to the north of the hamlet of Koum. It currently consists of two farms on a side road of a road called the Slotwei.

== History ==
Barrum was originally an inhabited terp. The deepest farm would be on part of the mound. The mound was probably excavated around 1925.

The hamlet was first attested as Beerma buren in 1406. In 1427 the hamlet and terp itself was referred to as Berrum. There was a stins on the mound that was referred to as Berma stins in 1433. On a map by Schotanus from 1664 it was mentioned as Barzum, yet this could be a confusion with another hamlet, located a little more south, Barsum. In 1850 the place was referred to as Barrum, and it is estimated that around that time, 14 people were living in the two farms of the hamlet. The place name could possibly indicate a place of residence (-um) in a muddy land, from the Old Frisian word ber for mud. It could either mean the residence of a person named Bera.
