= Holprijp =

Holprijp Holpryp (West Frisian)
- Hamlet
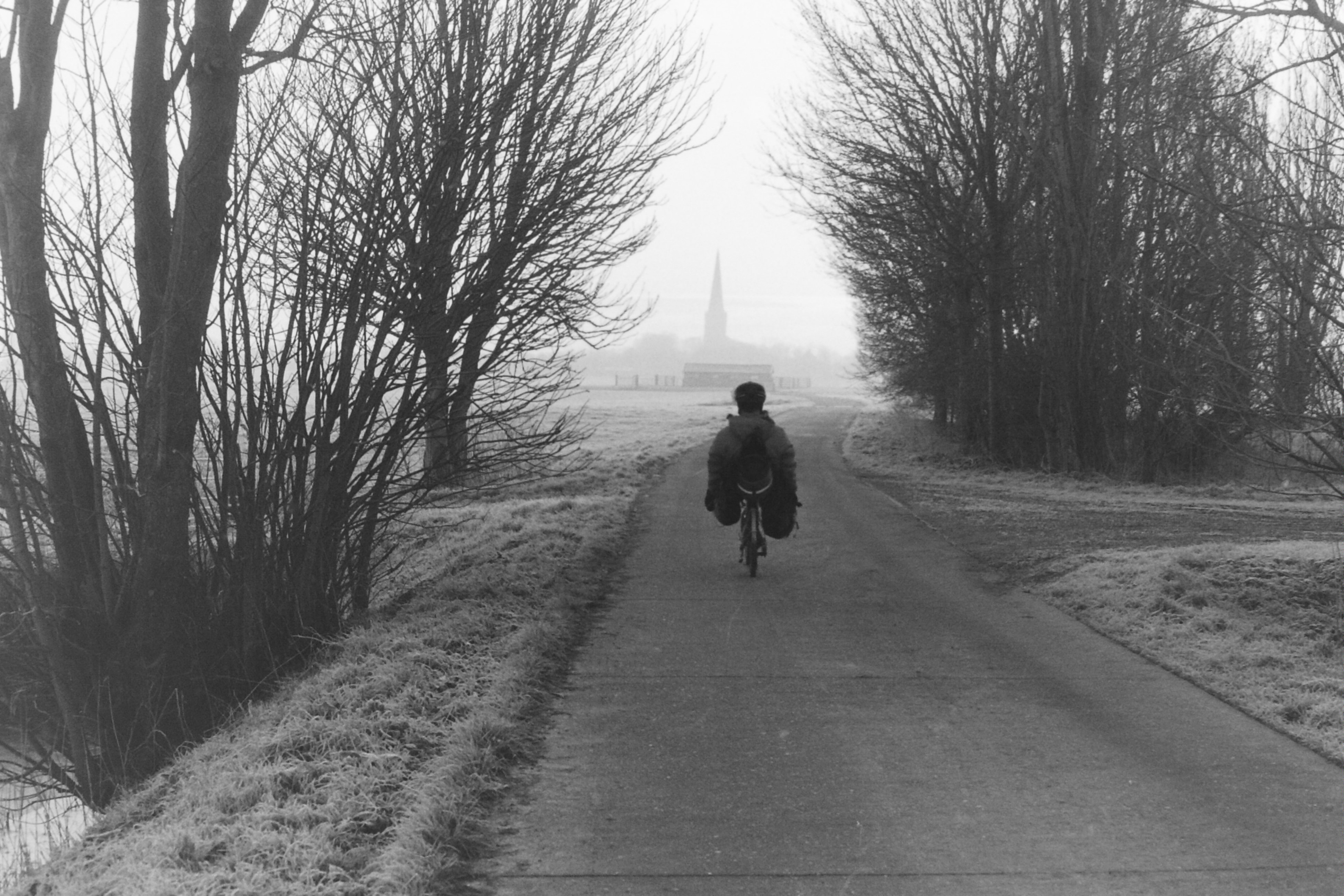

- Location in the province of Friesland in the Netherlands Holprijp (Netherlands)
- Coordinates: 53.16270°N 5.54521°E
- Country: Netherlands
- Province: Friesland
- Municipality: Waadhoeke
- Village: Tzum
- Elevation: 0.4 m (1.3 ft)
- Time zone: UTC+1 (CET)
  - Summer (DST): UTC+2 (CEST)
- Postcode: 8804
- Area code: 0517

Holprijp (Dutch: [ˈɦɔlprɛip]; West Frisian: Holpryp) is a hamlet in the Dutch municipality of Waadhoeke in the province of Friesland. It is located south of Franeker and northwest of Tzum, of which it is a part administratively. The settlement of the hamlet is located on the country road of the same name that runs from the Lollumerweg to Tzum. At Tzum it connects to the hamlet of Laakwerd.

== History ==
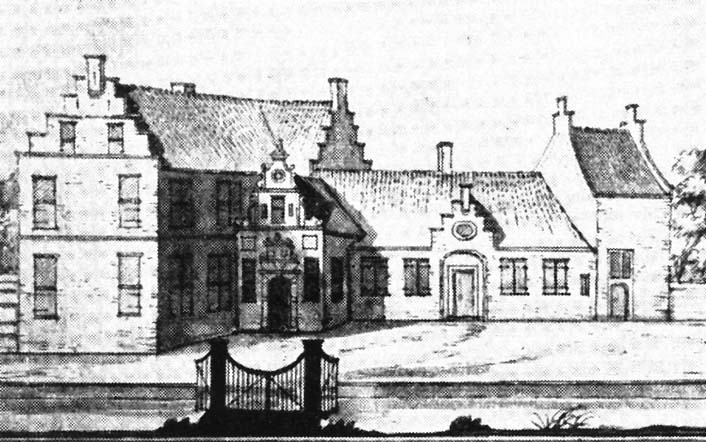
Hottinga State, drawn in 1723

The name Holprijp first appeared on a map in 1433. In 1414 the medieval jurisdiction was still referred to as Ripera fiarndel or Rijperda fiarndel. The hamlet has grown and shrunk over the centuries.

This hamlet used to be home to a significant stins, the Hottinga State, which is also clearly depicted on a map from 1664. Another stins, the Sybranda State, also used to be located in the hamlet, belonging to the same broad family. Hottinga State has been demolished and only the farm remains. The so-called huiseiland ('home island') is still very much visible by a moat and planted trees.
