= Saint Boniface church, Leeuwarden =

Neogothic church in Leeuwarden, Netherlands

Saint Boniface
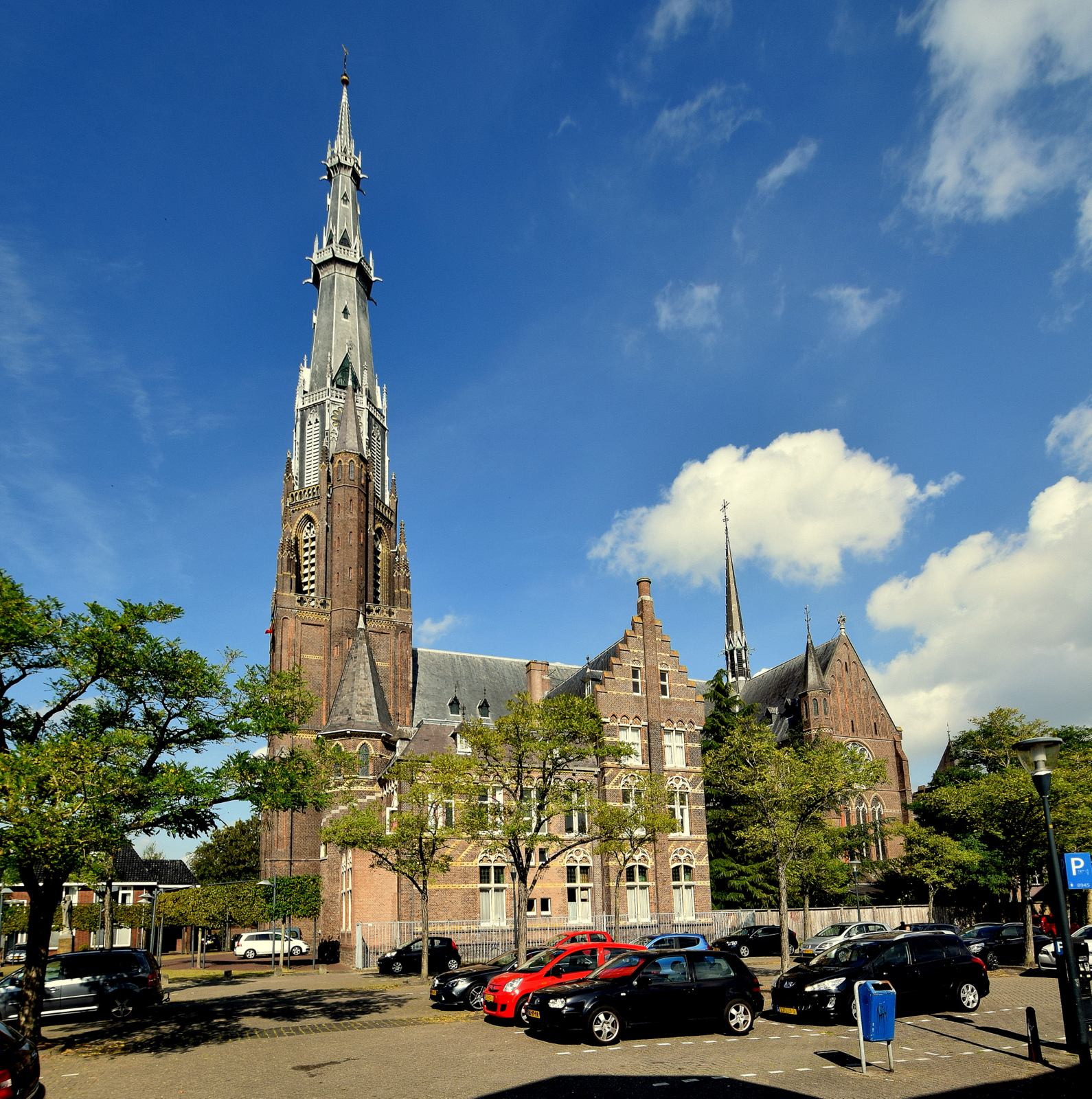

Religion
- Affiliation: Catholic

Location
- Location: Leeuwarden, Netherlands
- Interactive map of Saint Boniface
- Coordinates: 53.1215°N 05.4809°E

Architecture
- Type: Church
- Style: Gothic revival
- Groundbreaking: 1882

The Saint Boniface church (West Frisian: Sint-Bonifatiustsjerke, Dutch: Sint-Bonifatiuskerk) is a church in Leeuwarden, the Netherlands.

== History ==
The Gothic revival church was designed by Pierre Cuypers and built between 1882 and 1884. In the Church dedicated to Saint Boniface is a pipe organ built by the French organ builder Aristide Cavaillé-Coll. The organ was originally built for the Saint Willibrord College in Katwijk

The church is part of the Roman Catholic Diocese of Groningen-Leeuwarden
