= Wier, Netherlands =

Wier
- Village
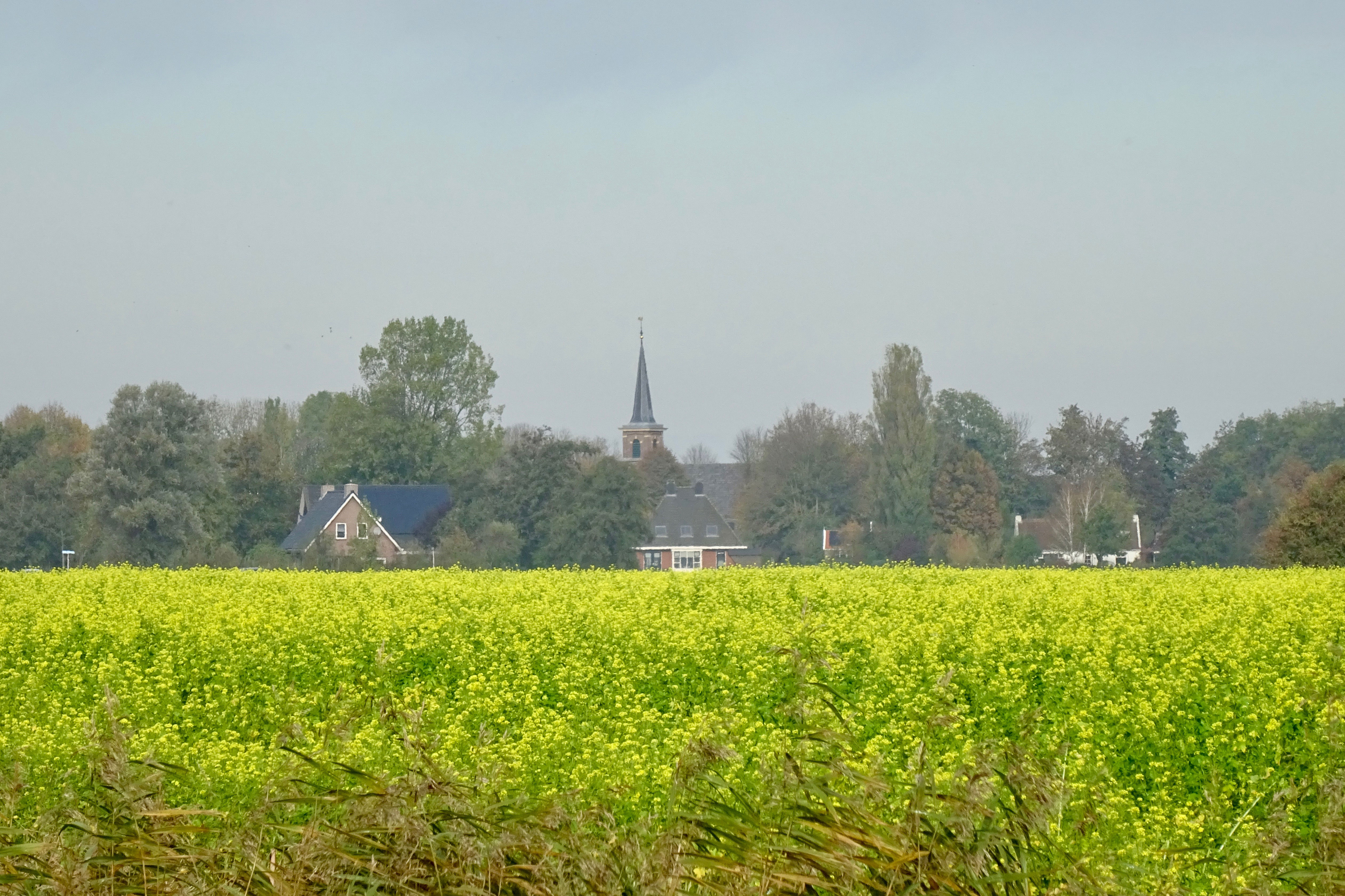
- View on Wier

- Coat of arms

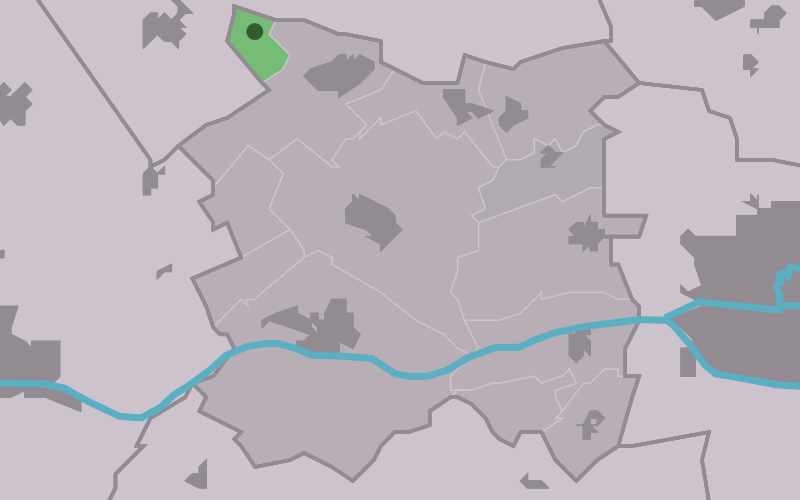
- Location in Menameradiel municipality

- Location in the Netherlands Wier (Netherlands)
- Country: Netherlands
- Province: Friesland
- Municipality: Waadhoeke

Area
  - Total: 1.77 km^{2} (0.68 sq mi)
- Elevation: 1.3 m (4.3 ft)

Population (2021)
  - Total: 190
  - Density: 110/km^{2} (280/sq mi)
- Time zone: UTC+1 (CET)
  - Summer (DST): UTC+2 (CEST)
- Postal code: 9043
- Dialing code: 0518

Wier is a village in Waadhoeke municipality in the province of Friesland, the Netherlands. It had a population of 210 in January 2017.

== History ==
The village was first mentioned in the 13th century as Werue, and means terp (artificial living hill). The terp probably dates from the beginning of our era and was located on the outskirts of the Middelzee. It was originally a fishing village, and was connected to Berlikum via a canal.

The Dutch Reformed church was built in the 12th century. The tower dates from 1881. The church was restored in 2012. The church contains a unique astrarium which was created by an onderduiker (person in hiding) during World War II and donated to the church in 1946.

The stins Lauta State was first mentioned in 1192. Around 1740, it was owned by Horatius Hiddema van Knijff, the grietman (mayor/judge) of Menaldumadeel. The population considered the taxes in the grietenij too high, and van Knijff was accused of conspiring with the French. On the night of 1 to 2 June 1748, there was a revolt and the angry population burnt down the estate. Van Knijff managed to flee. Only the tower remained standing until c. 1900 when it was demolished.

When the Middelzee started to retreat, Wier turned into an agricultural community. Wier was home to 258 people in 1840. In 1981, a radar post was built in Wier as part of the NATO Integrated Air Defense System. In 2021, the installation was renewed, and the old tower was replaced. In 2024 a radome was placed on the radar to reduce noise pollution for the local residents.

Before 2018, the village was part of the Menameradiel municipality.

== Gallery ==
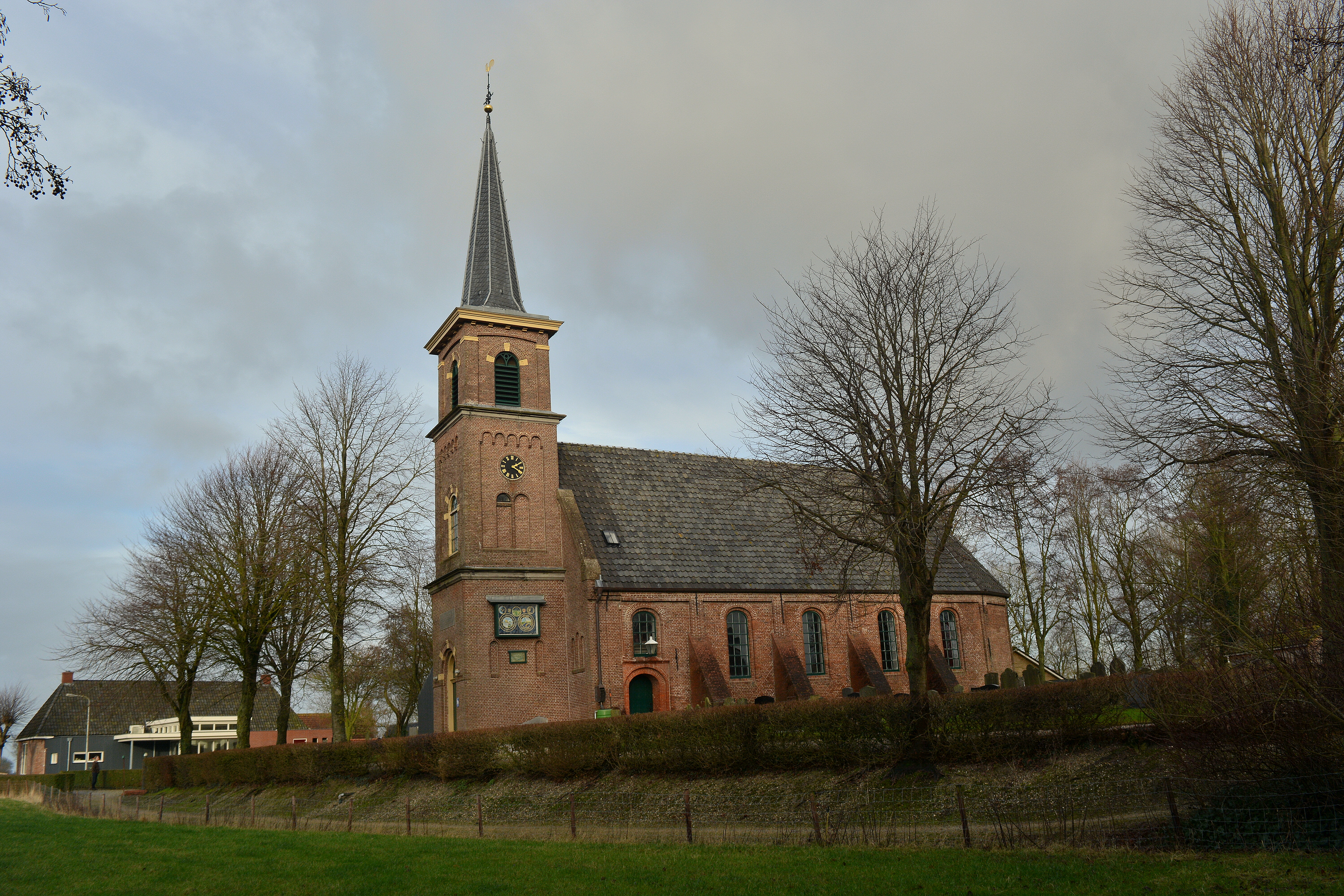
Protestant church

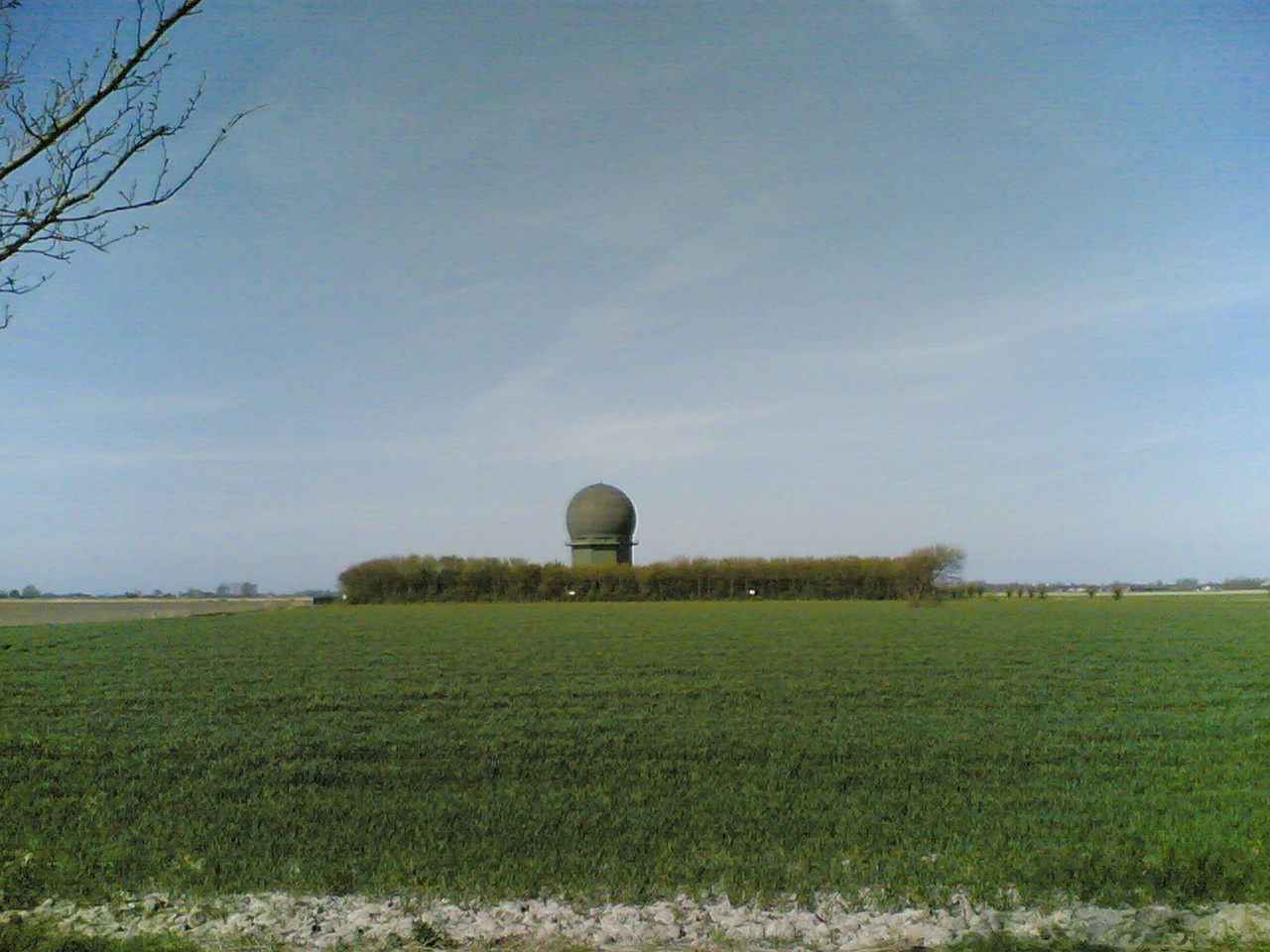
Radar installation (2008)

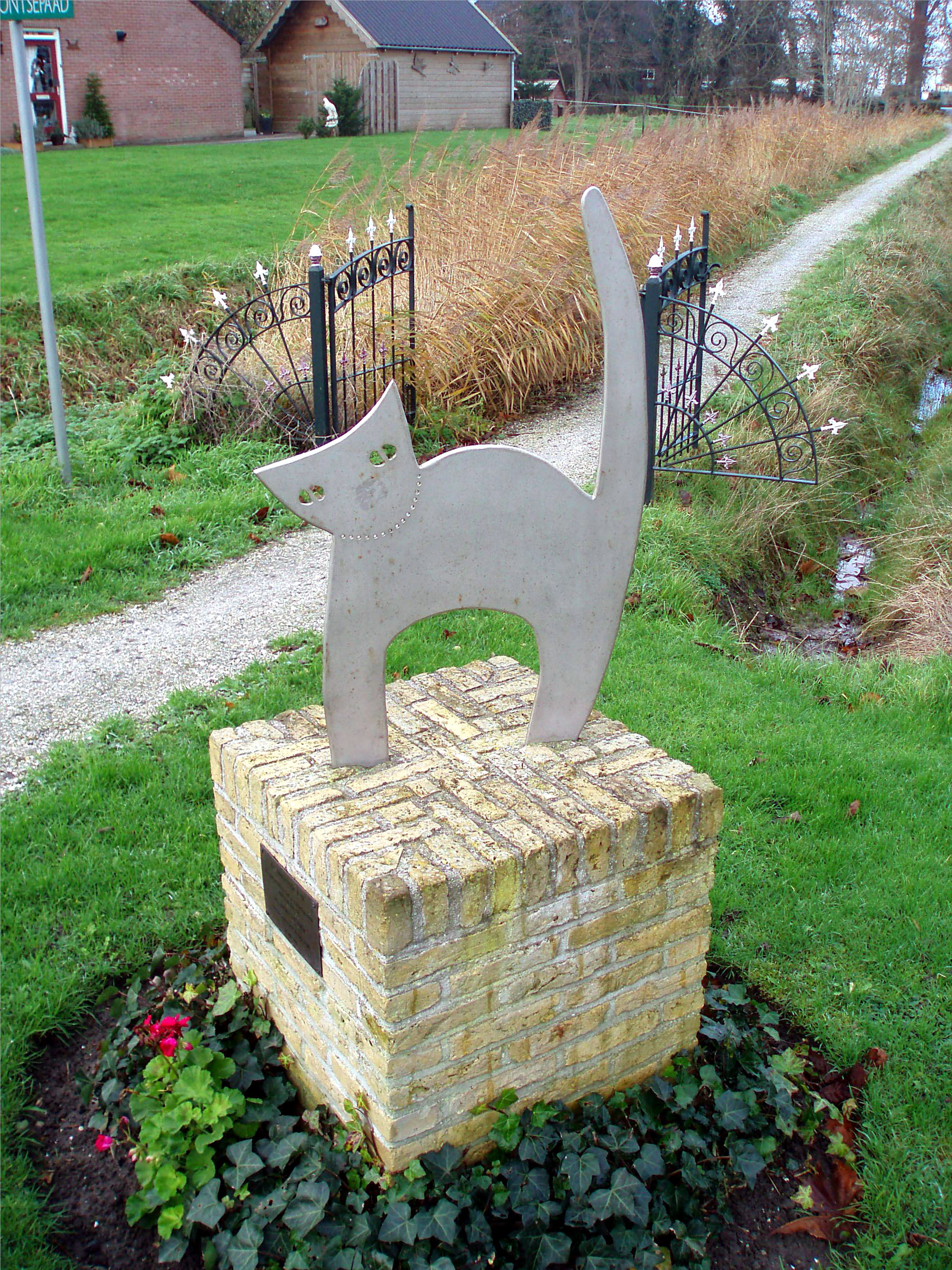
Cat statue
