= Blessum =

- Village
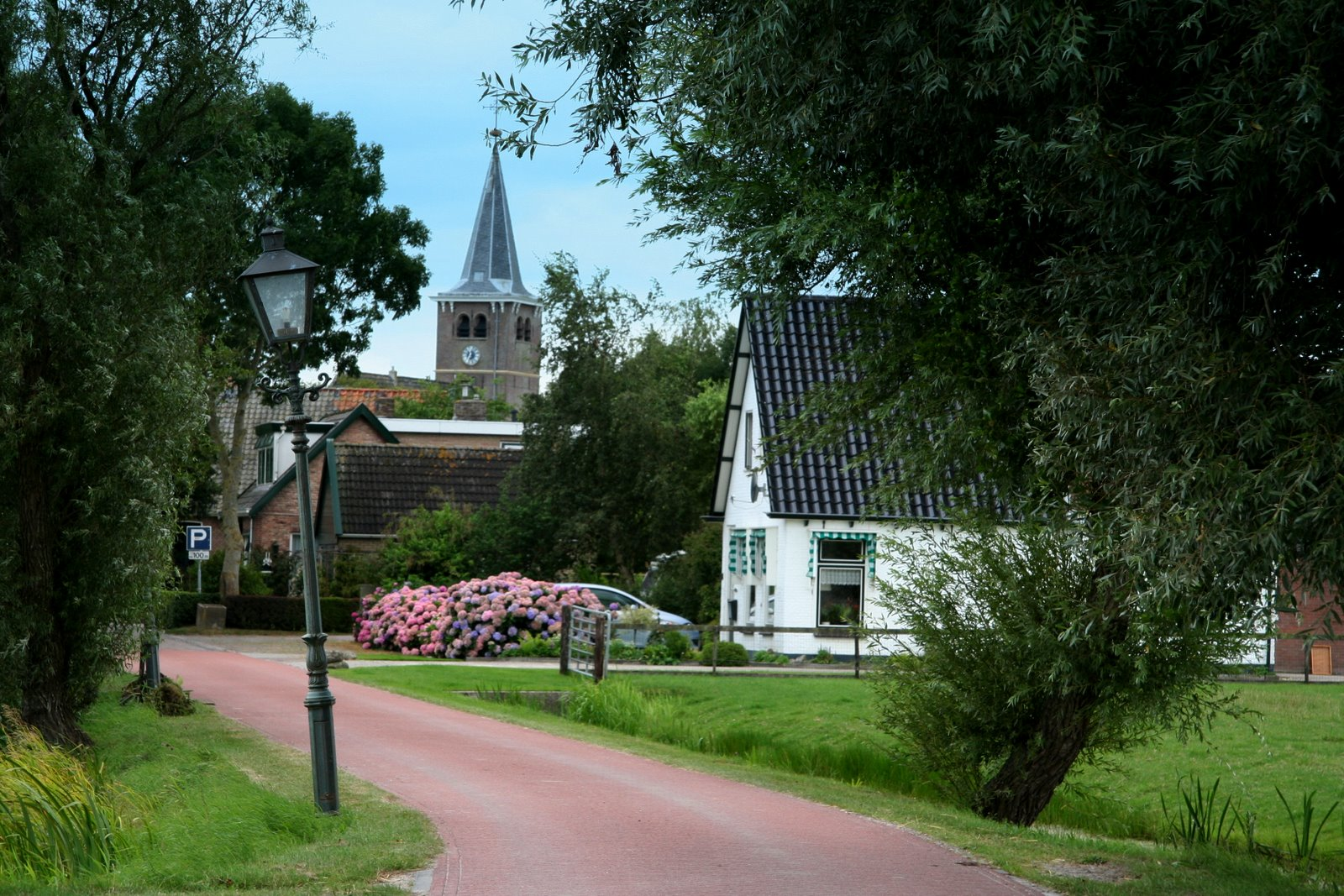
- Blessum

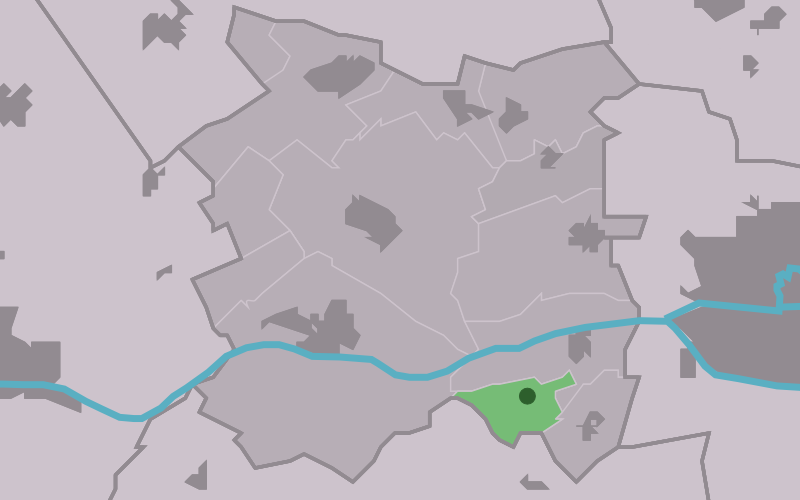
- Location in Menameradiel municipality

- Location in the Netherlands Blessum (Netherlands)
- Country: Netherlands
- Province: Friesland
- Municipality: Waadhoeke

Area
  - Total: 2.65 km^{2} (1.02 sq mi)
- Elevation: 0.7 m (2.3 ft)

Population (2021)
  - Total: 80
  - Density: 30/km^{2} (78/sq mi)
- Time zone: UTC+1 (CET)
  - Summer (DST): UTC+2 (CEST)
- Postal code: 9032
- Dialing code: 058

Blessum is a small village in Waadhoeke municipality in the province of Friesland, the Netherlands. It had a population of around 89 in January 2017. Before 2018, the village was part of the Menameradiel municipality.

== History ==
The village was first mentioned between 1250 and 1275 as Blesingum, and means "settlement of the people of Blesse (person)". Blessum is a terp (artificial living hill) village from the early Middle Ages, and was known to be inhabited in the 9th century. It was located along the former Middelzee, and had a little harbour.

The Dutch Reformed church was built by monks around 1250, and was modified in the 15th century. The tower is from the 13th or 14th century and was restored in 1879. Nowadays, it is only used 8 times a year as church, and its main purpose is village house and bed and breakfast. The Ringia State was built before 1469 by Doecke Rinia, the local judge. It was demolished in 1823 and replaced by a farm.

Blessum was home to 169 people in 1840. Ironically, Blessum has become more isolated due to the nearby construction of railway lines and motorways, because it is nowadays located at a dead-end road. During World War II, it was home to many onderduikers (people in hiding). There was a constant watch from the church tower and a silent alarm was given when people approached the village.

== Gallery ==
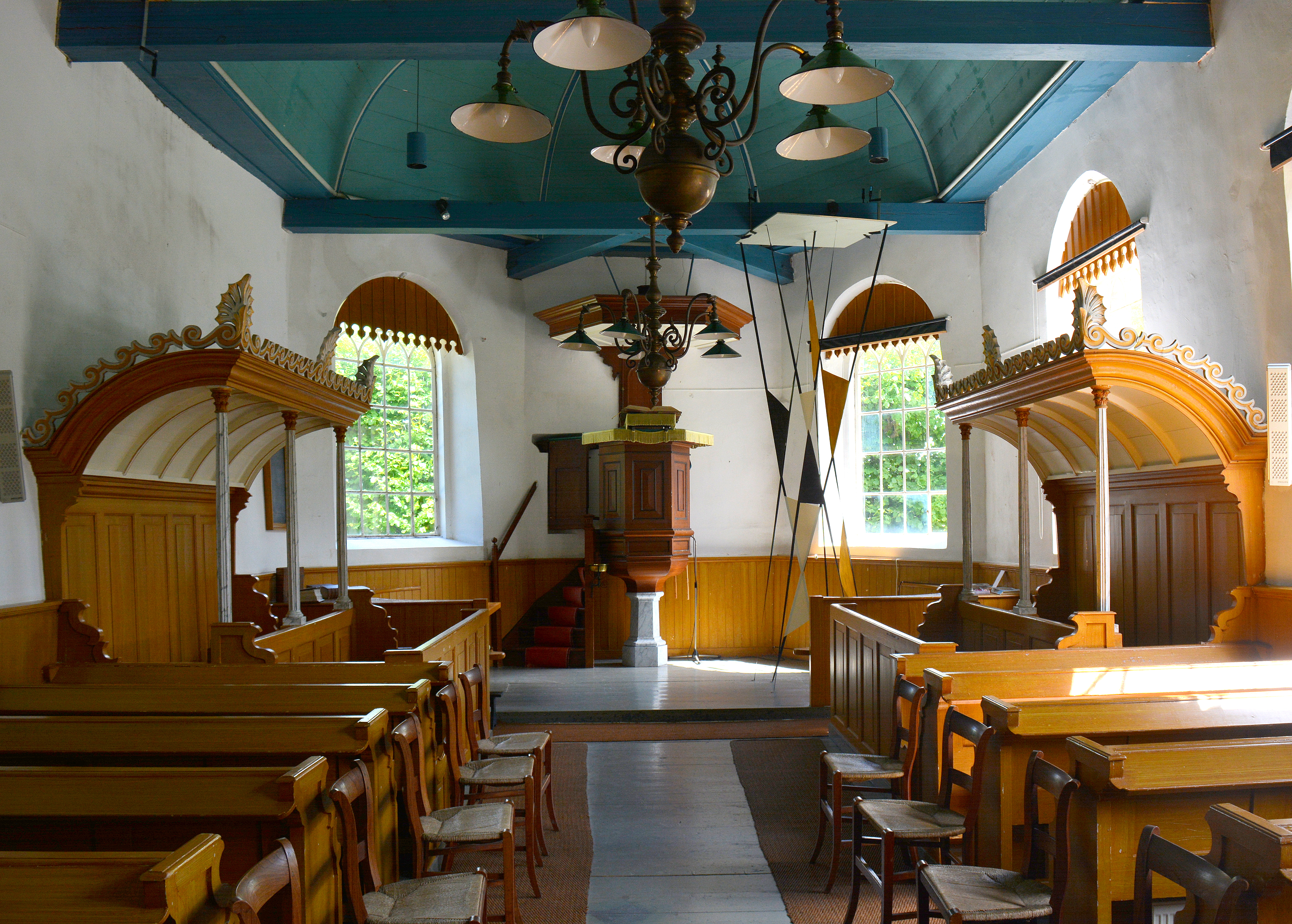
Interior of the church

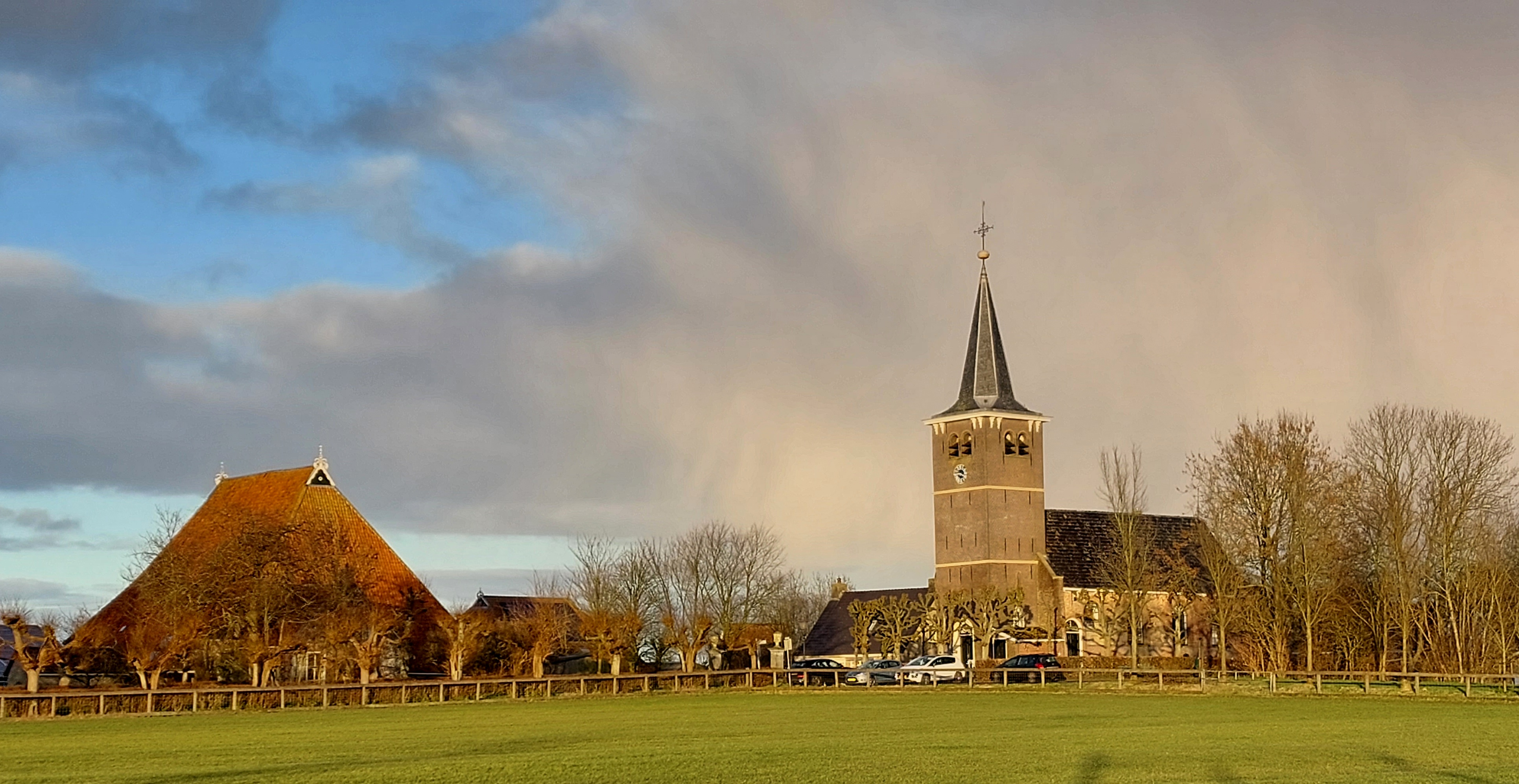
View on Blessum

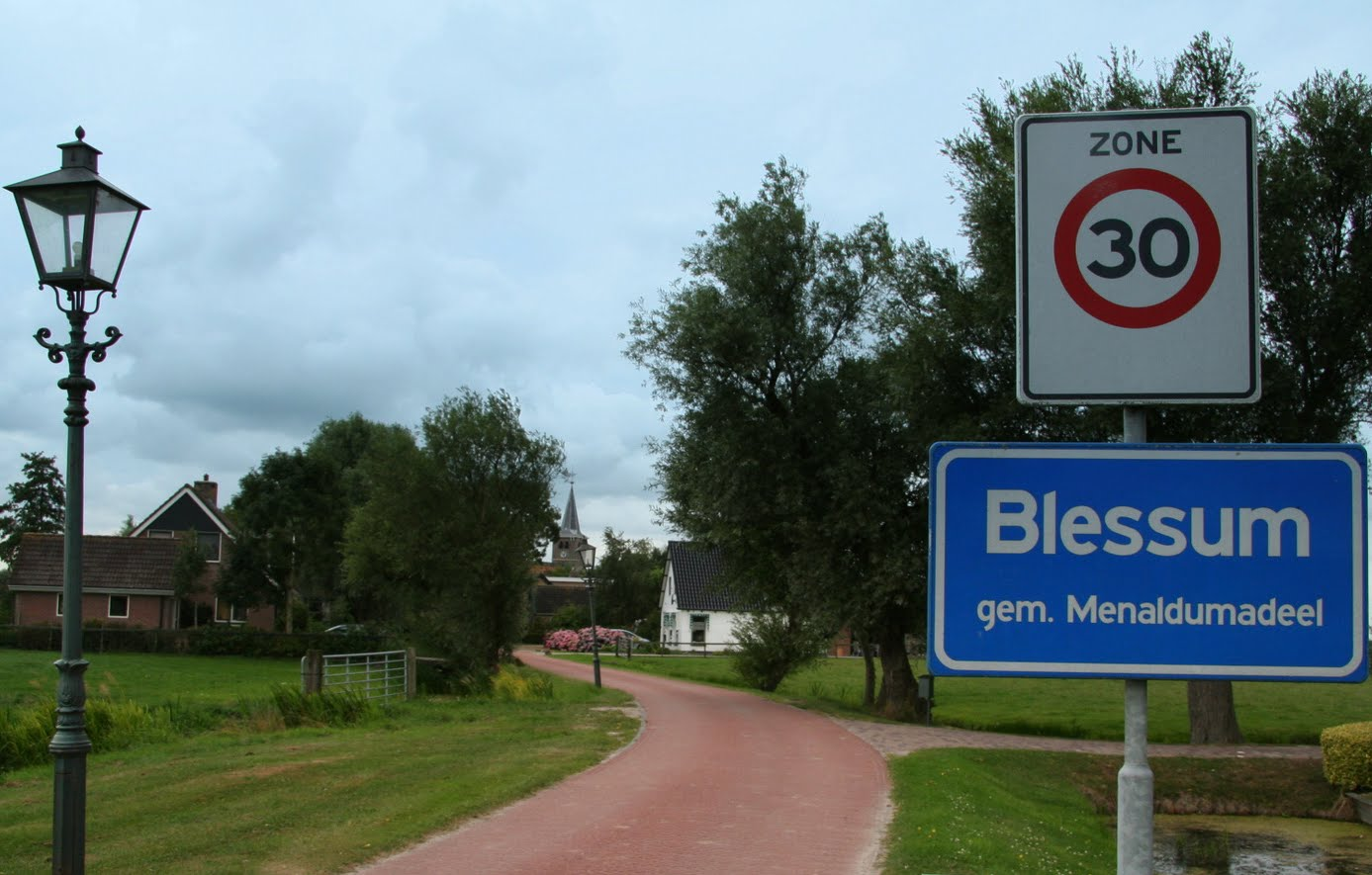
Welcome to Blessum

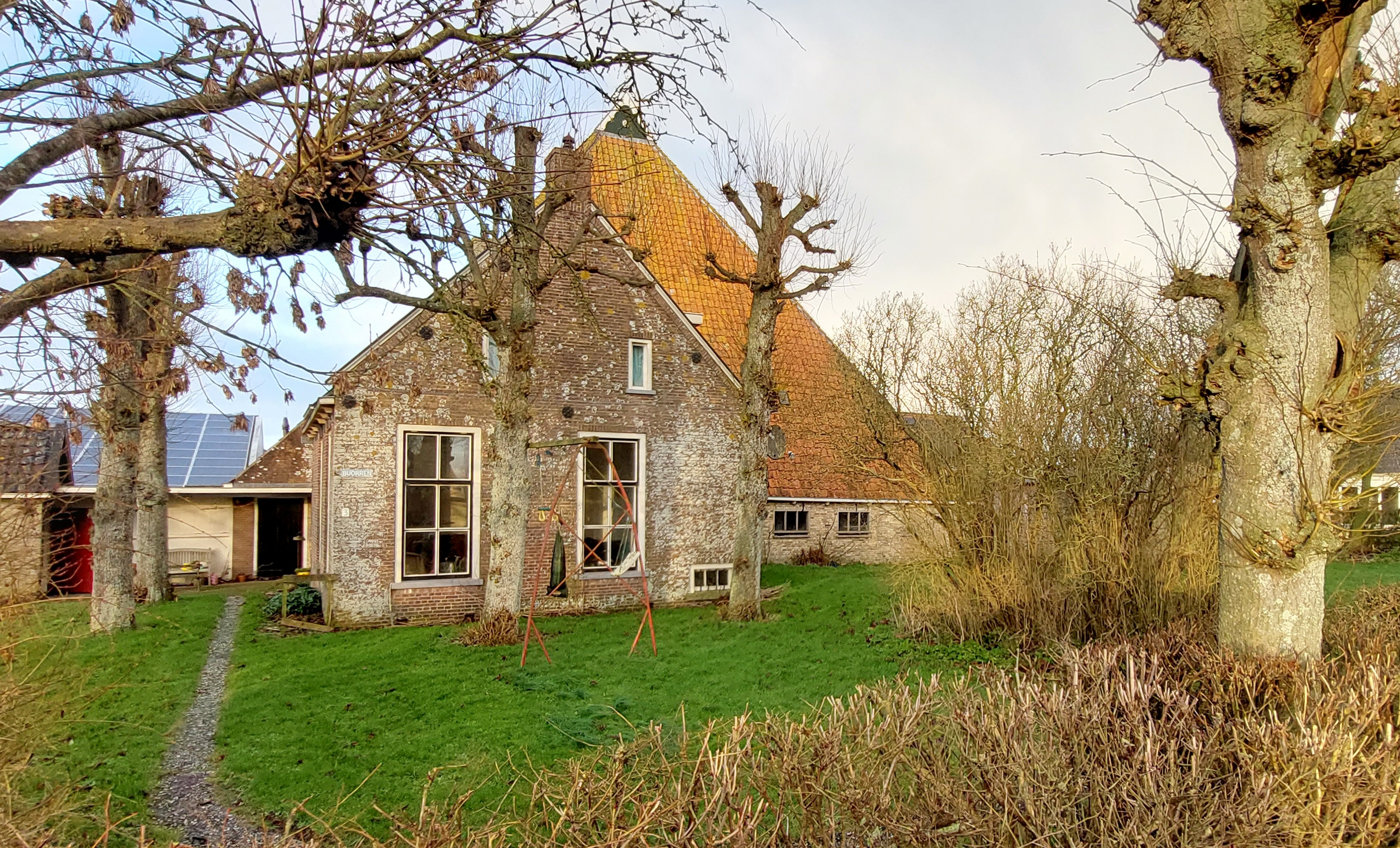
Farm in Blessum
