= Boksum =

- Village
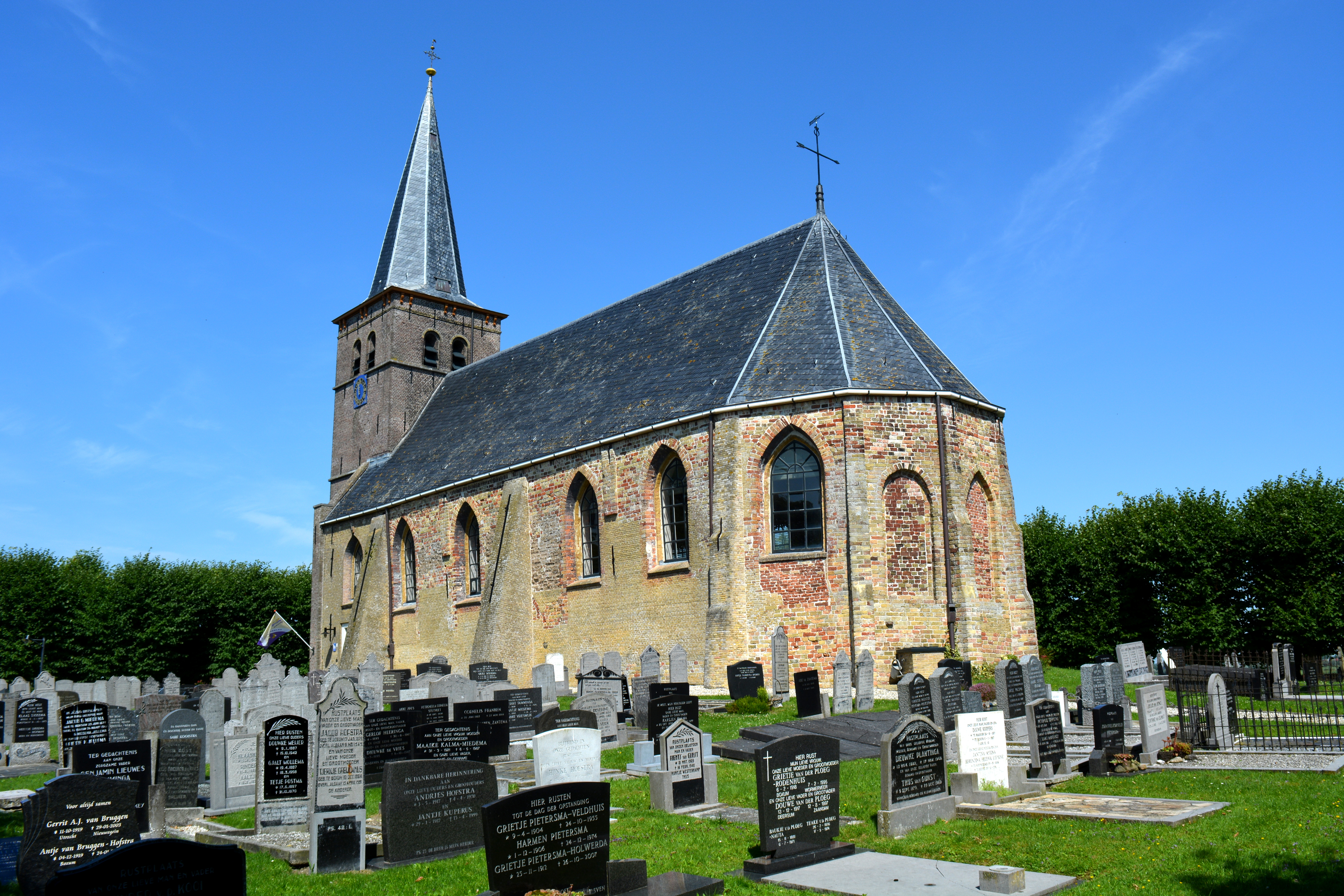
- St Margaret's church

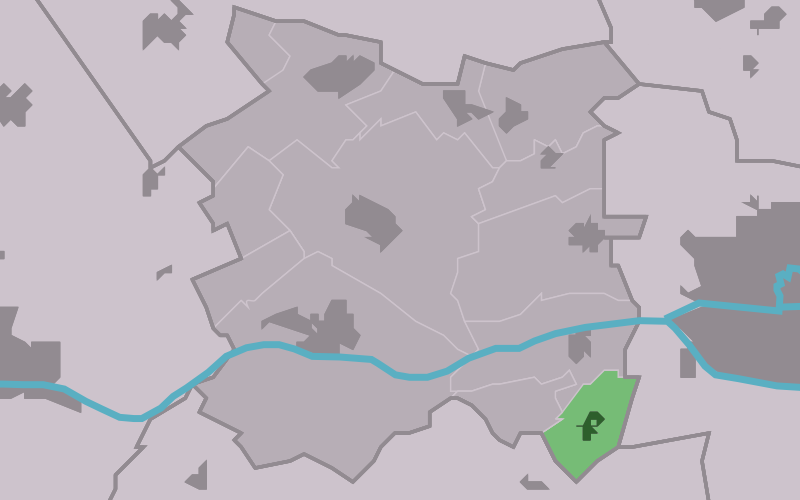
- Location in Menameradiel municipality

- Location in the Netherlands Boksum (Netherlands)
- Country: Netherlands
- Province: Friesland
- Municipality: Waadhoeke

Area
  - Total: 2.71 km^{2} (1.05 sq mi)
- Elevation: 0.7 m (2.3 ft)

Population (2021)
  - Total: 420
  - Density: 150/km^{2} (400/sq mi)
- Time zone: UTC+1 (CET)
  - Summer (DST): UTC+2 (CEST)
- Postal code: 9031
- Dialing code: 058

Boksum (Dutch pronunciation: [ˈbɔksʏm]) is a village in Waadhoeke municipality in the province of Friesland, the Netherlands. It had a population of around 400 people in 2020 Before 2018, the village was part of the Menameradiel municipality.

== Overview ==
The village was first mentioned in the 13th century as Boxum, meaning "settlement of Bokke or Bokse". Boksum was a terp (artificial living hill) village with a radial structure which dates from before Christ. It was built close to the Middelzee. The Dutch Reformed church has elements from the 12th century, and has been enlarged several times. The tower collapsed in 1842 and was rebuilt in 1843 using the stones of the previous tower.

On 17 January 1586, the last battle of the Dutch Revolt in Friesland was fought near Boksum. The Spanish won the battle, and an estimated 1,000 Dutch soldiers died; however, the ice had started to melt and an easy passage to the capital Leeuwarden over the ice was no longer an option.

Boksum was home to 237 people in 1840. The terp was partially excavated in 1869.

Modern Boksum has a bakery, a community center and two churches. The oldest of the two churches is still used as a church belonging to the Dutch Reformed Church. The elementary school was used to teach three languages: Dutch, West Frisian and English, but closed in 2019 due a lack of students. The remainder of the school was incorporated into the elementary school in Deinum, an adjacent village.

== Gallery ==
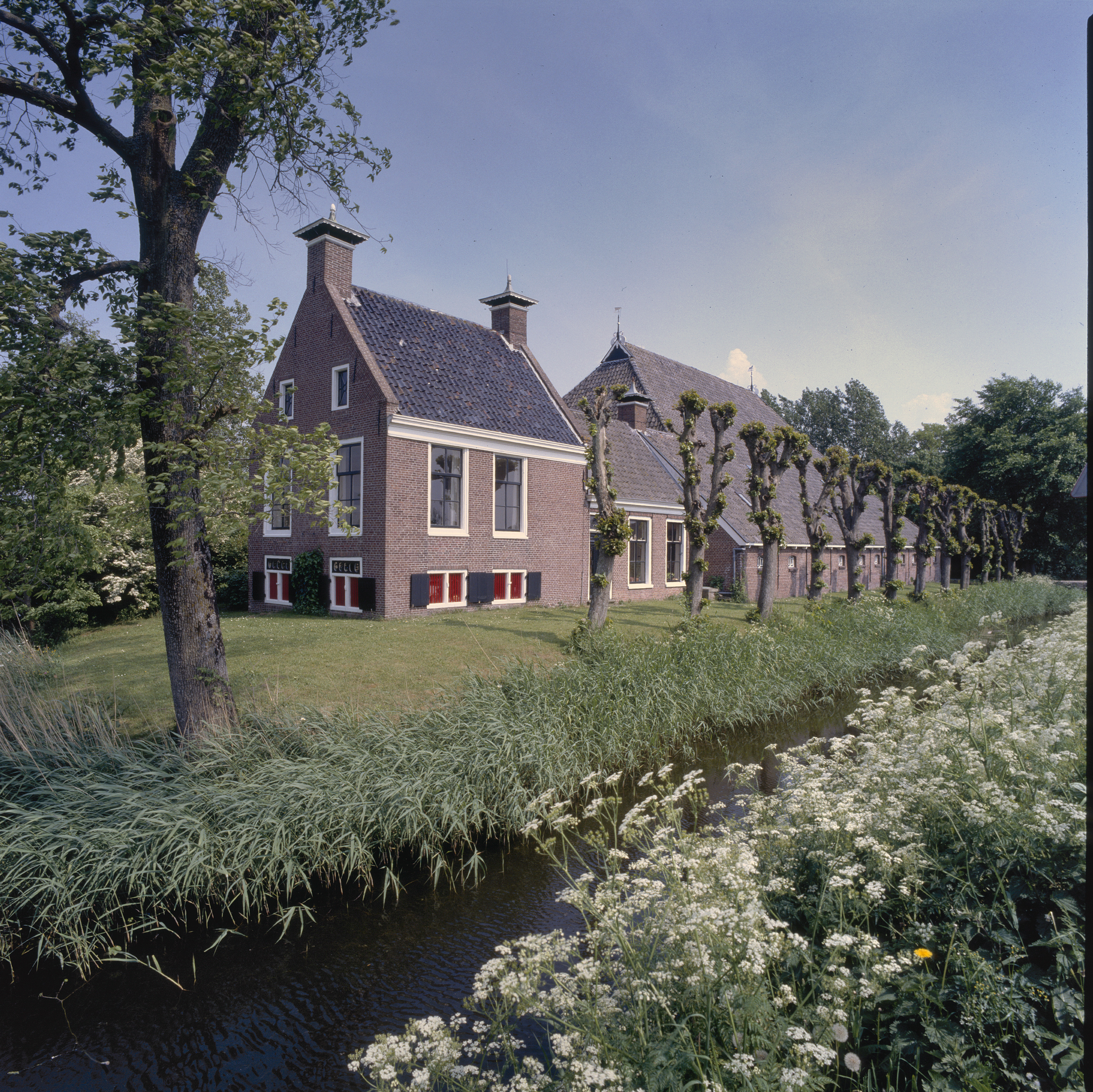
Farm in Boksum

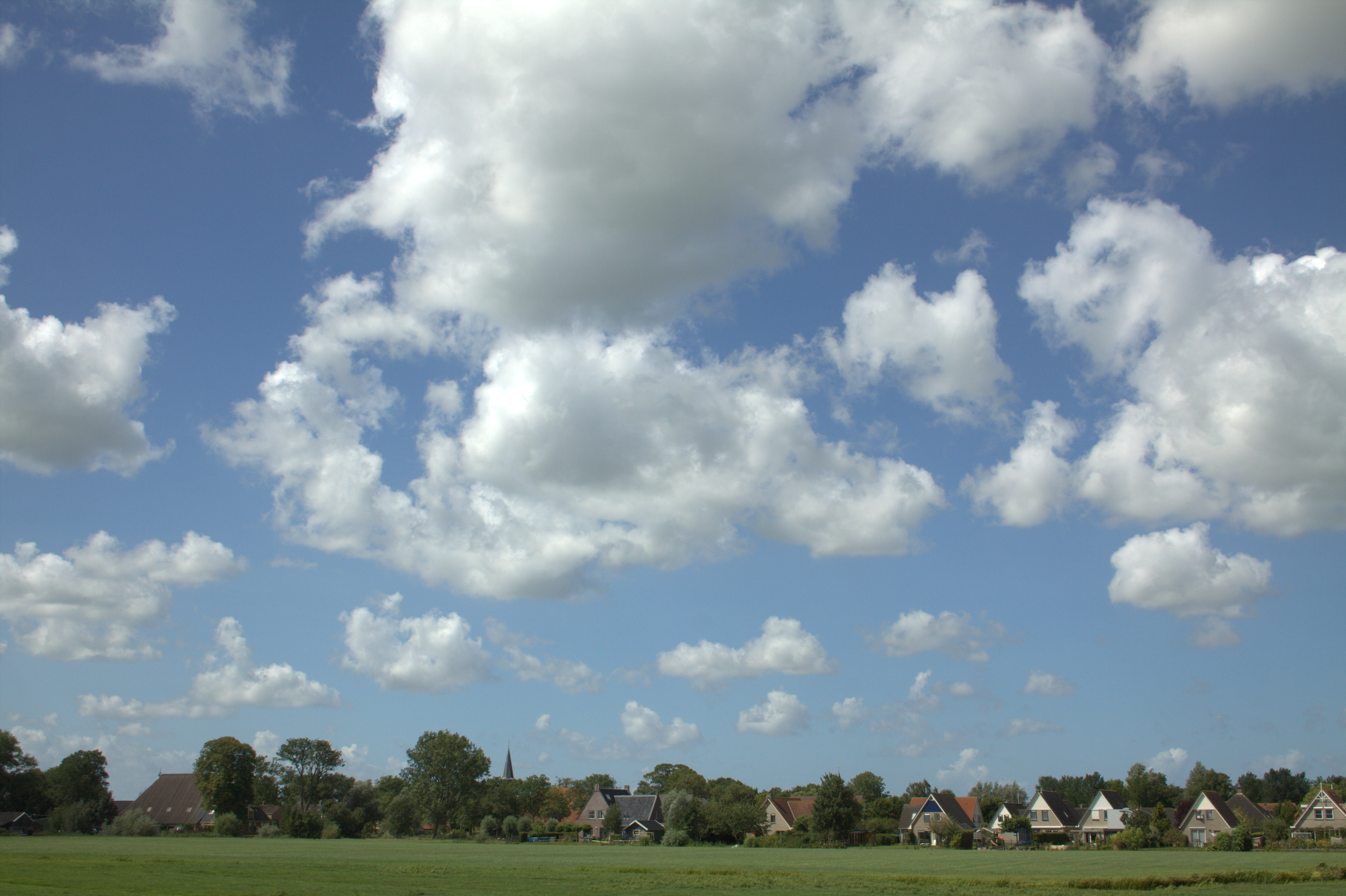
View of Boksum
