= Skingen =

Schingen Skingen
- Village
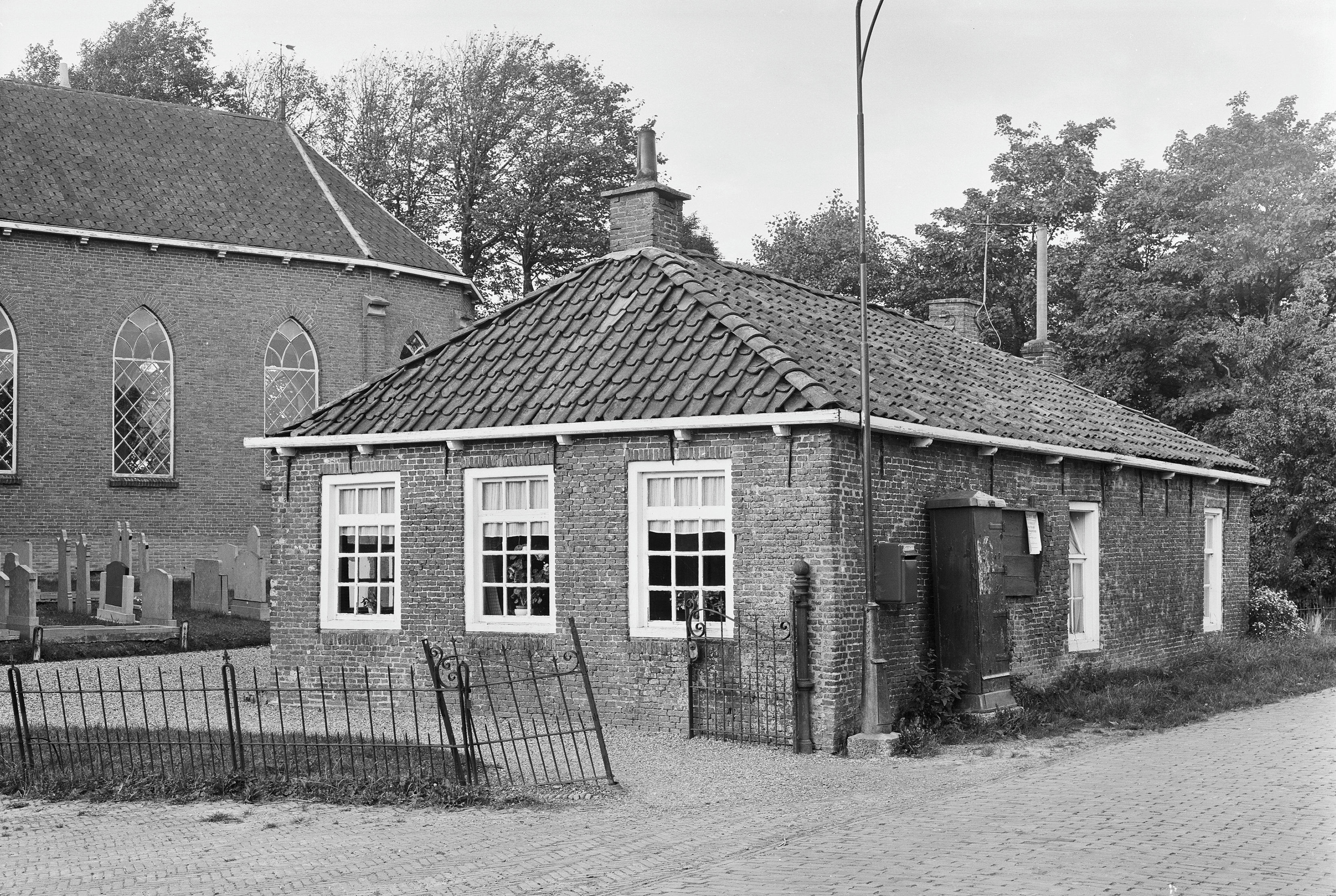

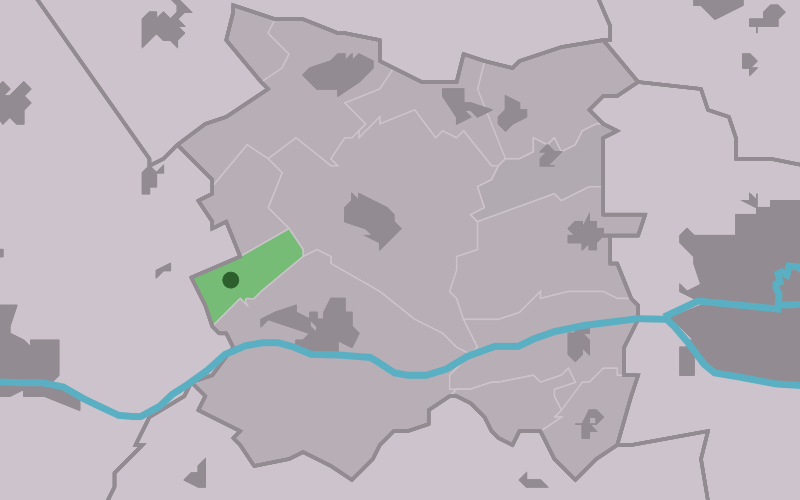
- Location in Menameradiel municipality

- Location in the Netherlands Schingen (Netherlands)
- Country: Netherlands
- Province: Friesland
- Municipality: Waadhoeke

Area
  - Total: 1.83 km^{2} (0.71 sq mi)
- Elevation: 0.5 m (1.6 ft)

Population (2021)
  - Total: 95
  - Density: 52/km^{2} (130/sq mi)
- Time zone: UTC+1 (CET)
  - Summer (DST): UTC+2 (CEST)
- Postal code: 8816
- Dialing code: 0517

Skingen (Dutch: Schingen) is a small village in Waadhoeke in the province of Friesland, the Netherlands. It had a population of around 115 in January 2017.

== History ==
The village was first mentioned around 1400 as Schengen, and is the name of a stream. Skingen developed at the beginning of our era on a natural height near the Middelzee. Archaeological artefacts have been discovered from the Roman period. Later the hill was extended into a terp (artificial living hill). A church had already been built in the 11th or 12th century when in 1877 work began on a new one. The church was restored in 2003.

Skingen was home to 109 people in 1840. Until 2018, the village was part of the Menameradiel municipality.

== Born in Skingen ==
- Pieter Breuker (1945), Frisian writer

== Gallery ==
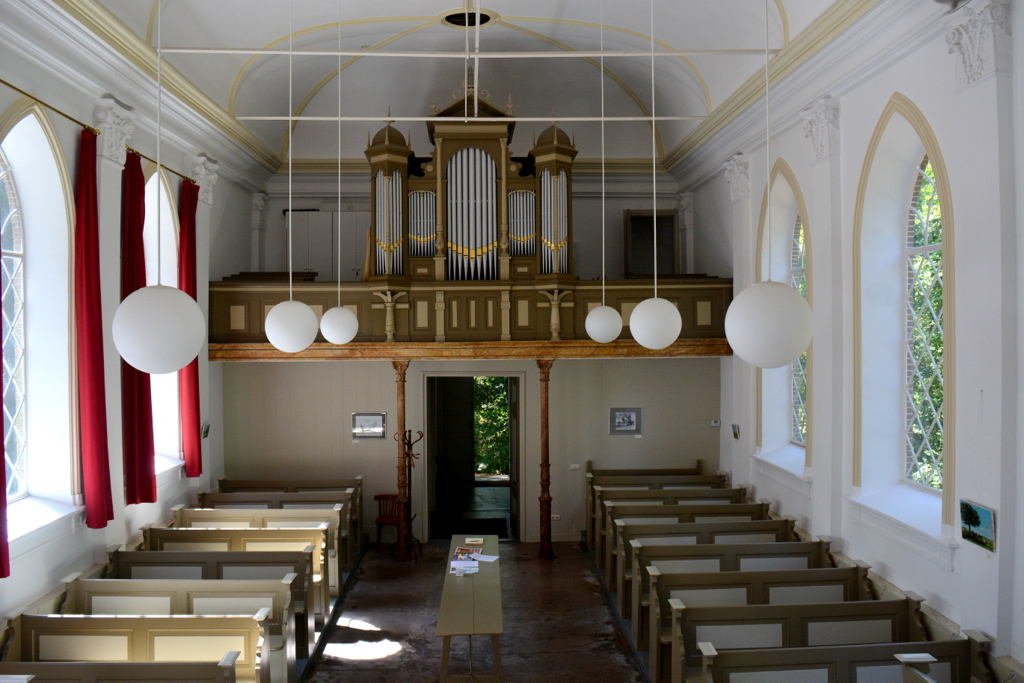
Interior of the church
