= Kleaster Anjum =

Kleaster Anjum Klooster Anjum
- Hamlet
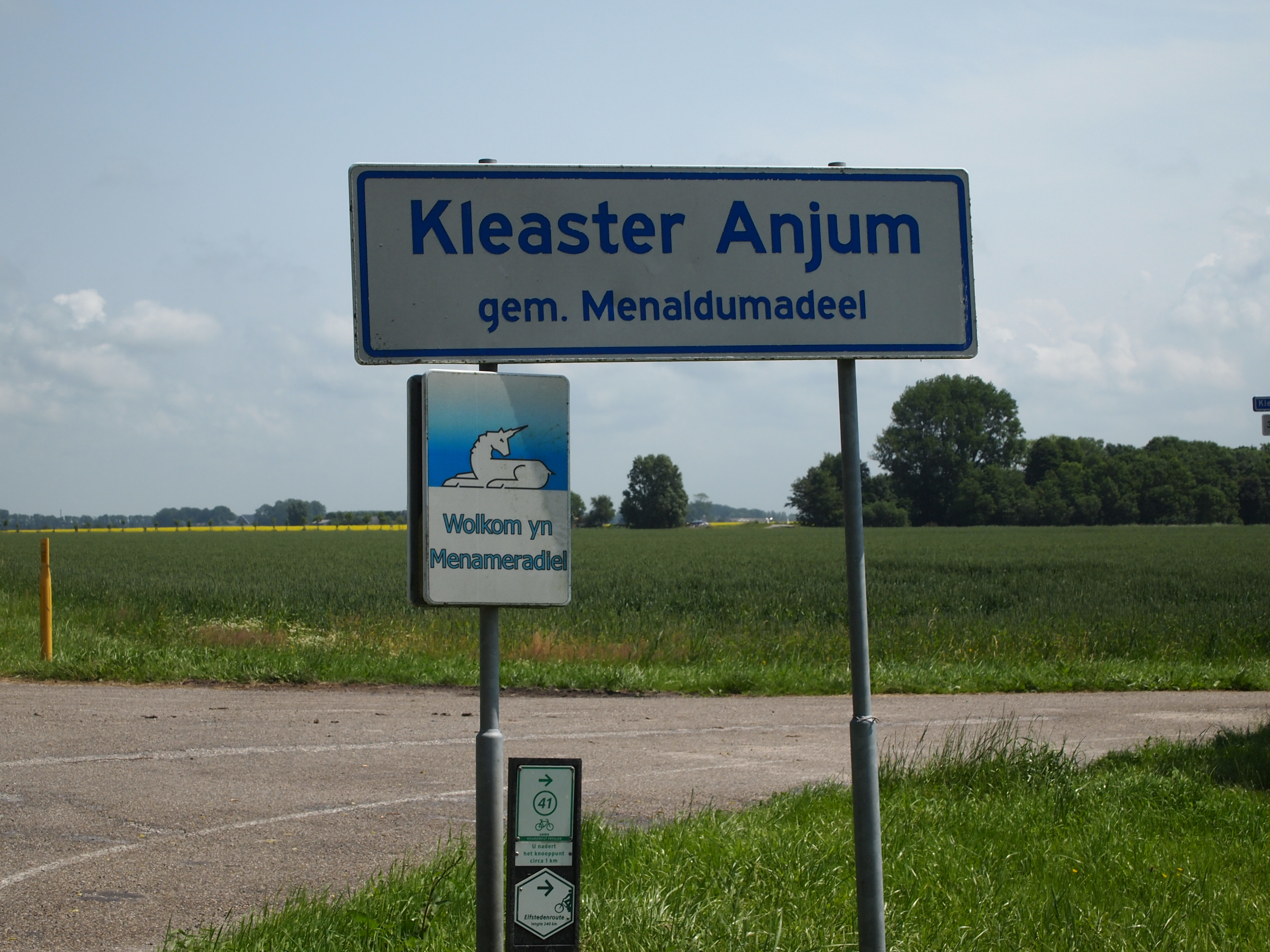
- Kleaster Anjum Entrance

- Location in the Netherlands Kleaster Anjum (Netherlands)
- Coordinates: 53.231°N 5.614°E
- Country: Netherlands
- Province: Friesland
- Municipality: Waadhoeke
- Time zone: UTC+1 (CET)
  - Summer (DST): UTC+2 (CEST)
- Postal code: 9041
- Dialing code: 0518

Kleaster Anjum or Kleaster Eanjum (Dutch: Klooster Anjum or Anjum) is a hamlet in Waadhoeke in the province of Friesland, the Netherlands. Until 1963, it had a status of village.

Kleaster Anjum is not a statistical entity, and the postal authorities have placed it under Berltsum. The hamlet has place name signs. The hamlet was first mentioned in 1275 as Aninghum. Kleaster (monastery) has been added to distinguish from Anjum. The monastery Maria's Berg was founded at the site around 1256. It was dissolved in 1580.

Kleaster Anjum was home to 60 people in 1840. Nowadays, it consists of about 20 houses.
