= Menameradiel =

Menameradiel Menaldumadeel
- Former municipality
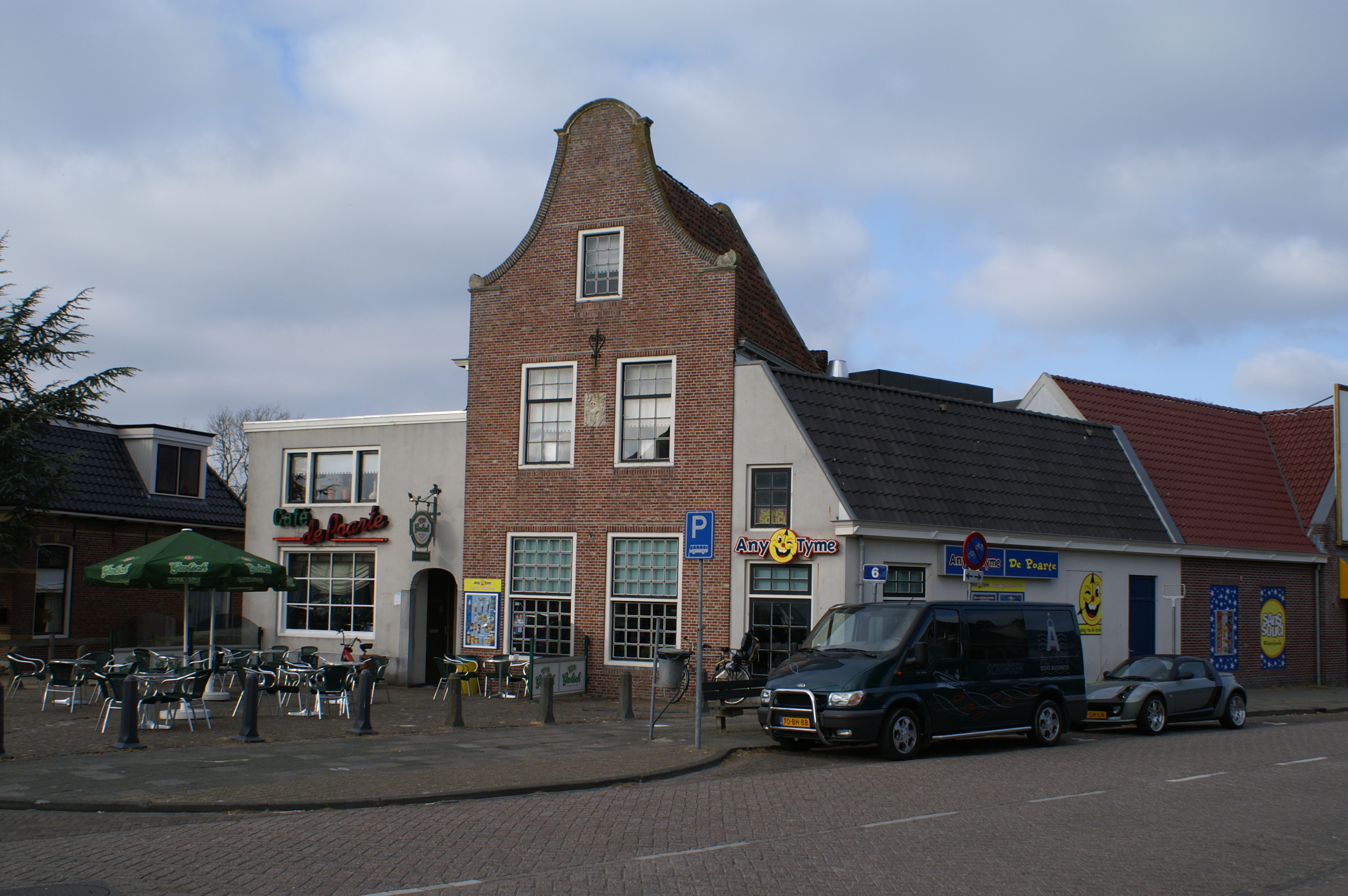
- Town square in Berlikum

- Flag Coat of arms

- Location in Friesland
- Coordinates: 53°13′N 5°40′E
- Country: Netherlands
- Province: Friesland
- Municipality: Waadhoeke

Area
  - Total: 70.03 km^{2} (27.04 sq mi)
  - Land: 68.87 km^{2} (26.59 sq mi)
  - Water: 1.16 km^{2} (0.45 sq mi)
- Elevation: 1 m (3.3 ft)

Population (January 2021)
  - Total: data missing
- Time zone: UTC+1 (CET)
  - Summer (DST): UTC+2 (CEST)
- Postcode: 8816, 9030–9045
- Area code: 0517, 0518, 058
- Website: www.menaldumadeel.nl

Menameradiel (West Frisian: [məˈnaːməraˌdiəl]; Dutch: Menaldumadeel [meːˈnɑldʏmaːˌdeːl]) is a former municipality in Friesland, Netherlands. On 1 January 2018 it merged with the municipalities of Franekeradeel, het Bildt and parts of Littenseradiel to form the new municipality Waadhoeke.

== Population centres ==
Population centres as of 1 January 2007:

- Beetgum (754)
- Beetgumermolen (944)
- Berlikum (2,492)
- Blessum (92)
- Boksum (449)
- Deinum (1,071)
- Dronryp (3,427)
- Engelum (415)
- Kleaster-Anjum (50)
- Marssum (1,156)
- Menaam (2,612)
- Schingen (108)
- Slappeterp (80)
- Wier (207).

=== Topography ===
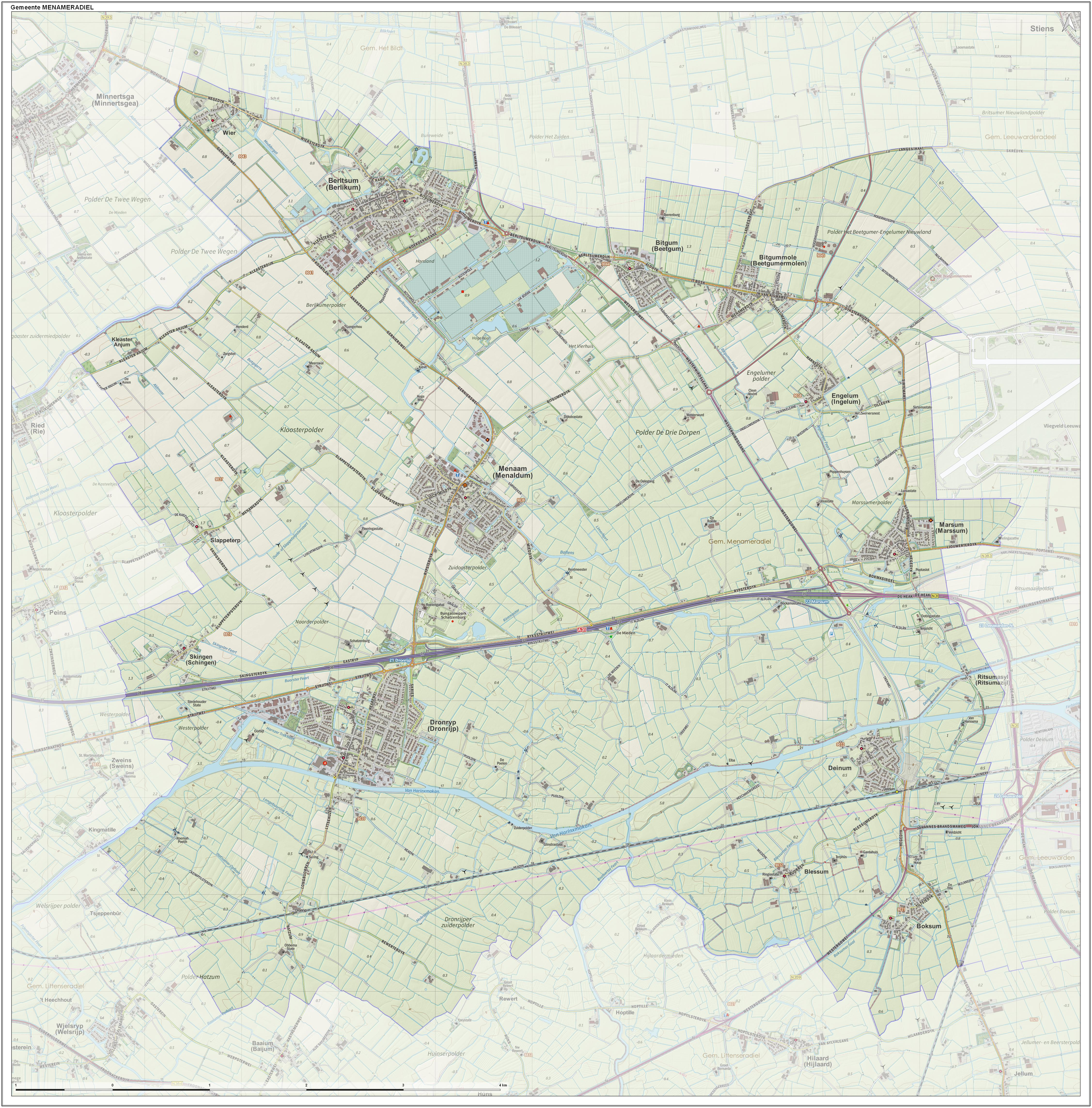

Dutch Topographic map of the former municipality of Menaldumadeel, June 2015
