= Slappeterp =

- Village
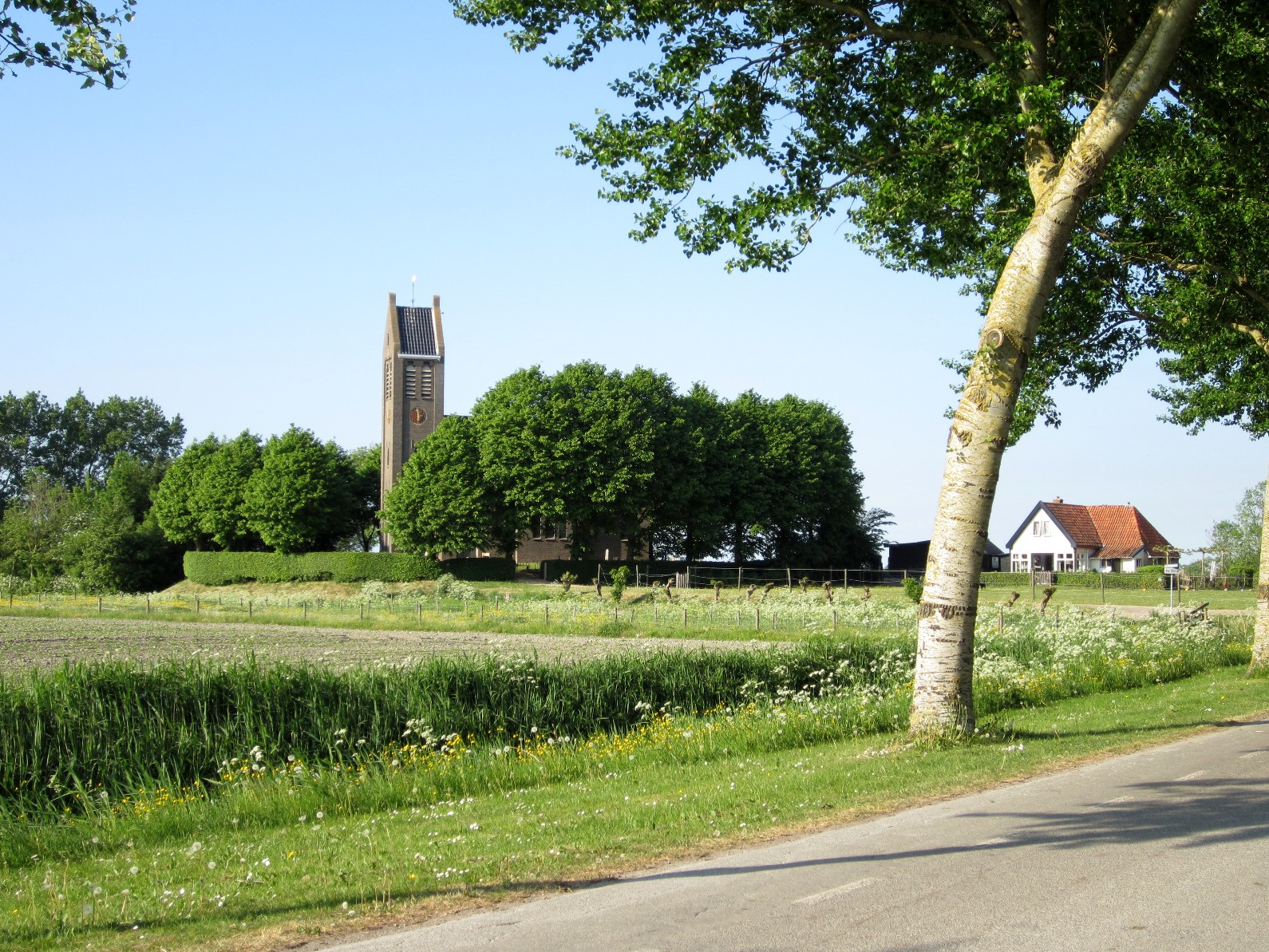

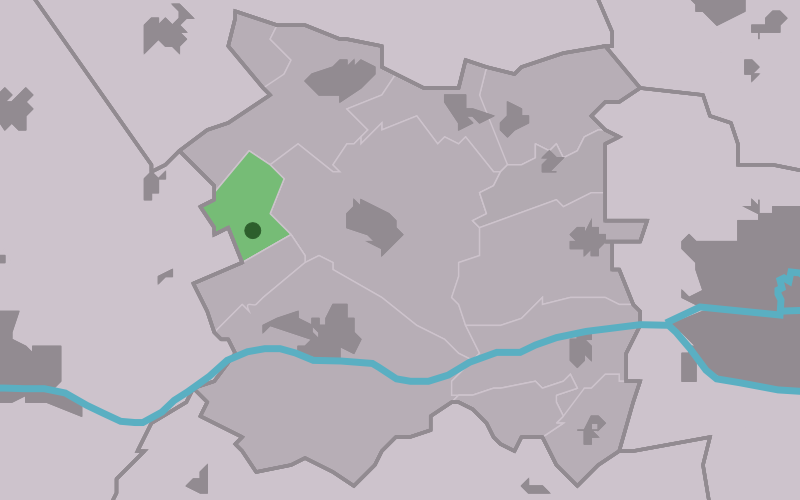
- Location in Menameradiel municipality

- Location in the Netherlands Slappeterp (Netherlands)
- Country: Netherlands
- Province: Friesland
- Municipality: Waadhoeke

Area
  - Total: 2.52 km^{2} (0.97 sq mi)
- Elevation: 0.9 m (3.0 ft)

Population (2021)
  - Total: 90
  - Density: 36/km^{2} (92/sq mi)
- Time zone: UTC+1 (CET)
  - Summer (DST): UTC+2 (CEST)
- Postal code: 9037
- Dialing code: 0518

Slappeterp is a small village in Waadhoeke municipality in the province of Friesland, the Netherlands. It had a population of around 85 in January 2017.

== History ==
The village was first mentioned in the 13th century Clepesdor. The etymology is unclear. Slappeterp is a terp (artificial living hill) village from the beginning of our era. It is an agricultural community. The village is connected to the Harlingertrekvaart via a canal.

The Dutch Reformed church was built in 1926 as a replacement of an earlier church. The church was designed by Hendrik Hendriks Kramer and has expressionistic details.

Slappeterp was home to 113 people in 1840. Until 2018, the village was part of the Menameradiel municipality.
