= Bitgum =

- Village
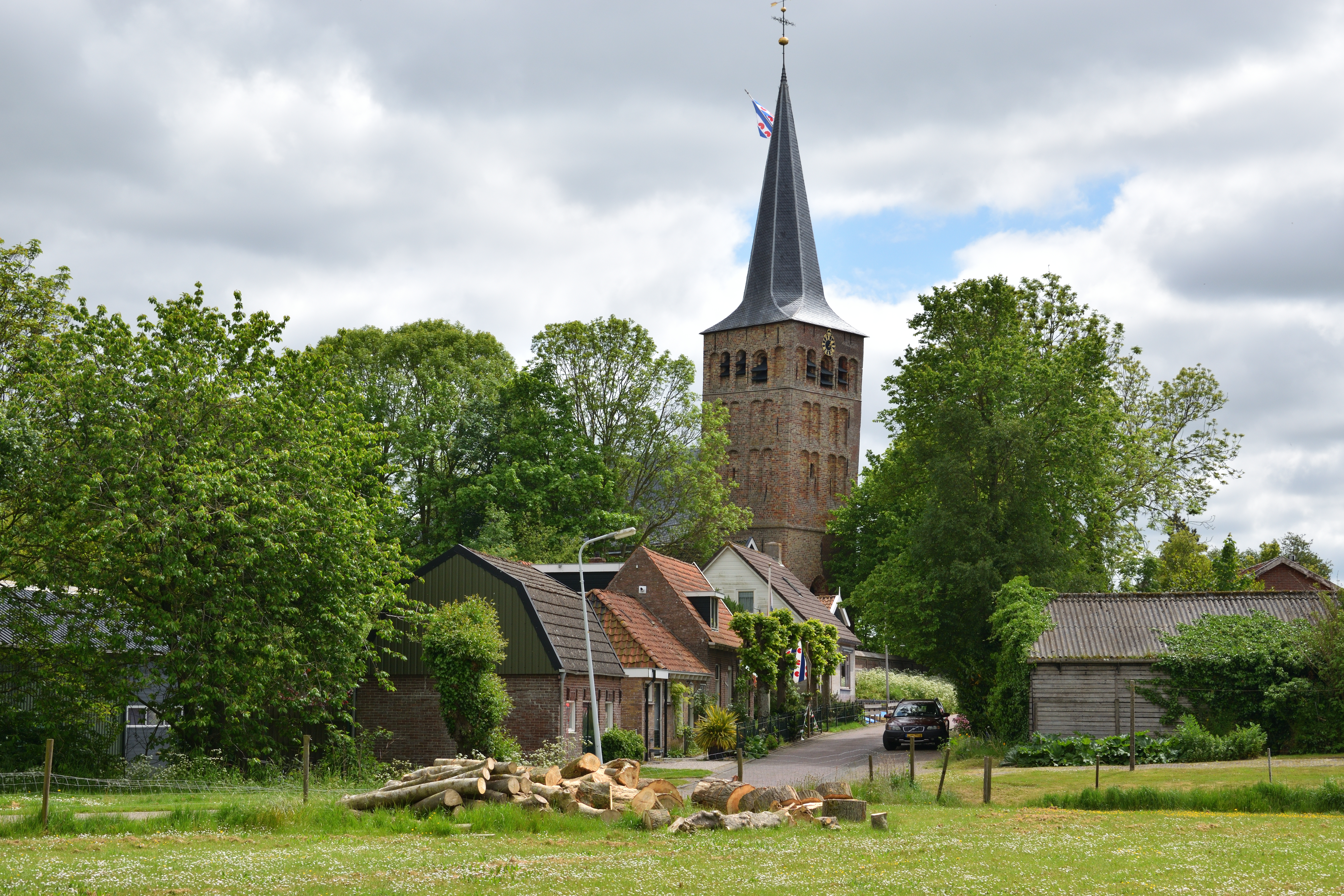
- Bitgum

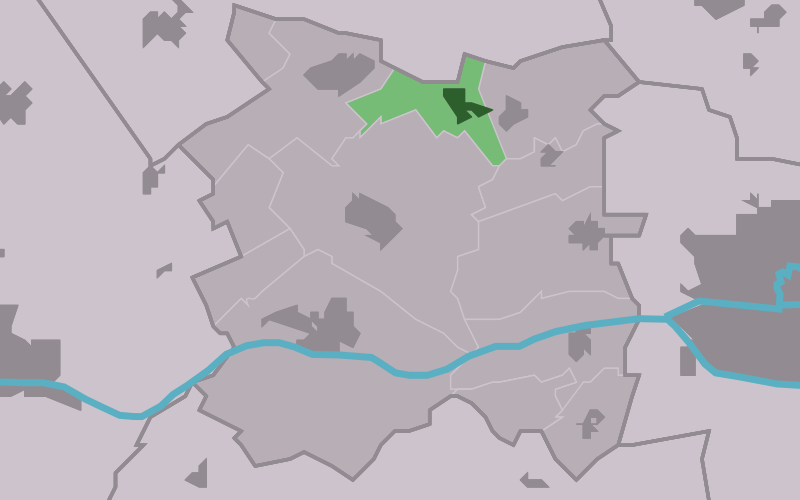
- Location in Menameradiel municipality

- Location in the Netherlands Bitgum (Netherlands)
- Country: Netherlands
- Province: Friesland
- Municipality: Waadhoeke

Area
  - Total: 2.52 km^{2} (0.97 sq mi)
- Elevation: 0.7 m (2.3 ft)

Population (2021)
  - Total: 800
  - Density: 320/km^{2} (820/sq mi)
- Time zone: UTC+1 (CET)
  - Summer (DST): UTC+2 (CEST)
- Postal code: 9044
- Dialing code: 058

Bitgum (Dutch: Beetgum) is a village in Waadhoeke municipality in the province of Friesland in the Netherlands. It had a population of around 792 in January 2017.

== History ==
Before 2018, the village was part of the Menameradiel municipality. Bitgum gained notoriety in 1895, when three brothers from the village (Keimpe, Wybren and Marten Hogerhuis) were arrested for their alleged and disputed involvement in a burglary in the village of Britsum. The involvement of the Social Democrat Party's leader, Pieter Jelles Troelstra two years later, catapulted the village into the national headlines.

== Aircraft crash ==
On June 9, 2016, a demonstration fighter jet crashed in the lake next to 'De bodde', the pilot saved himself by ejecting from the aircraft.

== Gallery ==
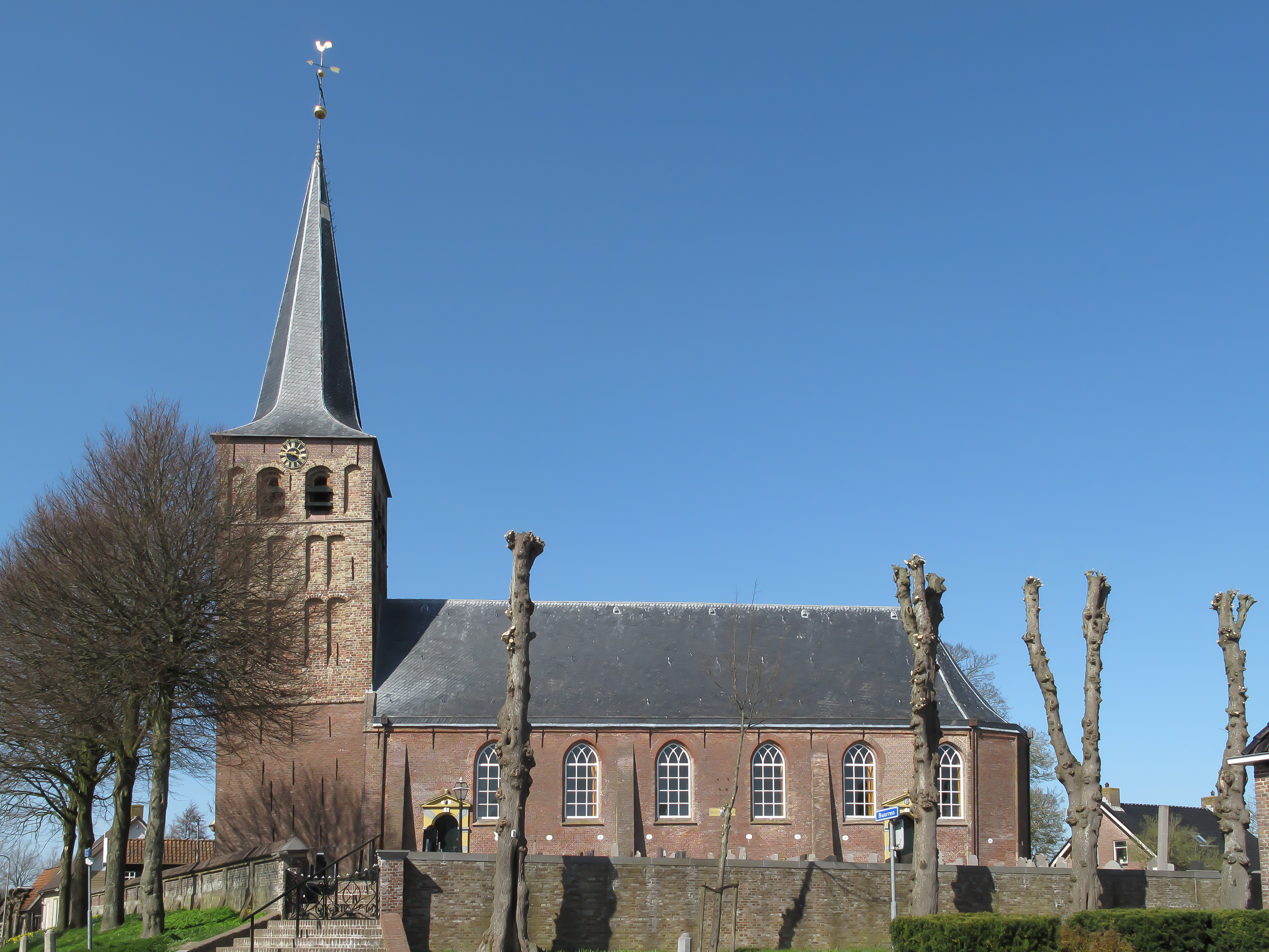
Church

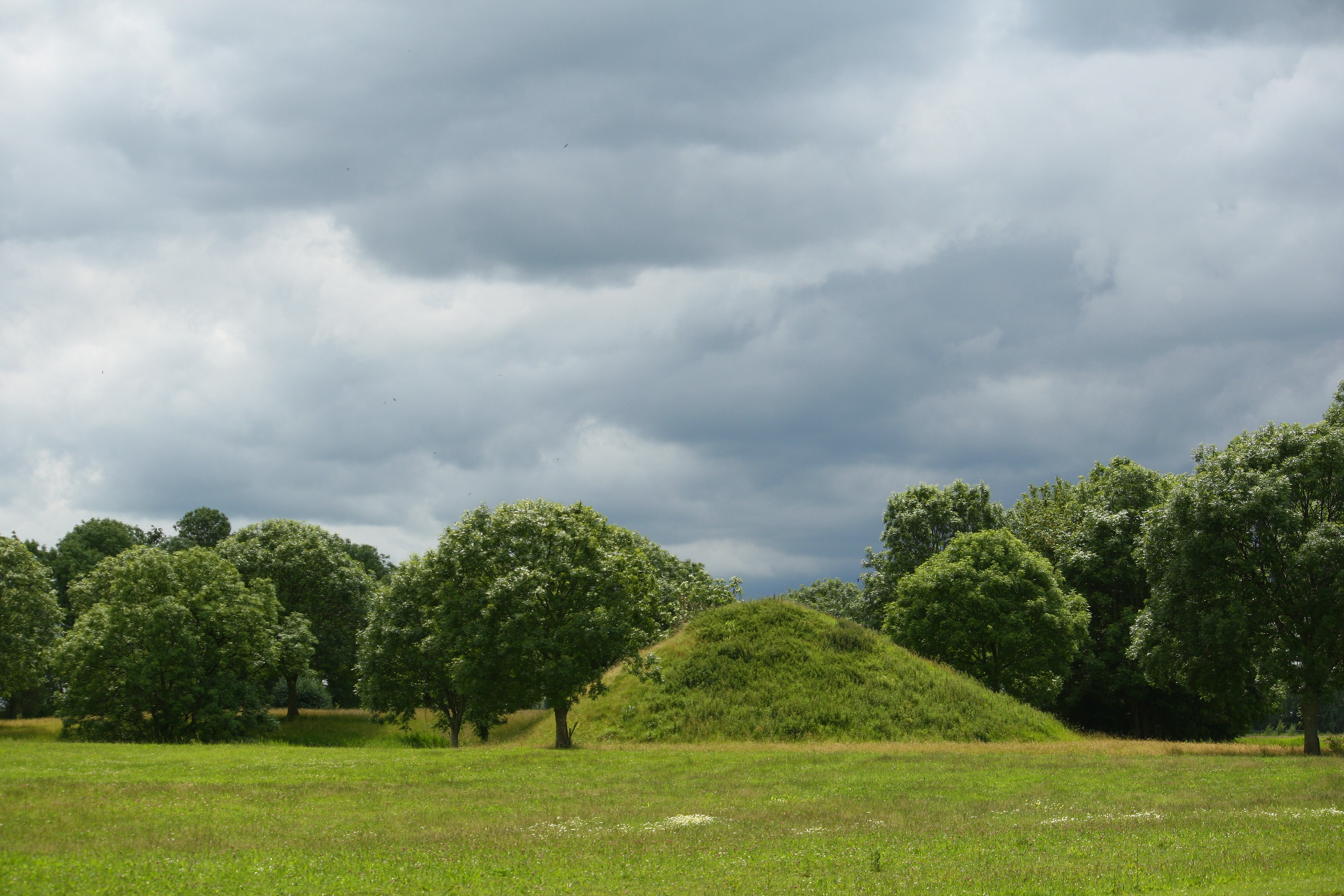
Bitgum's "Hege Wier", remains of one of 5 stins, or medieval castles in Friesland
