= Britsum =

- Village
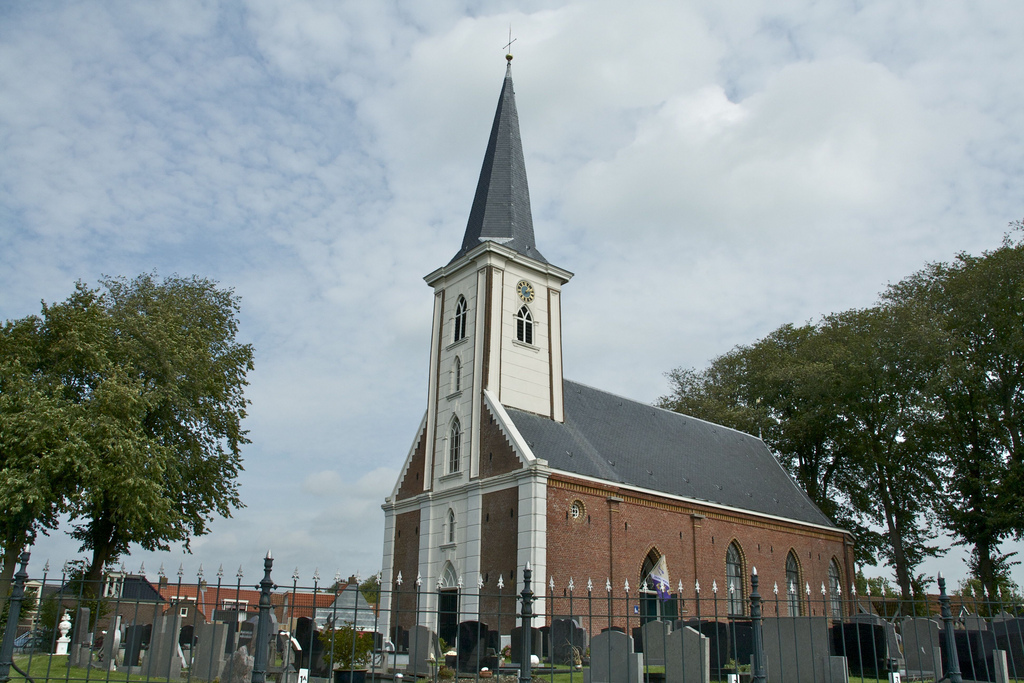
- St John's Church

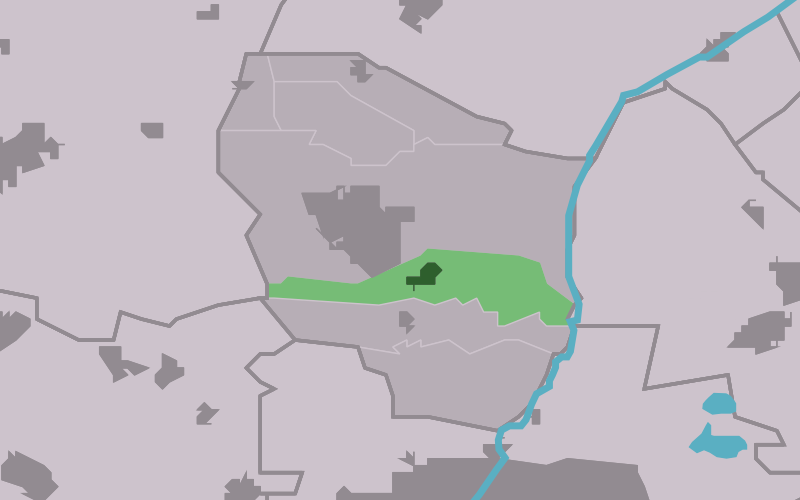
- Location in Leeuwarderadeel municipality

- Location in the Netherlands Britsum (Netherlands)
- Country: Netherlands
- Province: Friesland
- Municipality: Leeuwarden

Area
  - Total: 4.98 km^{2} (1.92 sq mi)
- Elevation: 0.4 m (1.3 ft)

Population (2021)
  - Total: 950
  - Density: 190/km^{2} (490/sq mi)
- Time zone: UTC+1 (CET)
  - Summer (DST): UTC+2 (CEST)
- Postal code: 9055
- Dialing code: 058

Britsum is a village in the municipality of Leeuwarden (province of Friesland), in the Netherlands. Britsum was built on an artificial bank (terp) running along the eastern side of the former Middelzee. The church, built around 1300, is also located on this bank. It had a population of about 910 inhabitants in January 2017.

== History ==
It was first mentioned in 944 as Bruggiheim, and means "settlement near a bridge". Britsum is a terp (artificial living mound) village with a radial structure. It dates from the early Middle Ages and was built near the Middelzee. A large part of the mound was excavated around 1900.

The western side of the Dutch Reformed church dates between 1180 and 1200. The nave and choir date between 1240 and 1260. The church received its present shape in 1875. In 1840, Britsum was home to 326 people.

Britsum was served by a station on the North Friesland Railway which opened in 1901 and closed to passengers in December 1940. The line finally closed in 1997.

Before 2018, the village was part of the Leeuwarderadeel municipality.

== Gallery ==
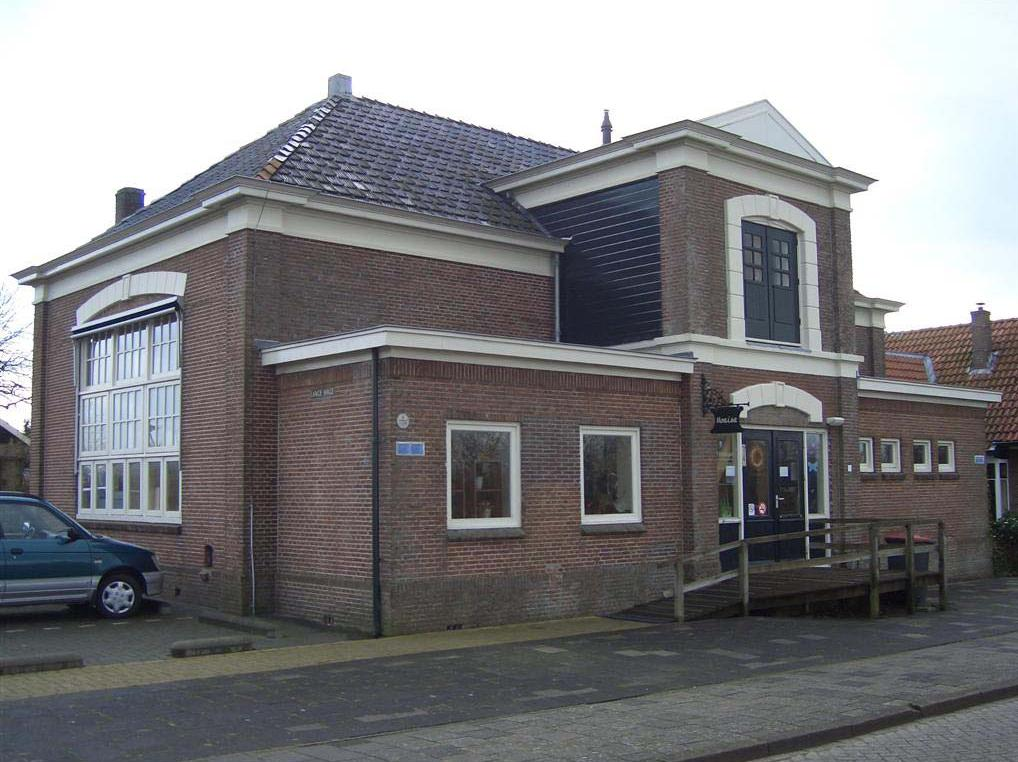
Former school building

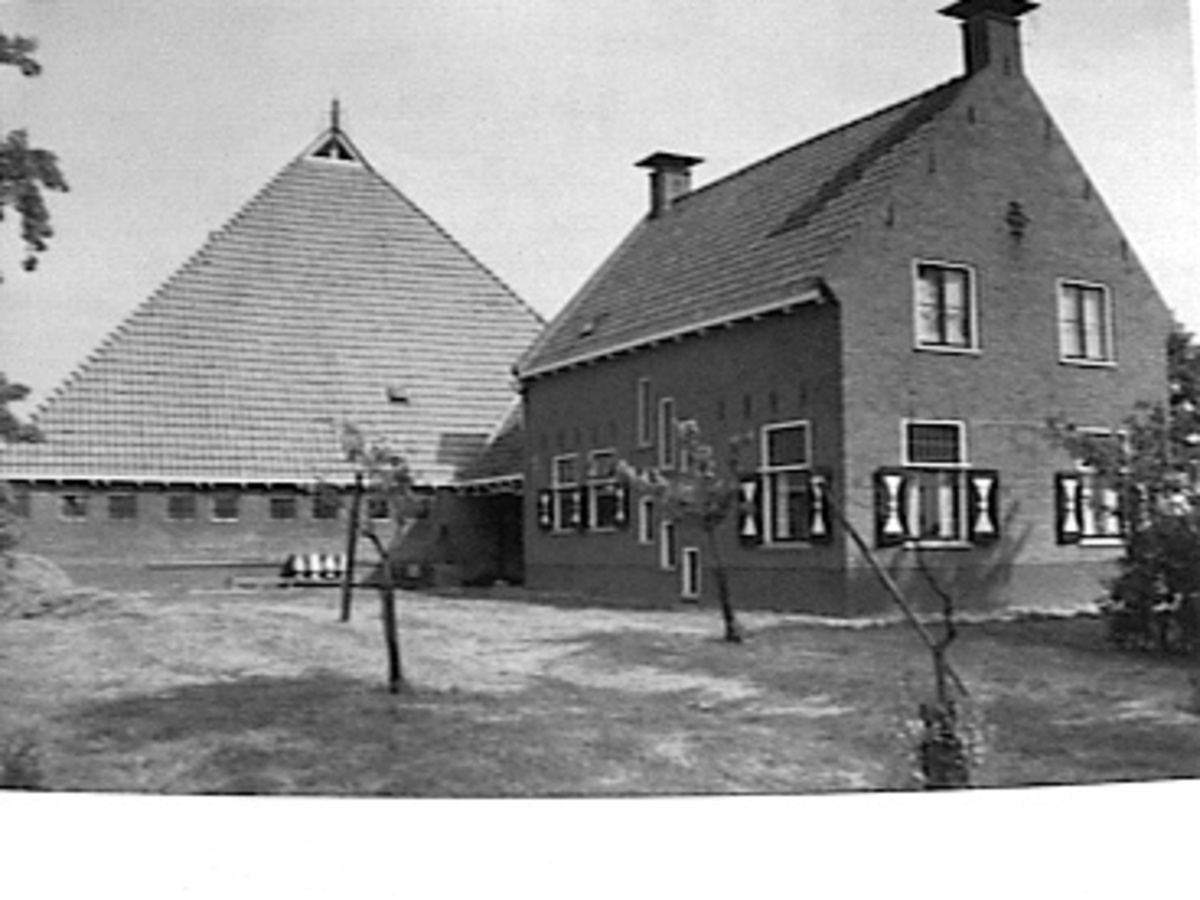
Farm in Britsum

== Notable people ==
- Joost Klein (born 1997), musician, Dutch entrant in the 2024 Eurovision Song Contest
