= Berltsum =

Berltsum Berlikum
- Village
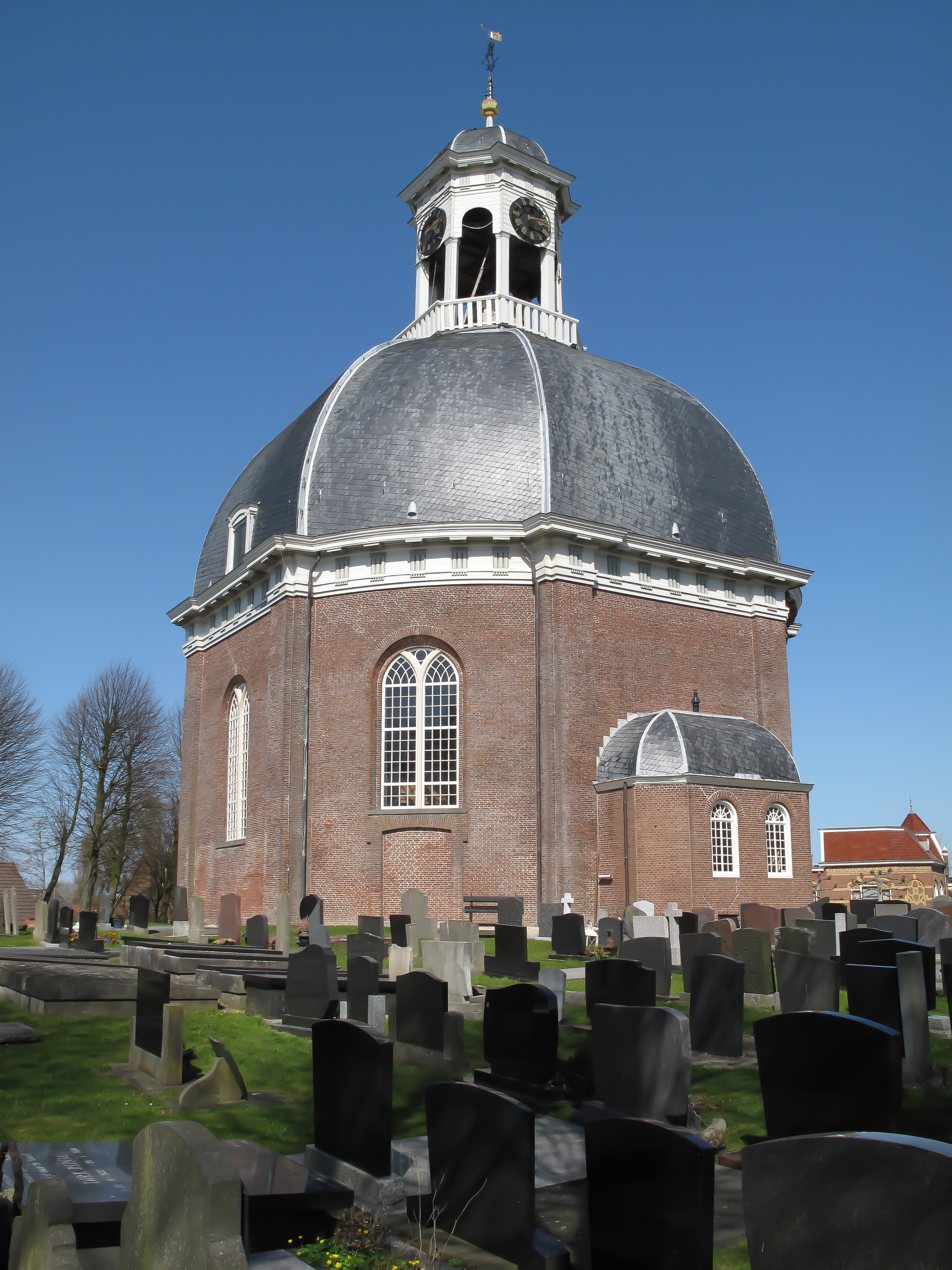
- Berltsum church

- Flag Coat of arms

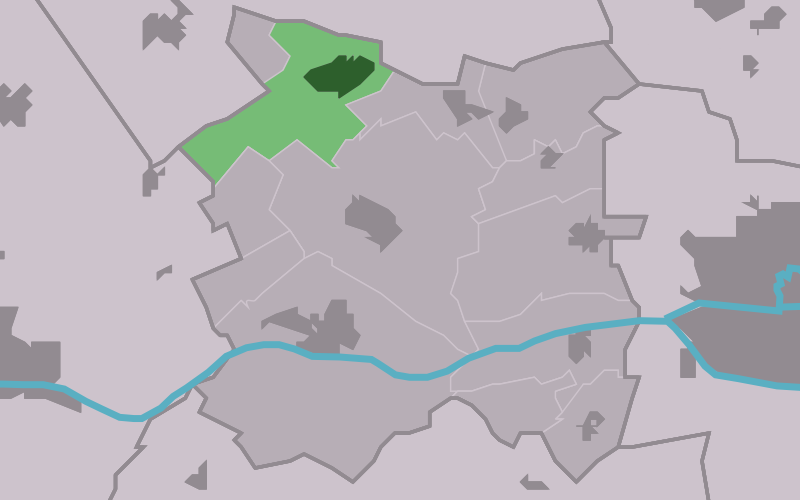
- Location in Menameradiel municipality

- Location in the Netherlands Berltsum (Netherlands)
- Country: Netherlands
- Province: Friesland
- Municipality: Waadhoeke

Area
  - Total: 7.19 km^{2} (2.78 sq mi)
- Elevation: 0.3 m (0.98 ft)

Population (2021)
  - Total: 2,575
  - Density: 358/km^{2} (928/sq mi)
- Time zone: UTC+1 (CET)
  - Summer (DST): UTC+2 (CEST)
- Postal code: 9041
- Dialing code: 0518
- Website: Official

Berltsum (Dutch: Berlikum) is a village in Waadhoeke municipality in the province of Friesland, the Netherlands. It had a population of around 2,529 in January 2017. Until 2018, the village was part of the Menameradiel municipality.

== History ==
The village was first mentioned in 1355 as Berlichem, and means "settlement of the people of Berilo (person)". The village of Tutingum or Tutgum which was located to the north probably merged into Berltsum in the 15th century, and the name disappeared in the 19th century. Berltsum developed as a terp (artificial living hill) village along the river Riedstroom several centuries before Christ. Berltsum was never a city, but did receive rights. In the 12th century, it was burnt down by the Vikings.

It developed into a centre of horticulture and fruit cultivation. The domed Dutch Reformed church was built between 1777 and 1779 as a replacement of its medieval predecessor. Mennonites were present in Berltsum as early of 1550, and used to have a clandestine church. In 1843, a church was built which could also be used a conference centre.

Berltsum was home to 1,310 people in 1840. At the end of the 19th century, Berltsum started to industrialize and in 1899, an auction was established.

== Gallery ==
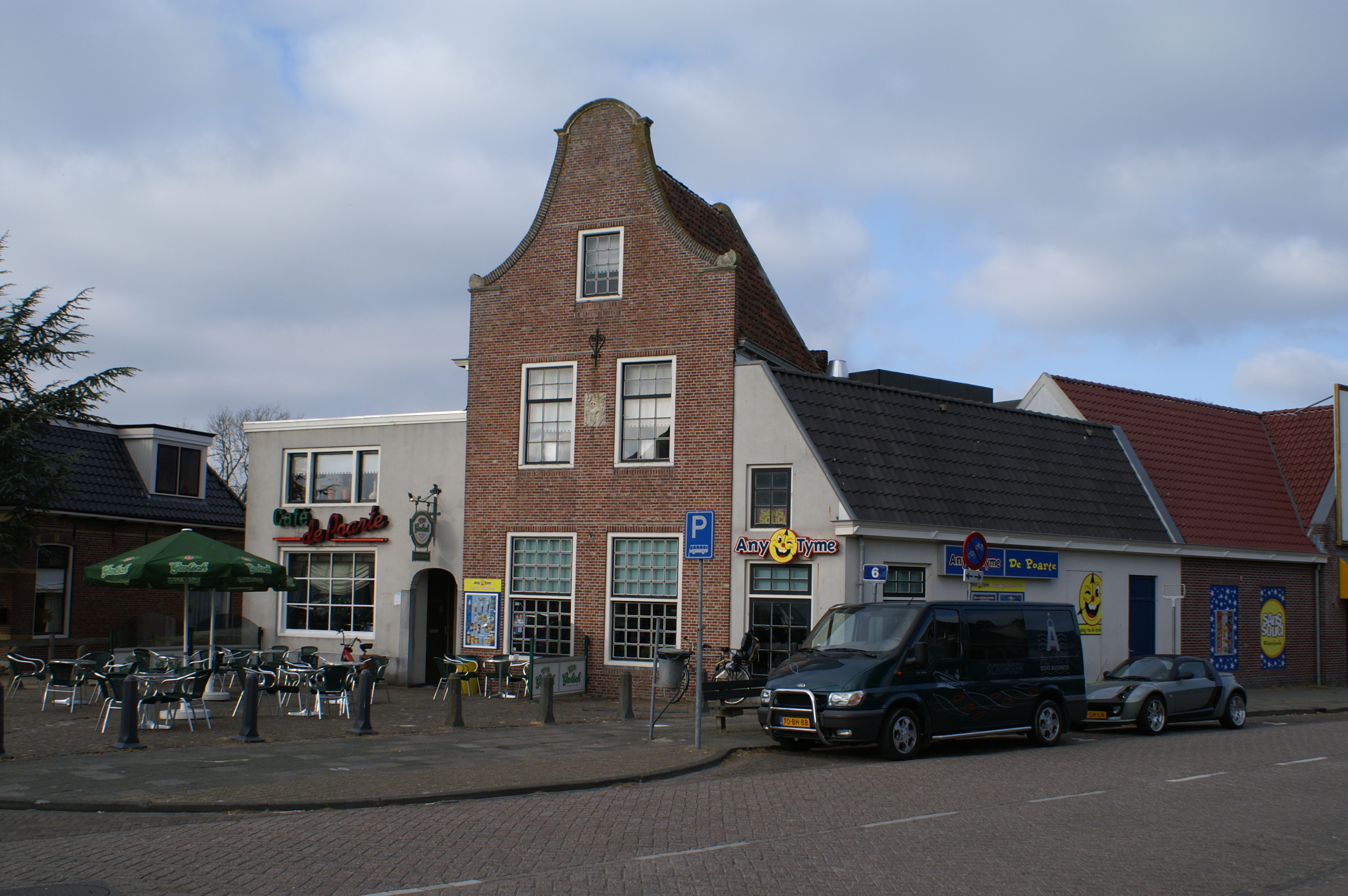
Pub in Beltsum

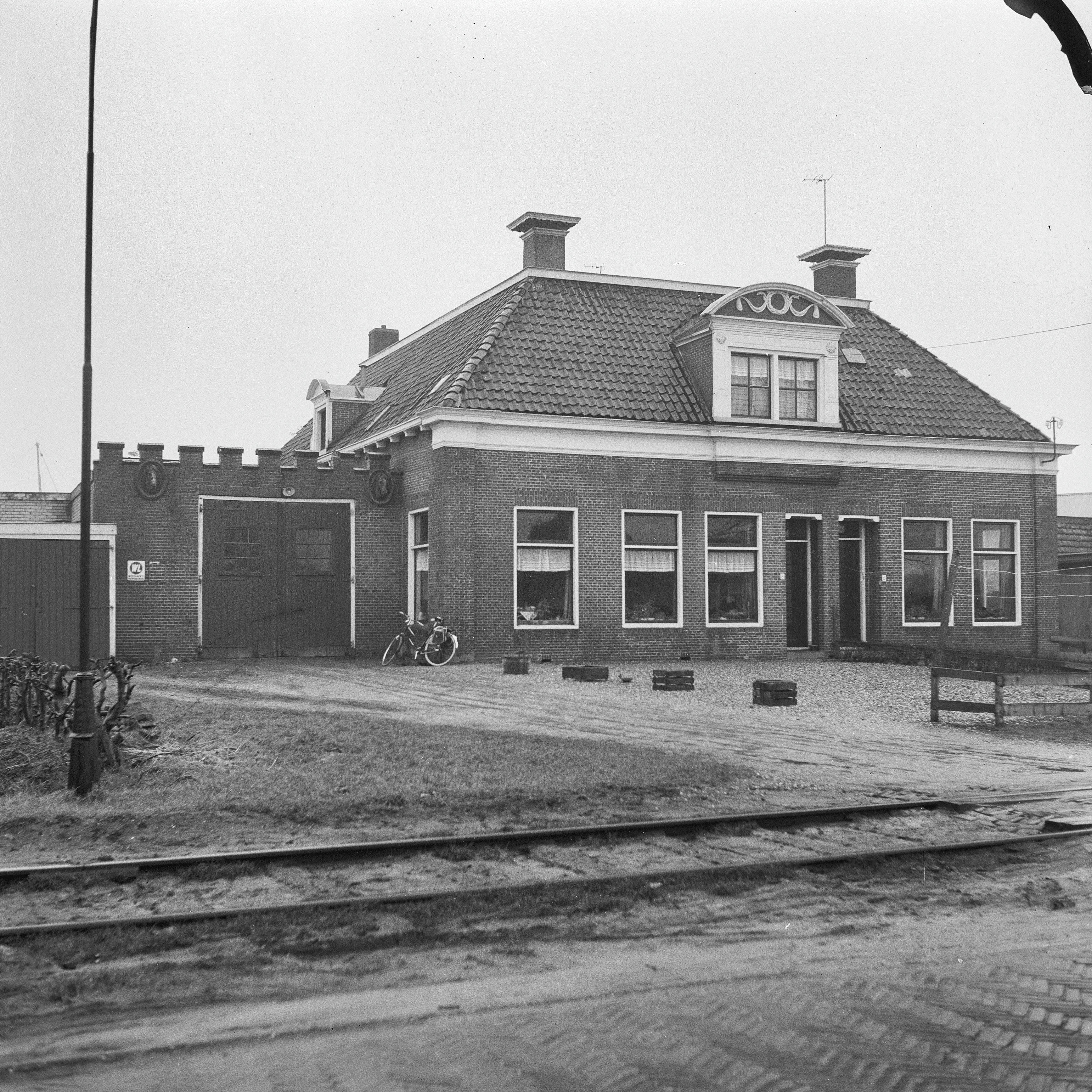
House with tram rails (1966)

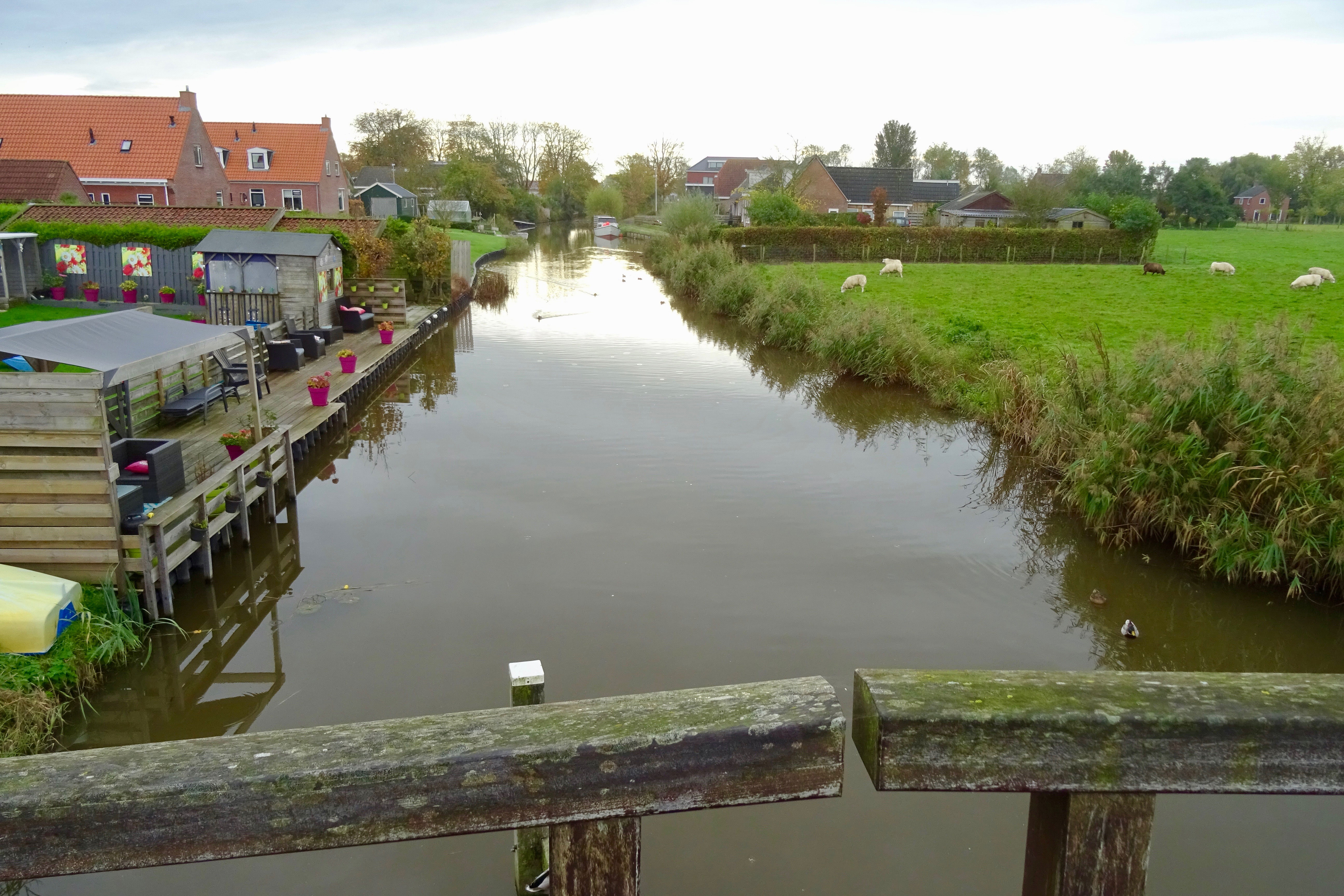
Canal view

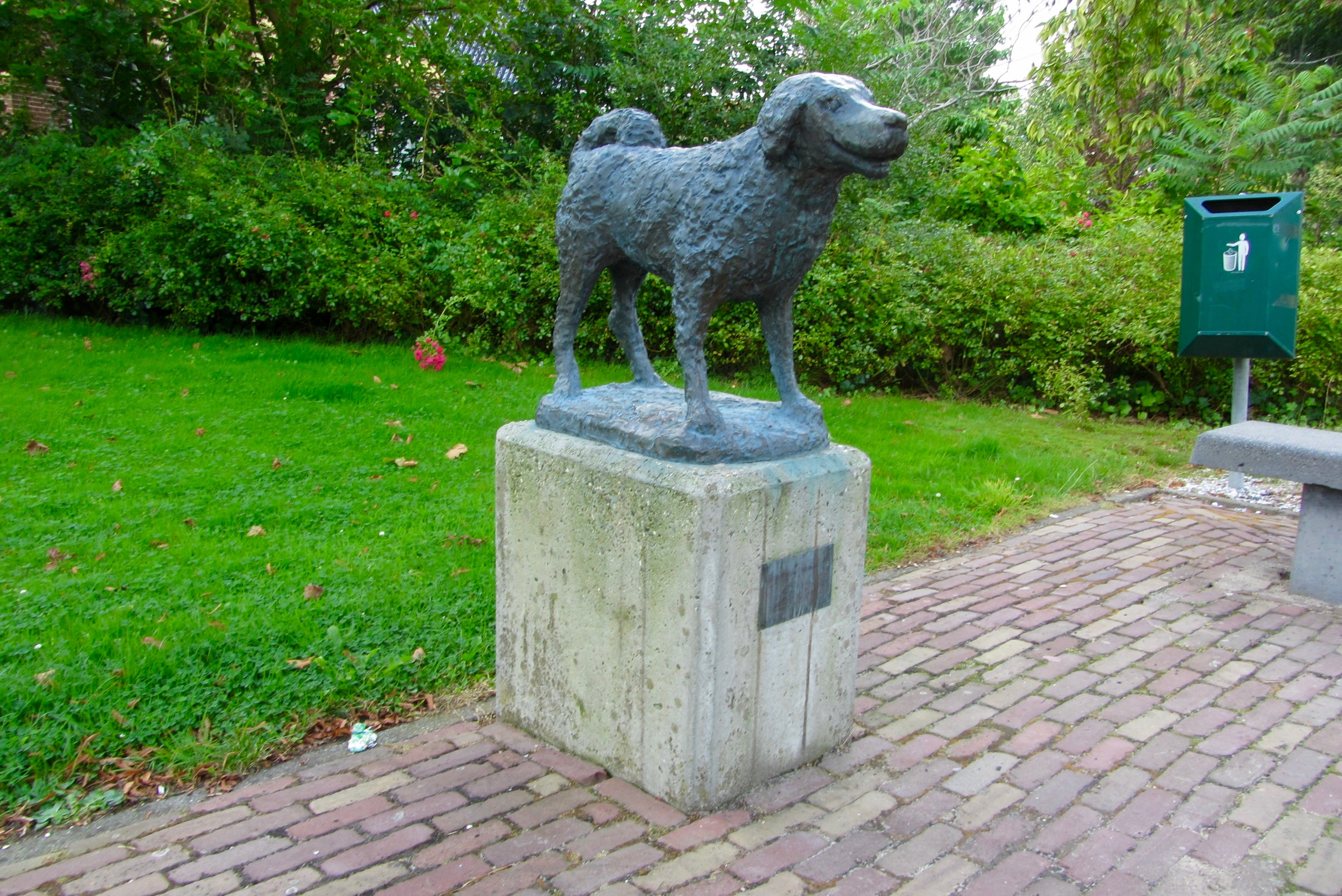
Wetterhoun statue
