= Middelzee =

Former estuary in Frisia

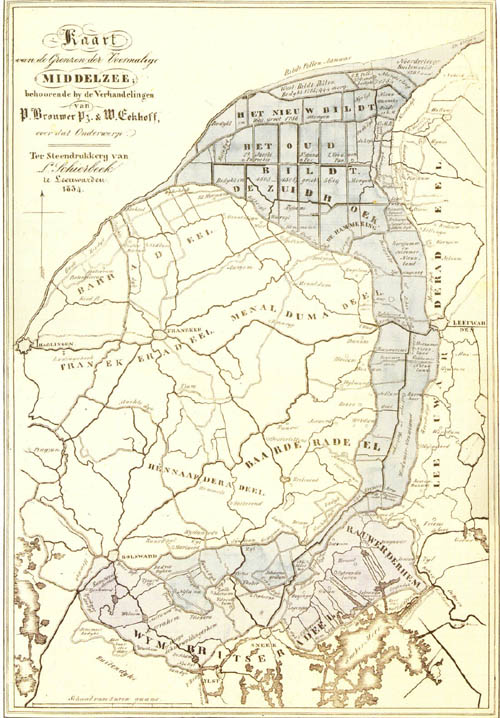
An 1834 map of the former Middelzee

The Middelzee (Dutch for "middle sea"; West Frisian: Middelsee), also called Bordine, was the estuary mouth of the River Boorne (West Frisian: Boarn) now in the Dutch province of Friesland. It ran from as far south as Sneek northward to the Wadden Sea and marked the border between main Frisian regions of Westergoa (Westergo) and Eastergoa (Oostergo). Other historical names for the Middelzee include Bordaa, Borndiep, Boerdiep, and Bordena. The names like Bordine, mean "border".

== Pre-history ==
Back in the Pleistocene the Boorne was a river that had a drainage basin in Friesland, Drenthe, and Groningen. It flowed from Saalien glacial till plateau in a southwest direction, and met the sea west of Het Bildt. The Boorne passed the current location of Akkrum and Rauwerd. The connection to the Wadden Sea became blocked by sand dunes in the Weichselian time period, and the mouth of the river was forced more and more easterly, until it was heading in a north-northwest direction from Akkrum. In the Holocene, the sea rose flooding the valley to form an estuary. Before 7000 years ago, the sea was rising at a rate of 0.75 meters per century, and the rising sea was faster than the sedimentation There are still estuary sediments west of Jorwerd, that were deposited during 6400-5300 before present (Mid-Atlantic). By 5500 years ago, sea level rise slowed down to a rate of 0.15 meters per century. This allowed sedimentation to catch up and fill in the estuary. Tidal inlets further to the west were blocked by sediment by 3300 years ago. However the Boorne remained open and gradually eroded further and further south and then branched west south of what is now Westergo. People started living adjacent to the channels about 600 BC. The tidal channel moved to the east to what would become the Middelzee. Before the year 900, the new tidal channel scoured deeper and deeper and flooding extended even further inland. After 900 the flooding reached its maximum extent, and it became known as the Middelzee. The southwestern extremity joined up with the Marne Estuary near Bolsward.

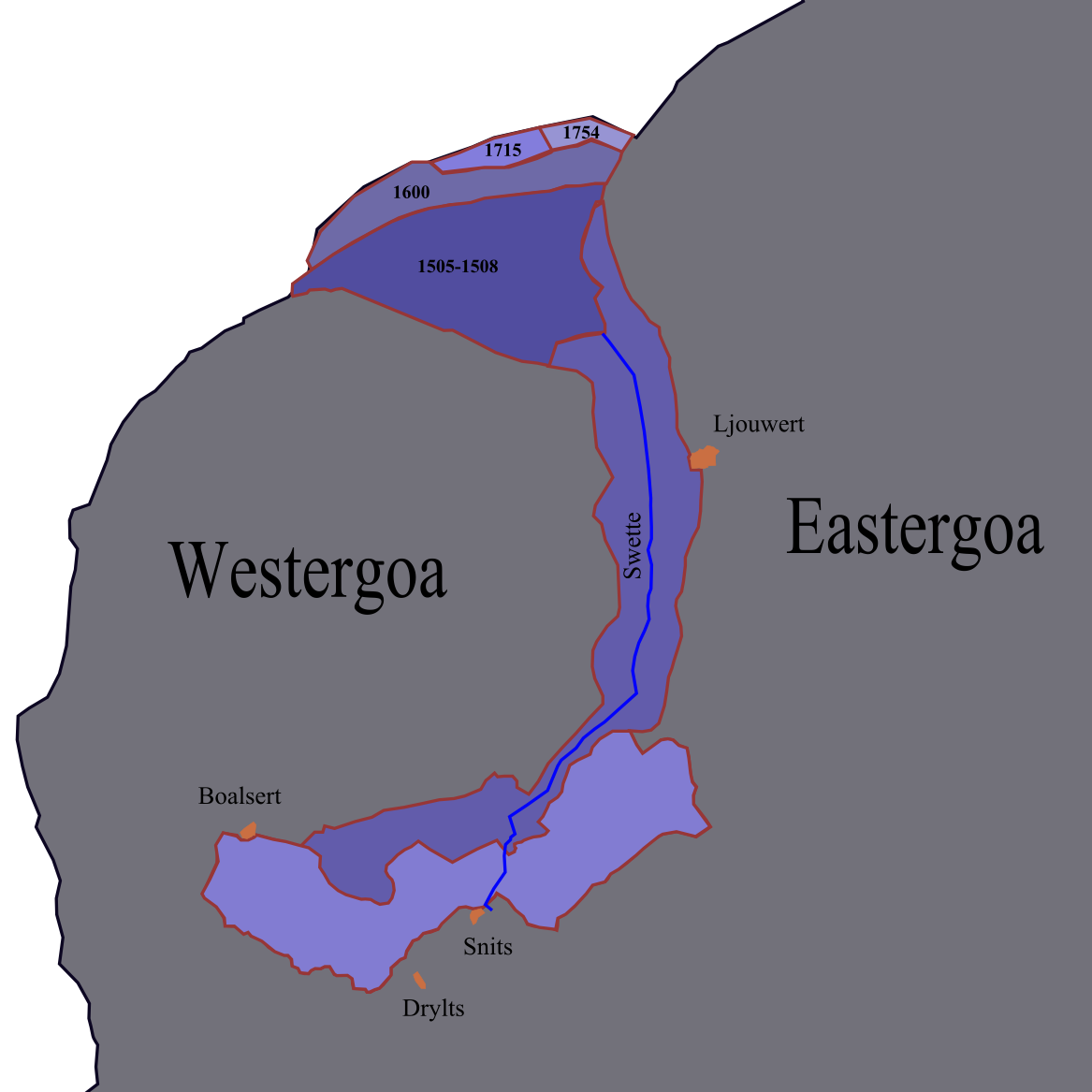
Map of the former Middelzee in West Frisian showing dates of land reclamation

== Reclamation ==
At the beginning of the 10th century, people became more organised and worked to prevent the further encroachment of the Middelzee. Levees and natural marsh bars were raised along the shore north of Steins on the western coast of Oostergo. This also happened on the north west facing coast of Westergo along the Reid. During the 10th century a dyke was established along the east coast of Westergo along the coast of the Middelzee. The mother polders were established as regions of land completely encircled by dykes.

The southwestern arm of the Middelzee was progressively sectioned off by building dykes across the arm, in four stages. Around 1200 AD a dyke near Rauwerd finished the closure of the arm. This turned what was a mud flat into a salt marsh, and silt gradually collected to fill the areas in.

The northern section of the Middelzee, passing Leeuwarden was dyked off in the first half of the 13th century, and by 1300 it was reclaimed up to Stiens and Bitgum. The 12th century also saw land reclamation along the north west shore of Oostergo, shrinking the funnel shaped part of the Middelzee.

Leeuwarden and the trading terp villages along the coast of Middelzee lost their ability to trade with watercraft when they became isolated from the route to the Wadden Zee.

Gradually the Middelzee silted up, forming the nije lannen ("new lands"). One village is called Nijlân, literally meaning "new land", and also there are several villages where the lands formerly of the Middelzee are still called it Nijlân. It can still be recognized as new land since there are only a small number of villages lying in the area of the former Middelzee. The fertile sea clay bottom is mostly used as meadow land but also Leeuwarden Air Base is situated on the new lands. The border between Eastergoa and Westergoa in the former Middelzee is now drained by the River Zwette (West Frisian: Swette), that runs from Sneek to Leeuwarden, but which once reached the southern edge of Het Bildt.

By the fifteenth century the Middelzee was reduced to a funnel shape along Frisia's north coast and further silting of the remaining part rendered it unusable. From the early sixteenth century, the polder of Het Bildt was formed in that funnel, and is now a Frisian municipality that fills the mouth of what once was the Middelzee.

The name Middelzee is still used as a name for an administrative coalition of the so-called Middelzee municipalities of Het Bildt, Ferwerderadiel, Leeuwarderadeel, and Menameradiel.

== Extra reading ==
- Brouwer, Petrus; Eekhoff, Wopke (1834). Nasporingen betrekkelijk de geschiedenis der voormalige Middelzee in Friesland (in Dutch). L. Schierbeek.
