= List of cities, towns and villages in Friesland =

This is a list of cities, towns and villages in the province of Friesland, in the Netherlands.

This is an almost complete list of Frisian towns, villages and neighbourhoods Places, whose name is used in West Frisian officially, are marked by the.

== A ==
Name	Municipality	Coordinates
Aalsum	Noardeast-Fryslân	53°20′N 6°00′E
Abbega	Súdwest-Fryslân	53°01′N 5°34′E
Abbegaasterketting	Súdwest-Fryslân	53°02′N 5°34′E
Abbengawier	Súdwest-Fryslân	53°04′N 5°47′E
Abbewier	Súdwest-Fryslân	53°23′N 6°09′E
Achlum	Waadhoeke	53°09′N 5°29′E
Aegum	Leeuwarden	53°08′N 5°50′E
Aekinga	Ooststellingwerf	52°57′N 6°19′E
Akkerwoude	Dantumadiel	53°17′N 5°59′E
Akkrum	Heerenveen	53°03′N 5°50′E
Akmarijp	De Fryske Marren	53°00′N 5°47′E
Allardsoog	Opsterland	53°06′N 6°18′E
Allingawier	Súdwest-Fryslân	53°03′N 5°27′E
Almenum	Harlingen	53°11′N 5°26′E
Anjum	Dongeradeel	53°14′N 5°39′E
Anjum	Dongeradeel	53°22′N 6°08′E
Anneburen	Heerenveen	53°04′N 5°37′E
Appelscha	Ooststellingwerf	52°57′N 6°22′E
Arkens	Waadhoeke	53°12′N 5°33′E
Arkum	Waadhoeke	53°02′N 5°30′E
Arum	Súdwest-Fryslân	53°08′N 5°29′E
Atzeburen	Súdwest-Fryslân	53°01′N 5°30′E
Augsbuurt-Lutjewoude	Kollumerland en Nieuwkruisland	53°16′N 6°10′E
Augustinusga	Achtkarspelen	53°13′N 6°10′E
Aalzum	Dongeradeel	53°20′N 6°00′E

== B ==
Name	Municipality	Coordinates
Baaiduinen	Terschelling	53°23′N 5°17′E
Baard	Littenseradiel	53°09′N 5°40′E
Baardburen	Leeuwarden	53°08′N 5°47′E
Baarderburen (Baarderbuorren)	Súdwest-Fryslân	53°08′N 5°29′E
Baburen	Súdwest-Fryslân	53°03′N 5°30′E
Baaium	Waadhoeke	53°10′N 5°38′E
Bakhuizen	De Fryske Marren	52°52′N 5°27′E
Bakkeveen	Opsterland	53°05′N 6°15′E
Balk	De Fryske Marren	52°54′N 5°35′E
Ballingbuur	De Fryske Marren	53°00′N 5°46′E
Ballum	Ameland	53°27′N 5°41′E
Bandsloot	De Fryske Marren	52°51′N 5°49′E
Bantega	De Fryske Marren	52°50′N 5°48′E
Bargebek	De Fryske Marren	52°53′N 5°36′E
Bartlehiem	Tietjerksteradeel	53°17′N 5°50′E
Beers	Leeuwarden	53°09′N 5°44′E
Beetgum	Waadhoeke	53°14′N 5°41′E
Beetgumermolen	Waadhoeke	53°14′N 5°42′E
Beetsterzwaag	Opsterland	53°03′N 6°05′E
Benedenknijpe	Heerenveen	52°58′N 5°58′E
Bergum	Tytsjerksteradiel	53°12′N 6°00′E
Berlikum	Waadhoeke	53°15′N 5°39′E
Bernsterburen	Leeuwarden	53°06′N 5°44′E
Betterwird	Dongeradeel	53°20′N 5°58′E
Birdaard	Dantumadiel	53°18′N 5°53′E
Birstum	Heerenveen	53°04′N 5°51′E
Bisschop	Ooststellingwerf	53°03′N 6°15′E
Bittens	Leeuwarden	53°05′N 5°29′E
Blauwhuis	Súdwest-Fryslân	53°01′N 5°32′E
Blauwverlaat	Achtkarspelen	53°14′N 6°10′E
Blesdijke	Weststellingwerf	52°50′N 6°01′E
Blessum	Waadhoeke	53°11′N 5°42′E
Blije	Ferwerderadeel	53°21′N 5°52′E
Boekhorst	Ooststellingwerf	52°59′N 6°18′E
Boelenslaan	Achtkarspelen	53°10′N 6°09′E
Boer	Waadhoeke	53°13′N 5°34′E
Boijl (Boyl)	Weststellingwerf	52°54′N 6°11′E
Boksum	Waadhoeke	53°10′N 5°43′E
Bollingawier	Dongeradeel	53°23′N 6°02′E
Bolsward	Súdwest-Fryslân	53°04′N 5°32′E
Bonkwerd	Littenseradeel	53°08′N 5°36′E
Bontebok	Heerenveen	52°58′N 6°01′E
Boornbergum	Smallingerland	53°05′N 6°03′E
Boornzwaag, Lit	Littenseradeel	52°53′N 5°34′E
Boornzwaag	De Fryske Marren	52°58′N 5°45′E
Boornzwaag over de Wielen	De Fryske Marren	52°57′N 5°45′E
Bornwird	Dongeradeel	53°20′N 5°58′E
Bornwirdhuizen	Bornwirdhuizen	53°20′N 5°59′E
Boteburen	Ferwerderadeel	53°21′N 5°51′E
Bovenburen	Súdwest-Fryslân	52°56′N 5°28′E
Bovenknijpe	Heerenveen	52°58′N 5°59′E
Boyl	Weststellingwerf	52°55′N 6°12′E
Bozum	Súdwest-Fryslân	53°05′N 5°42′E
Brandeburen	Nijefurd	52°57′N 5°30′E
Brantgum	Dongeradeel	53°21′N 5°56′E
Britsum	Leeuwarden	53°15′N 5°47′E
Britswerd	Súdwest-Fryslân	53°07′N 5°41′E
Broek	De Fryske Marren	52°59′N 5°46′E
Broek-Noord	De Fryske Marren	52°59′N 5°47′E
Broeksterwoude	Dantumadiel	53°16′N 6°00′E
Brongerga	Heerenveen	52°57′N 5°59′E
Buitenpost	Achtkarspelen	53°15′N 6°09′E
Buitenstverlaat	Smallingerland	53°06′N 6°03′E
Buren	Ameland	53°27′N 5°48′E
Burgwerd	Súdwest-Fryslân	53°05′N 5°33′E
Burum	Kollumerland en Nieuwkruisland	53°16′N 6°14′E
Buttinga	Ooststellingwerf	52°59′N 6°17′E
Buweklooster	Achtkarspelen	53°12′N 6°08′E

== C ==
Name	Municipality	Coordinates
Commissiepolle	De Fryske Marren	52°52′N 5°48′E
Cornjum	Leeuwarden	53°15′N 5°47′E
Cornwerd	Súdwest-Fryslân	53°05′N 5°24′E

== D ==
Name	Municipality	Coordinates
Damwâld	Dantumadiel	53°17′N 6°00′E
Dantumawoude	Dantumadiel	53°18′N 6°01′E
De Blesse	Weststellingwerf	52°50′N 6°03′E
De Blijnse	Harlingen	53°11′N 5°27′E
De Blokken	Súdwest-Fryslân	53°08′N 5°26′E
De Bult	Ooststellingwerf	52°57′N 6°18′E
Deddingabuurt	Ooststellingwerf	52°57′N 6°10′E
Dedgum	Súdwest-Fryslân	53°01′N 5°29′E
Deersum	Súdwest-Fryslân	53°05′N 5°43′E
De Falom	Dantumadiel	53°16′N 6°01′E
Deinum	Waadhoeke	53°12′N 5°43′E
De Gaasten	Smallingerland	53°07′N 5°59′E
De Galhoek	Smallingerland	53°05′N 6°03′E
De Grits	Littenseradeel	53°07′N 5°34′E
De Hel	Súdwest-Fryslân	52°57′N 5°30′E
De Hem	Littenseradeel	53°08′N 5°41′E
De Hem	Leeuwarden	53°10′N 5°49′E
De Hoeve	Weststellingwerf	52°53′N 6°05′E
Deinum	Waadhoeke	53°12′N 5°43′E
De Keegen	Kollumerland	53°17′N 6°14′E
De Knijpe (De Knipe)	Heerenveen	52°58′N 5°58′E
De Knolle	Ooststellingwerf	53°01′N 6°20′E
De Kolk (Sneek)	Súdwest-Fryslân	53°18′N 6°14′E
Delburen	De Fryske Marren	52°53′N 5°36′E
Delfstrahuizen	De Fryske Marren	52°53′N 5°50′E
De Meente	Weststellingwerf	52°54′N 6°08′E
De Rijlst	De Fryske Marren	52°56′N 5°45′E
De Tike	Smallingerland	53°09′N 6°03′E
De Veenhoop	Smallingerland	53°06′N 5°57′E
De Wilgen	Smallingerland	53°06′N 6°02′E
Dijken	De Fryske Marren	52°57′N 5°43′E
Dijkshoek	Waadhoeke	53°16′N 5°33′E
Dijkshorne	Dongeradeel	53°21′N 6°08′E
Dijksterburen	Súdwest-Fryslân	53°08′N 5°25′E
Doijum	Waadhoeke	53°10′N 5°32′E
Dokkum	Dongeradeel	53°20′N 6°00′E
Dokkumer Nieuwe Zijlen	Dongeradeel	53°19′N 6°09′E
Domwier	Leeuwarden	53°08′N 5°51′E
Dongjum	Waadhoeke	53°13′N 5°33′E
Doniaburen	Súdwest Fryslân	53°00′N 5°26′E
Doniaga	De Fryske Marren	52°54′N 5°45′E
Donkerbroek	Ooststellingwerf	53°01′N 6°14′E
Draaisterhuizen	Súdwest-Fryslân	53°00′N 5°36′E
Drachten	Smallingerland	53°06′N 6°06′E
Drachtstercompagnie	Smallingerland	53°08′N 6°08′E
Drieboerehuizen	Dongeradeel	53°23′N 5°56′E
Driesum	Dantumadeel	53°18′N 6°03′E
Drogeham	Achtkarspelen	53°12′N 6°07′E
Dronrijp	Waadhoeke	53°12′N 5°39′E

== E ==
Name	Municipality	Coordinates
Echten	De Fryske Marren	52°52′N 5°48′E
Echtenerbrug	De Fryske Marren	52°52′N 5°49′E
Edens	Súdwest-Fryslân	53°07′N 5°37′E
Ee	Dongeradeel	53°20′N 6°06′E
Eemswoude	Súdwest-Fryslân	53°03′N 5°31′E
Eernewoude	Tytsjerksteradiel	53°08′N 5°56′E
Eesterga	De Fryske Marren	52°52′N 5°44′E
Eestrum	Tytsjerksteradiel	53°13′N 6°04′E
Egbertsgaasten	Smallingerland	53°07′N 6°02′E
Egypte	Ooststellingwerf	52°58′N 6°10′E
Elahuizen	De Fryske Marren	52°56′N 5°32′E
Elfbergen	De Fryske Marren	52°52′N 5°33′E
Elsloo	Ooststellingwerf	52°56′N 6°14′E
Engelum	Waadhoeke	53°14′N 5°43′E
Engwerd	Súdwest-Fryslân	53°05′N 5°45′E
Engwier	Wonseradeel	53°04′N 5°25′E
Engwierum	Dongeradeel	53°19′N 6°08′E
Exmorra	Súdwest-Fryslân	53°03′N 5°28′E
Exmorrazijl	Súdwest-Fryslân	53°04′N 5°28′E
Ezumazijl	Dongeradeel	53°22′N 6°09′E

== F ==
Name	Municipality	Coordinates
Fatum	Waadhoeke	53°09′N 5°35′E
Ferwerd	Ferwerderadeel	53°20′N 5°50′E
Ferwoude	Súdwest-Fryslân	53°01′N 5°26′E
Finkeburen	De Fryske Marren	52°55′N 5°43′E
Finkum	Leeuwarden	53°17′N 5°45′E
Firdgum	Waadhoeke	53°15′N 5°34′E
Flansum	Súdwest-Fryslân	53°05′N 5°46′E
Fochteloo	Ooststellingwerf	52°59′N 6°20′E
De Folgeren	Drachten	53°08′N 6°05′E
Follega	De Fryske Marren	52°53′N 5°44′E
Folsgare	Súdwest-Fryslân	53°02′N 5°36′E
Fons	Littenseradeel	53°09′N 5°43′E
Formerum	Terschelling	53°23′N 5°19′E
Foudgum	Dongeradeel	53°21′N 5°57′E
Franeker	Waadhoeke	53°12′N 5°32′E
Friens	Leeuwarden	53°06′N 5°48′E
Frieschepalen	Opsterland	53°07′N 6°12′E

== G ==
Name	Municipality	Coordinates
Gaast	Wûnseradiel	53°01′N 5°25′E
Gaastmeer	Wymbritseradiel	52°58′N 5°33′E
Galamadammen	Súdwest-Fryslân	52°54′N 5°28′E
Garijp	Tytsjerksteradiel	53°10′N 5°58′E
Gauw	Súdwest-Fryslân	53°04′N 5°43′E
Genum	Ferwerderadeel	53°19′N 5°53′E
Gerkesklooster	Achtkarspelen	53°14′N 6°12′E
Gersloot	Heerenveen	53°00′N 5°58′E
Giekerk	Tytsjerksteradiel	53°14′N 5°53′E
Giekerkerhoek	Giekerkerhoek	53°14′N 5°53′E
Gietersebrug	De Fryske Marren	52°52′N 5°46′E
Goënga	Súdwest-Fryslân	53°03′N 5°42′E
Goëngahuizen	Smallingerland	53°05′N 5°53′E
Goingarijp	De Fryske Marren	53°01′N 5°46′E
Gooium	Súdwest-Fryslân	53°06′N 5°24′E
Gorredijk	Opsterland	53°00′N 6°04′E
Goutum	Leeuwarden	53°11′N 5°48′E
Gracht	Weststellingwerf	52°51′N 5°52′E
Grauwe Kat	Súdwest-Fryslân	53°07′N 5°29′E
Greonterp	Súdwest-Fryslân	53°01′N 5°31′E
Groot Medhuizen	Dongeradeel	53°21′N 6°05′E
Groot Wieren	Súdwest-Fryslân	53°04′N 5°45′E
Grootwijngaarden	Opsterland	52°59′N 5°59′E
Grote Wiske	Súdwest-Fryslân	52°57′N 5°26′E
Grouw	Leeuwarden	53°06′N 5°50′E

== H ==
Name	Municipality	Coordinates
Halfweg	Kollumerland	53°18′N 6°15′E
Hallum	Ferwerderadeel	53°19′N 5°47′E
Hallumerhoek	Ferwerderadeel	53°18′N 5°46′E
Hamshorn	Achtkarspelen	53°11′N 6°07′E
Haneburen	Achtkarspelen	53°01′N 6°06′E
Hantum	Dongeradeel	53°22′N 5°58′E
Hantumerhoek	Dongeradeel	53°22′N 5°59′E
Hantumeruitburen	Dongeradeel	53°22′N 6°00′E
Hantumhuizen	Dongeradeel	53°22′N 6°00′E
Hardegarijp	Tytsjerksteradiel	53°13′N 5°57′E
Harich	De Fryske Marren	52°54′N 5°34′E
Harkema-Opeinde	Achtkarspelen	53°11′N 6°08′E
Harkezijl	Súdwest-Fryslân	53°06′N 5°27′E
Harlingen	Harlingen	53°11′N 5°25′E
Hartwerd	Súdwest-Fryslân	53°04′N 5°34′E
Haskerdijken	Heerenveen	53°00′N 5°52′E
Haskerhorne	De Fryske Marren	52°57′N 5°50′E
Hatsum	Littenseradeel	53°10′N 5°38′E
Haule	Ooststellingwerf	53°02′N 6°18′E
Haulerwijk	Ooststellingwerf	53°04′N 6°20′E
Hayum	Súdwest-Fryslân	53°06′N 5°25′E
Hee	Terschelling	53°23′N 5°15′E
Heeg	Súdwest-Fryslân	52°58′N 5°36′E
Heerenveen	Heerenveen	52°57′N 5°56′E
Heide	De Fryske Marren	52°56′N 5°46′E
Heidehuizen	Opsterland	53°04′N 6°08′E
Hemelum	De Fryske Marren	52°53′N 5°27′E
Hemert	Súdwest Fryslân	53°06′N 5°31′E
Hemmemabuurt	Súdwest-Fryslân	53°15′N 5°39′E
Hempens	Leeuwarden	53°11′N 5°50′E
Hemrik	Opsterland	53°02′N 6°08′E
Hemrikerverlaat	Opsterland	53°02′N 6°08′E
Hennaard	Súdwest-Fryslân	53°07′N 5°38′E
Herbaijum	Waadhoeke	53°11′N 5°30′E
Het Jachtveld	Achtkarspelen	53°10′N 6°07′E
Het Vliet	Súdwest-Fryslân	53°06′N 5°29′E
Het Zwartveen	Smallingerland	53°09′N 6°05′E
Hiaure	Dongeradeel	53°21′N 5°58′E
Hichtum	Súdwest-Fryslân	53°05′N 5°32′E
Hidaard	Súdwest-Fryslân	53°05′N 5°36′E
Hieslum	Súdwest-Fryslân	53°01′N 5°29′E
Hijlaard	Leeuwarden	53°10′N 5°42′E
Hijum	Leeuwarden	53°18′N 5°46′E
Hindeloopen	Súdwest-Fryslân	52°57′N 5°24′E
Hitzum	Waadhoeke	53°10′N 5°31′E
Hoarne	Leeuwarden	53°16′N 5°47′E
Hoek Makkinga	Ooststellingwerf	52°59′N 6°14′E
Hogebeintum	Ferwerderadeel	53°20′N 5°51′E
Holle Poarte	Súdwest-Fryslân	53°03′N 5°23′E
Hollum	Ameland	53°25′N 5°38′E
Holwerd	Dongeradeel	53°22′N 5°54′E
Hommerts	Súdwest-Fryslân	52°59′N 5°39′E
Hoogduurswoude	Ooststellingwerf	52°59′N 6°16′E
Hoogzand	Tietjerksteradeel	53°11′N 6°04′E
Hooibergen	De Fryske Marren	52°51′N 5°35′E
Hoorn	Terschelling	53°24′N 5°21′E
Hoornster (Zwaagcompagnie)	Heerenveen	53°01′N 6°10′E
Hornsterburen	Leeuwarden	53°06′N 5°47′E
Hoornsterzwaag	Opsterland	53°00′N 6°10′E
Houtigehage	Smallingerland	53°09′N 6°08′E
Houw	Súdwest-Fryslân	53°05′N 5°23′E
Húns	Leeuwarden	53°09′N 5°40′E

== I ==
Name	Municipality	Coordinates
Idaard	Leeuwarden	53°07′N 5°48′E
Idsegahuizum	Súdwest-Fryslân	53°03′N 5°25′E
Idserdaburen	Súdwest Fryslân	53°00′N 5°29′E
Idskenhuizen	De Fryske Marren	52°56′N 5°43′E
Idzega	Súdwest-Fryslân	52°59′N 5°33′E
IJsbrechtum	Súdwest-Fryslân	52°02′N 5°38′E
IJlst	IJlst	53°01′N 5°37′E
IJpecolsga	Súdwest-Fryslân	52°56′N 5°36′E
IJsbrechtum	Súdwest-Fryslân	53°03′N 5°38′E
Indijk	Súdwest-Fryslân	52°57′N 5°36′E
Indijk	Littenseradeel	53°06′N 5°42′E
Iniaheide	Tietjerksteradeel	53°09′N 6°00′E
Irnsum	Leeuwarden	53°05′N 5°48′E
Itens	Súdwest-Fryslân	53°06′N 5°39′E
It Heidenskip	Súdwest-Fryslân	52°57′N 5°30′E

== J ==
Name	Municipality	Coordinates
Janssenstichting	Ooststellingwerf	53°03′N 6°01′E
Janssenstichting	Ooststellingwerf	53°03′N 6°16′E
Janum	Ferwerderadeel	53°19′N 5°54′E
Jardinga	Ooststellingwerf	53°01′N 6°17′E
Jellum	Leeuwarden	53°10′N 5°45′E
Jelsum	Leeuwarden	53°14′N 5°47′E
Jislum	Ferwerderadiel	53°19′N 5°53′E
Jonkershuizen	Súdwest-Fryslân	53°02′N 5°31′E
Jonkersland	Opsterland	52°59′N 6°03′E
Jorwerd	Leeuwarden	53°09′N 5°43′E
Joure	De Fryske Marren	52°58′N 5°47′E
Jousterp	Súdwest-Fryslân	53°02′N 5°29′E
Jouswerd	Súdwest-Fryslân	53°02′N 5°33′E
Jouswier	Dongeradeel	53°21′N 6°03′E
Jubbega Derde Sluis	Opsterland	53°00′N 6°07′E
Jubbega-Schurega	Heerenveen	52°58′N 6°07′E
Jubbegastercompagnie	Heerenveen	52°59′N 6°06′E
Jutrijp	Súdwest-Fryslân	53°00′N 5°39′E

== K ==
Name	Municipality	Coordinates
Kaart	Terschelling	53°23′N 5°16′E
Kampen	Súdwest-Fryslân	53°06′N 5°27′E
Katlijk	Heerenveen	52°57′N 6°03′E
Kerkeburen	Súdwest-Fryslân	53°05′N 5°47′E
Kettingwier	Kollumerland	53°18′N 6°04′E
Kie	Waadhoeke	53°11′N 5°31′E
Kiesterzijl	Waadhoeke	53°11′N 5°30′E
Kimswerd	Wûnseradiel	53°08′N 5°26′E
Kingmatille	Waadhoeke	53°11′N 5°36′E
Kinnum	Terschelling	53°23′N 5°17′E
Kleine Gaastmeer	Súdwest-Fryslân	52°58′N 5°32′E
Kleinegeest	Tietjerksteradeel	53°12′N 5°54′E
Kleine Wiske	Súdwest-Fryslân	52°57′N 5°27′E
Klein Groningen	Opsterland	53°03′N 6°13′E
Klein Medhuizen	Dongeradeel	53°20′N 6°05′E
Klein Wieren	Súdwest-Fryslân	53°04′N 5°45′E
Klidse	Opsterland	53°01′N 6°01′E
Kloosterburen	Tietjerksteradeel	53°09′N 5°59′E
Klooster-Lidlum	Waadhoeke	53°14′N 5°31′E
Koehool	Waadhoeke	53°15′N 5°32′E
Kolderwolde	De Fryske Marren	52°54′N 5°31′E
Kollum	Kollumerland en Nieuwkruisland	53°17′N 6°09′E
Kollumerpomp	Kollumerland en Nieuwkruisland	53°18′N 6°12′E
Kollumerzwaag	Kollumerland en Nieuwkruisland	53°16′N 6°04′E
Koningsbuurt	Harlingen	53°10′N 5°26′E
Kooihuizen	Súdwest-Fryslân	53°02′N 5°25′E
Kooisloot	Weststellingwerf	52°50′N 5°48′E
Kooten	Achtkarspelen	53°13′N 6°05′E
Kootstertille	Achtkarspelen	53°13′N 6°06′E
Kornwerderzand	Súdwest-Fryslân	53°04′N 5°20′E
Kortehemmen	Smallingerland	53°04′N 6°05′E
Kortezwaag	Opsterland	52°59′N 6°04′E
Kortwoude	Achtkarspelen	53°11′N 6°10′E
Koudehuizum	Súdwest-Fryslân	53°06′N 5°27′E
Koudum	De Fryske Marren	52°55′N 5°27′E
Koufurderrige	Súdwest-Fryslân	52°57′N 5°39′E
Koundenburg	Ooststellingwerf	53°02′N 6°20′E
Krabbeburen	Kollumerland	53°18′N 6°16′E
Kromwal	Littenseradeel	53°07′N 5°40′E
Kubaard	Súdwest-Fryslân	53°07′N 5°34′E
Kuikhorne	Achtkarspelen	53°15′N 6°01′E

== L ==
Name	Municipality	Coordinates
Laad en Zaad	Súdwest-Fryslân	53°03′N 5°33′E
Laagduurswoude	Ooststellingwerf	52°59′N 6°15′E
Laaxum	De Fryske Marren	52°51′N 5°25′E
Landerum	Terschelling	53°23′N 5°18′E
Langedijke	Ooststellingwerf	52°57′N 6°17′E
Langelille	Weststellingwerf	52°51′N 5°51′E
Langezwaag	Opsterland	52°59′N 6°00′E
Langweer	De Fryske Marren	52°58′N 5°43′E
Lankum	Waadhoeke	53°11′N 5°31′E
Leegte	Kollumerland	53°17′N 6°15′E
Leeuwarden	Leeuwarden	53°12′N 5°47′E
Legemeer	De Fryske Marren	52°56′N 5°44′E
Lekkerterp	Heerenveen	53°02′N 5°54′E
Lekkum	Leeuwarden	53°14′N 5°49′E
Lemmer	De Fryske Marren	52°51′N 5°43′E
Leons	Leeuwarden	53°09′N 5°41′E
Lichtaard	Ferwerderadeel	53°20′N 5°55′E
Lies	Terschelling	53°24′N 5°20′E
Lioessens	Dongeradeel	53°23′N 6°05′E
Lippenhuizen	Opsterland	53°01′N 6°06′E
Lippenwoude	Súdwest-Fryslân	52°58′N 5°39′E
Loënga	Súdwest-Fryslân	53°03′N 5°41′E
Lollum	Súdwest-Fryslân	53°08′N 5°32′E
Lombok	Ooststellingwerf	52°53′N 6°09′E
Longerhouw	Súdwest-Fryslân	53°04′N 5°29′E
Luchtenveld	Smallingerland	53°09′N 6°09′E
Luinjeberd	Heerenveen	52°59′N 5°55′E
Lutjelollum	Waadhoeke	53°10′N 5°34′E
Franekeradeel	Franekeradeel	53°15′N 6°09′E
Lytsewierrum	Súdwest-Fryslân	53°06′N 5°40′E
Luxterhoek	Opsterland	53°00′N 5°59′E
Luxwoude	Opsterland	53°00′N 5°59′E
Lytshuzen	Súdwest-Fryslân	52°59′N 5°36′E

== M ==
Name	Municipality	Coordinates
Maemert	Littenseradeel	53°09′N 5°39′E
Makkinga	Ooststellingwerf	52°59′N 6°13′E
Makkum	Súdwest-Fryslân	53°03′N 5°24′E
Makkum	Littenseradiel	53°06′N 5°41′E
Mantgum	Leeuwarden	53°08′N 5°43′E
Marrum	Ferwerderadeel	53°20′N 5°48′E
Marssum	Waadhoeke	53°13′N 5°44′E
Medhuizen	Ooststellingwerf	52°59′N 6°19′E
Meilahuizen	Littenseradeel	53°06′N 5°39′E
Menaldum	Waadhoeke	53°13′N 5°40′E
Metslawier	Dongeradeel	53°22′N 6°04′E
Middelburen	Ooststellingwerf	52°58′N 6°12′E
Middelburen	Smallingerland	53°08′N 6°02′E
Middenvaart	De Fryske Marren	52°51′N 5°47′E
Midlum	Harlingen	53°11′N 5°27′E
Midsburen	Leeuwarden	53°09′N 5°53′E
Midsland	Terschelling	53°23′N 5°17′E
Midsland aan Zee	Terschelling	53°24′N 5°17′E
Midsland Noord	Terschelling	53°24′N 5°17′E
Miedum	Franekeradeel	53°10′N 5°33′E
Miedum	Leeuwarden	53°14′N 5°50′E
Mildam	Heerenveen	52°56′N 6°00′E
Minnertsga	Waadhoeke	53°15′N 5°36′E
Mirns	De Fryske Marren	52°51′N 5°28′E
Moddergat	Dongeradeel	53°24′N 6°05′E
Molenend	Tytsjerksteradiel	53°15′N 5°56′E
Molkwerum	De Fryske Marren	52°54′N 5°24′E
Morra	Dongeradeel	53°22′N 6°06′E
Moskou	Ooststellingwerf	53°02′N 6°12′E
Munnekebaayum	Littenseradeel	53°09′N 5°37′E
Munnekeburen	Weststellingwerf	52°51′N 5°53′E
Munnekezijl	Kollumerland en Nieuwkruisland	53°18′N 6°16′E

== N ==
Name	Municipality	Coordinates
Naarderburen	Leeuwarden	53°09′N 5°51′E
Nes	Heerenveen	53°03′N 5°51′E
Nes	Dongeradeel	53°24′N 6°03′E
Nes	Ameland	53°27′N 5°46′E
Niawier	Dongeradeel	53°22′N 6°03′E
Nieuw Amerika	De Fryske Marren	52°52′N 5°34′E
Nieuw Buren	Súdwest-Fryslân	52°53′N 5°28′E
Nieuwe Bildtdijk	Het Bildt	53°19′N 5°40′E
Nieuwe Bildtzijl	Ferwerderadeel	53°19′N 5°43′E
Nieuwebrug	Heerenveen	52°59′N 5°53′E
Nieuwehorne	Heerenveen	52°57′N 6°03′E
Nieuweschoot	Heerenveen	52°56′N 5°56′E
Nieuwe Vaart	Opsterland	52°59′N 6°01′E
Nieuwland	Dongeradeel	53°20′N 6°09′E
Nieuwstad	Kollumerland en Nieuwkruisland	53°16′N 6°03′E
Nieuw Weper	Ooststellingwerf	53°01′N 6°21′E
Nij Altoenae	Waadhoeke	53°18′N 5°39′E
Nij Beets	Opsterland	53°04′N 6°00′E
Nijeberkoop	Ooststellingwerf	52°57′N 6°11′E
Nijega	Smallingerland	53°08′N 6°01′E
Nijehaske	De Fryske Marren	52°58′N 5°54′E
Nijeholtpade	Weststellingwerf	52°55′N 6°05′E
Nijeholtwolde	Weststellingwerf	52°53′N 5°59′E
Nijelamer	Weststellingwerf	52°53′N 5°58′E
Nijemirdum	De Fryske Marren	52°51′N 5°34′E
Nijetrijne	Weststellingwerf	52°51′N 5°55′E
Nijezijl	Súdwest-Fryslân	53°00′N 5°37′E
Nijhuizum	Súdwest-Fryslân	52°59′N 5°29′E
Nijkleaster	Súdwest-Fryslân	53°04′N 5°42′E
Nijland	Súdwest-Fryslân	53°03′N 5°35′E
Noordbergum	Tytsjerksteradiel	53°13′N 6°01′E
Noordwolde	Weststellingwerf	52°54′N 6°09′E

== O ==
Name	Municipality	Coordinates
Oenkerk	Tytsjerksteradiel	53°15′N 5°54′E
Offingawier	Súdwest-Fryslân	53°02′N 5°42′E
Oldeberkoop	Ooststellingwerf	52°57′N 6°08′E
Oldeboorn	Heerenveen	53°03′N 5°54′E
Oldeholtpade	Weststellingwerf	52°54′N 6°03′E
Oldeholtwolde	Weststellingwerf	52°54′N 6°01′E
Oldelamer	Weststellingwerf	52°52′N 5°56′E
Oldeouwer	De Fryske Marren	52°55′N 5°48′E
Oldetrijne	Weststellingwerf	52°52′N 5°57′E
Olterterp	Opsterland	53°04′N 6°06′E
Onland	Scharsterland	52°56′N 5°51′E
Oosterbierum	Waadhoeke	53°14′N 5°31′E
Oosterboorn	Heerenveen	53°03′N 5°56′E
Oosterend	Littenseradiel	53°05′N 5°37′E
Oosterend	Terschelling	53°24′N 5°23′E
Oosterlittens	Littenseradiel	53°08′N 5°39′E
Oostermeer	Tietjerksteradeel	53°10′N 6°03′E
Oosternijkerk	Dongeradeel	53°23′N 6°03′E
Oosterstreek	Weststellingwerf	52°55′N 6°10′E
Oosterwierum	Littenseradiel	53°07′N 5°44′E
Oosterwolde	Ooststellingwerf	53°00′N 6°18′E
Oosterzee	De Fryske Marren	52°52′N 5°46′E
Oosthem	Súdwest-Fryslân	53°01′N 5°36′E
Oostmahorn	Dongeradeel	53°23′N 6°10′E
Oostrum	Dongeradeel	53°20′N 6°04′E
Oost-Vlieland	Vlieland	53°17′N 5°04′E
Opeinde	Smallingerland	53°08′N 6°04′E
Ophuis	Achtkarspelen	53°12′N 6°10′E
Oppenhuizen	Súdwest-Fryslân	53°01′N 5°42′E
Opperburen	Opsterland	53°04′N 6°13′E
Opperburen	Smallingerland	53°08′N 6°00′E
Oranjewoud	Heerenveen	52°57′N 5°58′E
Osingahuizen	Súdwest-Fryslân	52°59′N 5°37′E
Otterweg	De Fryske Marren	52°51′N 5°47′E
Oud-Appelscha	Ooststellingwerf	52°57′N 6°20′E
Oud-Beets	Opsterland	53°04′N 6°02′E
Oude Bildtdijk	Het Bildt	53°18′N 5°41′E
Oude Bildtzijl	Waadhoeke	53°18′N 5°43′E
Oudega	De Fryske Marren	52°54′N 5°31′E
Oudega	Súdwest-Fryslân	53°00′N 5°33′E
Oudega	Smallingerland	53°08′N 6°00′E
Oudehaske	De Fryske Marren	52°57′N 5°52′E
Oudehorne	Heerenveen	52°58′N 6°04′E
Oudehornstercompagnie	Heerenveen	52°59′N 6°06′E
Oude Leije	Leeuwarderadeel	53°18′N 5°44′E
Oudemirdum	De Fryske Marren	52°51′N 5°32′E
Oudeschoot	Heerenveen	52°56′N 5°58′E
Oude Schouw	Heerenveen	53°04′N 5°49′E
Oude Terp	Dongeradeel	53°20′N 6°07′E
Oudewegstervaart	Opsterland	53°01′N 5°58′E
Oudkerk	Tytsjerksteradiel	53°16′N 5°53′E
Oudwoude	Kollumerland en Nieuwkruisland	53°17′N 6°07′E
Ouwsterhaule	De Fryske Marren	52°56′N 5°49′E
Ouwster-Nijega	De Fryske Marren	52°56′N 5°48′E
Overburen	Weststellingwerf	52°51′N 6°04′E

== P ==
Name	Municipality	Coordinates
Paesens	Dongeradeel	53°24′N 6°05′E
Parrega	Súdwest-Fryslân	53°01′N 5°29′E
Peins	Waadhoeke	53°12′N 5°36′E
Peperga	Weststellingwerf	52°50′N 6°05′E
Petersburg	Ooststellingwerf	53°02′N 6°13′E
Piaam	Súdwest-Fryslân	53°02′N 5°24′E
Piekezijl	Súdwest-Fryslân	53°01′N 5°35′E
Pietersbierum	Waadhoeke	53°13′N 5°29′E
Pietersburen	Barradeel	53°07′N 6°10′E
Pingjum	Súdwest-Fryslân	53°07′N 5°26′E
Polle	De Friese Meren	52°55′N 5°51′E
Poppenhuizen	Smallingerland	53°04′N 5°55′E
Poppingawier	Súdwest-Fryslân	53°05′N 5°45′E

== Q ==
Name	Municipality	Coordinates
Quatrebras	Tytsjerksteradiel	53°13′N 5°59′E

== R ==
Name	Municipality	Coordinates
Raard	Dongeradeel	53°20′N 5°57′E
Rauwerd	Súdwest-Fryslân	53°06′N 5°45′E
Ravenswoud	Ooststellingwerf	52°58′N 6°23′E
Reidswal	Dongeradeel	53°21′N 6°05′E
Reitsum	Ferwerderadiel	53°19′N 5°54′E
Remswerd	Súdwest-Fryslân	53°03′N 5°33′E
Ried	Waadhoeke	53°13′N 5°36′E
Rien	Littenseradeel	53°06′N 5°39′E
Rijperkerk	Tietjerksteradeel	53°13′N 5°55′E
Rijs	De Fryske Marren	52°52′N 5°30′E
Rijsberkampen	Weststellingwerf	52°56′N 6°13′E
Rijtseterp	Súdwest-Fryslân	53°02′N 5°29′E
Rinsumageest	Dantumadiel	53°18′N 5°57′E
Ritsumazijl	Menaldumadeel	53°12′N 5°44′E
Rode Dorp	Weststellingwerf	52°54′N 6°09′E
Rohel	De Fryske Marren	52°55′N 5°50′E
Rohel	Achtkarspelen	53°13′N 6°09′E
Roodeschuur	Súdwest-Fryslân	53°12′N 6°09′E
Roodhuis	Littenseradiel	53°05′N 5°38′E
Roodkerk	Dantumadiel	53°16′N 5°55′E
Roordahuizum	Leeuwarden	53°07′N 5°48′E
Ropta	Dongeradeel	53°22′N 6°04′E
Roptazijl	Franekeradeel	53°13′N 5°27′E
Rotstergaast	De Fryske Marren	52°54′N 5°54′E
Rotsterhaule	De Fryske Marren	52°56′N 5°51′E
Rottevalle	Smallingerland	53°09′N 6°06′E
Rottum	De Fryske Marren	52°56′N 5°54′E
Ruigahuizen	De Fryske Marren	52°53′N 5°34′E

== S ==
Name	Municipality	Coordinates
Salverd	Waadhoeke	53°11′N 5°35′E
Sandfirden	Súdwest-Fryslân	52°59′N 5°31′E
Schalsum	Waadhoeke	53°12′N 5°34′E
Scharl	Súdwest-Fryslân	52°52′N 5°24′E
Scharneburen	Súdwest Fryslân	53°00′N 5°26′E
Scharnegoutum	Súdwest-Fryslân	53°04′N 5°41′E
Scharsterbrug	De Fryske Marren	52°57′N 5°47′E
Scherpenzeel	Weststellingwerf	52°50′N 5°53′E
Schettens	Súdwest-Fryslân	53°05′N 5°29′E
Schiermonnikoog	Schiermonnikoog	53°29′N 6°10′E
Schillaard	Littenseradeel	53°07′N 5°42′E
Schingen	Waadhoeke	53°12′N 5°37′E
Schoterzijl	Weststellingwerf	52°49′N 5°49′E
Schouw	De Fryske Marren	52°52′N 5°32′E
Schraard	Súdwest-Fryslân	53°05′N 5°27′E
Schrins	Littenseradeel	53°07′N 5°39′E
Schuilenburg	Tytsjerksteradiel	53°12′N 6°04′E
Seeryp	Terschelling	53°23′N 5°18′E
Selmien	Opsterland	53°06′N 6°08′E
Sexbierum	Waadhoeke	53°13′N 5°29′E
Siegerswoude	Opsterland	53°06′N 6°12′E
Siegerswoude	Opsterland	53°09′N 5°58′E
Sijbrandaburen	Littenseradiel	53°04′N 5°43′E
Sijbrandahuis	Dantumadiel	53°19′N 5°58′E
Sijthuizen	Heerenveen	53°02′N 5°51′E
Sint Annaparochie	Waadhoeke	53°17′N 5°40′E
Sint Jacobiparochie	Waadhoeke	53°16′N 5°36′E
Sintjohannesga	De Fryske Marren	52°55′N 5°51′E
Sint Nicolaasga	De Fryske Marren	52°55′N 5°45′E
Sjungadijk	Súdwest-Fryslân	53°06′N 5°32′E
Slappeterp	Waadhoeke	53°13′N 5°37′E
Slijkenburg	Weststellingwerf	52°49′N 5°51′E
Sloten	De Fryske Marren	52°54′N 5°39′E
Smallebrugge	Súdwest-Fryslân	52°57′N 5°38′E
Smalle Ee	Smallingerland	53°06′N 6°02′E
Snakkerburen	Leeuwarden	53°13′N 5°48′E
Sneek	Súdwest-Fryslân	53°02′N 5°40′E
Snikzwaag	De Fryske Marren	52°59′N 5°47′E
Sondel	De Fryske Marren	52°52′N 5°36′E
Sonnega	Weststellingwerf	52°52′N 5°58′E
Sopsum	Waadhoeke	53°10′N 5°30′E
Sorremorre	Heerenveen	53°04′N 5°52′E
Sotterum	Súdwest-Fryslân	53°04′N 5°29′E
Spanga	Weststellingwerf	52°49′N 5°54′E
Spannenburg	De Fryske Marren	52°55′N 5°42′E
Spannum	Waadhoeke	53°09′N 5°37′E
Sparjebird	Opsterland	53°02′N 6°10′E
Speers, Friesland	Súdwest-Fryslân	53°04′N 5°42′E
Spijk	Littenseradiel	53°07′N 5°38′E
Spitsendijk	Heerenveen	53°00′N 5°55′E
Sprong	Littenseradeel	53°08′N 5°39′E
Staveren	Súdwest-Fryslân	52°53′N 5°22′E
Steenharst	Kollumerland	53°16′N 6°10′E
Steenvak	Dongeradeel	53°19′N 6°06′E
Steggerda	Weststellingwerf	52°51′N 6°04′E
Stiem	Dongeradeel	53°22′N 6°09′E
Stiens	Leeuwarderadeel	53°16′N 5°46′E
Strand	Súdwest-Fryslân	53°07′N 5°24′E
Stroobos	Achtkarspelen	53°14′N 6°13′E
Suameer	Tytsjerksteradiel	53°11′N 6°00′E
Suawoude	Tytsjerksteradiel	53°11′N 5°56′E
Surhuisterveen	Achtkarspelen	53°11′N 6°10′E
Surhuizum	Achtkarspelen	53°12′N 6°11′E
Surhuizumer Mieden	Achtkarspelen	53°13′N 6°13′E
Swichum	Leeuwarden	53°09′N 5°49′E

== T ==
Name	Municipality	Coordinates
Tacozijl	De Fryske Marren	52°52′N 5°39′E
Teerd	Dongeradeel	53°22′N 6°08′E
Teerns	Leeuwarden	53°11′N 5°50′E
Teijeburen	Dongeradeel	53°23′N 5°56′E
Terband	Heerenveen	52°59′N 5°55′E
Tergracht	Ferwerderadeel	53°17′N 5°51′E
Terhorne	De Fryske Marren	53°02′N 5°47′E
Ter Idzard	Weststellingwerf	52°54′N 6°02′E
Terkaple	De Fryske Marren	53°01′N 5°47′E
Ternaard	Dongeradeel	53°23′N 5°58′E
Teroele	De Fryske Marren	52°56′N 5°42′E
Terwispel	Opsterland	53°01′N 6°03′E
Terwisscha	Ooststellingwerf	52°57′N 6°18′E
Terzool	Súdwest-Fryslân	53°04′N 5°44′E
't Heechhout	Littenseradeel	53°10′N 5°36′E
Tibma	Dongeradeel	53°20′N 6°07′E
Tichelwerk	Tietjerksteradeel	53°16′N 5°50′E
Tietjerk	Tytsjerksteradiel	53°12′N 5°55′E
Tijnje	Opsterland	53°02′N 6°00′E
Tilburen	Dongeradeel	53°20′N 6°03′E
Tirns	Súdwest-Fryslân	53°04′N 5°38′E
Tjaard	Leeuwarden	53°08′N 5°49′E
Tjalhuizum	Súdwest-Fryslân	53°03′N 5°37′E
Tjalleberd	Heerenveen	53°00′N 5°57′E
Tjeintgum	Littenseradeel	53°08′N 5°43′E
Tjeppenboer	Littenseradeel	53°11′N 5°36′E
Tjerkgaast	De Fryske Marren	52°54′N 5°41′E
Tjerkwerd	Súdwest-Fryslân	53°03′N 5°30′E
Triemen	Kollumerland en Nieuwkruisland	53°17′N 6°06′E
Tritzum	Franekeradeel	53°08′N 5°34′E
Tronde	Ooststellingwerf	52°58′N 6°13′E
Trophorne	Súdwest-Fryslân	52°56′N 5°34′E
't Schoor	Dongeradeel	53°24′N 5°59′E
Twijtel	Ooststellingwerf	52°58′N 6°12′E
Twijzel	Achtkarspelen	53°14′N 6°06′E
Twijzelerheide	Achtkarspelen	53°15′N 6°03′E
Tzum	Waadhoeke	53°09′N 5°34′E
Tzummarum	Waadhoeke	53°14′N 5°33′E

== U ==
Name	Municipality	Coordinates
Uilesprong	Opsterland	53°03′N 5°58′E
Uiteinde	Smallingerland	53°08′N 5°59′E
Uitwellingerga	Súdwest-Fryslân	53°00′N 5°42′E
Ungebuurt	Harlingen	53°11′N 5°28′E
Ureterp	Opsterland	53°06′N 6°10′E
Ureterp aan de Vaart	Opsterland	53°07′N 6°10′E
Ureterperverlaat	Smallingerland	53°06′N 6°08′E

== V ==
Name	Municipality	Coordinates
Vaardeburen	Ferwerderadeel	53°21′N 5°53′E
Veenklooster	Kollumerland en Nieuwkruisland	53°16′N 6°06′E
Veenwouden	Dantumadiel	53°14′N 6°00′E
Veenwoudsterwal	Dantumadiel	53°14′N 5°59′E
Vegelinsoord	De Fryske Marren	53°00′N 5°52′E
Veneburen	Ooststellingwerf	52°58′N 6°15′E
Venekoten	Ooststellingwerf	52°59′N 6°18′E
Vensterburen	Leeuwarderadeel	53°14′N 5°47′E
Vierhuis	De Fryske Marren	52°54′N 5°51′E
Vierhuizen	Súdwest-Fryslân	53°03′N 5°27′E
Vijfhuis	Súdwest-Fryslân	53°02′N 5°33′E
Vijfhuizen	Ferwerderadeel	53°19′N 5°45′E
Vinkega	Weststellingwerf	52°52′N 6°07′E
Visbuurt	Dongeradeel	53°23′N 5°57′E
Vissersburen	Súdwest-Fryslân	52°57′N 5°33′E
Voorrijp	Harlingen	53°12′N 5°29′E
Voorwerk	Opsterland	53°06′N 6°15′E
Vosseburen	Opsterland	53°01′N 6°07′E
Vrouwenparochie	Waadhoeke	53°17′N 5°42′E

== W ==
Name	Municipality	Coordinates
Waaxens	Littenseradeel	53°07′N 5°33′E
Waaxens	Dongeradeel	53°21′N 5°55′E
Wammert	Littenseradeel	53°08′N 5°40′E
Wanswerd	Ferwerderadiel	53°18′N 5°51′E
Wanswerd aan de Streek (Ferwerd)	Ferwerderadeel	53°17′N 5°52′E
War (Franeker)	Franekeradeel	53°12′N 5°31′E
Warfstermolen	Kollumerland en Nieuwkruisland	53°18′N 6°14′E
Warga	Leeuwarden	53°09′N 5°50′E
Warniahuizen	Heerenveen	53°04′N 5°56′E
Warns	De Fryske Marren	52°52′N 5°25′E
Warstiens	Leeuwarden	53°10′N 5°52′E
Wartena	Leeuwarden	53°09′N 5°54′E
Waskemeer	Ooststellingwerf	53°03′N 6°17′E
Wedzeburen	Achtkarspelen	53°14′N 6°06′E
Weidum	Littenseradiel	53°09′N 5°45′E
Wjelsryp	Waadhoeke	53°10′N 5°36′E
Weper	Ooststellingwerf	53°01′N 6°19′E
West aan Zee	Terschelling	53°24′N 5°16′E
Westerend Harich	Súdwest-Fryslân	52°53′N 5°31′E
Westergeest	Kollumerland en Nieuwkruisland	53°18′N 6°05′E
Westermeer	De Fryske Marren	52°58′N 5°48′E
Westernijkerk	Ferwerderadeel	53°20′N 5°48′E
Westhem	Súdwest-Fryslân	53°01′N 5°33′E
Westhoek	Waadhoeke	53°17′N 5°34′E
West-Terschelling	Terschelling	53°22′N 5°13′E
Wetzens	Dongeradeel	53°21′N 6°02′E
Wie	Dongeradeel	53°23′N 6°02′E
Wier	Waadhoeke	53°15′N 5°38′E
Wierum	Dongeradeel	53°24′N 6°01′E
Wieuwerd	Littenseradeel	53°07′N 5°41′E
Wijckel	De Fryske Marren	52°53′N 5°38′E
Wijckelereebuurt	De Fryske Marren	52°53′N 5°37′E
Wijgeest	Kollumerland	53°17′N 6°08′E
Wijnaldum	Franekeradeel	53°12′N 5°28′E
Wijnjeterpverlaat	Opsterland	53°02′N 6°10′E
Wijnjewoude	Opsterland	53°03′N 6°11′E
Wijns	Tietjerksteradeel	53°15′N 5°50′E
Wijtgaard	Leeuwarden	53°09′N 5°48′E
Wilaard	Leeuwarden	53°12′N 5°50′E
Willemstad	Ooststellingwerf	52°58′N 6°21′E
Winsum	Waadhoeke	53°09′N 5°38′E
Wirdum	Leeuwarden	53°09′N 5°49′E
Witmarsum	Súdwest-Fryslân	53°06′N 5°28′E
Witveen	Tytsjerksteradiel	53°10′N 6°06′E
Wolsum	Súdwest-Fryslân	53°02′N 5°33′E
Wolvega	Weststellingwerf	52°53′N 6°00′E
Wommels	Littenseradiel	53°07′N 5°35′E
Wonneburen	Súdwest-Fryslân	53°01′N 5°26′E
Wons	Súdwest-Fryslân	53°05′N 5°25′E
Workum	Súdwest-Fryslân	52°59′N 5°27′E
Woudsend	Súdwest-Fryslân	52°57′N 5°38′E
Wouterswoude	Dantumadiel	53°18′N 6°02′E

== Y ==
Name	Municipality	Coordinates
Ypecolsga (Ypekolsgea)	Súdwest-Fryslân	52°56′N 5°36′E

== Z ==
Name	Municipality	Coordinates
Zandbulten	Kollumerland	53°16′N 6°5′E
Zandhuizen	Weststellingwerf	52°56′N 5°36′E
Zevenbuurt	De Friese Meren	52°52′N 5°51′E
Zevenhuizen	Kollumerland en Nieuwkruisland	53°14′N 6°00′E
Zuiderburen	Leeuwarden	53°10′N 5°50′E
Zuiderend	Leeuwarden	53°05′N 5°49′E
Zurich	Súdwest-Fryslân	53°07′N 5°24′E
Zwaagwesteinde	Dantumadiel	53°16′N 6°03′E
Zwagerbosch	Kollumerland en Nieuwkruisland	53°14′N 6°03′E
Zwagerveen	Kollumerland en Nieuwkruisland	53°16′N 6°05′E
Zwarte Haan	Waadhoeke	53°19′N 5°38′E
Zweins	Waadhoeke	53°12′N 5°36′E

== Sources ==
- GEOnet Names Server (GNS)
