= Baaiduinen =

Baaiduinen Baaidunen
- Village
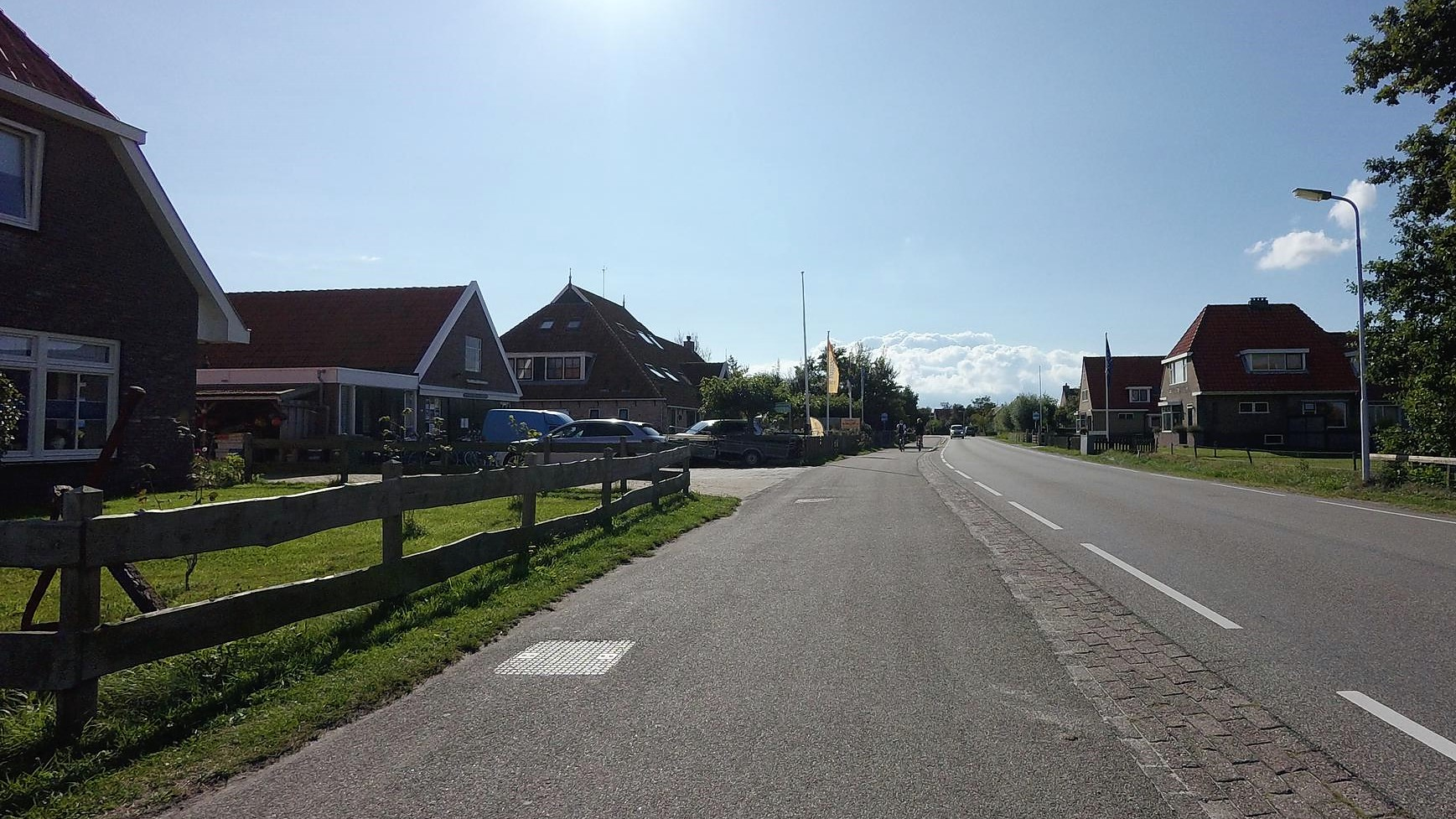

- Location in the Netherlands
- Coordinates: 53°22′40″N 5°16′34″E
- Country: Netherlands
- Province: Friesland
- Municipality: Terschelling

Population (1 January 2017)
  - Total: 106
- Time zone: UTC+1 (CET)
  - Summer (DST): UTC+2 (CEST)
- Postal code: 8884
- Dialing code: 0562

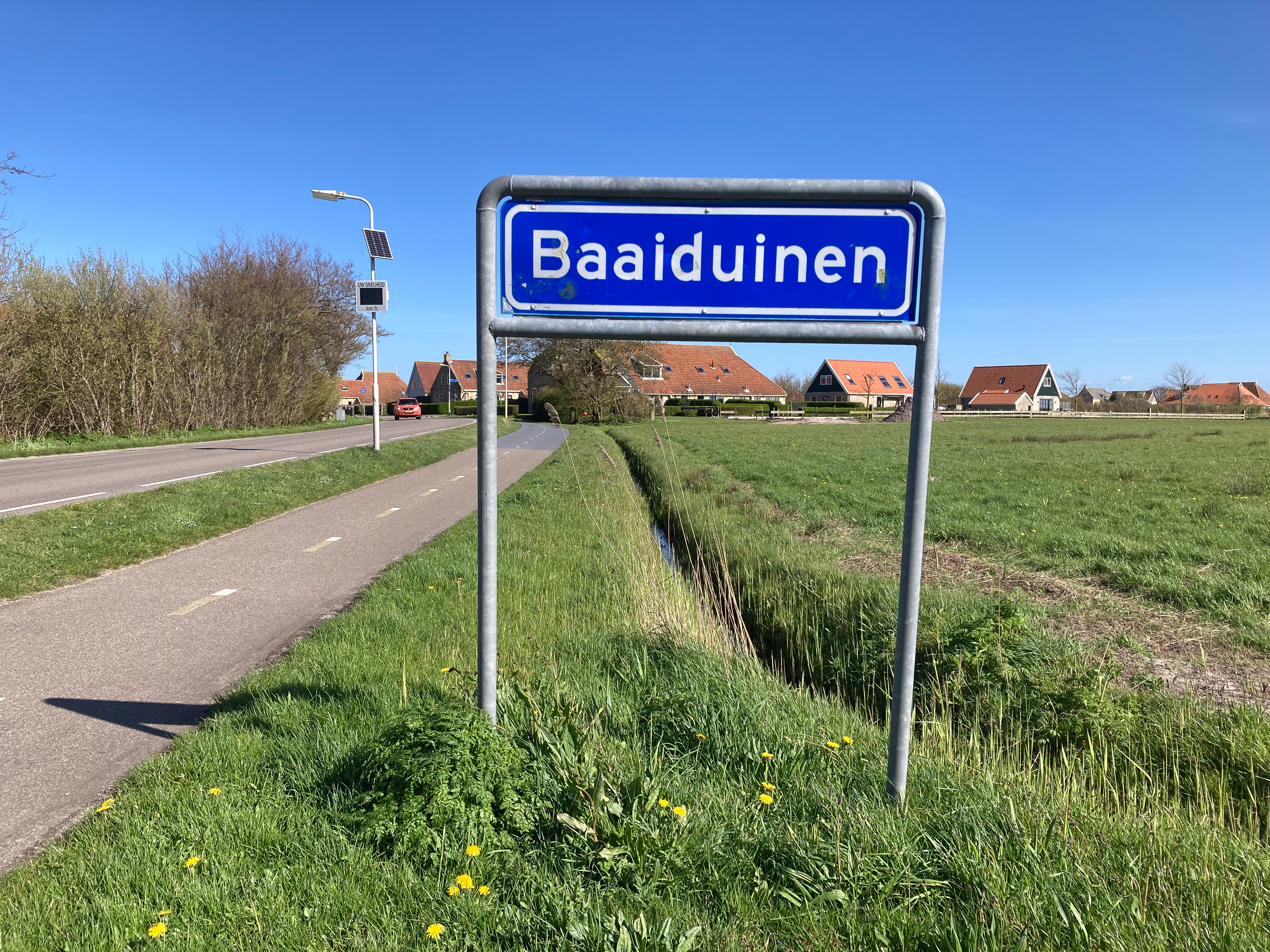
Placename sign of Baaiduinen

Baaiduinen is a village in the north of the Netherlands, on the Wadden Sea island of Terschelling, Friesland. It had a population of 106 in January 2017.

Baaiduinen is surrounded by the much older hamlets of Kinnum, Kaart (Kaard) en Horp. Baaiduinen is the youngest village on Terschelling and has only been recognized as a separate settlement in the 19th century. North of Baaiduinen is a polder landscape named het Hoge Land ("the highlands").

Tourism has replaced dairy farming as the main source of income and most farms have been rebuilt to accommodate tourists.
