= Oosterzee =

Oosterzee Eastersee
- Village
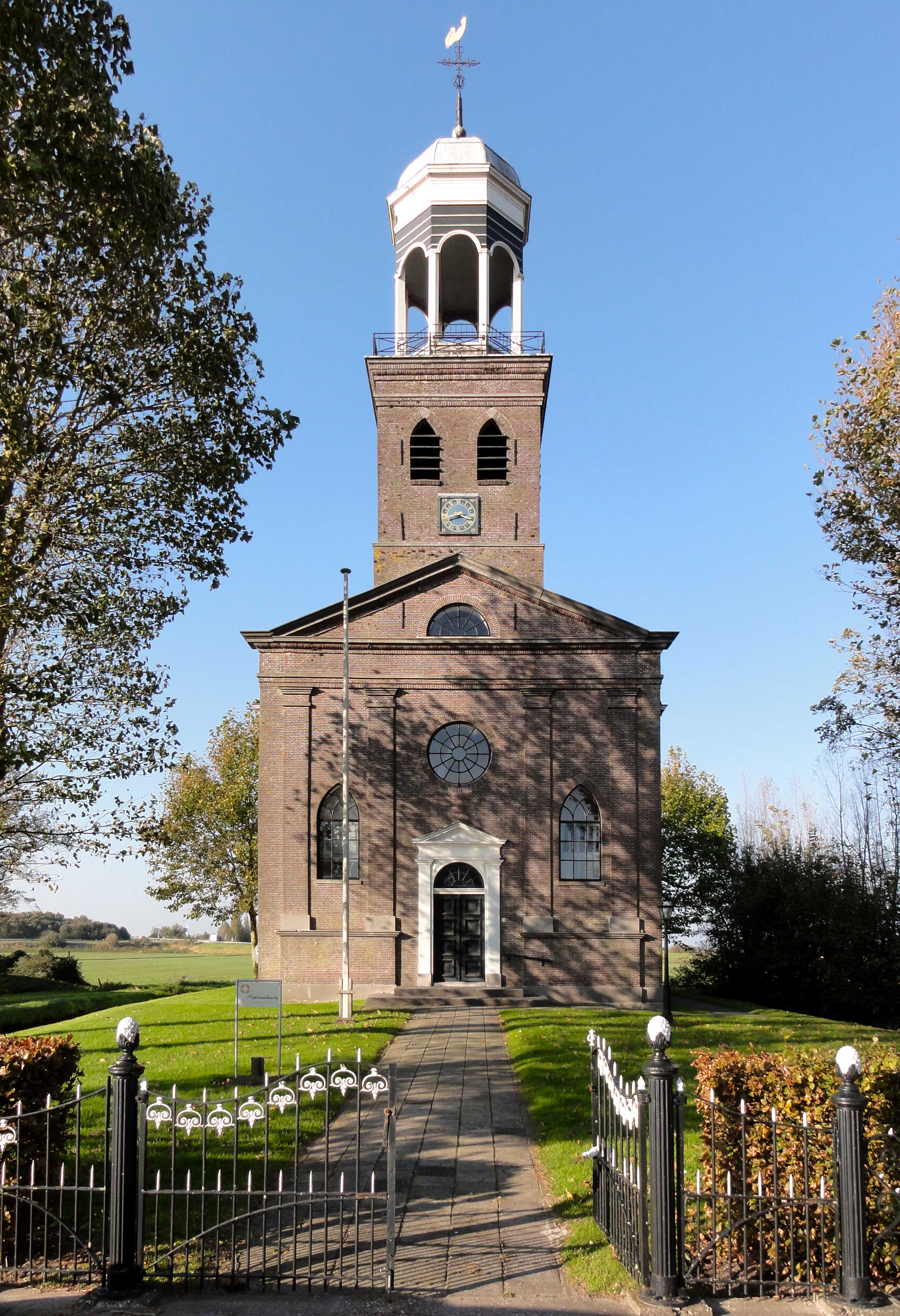
- Oosterzee church

- Flag Coat of arms

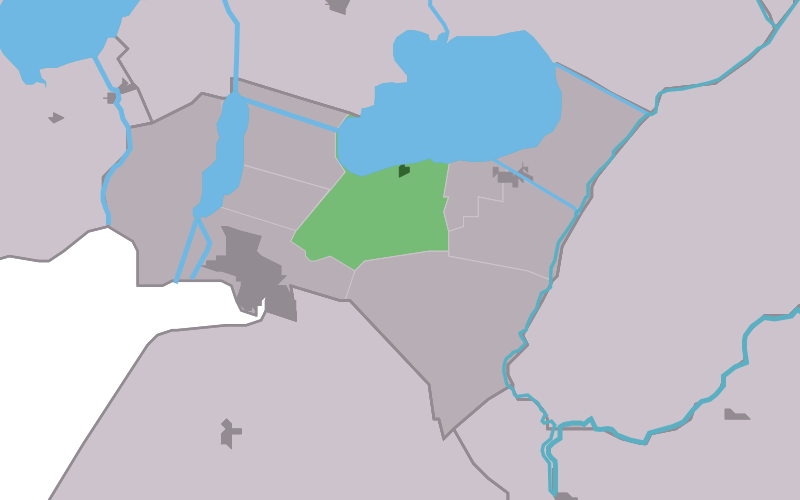
- Location in the former Lemsterlân municipality

- Location in the Netherlands Oosterzee (Netherlands)
- Country: Netherlands
- Province: Friesland
- Municipality: De Fryske Marren

Area
  - Total: 15.62 km^{2} (6.03 sq mi)
- Elevation: −0.4 m (−1.3 ft)

Population (2021)
  - Total: 930
  - Density: 60/km^{2} (150/sq mi)
- Time zone: UTC+1 (CET)
  - Summer (DST): UTC+2 (CEST)
- Postal code: 8536
- Dialing code: 0514

Oosterzee (West Frisian: Eastersee) is a village in De Fryske Marren municipality in the province of Friesland, the Netherlands. It had a population of around 915 including surrounding area in 2017.

== History ==
The village was first mentioned in 1179 as Oesterze, and means eastern lake and is a reference to Tjeukemeer. Oosterzee was a road village which started in the Middle Ages as two settlements: Oosterzee-Buren and Oosterzee-Gietersebrug. From the 18th century onwards, peat excavation and poldering transformed the area into cultivated land.

The Dutch Reformed Church was built in 1860 in the neoclassical style as a replacement of a medieval church which is located outside the village center. In 1840, it was home to 880 people. In 1892, a dairy factory opened in Oosterzee, and closed in 1993. The factory was demolished in 2006 and replaced by a marina and a villa ward, however the chimney remains, because telecommunication companies used the chimney.

Before 2014, Oosterzee was part of the Lemsterland municipality. This municipality has since merged into De Fryske Marren municipality.

== Gallery ==
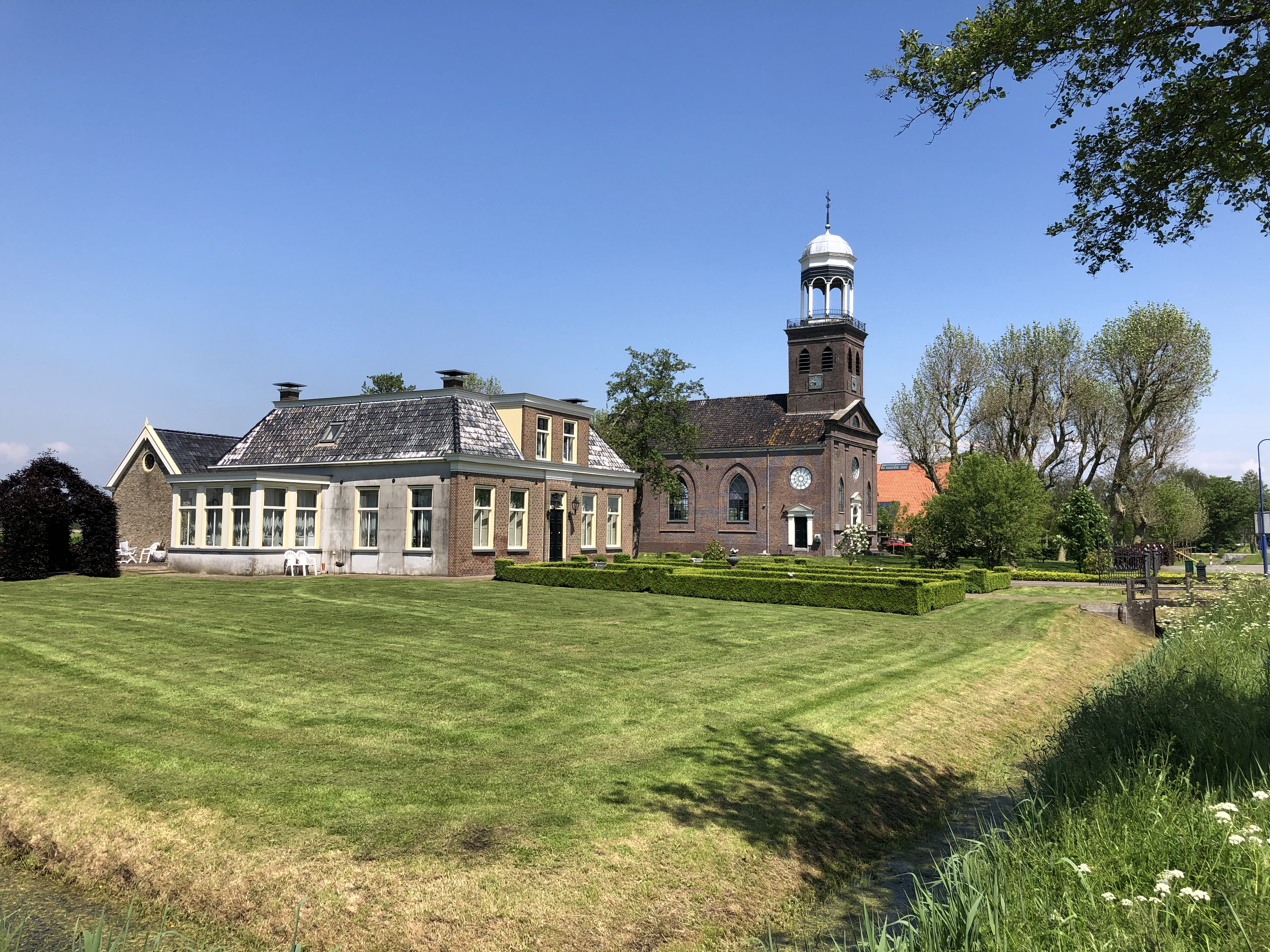
Village view

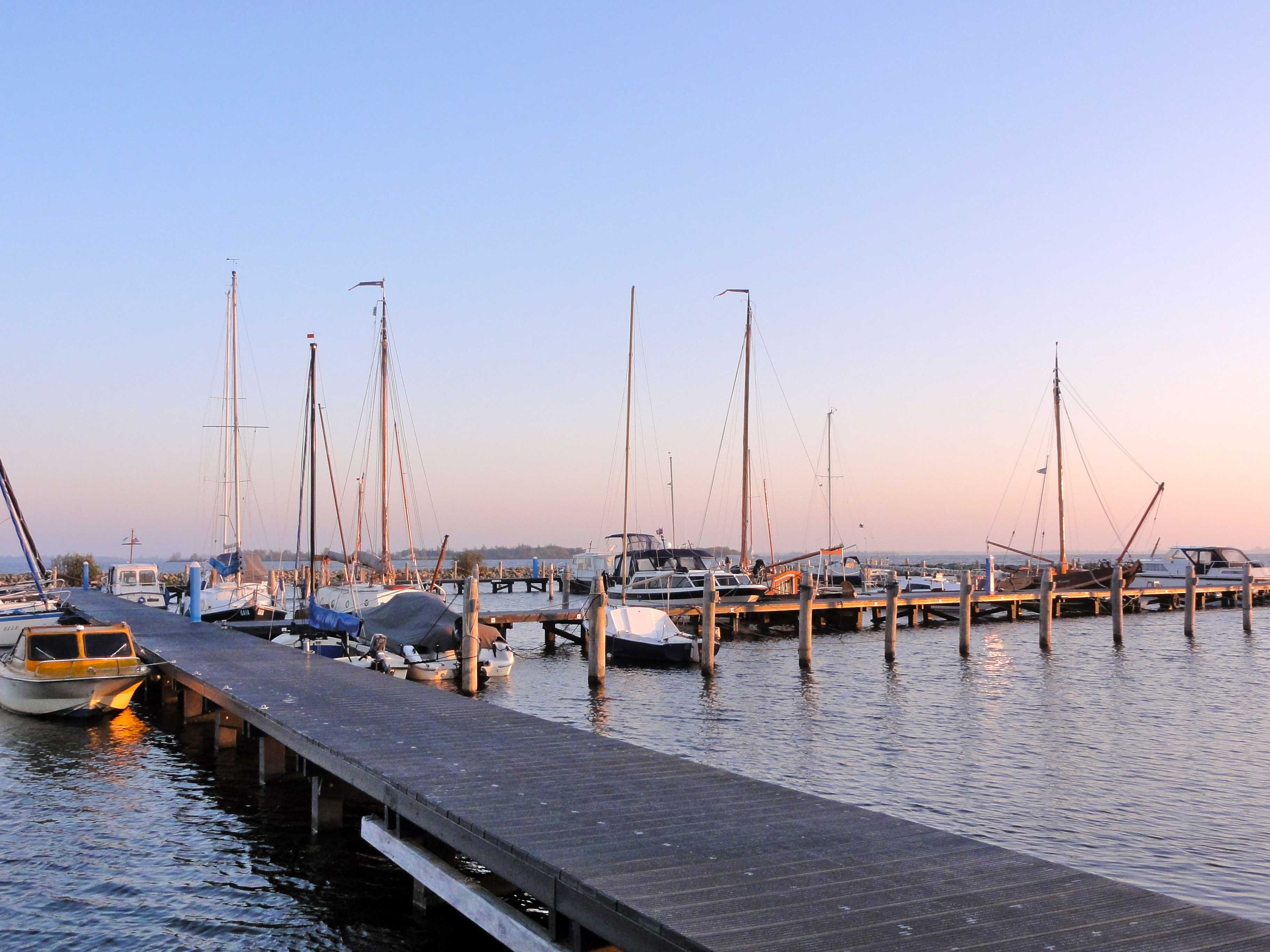
Marina of Oosterzee

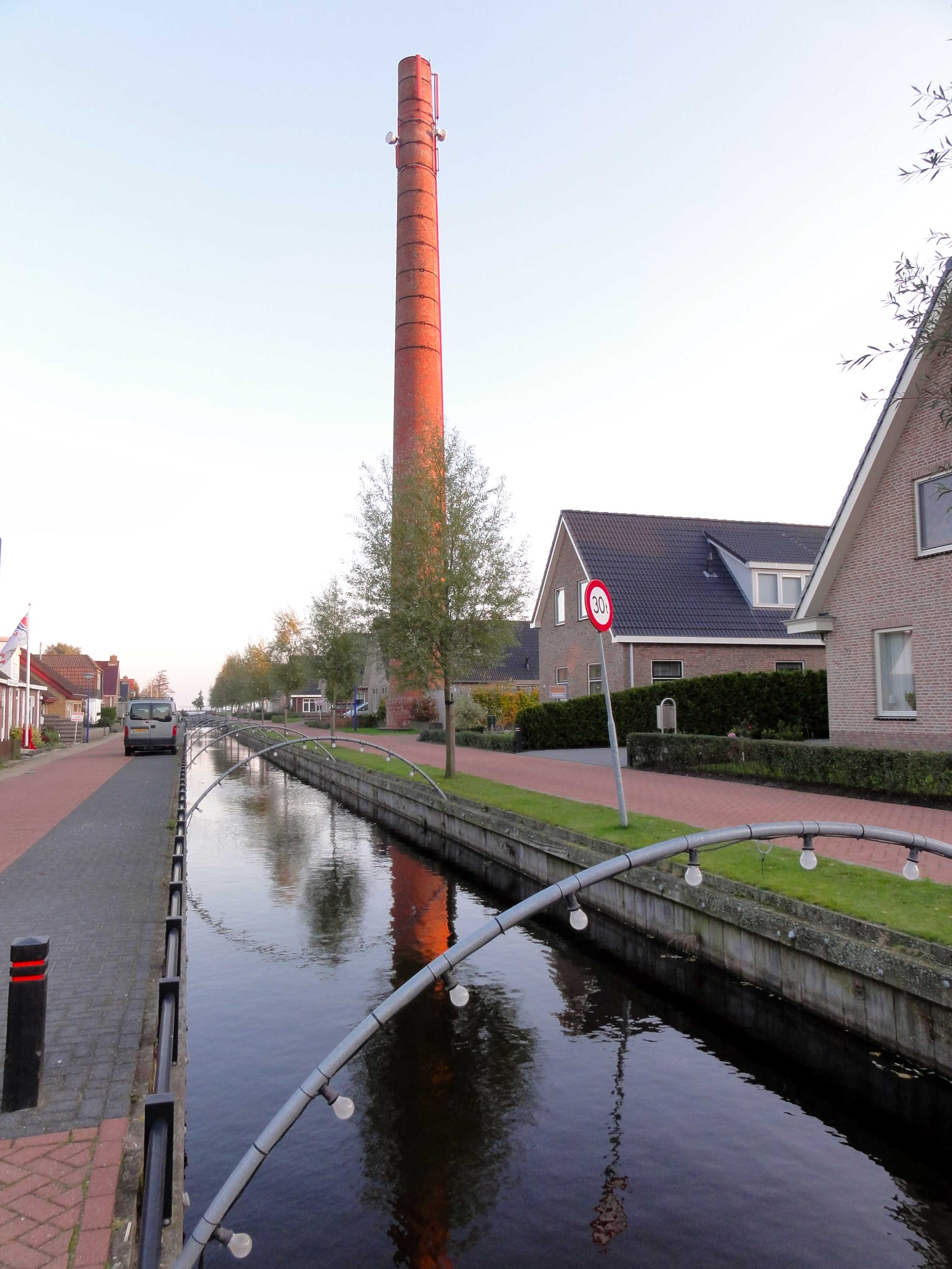
Chimney of the former dairy factory

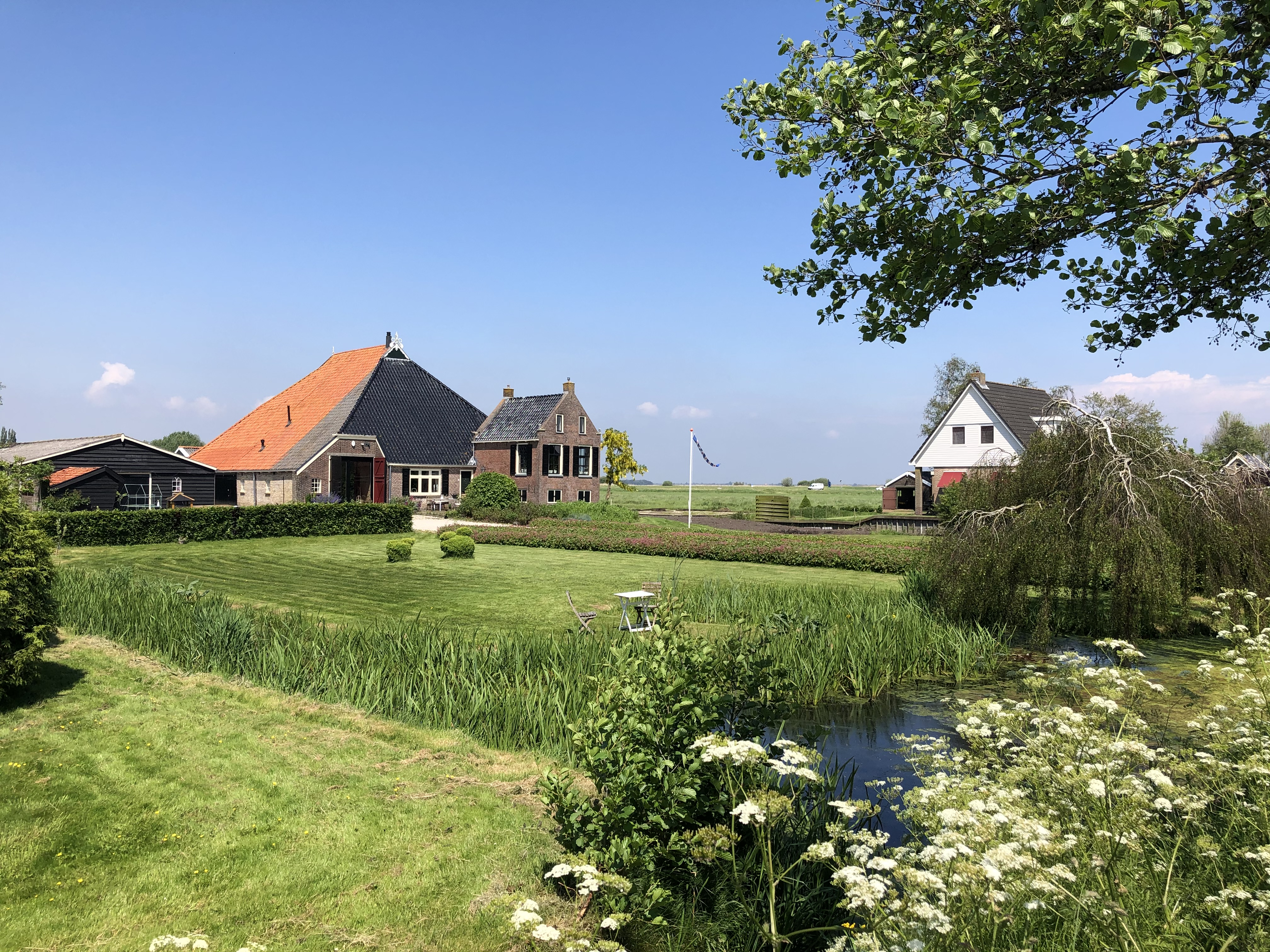
Farms in Oosterzee
