= Miedum =

- Hamlet
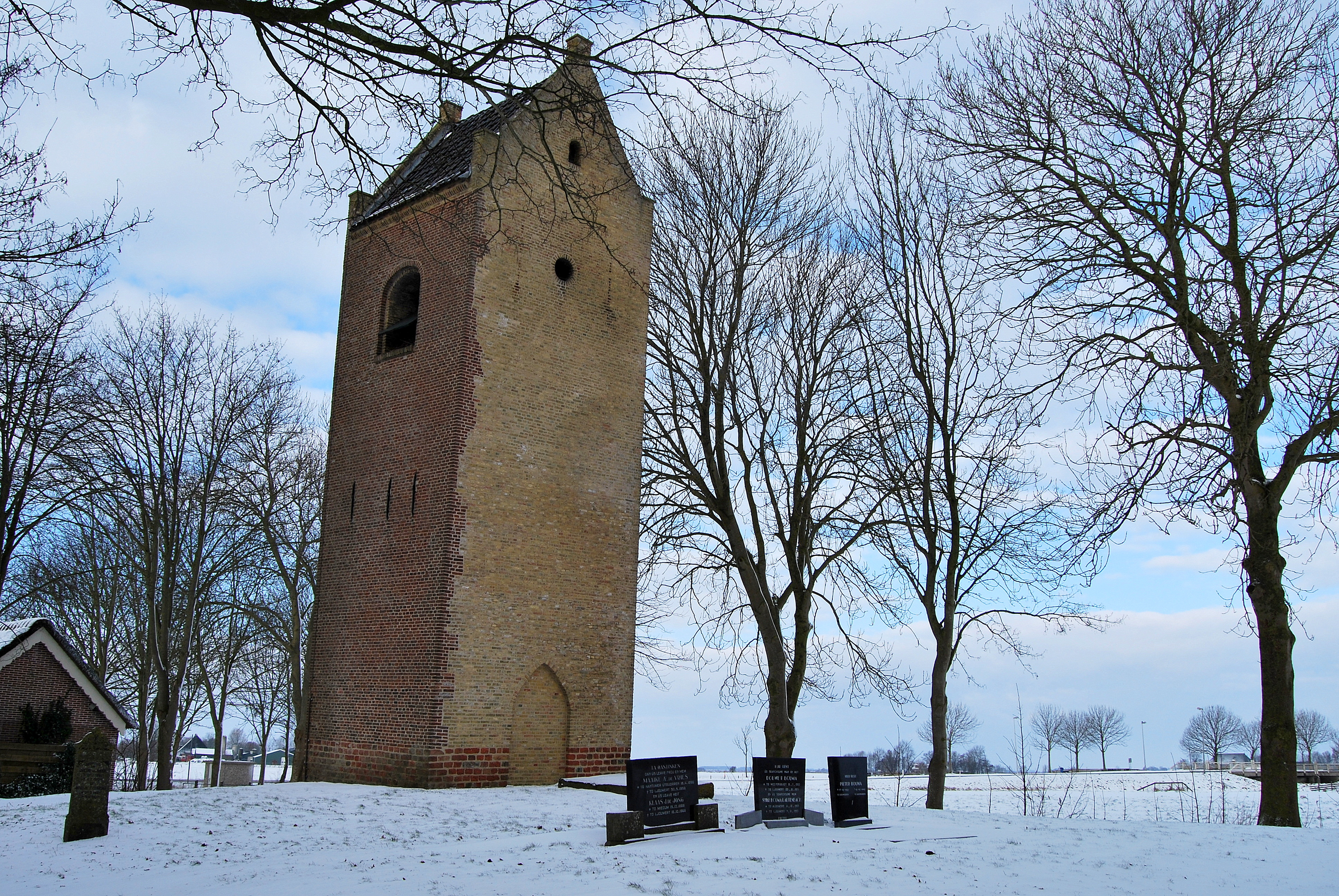
- Miedum, church tower

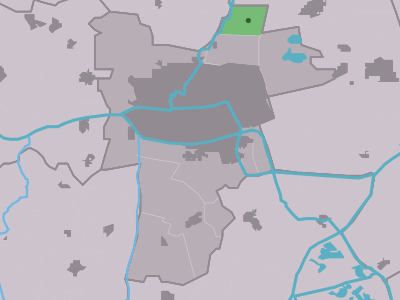
- Location in Leeuwarden municipality

- Location in the Netherlands Miedum (Netherlands)
- Country: Netherlands
- Province: Friesland
- Municipality: Leeuwarden

Area
  - Total: 5.02 km^{2} (1.94 sq mi)
- Elevation: −0.2 m (−0.66 ft)

Population (2021)
  - Total: 50
  - Density: 10/km^{2} (26/sq mi)
- Time zone: UTC+1 (CET)
  - Summer (DST): UTC+2 (CEST)
- Postal code: 9082
- Dialing code: 058

Miedum is a hamlet in Leeuwarden municipality in the province of Friesland, the Netherlands.

The height of the leaning tower of Miedum is 14 metres (45.93 feet). The approximate tilt at the top of the tower is 115 centimetres (3 ft 9 in). Relatively speaking, it is the most displaced church tower of the Netherlands, and the second most leaning tower of Europe after Suurhusen.

== History ==
The village was first mentioned in 1415 as Medemma gha, and means "settlement on the hay land". Miedum shares a statistical area and postal code with the countryside of Lekkum, but it does have place name signs. The church was built in 1620, but demolished in 1834 and only the leaning church tower has remained. In 1955, the foundation of the tower was strengthened to prevent collapse during a storm. In 1840, Miedum was home to 62 people. Nowadays, it consists of about a dozen houses.

Before 1944, Miedum was part of Leeuwarderadeel municipality.

== Gallery ==
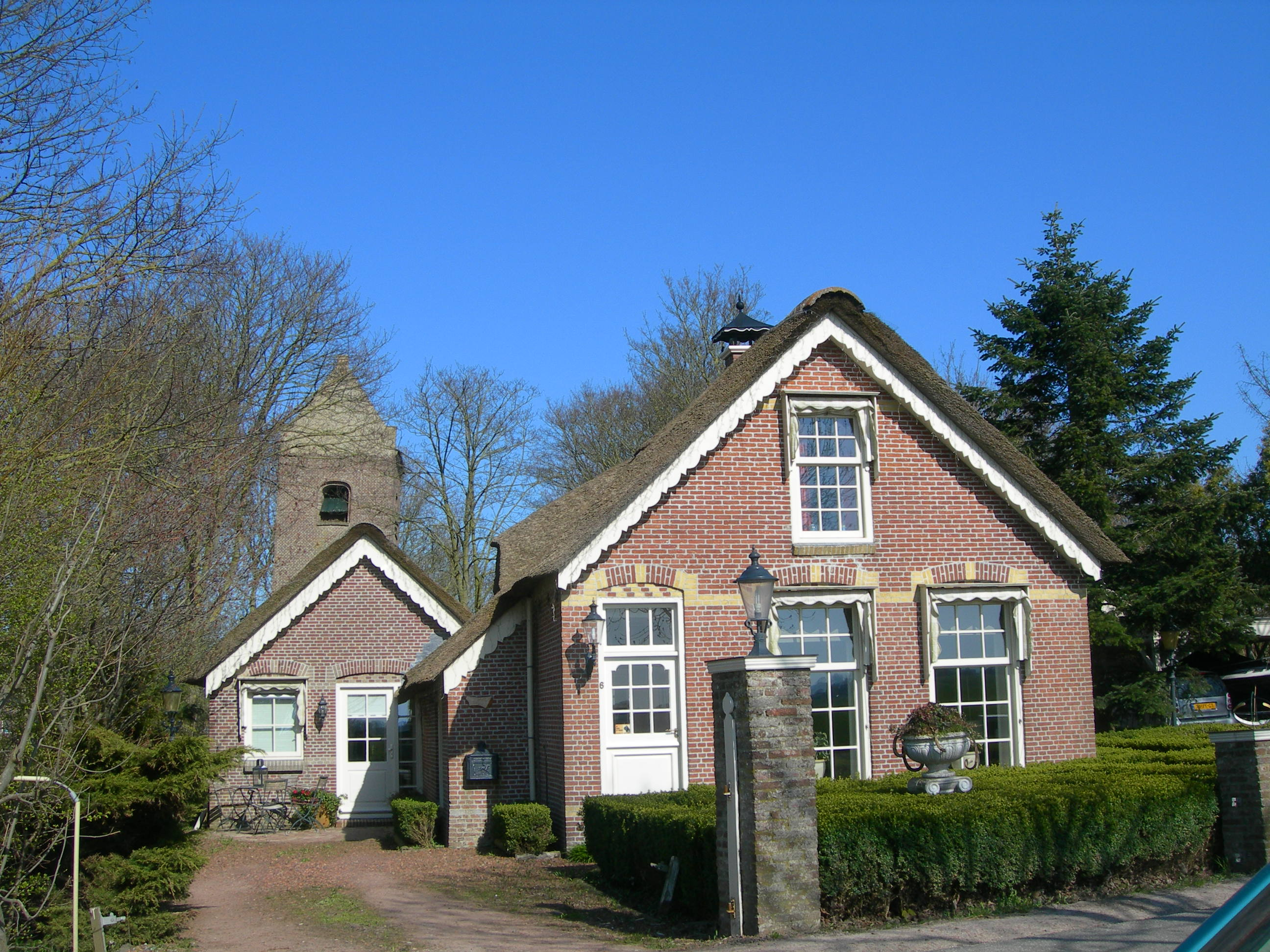
House in Miedum

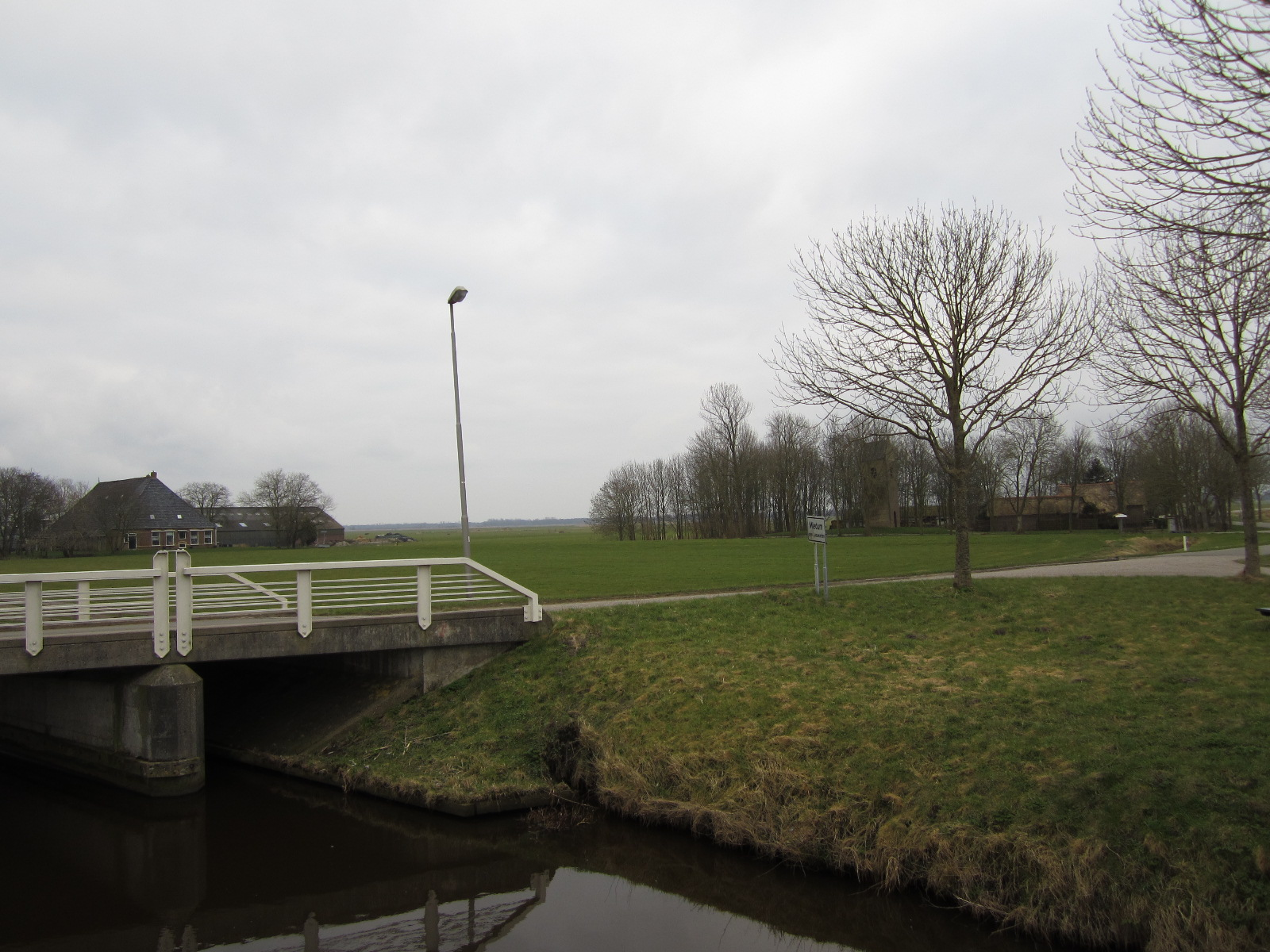
Farms in Miedum
