= Boekhorst =

Boekhorst is a surname of Dutch origin. People with the name include:

- Blaine Boekhorst (born 1993), Australian rules footballer
- Fieke Boekhorst (born 1957), Dutch hockey player
- Sven Boekhorst (born 1980), Dutch skater

== See also ==
- Vrije en Lage Boekhorst ("Free and Low Boekhorst"), an abolished municipality in South Holland
