= Zuiderburen =

Zuiderburen was an art exhibition held at the Mauritshuis, The Hague, Netherlands. The theme was Portraits from Flanders 1400–1700. The exhibition ran from 7 September 2017 to 14 January 2018. The official name of the exhibition in English is Neighbours; a precise translation would be Southern Neighbours.

Reviews were largely favourable; the NRC newspaper gave it four out of five stars, noting that it "was a beautiful selection but too limited to be representative of three centuries." The Volkskrant newspaper also gave it four stars.
