= Gytsjerksterhoeke =

Gytsjerksterhoek Giekerkerhoek
- Hamlet
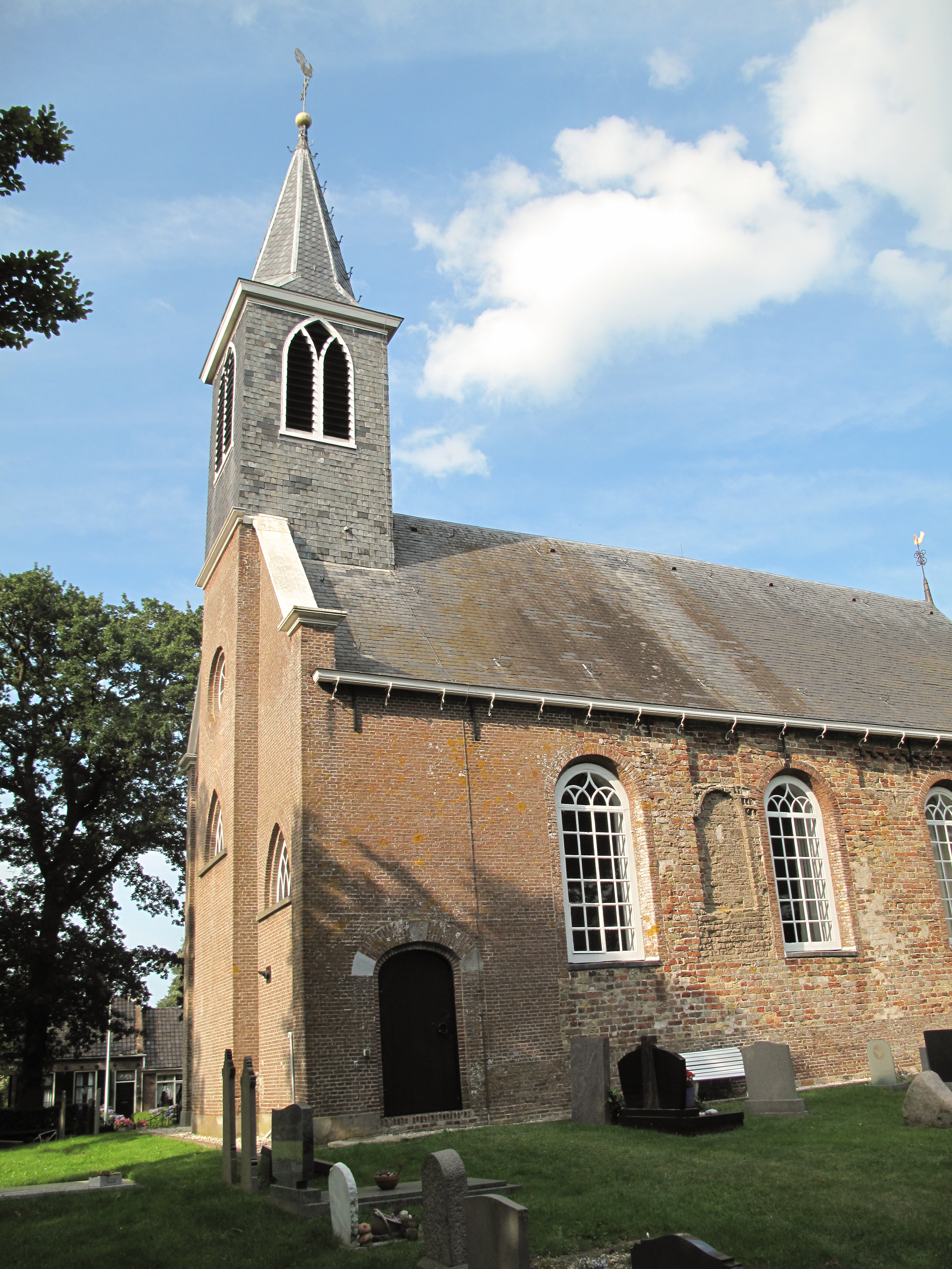
- St Martin Church

- Location in the Netherlands Gytsjerksterhoek (Netherlands)
- Coordinates: 53°14′18″N 5°52′44″E
- Country: Netherlands
- Province: Friesland
- Municipality: Tytsjerksteradiel
- Time zone: UTC+1 (CET)
  - Summer (DST): UTC+2 (CEST)
- Postal code: 9061
- Dialing code: 058

Gytsjerksterhoek (Dutch: Giekerkerhoek) is a hamlet in Tytsjerksteradiel in the province of Friesland, the Netherlands.

Gytsjerksterhoeke is not a statistical entity, and the postal authorities have placed it under Gytsjerk. It does not have place name signs. The name was first used around 1960. It consists of about 20 houses, and if the west side is included about 30 houses.

The hamlet is centred around the St Martin Church which is located outside of the village of Gytsjerk and dates from around 1100. The main settlement moved to the east leaving a tiny hamlet around the church. There is a still a little so-called woudhuisje (wood house) in the hamlet. These were tiny self build houses most of which have disappeared.
