= Sprong =

Sprong is a surname. Notable people with the surname include:

- Daniel Sprong (born 1997), Dutch ice hockey player
- Russell Sprong (1894–1956), American football and basketball coach
- Teunis Sprong (1889–1971), Dutch long-distance runner
