= Terschelling =

West Frisian island in the Netherlands

Terschelling Skylge
- Municipality and island
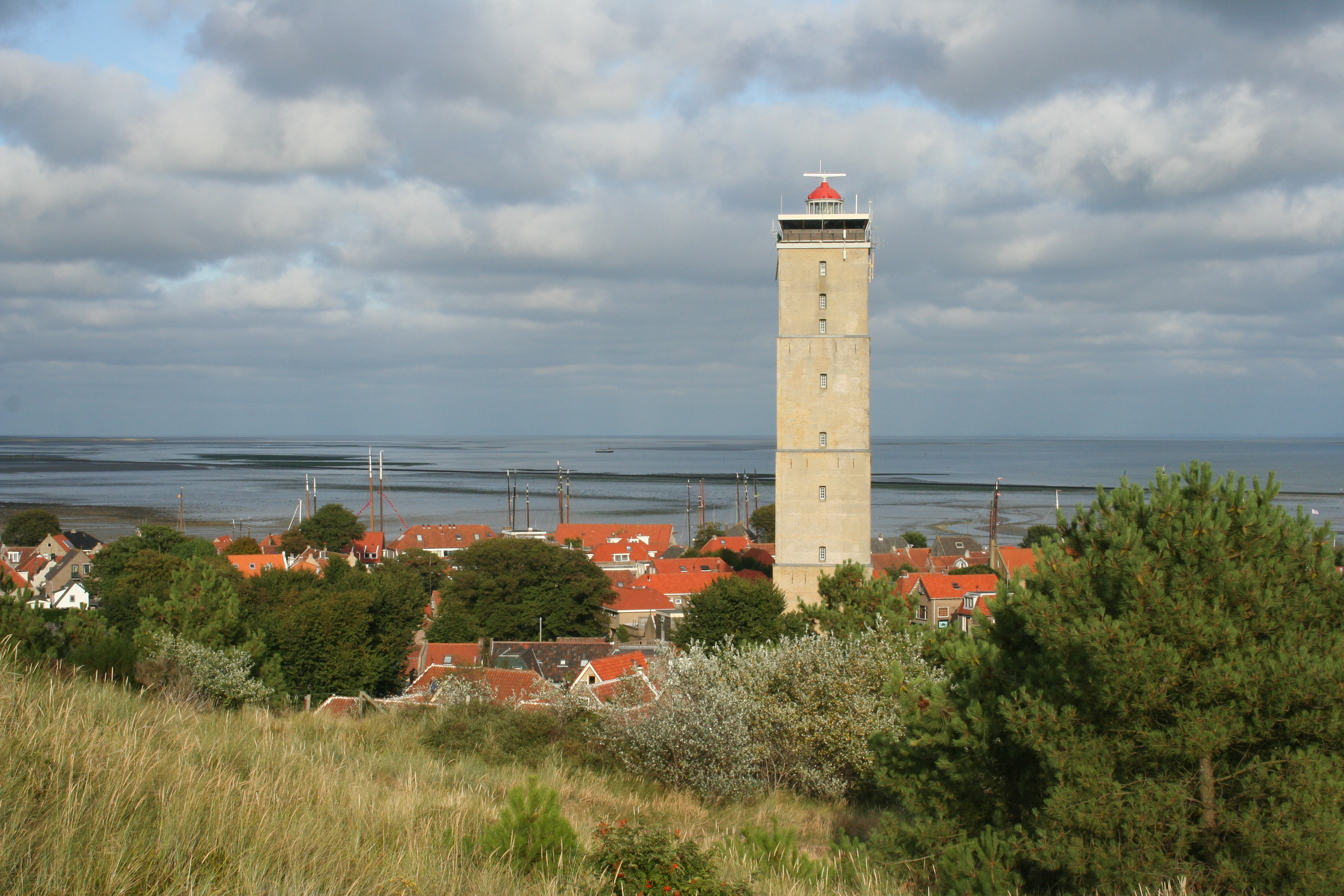
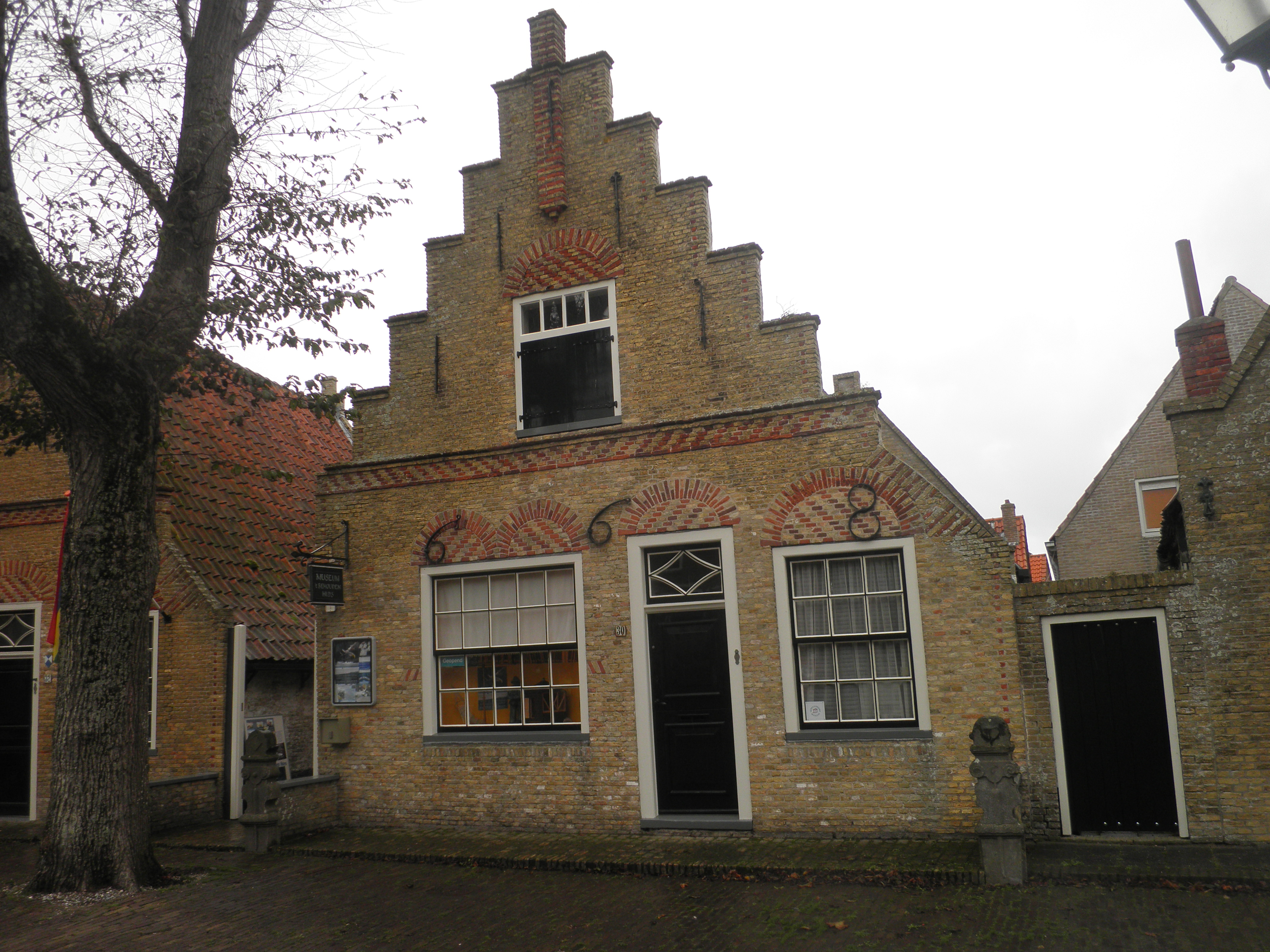
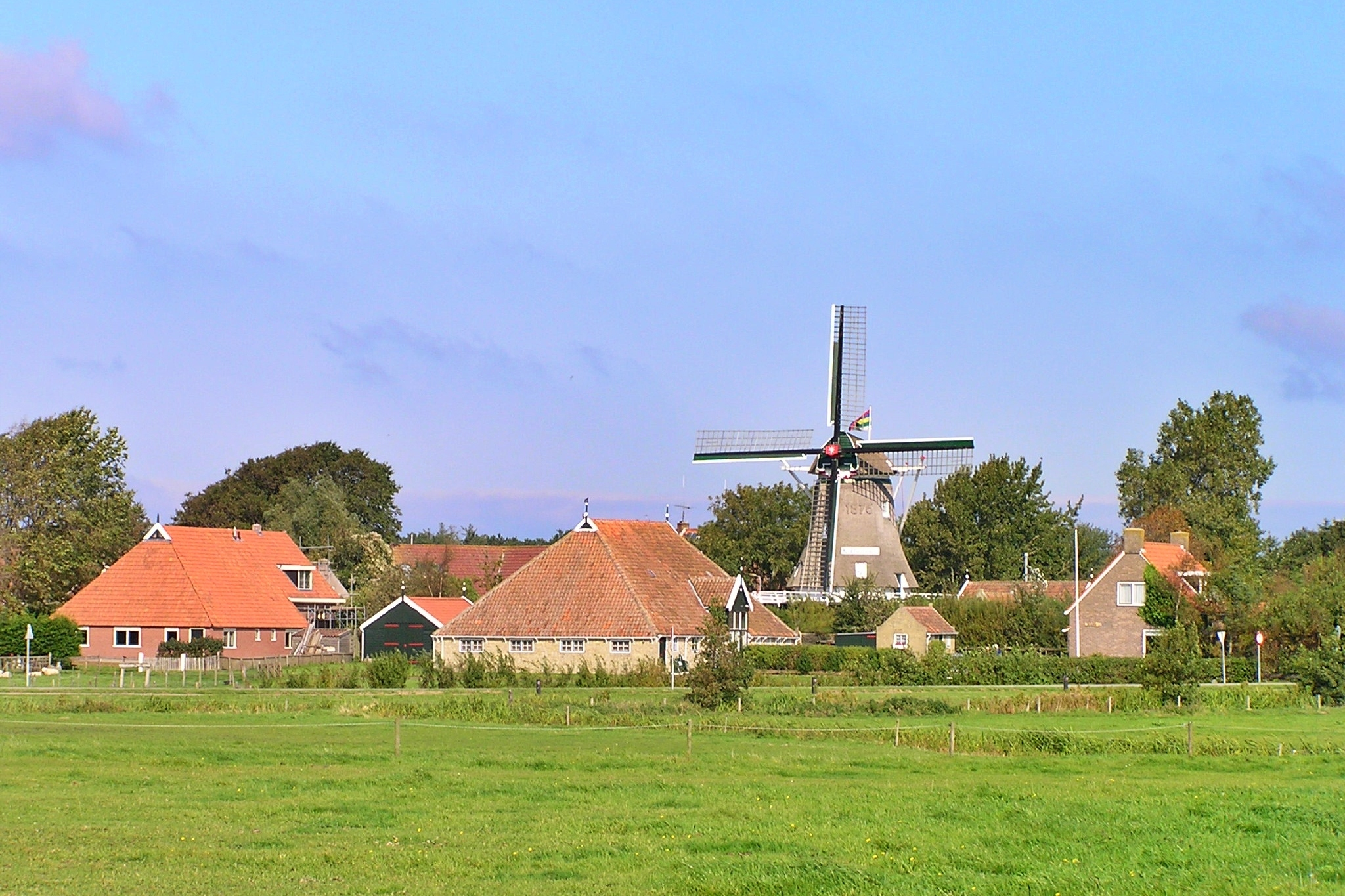
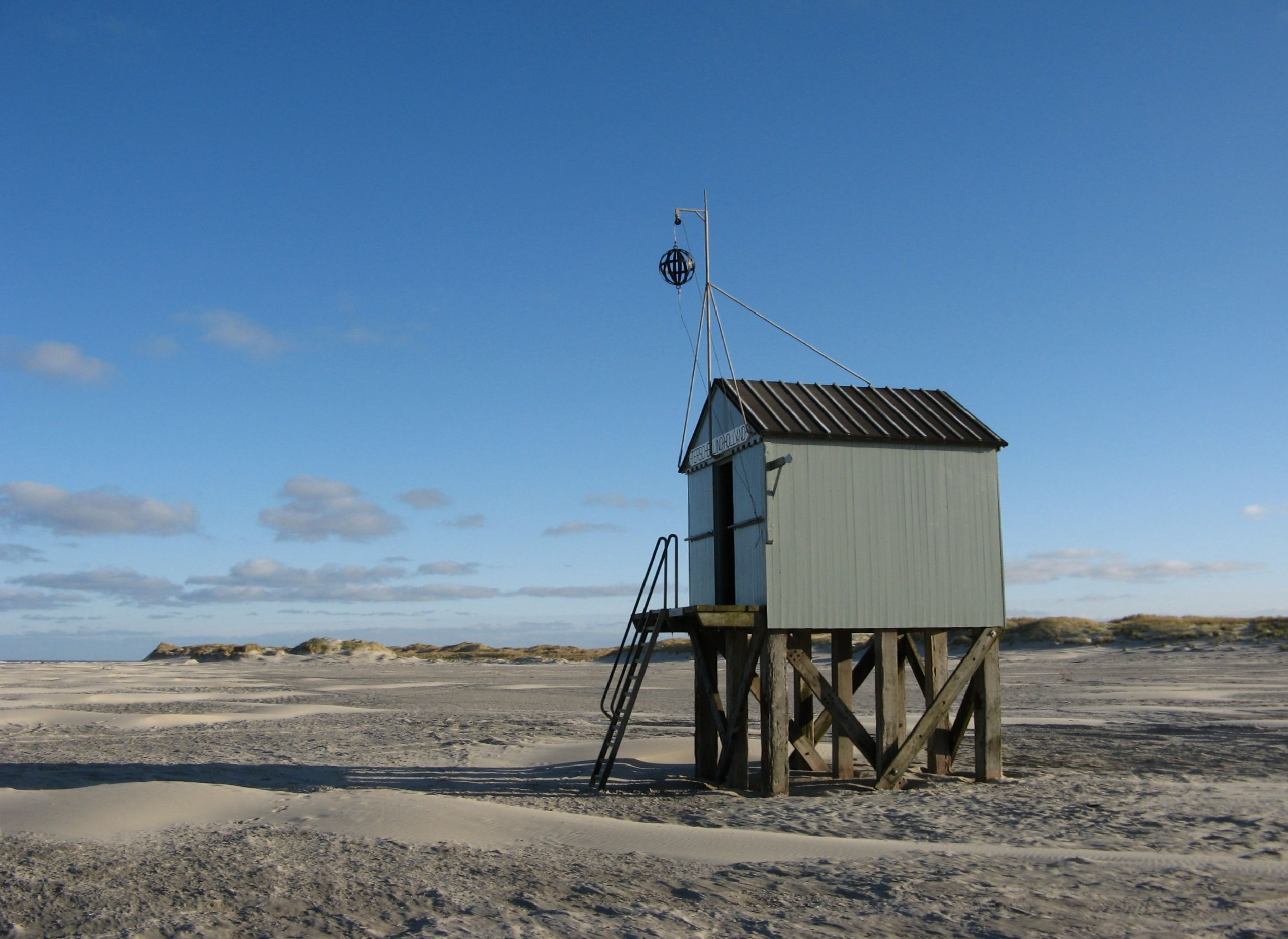
- Lighthouse Museum West-Terschelling Mill of Formerum Emergency shelter for shipwreck victims

- Flag Coat of arms

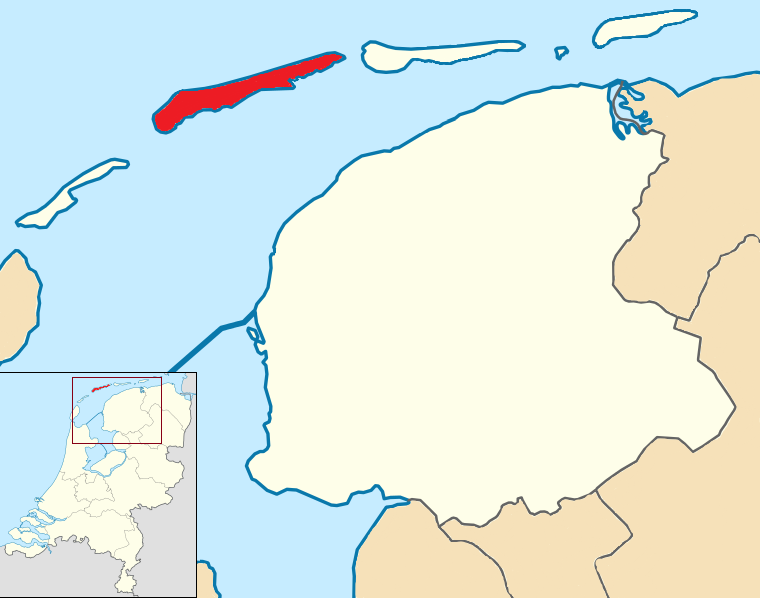
- Location in Friesland
- Coordinates: 53°24′N 5°19′E
- Country: Netherlands
- Province: Friesland

Government
  - Body: Municipal council
  - Mayor: Caroline van de Pol (VVD)

Area
  - Total: 673.99 km^{2} (260.23 sq mi)
  - Land: 85.26 km^{2} (32.92 sq mi)
  - Water: 588.73 km^{2} (227.31 sq mi)
- Elevation: 6 m (20 ft)

Population (January 2021)
  - Total: 4,870
  - Density: 57/km^{2} (150/sq mi)
- Demonym: Terschellinger
- Time zone: UTC+1 (CET)
  - Summer (DST): UTC+2 (CEST)
- Postcode: 8880–8897
- Area code: 0562
- Website: www.terschelling.nl

Ramsar Wetland
- Official name: Duinen Terschelling
- Designated: 29 August 2000
- Reference no.: 2215

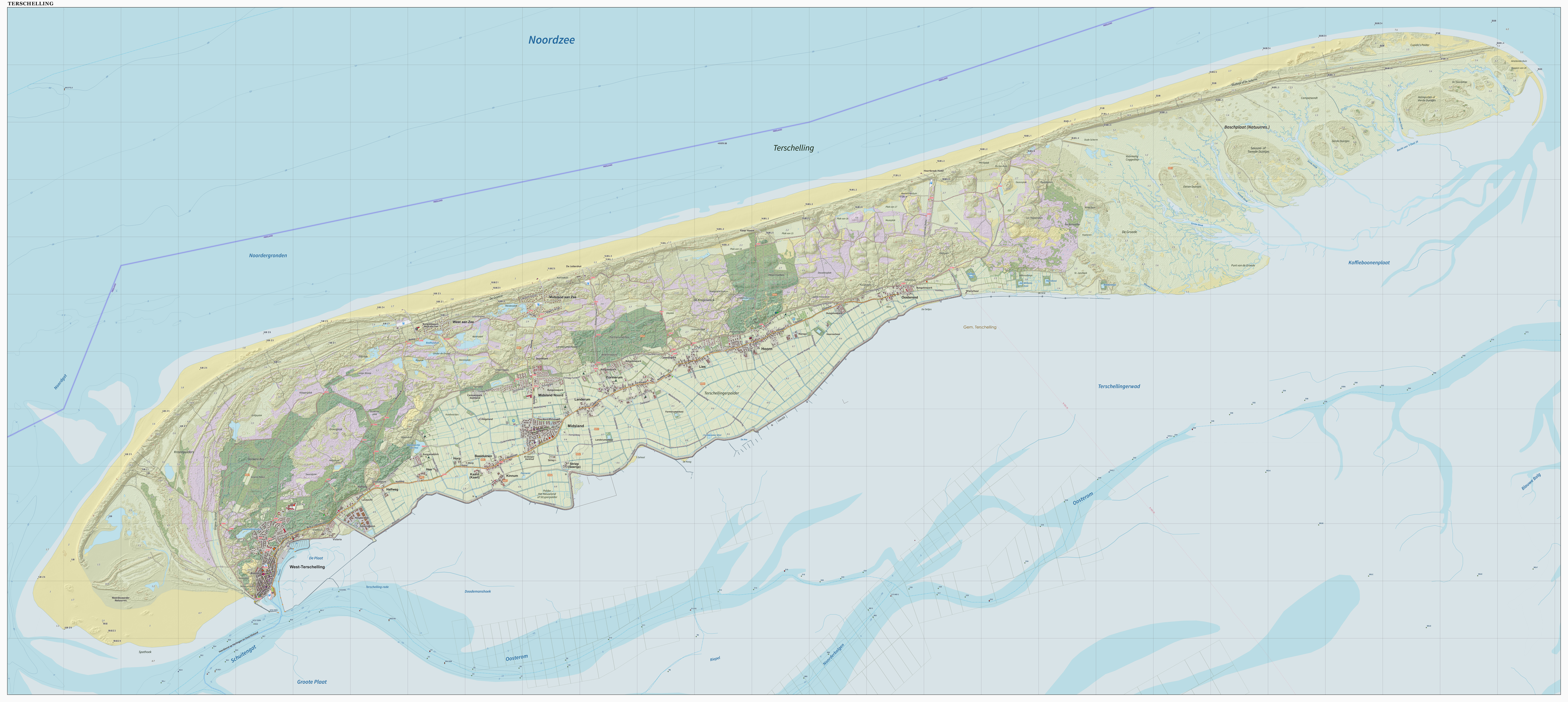
Dutch Topographic map of Terschelling, December 2015

Aerial view from the southwest

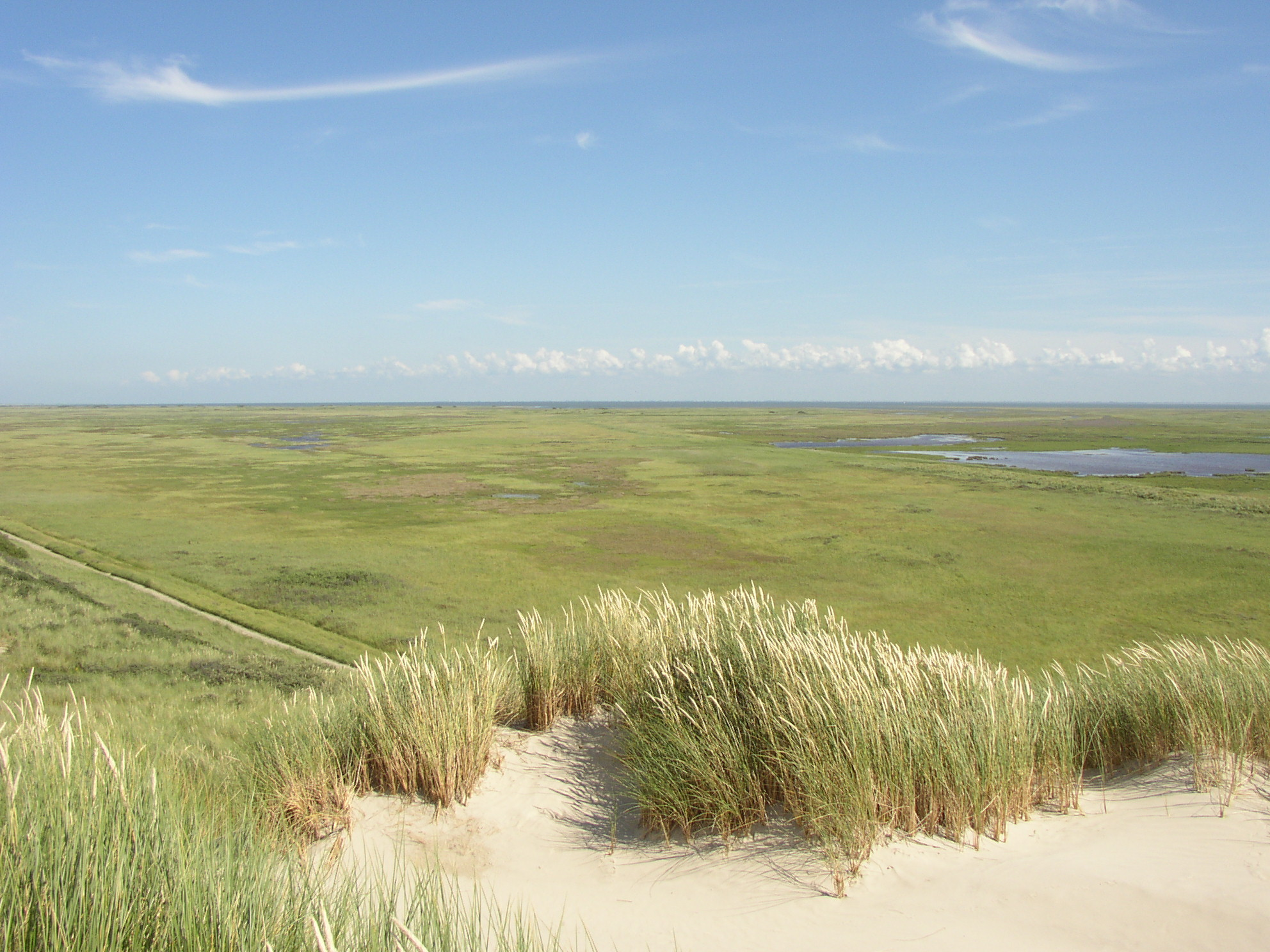
The Boschplaat

Terschelling (Dutch pronunciation: [tɛrˈsxɛlɪŋ]; West Frisian: Skylge; Terschelling dialect: Schylge) is a municipality and an island in the northern Netherlands, one of the West Frisian Islands. It is situated between the islands of Vlieland and Ameland.

Wadden Islanders are known for their resourcefulness in using anything and everything that washes ashore. With few trees to use for timber, most of the farms and barns are built with masts recovered from shipwrecks. The islands are surrounded by shipwrecks, and even today many containers wash ashore that have blown off the decks of container ships in the North Sea.

The main source of income on Terschelling is tourism. There is some agriculture, but a large part of the island has become a nature reserve.

Terschelling is well known for the yearly Oerol Festival during which theatre performances are played throughout the island, making use of its landscape and nature.

Terschelling can be reached by ferry from the mainland Frisian town Harlingen and in summer from Vlieland by high-speed catamaran.

== History ==
The island in its current shape formed in the Middle Ages from a sandy area called De Schelling in the west and the original island Wexalia in the east. The name Wexalia, Wuxalia, or Wecsile is the medieval name of eastern Terschelling. However, this name disappeared at the end of the Middle Ages. The last appearance of the name Wexalia is in a treaty between Folkerus Reijner Popma, then ruler of Terschelling, with king Edward IV of England in 1482.

The oldest traces of civilization on Terschelling date from around 850, when a small wooden church was built on a hill near Seeryp or Stryp (Striep). This hill was later used as a burial ground and is known as the "Strieperkerkhof".

Historically, tensions existed between the inhabitants of West-Terschelling, with its strong orientation towards the sea, and the more agriculturally oriented inhabitants of East-Terschelling. In 1612 this led to the division of the island into independent political entities, West-Terschelling and East-Terschelling. Only after the French occupation at the start of the 19th century was Terschelling again united as one entity.

The Dutch navigator Willem Barentsz was born on Terschelling around 1550.

In 1666 West-Terschelling was ransacked by the English. The English fleet had originally planned to attack the Dutch merchant fleet which was moored before the coast of Vlieland, the next island to the west. When the Dutch vessels retreated towards Terschelling, the English followed, destroyed 150 Dutch vessels, and landed in the harbour of West Terschelling. The town was burnt to the ground by the English on this occasion which would become known as "Holmes's Bonfire" after the English admiral Sir Robert Holmes. The Great Fire of London in the very same year was considered by some to have been God's retribution. The next year, in 1667, the Dutch under command of De Ruyter executed a retaliatory expedition, and dealt the English navy a heavy blow at the Raid on the Medway (also known as the Battle of Chatham), in effect ending the Second Anglo-Dutch War.

In 1799, HMS Lutine, a British frigate loaded with British gold, sank on the western Terschelling coast (was erroneously quoted in the lemma on Texel) in a storm. Her wreck shifted in the sands; despite several intensive, well-financed searches, only a few treasures have been found. A beaker made from a silver bar is displayed in the National Maritime Museum at Greenwich. Her bell was recovered and is now in the headquarters of Lloyd's of London, where it is tolled before announcing important news.

Until 1942 Terschelling, like Vlieland, was part of the province of North Holland.

== Language ==
On the island of Terschelling both Dutch, the national language of the Netherlands, and Frisian are spoken. Historically, Frisian dialects have dominated on the western and eastern sides of the island while a Dutch dialect called Midslands has been the main language of Midsland and the surrounding area at the center of the island. However, the use of the three dialects is on the decline, and all three are slowly being replaced by the standard Dutch language.

== Cranberries ==
The island is known for being one of only two Wadden islands where cranberries grow, the other being the island of Vlieland. In 1840, a barrel of cranberries, apparently packed by sailors as an antiscorbutic, washed ashore on the island's coast, and the islanders cultivated them for their own sailors.

The cranberries, finding the environment favorable, established themselves on the island. Nowadays, the cranberry fields cover 0.48 km^{2} (0.185 sq mi) or 48 ha (119 acres). The cranberries are mainly sold to tourists and used by the island's restaurants and bakeries.

== Population centres ==
Areas in Terschelling are the following: (Standard West Frisian names in brackets)

- Baaiduinen (Baaidunen)
- Formerum (Formearum)
- Hee
- Hoorn (Hoarne)
- Kaard
- Kinnum (Kinum)
- Landerum
- Lies
- Midsland (Midslân)
- Midsland aan Zee (Midslân oan See)
- Midsland-Noord (Midslân-Noard)
- Oosterend (Easterein)
- Seerijp (Stryp)
- West aan Zee (West)
- West-Terschelling (seat) (West-Schylge)

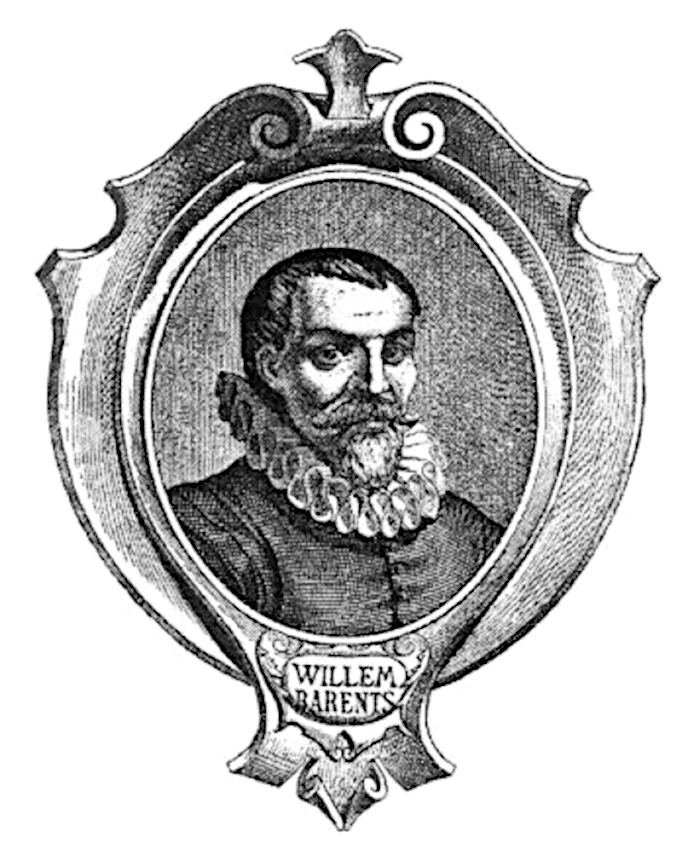
portrait of Willem Barents, 16/17 C

== Notable people ==
- Bauck Poppema (died 1501), legendary Dutch heroine
- Willem Barentsz (c. 1550 – 1597), Dutch navigator, cartographer and Arctic explorer; the Barents Sea was named after him.
- Frank I. Kooyman (1880–1963), Dutch hymnwriter
- Hessel van der Kooij (born 1955), Dutch singer
- Joris Voest (born 1995), Dutch professional footballer

== Sister cities ==
Terschelling has the following sister city:

- Friday Harbor, Washington, United States of America

== Gallery ==
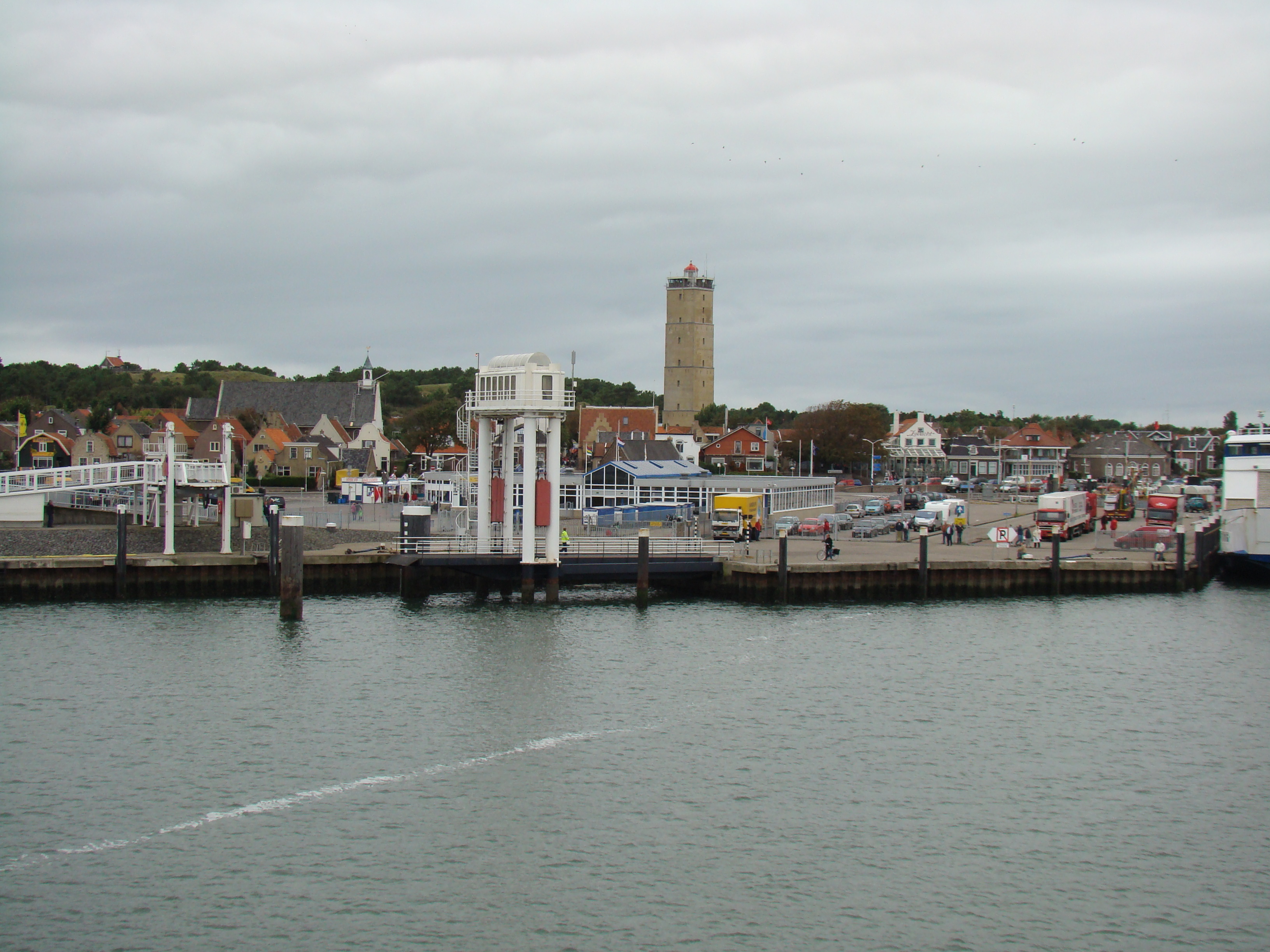
the isle of Terschelling

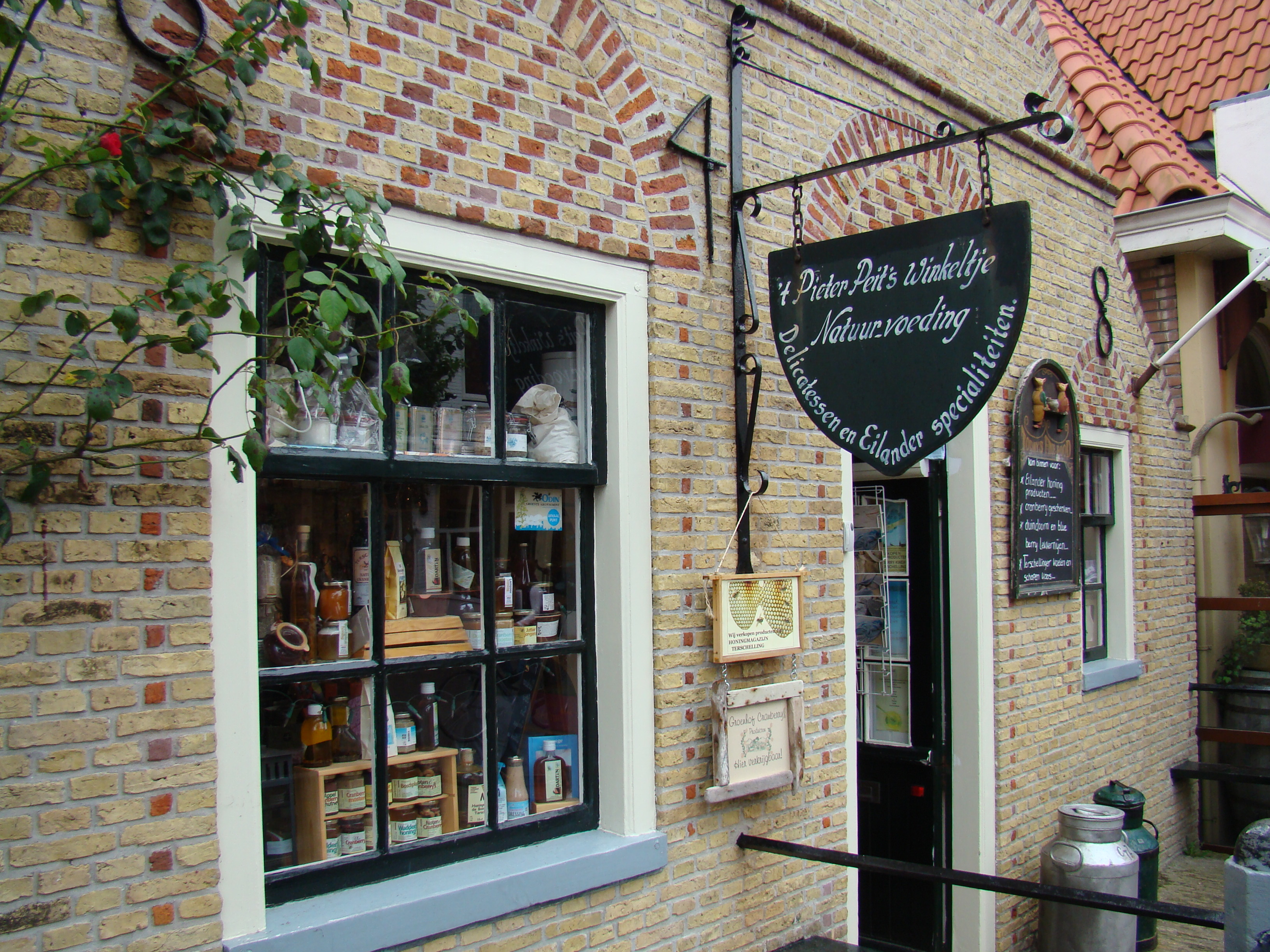
Shop in Terschelling

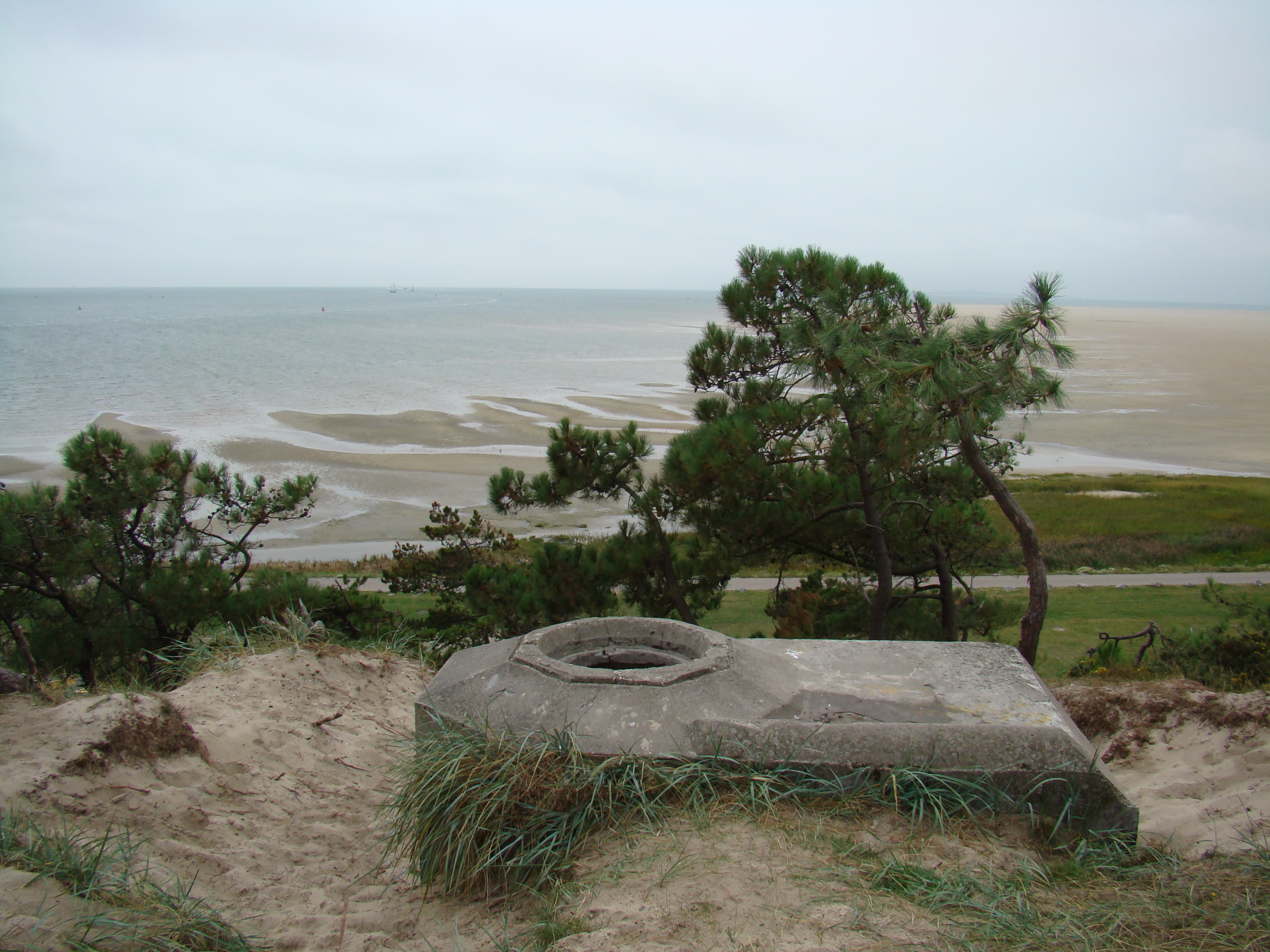
the isle of Terschelling

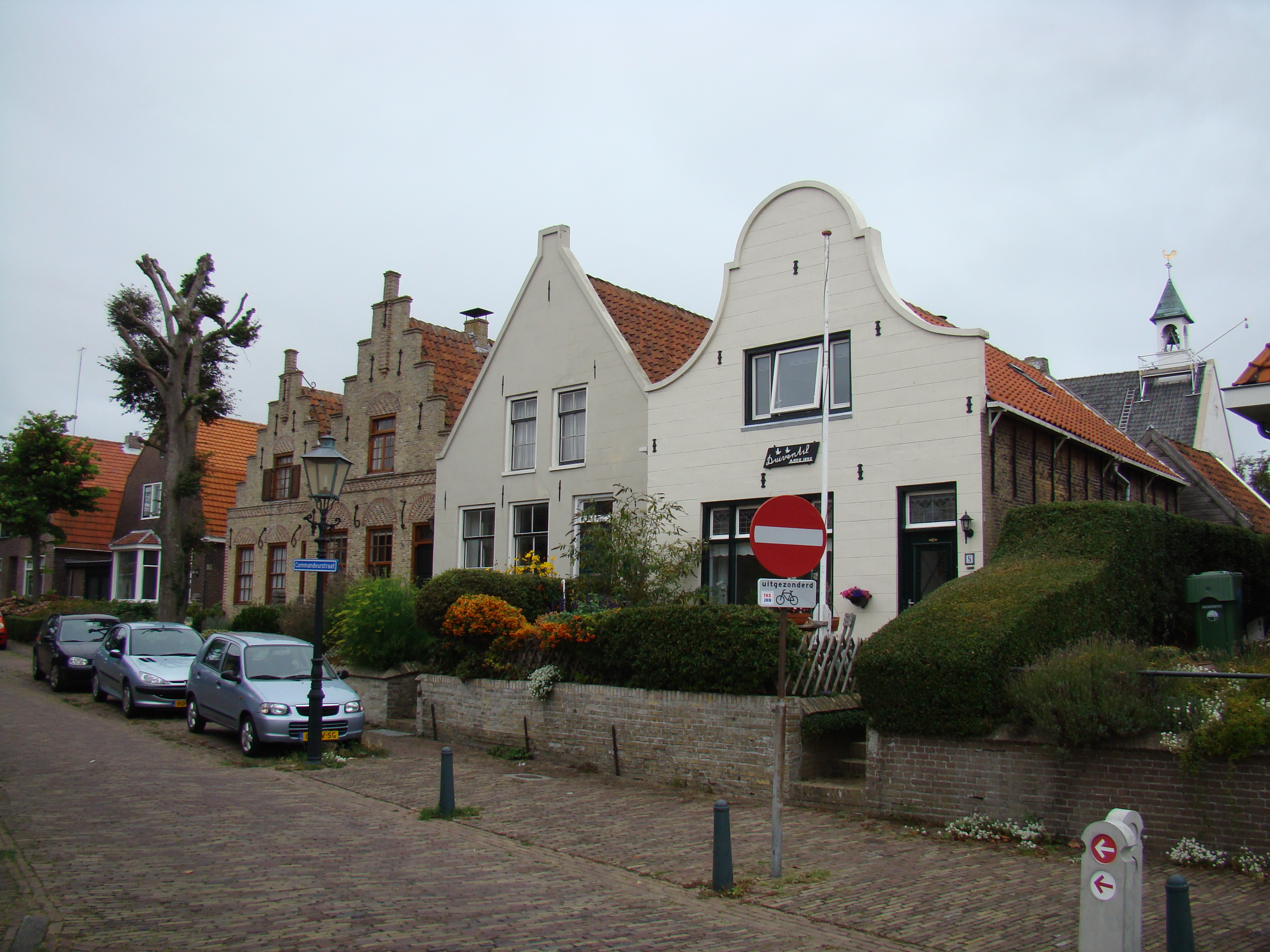
Terschelling, Commandeurstraat
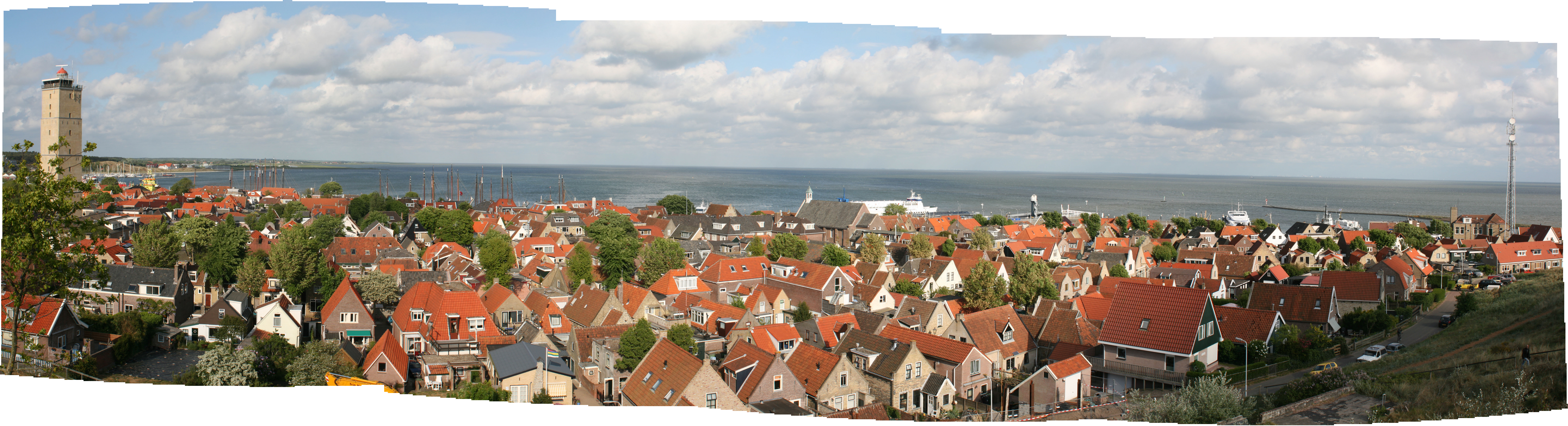
Panorama of Terschelling, including Brandaris, the lighthouse of Terschelling.

== See also ==
- Oan Schylge, the island's anthem
