= Kinnum =

Kinnum Kinum
- Village
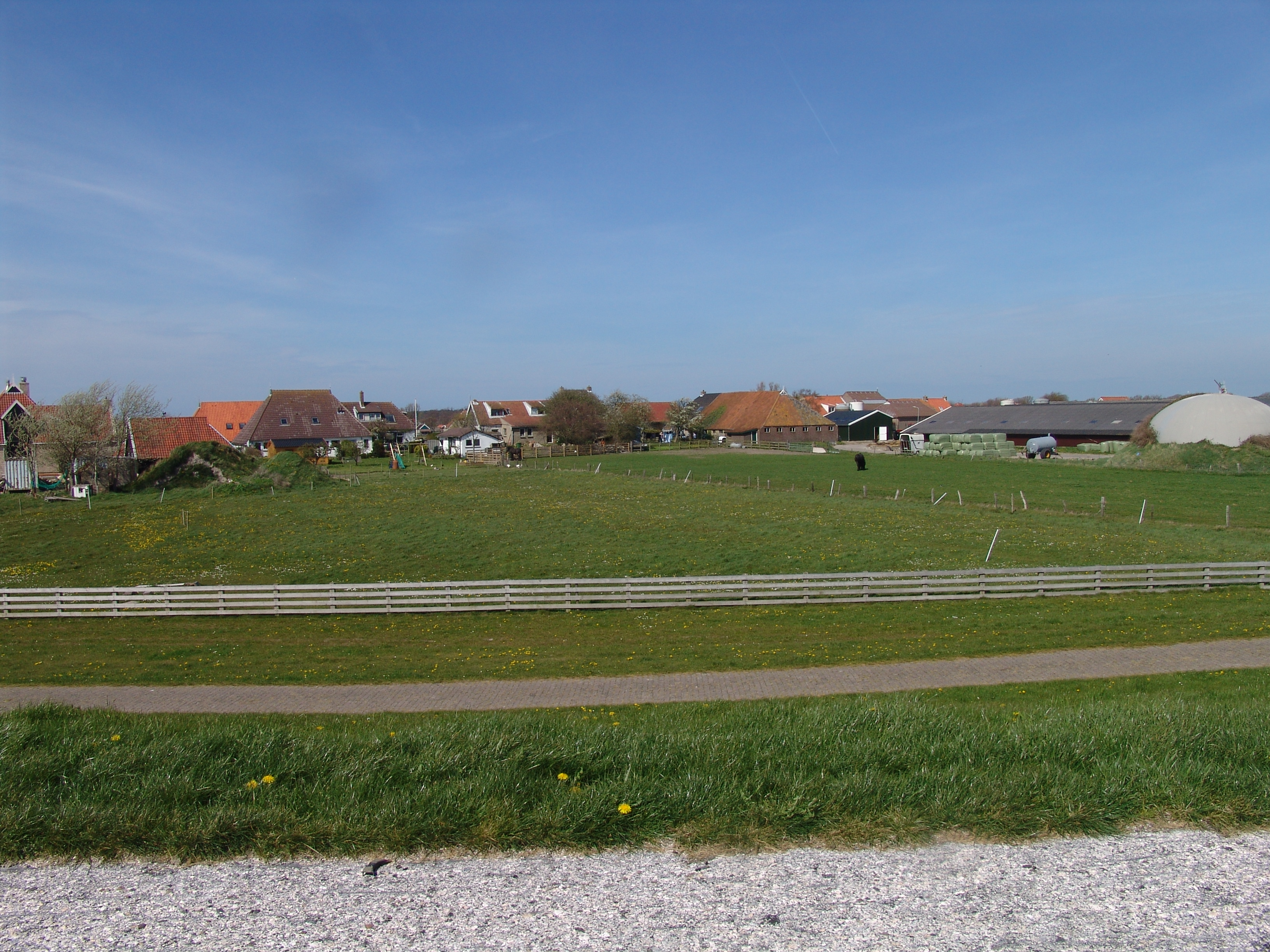
- Kinnum

- Location in the Netherlands
- Country: Netherlands
- Province: Friesland
- Municipality: Terschelling

Population (1 January 2017)
  - Total: 33
- Time zone: UTC+1 (CET)
  - Summer (DST): UTC+2 (CEST)
- Postal code: 8885
- Dialing code: 0562

Kinnum (West Frisian: Kinum) is a hamlet in the north of the Netherlands, on the Wadden Sea island of Terschelling, Friesland. It had a population of around 33 in January 2017.
