= Peperga =

- Village
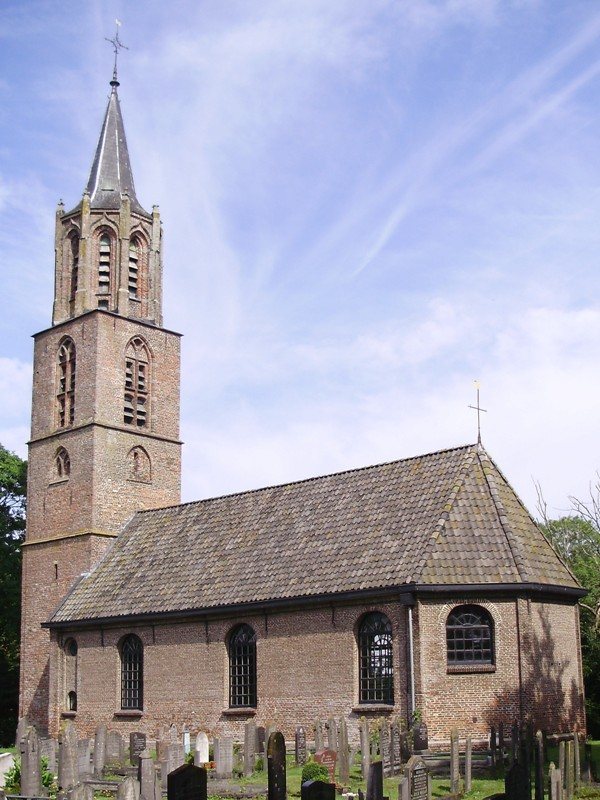
- Peperga Church

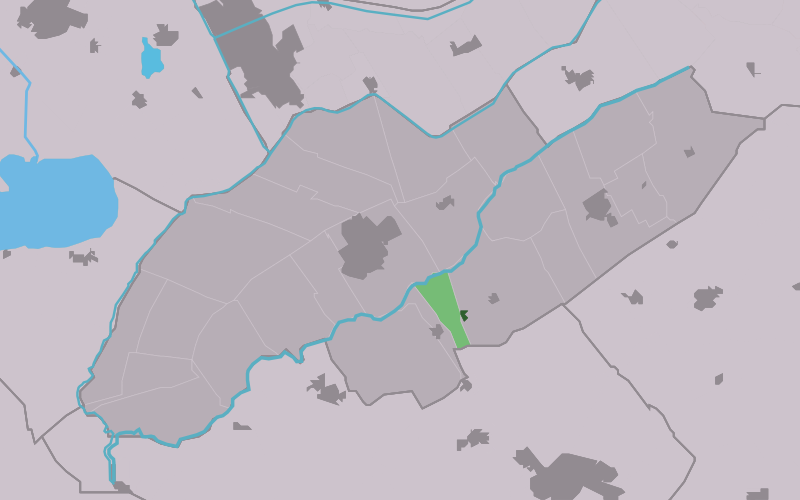
- Location within the municipality of Weststellingwerf

- Location in Netherlands Peperga (Netherlands)
- Coordinates: 52°51′0″N 6°3′23″E
- Country: Netherlands
- Province: Friesland
- Municipality: Weststellingwerf

Area
  - Total: 3.15 km^{2} (1.22 sq mi)
- Elevation: 3.2 m (10 ft)

Population (2021)
  - Total: 90
  - Density: 29/km^{2} (74/sq mi)
- Time zone: UTC+1 (CET)
  - Summer (DST): UTC+2 (CEST)
- Postal code: 8396
- Dialing code: 0561

Peperga (West Frisian: Pepergea) is a small village in Weststellingwerf in the province Friesland of the Netherlands. As of 2017, it has a population of 85 people, living in approximately 35 houses, and is characterized by detached houses, several businesses and a church. Peperga is located on the A32 between Wolvega and Steenwijk, with public transportation offering a service to the nearby villages of Steggerda and De Blesse.

Peperga is best known as the birthplace of Peter Stuyvesant, the last Director-General of the Dutch colony of New Netherland before the colony was taken by the English and subsequently renamed New York. The church, completed in 1810, was formerly dedicated to Saint Nicholas but is now named after Stuyvesant.

== History ==
The village originates in the Middle Ages and is listed as a parish in 1328; mention of it occurs in the seventeenth-century copy of a 1399 document as Pepergae (Pepergo is also found, in 1408 and 1510)—peper is a Frisian term for the boggy type of wetland on which the village was built. Peperga and nearby Blesdijke were burned by troops of Frederick of Blankenheim during war in 1413 at the time of the short-lived independence of the Stellingwerf area (comprising Weststellingwerf and Ooststellingwerf). The land was so wet that before 1660 the entire village, including the church, was moved one kilometer to a dryer area. It is found in the 1716 atlas by Bernardus Schotanus à Sterringa as a linear village with buildings exclusively on the north side of the road, except for a church on the south side, in the middle of the area. An 1850 atlas by Wopke Eekhoff shows that the village's meadows were dug up completely for peat. A provincial road in 1828 between Leeuwarden and Zwolle was the impetus for the formation of a new village west of Peperga, De Blesse. De Blesse, like nearby Blesdijke, derives its name from the little river Blesse, which separates Blesdijke from Peperga.

In 1865, the construction of a railway between Zwolle and Leeuwarden split the town in two: it separated Peperga from its west side, an area subsequently added to De Blesse. This division was boosted in the late eighties with the construction of a highway on the east side of the track. Peperga had its own railway station which opened in 1870 (with an adjoining cafe) as an expansion of an earlier home for railroad watchmen and closed on January 5, 1941. In the early seventies, the station was demolished. The nearby bridge over the river Linde is on the list of national state monuments as a Rijksmonument.

== Notable landmarks ==
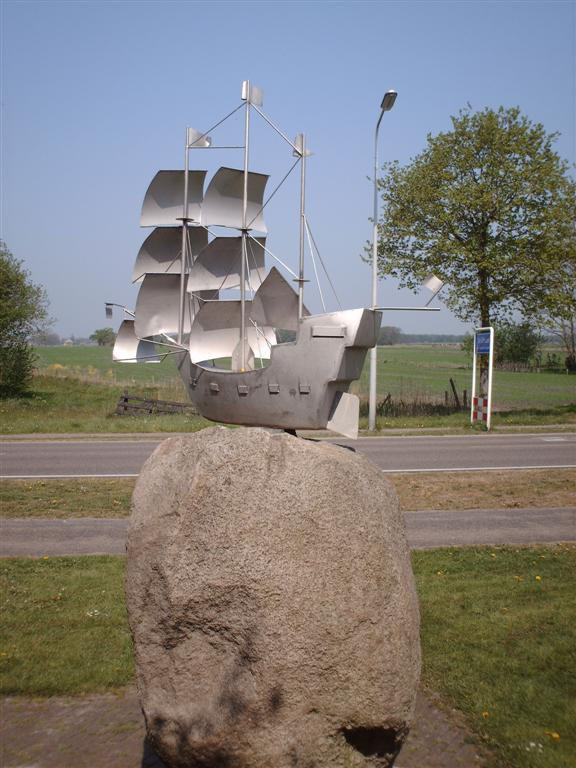
Peter Stuyvesant Monument

A medieval church had its "elegant" late-medieval tower expanded in 1537. Peter Stuyvesant's father Balthasar Stuyvesant was pastor of that (by then Dutch Reformed) church at the time of his son's birth in 1611 or 1612. Peter Stuyvesant was probably baptised there, though this cannot be proved since the parish register is missing. In 1810 a fire gutted the building and it was rebuilt. It was dedicated to Saint Nicholas until the church was closed for worship in autumn 2001 and sold. The church came into the hands of Folkert Munsterman, who wanted to convert it into a restaurant. This did not happen, and the church was sold again in 2007. The dysfunctional Van der Molen organ from 1912 was removed and replaced in 2007 by the 1903 from the Reformed Church of Woldendorp. The current owner has had the church renamed Peter Stuyvesant Kirke. The building is available for different purposes. The village also has a Dutch Reformed chapel, and a Roman Catholic church was built in 1837.

A monument in the village honors Stuyvesant. It consists of a model of a sailing ship on top of a glacial erratic.

== Demographics ==
- 1954 – 378
- 1959 – 370
- 1964 – 328
- 1969 – 286
- 1974 – 150
- 2004 – 60
- 2008 – 90
- 2012 – 87
- 2016 – 82
