= Munnekeburen =

- Village
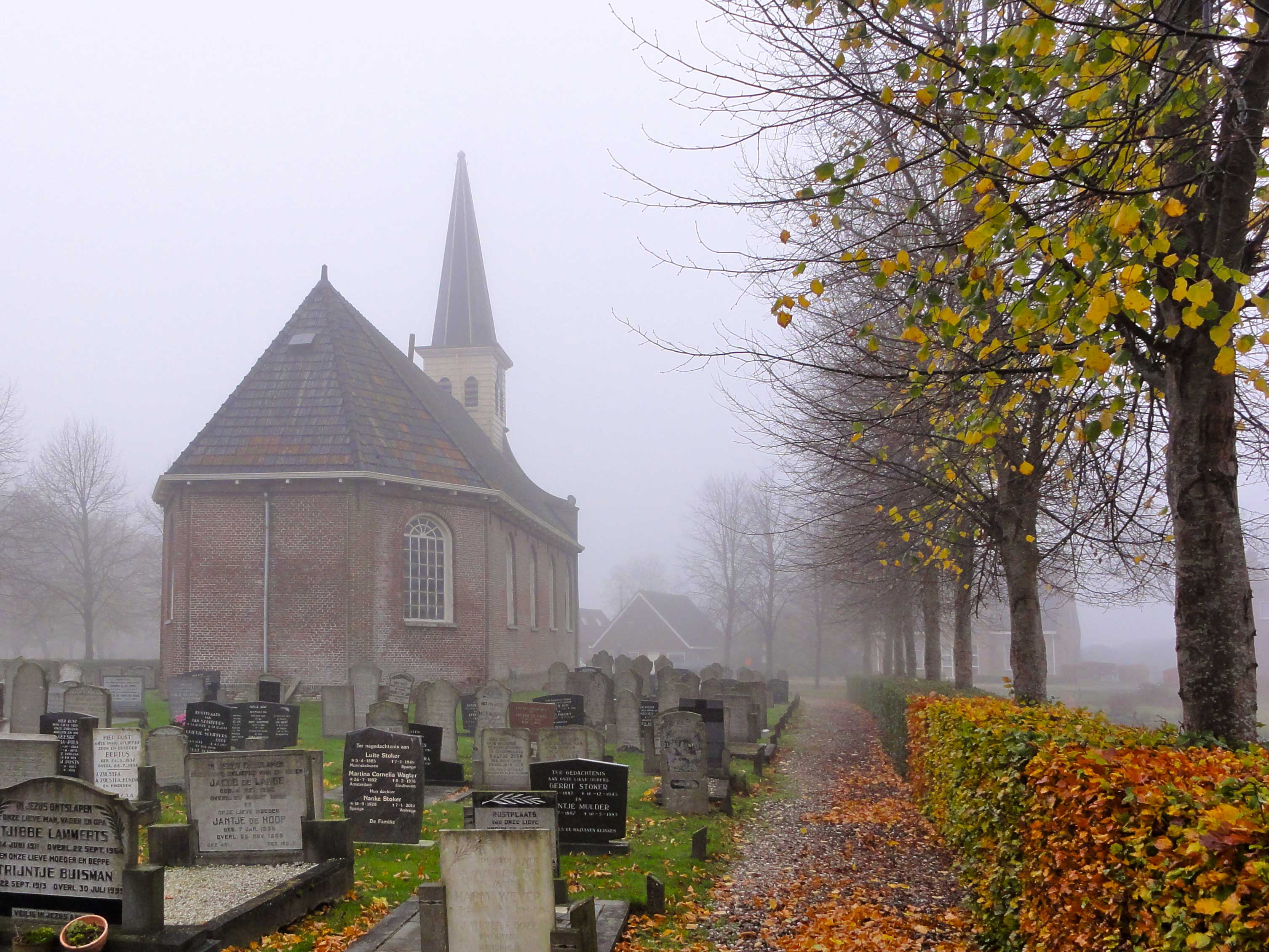
- Munnekeburen Church

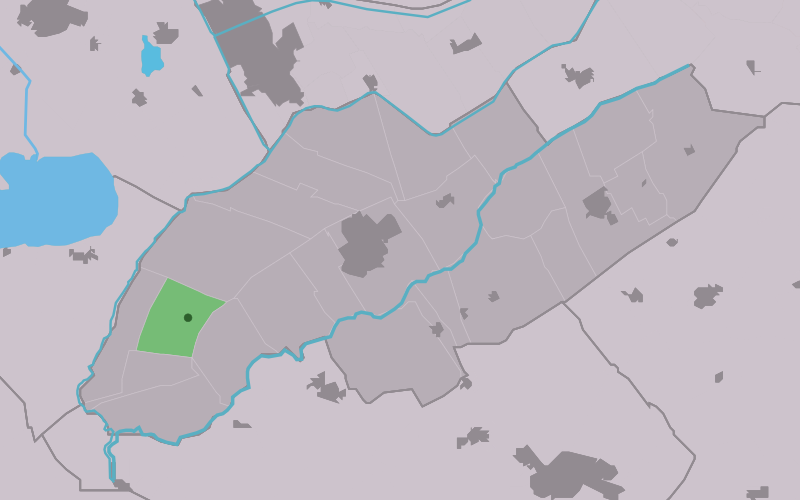
- Location in Weststellingwerf municipality

- Location in the Netherlands Munnekeburen (Netherlands)
- Country: Netherlands
- Province: Friesland
- Municipality: Weststellingwerf

Area
  - Total: 7.88 km^{2} (3.04 sq mi)
- Elevation: −0.3 m (−0.98 ft)

Population (2021)
  - Total: 455
  - Density: 57.7/km^{2} (150/sq mi)
- Time zone: UTC+1 (CET)
  - Summer (DST): UTC+2 (CEST)
- Postal code: 8485
- Dialing code: 0561

Munnekeburen (West Frisian: Munnikebuorren) is a village in Weststellingwerf in the province of Friesland, the Netherlands. It had a population of around 430 in 2017.

The village was first mentioned in 1243 as Monkeburen, and means monk neighbourhood. The monks were from the Saint Odulphus monastery in Stavoren. Munnekeburen started as peat excavation settlement along the Padsloot. The Dutch Reformed church was rebuilt in 1806. It was extensively modified in 1860.

Munnekeburen was home to 267 people in 1840, however that included a part of Langelille.
