= Scherpenzeel =

Scherpenzeel may refer to:

- Scherpenzeel, Gelderland, Dutch municipality and town
- Scherpenzeel, Friesland, Dutch village
- Ton Scherpenzeel (born 1952), Dutch musician
