= De Hoeve =

- Village
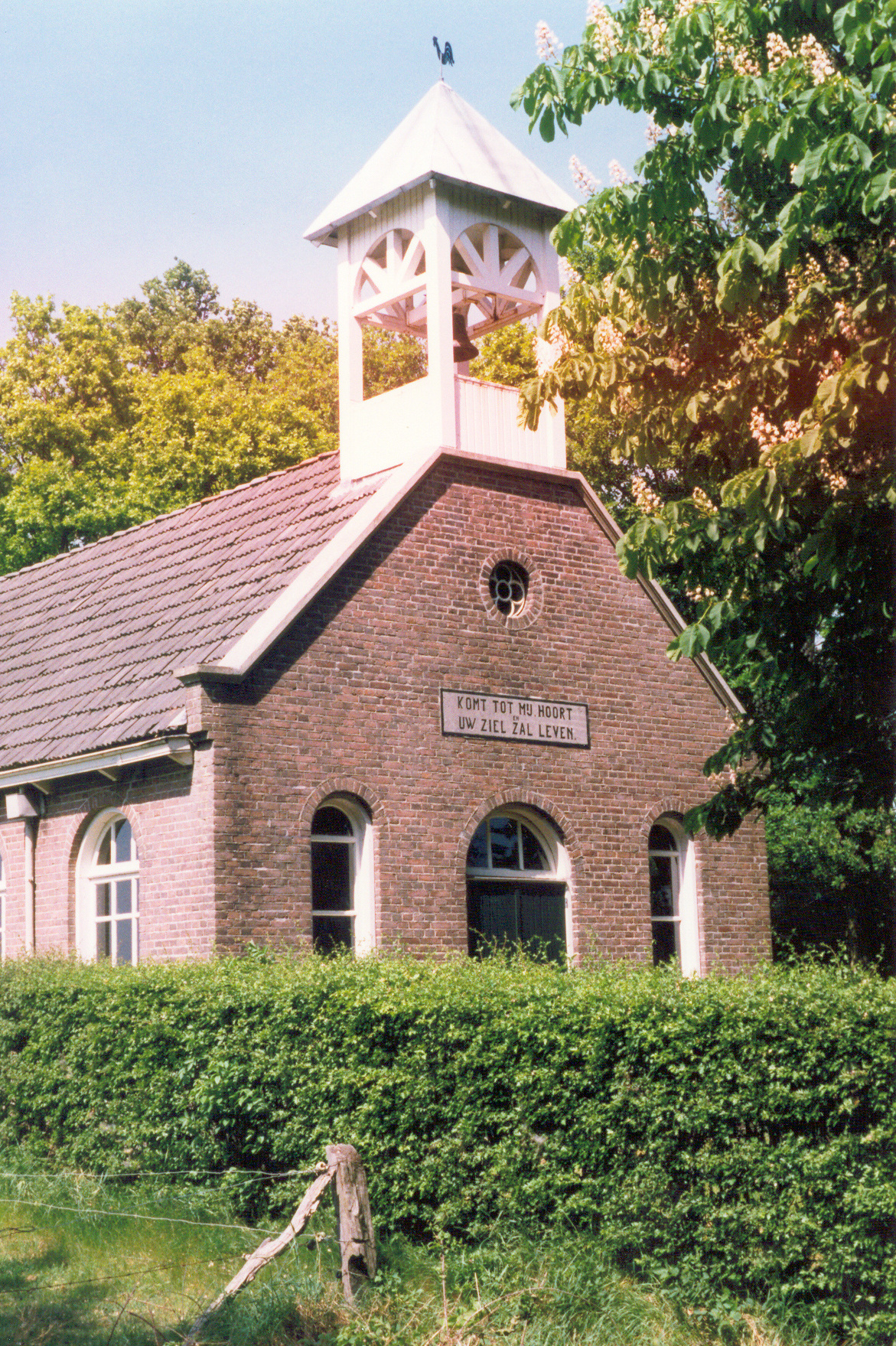
- De Hoeve Church

- Flag

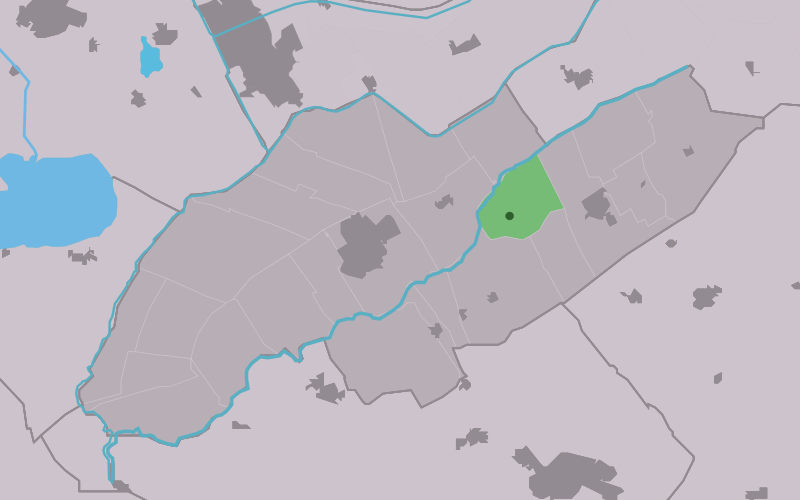
- Location in Weststellingwerf municipality

- Location in the Netherlands De Hoeve (Netherlands)
- Country: Netherlands
- Province: Friesland
- Municipality: Weststellingwerf

Area
  - Total: 7.64 km^{2} (2.95 sq mi)
- Elevation: 1.9 m (6.2 ft)

Population (2021)
  - Total: 385
  - Density: 50.4/km^{2} (131/sq mi)
- Time zone: UTC+1 (CET)
  - Summer (DST): UTC+2 (CEST)
- Postal code: 8394
- Dialing code: 0561

De Hoeve is a village in the Dutch municipality of Weststellingwerf in Friesland. It is located in an agriculture area between Wolvega and Noordwolde. De Hoeve has approximately 410 inhabitants (2017).

== History ==
De Hoeve is not a very old village. For the first time it was mentioned by its name in 1938. On a map of 1664 the territory was only heather. Shortly after that people built two farmhouses: an Oosterhoeve (East Hoeve) and a Westerhoeve (West Hoeve). A new map, drawn in 1718 shows both farmhouses. The area around it is also called Vinkegahoeve and Steggerdahoeve because they are in the neighbourhood of the small villages Vinkega and Steggerda.

In 1908 Commissie Plaatselijk Belang (Committee Local Interest) was founded. During the first meetings with the people it was decided to improve the dirtroads by putting rubble on it. Also they decide to make all kinds of other improvements. These meetings were also used as entertainment with recitals, songs and hot chocolate, made of the milk that was donated by the farmers. The committeemembers made sure that there would be enough milk left for the pupils the next day.

== Famous inhabitants ==
An important person for De Hoeve was Albert H. Kuipers. He was a farmer, and owner of moor and the founder of the first school in De Hoeve. On behalf of 68 people he wrote a request to the province. He himself donated the land necessary to build the school. The county of Weststellingwerf did not agree with the plan of building a school. They were afraid that less pupils would go to the newly built school in Steggerda. Also finances were a big problem. The province of Friesland knew that this school had to be built. At that moment 70 pupils between 5 and 12 years old had to walk more than 3 to 5 hours to school through the mud and dirt.

== Present day ==
In 2005 there are several clubs and committees in De Hoeve. The school has a new name now. It is called "De Klaeter". De Klaeter is doing very well with its approximately 55 pupils. De Hoeve has its own monthly newspaper called "De OosterWester".

== Gallery ==
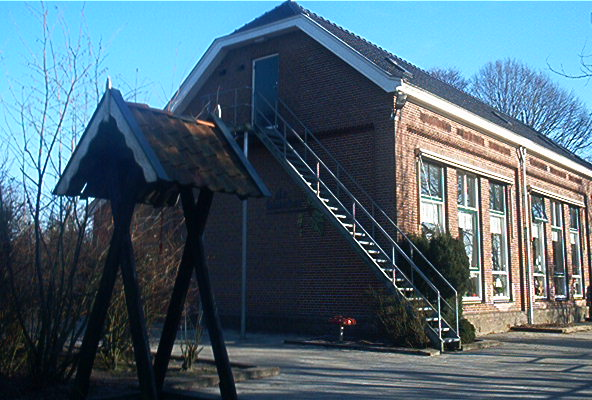
School

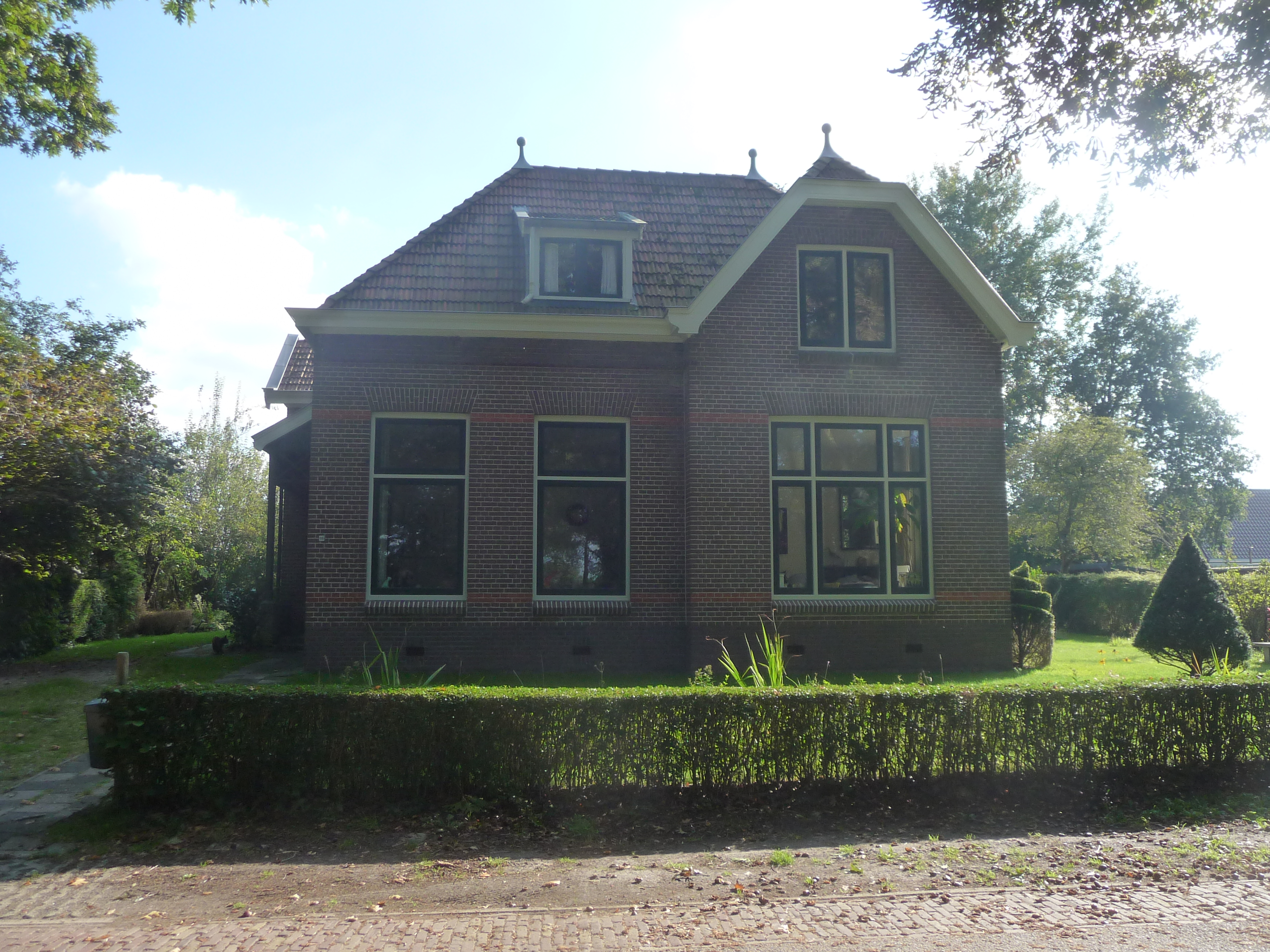
House in De Hoeve
