= Oosterstreek =

- Village
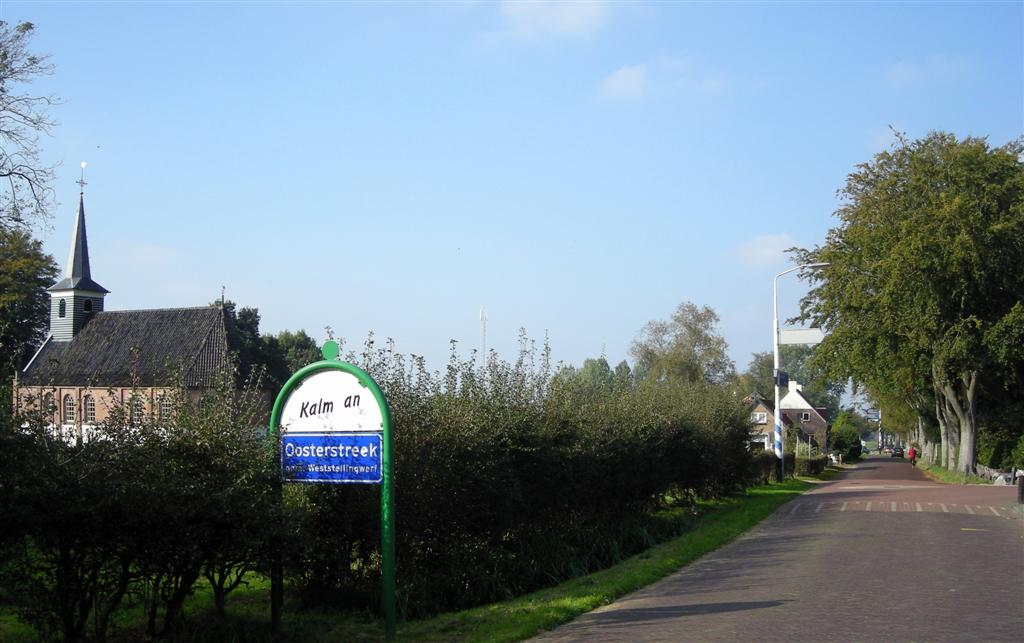

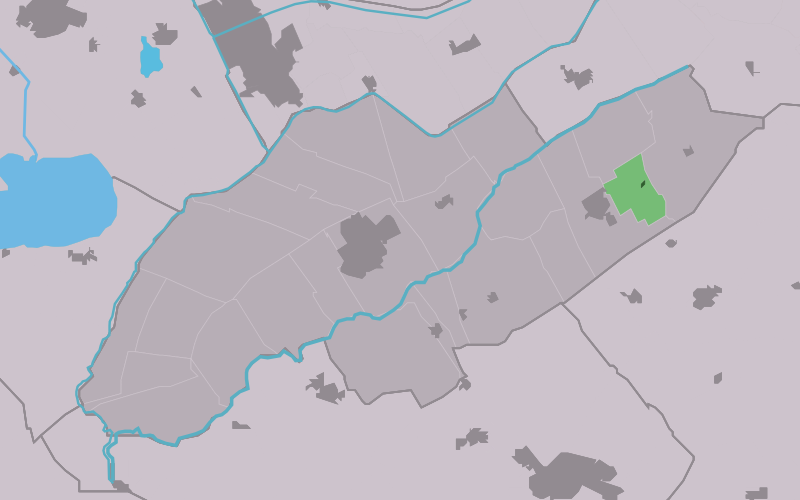
- Location in Weststellingwerf municipality

- Location in the Netherlands Oosterstreek (Netherlands)
- Country: Netherlands
- Province: Friesland
- Municipality: Weststellingwerf

Area
  - Total: 4.47 km^{2} (1.73 sq mi)
- Elevation: 5 m (16 ft)

Population (2021)
  - Total: 545
  - Density: 122/km^{2} (316/sq mi)
- Time zone: UTC+1 (CET)
  - Summer (DST): UTC+2 (CEST)
- Postal code: 8388
- Dialing code: 0561

Oosterstreek (West Frisian: Easterstreek) is a small village in Weststellingwerf in the province of Friesland, the Netherlands. It had a population of around 535 in 2017.

The village was first mentioned in 1974 as Oosterstreek, and is a new name for the linear settlement along the Noordwolde to Boijl road, however it was first used around 1930 by the local football club. It means "eastern region" (as viewed from Noordwolde). The area around Oosterstreek was a peat excavation region, and nowadays mainly consists of heath.
