= Nijeholtwolde =

- Village
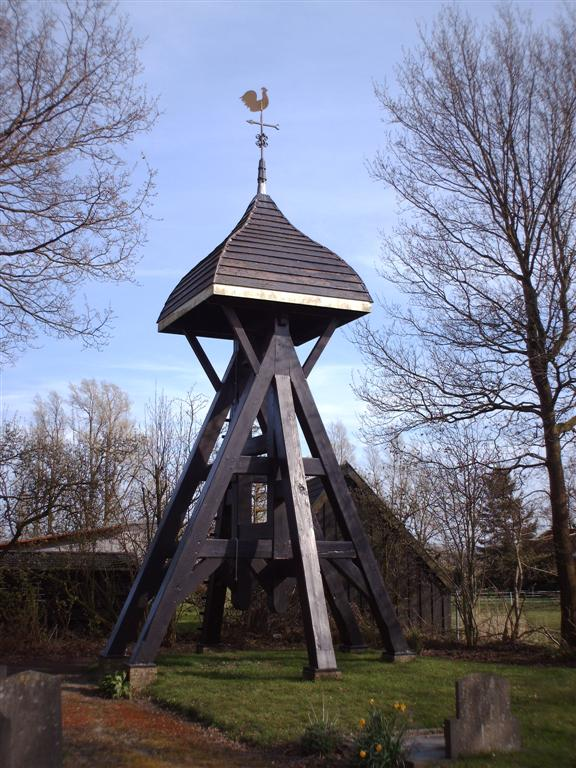

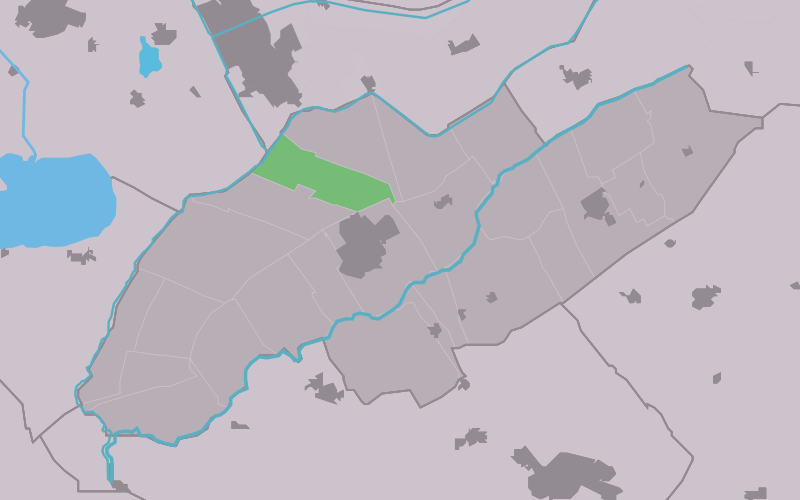
- Location in Weststellingwerf municipality

- Location in the Netherlands Nijeholtwolde (Netherlands)
- Country: Netherlands
- Province: Friesland
- Municipality: Weststellingwerf

Area
  - Total: 8.47 km^{2} (3.27 sq mi)
- Elevation: 0.5 m (1.6 ft)

Population (2021)
  - Total: 190
  - Density: 22/km^{2} (58/sq mi)
- Time zone: UTC+1 (CET)
  - Summer (DST): UTC+2 (CEST)
- Postal code: 8488
- Dialing code: 0561

Nijeholtwolde (West Frisian: Nijeholtwâlde) is a village in Weststellingwerf in the province of Friesland, the Netherlands. It had a population of around 183 in 2017.

The village was first mentioned in 1320 as Nieholtwolt, and means "new low-lying wood". Nije (new) has been added to distinguish from Oldeholtwolde. The church of Nijeholtwolde was demolished around 1700. There were no funds to rebuild it, and a bell tower was constructed instead. The tower has been restored in 1982.

In 1840, Nijeholtwolde was home to 225 people.
