= Zandhuizen =

- Village
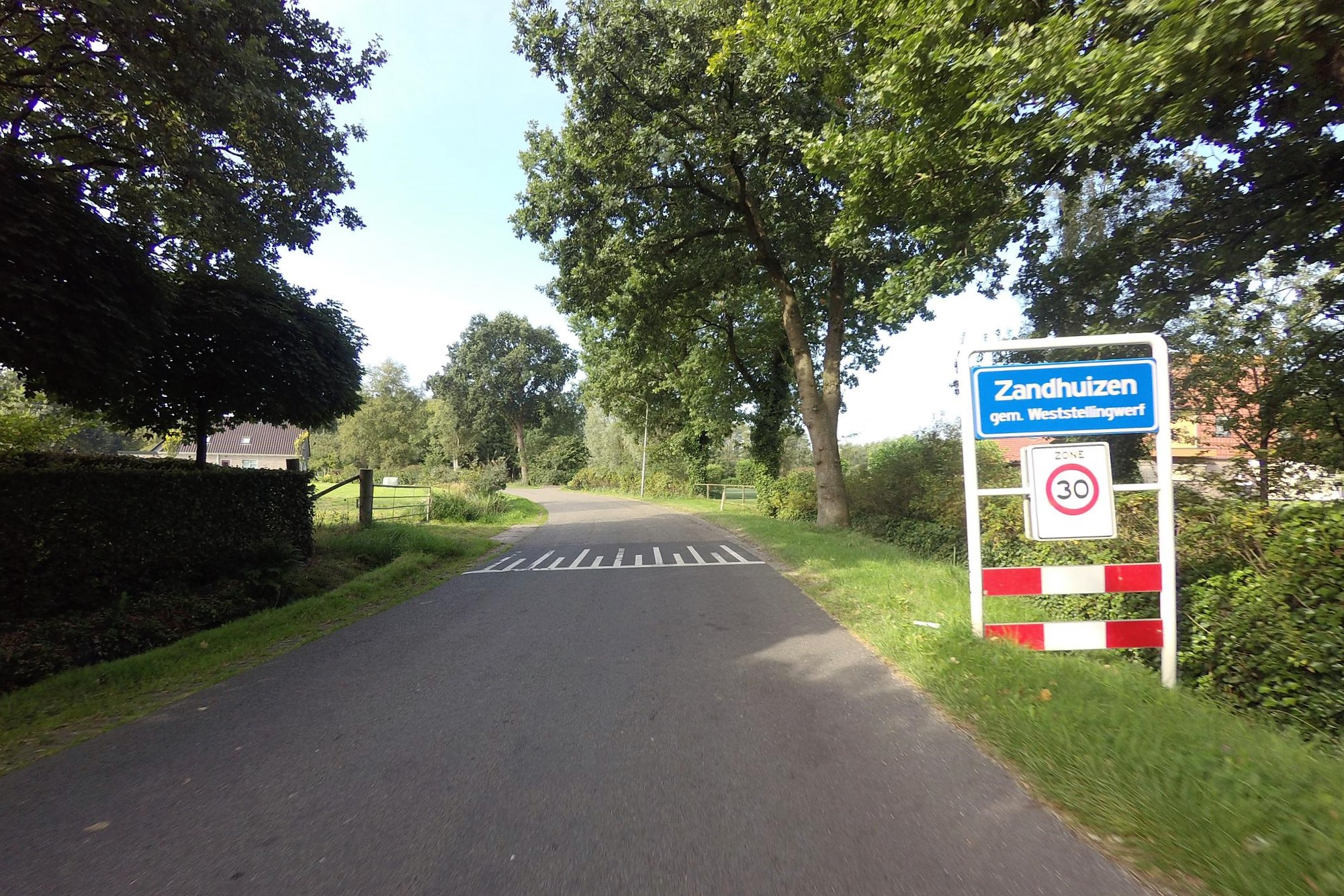

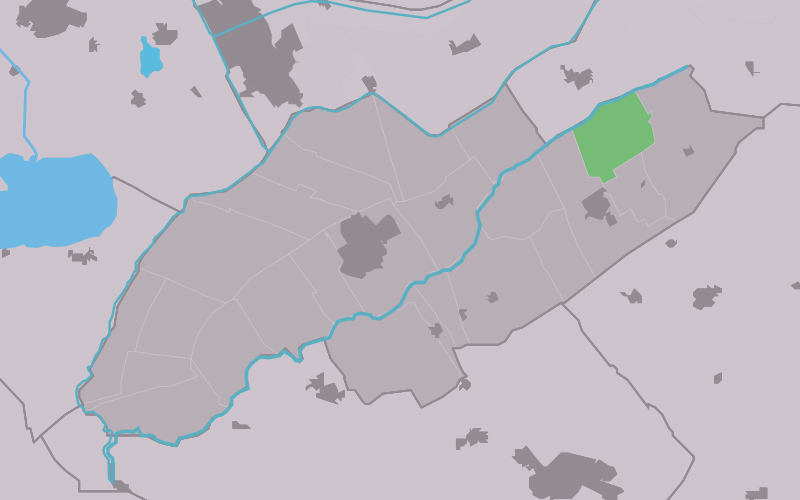
- Location in Weststellingwerf municipality

- Location in the Netherlands Zandhuizen (Netherlands)
- Country: Netherlands
- Province: Friesland
- Municipality: Weststellingwerf

Area
  - Total: 7.92 km^{2} (3.06 sq mi)
- Elevation: 5 m (16 ft)

Population (2021)
  - Total: 335
  - Density: 42.3/km^{2} (110/sq mi)
- Time zone: UTC+1 (CET)
  - Summer (DST): UTC+2 (CEST)
- Postal code: 8389
- Dialing code: 0561

Zandhuizen (West Frisian: Sânhuzen) is a village in Weststellingwerf in the province of Friesland, the Netherlands. It had a population of around 310 in 2017.

The village was first mentioned in 1543 as Santhuesen, and means sand houses. Zandhuizen was probably founded as an outpost of the monastery Rinsumageest in the 11th century.

Zandhuizen was home to 67 people in 1840.
