= Ter Idzard =

- Village
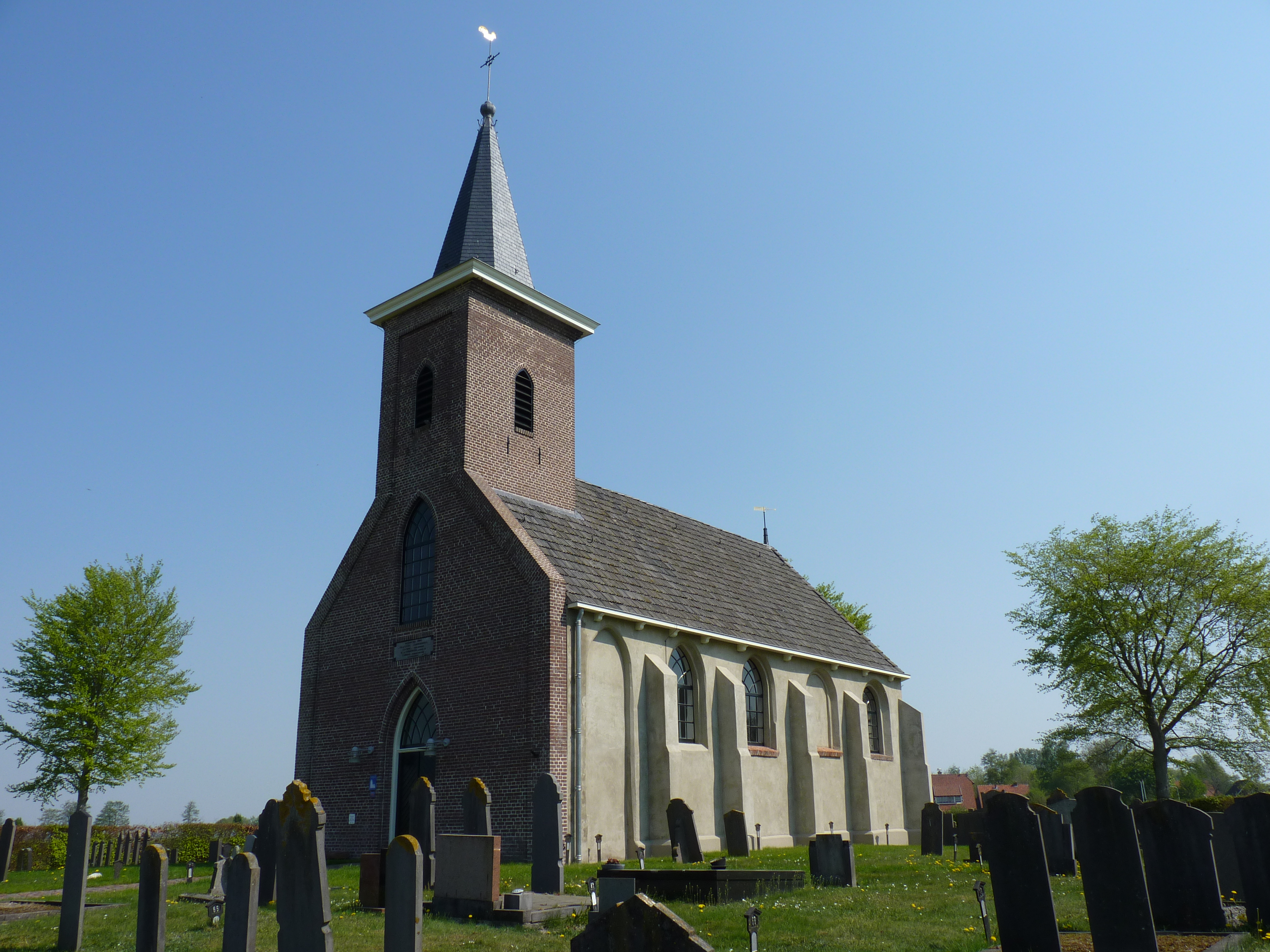
- Boniface Church

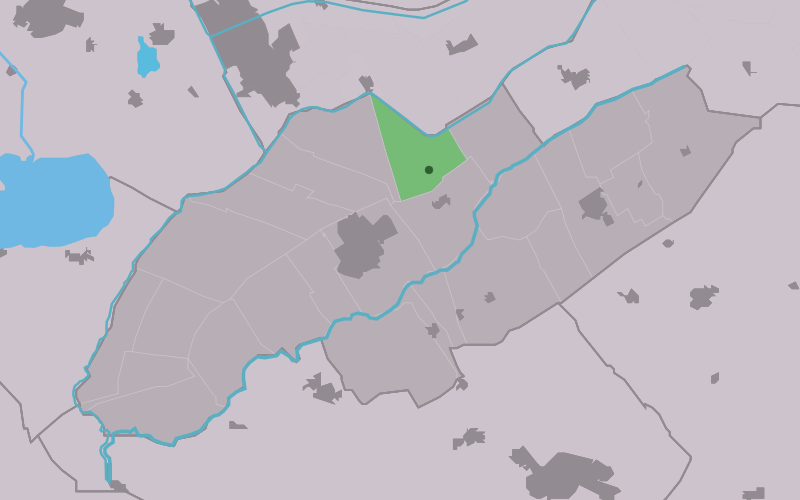
- Location in Weststellingwerf municipality

- Location in the Netherlands Ter Idzard (Netherlands)
- Country: Netherlands
- Province: Friesland
- Municipality: Weststellingwerf

Area
  - Total: 8.42 km^{2} (3.25 sq mi)
- Elevation: 0.2 m (0.66 ft)

Population (2021)
  - Total: 320
  - Density: 38/km^{2} (98/sq mi)
- Time zone: UTC+1 (CET)
  - Summer (DST): UTC+2 (CEST)
- Postal code: 8476
- Dialing code: 0561

Ter Idzard (West Frisian: Teridzert) is a village in Weststellingwerf in the province of Friesland, the Netherlands. It had a population of around 310 in 2017.

The village was first mentioned in 1320 as Ydzerde, and means "settlement of Idzerd (person)". The Roman Catholic church dates from 1903 and has a spire from 1926, however the village probably had a church around 1100.

The Idzerda Stins was a stins (estate) in the village owned by the Idzerda family. It already existed around 1500. Meinte Idzerda was grietman (a combination of mayor and judge) of Weststellingwerf between 1600 and 1619. The estate was demolished in 1740 and replaced by a farm.

Ter Idzard was home to 446 people in 1840.
