= Spanga =

- Village
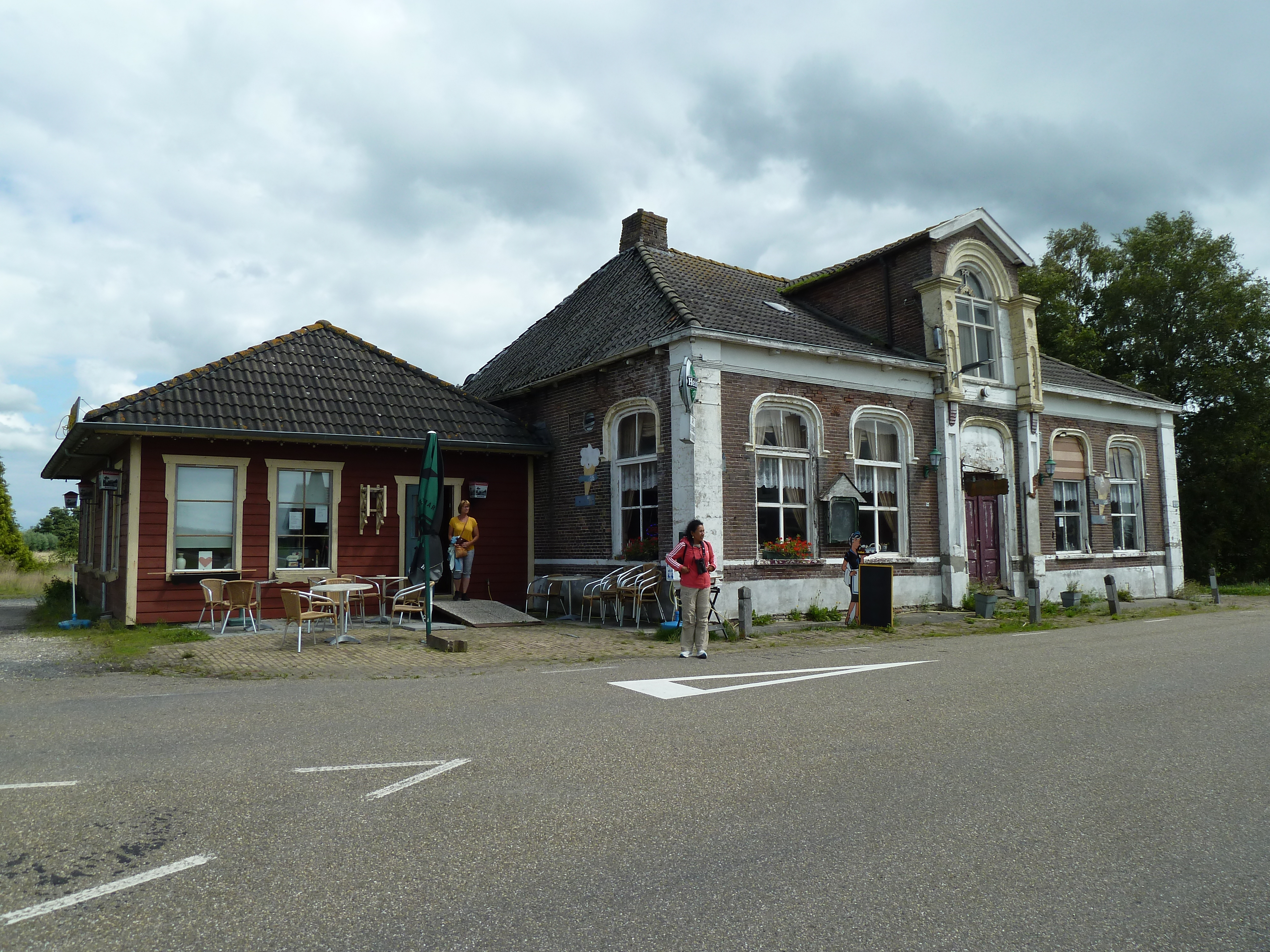
- Inn De Veehandel

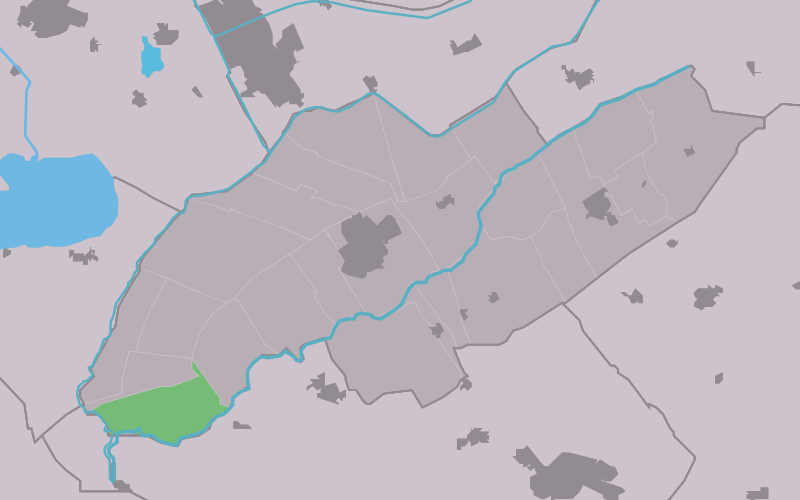
- Location in Weststellingwerf municipality

- Location in the Netherlands Spanga (Netherlands)
- Country: Netherlands
- Province: Friesland
- Municipality: Weststellingwerf

Area
  - Total: 10.05 km^{2} (3.88 sq mi)
- Elevation: −0.6 m (−2.0 ft)

Population (2021)
  - Total: 235
  - Density: 23.4/km^{2} (60.6/sq mi)
- Time zone: UTC+1 (CET)
  - Summer (DST): UTC+2 (CEST)
- Postal code: 8482
- Dialing code: 0561

Spanga (West Frisian: Spangea) is a village in Weststellingwerf in the province of Friesland, the Netherlands. It had a population of around 210 in 2017.

The village was first mentioned in 1320 as Spangghe. The etymology is unclear. The Dutch Reformed church was demolished in 1831. In 1851, a bell tower was erected as its replacement. The tower was destroyed during a storm in 1954, and a new tower was built in 1955 which was replaced in 1989.

Spanga was home to 121 people in 1840.

== Gallery ==
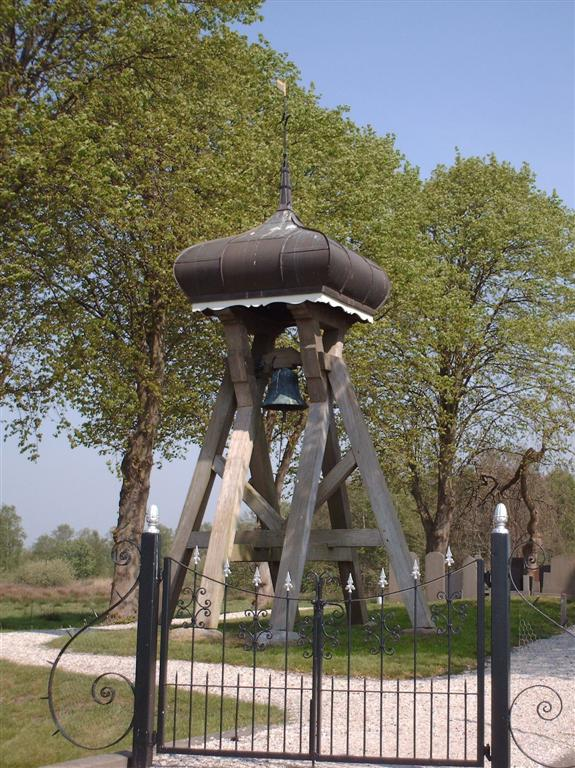
Spanga Bell Tower
