= Weststellingwerf =

Weststellingwerf Weststellingwarf (Stellingwerfs)
- Municipality
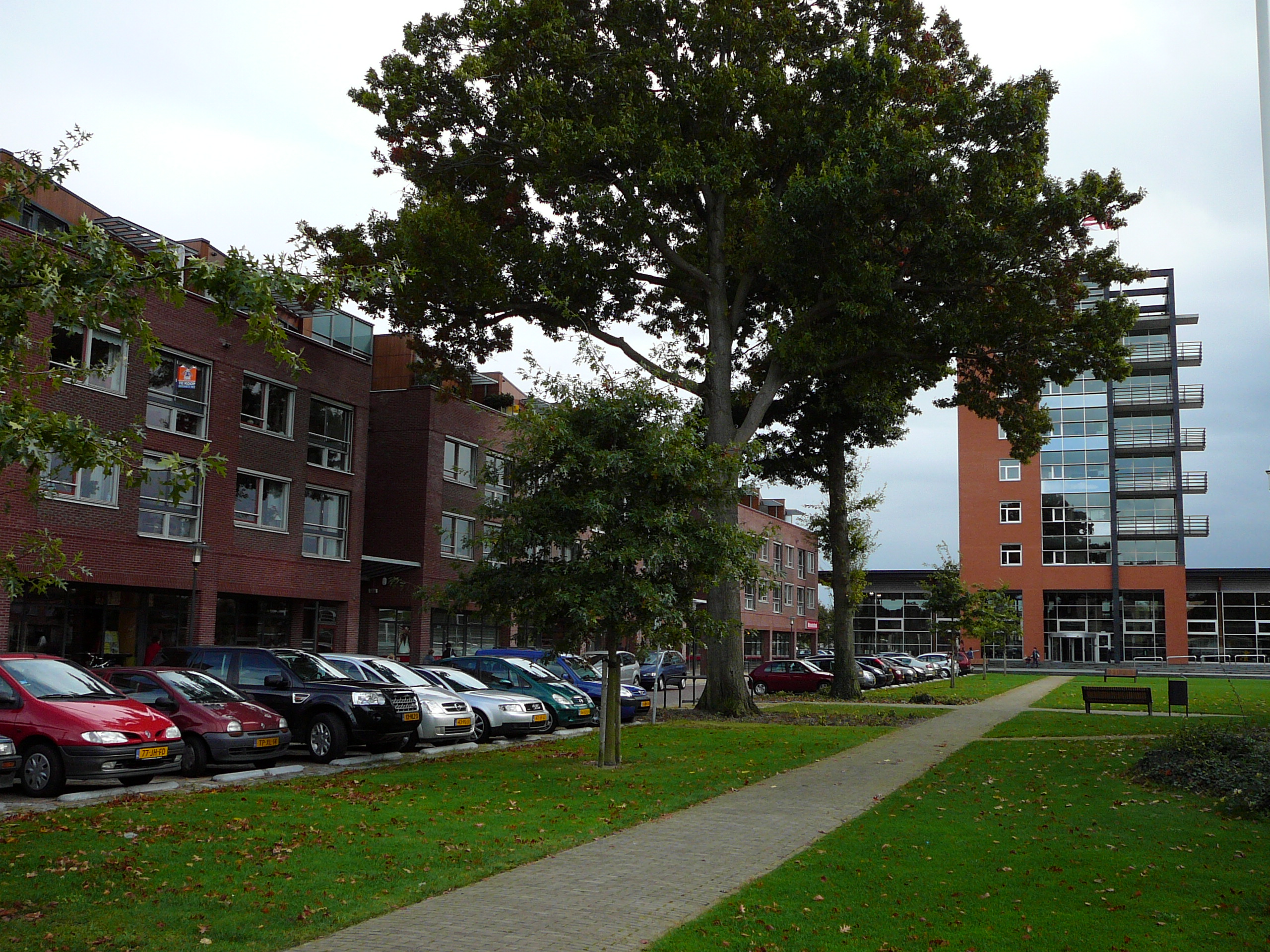
- Weststellingwerf town hall in Wolvega

- Flag Coat of arms

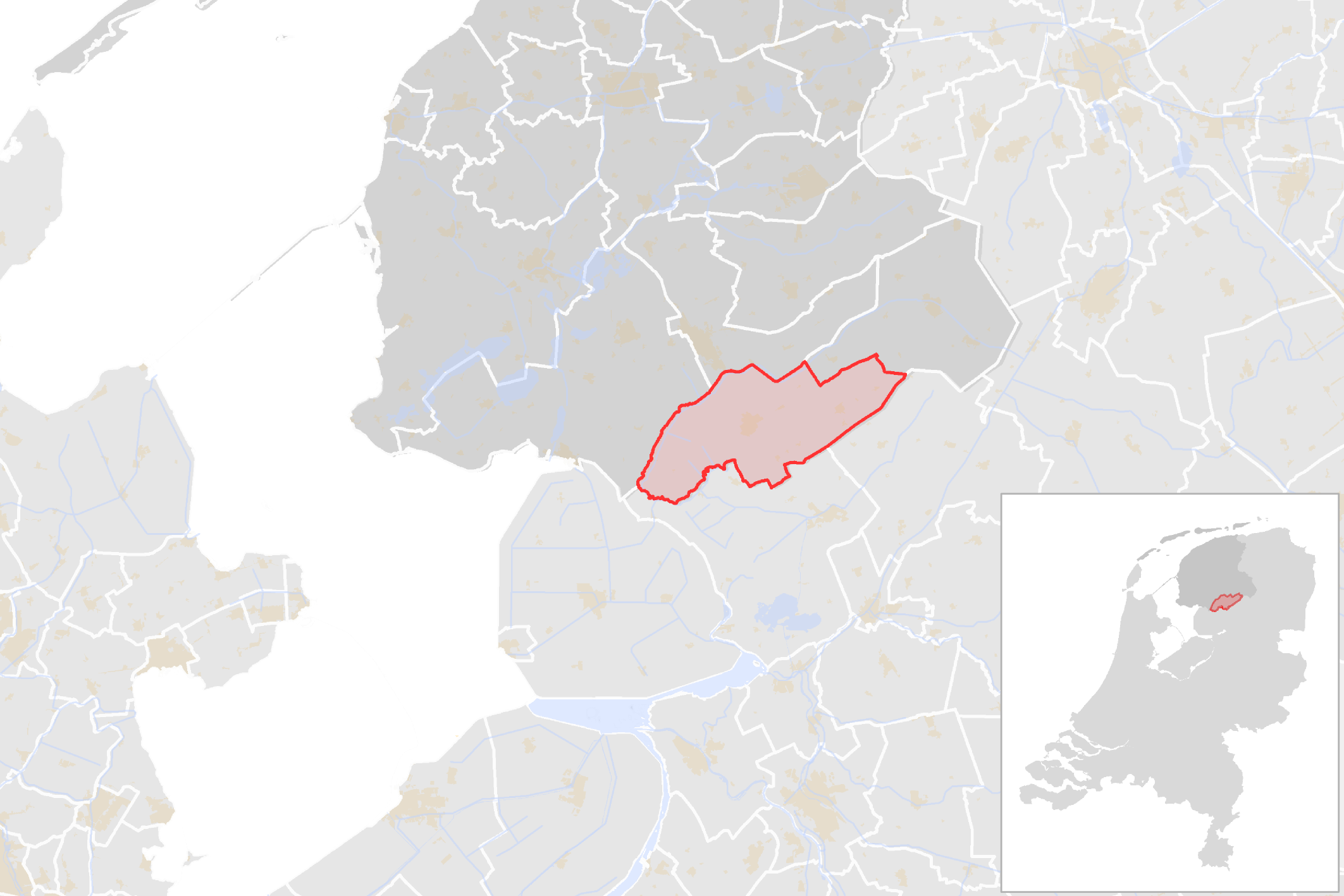
- Location in Friesland
- Coordinates: 52°53′N 6°0′E
- Country: Netherlands
- Province: Friesland

Government
  - Body: Municipal council
  - Mayor: Stieneke van der Graaf (CU, acting)

Area
  - Total: 228.45 km^{2} (88.21 sq mi)
  - Land: 220.30 km^{2} (85.06 sq mi)
  - Water: 8.15 km^{2} (3.15 sq mi)
- Elevation: 2 m (6.6 ft)

Population (January 2021)
  - Total: 26,130
  - Density: 119/km^{2} (310/sq mi)
- Time zone: UTC+1 (CET)
  - Summer (DST): UTC+2 (CEST)
- Postcode: 8388–8398, 8470–8489
- Area code: 0527, 0561
- Website: www.weststellingwerf.nl

Weststellingwerf (Dutch: [ˈʋɛststɛlɪŋˌʋɛr(ə)f]; Stellingwarfs: Weststellingwarf or Stellingwarf-Westaende) is a municipality in the province of Friesland in the northern Netherlands. It borders both Drenthe and Overijssel. It is one of the municipalities of Friesland where the spoken language is not West Frisian; instead, Stellingwerfs, a dialect of Dutch Low Saxon, is spoken here.

== Population centres ==
- Blesdijke
- Boijl
- De Blesse
- De Hoeve
- Langelille
- Munnekeburen
- Nijeholtpade
- Nijeholtwolde
- Nijelamer
- Nijetrijne
- Noordwolde
- Oldeholtpade
- Oldeholtwolde
- Oldelamer
- Oldetrijne
- Oosterstreek
- Peperga
- Scherpenzeel
- Slijkenburg
- Sonnega
- Spanga
- Steggerda
- Ter Idzard
- Vinkega
- Wolvega
- Zandhuizen

A small part of the village Willemsoord lays within Weststellingwerf and Noordwolde-Zuid is also mainly named as a village, but stated by municipality as a hamlet.

The other hamlets are: Boekelte, Gracht, Munnekezeel, Overburen, Rijsberkampen, Rode Dorp, Schoterzijl (partially) and Zuid (partially).

=== Topography ===
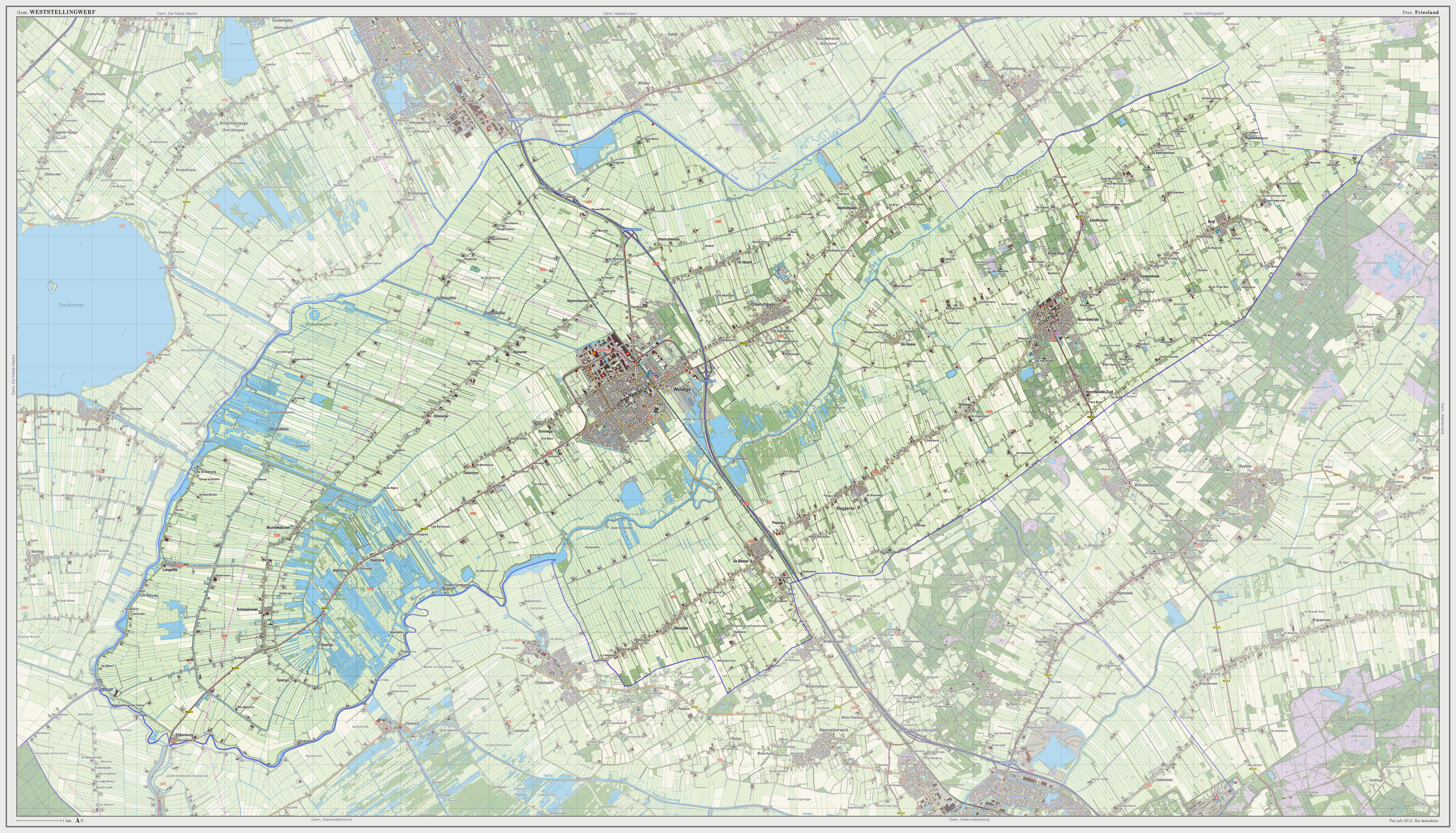

=== Administrative centre ===
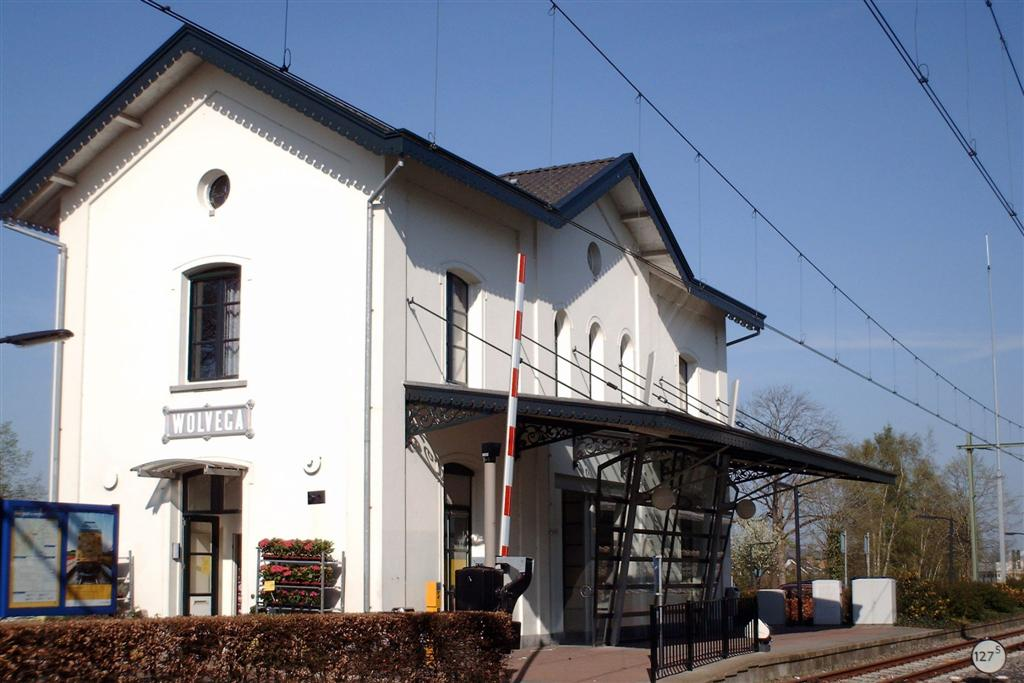
Station Wolvega

Wolvega is the administrative centre of Weststellingwerf, where the town hall is situated.

== Transport ==
Weststellingwerf is served by Wolvega railway station.

== Notable people ==
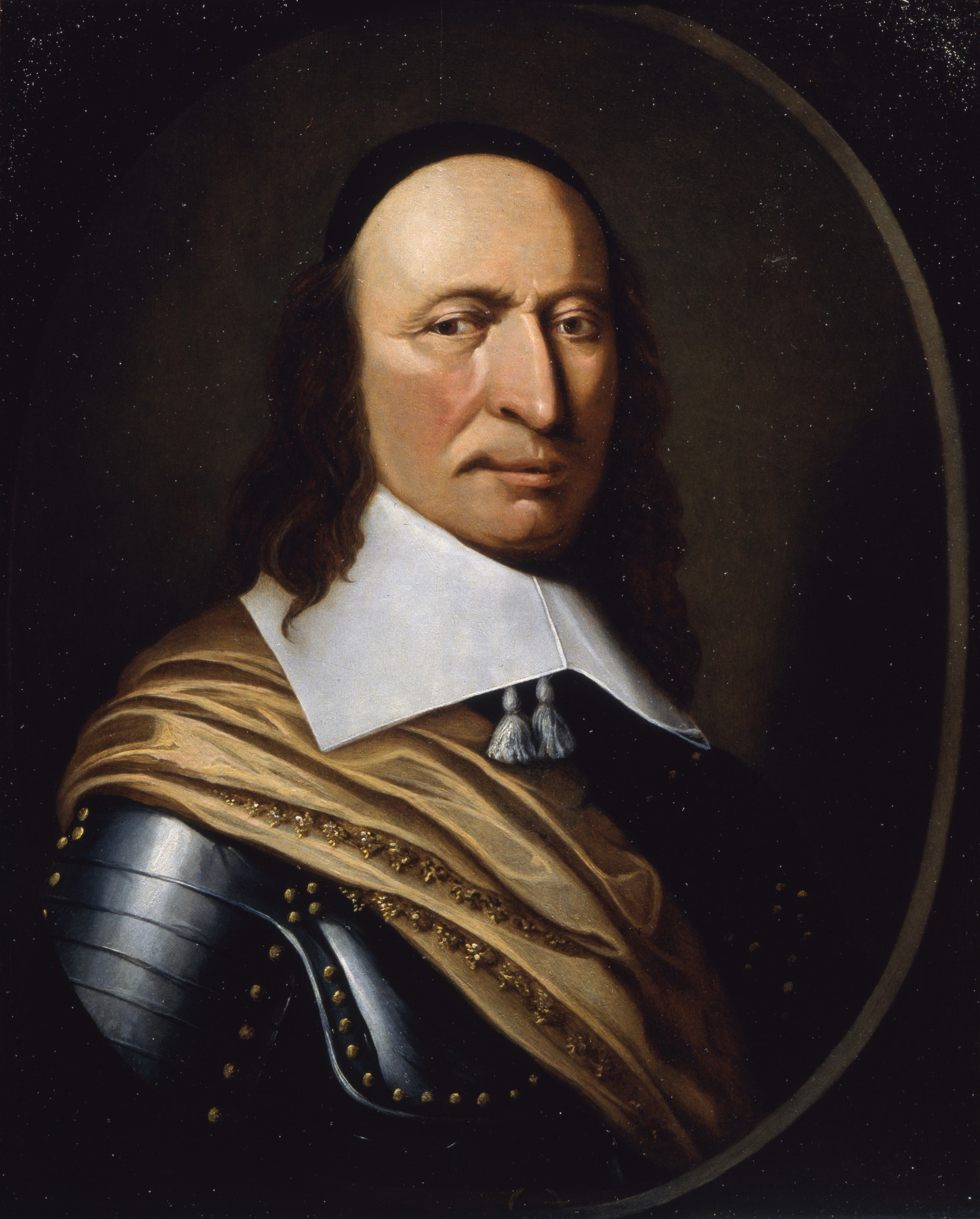
Peter Stuyvesant, 1660

- Peter Stuyvesant (1592–1672) last governor of New Amsterdam
- Johan Eilerts de Haan (1865-1910) Dutch explorer and soldier
- Johan van Minnen (1932–2016) journalist and politician.
- Johan Veenstra (born 1946) an author, poet and columnist
- Sijtje van der Lende (born 1950) former speed skater, competed at the 1976 and 1980 Winter Olympics
- Gerard van Klaveren (born 1951) politician, Mayor of Weststellingwerf 2005-2017
- Monique Knol (born 1964) former racing cyclist, won gold and bronze medals in two consecutive Summer Olympics

== Gallery ==
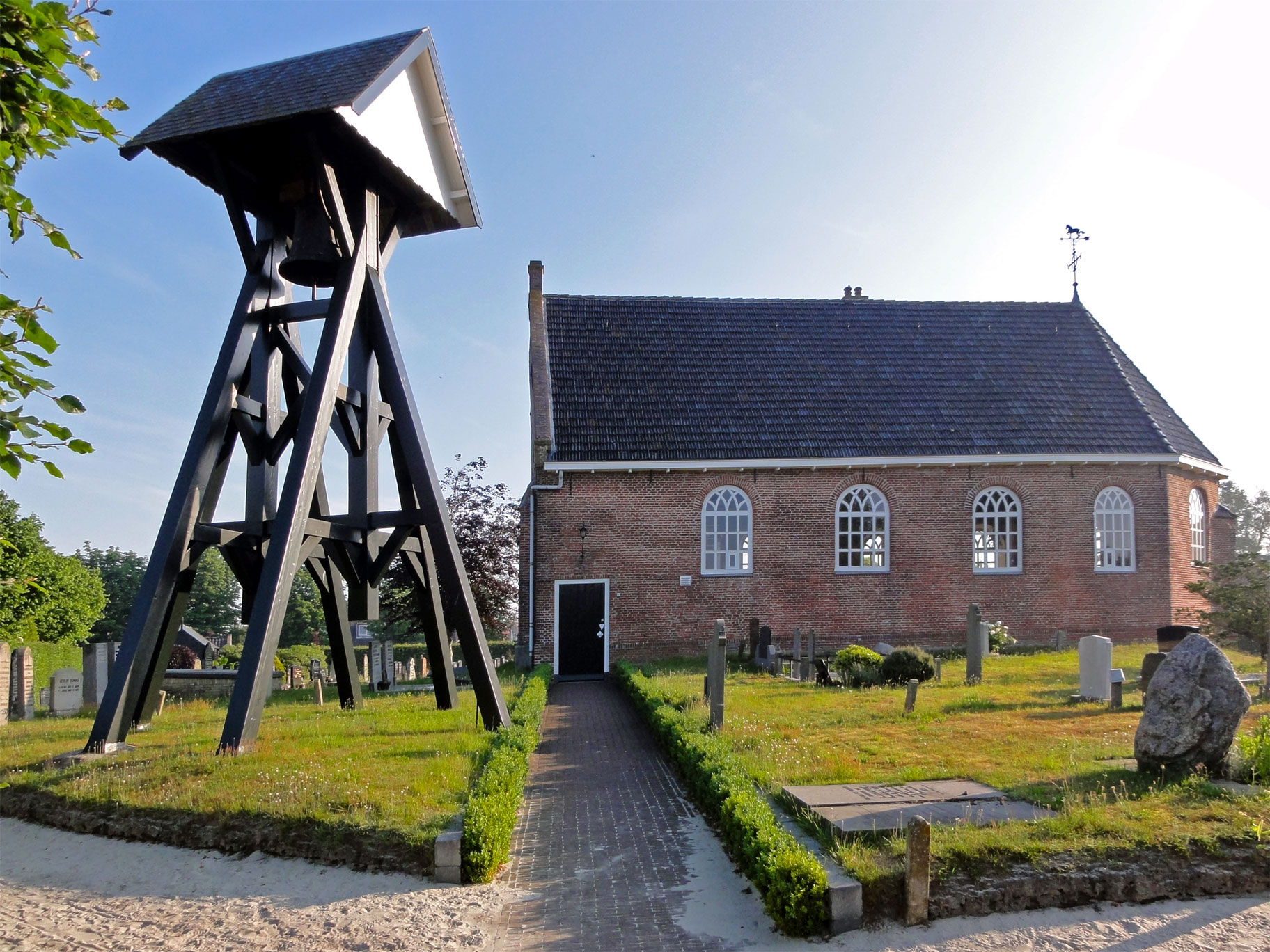
Kerk Boijl

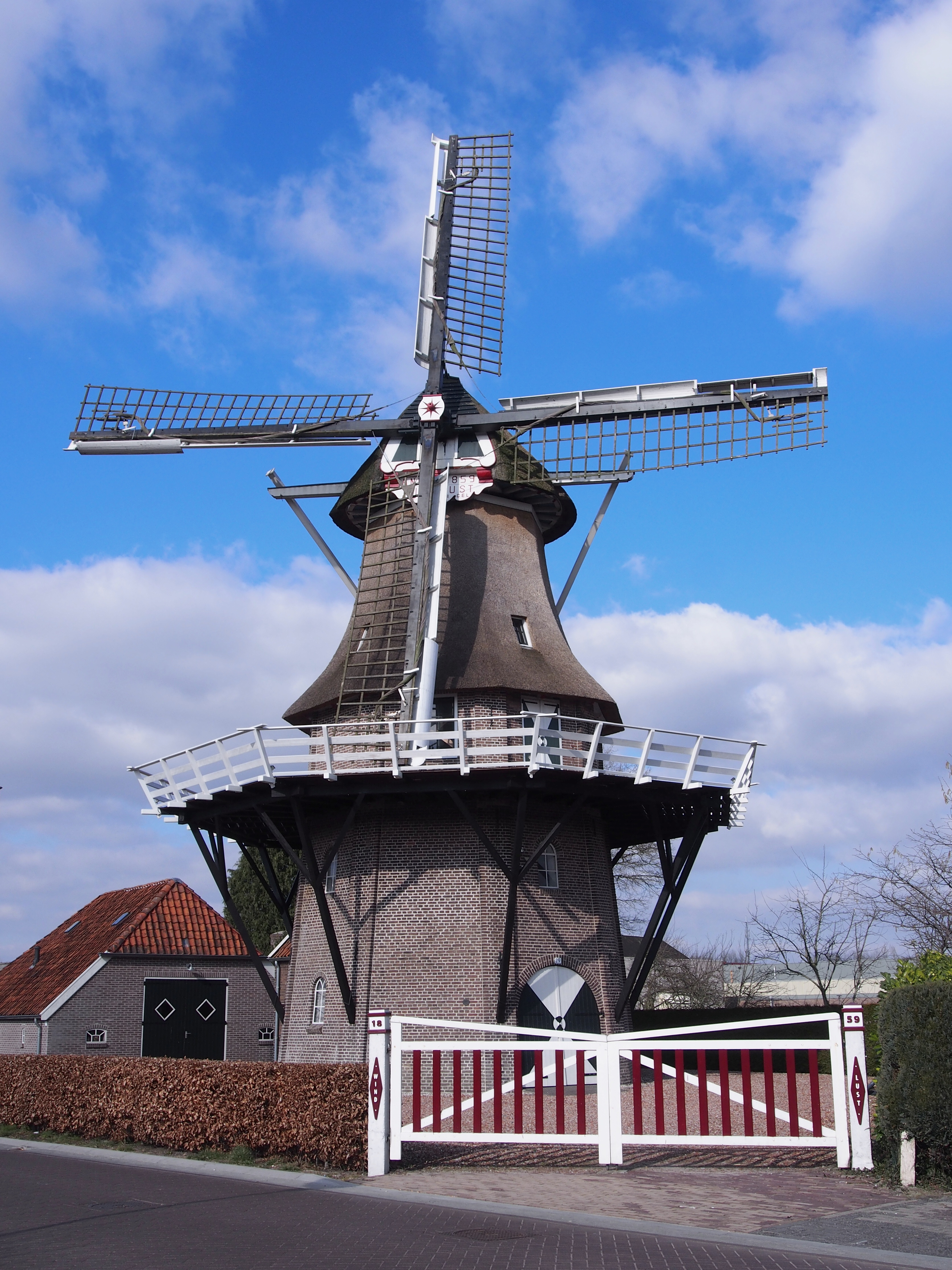
Molen Windlust in Noordwolde

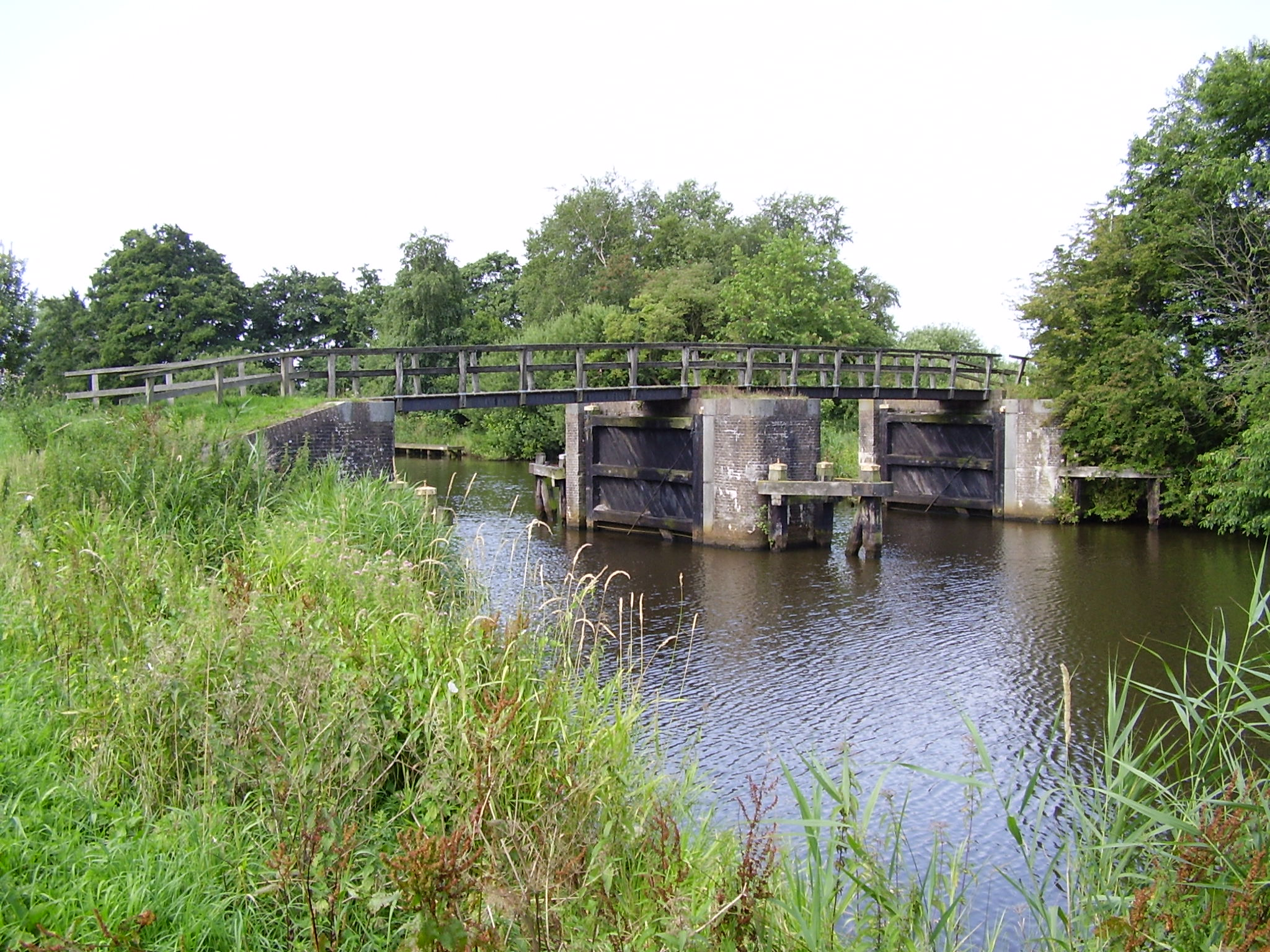
Keersluis in de Linde

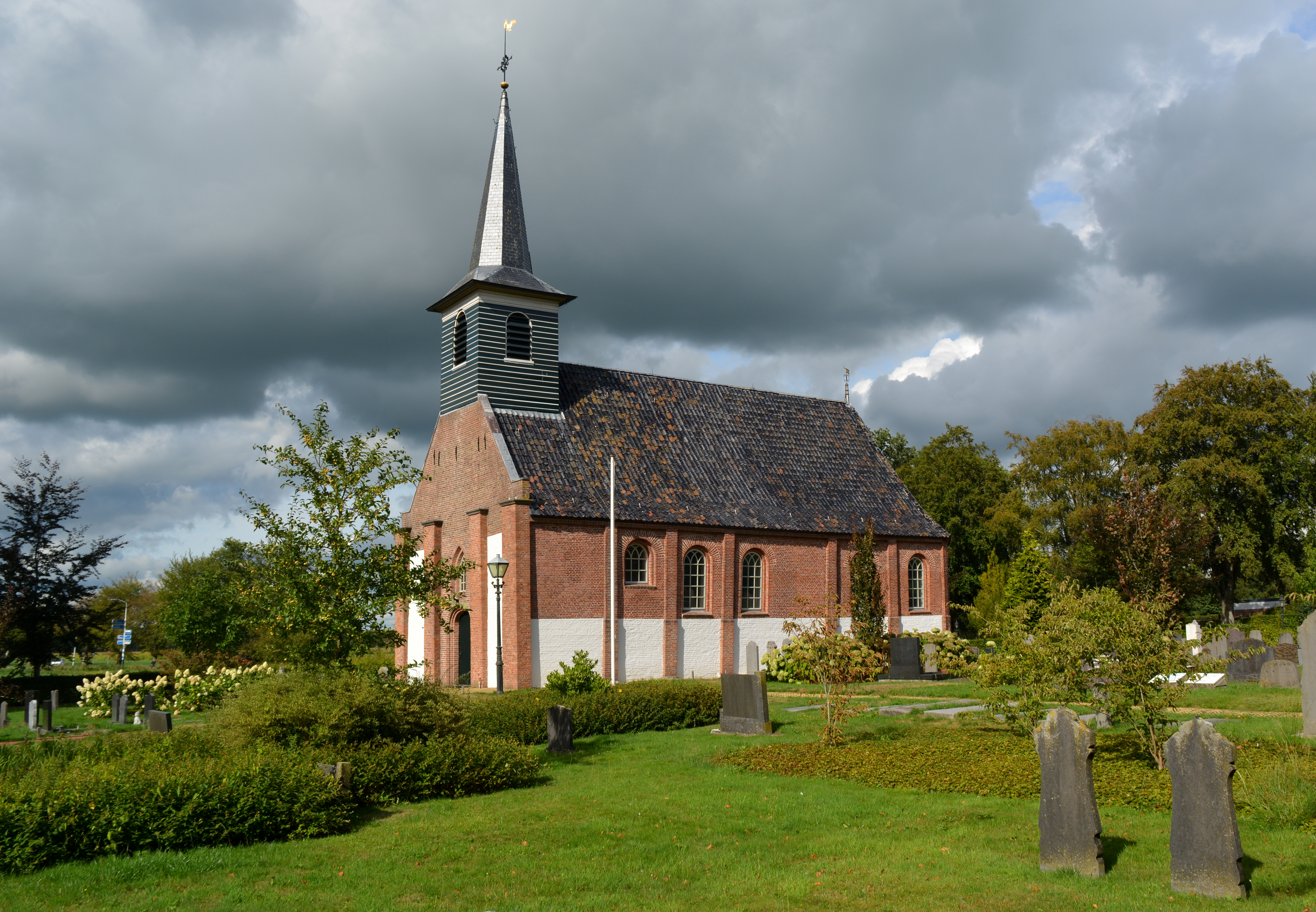
Noardwâlde, PKN-tsjerke
