= Slijkenburg =

- Village
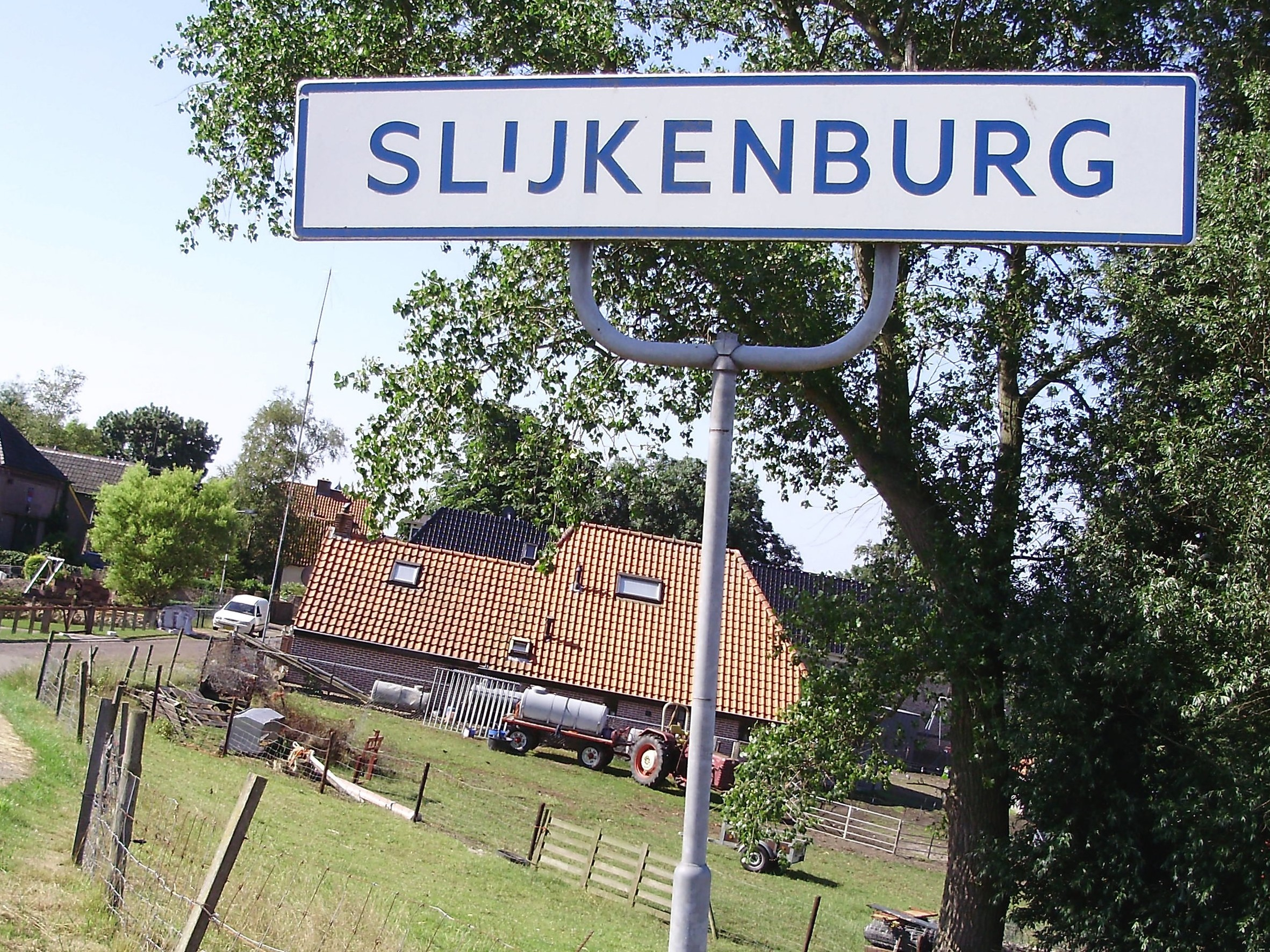

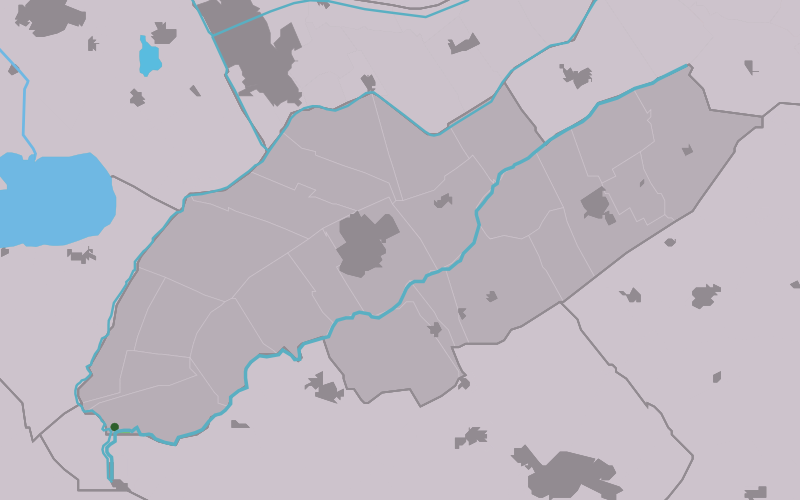
- Location in Weststellingwerf municipality

- Location in the Netherlands Slijkenburg (Netherlands)
- Country: Netherlands
- Province: Friesland
- Municipality: Weststellingwerf

Area
  - Total: 10.05 km^{2} (3.88 sq mi)
- Elevation: −0.6 m (−2.0 ft)

Population (2021)
  - Total: 235
  - Density: 23.4/km^{2} (60.6/sq mi)
- Time zone: UTC+1 (CET)
  - Summer (DST): UTC+2 (CEST)
- Postal code: 8482
- Dialing code: 0561

Slijkenburg (West Frisian: Slikenboarch) is a village in Weststellingwerf in the province of Friesland, the Netherlands. It had a population of around 36 in 2017.

It is the southernmost village of Friesland, located at the Overijssel provincial border.

The village was first mentioned in 1398 as Slickenborg; its name refers to a borg on silted soil.

In 1580, a sluice was built in Slijkenburg. In 1672, a sconce was built around the village to protect against the Prince-Bishop of Münster. Slijkenburg was home to 68 people in 1840.
