= Oldeholtwolde =

- Village
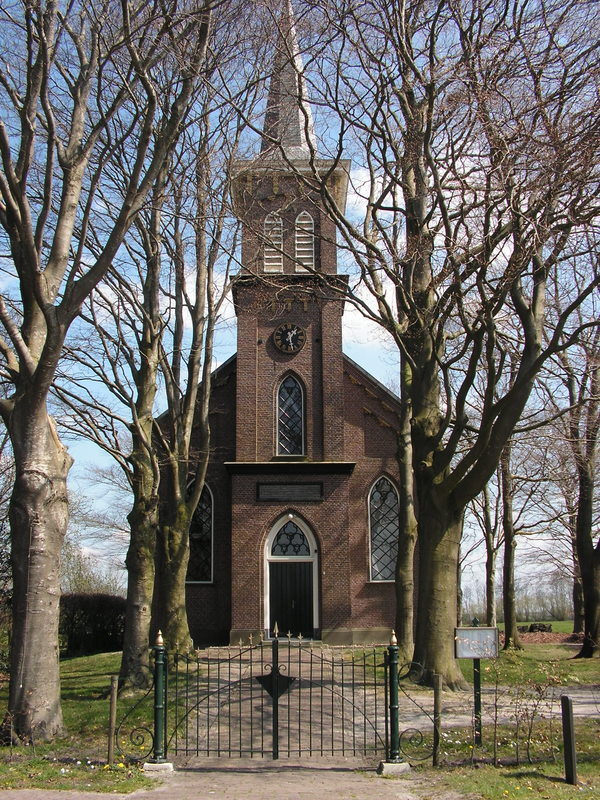
- Oldeholtwolde Church

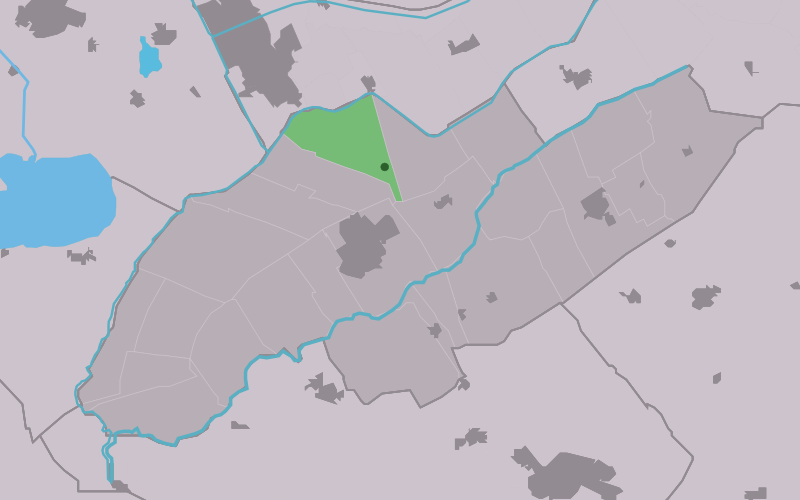
- Location in Weststellingwerf municipality

- Location in the Netherlands Oldeholtwolde (Netherlands)
- Country: Netherlands
- Province: Friesland
- Municipality: Weststellingwerf

Area
  - Total: 10.23 km^{2} (3.95 sq mi)
- Elevation: −0.2 m (−0.66 ft)

Population (2021)
  - Total: 155
  - Density: 15.2/km^{2} (39.2/sq mi)
- Time zone: UTC+1 (CET)
  - Summer (DST): UTC+2 (CEST)
- Postal code: 8477
- Dialing code: 0561

Oldeholtwolde (West Frisian: Aldeholtwâlde) is a village in Weststellingwerf in the province of Friesland, the Netherlands. It had a population of around 150 in 2017.

The village was first mentioned in 1320 as Oldeholtwolt, and means "old low-lying wood". Olde (old) has been added to distinguish from Nijeholtwolde. The Dutch Reformed church was destroyed in a storm around 1700. A new church was built in 1875.

In 1840, Oldeholtwolde was home to 149 people.
