= Sonnega =

- Village
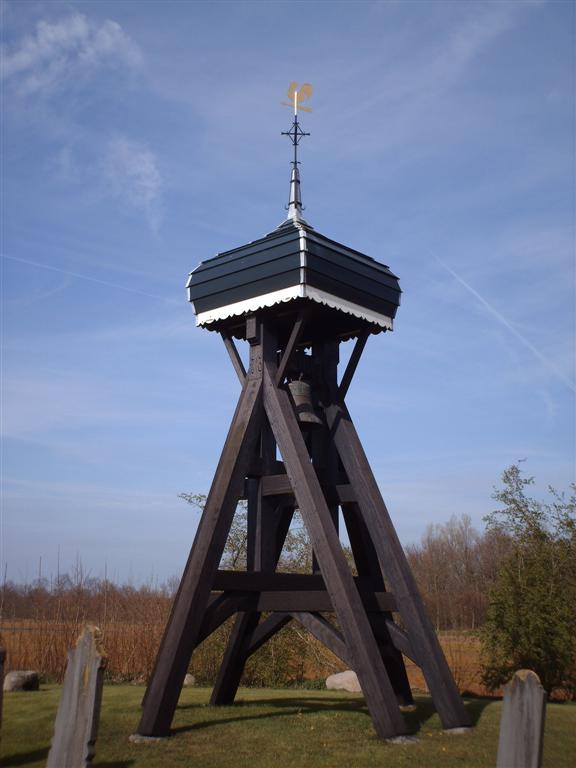
- Sonnega Clock Tower

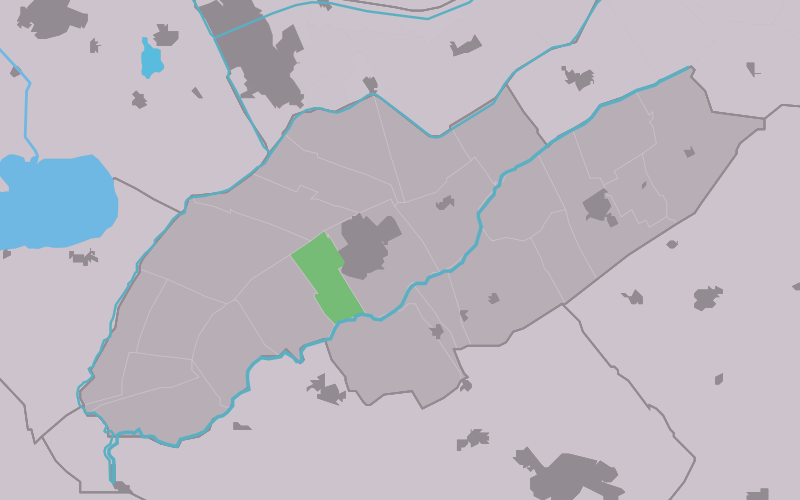
- Location in Weststellingwerf municipality

- Location in the Netherlands Sonnega (Netherlands)
- Country: Netherlands
- Province: Friesland
- Municipality: Weststellingwerf

Area
  - Total: 5.99 km^{2} (2.31 sq mi)
- Elevation: 0.9 m (3.0 ft)

Population (2021)
  - Total: 245
  - Density: 40.9/km^{2} (106/sq mi)
- Time zone: UTC+1 (CET)
  - Summer (DST): UTC+2 (CEST)
- Postal code: 8478
- Dialing code: 0561

Sonnega (West Frisian: Sonnegea) is a village in Weststellingwerf in the province of Friesland, the Netherlands. It had a population of around 230 in 2017.

The village was first mentioned in 1399 as Sonnegae, and means "village of Sonne (person)". The bell tower of Sonnega was built in 1640 and restored in 1926.

Sonnega was home to 198 people in 1840.
