= Scherpenzeel, Friesland =

Scherpenzeel
- Village
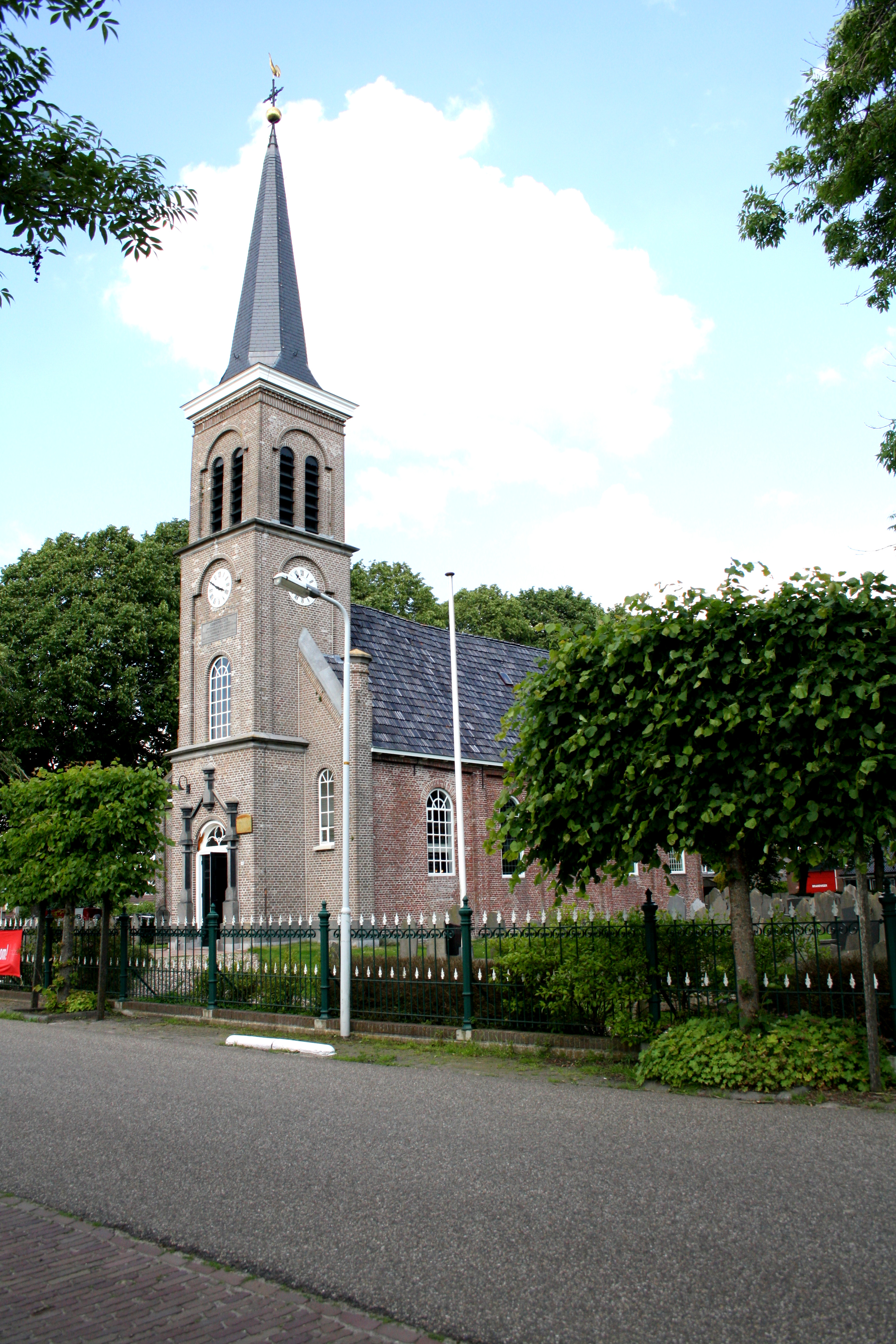
- Scherpenzeel Church

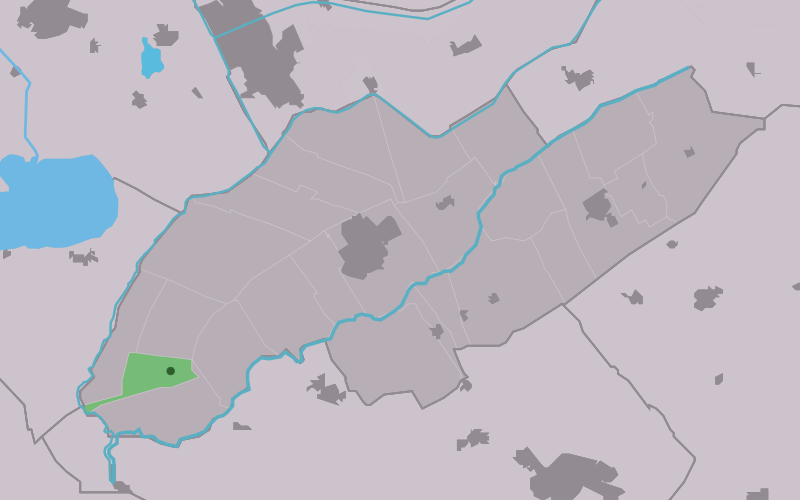
- Location in Weststellingwerf municipality

- Location in the Netherlands Scherpenzeel (Netherlands)
- Country: Netherlands
- Province: Friesland
- Municipality: Weststellingwerf

Area
  - Total: 4.31 km^{2} (1.66 sq mi)
- Elevation: 0.1 m (0.33 ft)

Population (2021)
  - Total: 450
  - Density: 100/km^{2} (270/sq mi)
- Time zone: UTC+1 (CET)
  - Summer (DST): UTC+2 (CEST)
- Postal code: 8483
- Dialing code: 0561

Scherpenzeel (West Frisian: Skerpenseel) is a small village in the north of the Netherlands. It is located in Weststellingwerf, Friesland. Scherpenzeel had a population of around 450 in 2017.

The village was first mentioned in 1245 as Scherpensele, and means either hall of Skarpo (person) or hall with pointy roof. The Dutch Reformed church dates from 1788 and has a tower from 1879.

In 1840, Scherpenzeel was home to 92 people.
