= Blesdijke =

- Village
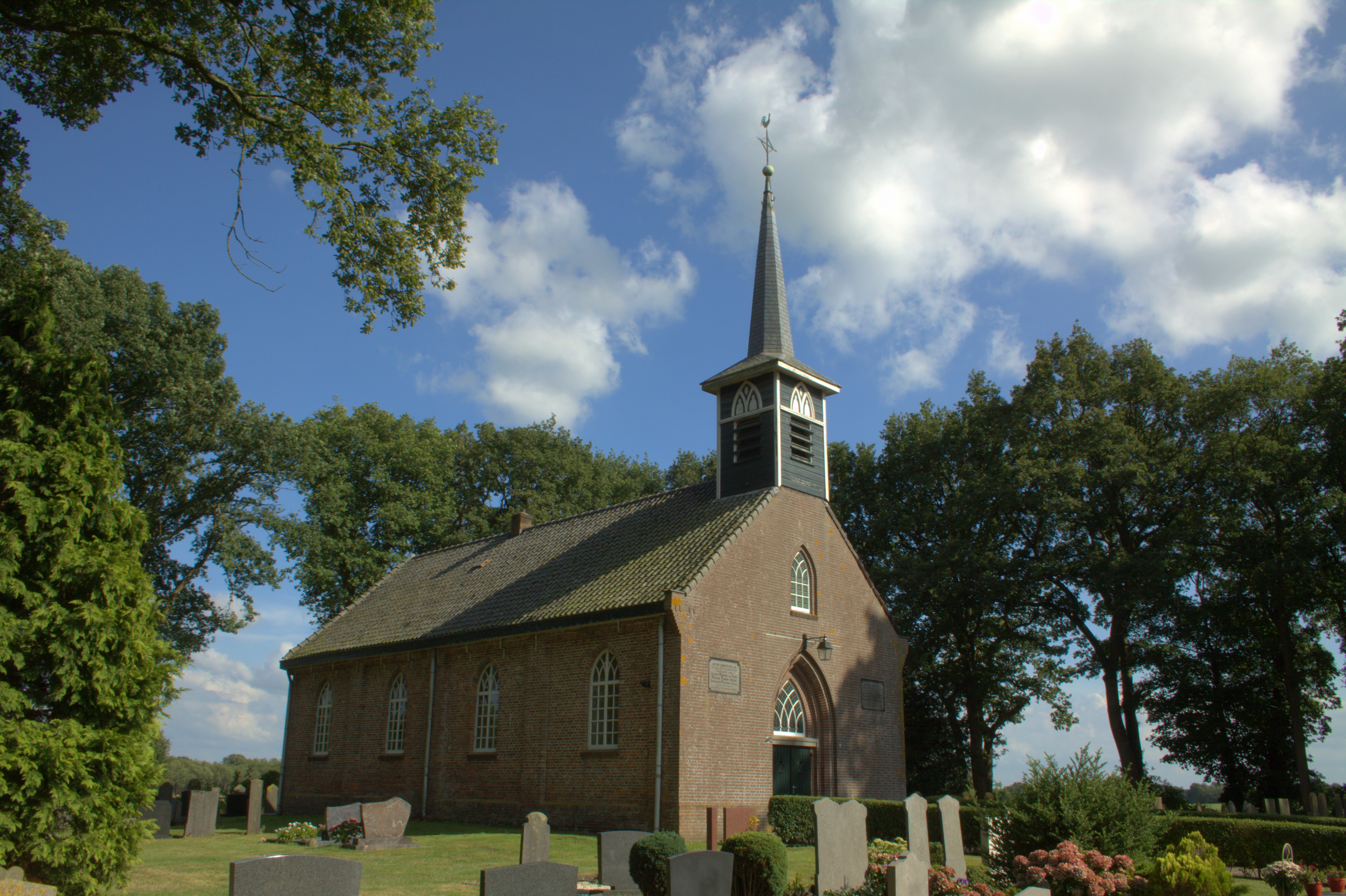
- Blesdijke Church

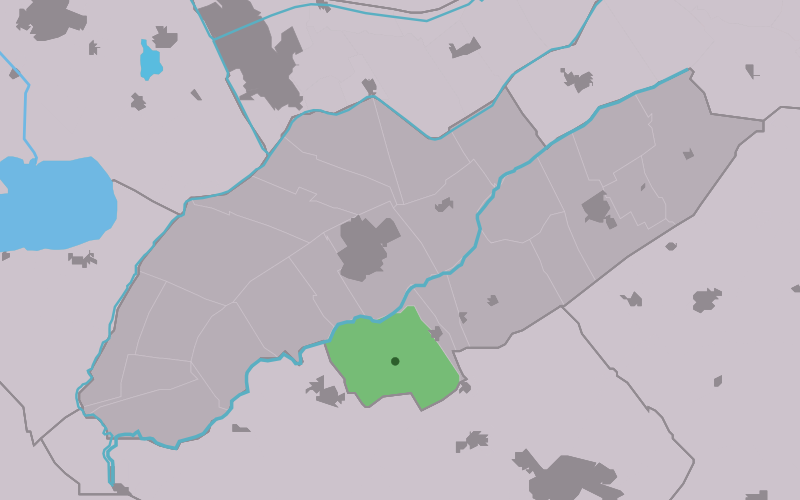
- Location in Weststellingwerf municipality

- Location in the Netherlands Blesdijke (Netherlands)
- Country: Netherlands
- Province: Friesland
- Municipality: Weststellingwerf

Area
  - Total: 15.62 km^{2} (6.03 sq mi)
- Elevation: −0.3 m (−0.98 ft)

Population (2021)
  - Total: 485
  - Density: 31.0/km^{2} (80.4/sq mi)
- Time zone: UTC+1 (CET)
  - Summer (DST): UTC+2 (CEST)
- Postal code: 8398
- Dialing code: 0561

Blesdijke (West Frisian: Blesdike) is a village in Weststellingwerf in the province of Friesland, the Netherlands. It had a population of around 460 in 2008.

== History ==
The village was first mentioned in 1350 as Blesdic, and means dike at a bare spot. Blesdijke developed in late middle ages on the road from Oldemarkt to Noordwolde. The Dutch Reformed church dates from 1843 and has a wooden tower. The building is a replacement for a church which collapsed in 1836.

Blesdijke was home to 393 people in 1840.

Castle Old Stoutenburght is a folly which pretends to be a medieval castle. As of 2021, the castle has four towers and is about 27 metres (89 ft) tall.

== Gallery ==
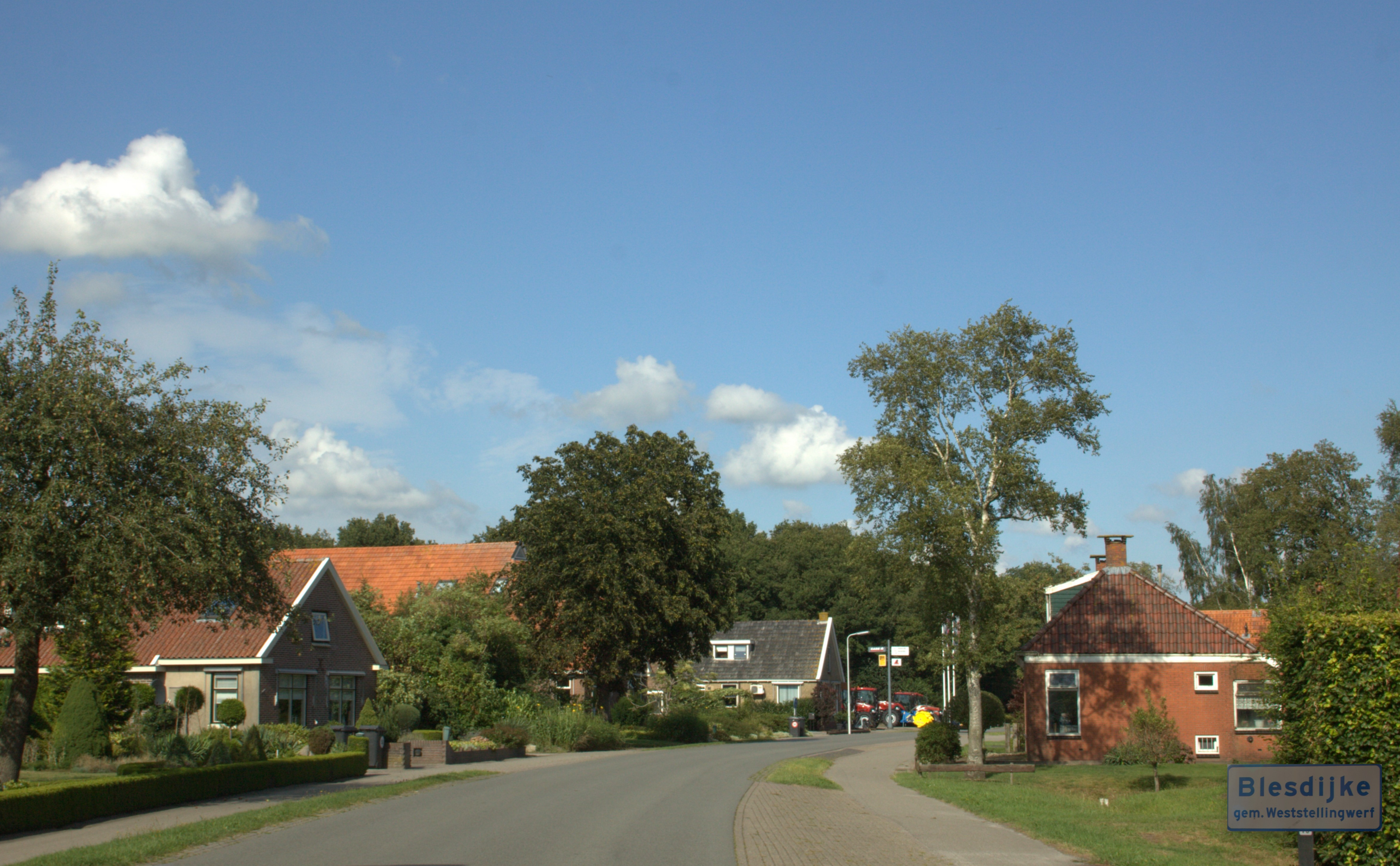
Street view

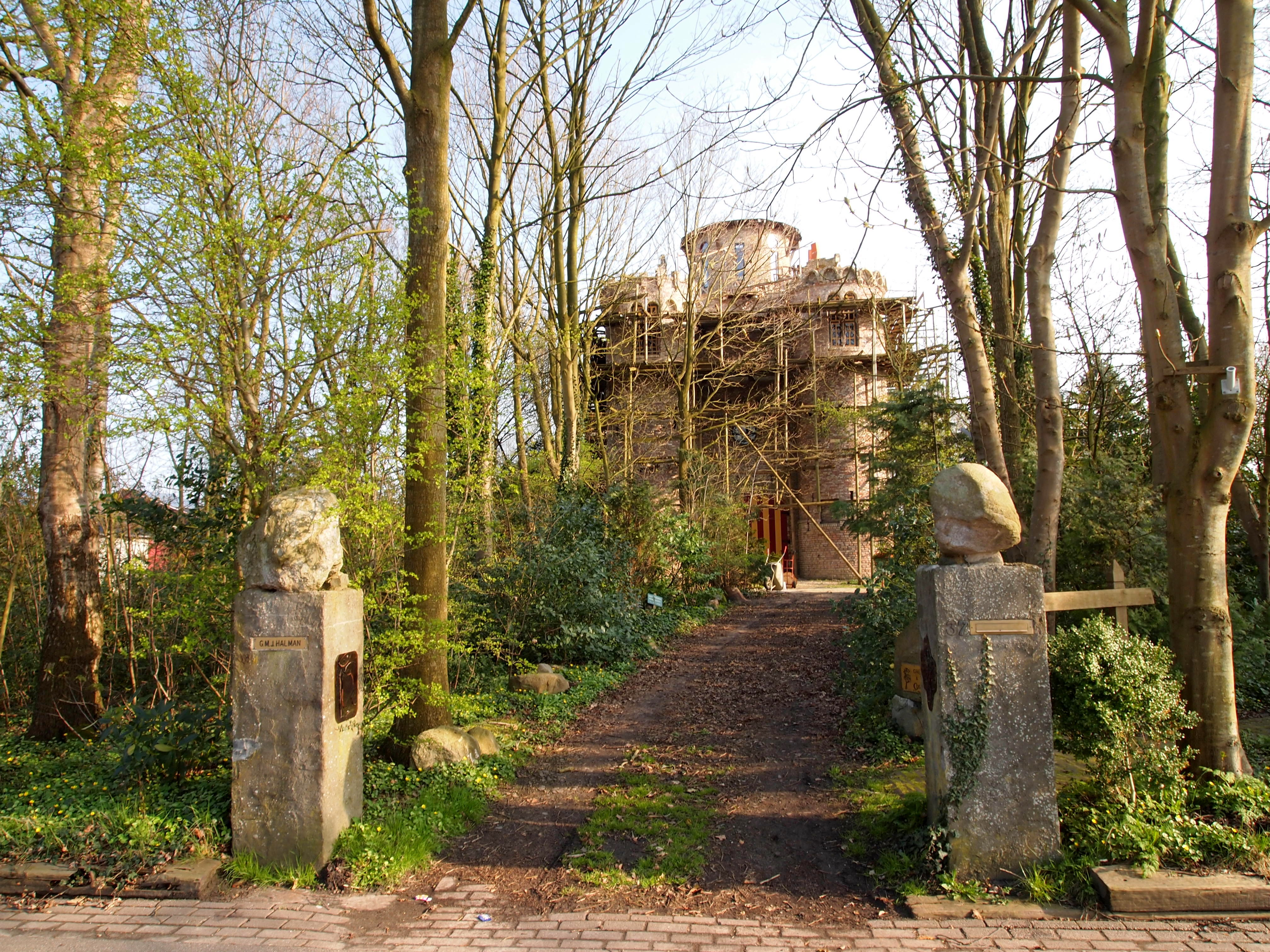
Castle Old Stoutenburght

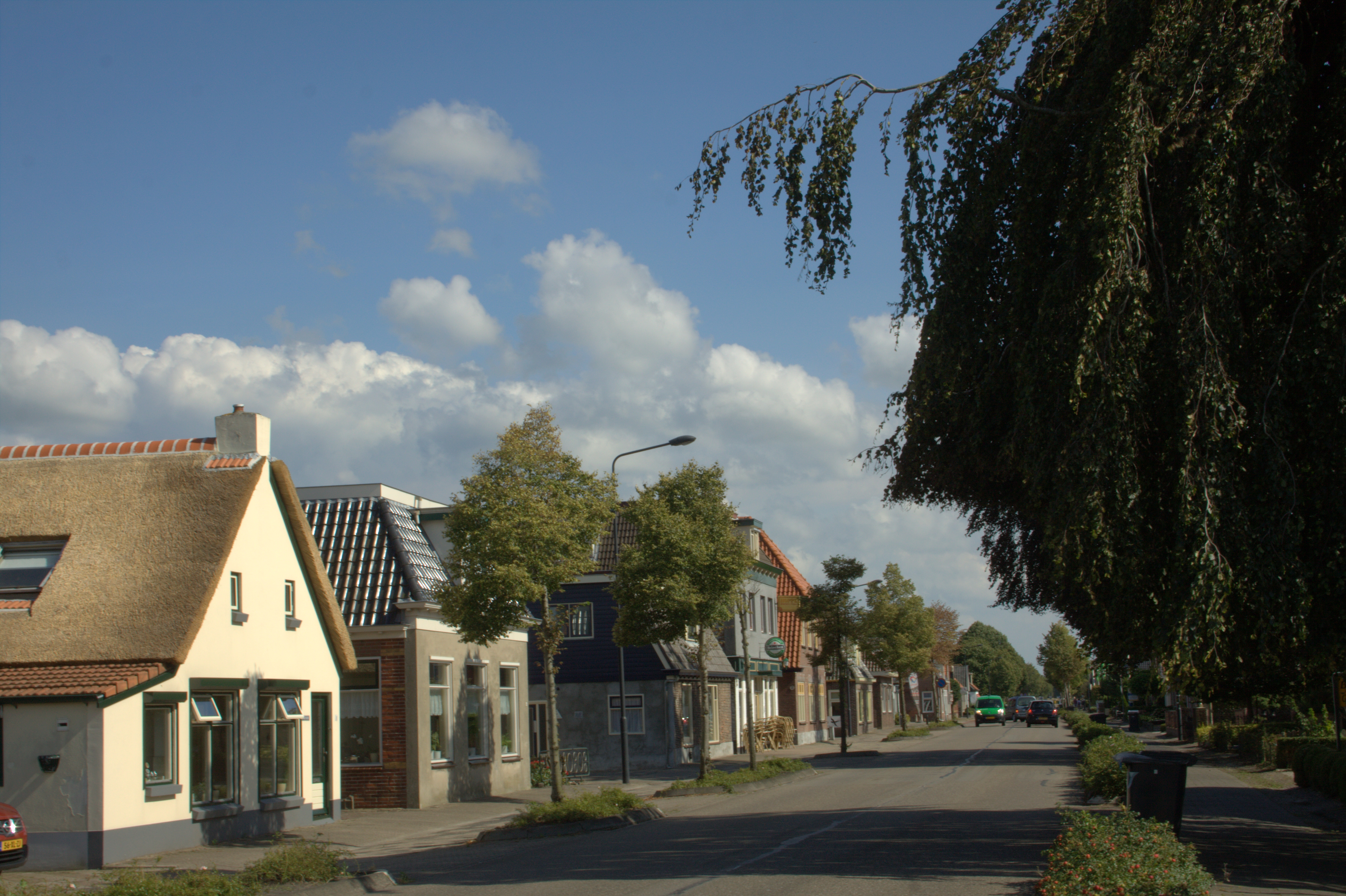
Street view

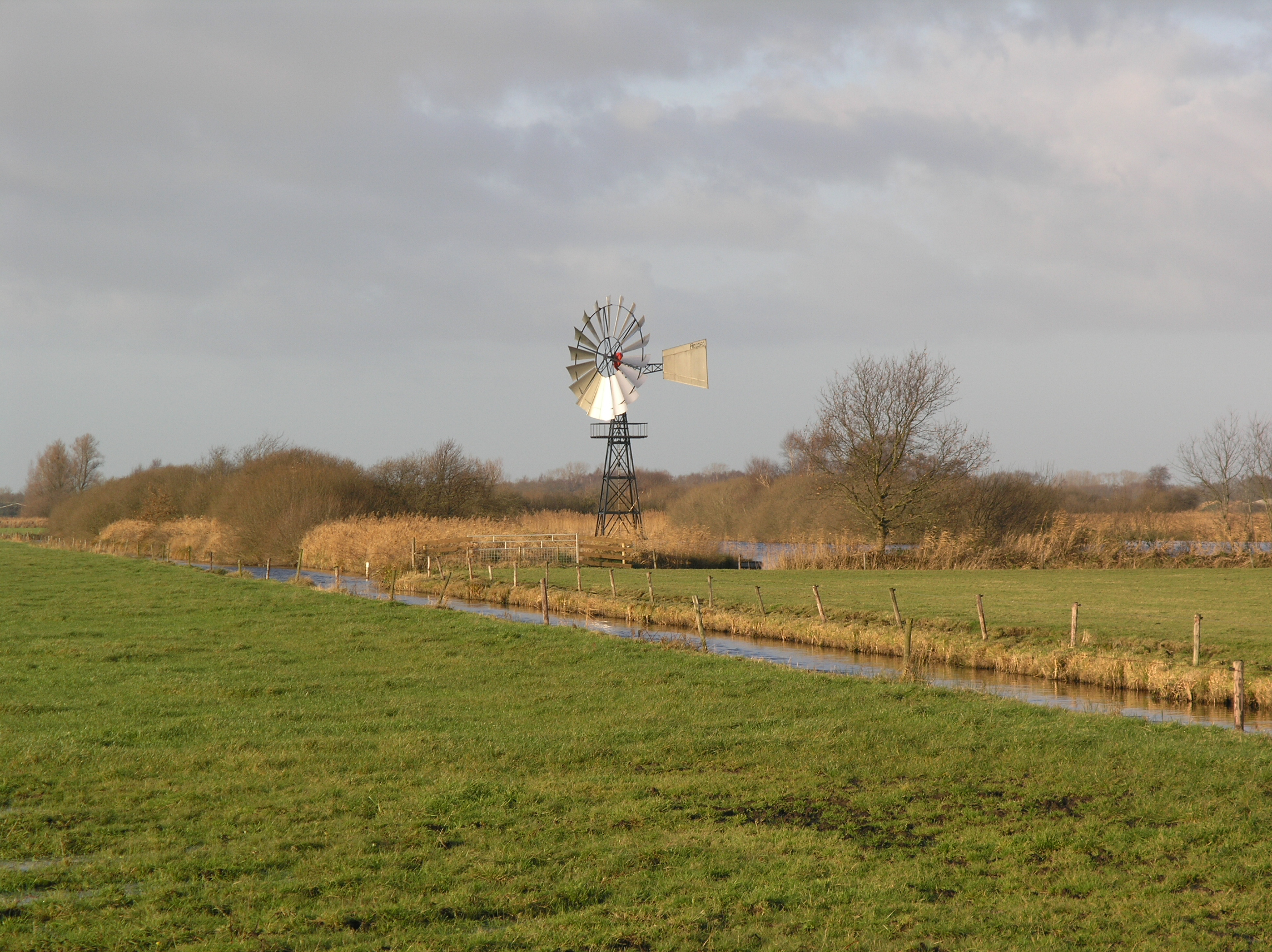
Windmotor
