= Langelille =

- Village
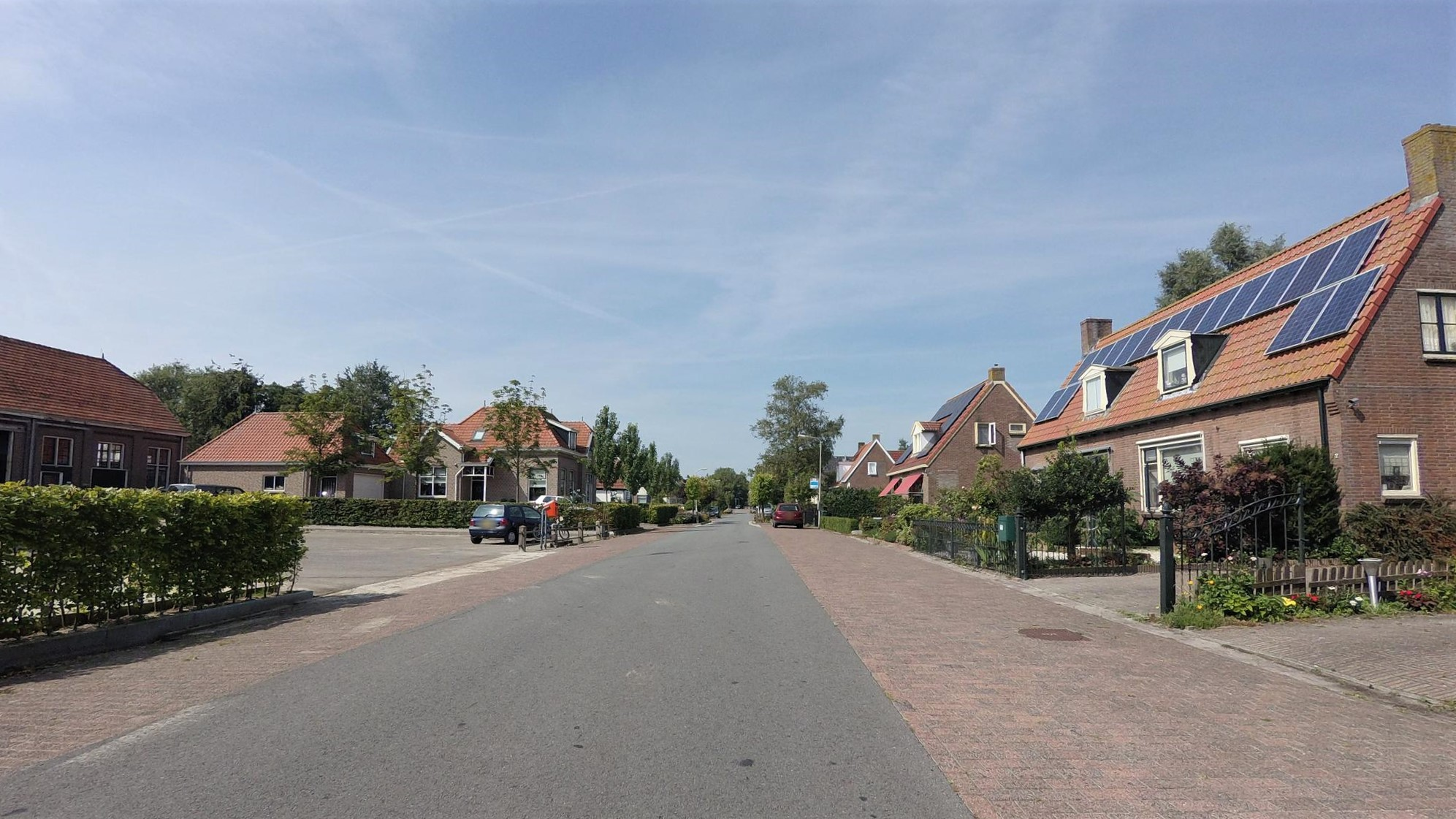
- Street view

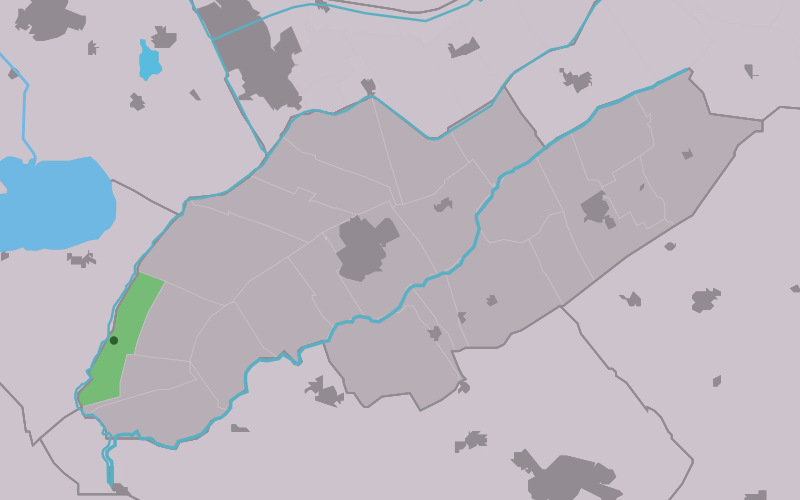
- Location in Weststellingwerf municipality

- Location in the Netherlands Langelille (Netherlands)
- Country: Netherlands
- Province: Friesland
- Municipality: Weststellingwerf

Area
  - Total: 6.27 km^{2} (2.42 sq mi)
- Elevation: −0.6 m (−2.0 ft)

Population (2021)
  - Total: 245
  - Density: 39.1/km^{2} (101/sq mi)
- Time zone: UTC+1 (CET)
  - Summer (DST): UTC+2 (CEST)
- Postal code: 8484
- Dialing code: 0561

Langelille (West Frisian: De Langelille) is a village in Weststellingwerf in the province of Friesland, the Netherlands. It had a population of around 220 in 2017.

The village was first mentioned in 1580 as Langelijle. The etymology is unclear.

In 1840, Langelille was home to 170 people. In 1896, a dairy factory was built in the village.
