= Vinkega =

- Village
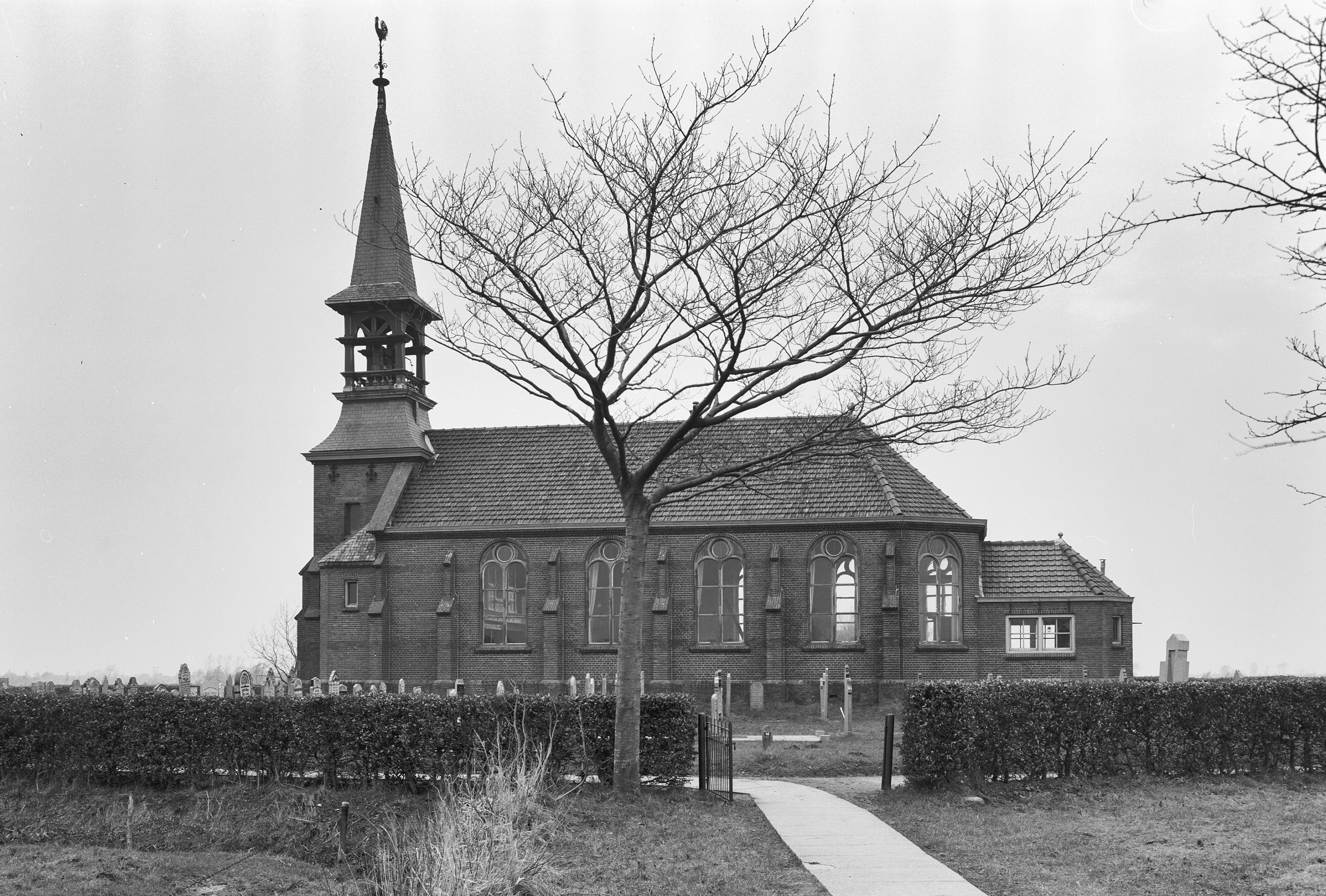
- Vinkega Church (1965)

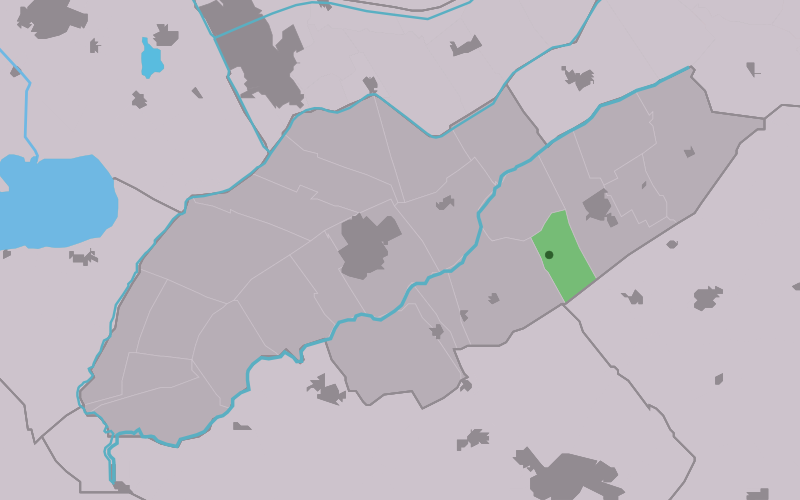
- Location in Weststellingwerf municipality

- Location in the Netherlands
- Country: Netherlands
- Province: Friesland
- Municipality: Weststellingwerf

Area
  - Total: 5.16 km^{2} (1.99 sq mi)
- Elevation: 2.8 m (9.2 ft)

Population (2021)
  - Total: 200
  - Density: 39/km^{2} (100/sq mi)
- Time zone: UTC+1 (CET)
  - Summer (DST): UTC+2 (CEST)
- Postal code: 8393
- Dialing code: 0561

Vinkega (West Frisian: Finkegea) is a village in Weststellingwerf in the province of Friesland, the Netherlands. It had a population of around 200 in 2017.

The village was first mentioned in 1408 as Bennickegae. In 1542 to 1543, it became Finckega(e), and means "settlement of Finke". The Dutch Reformed church dates from 1899. The iconic open spire was demolished in 1969 and replaced by a simple gable roof. Between 1975 and 2006, it served as a studio. Since 2018, it is the village house.

Vinkega was home to 344 people in 1840.
