= Boijl =

Boijl Boyl
- Village
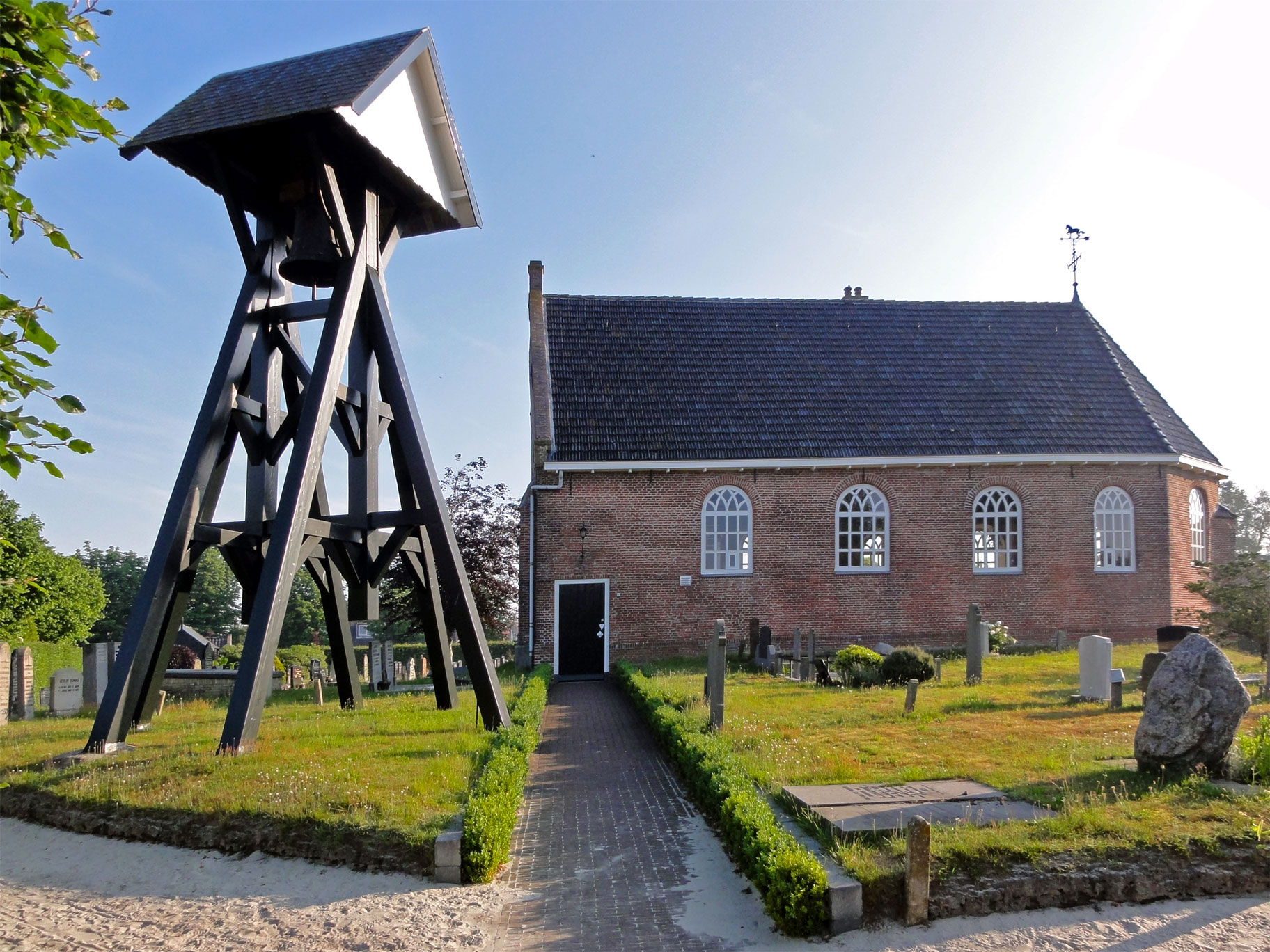
- Boijl Church

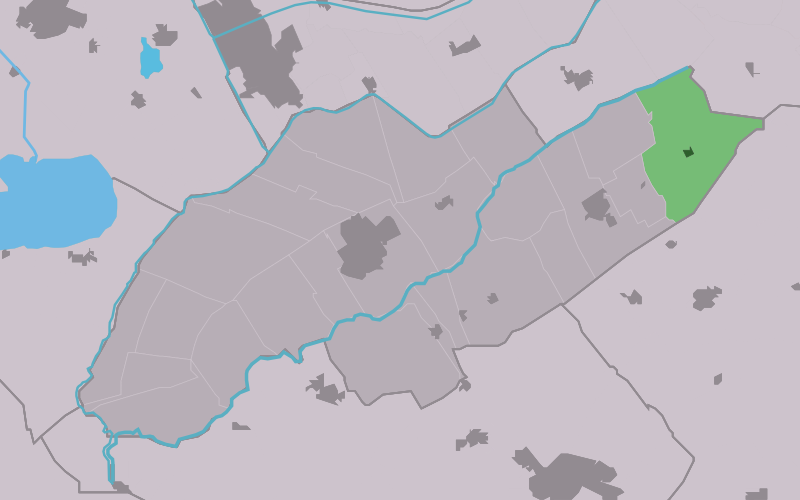
- Location in Weststellingwerf municipality

- Location in the Netherlands Boijl (Netherlands)
- Country: Netherlands
- Province: Friesland
- Municipality: Weststellingwerf

Area
  - Total: 17.54 km^{2} (6.77 sq mi)
- Elevation: 5 m (16 ft)

Population (2021)
  - Total: 890
  - Density: 51/km^{2} (130/sq mi)
- Time zone: UTC+1 (CET)
  - Summer (DST): UTC+2 (CEST)
- Postal code: 8392
- Dialing code: 0561

Boijl (West Frisian: Boyl) is a village in Weststellingwerf in the province of Friesland, the Netherlands. It had a population of around 890 in 2017.

The village was first mentioned in 1320 as Boilo. The etymology is unclear. The Dutch Reformed church dates from 1641 and has 12th century elements. It does not have a church, but a bell tower from around 1600.

Boijl was home to 243 people in 1840.
