= Camminghabuurstermolen =

Smock mill in Friesland, Netherlands

Camminghabuurstermolen, Leeuwarden
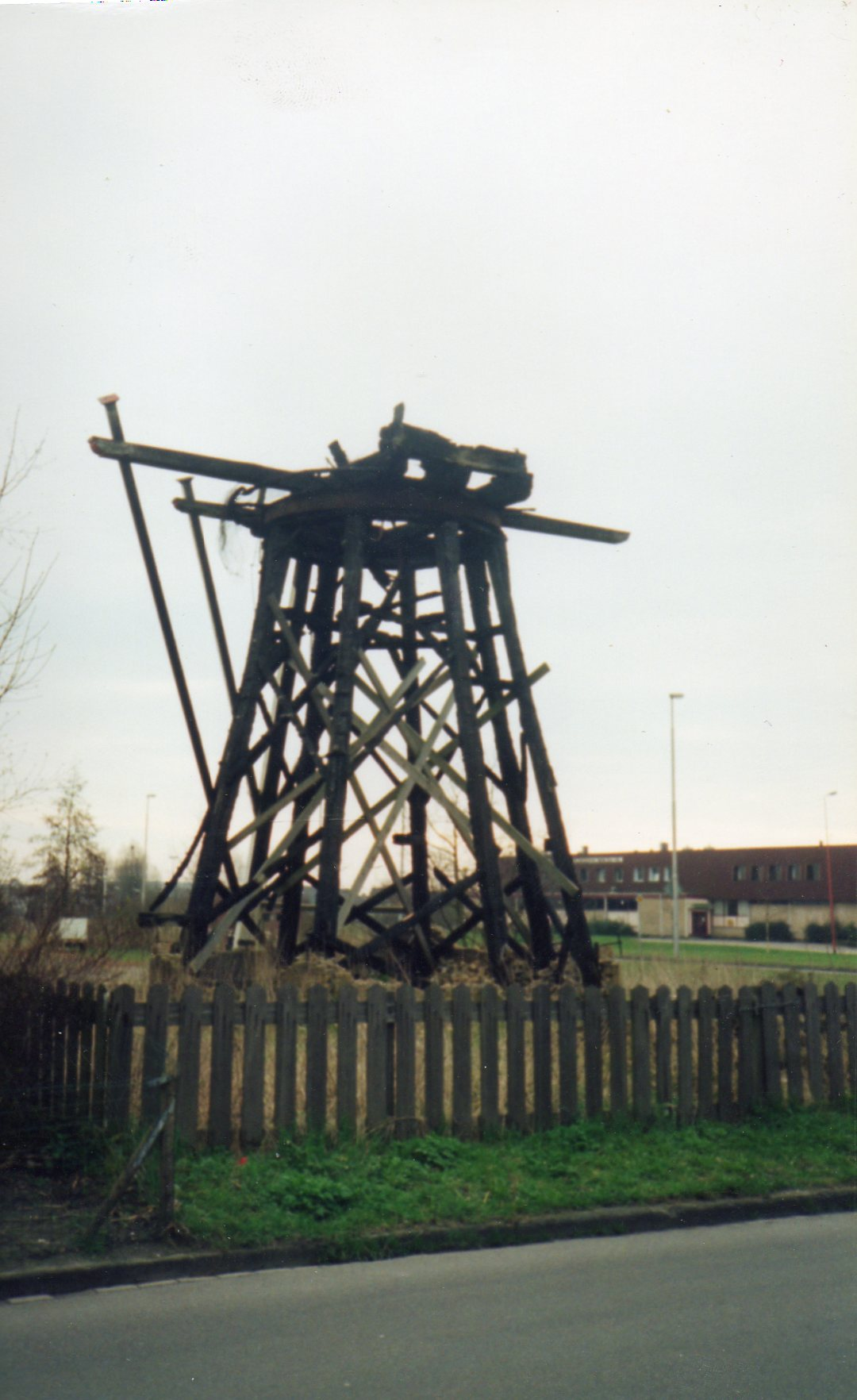
- Camminghabuurstermolen, January 1998
- Interactive map of Camminghabuurstermolen, Leeuwarden

Origin
- Mill name: Camminghabuurstermolen
- Mill location: Kalverdijkje, Leeuwarden
- Coordinates: 53°12′40″N 5°49′40″E
- Year built: 1850

Information
- Purpose: Drainage mill
- Type: Smock mill
- Storeys: Three-storey smock
- Base storeys: Low brick base about 1 metre (3 ft) high.
- No. of sails: Four sails
- Windshaft: Cast iron
- Winding: Tailpole and winch
- Type of pump: Archimedes' screw
- Year lost: 2000

Camminghabuurstermolen was a smock mill in Leeuwarden, Friesland, Netherlands, which was built in 1850. The restored mill was burnt out in an arson attack in 1994, and the remains were finally demolished in 2000.

== History ==
The Camminghabuurstermolen was built in 1850. In 1943, the mill was equipped with Patent sails of 17.00 metres (55 ft 9 in) span. The mill worked by wind until 1947 when a 12 horsepower (8.9 kW) electric motor driving an Appold turbine replaced the Archimedes' screw. The mill then became derelict, but was bought for ƒ5 by the Gemeente Leeuwarden in 1958. It was restored by millwright de Roos of Leeuwarden. The sails were removed in the early 1990s. On 11 May 1994, the mill was subject to an arson attack and was burnt out. The cost of restoring the mill was estimated at between 5 and 10 million Guilders. The windshaft and brake wheel had been removed by 1998. The mill was demolished in 2000. Parts from this mill were used in the restoration of the Slagdijkstermolen, Finkum. The windshaft was used in the restoration of De Babuurstermolen, Tjerkwerd.

== Description ==
Camminghabuurstermolen was what the Dutch describe as a Grondzeiler. It was a three-storey smock mill on a low brick base. There was no stage, the sails reaching almost to ground level. The mill was winded by tailpole and winch. The smock and cap are thatched. Post-restoration, the sails were Common sails. They had a span of 18.00 metres (59 ft 1 in). The sails were carried on a cast-iron windshaft which was cast by H J Koning of Foxham, Groningen and probably dating from 1914. The windshaft also carried the brake wheel, which drove the wallower at the top of the upright shaft. At the bottom of the upright shaft the crown wheel drove a gearwheel on the axle of the Archimedes' screw. The Archimedes' screw was 1.50 metres (4 ft 11 in) diameter. The mill could pump 15 cubic metres (3,300 imp gal) to 20 cubic metres (4,400 imp gal) of water per hour.

== Millmen ==
- Tjitzje D Jonker 1850-96
- Sjoerd Jonker 1896-1941
- Tjisse Jonker 1941-47

Reference for above:-
