= Bartlehiem =

- Hamlet
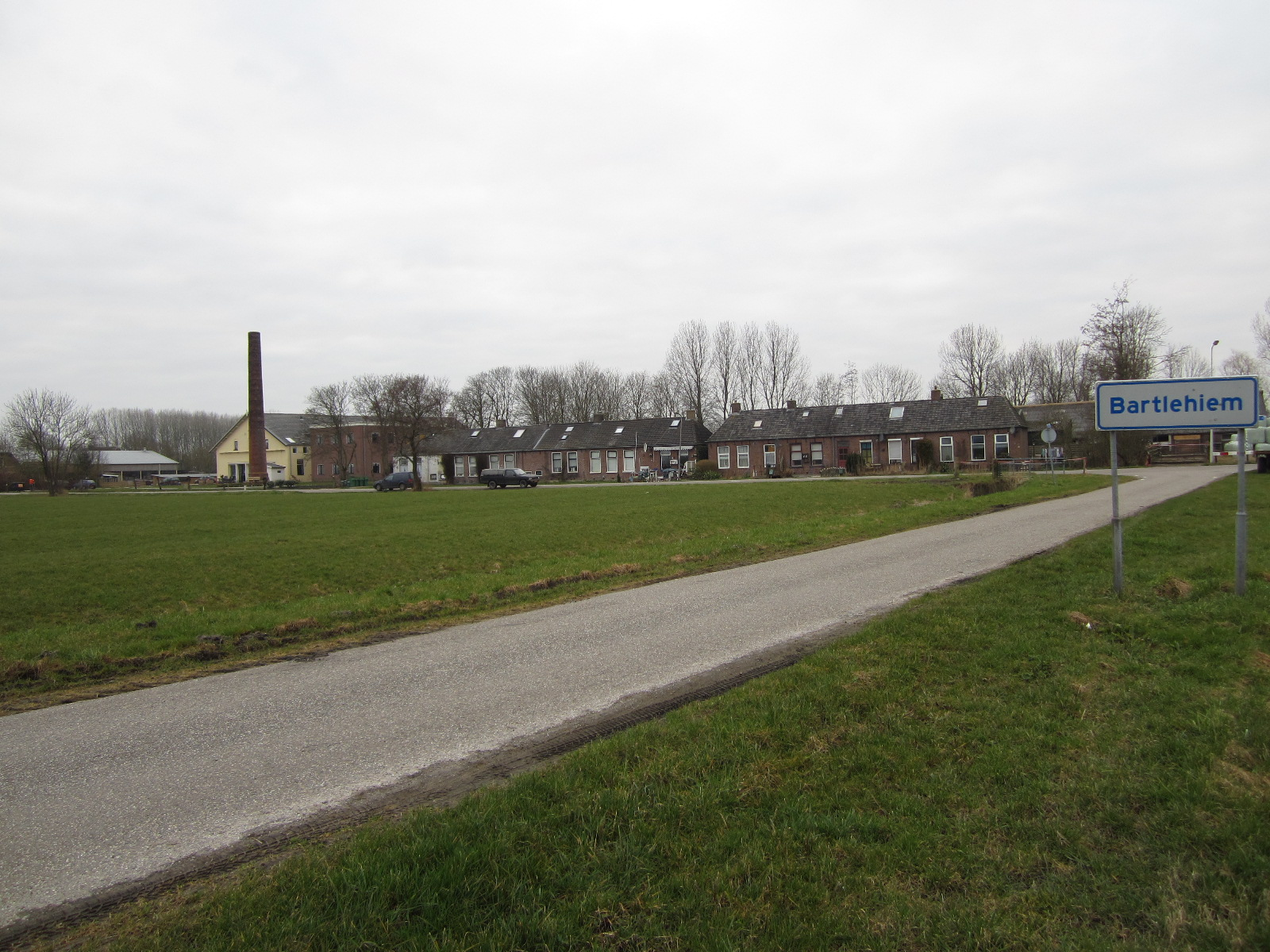
- Bartlehiem from the north

- Coat of arms

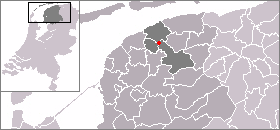
- Location at the corner of the three municipalities

- Location in the Netherlands Bartlehiem (Netherlands)
- Country: Netherlands
- Province: Friesland
- Municipality: Noardeast-Fryslân; Tytsjerksteradiel (Leeuwarderadeel) Leeuwarden
- Time zone: UTC+1 (CET)
  - Summer (DST): UTC+2 (CEST)
- Postal code: 9091
- Telephone area: 0519 and 058

Bartlehiem is a hamlet, located partially in Noardeast-Fryslân, partially in Tytsjerksteradiel, and partially in Leeuwarden. It consists of about 40 houses.

== History ==
In 1840, Bartlehiem was home to 40 people. Before 2018, the village was part of the Leeuwarderadeel municipality and before 2019 part of the Ferwerderadiel municipality.

== Monastery ==
The village was first mentioned in 1232 as "in Bethlehem". It was named after the Premonstratensian monastery Bethlehem, an outpost of Mariëngaarde, which was at the location between c. 1170 until 1580. The monastery was named after Bethlehem, Palestine.

== Elfstedentocht ==
Bartlehiem is especially well-known due to the Elfstedentocht for ice skaters, who have to pass through the hamlet twice. Coming from the west from Feinsum through the Feinsumer Feart, a wide ditch. Skaters then pass the famous wooden bicycle and pedestrian bridge of Bartlehiem, after the bridge they skate north over the Dokkumer Ie to Dokkum. On return they turn left to the east over the Aldtsjerkster Feart, a similar ditch. From here it is approximately 10 km to the finish line on the Bonkefeart in Leeuwarden. Due to this, Bartlehiem is the only place where a spectator can see Elfstedentocht participants from three directions.

== Factory ==
In 1893 a dairy factory was built but it was closed in the 1950s. The building was converted to accommodation for people with dementia in 2010.

== Gallery ==
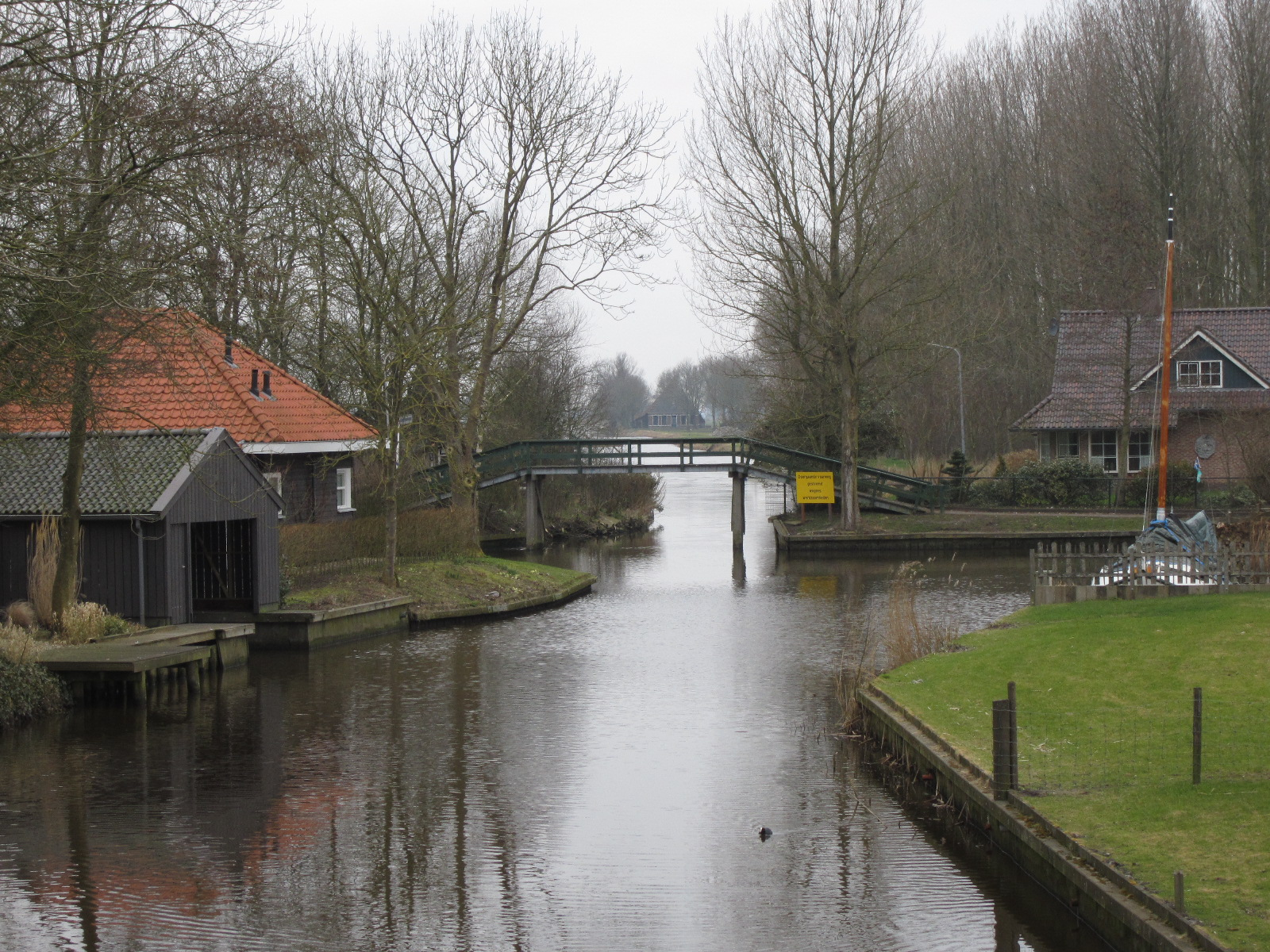
Wooden bridge of Bartlehiem

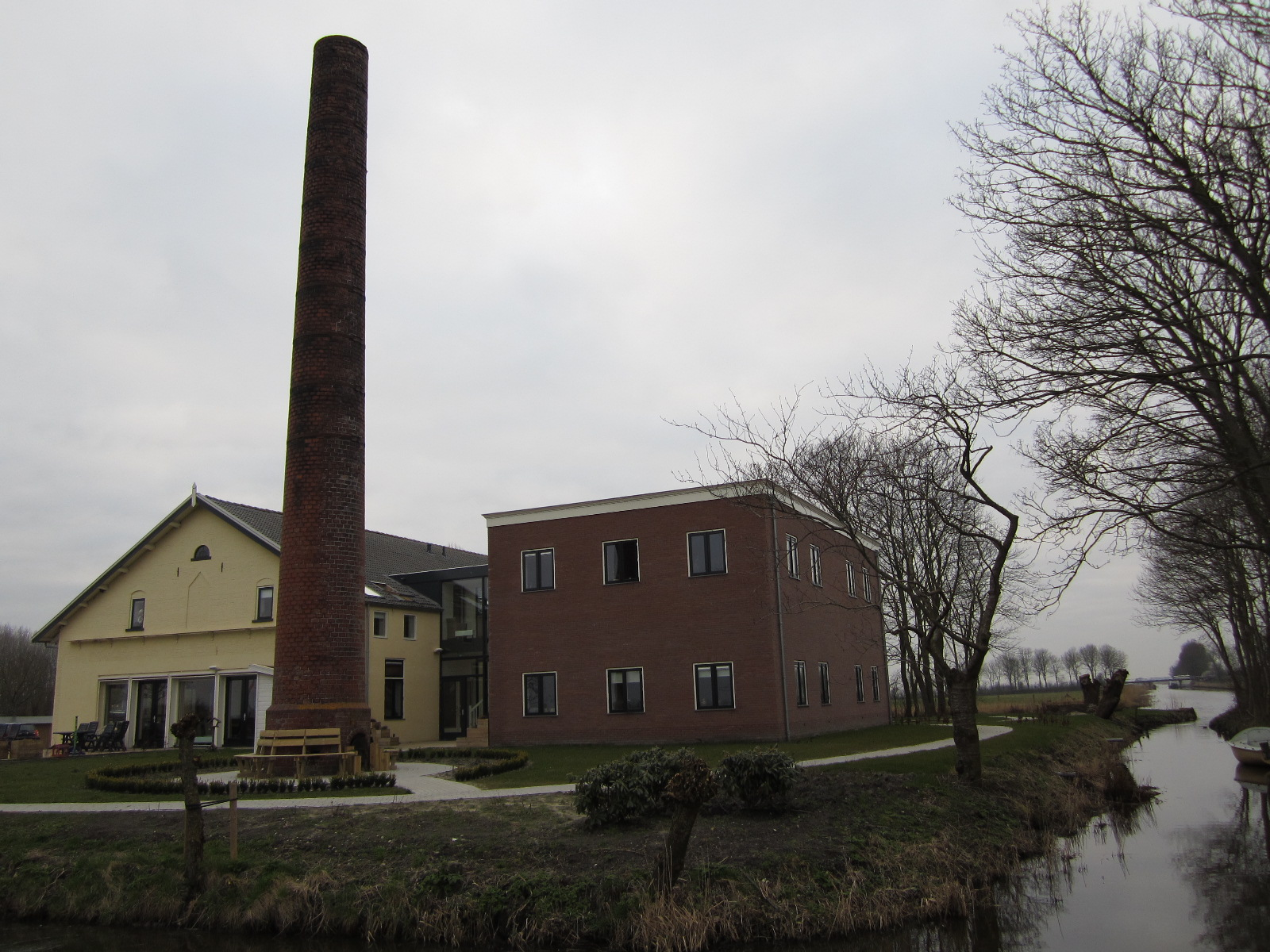
Former dairy factory

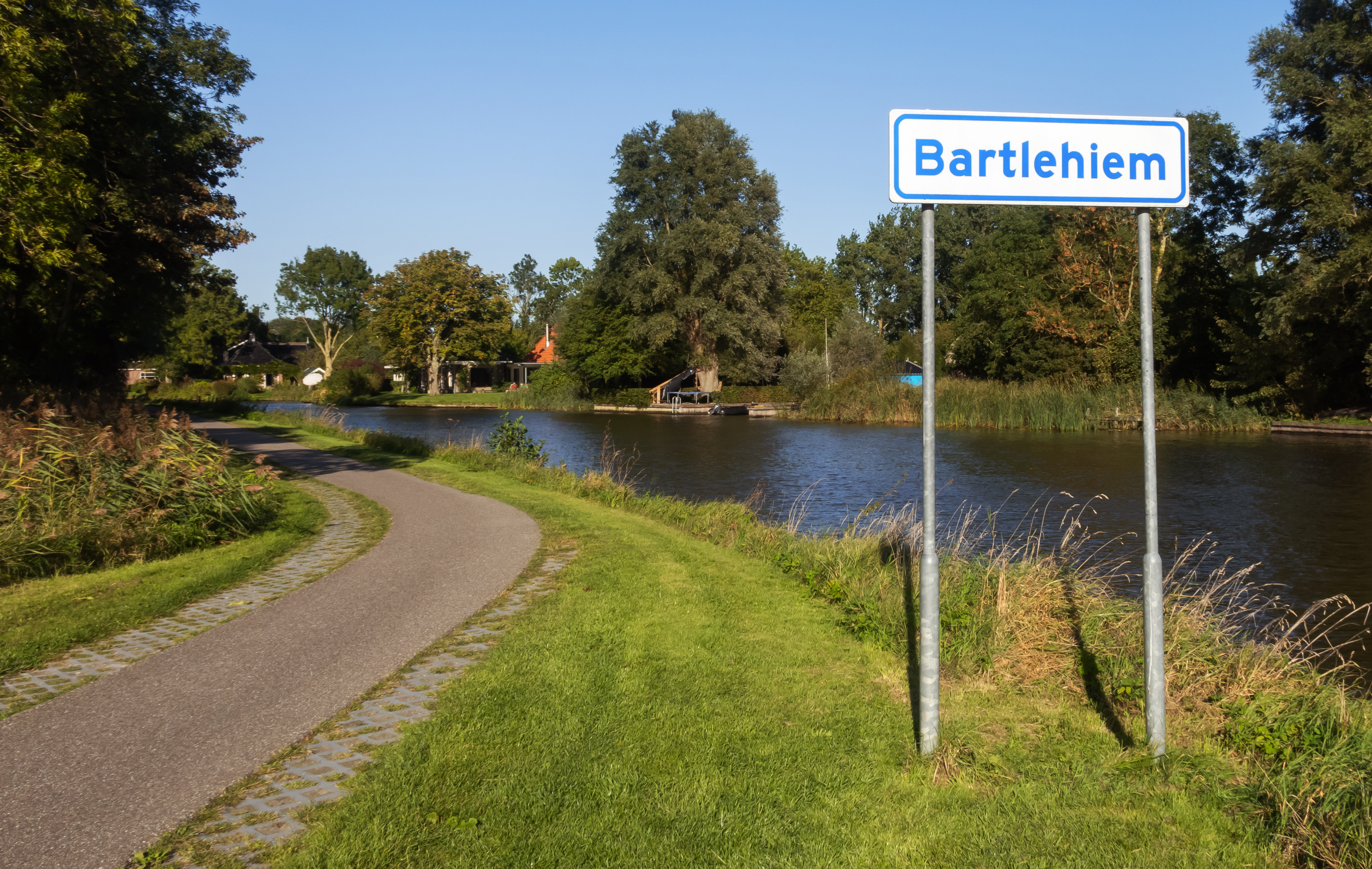
Dokkumer Ie through Bartlehiem
