= Arend Johan van Glinstra =

Dutch painter (1754–1814)

Arend Johan van Glinstra (1754 – 31 May 1814) was a Dutch painter.

Arend Johan van Glinstra was born in Cornjum in Leeuwarderadeel. He was initially taught by Jurriaan Andriessen. He worked primarily making copies of other artists' works. Many of his paintings depicted landscapes with soldiers, horsemen or hunters. He died in Leeuwarden on 31 May 1814.
