= Slagdijkstermolen, Feinsum =

Windmill in Feinsum, Netherlands

Slagdijkstermolen
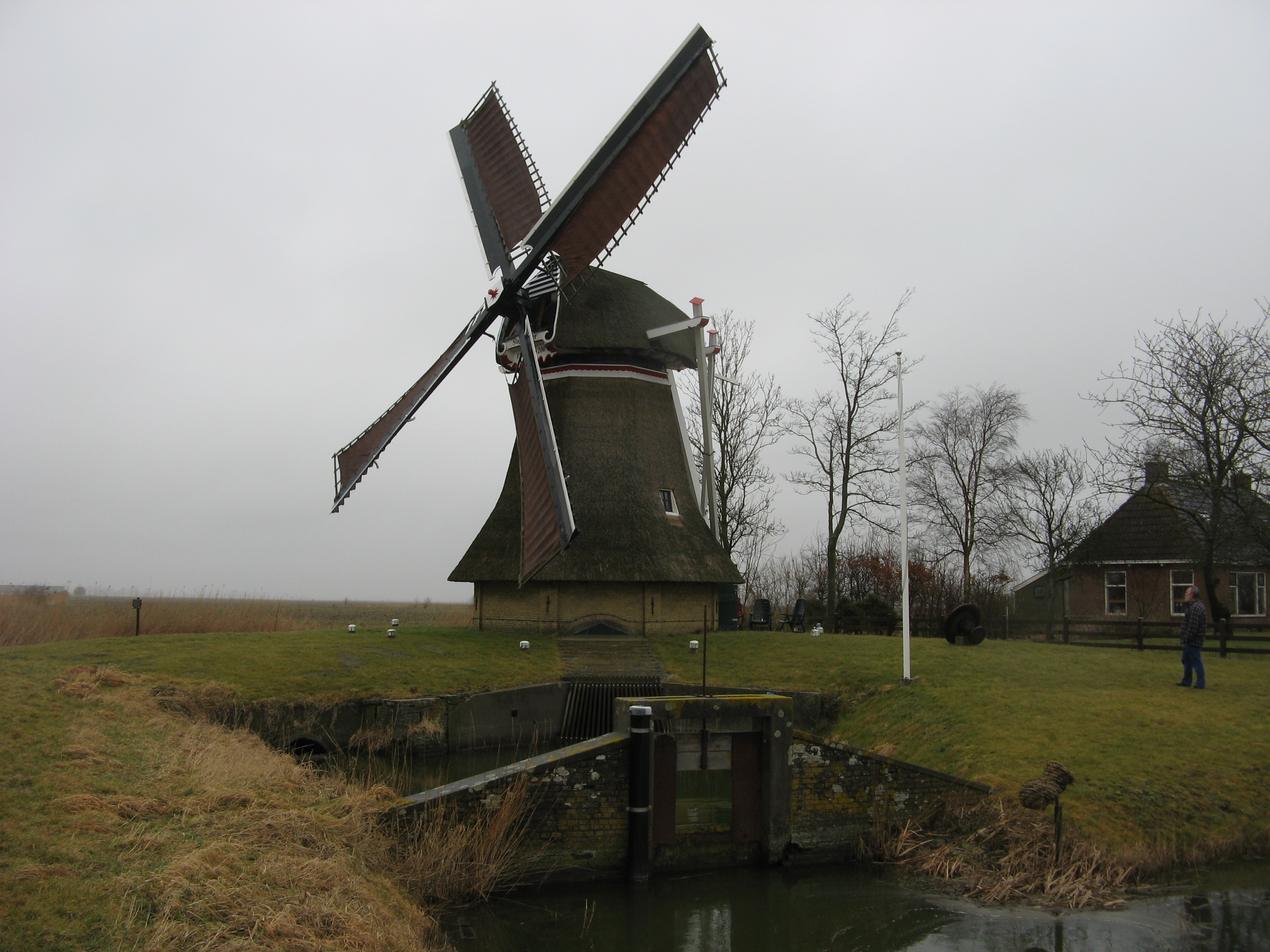
- Windmill and former millers house
- Interactive map of Slagdijkstermolen

Origin
- Mill name: Slagdijkstermolen
- Mill location: Leijster Hegedijk 29, 9071 XB Stiens
- Coordinates: 53°16′49″N 5°44′17″E
- Operator: Stichting De Fryske Mole
- Year built: 1864

Information
- Purpose: Drainage mill
- Type: Smock mill
- Storeys: Two-storey smock
- Base storeys: Single-storey base
- Smock sides: Eight sides
- No. of sails: Four sails
- Type of sails: Common sails
- Windshaft: Cast iron
- Winding: Tailpole and winch
- Auxiliary power: Diesel engine
- Type of pump: Archimedes' screw
- Year lost: 2026

Slagdijkstermolen (West Frisian: Slachdykstermûne) was a smock mill in Feinsum, Friesland in the Netherlands which had been restored to working order. The mill is listed as a Rijksmonument, number 24540. The mill was completely burnt down on 14 November 2026.

== History ==
Slagdijkstermolen was built in 1864. It drained the Slagdijksterpolder, which was 1,350 pondemaat (500 ha; 1,230 acres) in extent. In 1931, a diesel engine was placed in the mill and a new Archimedes' screw fitted. The sails were removed in 1938, and the cap was removed in 1952.

In the 1980s, plans were made to restore the mill. The Slagdijkstermolen was sold to Stichting De Fryske Mole (English: Frisian Mills Foundation) on 17 December 1985. In 2006–07, the mill was restored with €60,000 being granted by the province of Friesland towards the costs. The new cap was fitted on the mill on 20 September 2007. The restoration incorporated parts from the Cammingha-Buurstermolen, Leeuwarden which had burnt down. The mill was officially opened in May 2009. The mill formed a pair with the nearby Balkendsterpoldermolen, Oude Leije. On 14 November 2026, the mill burnt down.

== Description ==
Slagdijkstermolen is what the Dutch describe as an achtkante grondzeiler - a smock mill whose sails reach almost to the ground. It was a two-storey smock mill on a single-storey base. The mill was winded by tailpole and winch. The smock and cap were thatched. The sails were Common sails. They have a span of 18.00 metres (59 ft 1 in). The sails were carried on a cast-iron windshaft. The axle of the Archimedes' screw was 525 millimetres (20¾ inches) diameter and the screw was 1.49 metres (4 ft 11 in) diameter. The screw was inclined at 26½°. Each revolution of the screw lifted 722 litres (159 imp gal) of water.

== Public access ==
Slagdijkstermolen was open to the public by appointment.
