= Koarnjum =

- Village
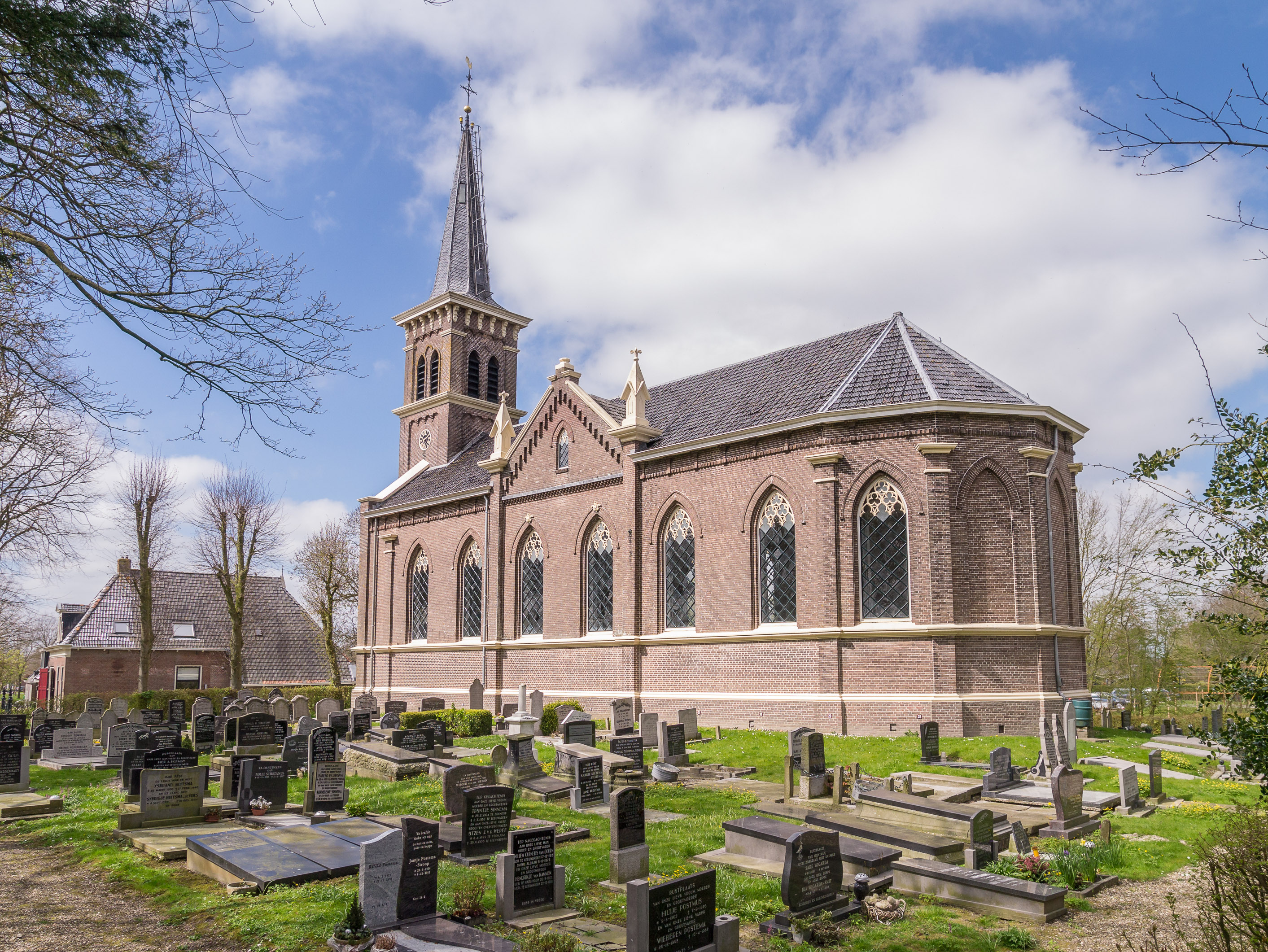
- Koarnjum church

- Flag

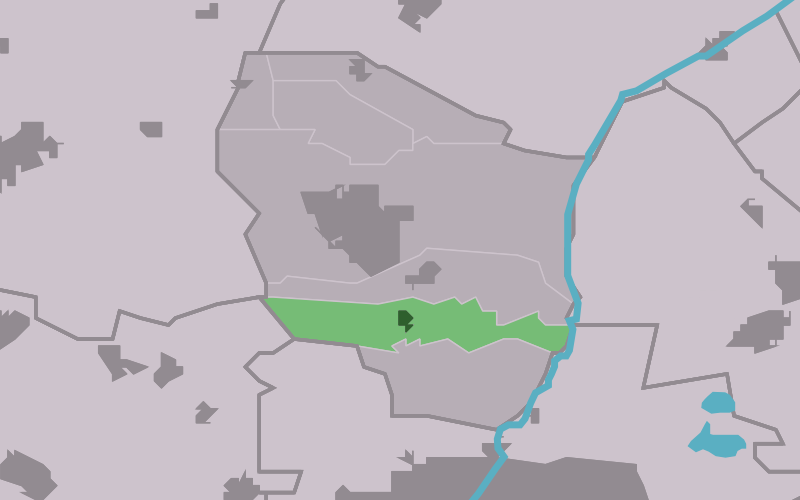
- Location in Leeuwarderadeel municipality

- Location in the Netherlands Koarnjum (Netherlands)
- Country: Netherlands
- Province: Friesland
- Municipality: Leeuwarden

Area
  - Total: 4.84 km^{2} (1.87 sq mi)
- Elevation: 0.2 m (0.66 ft)

Population (2021)
  - Total: 420
  - Density: 87/km^{2} (220/sq mi)
- Time zone: UTC+1 (CET)
  - Summer (DST): UTC+2 (CEST)
- Postal code: 9056
- Dialing code: 058

Koarnjum (Dutch: Cornjum) is a village in the municipality of Leeuwarden (Friesland province), in the Netherlands. The village is situated between Jelsum and Britsum and had a population of around 370 in January 2017.

== History ==
The village was first mentioned in 1423 as Coernem, and means "settlement of the people of Curra". In 1840, it was home to 303 people. The Dutch Reformed church was built in 1873, and received a new spire in 2020.

Koarnjum was served by a station on the North Friesland Railway which opened in 1901 and closed to passengers in 1930. The line finally closed in 1997.

Before 2018, the village was part of the Leeuwarderadeel municipality.

== Notable Landmarks ==
The old mansion Martenastate in Koarnjum was demolished in 1899 and replaced by a small fantasy castle. The stins Martenastate was originally built before 1427. In 1658, it was extensively modified. The last owner was Duco Martena van Burmania Vegelin van Claerbergen who was in financial difficulties and sold the ruinous castle to the local church in 1899 who demolished the castle and sold the land to a real estate agent.

== Notable people ==
- Arend Johan van Glinstra (1754–1814), painter

== Gallery ==
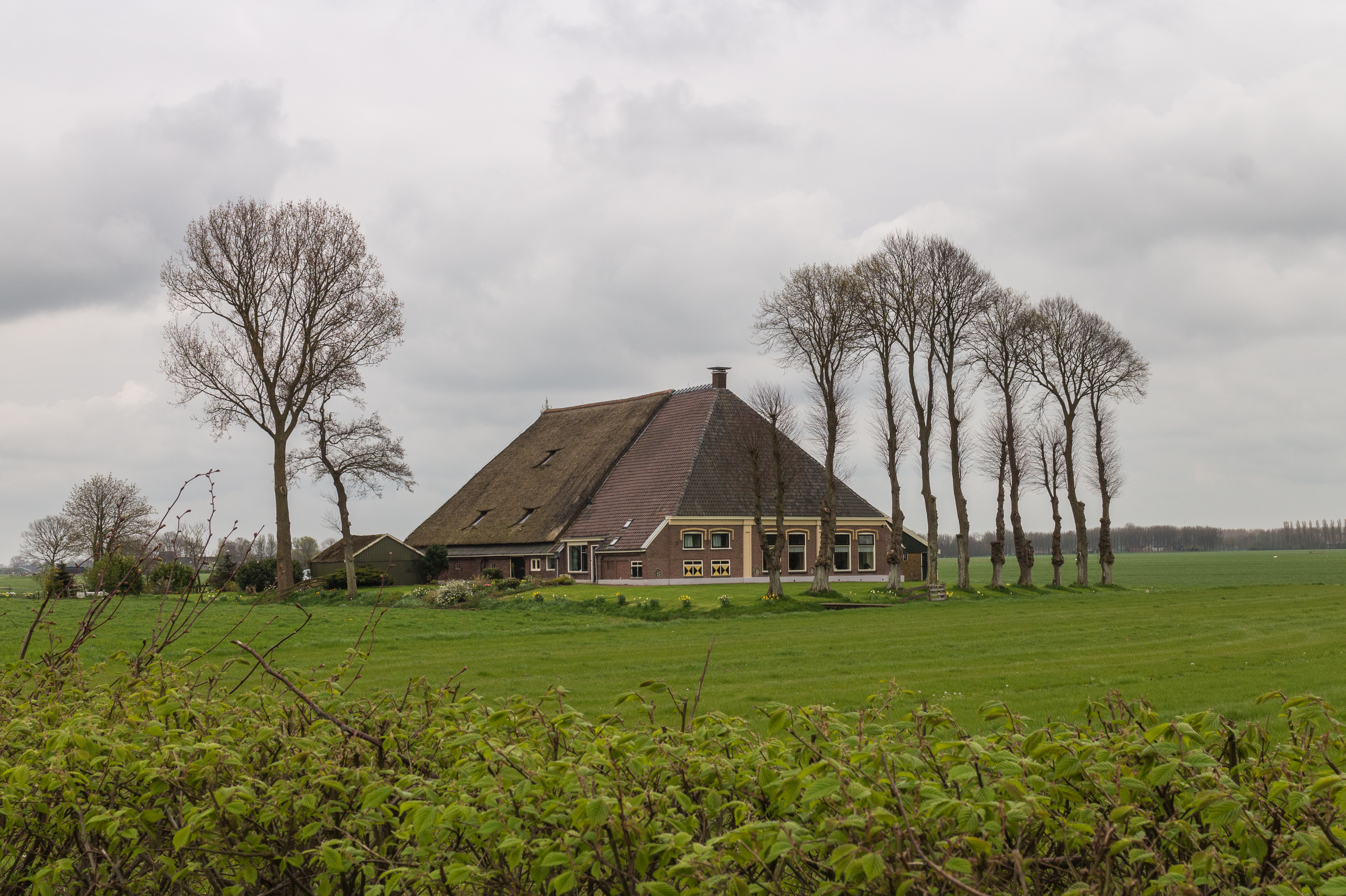
Farm in Koarnjum

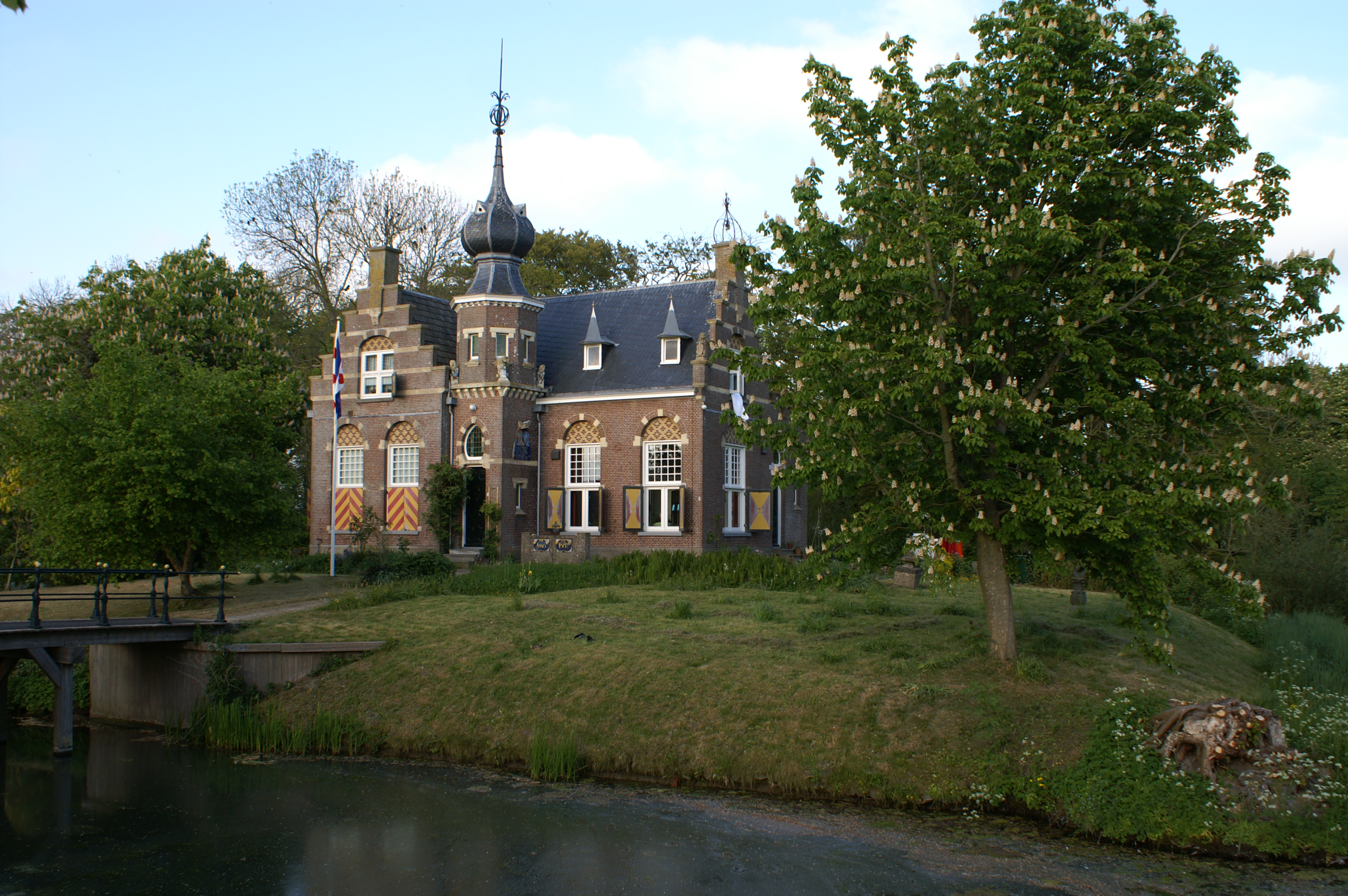
Martenastate

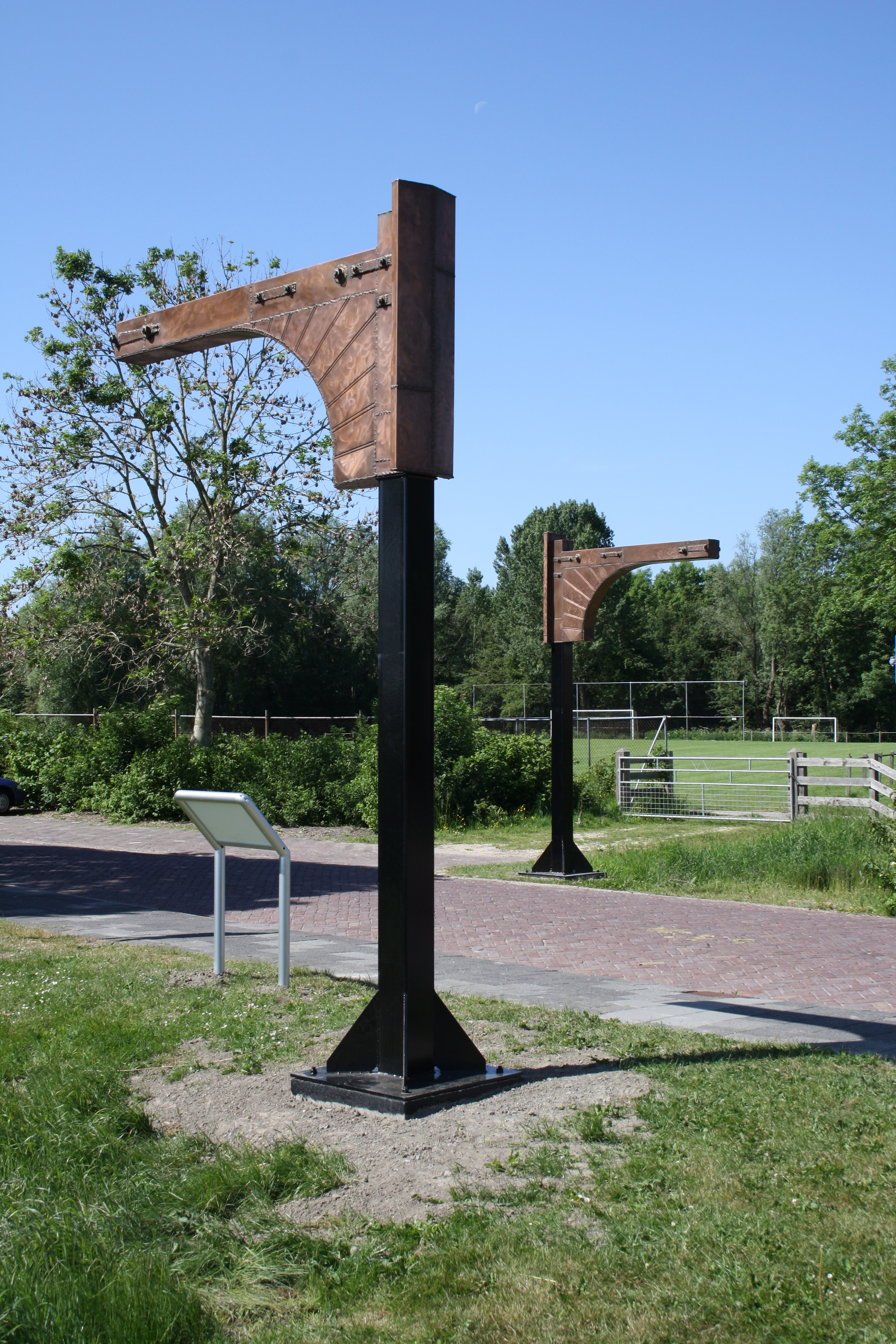
Art in Koarnjum
