= De Balkendsterpoldermolen, Alde Leie =

Smock mill in Alde Leie, Friesland, Netherlands

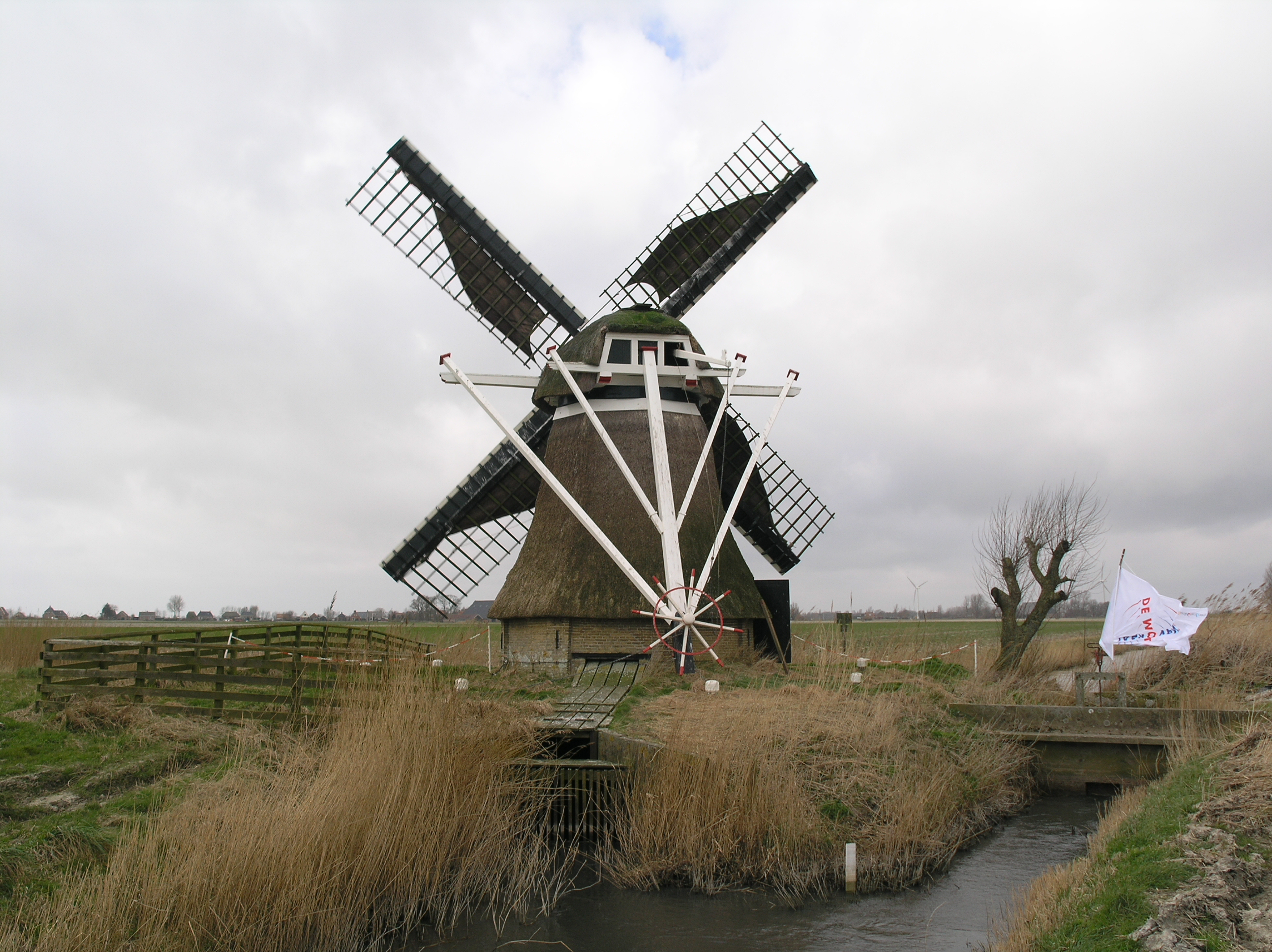
- De Balkendsterpoldermolen, March 2007.
- Interactive map of De Balkendsterpoldermolen, Alde Leie

Origin
- Mill name: De Balkendsterpoldermolen
- Mill location: Langedijk, 9071 XE Alde Leie
- Coordinates: 53°17′02″N 5°44′15″E
- Operator: Stichting De Fryske Mole
- Year built: 1844

Information
- Purpose: Drainage mill
- Type: Smock mill
- Storeys: Two storey smock
- Base storeys: low brick base
- Smock sides: Eight sides
- No. of sails: Four sails
- Type of sails: Common sails
- Windshaft: Cast iron
- Winding: Tailpole and winch
- Type of pump: Archimedes screw

De Balkendsterpoldermolen is a smock mill in Alde Leie, Friesland, Netherlands which was built in 1844. The mill has been restored to working order and is designated as being held in reserve. It is listed as a Rijksmonument.

== History ==
The mill was built in 1844 to drain the Balkendsterpolder. In 1911, alterations were made to enable the pumping of water into, or out of, the polder. The mill was restored in 1970 by millwright De Roos of Leeuwarden, Friesland. It was sold to Stichting De Fryske Mole on 19 June 1980, becoming the 25th mill owned by that organisation. A further restoration in 1988 was carried out by millwright Tacoma of Stiens, Friesland. Circa 1990, the ability of the mill to pump water into the polder was removed. The ability to pump water in a circuit for demonstration purposes was facilitated. In 2006, the mill was designated as being held in reserve, capable of being worked in earnest should the need arise. The mill is listed as a Rijksmonument, №24539.

== Description ==
De Balkendsterpoldermolen is what the Dutch describe as a Grondzeiler. It is a two storey smock mill on a low brick base. There is no stage, the sails reaching almost to ground level. The mill is winded by tailpole and winch. The smock and cap are thatched. The sails are Common sails. They have a span of 12.64 metres (41 ft 6 in). The sails are carried on a cast iron windshaft, which was cast by Gieterij Hardinxveld of Hardinxveld-Giessendam, South Holland in 1987. It also carries the brake wheel which has 40 cogs. This drives the wallower (23 cogs) at the top of the upright shaft. At the bottom of the upright shaft there are two crown wheels. The upper crown wheel, which has 33 cogs drives an Archimedes' screw via a crown wheel. The lower crown wheel, which has 27 cogs is carried on the axle of an Archimedes' screw, which is used to drain the polder. The axle of the screw is 37 centimetres (1 ft 3 in) in diameter and 4.50 metres (14 ft 9 in) long. The screw is 90 centimetres (2 ft 11 in) in diameter. It is inclined at 24°. Each revolution of the screw lifts 218 litres (48 imp gal) of water.

== Public access ==
De Balkendsterpoldermolen is open to the public by appointment or whenever it is working.
