= Hijum =

- Village
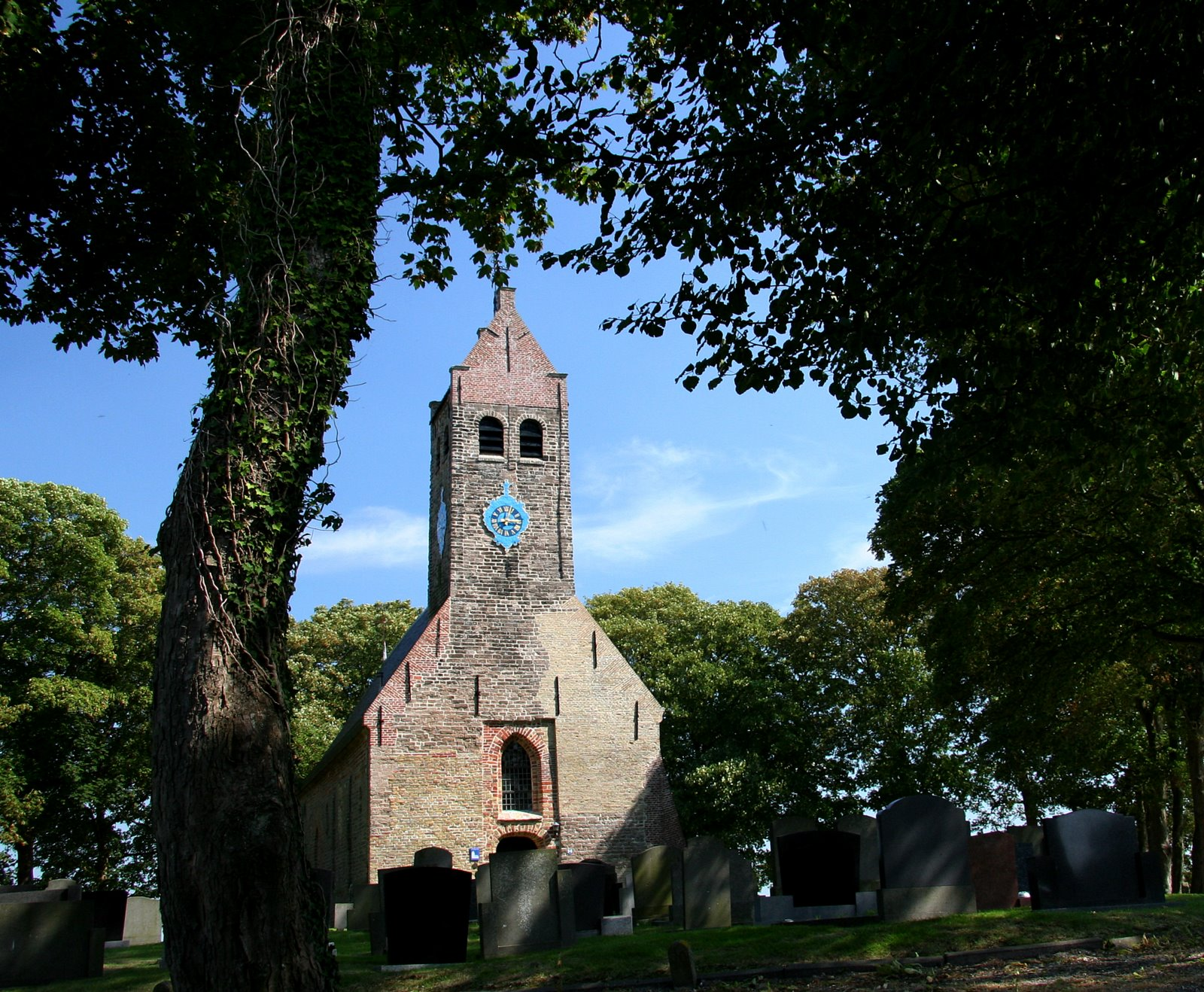
- St Nicholas' Church

- Flag Coat of arms

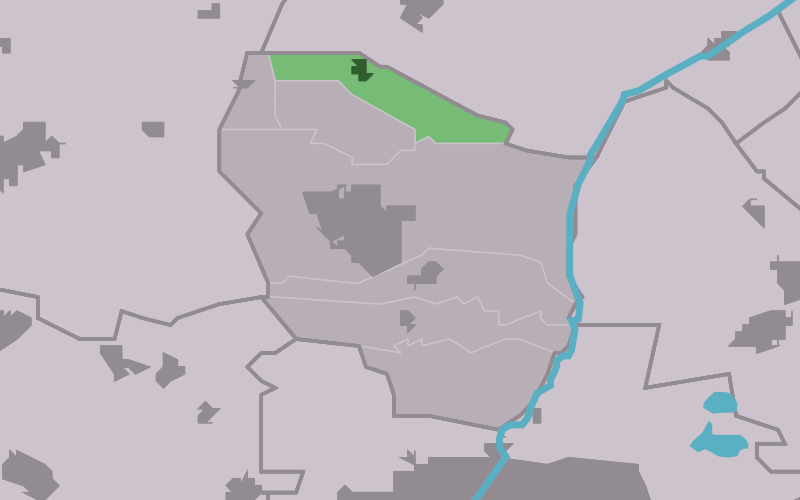
- Location in Leeuwarderadeel municipality

- Location in the Netherlands Hijum (Netherlands)
- Country: Netherlands
- Province: Friesland
- Municipality: Leeuwarden

Area
  - Total: 3.67 km^{2} (1.42 sq mi)
- Elevation: 1.4 m (4.6 ft)

Population (2021)
  - Total: 395
  - Density: 108/km^{2} (279/sq mi)
- Time zone: UTC+1 (CET)
  - Summer (DST): UTC+2 (CEST)
- Postal code: 9054
- Dialing code: 0518

Hijum is a village in Leeuwarden municipality in the province of Friesland, the Netherlands. It had a population of around 385 in January 2017.

== History ==
It was first mentioned in 1431 as Hehem. The name could mean "the settlement of Haie (person)". Hijum is a terp (artificial living mound) village with a radial structure which developed near the Middelzee. Around 1900, the terp was excavated, with the exception of the church. The Dutch Reformed church and tower were built in the 12th century, and were restored in 1976.

In 1840, Hijum was home to 310 people. Hijum used to have a railway station between 1901 and 1940.

Before 2018, the village was part of the Leeuwarderadeel municipality.

== Gallery ==
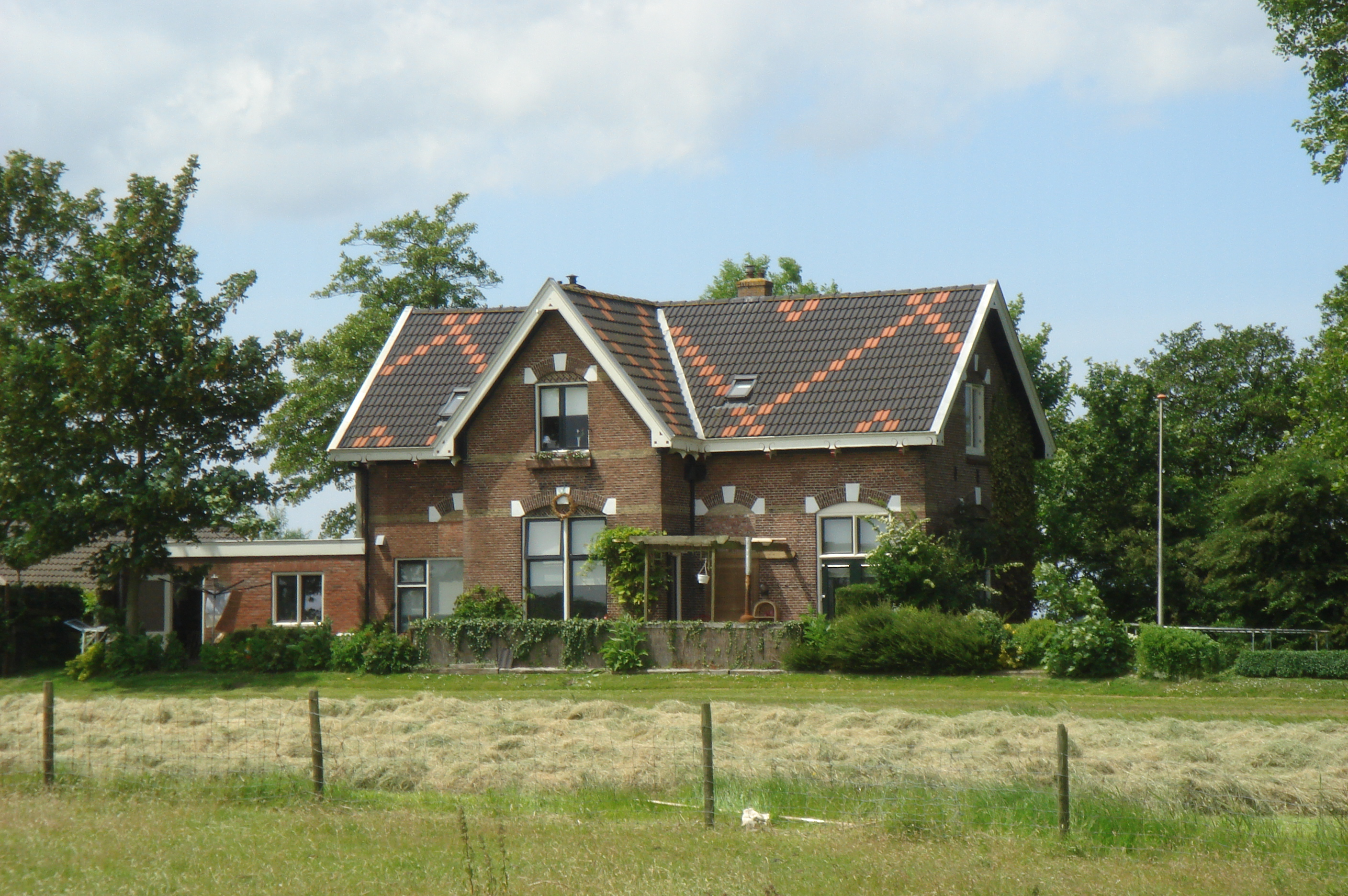
Former railway station Hijum

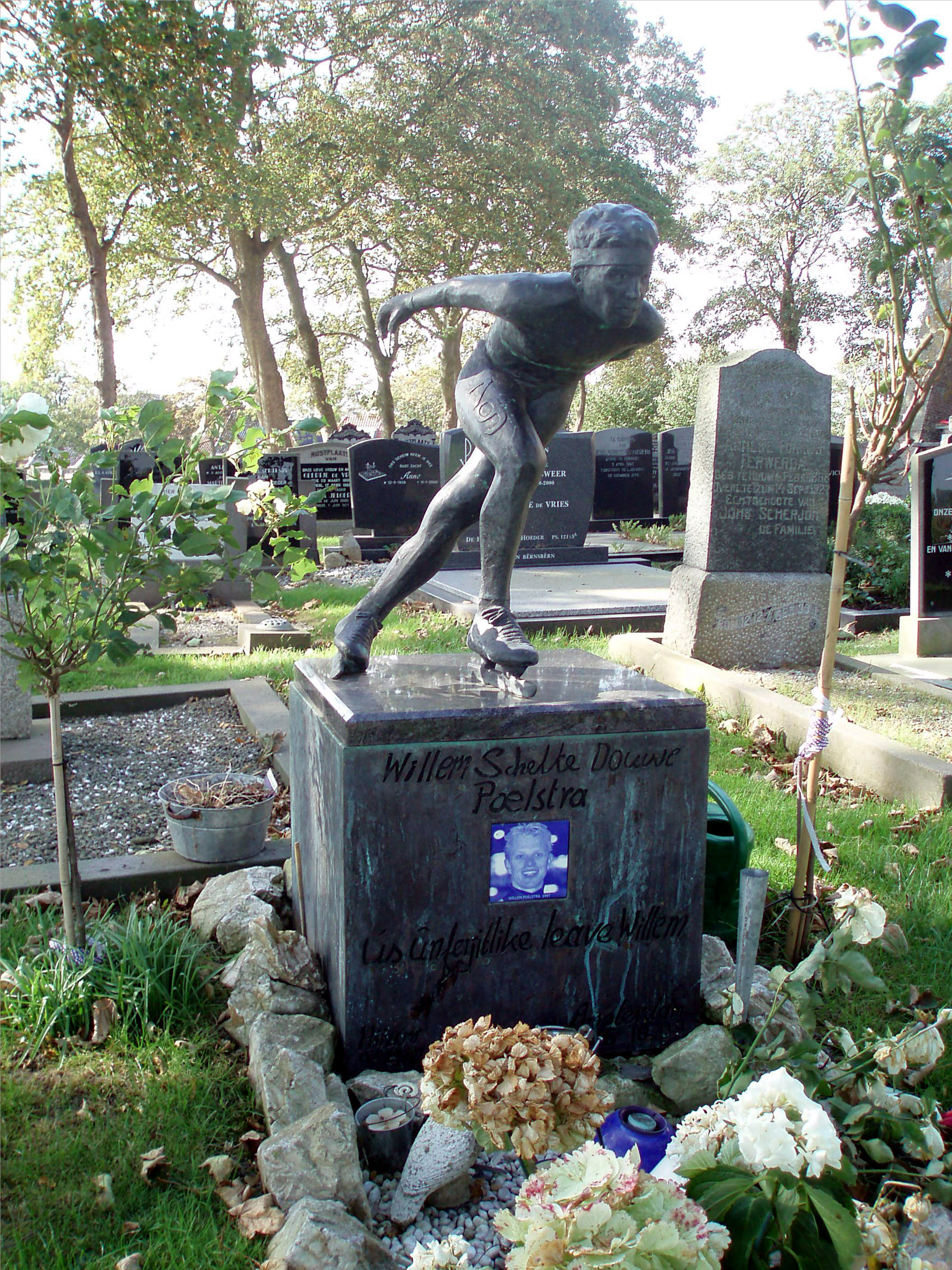
Grave of marathon speed skater Willem Poelstra
