= Alde Leie =

- Village
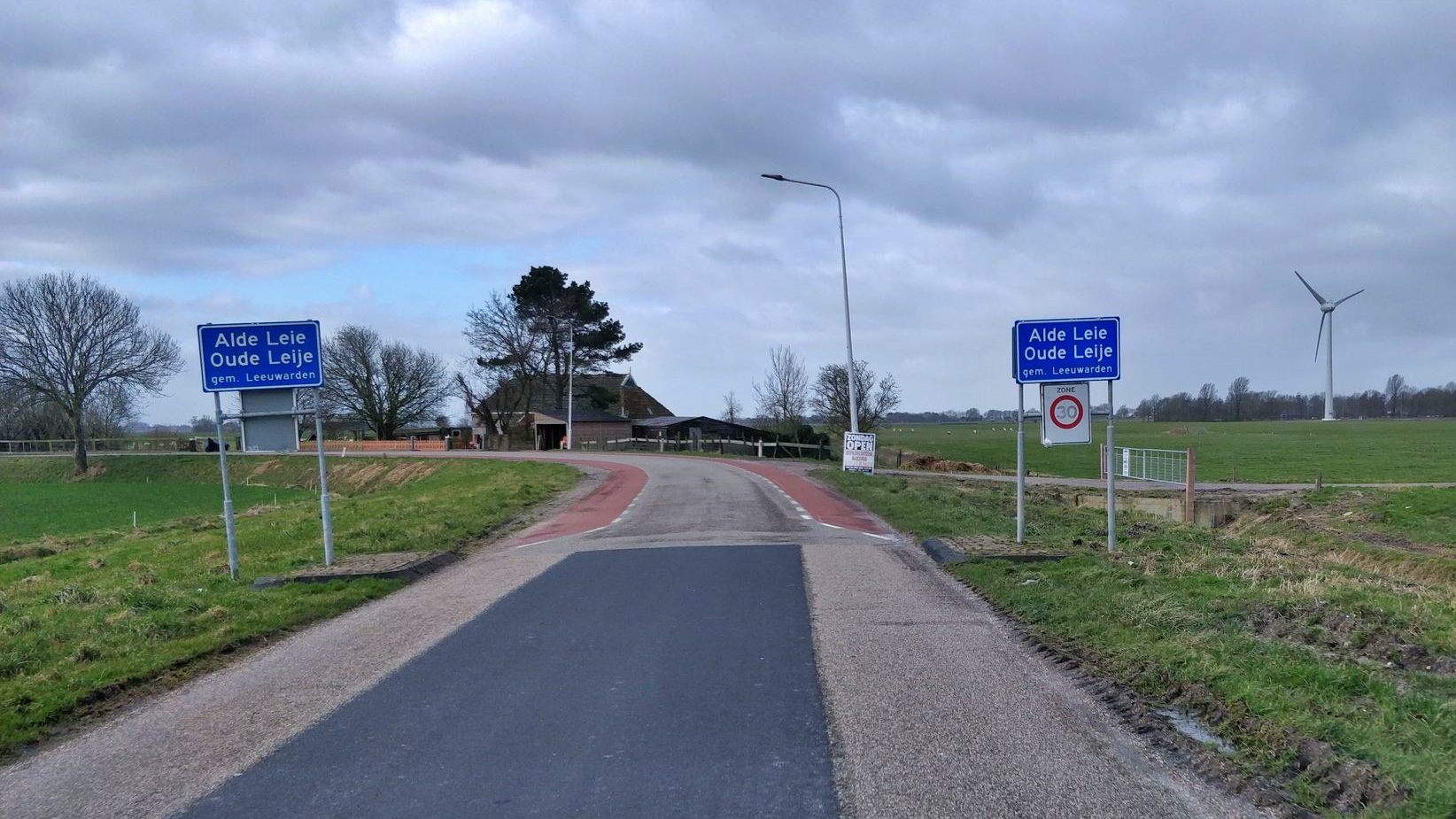
- Alde Leie

- Flag Coat of arms

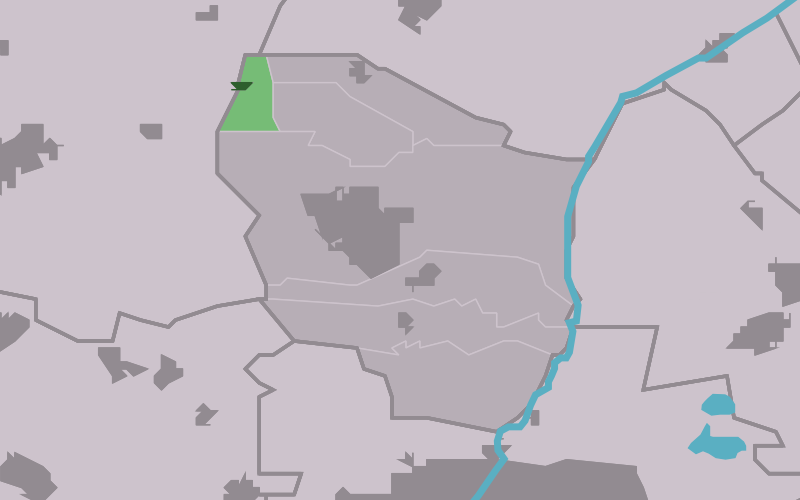
- Location in former Leeuwarderadeel municipality

- Location in the Netherlands Alde Leie (Netherlands)
- Country: Netherlands
- Province: Friesland
- Municipalities: Leeuwarden Waadhoeke

Area
  - Total: 1.26 km^{2} (0.49 sq mi)
- Elevation: 1.3 m (4.3 ft)

Population (2021)
  - Total: 235
  - Density: 187/km^{2} (483/sq mi)
- Time zone: UTC+1 (CET)
  - Summer (DST): UTC+2 (CEST)
- Postal code: 9078
- Dialing code: 0518

Alde Leie (Dutch: Oude Leije) is a village in the municipality of Leeuwarden, (province of Friesland) in the Netherlands. It had a population of around 255 in January 2017. A small part of the village lies within the municipality Waadhoeke.

It is on the route of the Elfstedentocht. There is a windmill in the vicinity, De Balkendsterpoldermolen.

== History ==
The village was first mentioned in 1466 as "op ter Leya", which means an old dug canal. Alde Leie developed as a dike village along the Middelzee. In 1840, it was home to 339 people. In 1868, a church was built.

Before 2018, the village was part of the Leeuwarderadeel municipality.

== Gallery ==
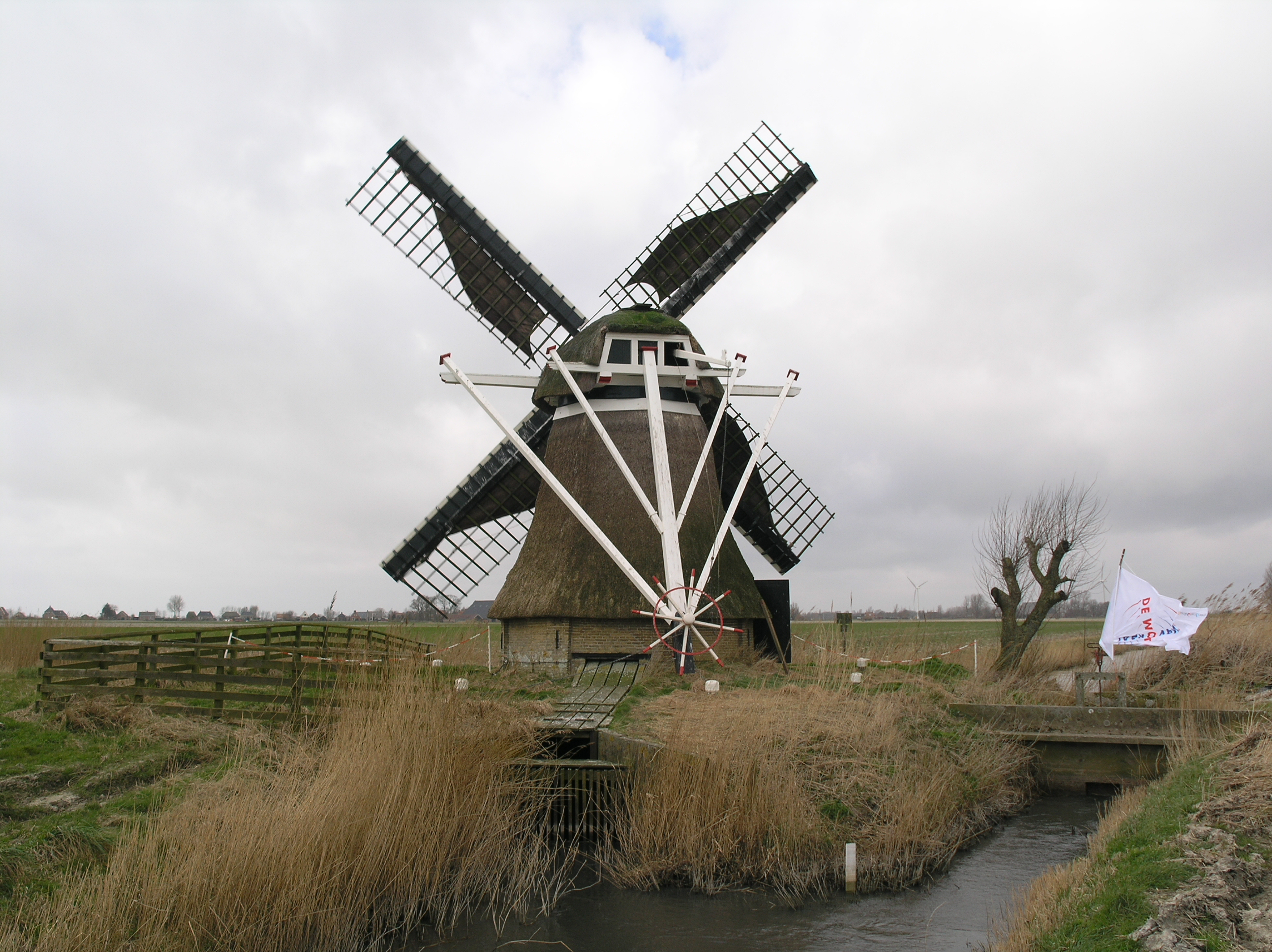
Balkendster windmill

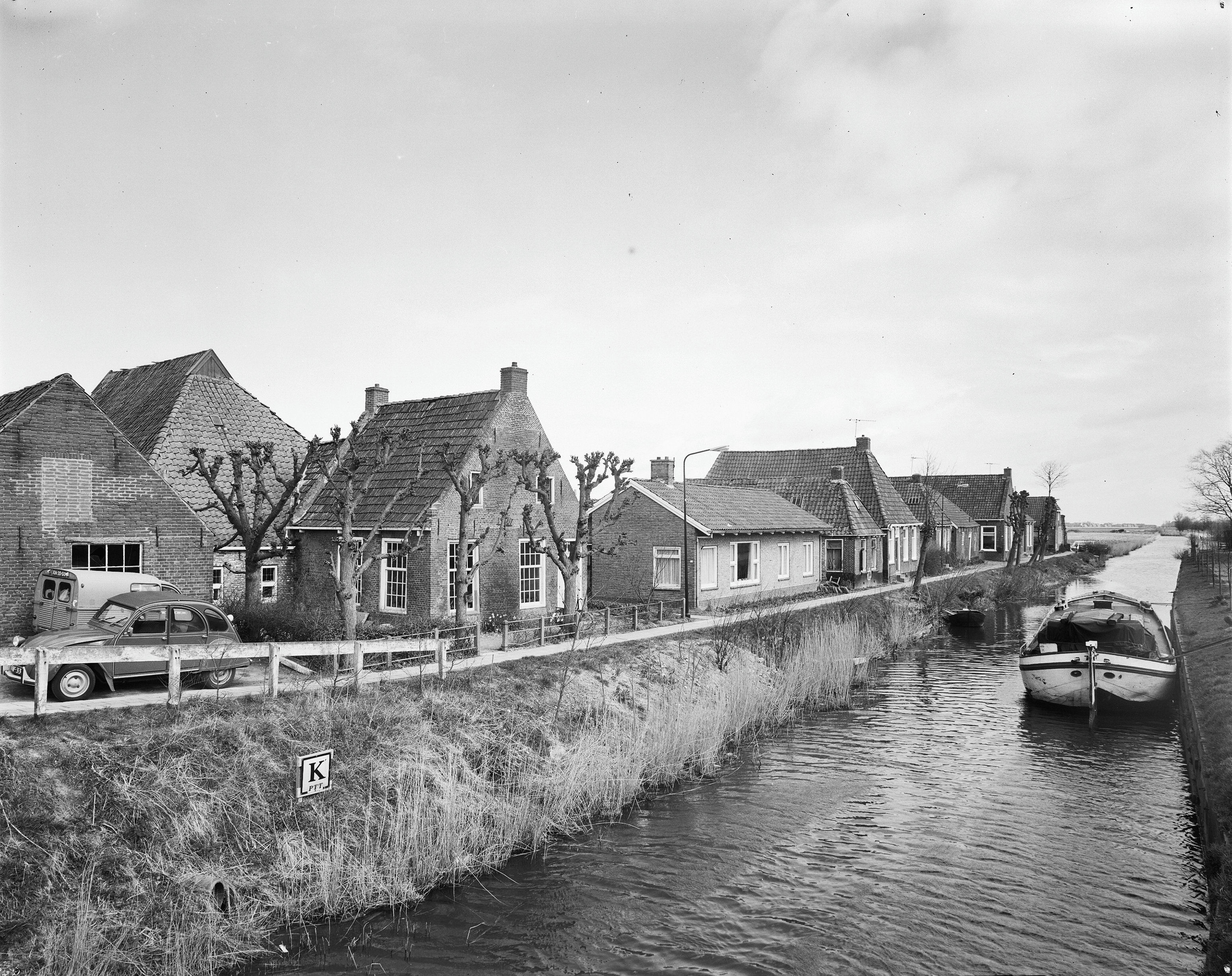
View along the canal

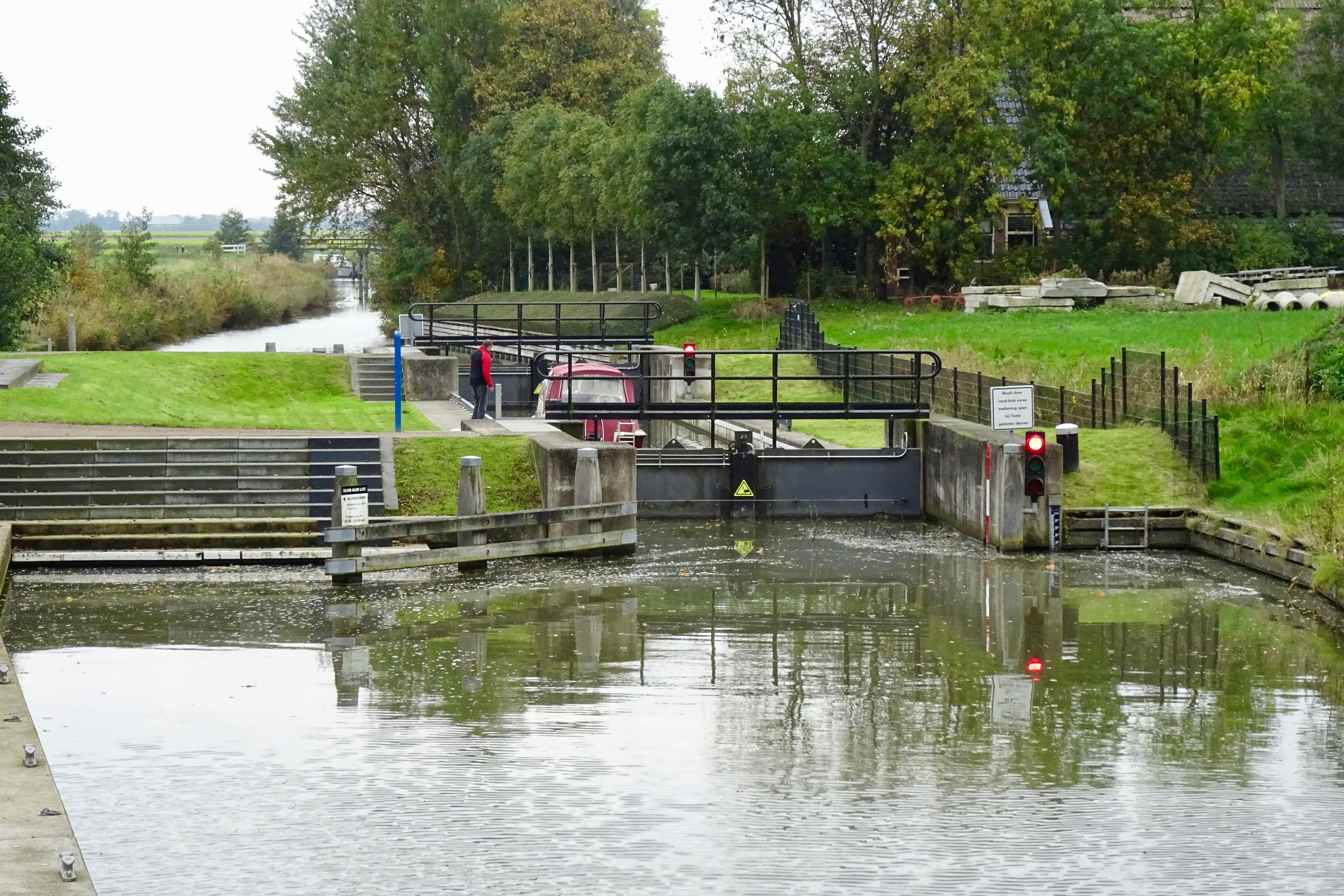
Lock in Alde Leie
