= Babuurstermolen =

Smock mill in the Netherlands

De Babuurstermolen, Tjerkwerd
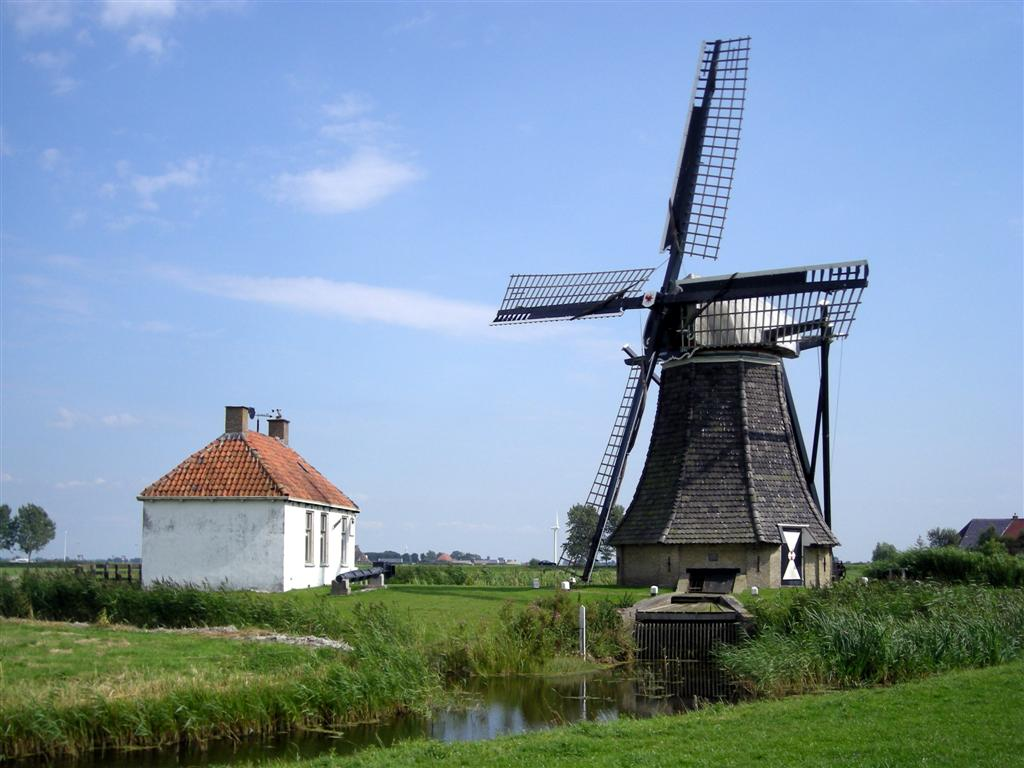
- De Babuurstermolen, August 2007.

Origin
- Mill name: De Babuurstermolen
- Mill location: Baburen 9, 8765 LS, Tjerkwerd
- Coordinates: 53°03′00″N 5°29′57″E
- Operator(s): Stichting De Fryske Mole
- Year built: 1882

Information
- Purpose: Drainage mill
- Type: Smock mill
- Storeys: Two storey smock
- Base storeys: One storey base
- Smock sides: Eight sides
- No. of sails: Four sails
- Type of sails: Common sails
- Windshaft: Cast iron
- Winding: Tailpole and winch
- Type of pump: Archimedes' screw

De Babuurstermolen is a smock mill in Tjerkwerd, Friesland, Netherlands which was built in 1882 and has been restored to working order. Designated as being in reserve, it is listed as a Rijksmonument.

== History ==
De Babuurstermolen was built in 1882 by millwright Gerben van Wierum of Janum, Friesland at a cost of ƒ7,850 or ƒ8,750. It drained the 1,400 pondemaat (510 ha; 1,300 acres) Exmoarsterheim polder. The mill was set to work for the first time on 30 November 1882. Another mill was built nearby at the same time. It burnt down in 1913 and was not rebuilt.

In 1930, the wooden windshaft was replaced by a cast-iron one. One of the wooden sailstocks broke in the autumn on 1945. The mill was worked on two sails until 1948 when a new pair of sails were fitted by the firm Hubert of Sneek, Friesland. In 1963, the wooden Archimedes' screw was replaced by a steel one. The work was carried out by Bouwbedrijf Van Zuiden of Tjerkwerd. In September 1964, a sailstock broke, and the mill ran with two sails until 1965, when a new pair of sails were fitted nu millwright Christiaan Bremer of Adorp, Groningen. The mill was working until 1990, when a new pumping station took over its work. The mill was sold to Stichting De Fryske Mole on 7 February, the 45th mill bought by that organisation. In 2006, the mill was officially designated as being held in reserve. As of 2014, the mill is under restoration. It is listed as a Rijksmonument, №39431.

== Description ==
De Babuurstermolen is what the Dutch describe as a Grondzeiler. It is a two-storey smock mill on a single-storey base. There is no stage, the sails reaching almost to ground level. The mill is winded by tailpole and winch. The smock is clad in horizontal boards, overlaid with shingles, whilst the cap has vertical boards covered with zinc sheets. The sails are Common sails. They have a span of 20.00 metres (65 ft 7 in). The sails are carried on a cast iron windshaft, which was cast by the IJzergieterij J M de Muinck Keizer, Martenshoek, Groningen in 1903. The windshaft carries the brake wheel which has 59 cogs. This drives the wallower (33 cogs) at the top of the upright shaft. At the bottom of the upright shaft there are two crown wheels The upper crown wheel, which has 43 cogs drives an Archimedes' screw via a crown wheel. The lower crown wheel, which has 40 cogs is carried on the axle of an Archimedes' screw, which is used to drain the polder. The axle of the screw is 512 millimetres (1 ft 8 in) diameter and 6.15 metres (20 ft 2 in) long. The screw is 1.42 metres (4 ft 8 in) diameter. It is inclined at 23.5°. Each revolution of the screw lifts 858 litres (189 imp gal) of water.

== Public access ==
De Babuurstermolen is open on Wednesday and Saturdays from 13:00 to 16:30, or by appointment.
