= Tjerkwerd =

Tjerkwerd Tsjerkwert
- Village
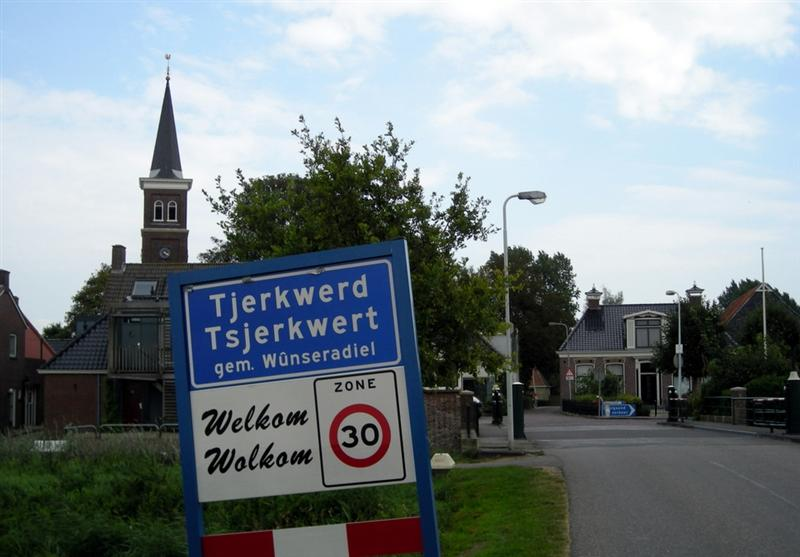

- Flag Coat of arms

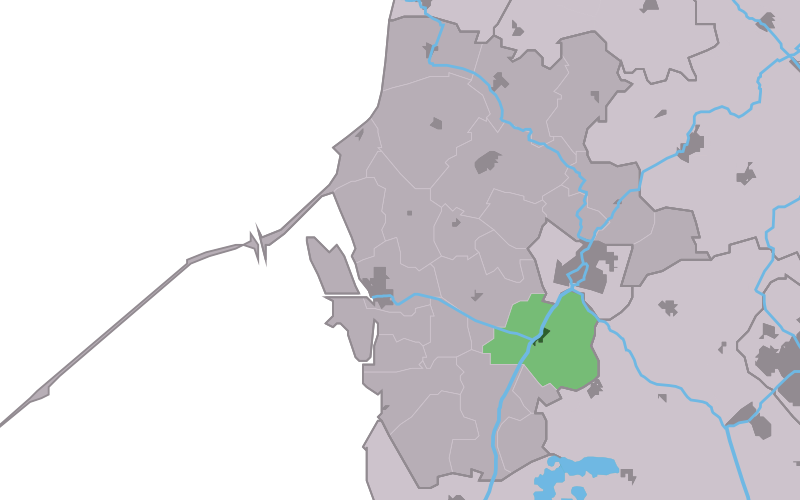
- Location in the former Wûnseradiel municipality

- Location in the Netherlands Tjerkwerd (Netherlands)
- Country: Netherlands
- Province: Friesland
- Municipality: Súdwest-Fryslân

Area
  - Total: 12.05 km^{2} (4.65 sq mi)
- Elevation: 0.0 m (0 ft)

Population (2021)
  - Total: 450
  - Density: 37/km^{2} (97/sq mi)
- Time zone: UTC+1 (CET)
  - Summer (DST): UTC+2 (CEST)
- Postal code: 8765
- Dialing code: 0515

Tjerkwerd (West Frisian: Tsjerkwert) is a village in Súdwest-Fryslân municipality in the province Friesland of the Netherlands. It had a population of 455 in January 2017.

There is a windmill in the village, De Babuurstermolen.

== History ==
The village was first mentioned in the 13th century as Kercwere, and means "terp with church". Tjerkwerd is a terp (artificial living hill) village with a radial structure.

The Dutch Reformed church was probably built in the 14th century. In 1888, it was extended and a new tower was constructed. The Walta State was a stins built at the end of the 15th century, and used to be owned by the Cammingha family. The estate was demolished around 1800. Watse van Cammingha died in 1688. Rixt van Donia, his widow, became the richest woman in Friesland at the time, and is buried in a large marble monument.

The polder mill De Babuurstermolen was built in 1882. It was in active service draining the excess water from the polder until 1990 when it was replaced by a pumping station. In 2006, it was re-designated as backup.

Tjerkwerd was home to 249 people in 1840. From 1850 onwards, a linear settlement developed along the Workumer Trekvaart. Before 2011, the village was part of the Wûnseradiel municipality. In 2015, the road to Tjerkwerd received an award for worst road of Friesland. The road was fixed by the municipality between 2016 and 2017.

== Gallery ==
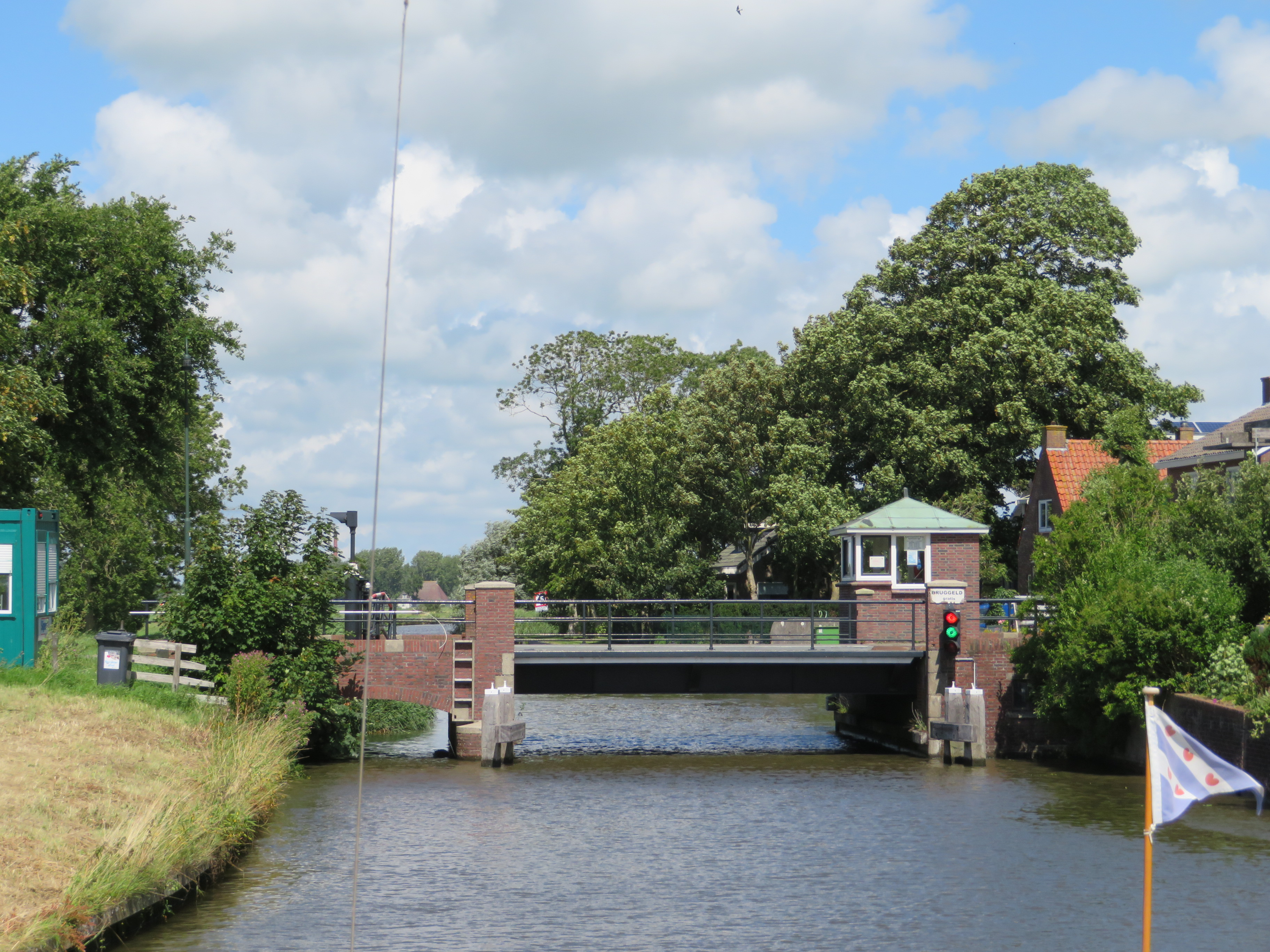
The bridge in Tjerkwerd

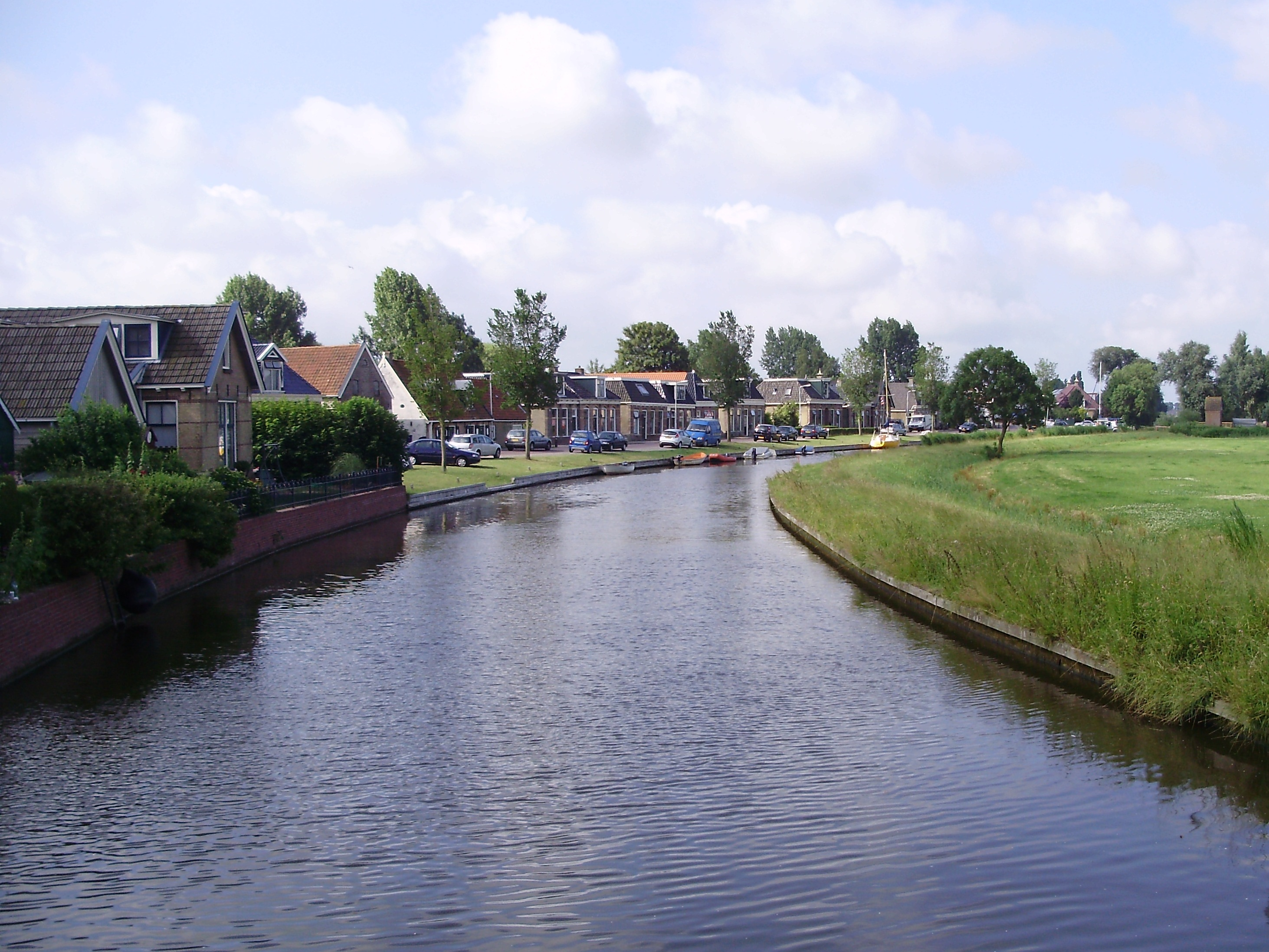
Canal view

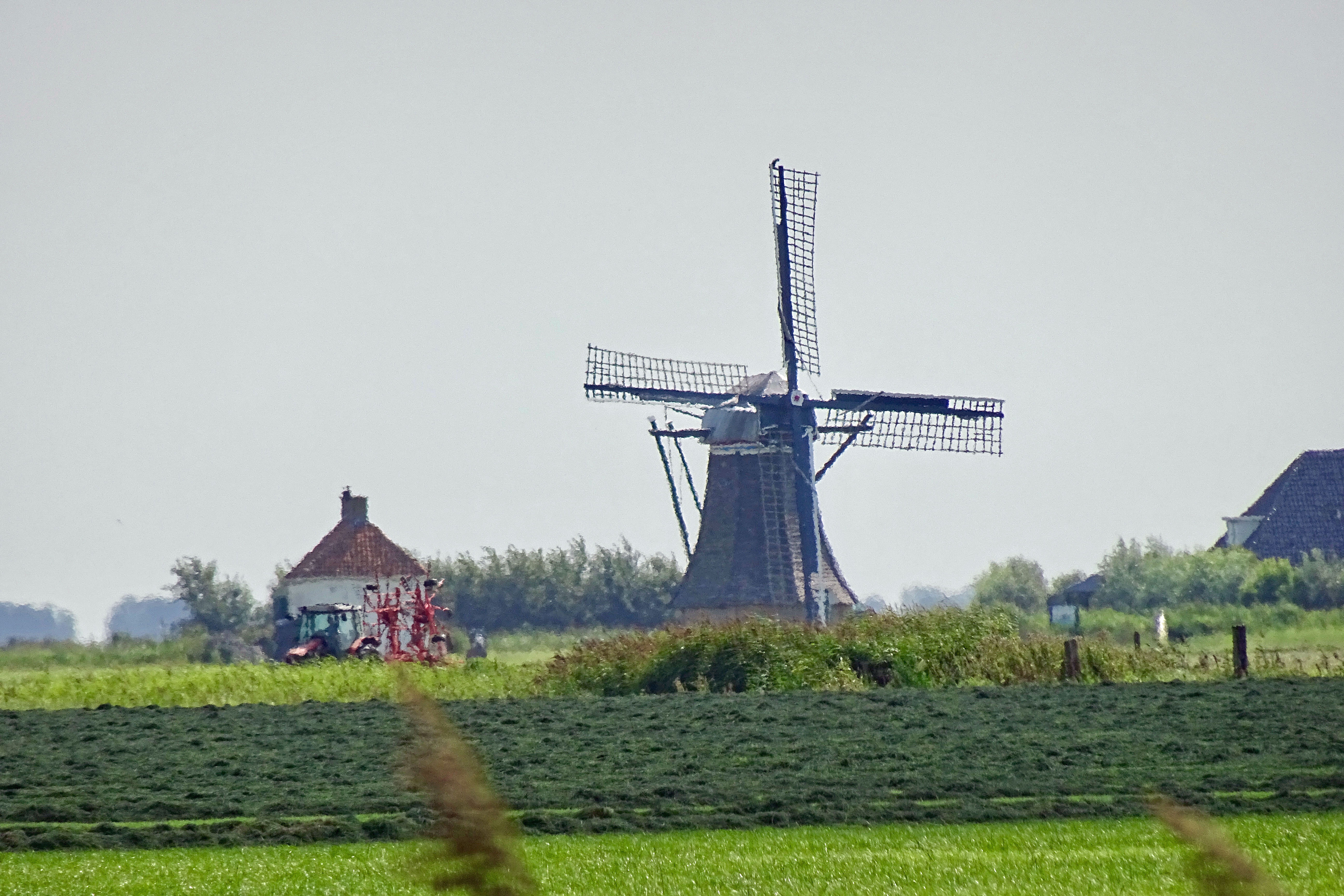
Babuurstermolen

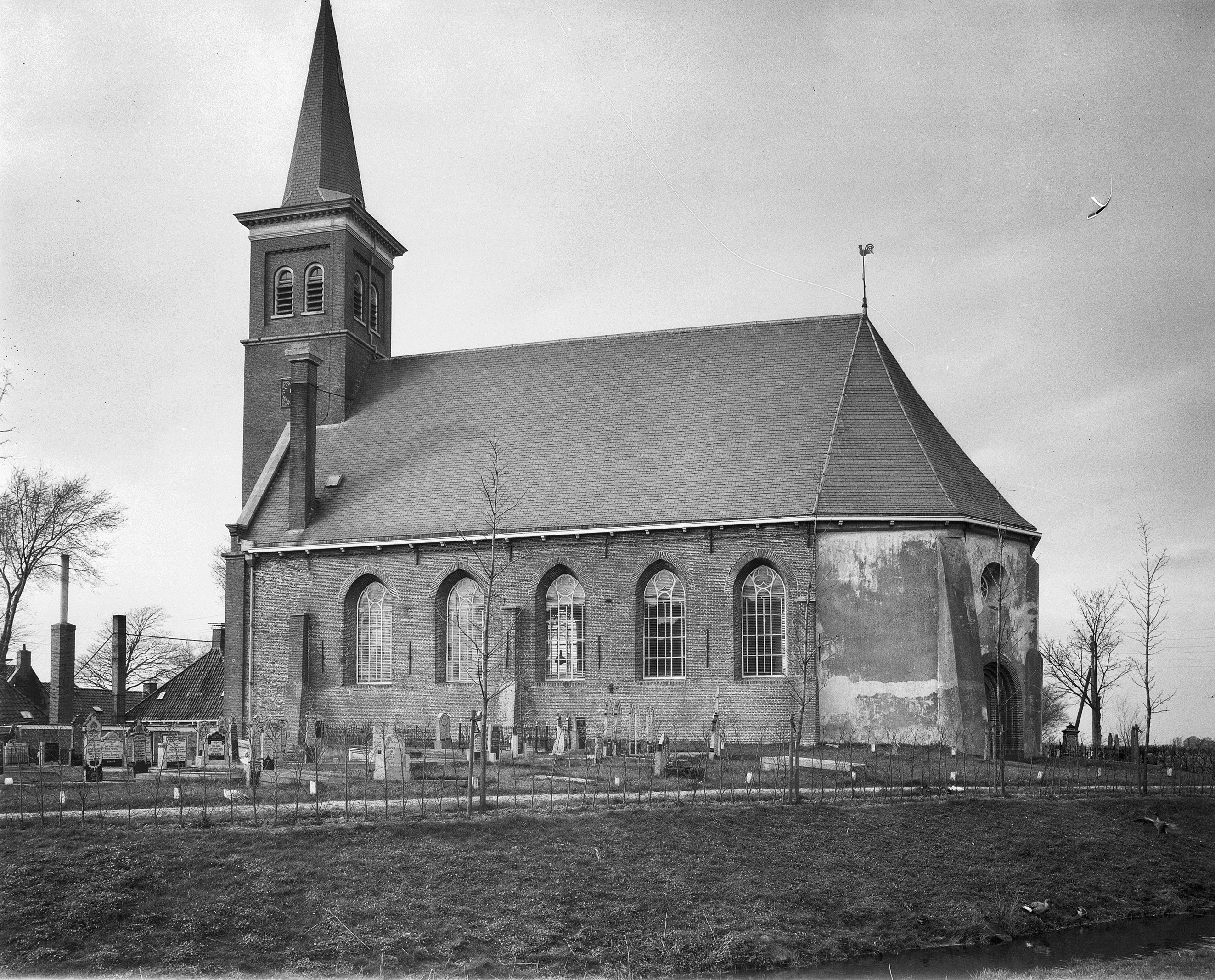
Church of Tjerkwerd
