= Leeuwarderadeel =

Leeuwarderadeel Ljouwerteradiel
- Municipality
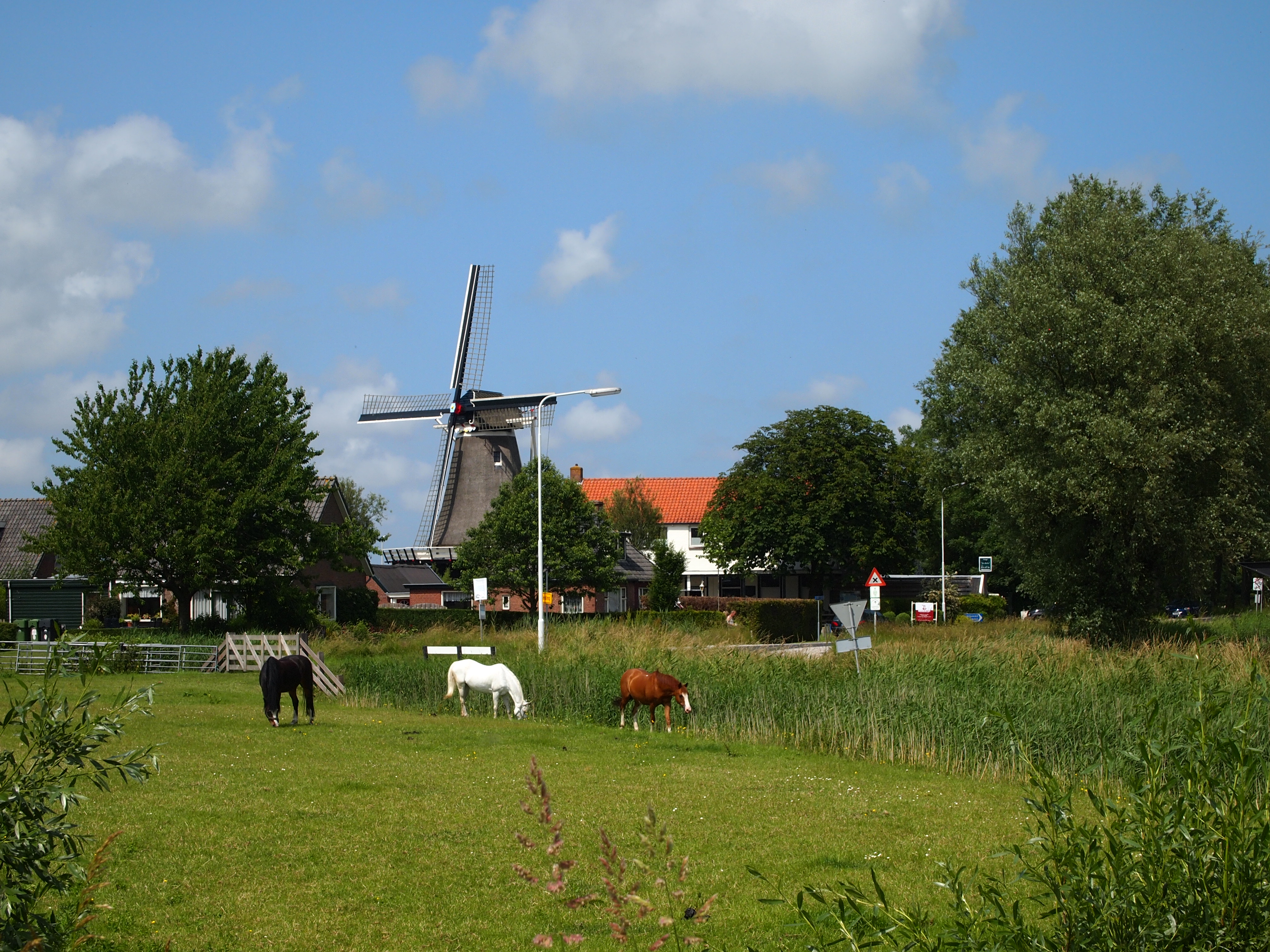
- Windmill in Leeuwarderadeel

- Flag Coat of arms

- Location in Friesland
- Coordinates: 53°16′N 5°46′E
- Country: Netherlands
- Province: Friesland
- Merged: 2018

Area
  - Total: 41.46 km^{2} (16.01 sq mi)
  - Land: 40.91 km^{2} (15.80 sq mi)
  - Water: 0.55 km^{2} (0.21 sq mi)
- Elevation: 1 m (3.3 ft)
- Highest elevation: 1.7 m (5.6 ft)
- Lowest elevation: 0.6 m (2.0 ft)

Population (January 2021)
  - Total: data missing
- Time zone: UTC+1 (CET)
  - Summer (DST): UTC+2 (CEST)
- Postcode: 9050–9057 9071–9072
- Area code: 0518, 058
- Website: www.leeuwarderadeel.nl

Leeuwarderadeel (Dutch: [leːuˈɑrdəraːˌdeːl]; West Frisian: Ljouwerteradiel [ˈljɔu(ə)təraˌdiəl]) is a former municipality in northern Netherlands. Its capital was Stiens.

== History ==
On 1 January 2018, it merged with the municipality of Leeuwarden.

== Population centres ==
- Bartlehiem
- Britsum
- Cornjum
- Finkum
- Hijum
- Jelsum
- Oude Leije
- Stiens

=== Topography ===
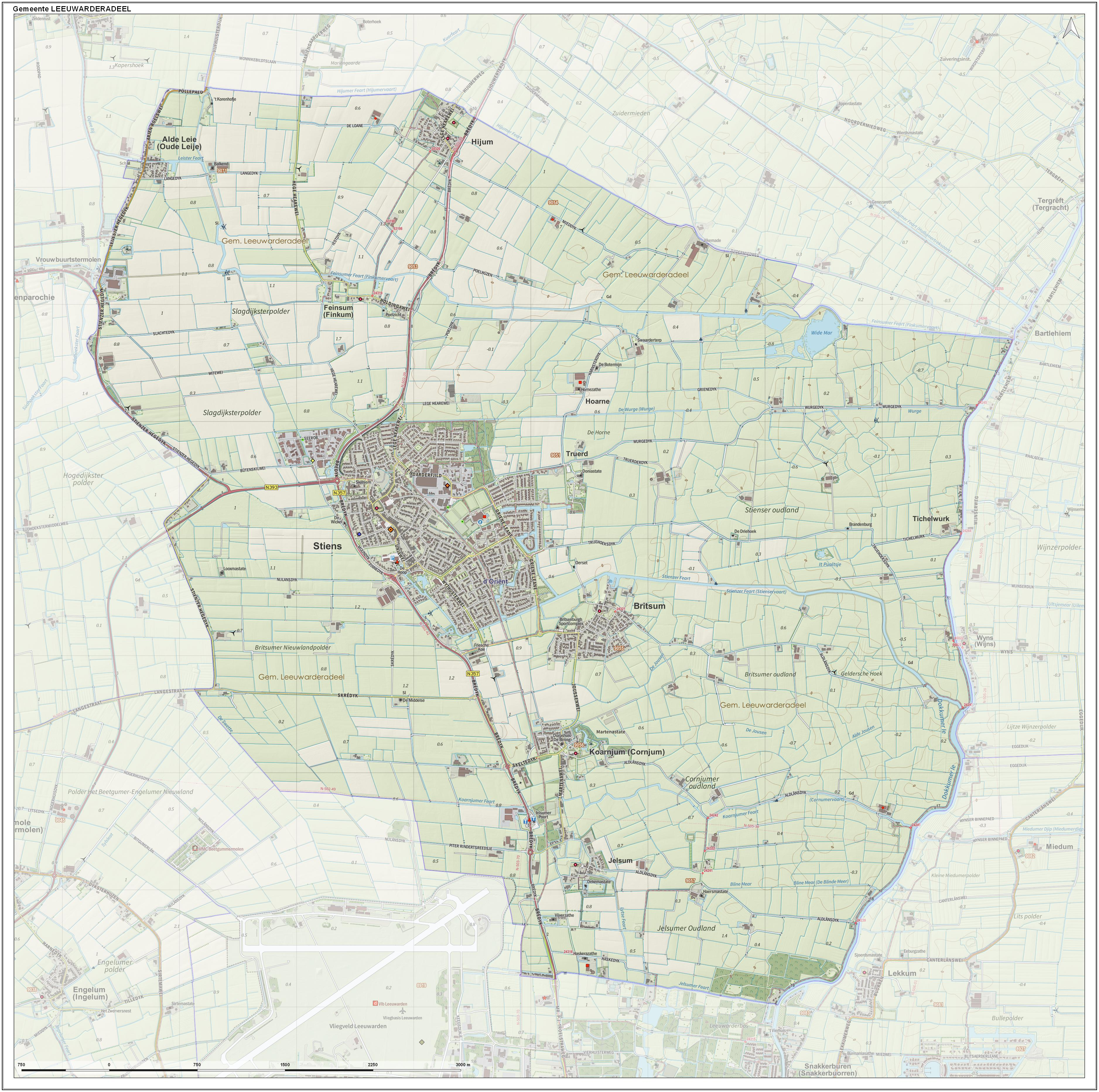

Dutch Topographic map of the municipality of Leeuwarderadeel, June 2015.

== Bartlehiem ==
The hamlet of Bartlehiem is partially in Leeuwarderadeel partially in Ferwerderadiel and partially in Tytsjerksteradiel.
