= Feinsum =

- Village
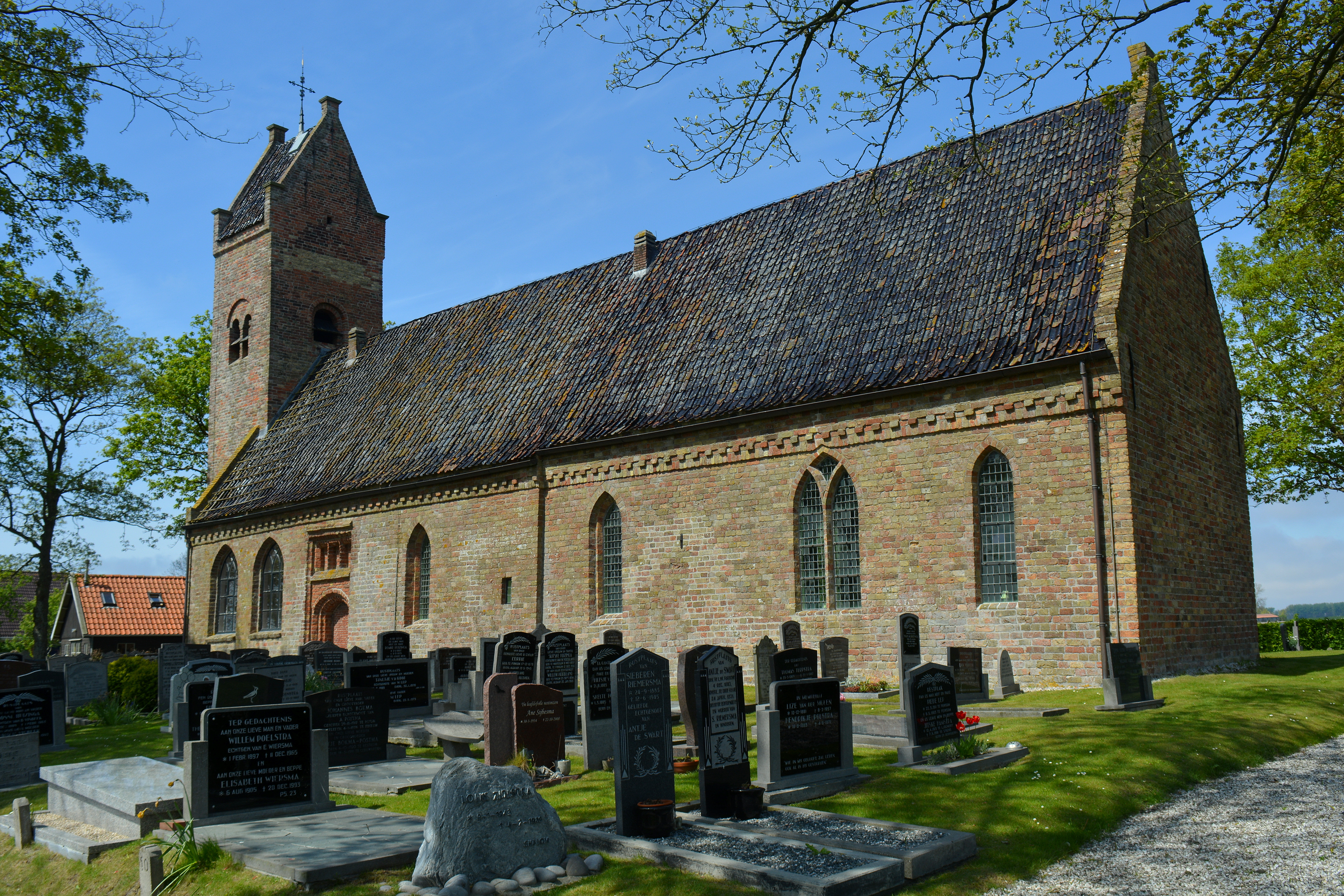
- St Vitus' Church

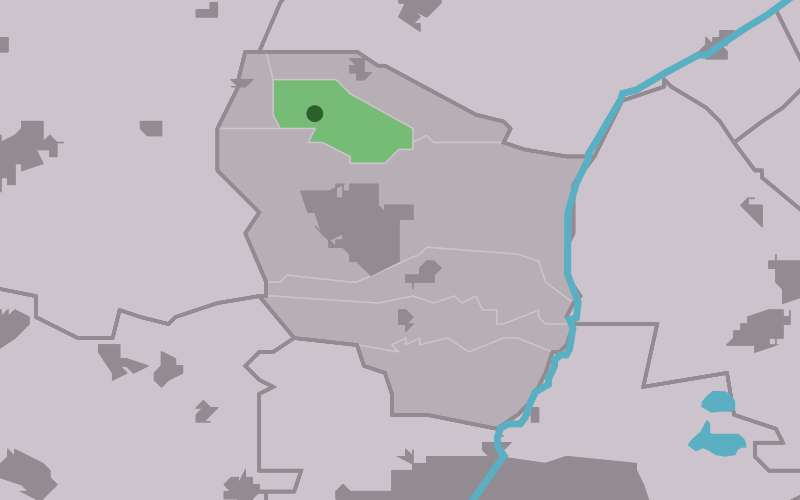
- Location in Leeuwarderadeel municipality

- Location in the Netherlands Feinsum (Netherlands)
- Country: Netherlands
- Province: Friesland
- Municipality: Leeuwarden

Area
  - Total: 3.33 km^{2} (1.29 sq mi)
- Elevation: 0.4 m (1.3 ft)

Population (2021)
  - Total: 160
  - Density: 48/km^{2} (120/sq mi)
- Time zone: UTC+1 (CET)
  - Summer (DST): UTC+2 (CEST)
- Postal code: 9053
- Dialing code: 058

Feinsum (Dutch: Finkum) is a village in Leeuwarden municipality in the province of Friesland, the Netherlands. It had a population of around 165 in January 2017.

There is a restored windmill, the Slagdijkstermolen.

== History ==
The village was first mentioned in 1335 as Finckum. The etymology is unclear. Feinsum is a very old terp (artificial living mound) village which probably had its origins in the beginning of our era, and has one of the oldest dikes of the Netherlands. There used to be an outpost of the monastery Mariëngaarde in Feinsum.

The Dutch Reformed church dates from the 13th century and was restored between 1962 and 1964. In 1840, Feinsum was home to 227 people.

Before 2018, the village was part of the Leeuwarderadeel municipality.

== Gallery ==
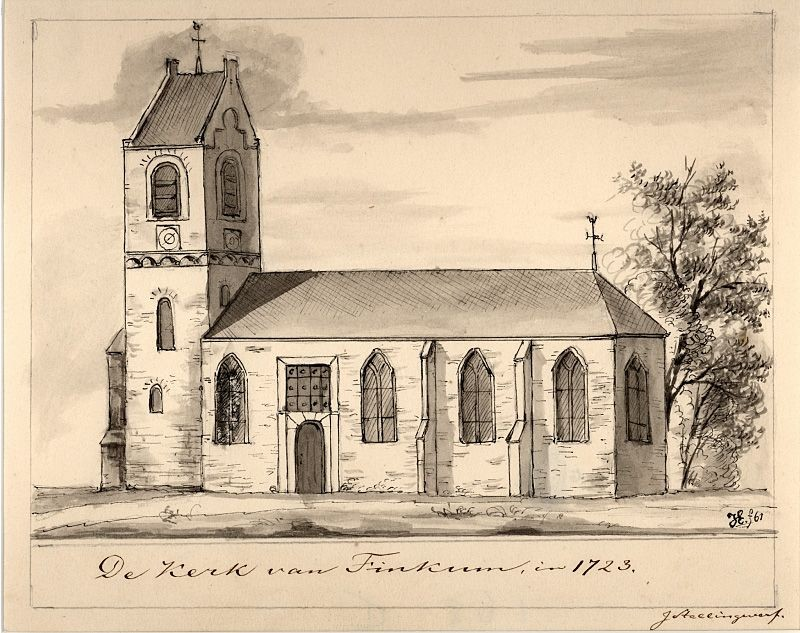
Feinsum church, 1723

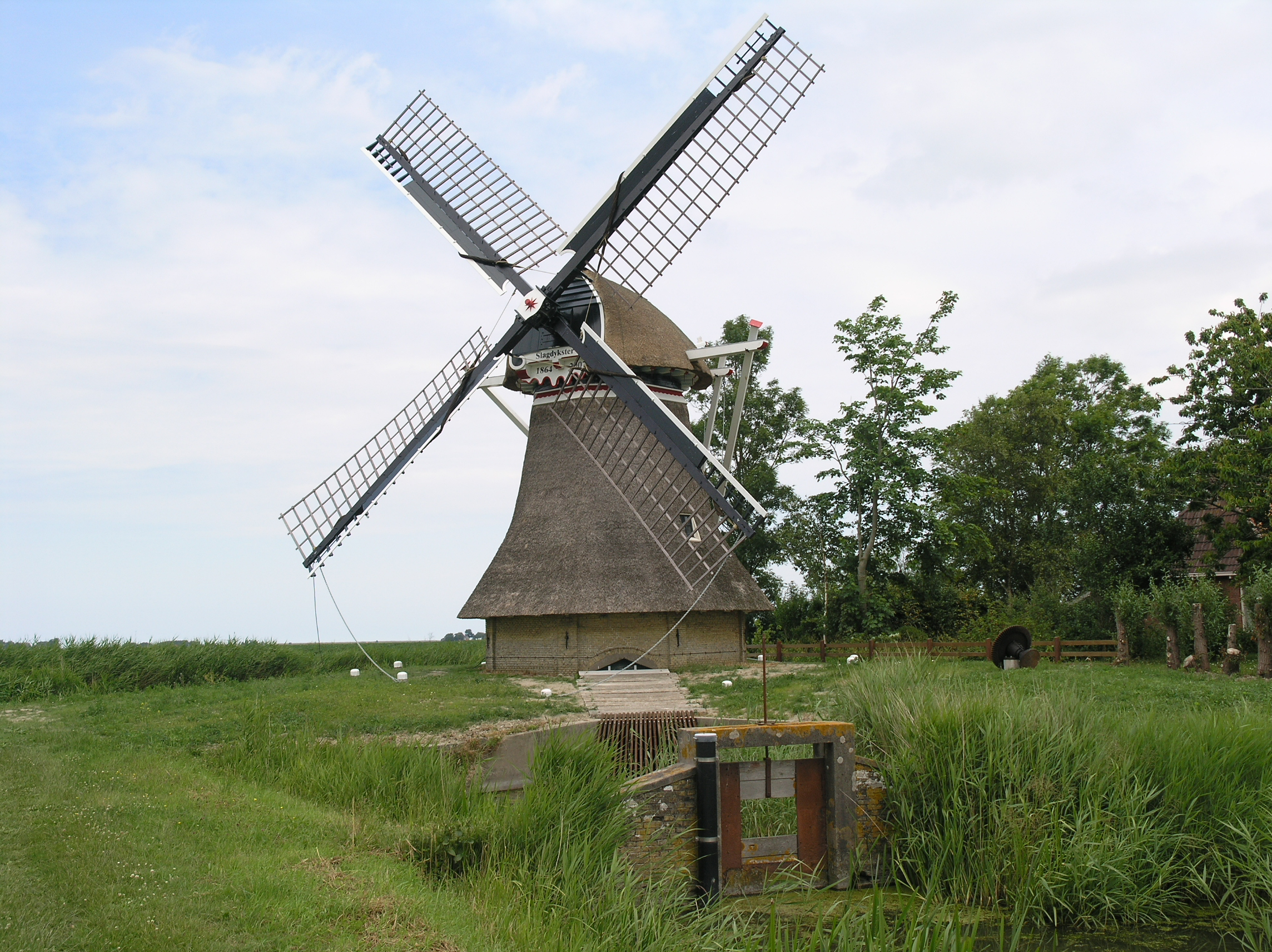
Slagdijkstermolen

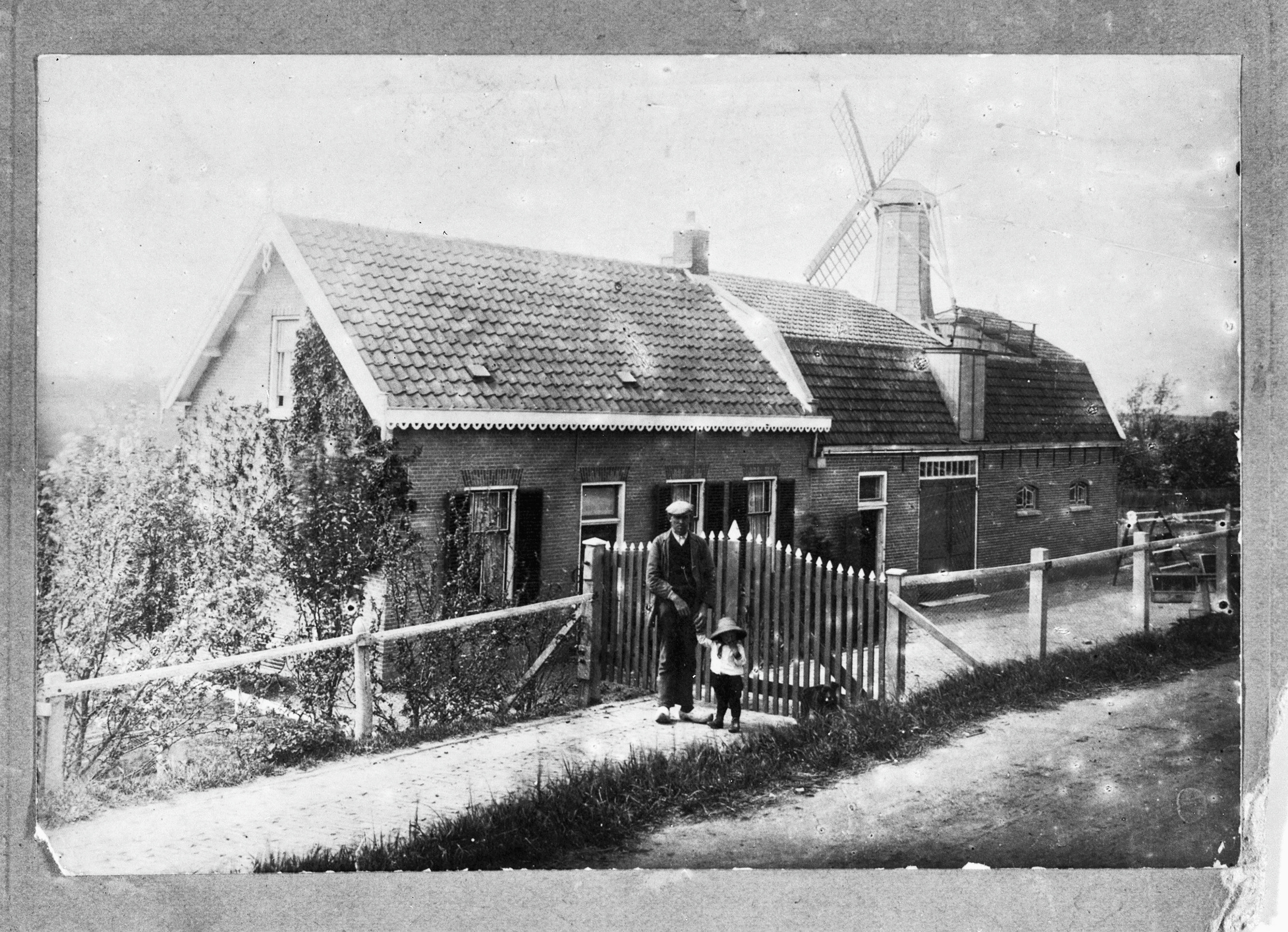
House in Finkum (1950–1952)

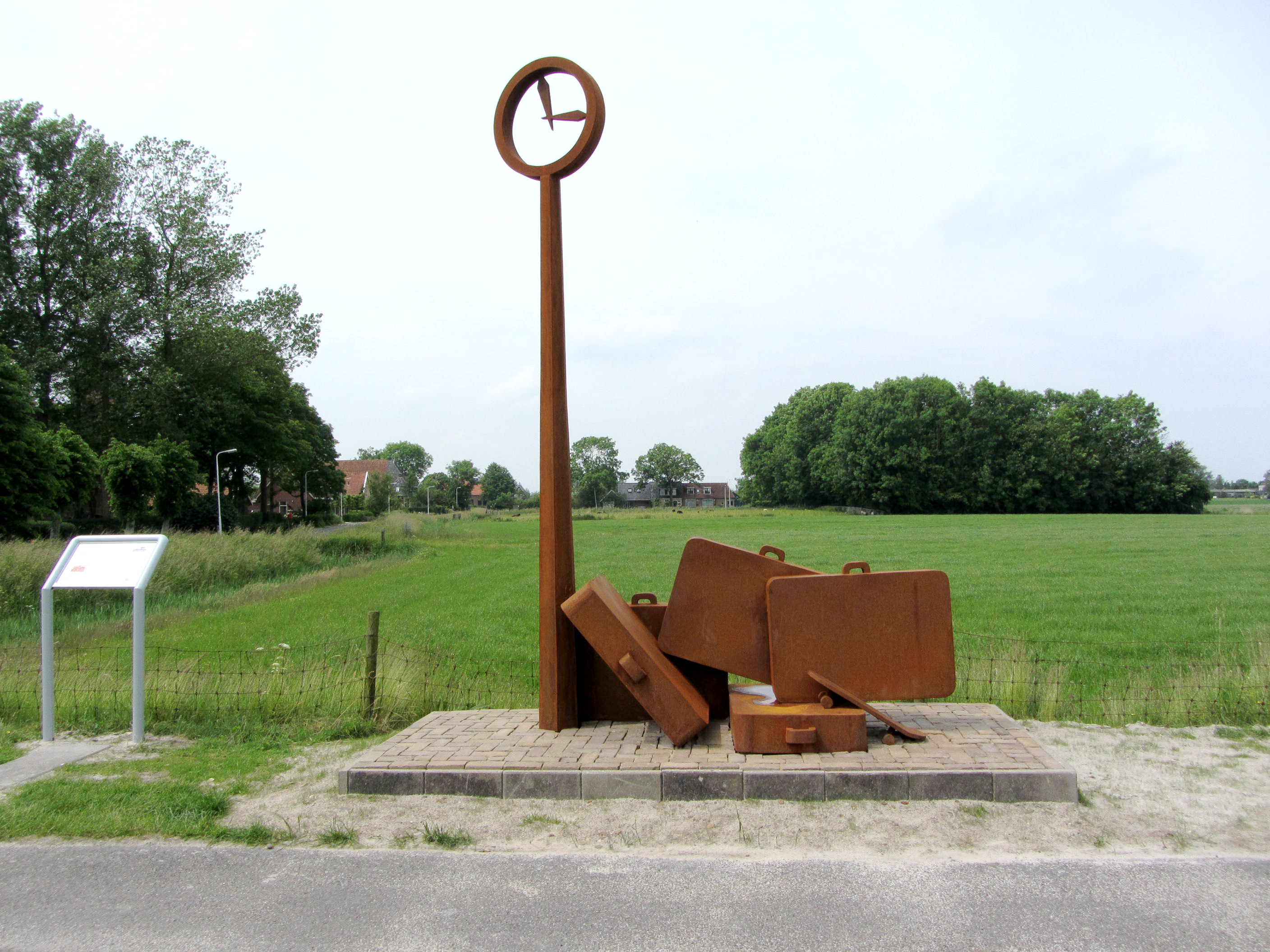
Time traveller statue
