= Radio Centraal (Weststellingwerf) =

Dutch radio station

- Noordwolde; Netherlands
- Frequencies: 107.4 MHz; 105 MHz

History
- First air date: February 27, 1981

Radio Centraal is a local radio station, located in Noordwolde (municipality of Weststellingwerf) in the Netherlands. The first official program of Radio Central was aired on 27 February 1981, and is therewith one of the oldest local broadcasters in the Netherlands. From the start, they used strip programming on Saturday and Sunday, to increase the audience measurement. Radio Central has its focus on local news. In the first years of their existence they were a pirate radio station, and broadcast without a valid license. In 1982 they started with the procedures to get hold on a valid license, but this took several years and had only been completed in 1988.

The local radiostation started very small, but has been grown considerably over the years and now they are broadcasting in municipality of Westellingwerf, municipality of Heerenveen and the municipality of the Fryske Marren. Radio Centraal can be heard through two frequencies in ether; 107.4 FM and 105, in respectively Noordwolde and Wolvega and surroundings. On cable, it is possible to receive their signal via 104.1FM.
