= Windlust, Noordwolde =

Windmill in Noordwolde, Netherlands

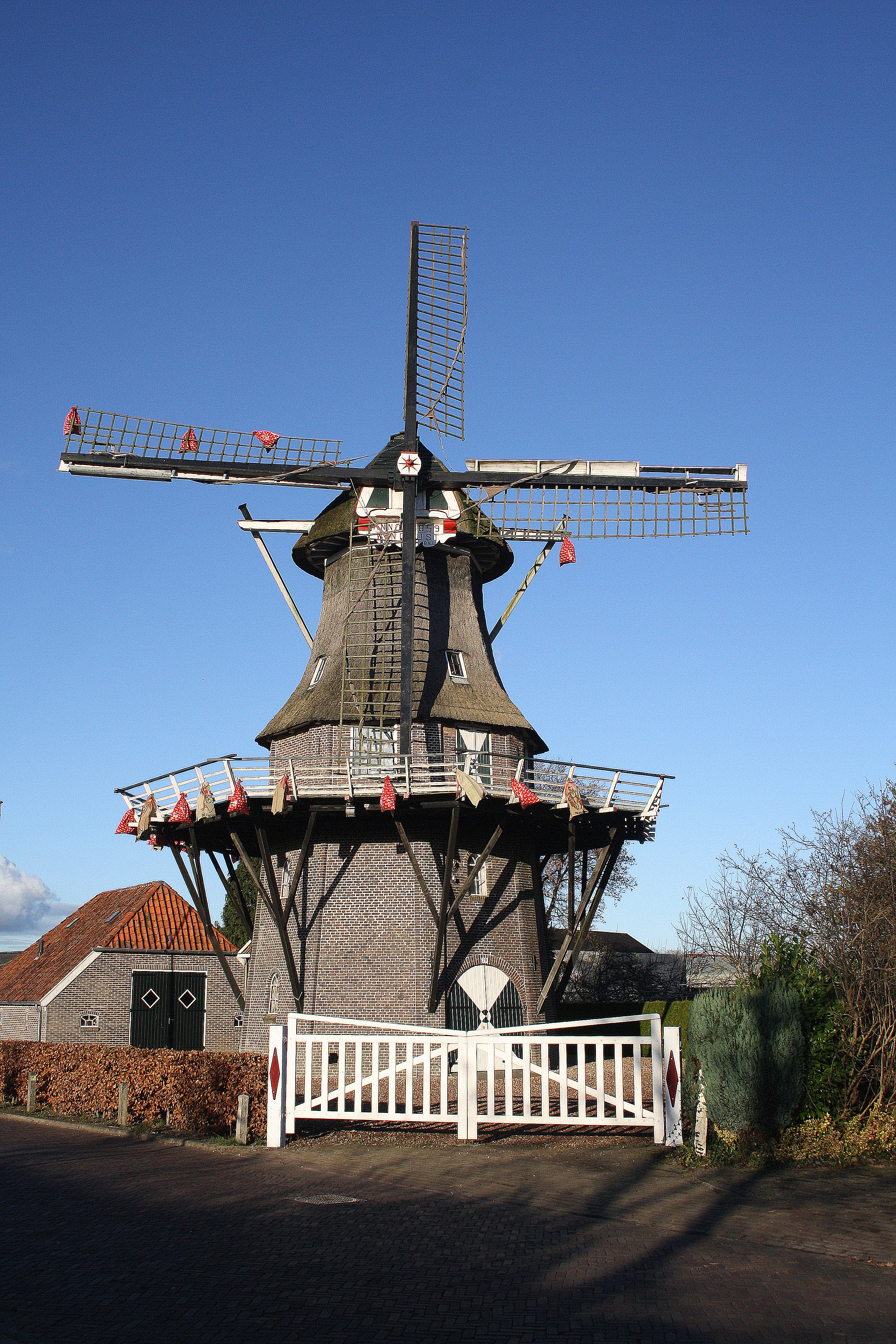
- Windlust, November 2012

Origin
- Mill name: Windlust
- Mill location: Industriestraat 29, 8391 AG Noordwolde
- Coordinates: 52°53′28″N 6°08′32″E
- Operator(s): Stichting De Oosthoek
- Year built: 1860

Information
- Purpose: Corn mill
- Type: Smock mill
- Storeys: Two storey smock
- Base storeys: Three storey base
- Smock sides: Eight sides
- No. of sails: Four sails
- Type of sails: Common sails. Fok system on leading edges
- Windshaft: Cast iron
- Winding: Tailpole and winch
- No. of pairs of millstones: One pair of millstones driven by wind, one pair driven by engine
- Size of millstones: 1.40 metres (4 ft 7 in) diameter (wind), 1.30 metres (4 ft 3 in) diameter (engine)

Windlust is a smock mill in Noordwolde, Friesland, Netherlands which was built in 1860 and is in working order. The mill is listed as a Rijksmonument.

== History ==
Windlust was built in 1860 by millwright Aberson of Steenwijk, Overijssel. On 1880, it was raised by millwright Middendorp of Wolvega, Friesland. In 1921, a brick engine house was added to the base. It houses a hot bulb engine by Schless und Rossmann of Cassel, Hesse, Germany. The engine was supplied by Fabrikaat Ten Zijthoff en Zoon, Deventer, Overijssel. Further restoration work was carried out in 1964, 1986 and 1990. The mill was owned by the Timmerman family. Windlust was worked mostly by engine in the 1930s, cur mostly by wind during World War II. Its condition deteriorated post-war and the mill ceased working in 1953. The mill was restored in 1959–62, its wooden windshaft being replaced by a cast-iron one, and the sails were fitted with the Fok system on the leading edges The work was carried out by millwright Medendorp of Zuidlaren, Drenthe.

Following the death of its owner in December 1968, Windlust was bequeathed to the Stichting De Oosthoek. The mill was not worked at all for three years, and then only occasionally until 1975. Since then, it is regularly worked on a Saturday. Repairs done to the hot bulb engine in 1983 allow it to be used to demonstrate milling by engine. The mill was damaged by a storm on 18 January 2007, but was soon repaired. It was returned to working order by June 2007. Windlust is listed as a Rijksmonument, number 38864.

== Description ==
Windlust is what the Dutch describe as a "Stellingmolen". It is a smock mill on a brick base. The stage is 6.20 metres (20 ft 4 in) above ground level. The smock and cap are thatched. The mill is winded by tailpole and winch. The sails are Common sails with the Fok system on the leading edges. They have a span of 18.00 metres (59 ft 1 in). The sails are carried on a cast-iron windshaft which was made by Gietijzerij H. J. Koning of Foxham, Groningen. The windshaft also carries the brake wheel, which has 57 cogs. This drives the wallower (28 cogs) at the top of the upright shaft. At the bottom of the upright shaft is the great spur wheel, which has 61 cogs. The great spur wheel drives one pair of millstones via a lantern pinion stone nut which has 21 staves. The Cullen millstones are 1.50 metres (4 ft 11 in) diameter. The hot bulb engine drives a pair of 1.40 metres (4 ft 7 in) diameter Cullen stones separate to the wind driven stones.

== Millers ==
- O Bel (1859- )
- L Dijkstra ( -1885)
- Harm van der Weerst (1885–91)
- Geerhof Smit (1891–98)
- Cornelis Greven (1898-1906)
- Jan Timmerman (1906–27)
- Sietze Timmerman (1927–68)

References for above:-

== Public access ==
Windlust is open to the public on Saturdays between 13:00 and 17:30.
