= De Gooyer =

De Gooyer is the name of a number of windmills in the Netherlands, including -

- De Gooyer, Amsterdam, North Holland
- De Gooyer, Wolvega, Friesland
