= Windlust, Wolvega =

Windmill in Wolvega, Netherlands

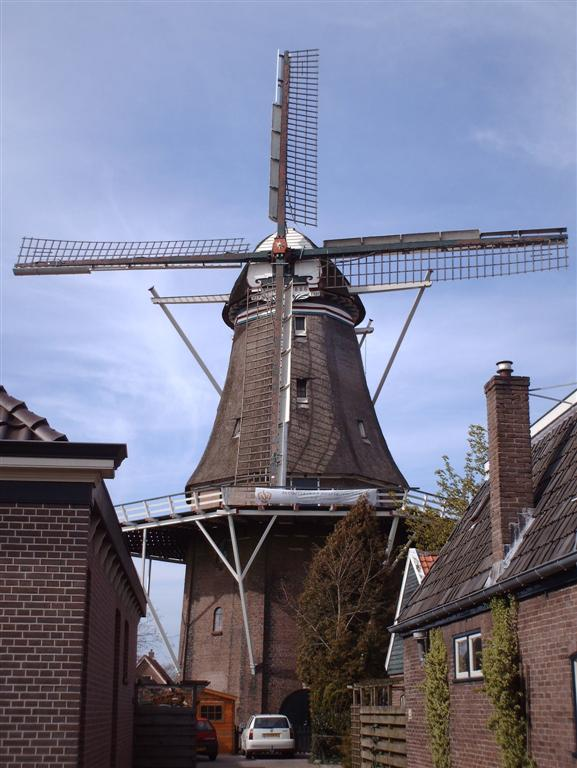
- Windlust, April 2007

Origin
- Mill name: Windlust
- Mill location: Hoofdstraat West 52, 8471 HW, Wolvega
- Coordinates: 53°52′26″N 5°26′12″E
- Operator(s): Gemeente Westellingwerf
- Year built: 1884

Information
- Purpose: Corn mill and pearl barley mill
- Type: Smock mill
- Storeys: Three storey smock
- Base storeys: Four storey base
- Smock sides: Eight sides
- No. of sails: Four sails
- Type of sails: Common sails, Fok system on leading edges
- Windshaft: Cast iron
- Winding: Tailpole and winch
- No. of pairs of millstones: Two pairs
- Size of millstones: 1.60 metres (5 ft 3 in) diameter

Windlust (English: "A love of wind") is a smock mill in Wolvega, Friesland, Netherlands which was built in 1884 and is in working order. The mill is listed as a Rijksmonument.

== History ==
Windlust was built in 1888 on the site of a post mill. A new base was built; the smock having previously stood at Mijdrecht, Utrecht, where the mill was a drainage mill. The work was done by millwright Visser of Heerenveen, Friesland for Wibe Hooisma. On 31 August 1893, the mill was sold to Mhr. Hulscher. The mill was sold to Jan de Jong in 1896. He sold it to Bulsma van der Woude in 1902. The mill was sold to Arie Nijkerk in 1925. It was bought by C A F Oldeberkoop on 1 October 1930. He employed Ebbel Lenstra as miller. A diesel engine was installed in 1937, but it went out of use during World War II due to a lack of available fuel. Oldeberkoop owned the mill until 1943, when it was bought by the Gemeente Westellingwerf. Out of use as a mill, the local fire brigade utilised it for drying their hoses. Following storm damage in 1971, the mill was restored to working order. A replacement pair of millstones was acquired from North Brabant in 1982. Also in that year, a crusher was acquired from a German watermill. Windlust is listed as a Rijksmonument, № 39437.

== Description ==
Windlust is what the Dutch describe as a "Stellingmolen". It is a smock mill on a brick base. The stage is 9.66 metres (31 ft 8 in) above ground level. The smock and cap are thatched. The mill is winded by tailpole and winch. The sails are Common sails, fitted with the Fok system on their leading edges. They have a span of 27.20 metres (89 ft 3 in). The sails are carried on a cast-iron windshaft, which was cast by the IJzergieterij Weduwe A Sterkman en Zoon, The Hague, South Holland in 1861. The windshaft also carries the brake wheel which has 69 teeth. This drives the wallower (35 teeth) at the top of the upright shaft. At the bottom of the upright shaft is the great spur wheel, which has 120 cogs. The great spur wheel drives a pair of 1.60 metres (5 ft 3 in) diameter Cullen millstones via a lantern pinion stone nut which has 29 staves. A pair of 1.60-metre (5 ft 3 in) French Burr millstones is driven via a lantern pinion stone nut which has 29 staves. It formerly drove a third pair of millstones.

== Millers ==
The following people have been millers in Windlust:

- Wibe Hooisma (1888–93)
- Mhr. Hulscher (1893–96)
- Jan de Jong (1896-1902)
- Bulsma van de Woude (1902–25)
- Arie Bijkerk (1925–30)
- Ebbel Lenstra (1930–37)

== Public access ==
Windlust is open to the public on Saturday between 08:00 and 11:30, or by appointment.
