= De Gooyer, Wolvega =

Windmill in Wolvega, Netherlands

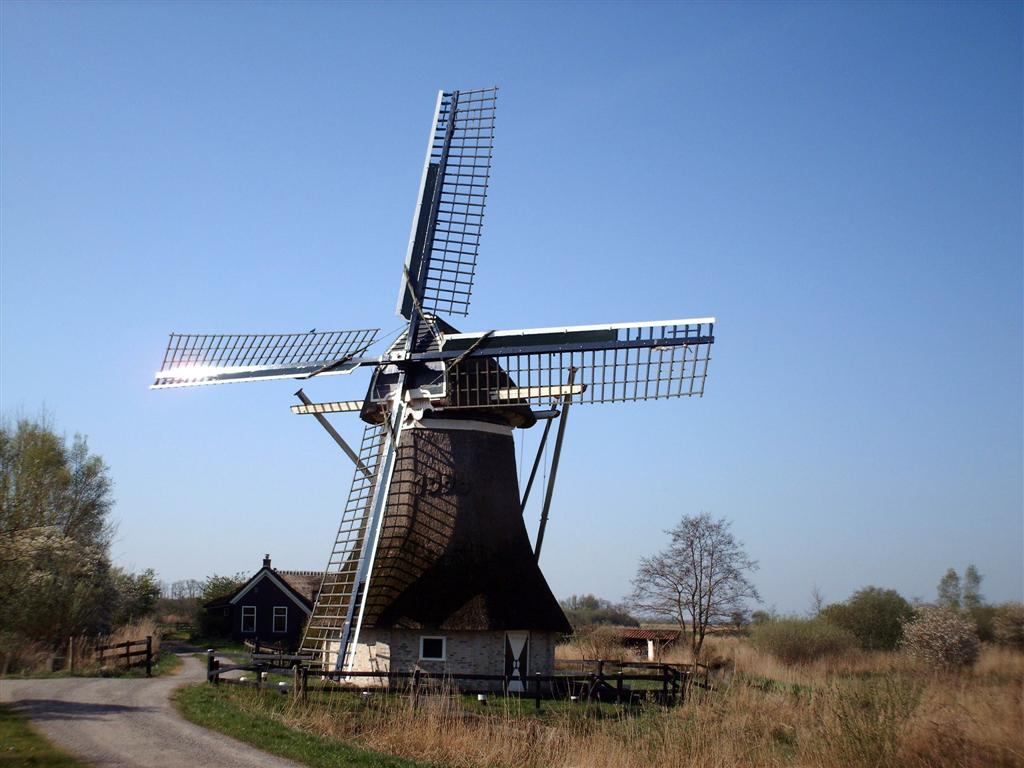
- De Gooyer, April 2007.

Origin
- Mill name: De Gooyer; De Wâlden
- Mill location: Steenwijkerweg 76, 8471 LC, Wolvega
- Coordinates: 52°51′22″N 6°01′10″E
- Operator(s): Vereniging It Fryske Gea
- Year built: 1917

Information
- Purpose: Drainage mill
- Type: Smock mill
- Storeys: Two storey smock
- Base storeys: One storey base
- Smock sides: Eight sides
- No. of sails: Four sails
- Type of sails: Common sails
- Windshaft: Cast iron
- Winding: Tailpole and winch
- Type of pump: Archimedes' screw

De Gooyer is a smock mill in Wolvega, Friesland, Netherlands which was built in 1916. It has been restored to working order. It is listed as a Rijksmonument.

== History ==
De Gooyer was built originally built in 1775 at Blesdijke, Friesland where it was used as a drainage mill. Circa 1835, it was moved to Noordwolde, where it was converted to a corn mill, the Molen van Menga. In 1917, the mill was moved to Wolvega and converted back to a drainage mill. The work was carried out by millwright Lute Middendorp of Wolvega. The mill replaced a hollow post mill that had been struck by lightning on 11 July 1917 and burnt down. The mill was restored in 1967-69. In 1986, it lost its sails in a storm. The mill was known as De Wâlden, only gaining the name De Gooyer after a restoration in 1990-91 by millwright Tacoma of Stiens, Friesland. The mill was officially opened on National Mills Day, 11 May 1991. It is listed as a Rijksmonument, №38882.

== Description ==
De Gooyer is what the Dutch describe as a Grondzeiler. It is a two storey smock mill on a single storey base. There is no stage, the sails reaching almost to ground level. The mill is winded by tailpole and winch. The smock and cap are thatched. The sails are Common sails. They have a span of 19.80 metres (65 ft 0 in). The sails are carried on a cast iron windshaft, which was cast by Gietijzerij Hardinxveld-Giessendam in 1987. The windshaft carries the brake wheel which has 48 cogs. This drives the wallower (27 cogs) at the top of the upright shaft. At the bottom of the upright shaft there are two crown wheels The upper crown wheel, which has 43 cogs drives an Archimedes' screw via a crown wheel. The lower crown wheel, which has 40 cogs is carried on the axle of an Archimedes' screw, which is used to drain the polder. The axle of the screw is 37 centimetres (15 in) diameter and 4.20 metres (13 ft 9 in) long. The screw is 1.37 metres (4 ft 6 in) diameter. It is inclined at 24°. Each revolution of the screw lifts 612 litres (135 imp gal) of water.

== Public access ==
De Gooyer is usually open on Saturday afternoons, or by appointment.
