= Noordwolde, Friesland =

Noordwolde
- Village
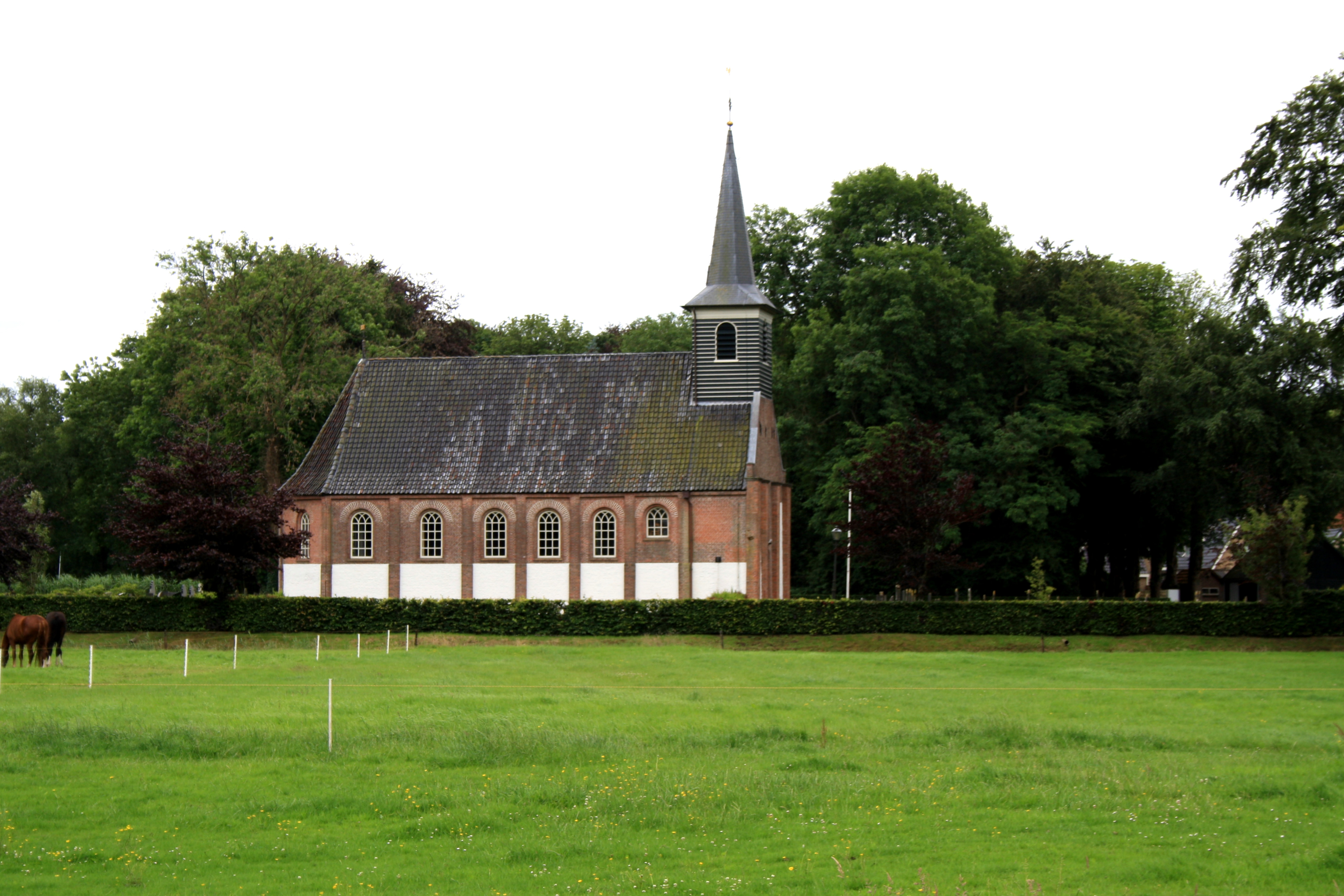
- Noordwolde Church

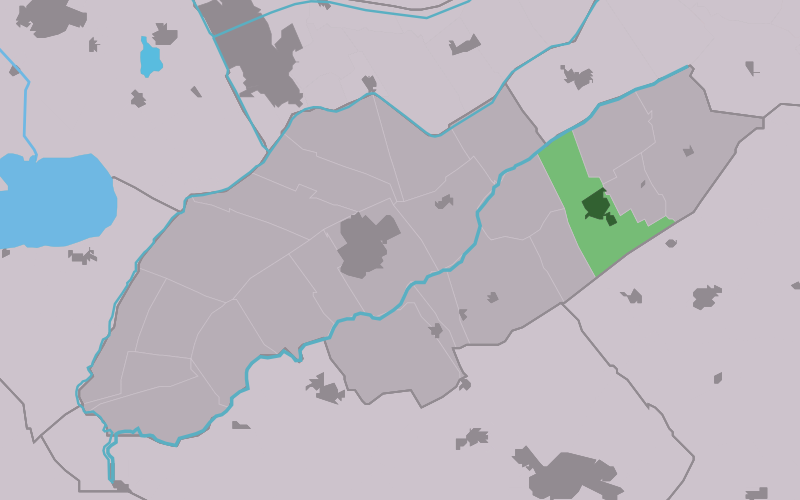
- Location in Weststellingwerf municipality

- Location in the Netherlands Noordwolde (Netherlands)
- Country: Netherlands
- Province: Friesland
- Municipality: Weststellingwerf

Area
  - Total: 12.42 km^{2} (4.80 sq mi)
- Elevation: 2.4 m (7.9 ft)

Population (2021)
  - Total: 3,645
  - Density: 293.5/km^{2} (760.1/sq mi)
- Time zone: UTC+1 (CET)
  - Summer (DST): UTC+2 (CEST)
- Postal code: 8391
- Dialing code: 0561

Noordwolde (Dutch pronunciation: [ˈnoːrtˌʋɔldə]; West Frisian: Noardwâlde) is a village in Weststellingwerf in the province of Friesland, the Netherlands. It had a population of around 3,600 as of 2017. Noordwolde-Zuid, the settlement to the south of Noordwolde is considered a separate village.

Noordwolde lies north of Steenwijk and east of Wolvega close to the tri-point of provinces Friesland, Drenthe, and Overijssel, in an enclosed landscape with the forests and heathlands of Drenthe to the south and east, and the Linde valley and the wider watery province of Friesland to the west.

There is a restored windmill in the village, Windlust. The National Museum of Weaving is located in the village. There is a natural lake, the Spokedam, which is partly surrounded by a beach, on the outskirts of Noordwolde. There are several camp sites near the lake such as "Hanestede" and the bungalow park "The Bosmeer".

== History ==
The village was first mentioned in 1408 as Noortwolde, and means "northern woods". Noordwolde is a peat excavation village which developed at the intersection of the Hoofdstraat with the Kolonievaart. Up to the 19th century, it was the capital of the grietenij (predecessor of the municipality) Weststellingwerf.

The Dutch Reformed church was built between 1639 and 1640 as a replacement of its medieval predecessor. The church was enlarged in 1853.

Noordwolde was home to 1,792 people in 1840. In the mid-19th century, Noordwolde became a centre for weaving, basket making and chair production. In 1912, a weaving school was founded in Noordwolde. The building nowadays houses a museum dedicated to weaving.

The rattan industry brought Noordwolde national fame. This industry arose by chance around 1825. By 1860, some two hundred families were already engaged in this cottage industry. During the First World War and the subsequent economic crisis, rattan exports stalled, and the industry largely came to an end.

== Places of interest ==
There is a swimming pool beside the Spokedam. There are two supermarkets and several other shops and restaurants in the village, and the largest model train shop (G-scale) in Europe is in Noordwolde.

== Notable people ==
- Johan Eilerts de Haan (1865–1910), Dutch explorer

== Gallery ==
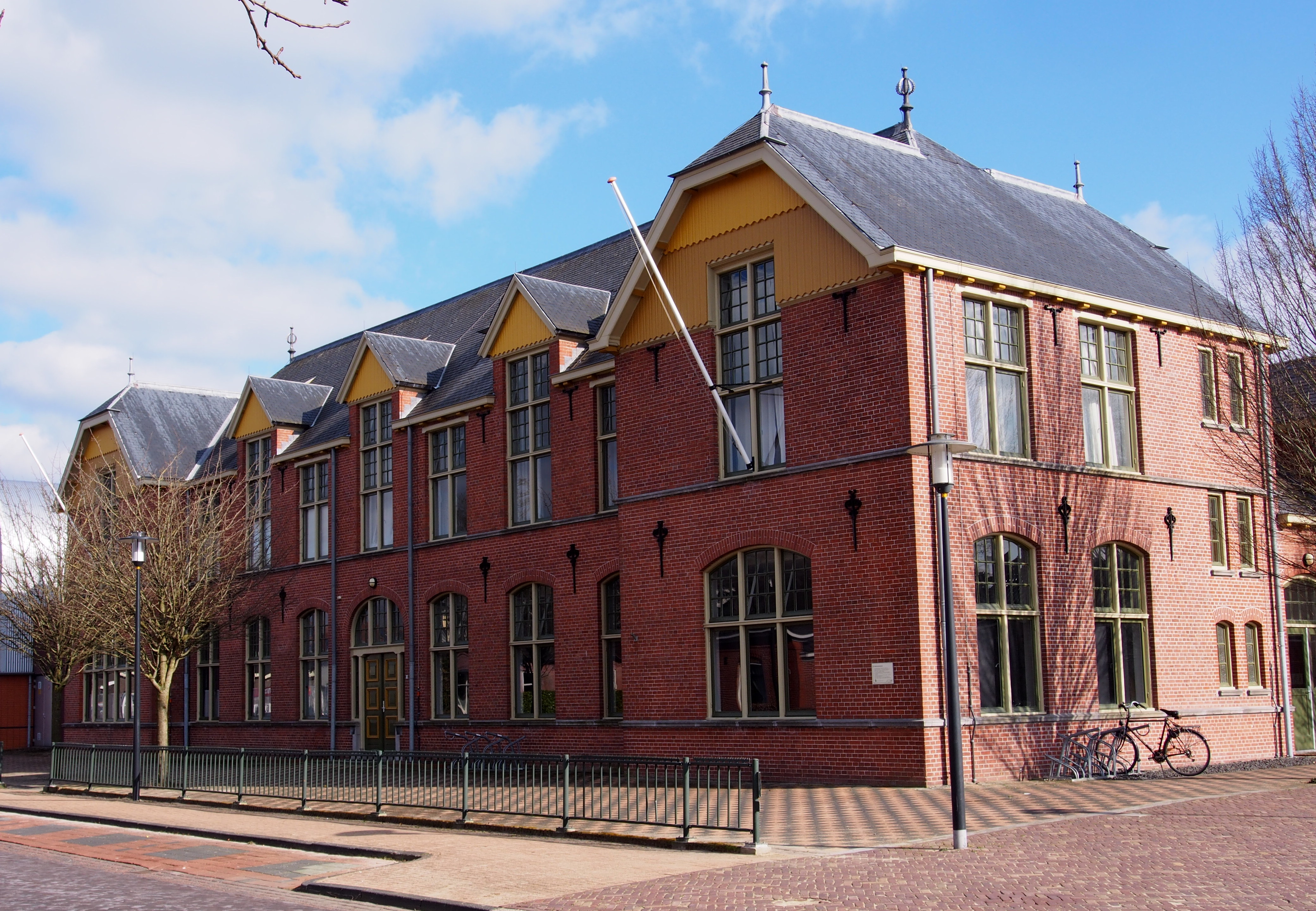
Weaving museum

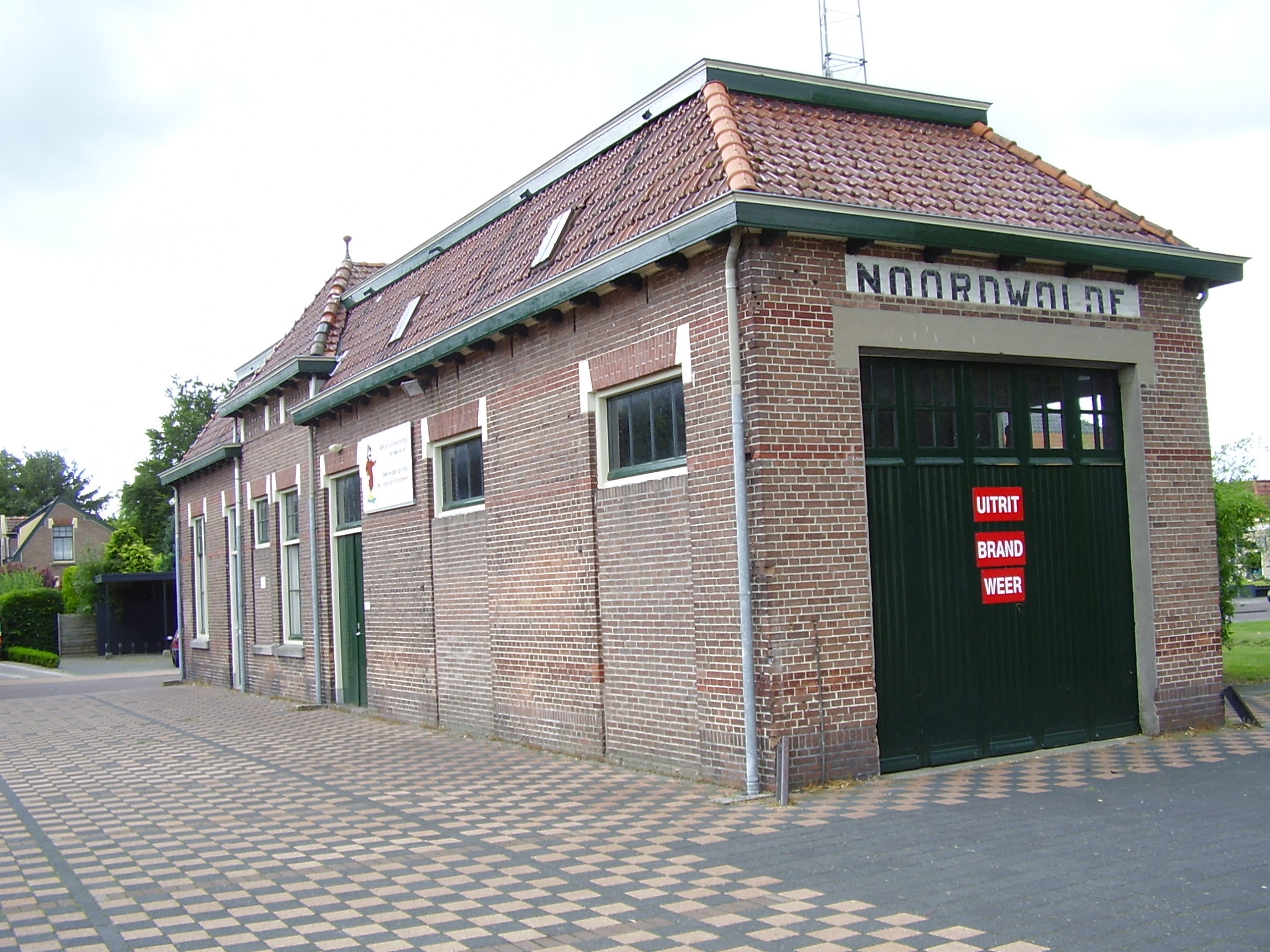
Former tram station used by the fire department

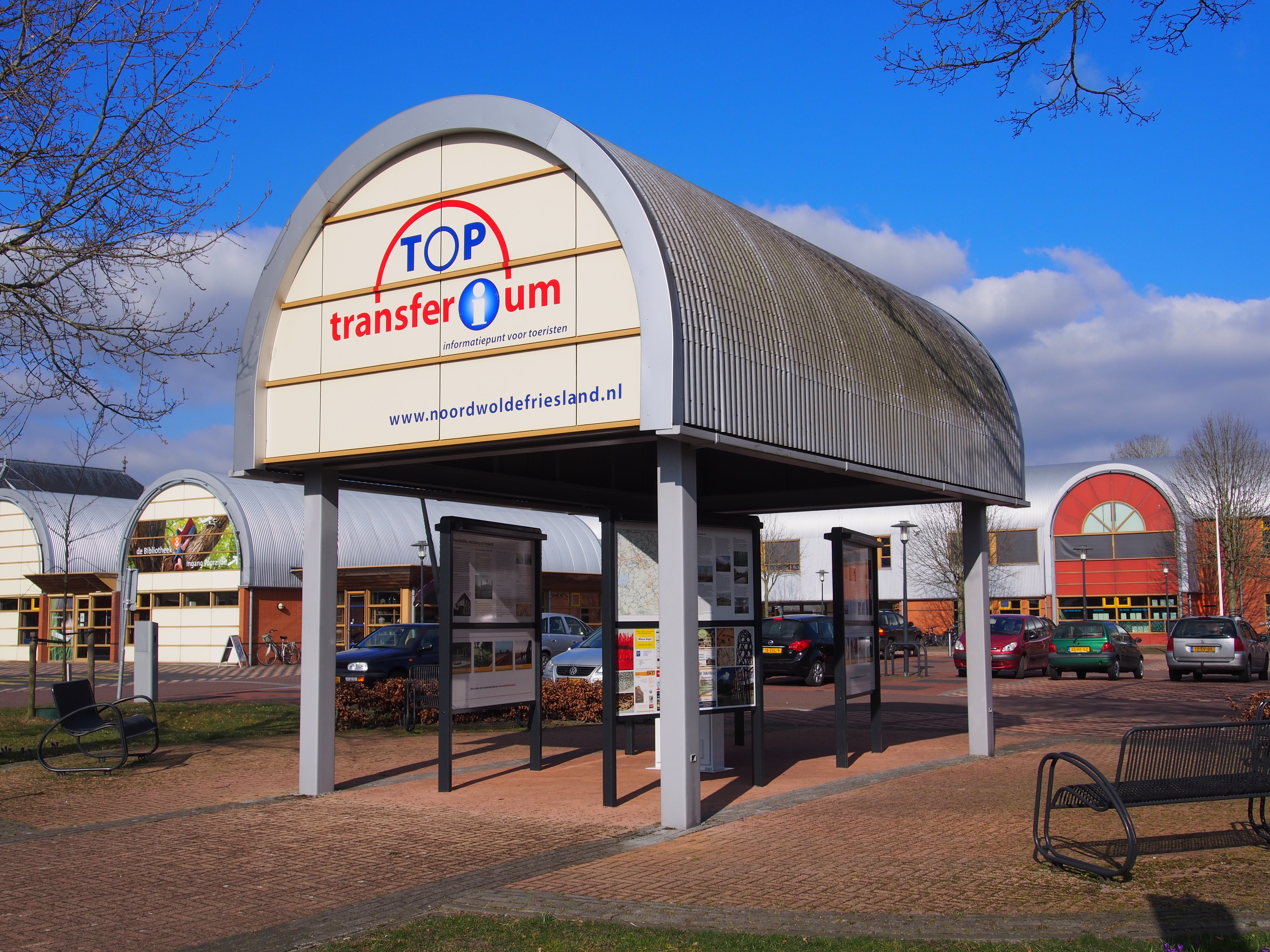
Tourist information

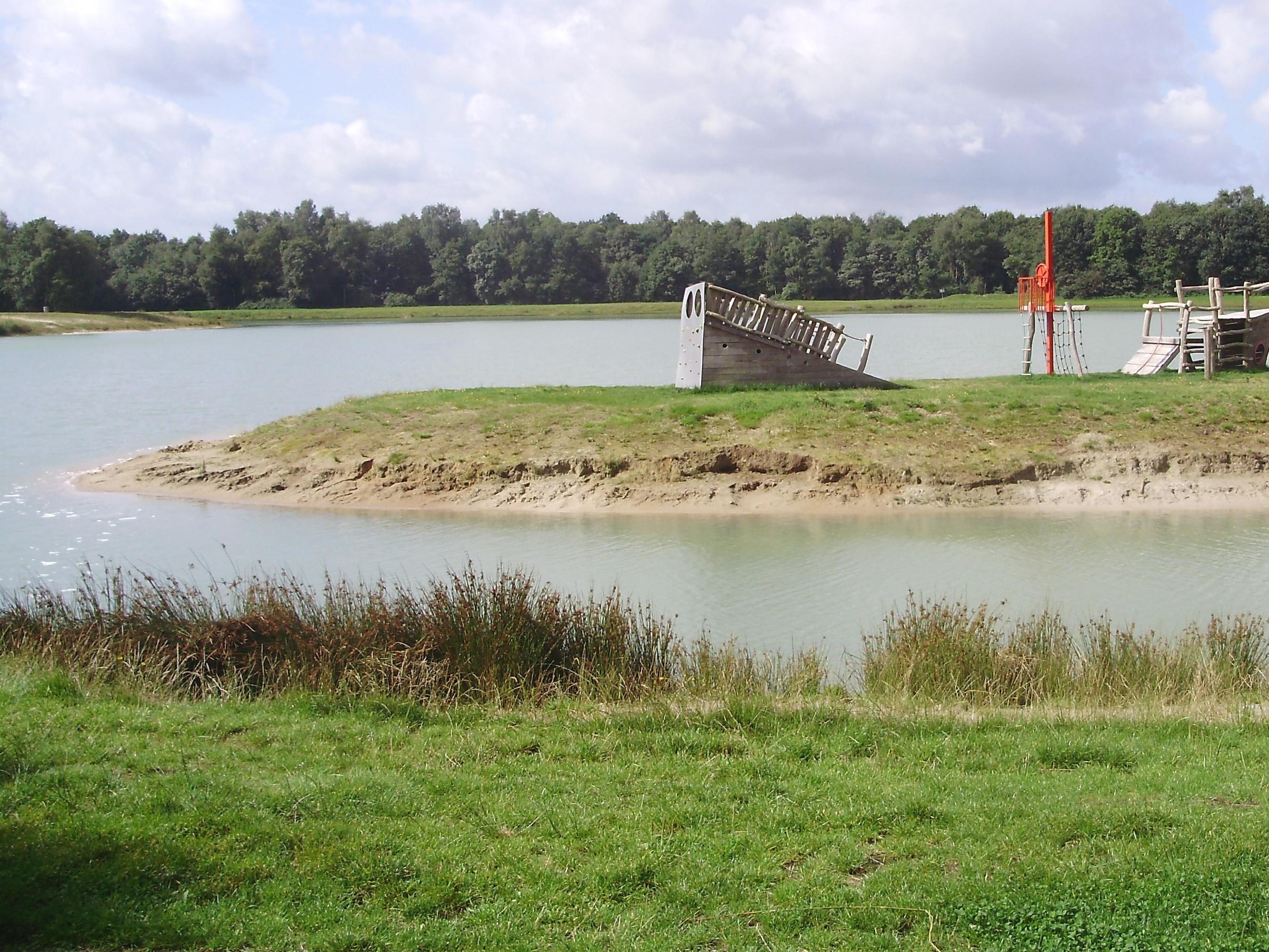
Spokeplas near Noordwolde
