= Wolvega =

Wolvega Wolvege (Low German) Wolvegea (West Frisian)
- Town
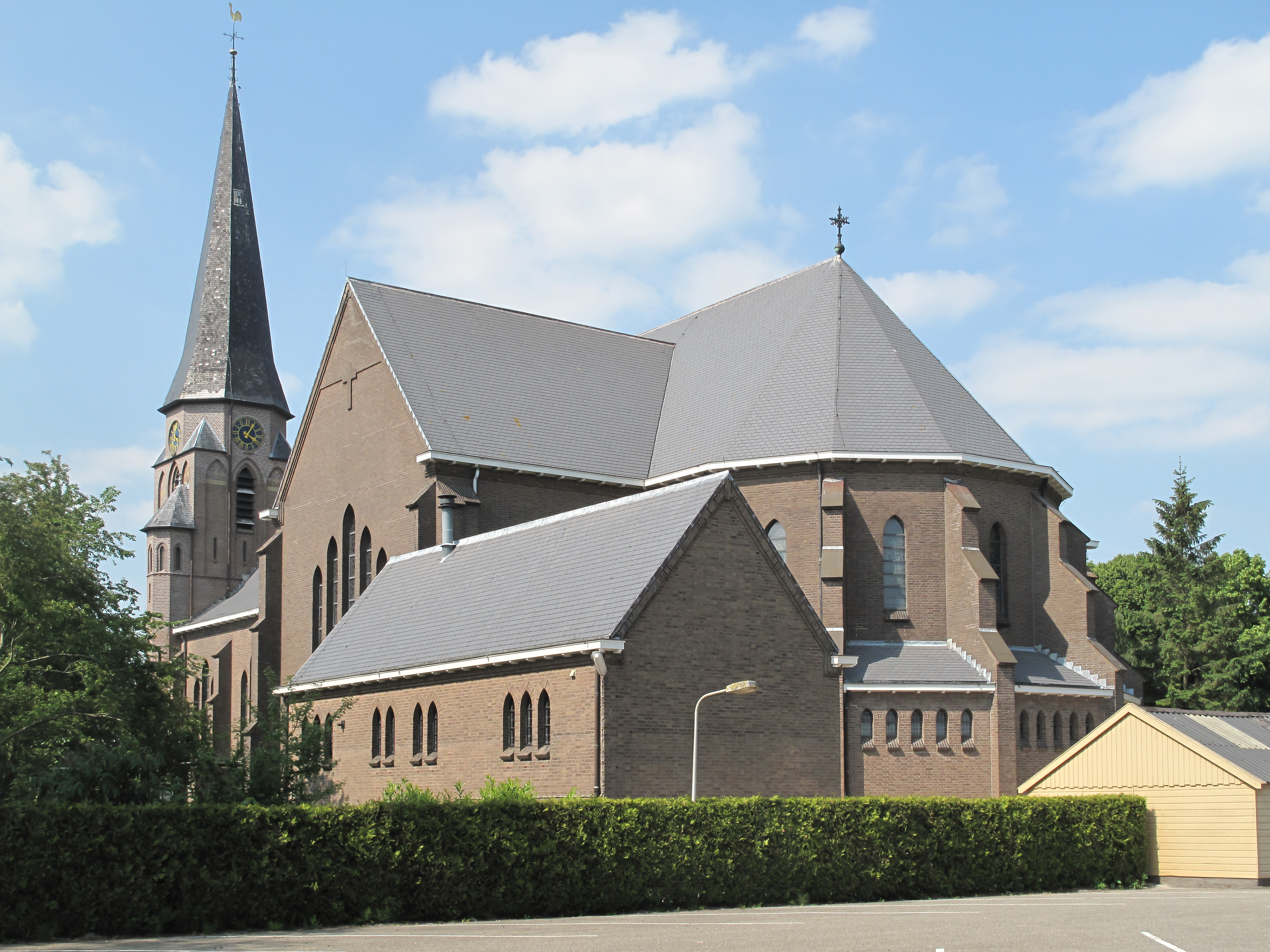
- St Francis Church

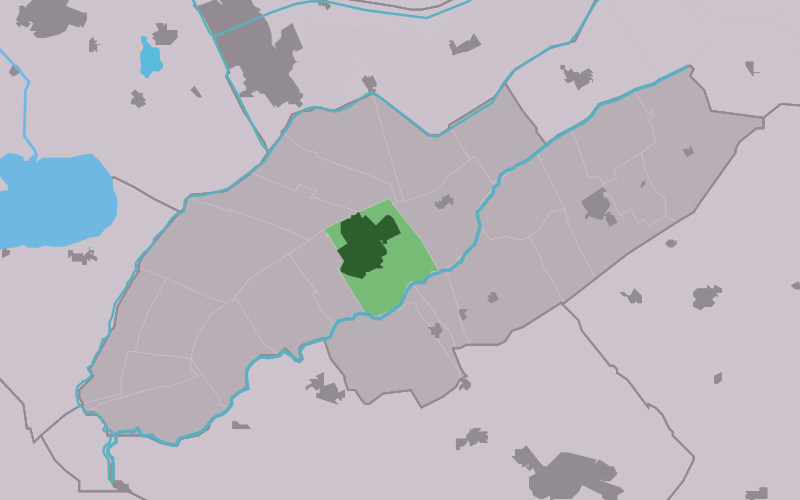
- Location in Weststellingwerf municipality

- Location in the Netherlands Wolvega (Netherlands)
- Country: Netherlands
- Province: Friesland
- Municipality: Weststellingwerf

Area
  - Total: 13.19 km^{2} (5.09 sq mi)
- Elevation: 0.8 m (2.6 ft)

Population (2021)
  - Total: 13,090
  - Density: 992.4/km^{2} (2,570/sq mi)
- Time zone: UTC+1 (CET)
  - Summer (DST): UTC+2 (CEST)
- Postal code: 8470–8472
- Dialing code: 0561

Wolvega (Low German: Wolvege), (West Frisian: Wolvegea) is the capital and largest town in the municipality of Weststellingwerf in the province of Friesland (Fryslan), in the Netherlands. It had a population of around 13,090 in 2021. Wolvega is also the largest settlement in the Stellingwerven region. It is situated between large towns Heerenveen and Steenwijk.

== History ==
The village was first mentioned in 1218, and means "settlement of Wolf (person)." The Dutch Reformed church was built in 1646 using material from its medieval predecessor. The tower was rebuilt after a fire in 1894.

Lycklama State was a stins built in the early 17th century. It was built as a fortified building even though advances in warfare had made the construction obsolete. In 1626, Rinco van Lycklama became grietman (predecessor of mayor/judge) of Stellingwerf-Westeinde. In 1736, it was in a dilapidated state and demolished. The Catholic retirement home Huize Lycklama was later built in its place.

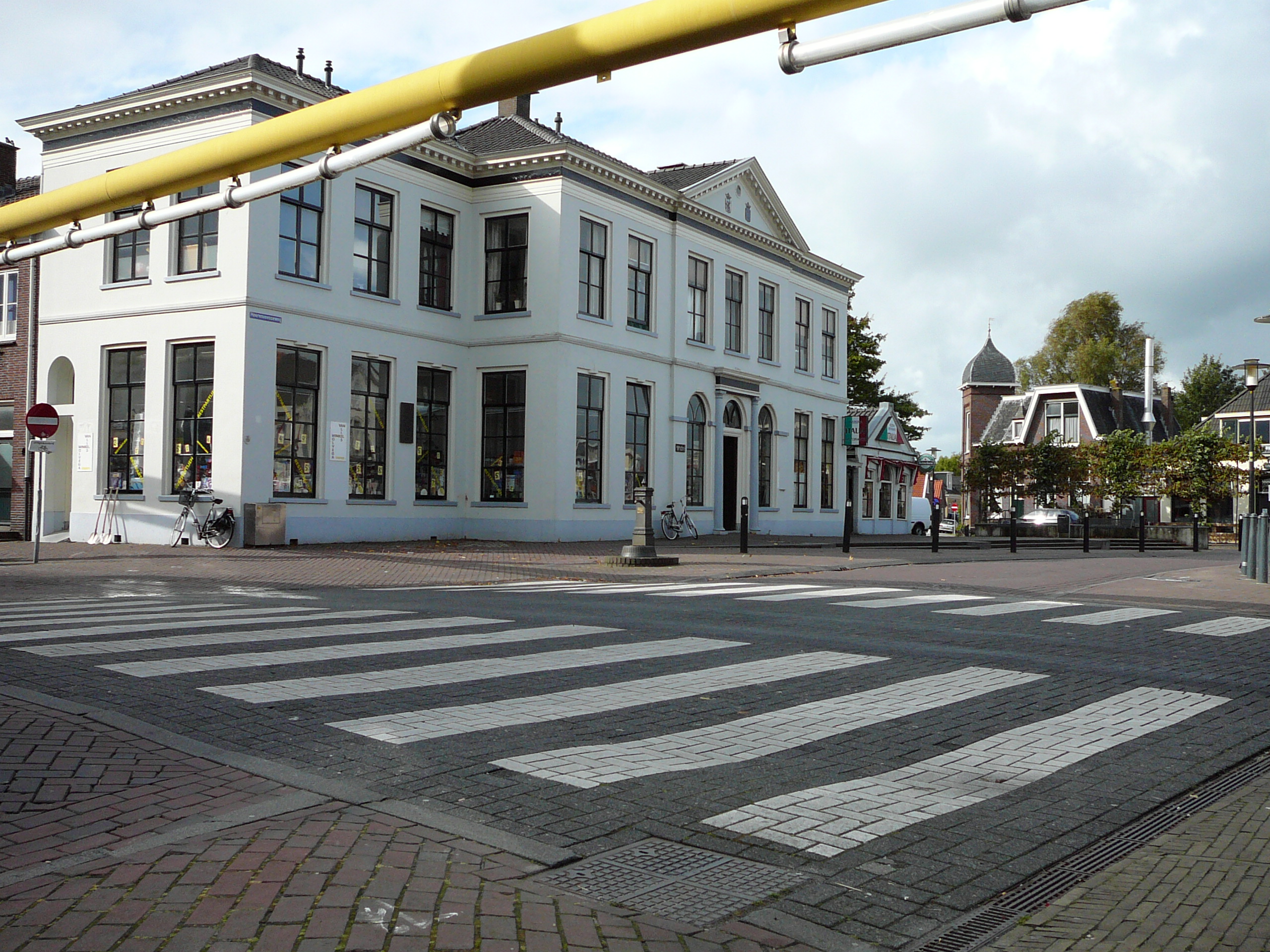
The old Grietenijhuis (town hall) of Weststellingwerf. Once at the intersection of the busiest roads, it now stands at the "Centrumplein" (Centrum Square)

Around 1820, the main road from Leeuwarden to Zwolle was constructed through Wolvega. In 1835, Wolvega became the capital of the municipality of Weststellingwerf. At the intersection of the two roads, the town hall (grietenijhuis) was opened in 1835 and this contributed to the development. It was home to 1,202 people in 1840.

Also the opening of the Staatslijn A railway between Arnhem, Zwolle, and Leeuwarden also contributed to the village's development. In 1868, the Wolvega railway station opened. The station building still stands despite years of threatened demolition.

During the 1950s, it became one of the industrial centre of Friesland, and started to develop into a town.

== Sights ==
The only remaining stins in Wolvega is Lindenoord which was built in 1780 in Louis XVI style. The estate used to organise horse races. The races moved to Victoria Park which hosts the largest horse race of the Netherlands.

There are two windmills in the town, De Gooyer and Windlust. Since 1888, the Windlust grain mill has defined the village. With a span of over 27 meters, it is the tallest in Friesland.

== Architecture ==
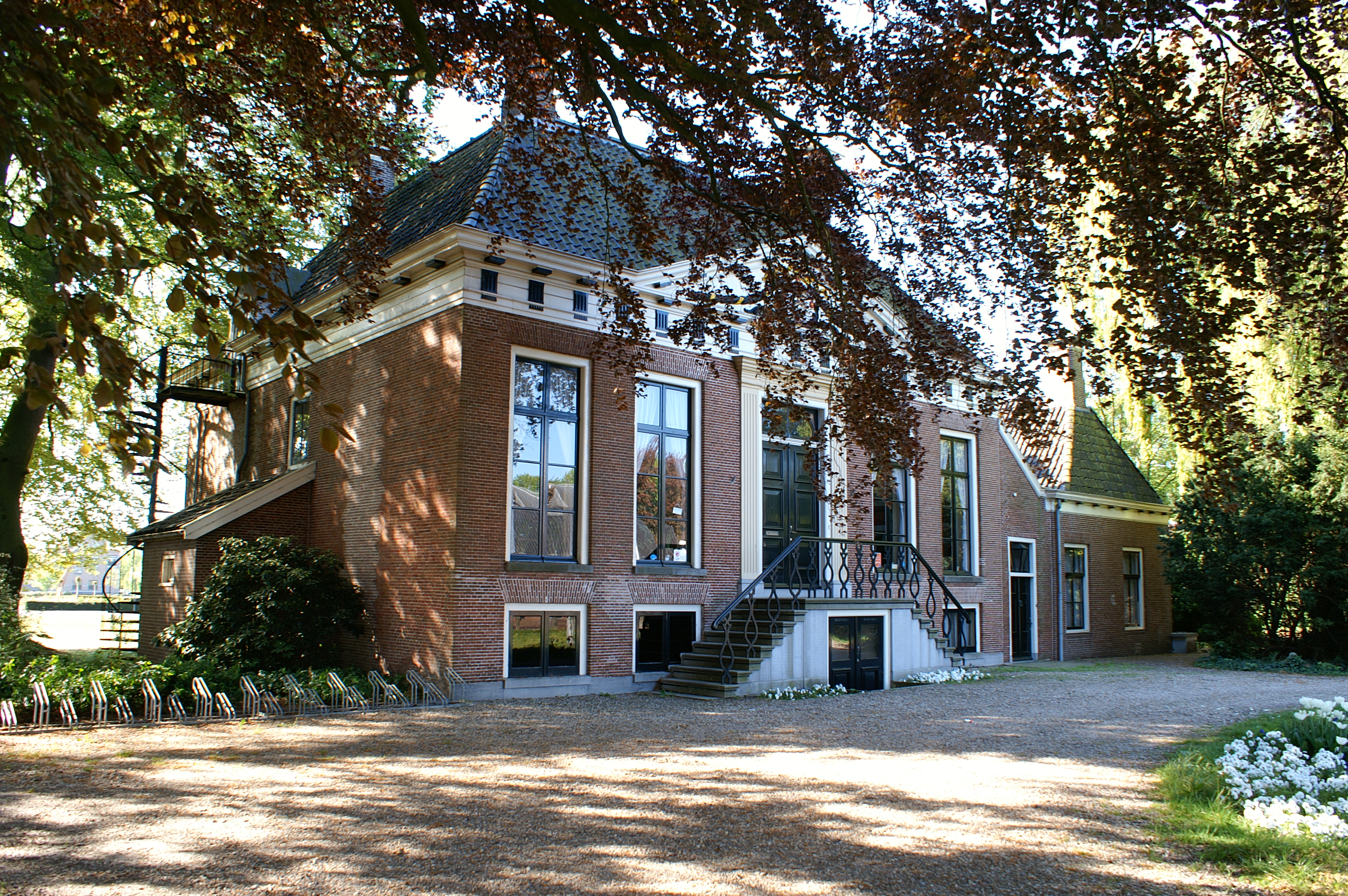
Huize Lindenoord

The only country house that still stands in Wolvega is Huize Lindenoord. Since 2024, the building has been owned by top chef Jan Smink, who moved his Michelin-starred restaurant Smink there after an extensive renovation of the building.

== Religion ==
The oldest church building in Wolvega is the Kerk op de Hoogte, a PKN Protestant church. It was built in 1646 after the destruction of the original church, partly by reusing sections of the old wall. On the other side of the railway line stands the Roman Catholic St. Francis Church, built in 1939. This replaced a house of worship built in 1861, the first Catholic church after the Reformation.

== Economy ==
Wolvega is a village in an agricultural area situated between the Linde (Lende) and Tjonger (Kuinder) rivers. Later, the peat trade also became an important source of income. After peat was increasingly replaced as a fuel by fossil fuels the village attracted more industry. Wolvega now has three large industrial estates.

== Transport ==
Wolvega is on the main highway between the large cities Zwolle and Leeuwarden, the A32. It crosses the provincial road N351 which connects Wolvega to Emmeloord southwest and Oosterwolde northeast.

== Gallery ==
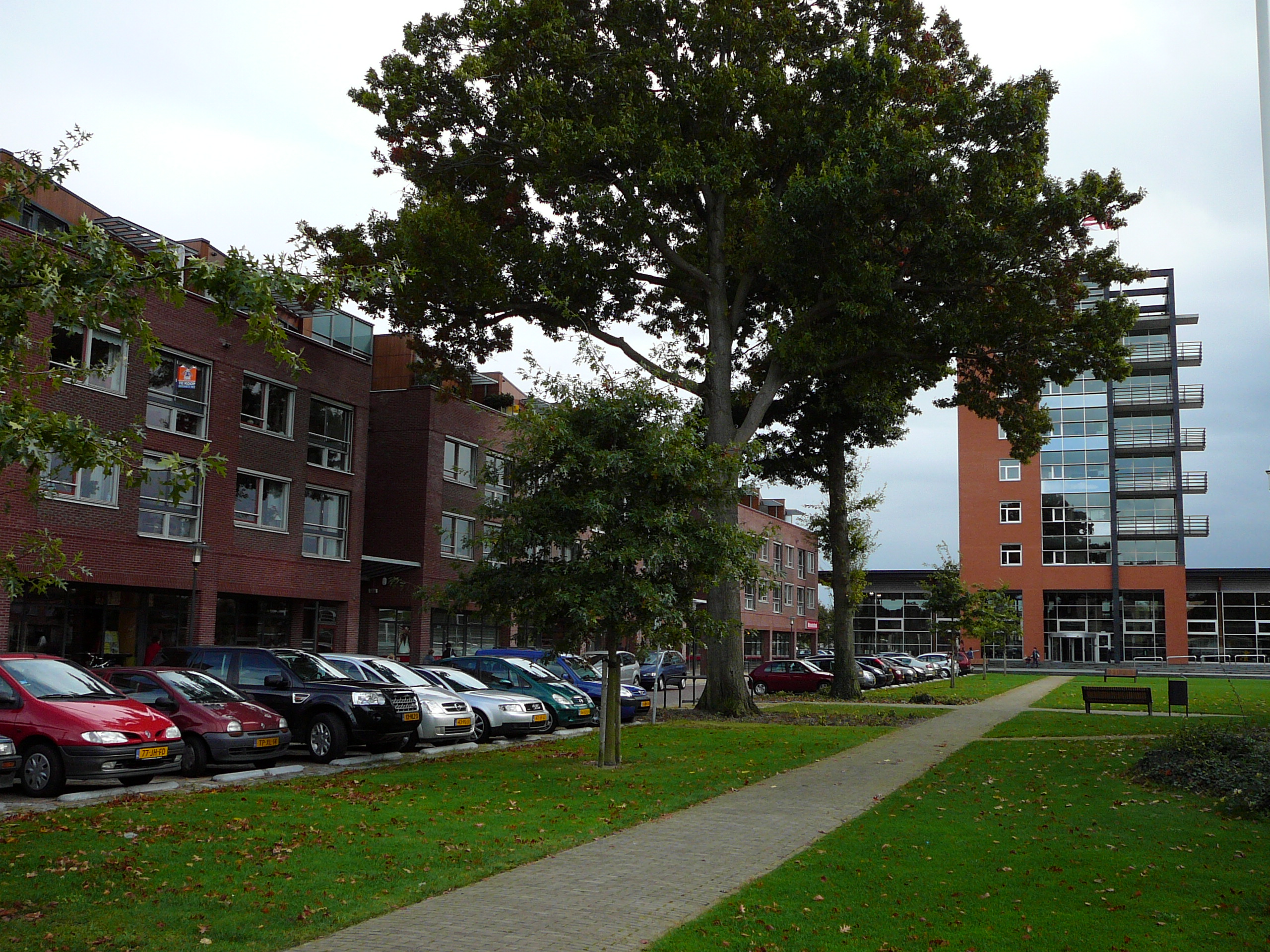
Town Hall

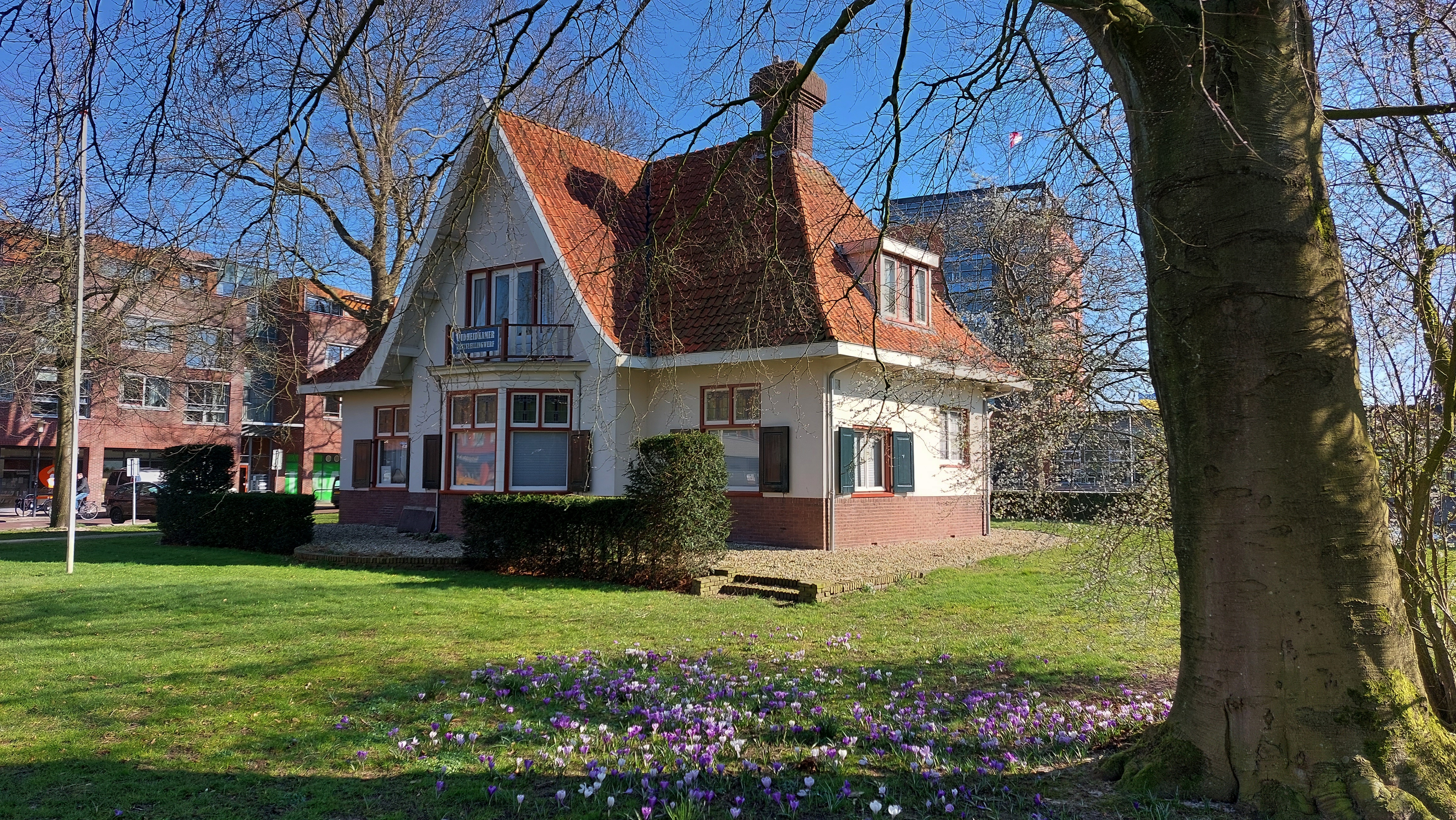
House in Wolvega

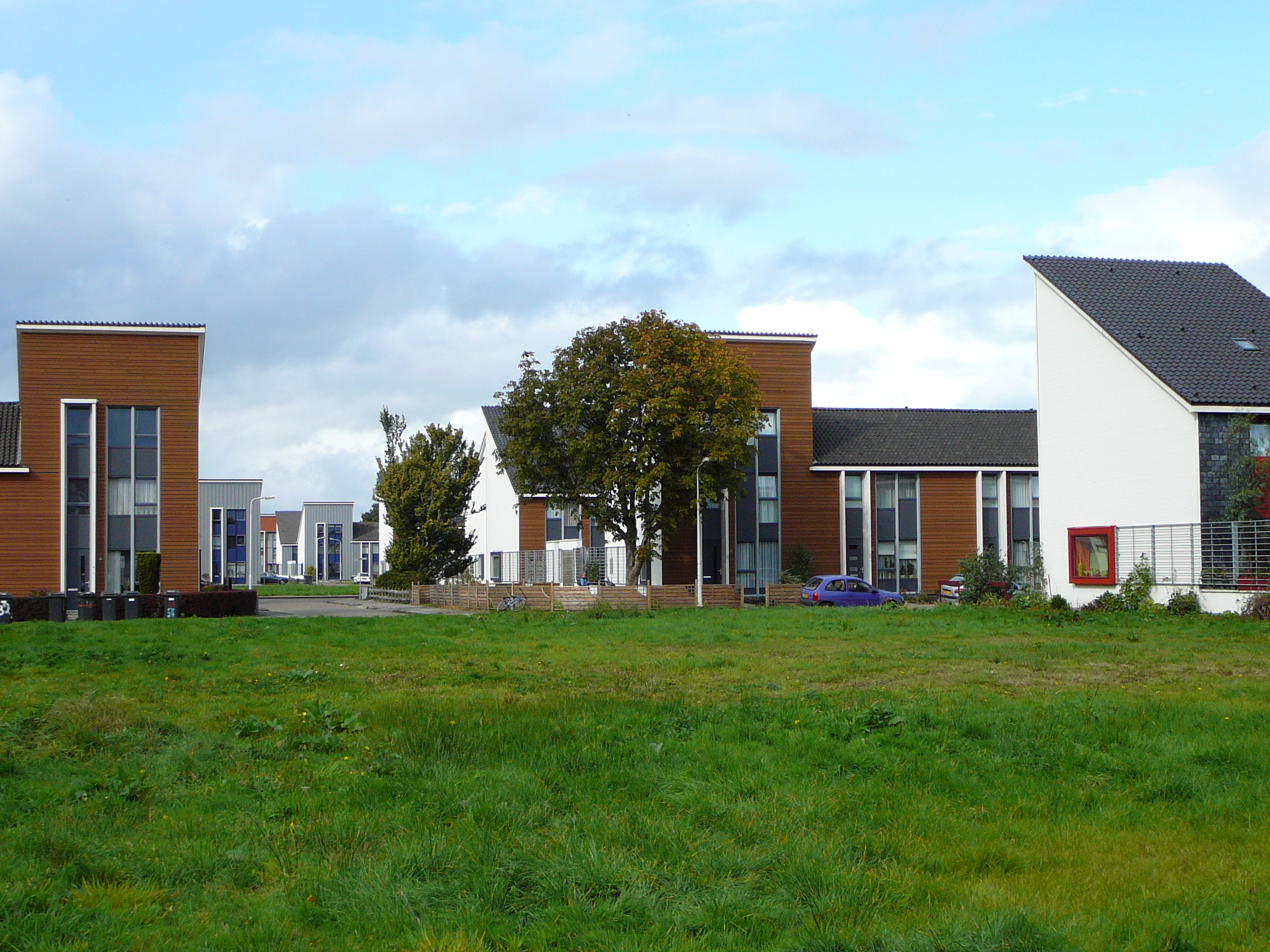
Neighbourhood in Wolvega

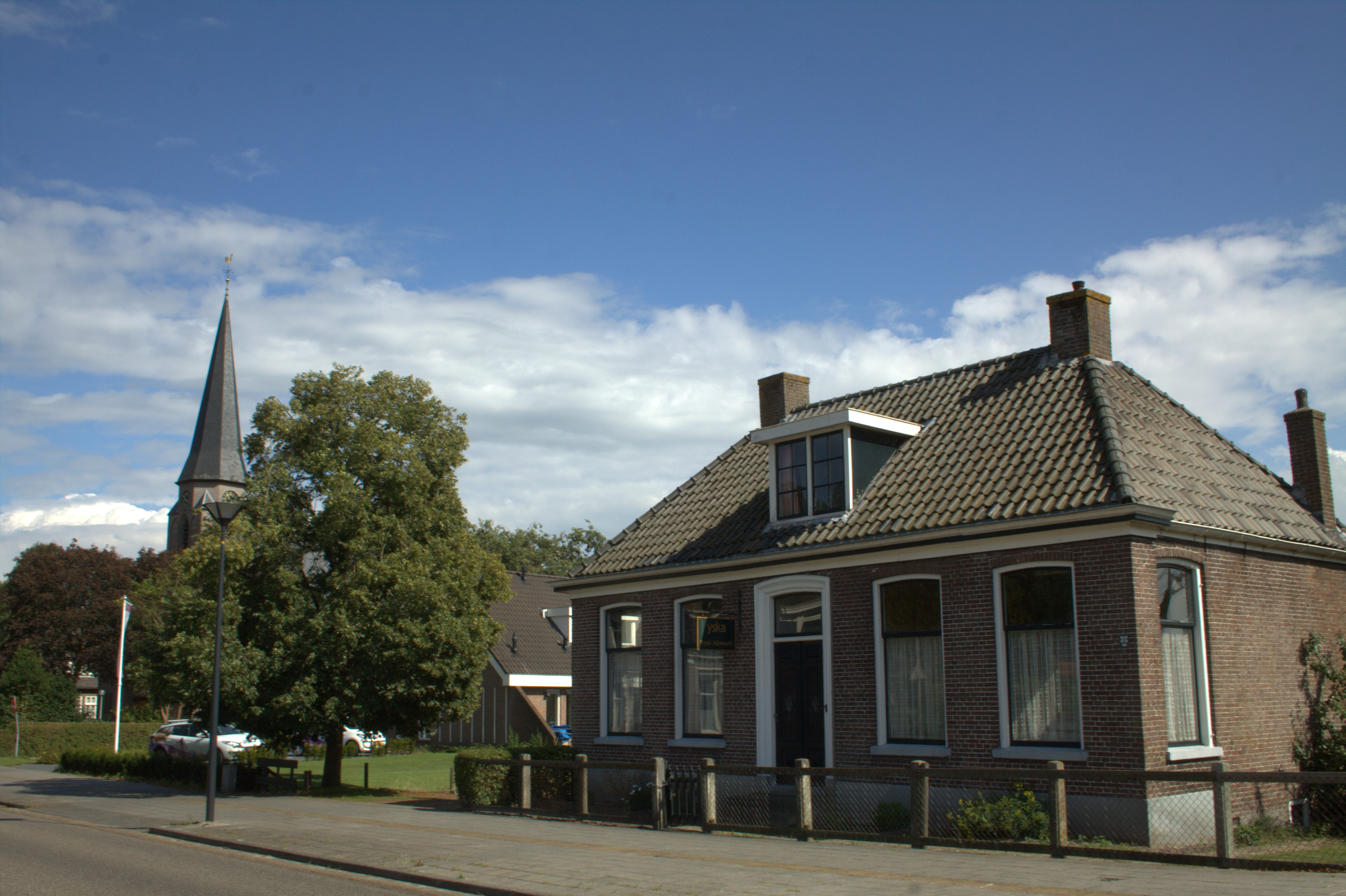
Street view

== See also ==
- Victoria Park, Wolvega
- Wolvega railway station
