= Brongerga =

Brongerga Brongergea (West Frisian)
- Hamlet
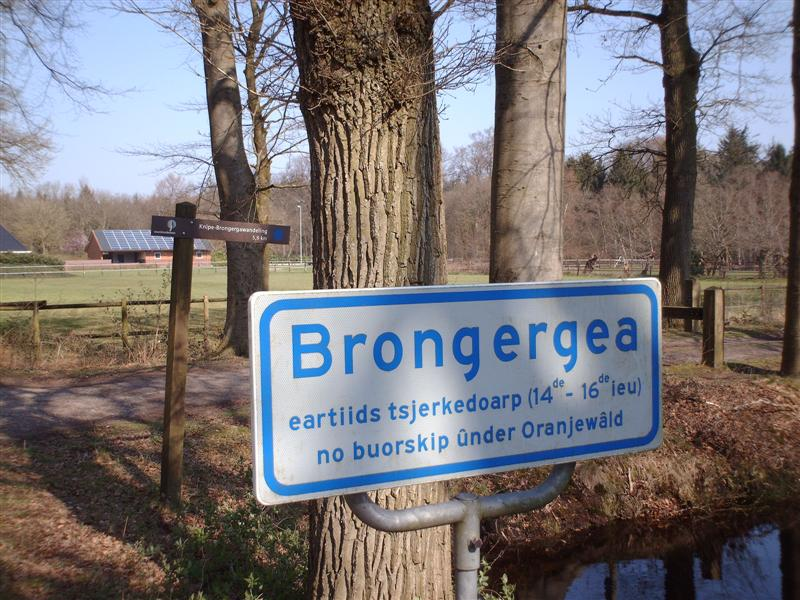
- Entrance to Brongerga

- Flag Coat of arms

- Location in the province of Friesland in the Netherlands Brongerga (Netherlands)
- Coordinates: 52°57′N 5°59′E
- Country: Netherlands
- Province: Friesland
- Municipality: Heerenveen
- Village: Oranjewoud
- Elevation: 1.9 m (6.2 ft)
- Time zone: UTC+1 (CET)
  - Summer (DST): UTC+2 (CEST)
- Postcode: 8453
- Area code: 0513

Brongerga (Dutch: [ˈbrɔŋərˌɣaː]; West Frisian: Brongergea) is a hamlet in the Dutch municipality of Heerenveen in the province of Friesland. It is located in the Oranjewoud Park area, east of the village of Oranjewoud. It also formally falls under Oranjewoud.

Brongerga was a small farming community that originated in the 11th or 12th century. This grew into a large church village from the 14th to the 17th century. The area of the village stretched from the raised bog of De Knipe on the Schoterlandse Compagnonsvaart to the river Tjonger.

Several new centers emerged on the territory of the village. The first center was near a dam, which was called Mildam and was first mentioned in 1523. Another center that emerged bore the name Nieuw Brongerga which later became De Knipe. The new centers grew and the importance of Brongerga decreased from the 16th century onwards. The village area also shrank to eventually become a hamlet. With the rise of Oranjewoud it became a hamlet with only a small core of habitation.

The Marijkemuoiwei road runs through the hamlet of Brongerga. There are a number of houses and farms. In 2004 it received its own white place name signs. The cemetery contains one of the wooden bell towers in Friesland and the burial vaults of the families of Limburg Stirum and De Blocq van Scheltinga. Furthermore, nearby Brongerga, on the 'mountain of Brongerga', is a belvedere.

== Gallery ==
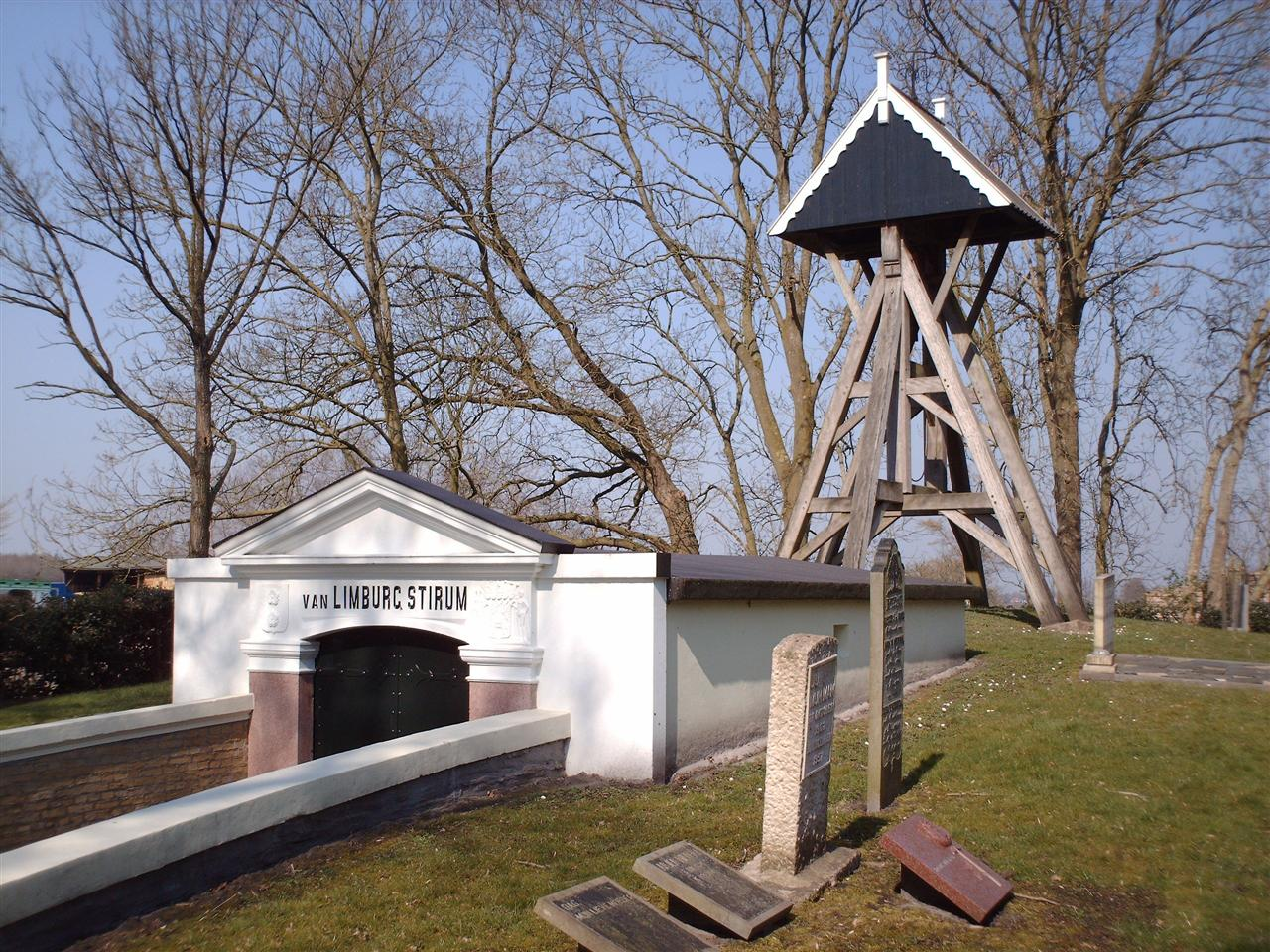
Cemetery

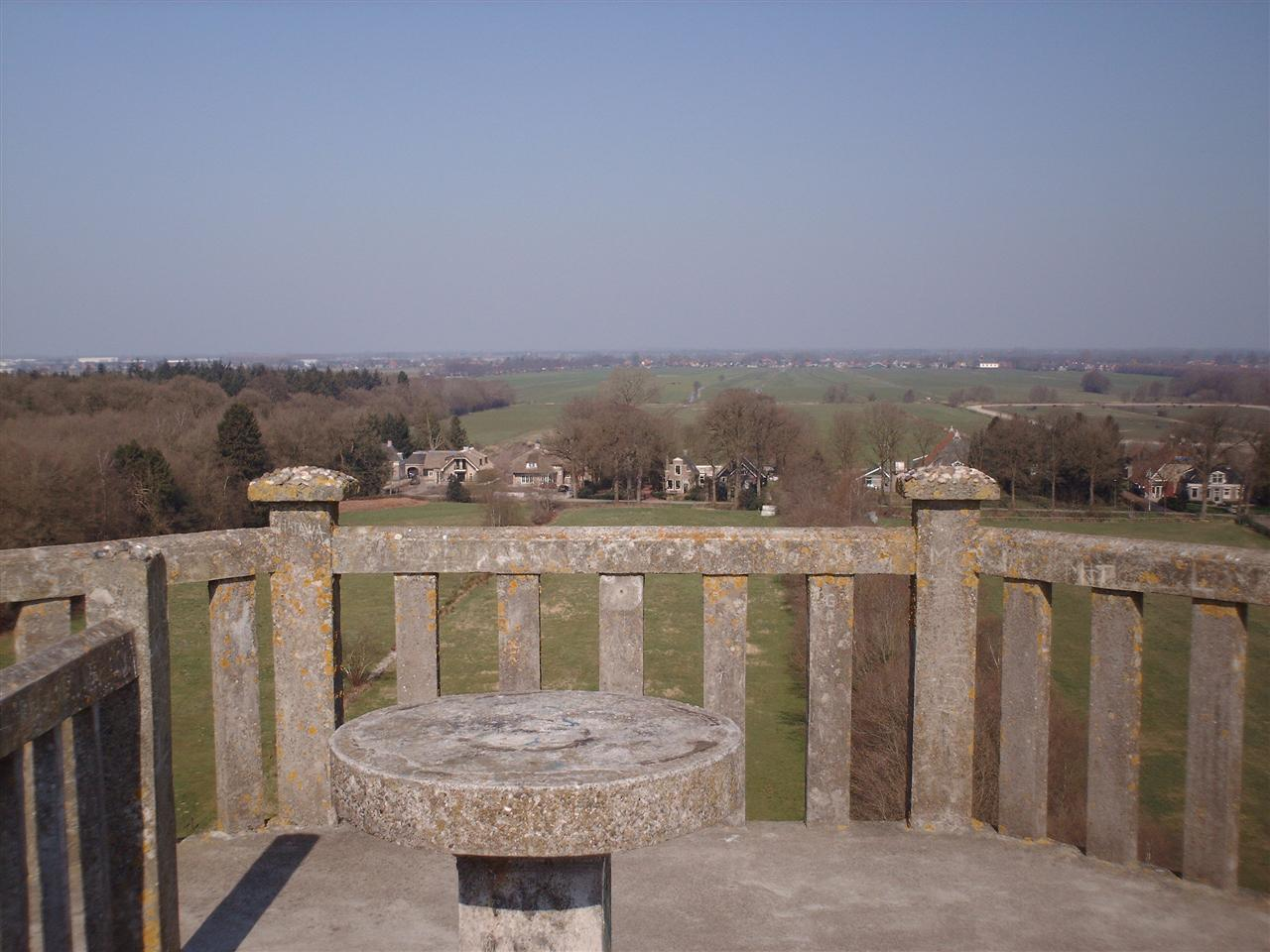
View from the belvedere

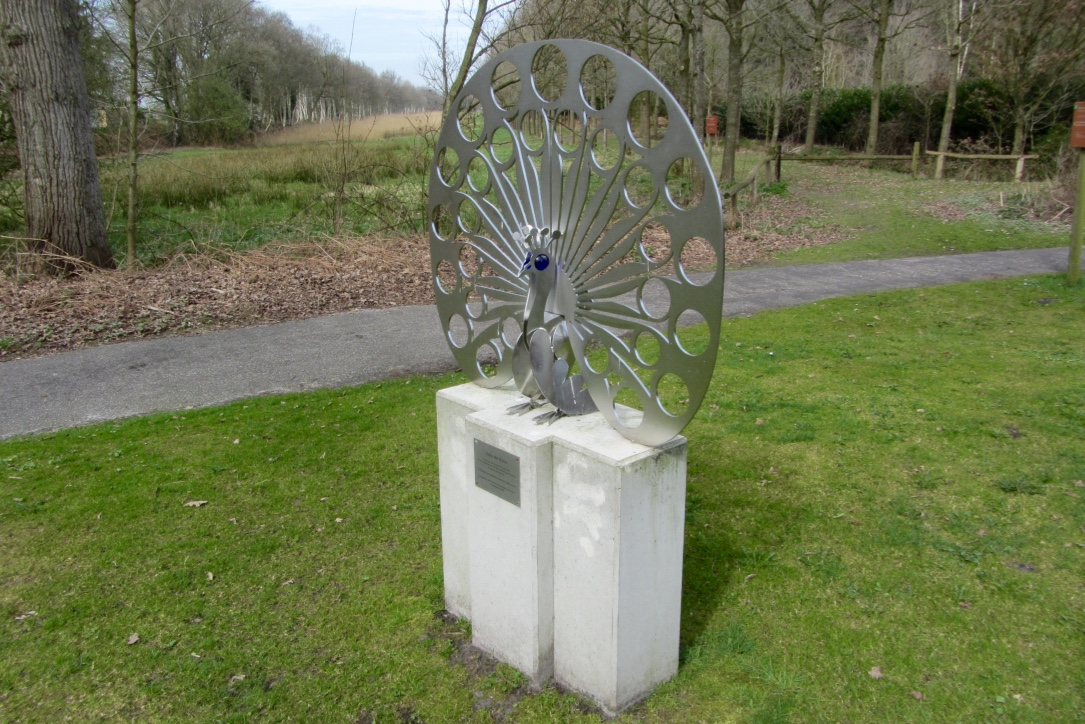
Art sculpture
