= De Tjongermolen, Mildam =

Mill in Friesland

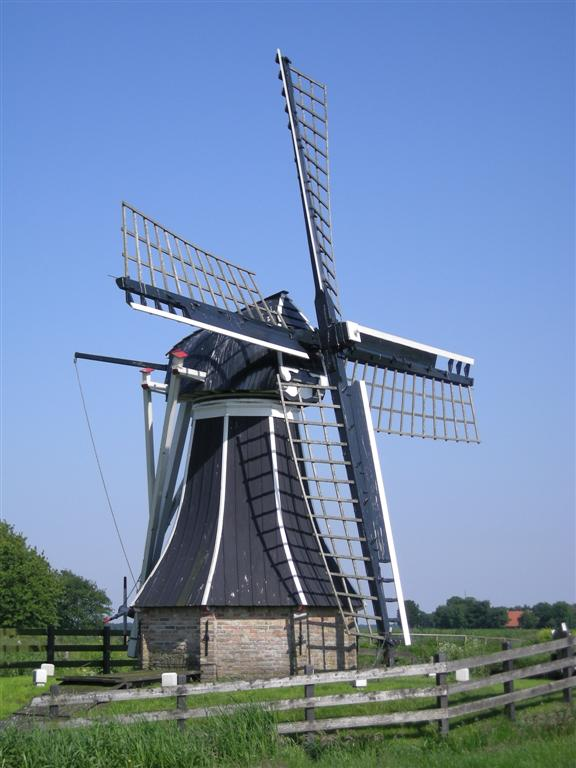
- De Tjongermolen, May 2007.

Origin
- Mill name: De Tjongermolen
- Mill location: Nabij Schoterlandseweg 7, 8454 KA Mildam
- Coordinates: 52°55′55″N 5°59′38″E
- Operator(s): Stichting De Fryske Mole
- Year built: 1983

Information
- Purpose: Drainage mill
- Type: Smock mill
- Storeys: One storey smock
- Base storeys: Single storey base
- Smock sides: Eight sides
- No. of sails: Four sails
- Type of sails: Common sails
- Windshaft: Wood
- Winding: Tailpole and winch
- Type of pump: Archimedes screw

De Tjongermolen is a smock mill in Mildam, Friesland, Netherlands which was built in 1918, replacing a mill that had blown down and rebuilt on a new site in 1983. The mill has been restored to working order. It is listed as a Rijksmonument.

== History ==
A mill was built nearby in 1869. It blew down in 1918 and was rebuilt. The mill worked until 1950, after which it became derelict. The mill was sold to Stichting De Fryske Mole on 4 March 1983, becoming the 33rd mill owned by the society. It was moved to a new site nearby, and restored for of ƒ220,000. The restoration, which resulted in a smaller mill than the original, was completed on 21 October 1983. The mill was restored in the summer of 2012. A new cap and sails were fitted. De Tjongermolen is listed as a Rijksmonument, number 511214.

== Description ==
De Tjongermolen is what the Dutch describe as a Grondzeiler. It is a one storey smock mill on a single storey brick base. There is no stage, the sails reaching almost to ground level. The mill is winded by tailpole and winch. The smock and cap are boarded. The sails are Common sails. They have a span of 9.72 metres (31 ft 11 in). The sails are carried on a wood windshaft. It also carries the brake wheel which has 43 cogs. This drives the wallower (22 cogs) at the top of the upright shaft. At the bottom of the upright shaft there are two crown wheels The upper crown wheel, which has 33 cogs drives an Archimedes' screw via a crown wheel. The lower crown wheel, which has 32 cogs is carried on the axle of an Archimedes' screw, which was used to drain the polder. The axle of the screw is 22 centimetres (9 in) diameter and 3.40 metres (11 ft 2 in) long. The screw is 1.04 metres (3 ft 5 in) diameter. It is inclined at 24.5°. Each revolution of the screw lifts 82 litres (18 imp gal) of water.

== Public access ==
De Tjongermolen is open to the public by appointment.
