= De Knipe =

- Village
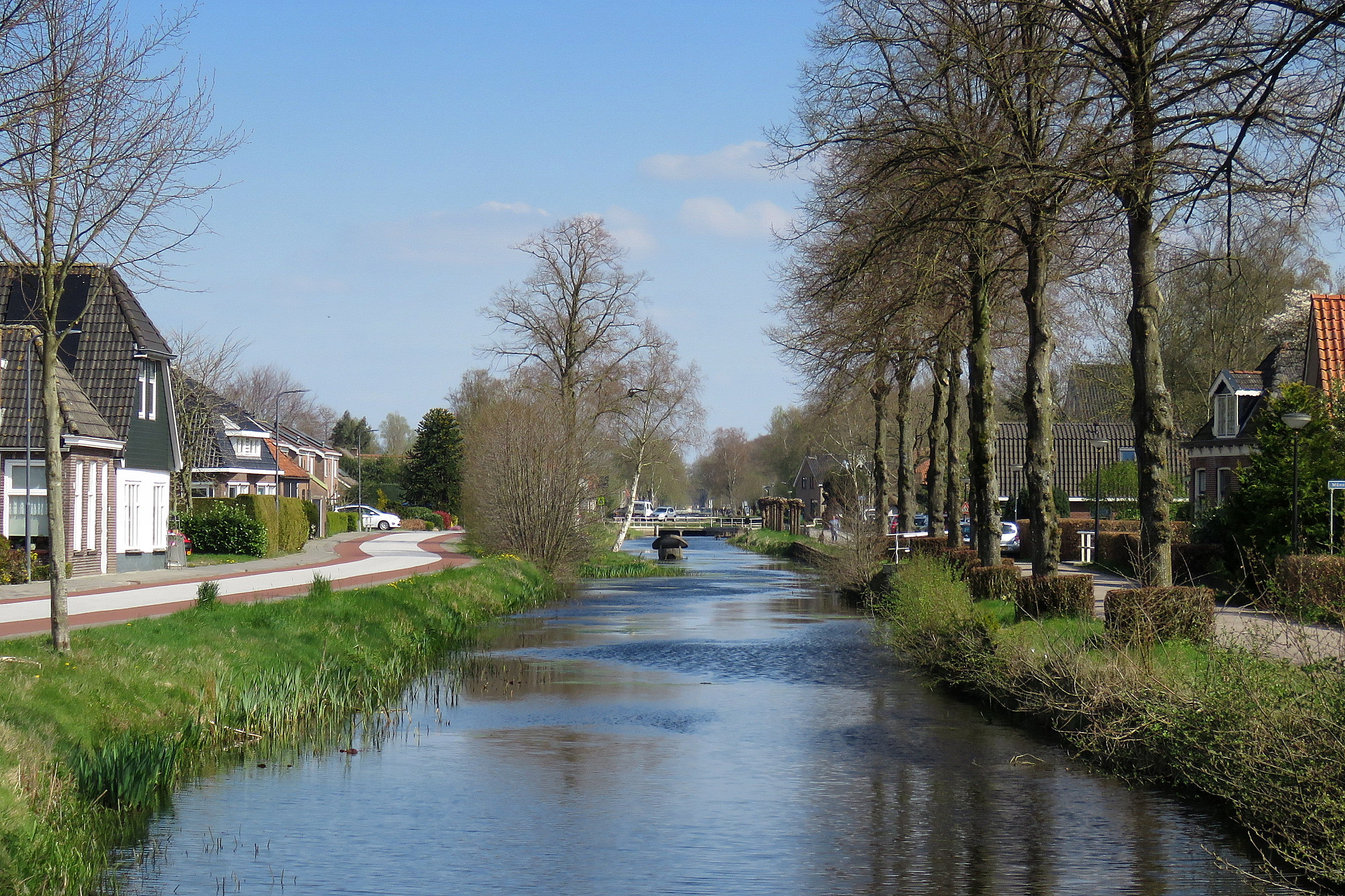
- The Skoatterlânske Kompanjonsfeart in De Knipe

- Flag

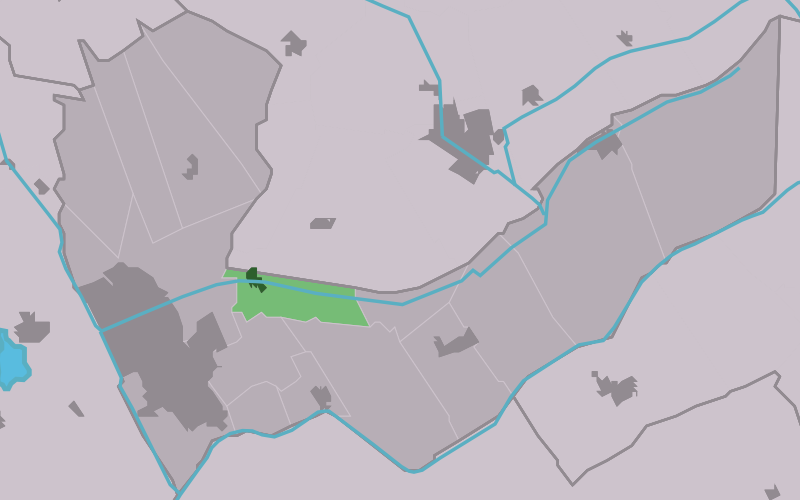
- Location in the Heerenveen municipality

- Location in the Netherlands De Knipe (Netherlands)
- Country: Netherlands
- Province: Friesland
- Municipality: Heerenveen

Area
  - Total: 5.03 km^{2} (1.94 sq mi)
- Elevation: 0.6 m (2.0 ft)

Population (2021)
  - Total: 1,415
  - Density: 281/km^{2} (729/sq mi)
- Time zone: UTC+1 (CET)
  - Summer (DST): UTC+2 (CEST)
- Postal code: 8456
- Dialing code: 0513

De Knipe (archaic: Dutch: De Knijpe) is a village in the municipality (Dutch: Gemeente) Heerenveen in the province of Friesland, the Netherlands. It had a population of around 1,455 in January 2017.

== History ==
The village was first mentioned in 1622 as Nieubrongerga1. De Knipe means artificial narrowing of a stream, and refers to the sluice in the Schoterlandse Compagnonsvaart. There used to be two settlements: Boven-Knijpe which was also known as Nieuw Katlijk and Beneden Knijpe also Nieuw Brongerga. In 1970, both settlements were joint as De Knipe. The Protestant Church dates from 1661 and is plastered white, and therefore informally called White Church. The Mennonite church dates from 1751. In 1840, Boven-Knijpe was home to 571 people and Beneden-Knijpe had a population of 643 people.

== Gallery ==
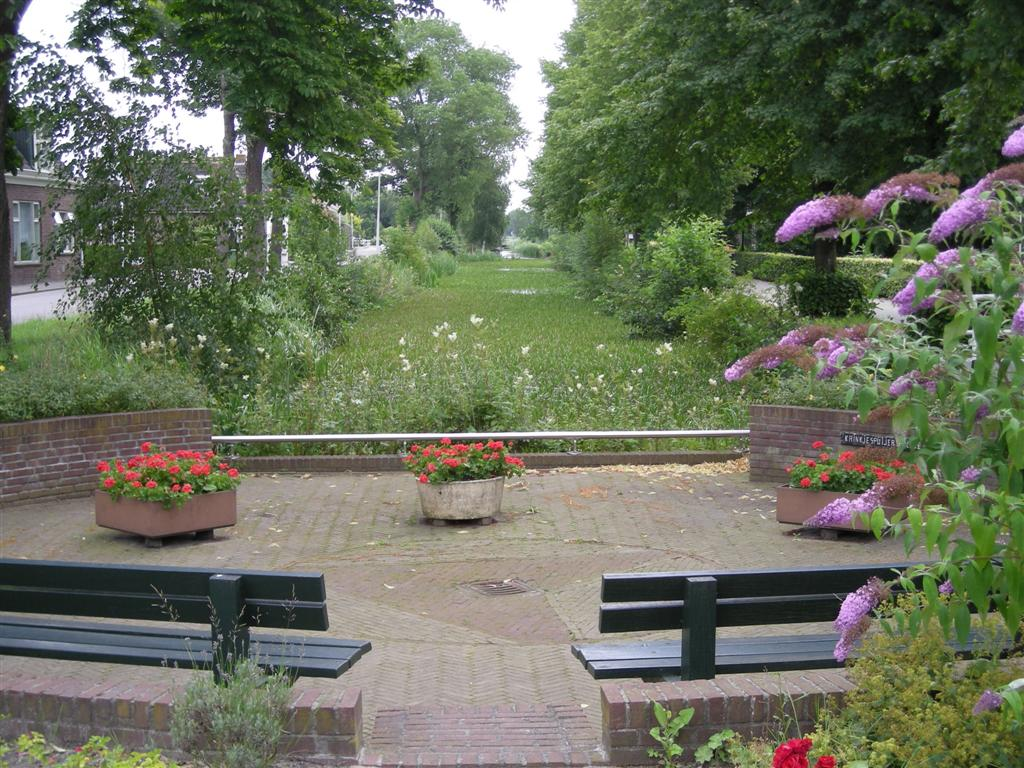
Canal view

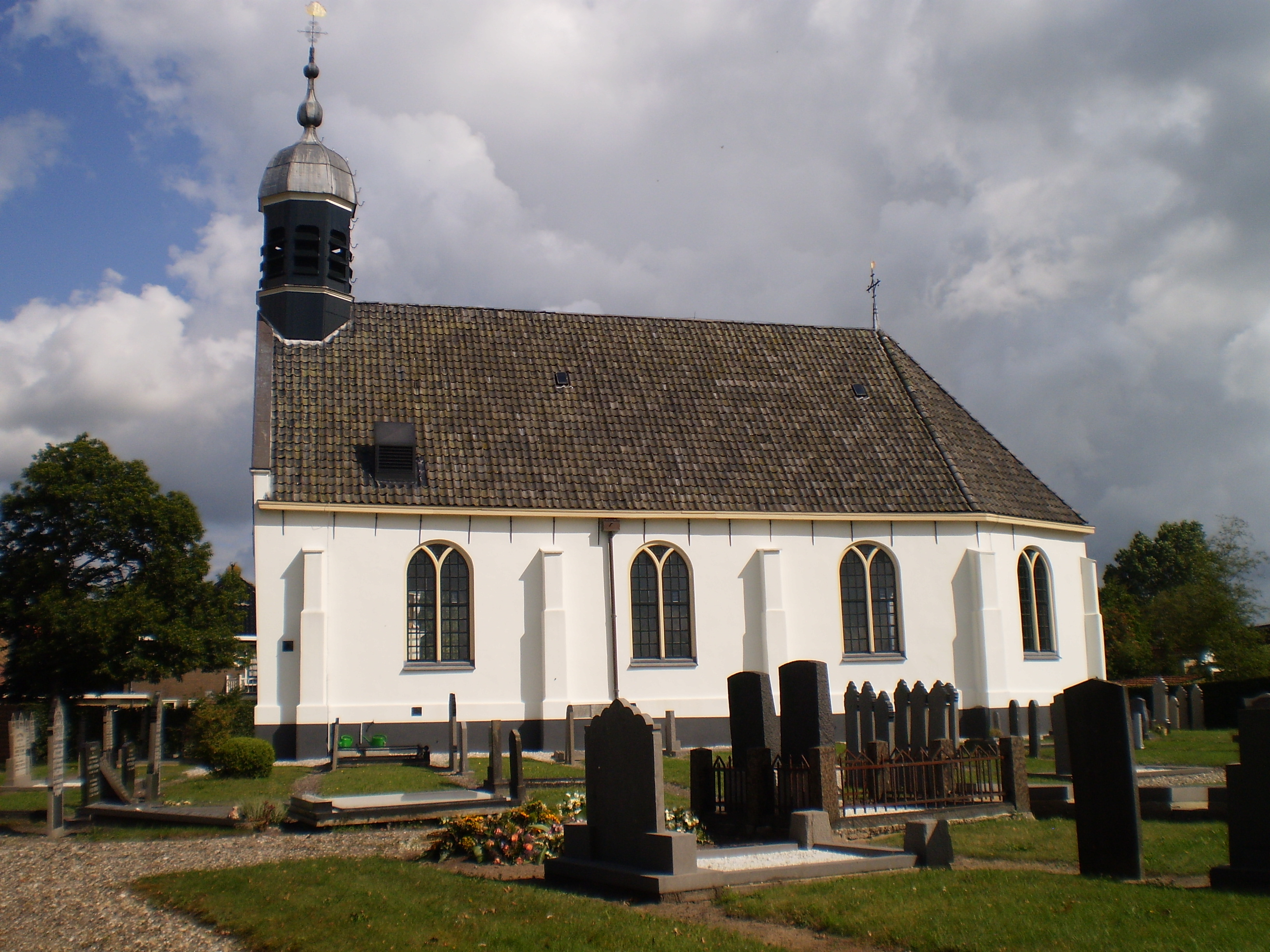
Protestant church

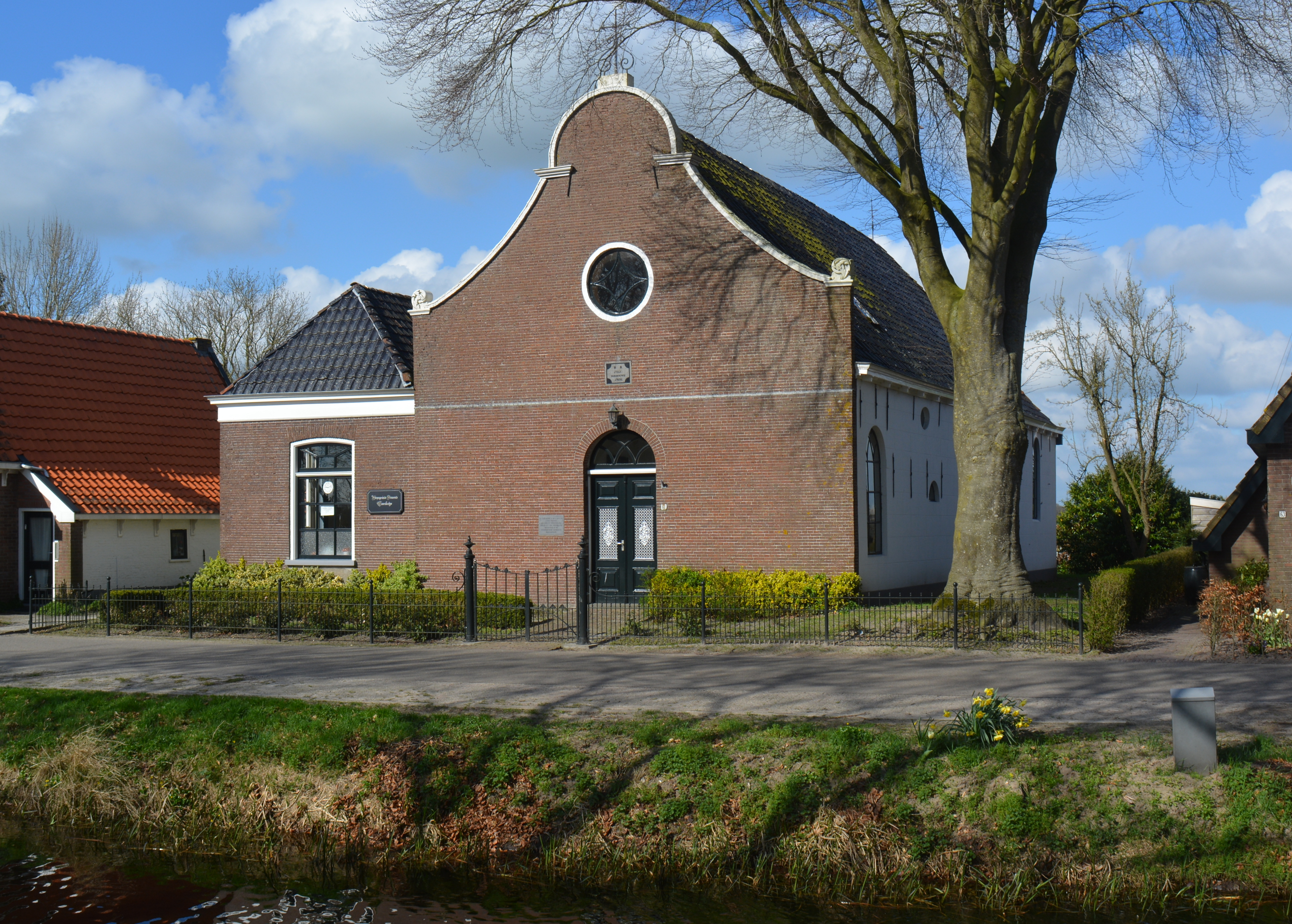
Mennonite church

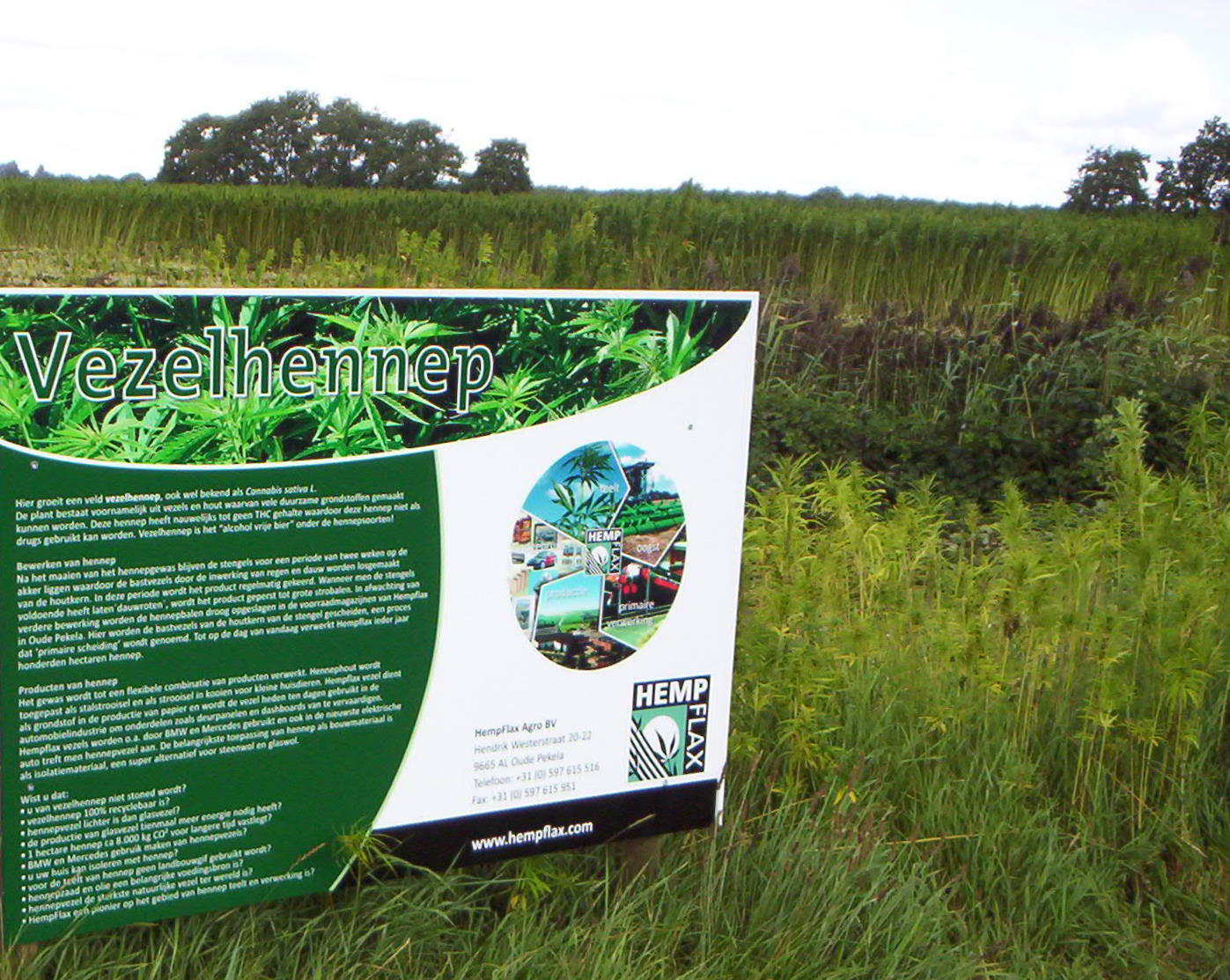
Hemp harvest
