= Mildam =

Mildam Mildaam
- Village
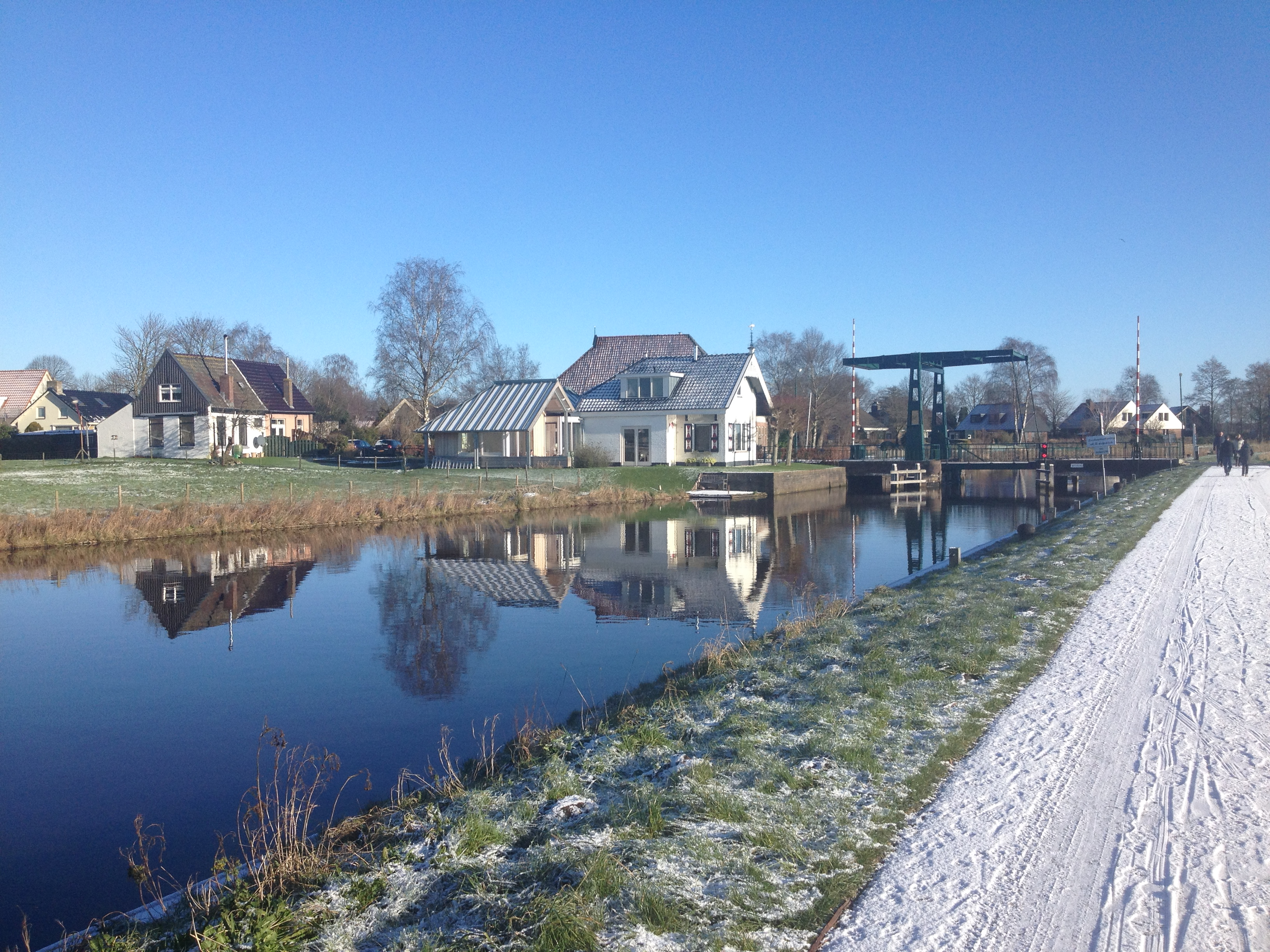
- Mildam, bridge Tjonger

- Flag Coat of arms

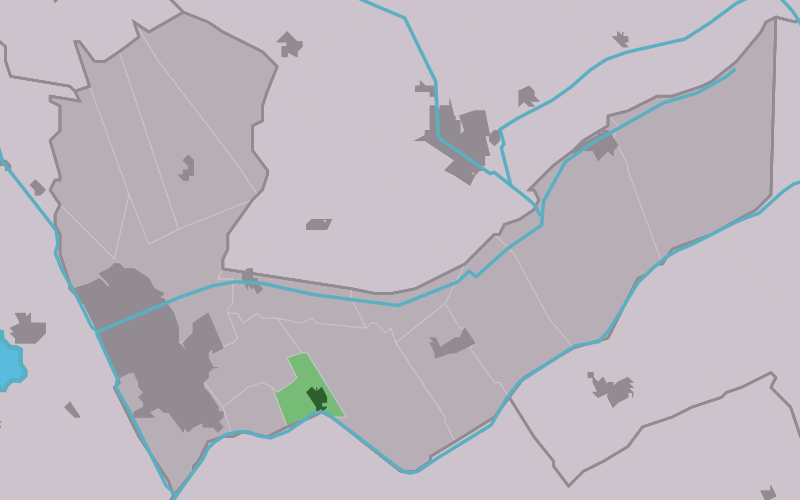
- Location in the Heerenveen municipality

- Location in the Netherlands Mildam (Netherlands)
- Country: Netherlands
- Province: Friesland
- Municipality: Heerenveen

Area
  - Total: 2.32 km^{2} (0.90 sq mi)
- Elevation: 1 m (3.3 ft)

Population (2021)
  - Total: 675
  - Density: 291/km^{2} (754/sq mi)
- Time zone: UTC+1 (CET)
  - Summer (DST): UTC+2 (CEST)
- Postal code: 8454
- Dialing code: 0513

Mildam (West Frisian: Mildaam) is a village in Heerenveen in the province of Friesland, the Netherlands. It had a population of around 685 in January 2017.

Louis Le Roy's "eco-cathedral" is located here. There is a windmill in the village, De Tjongermolen.

== History ==
The village was first mentioned in 1523 as tho Meyledam, and either means middle dam or dam of Meila (person). Mildam developed in the 18th century near a place where the Tjonger river could be crossed. Nowadays, it is more of a suburb of Heerenveen. The current Dutch Reformed church was rebuilt in 1726. In 1840, Mildam was home to 297 people.

The Tjongermolen is a polder mill built in 1983 to replace a ruinous mill from 1869.

Before 1934, Mildam was part of the Schoterland municipality.

== Gallery ==
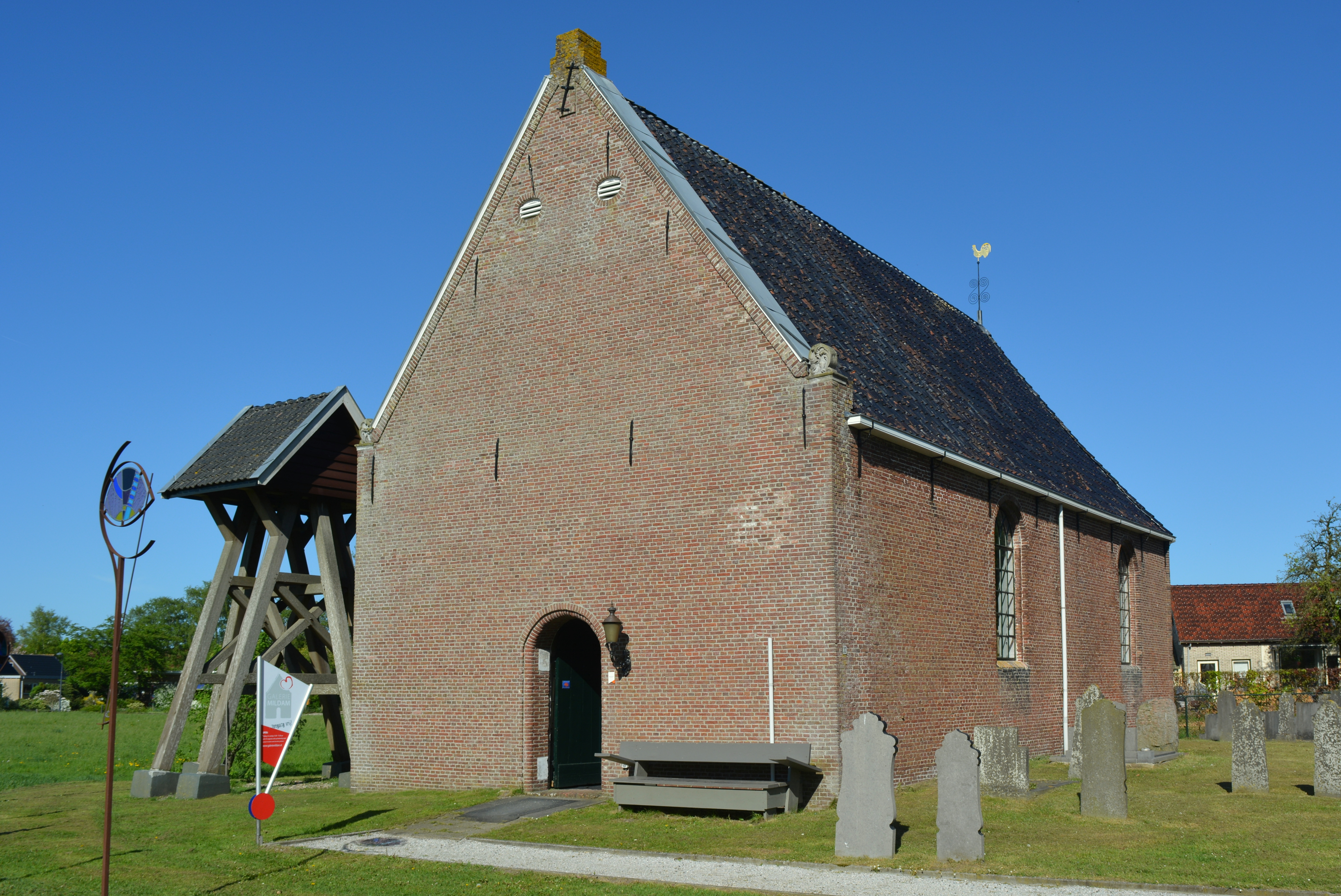
Church and bell tower

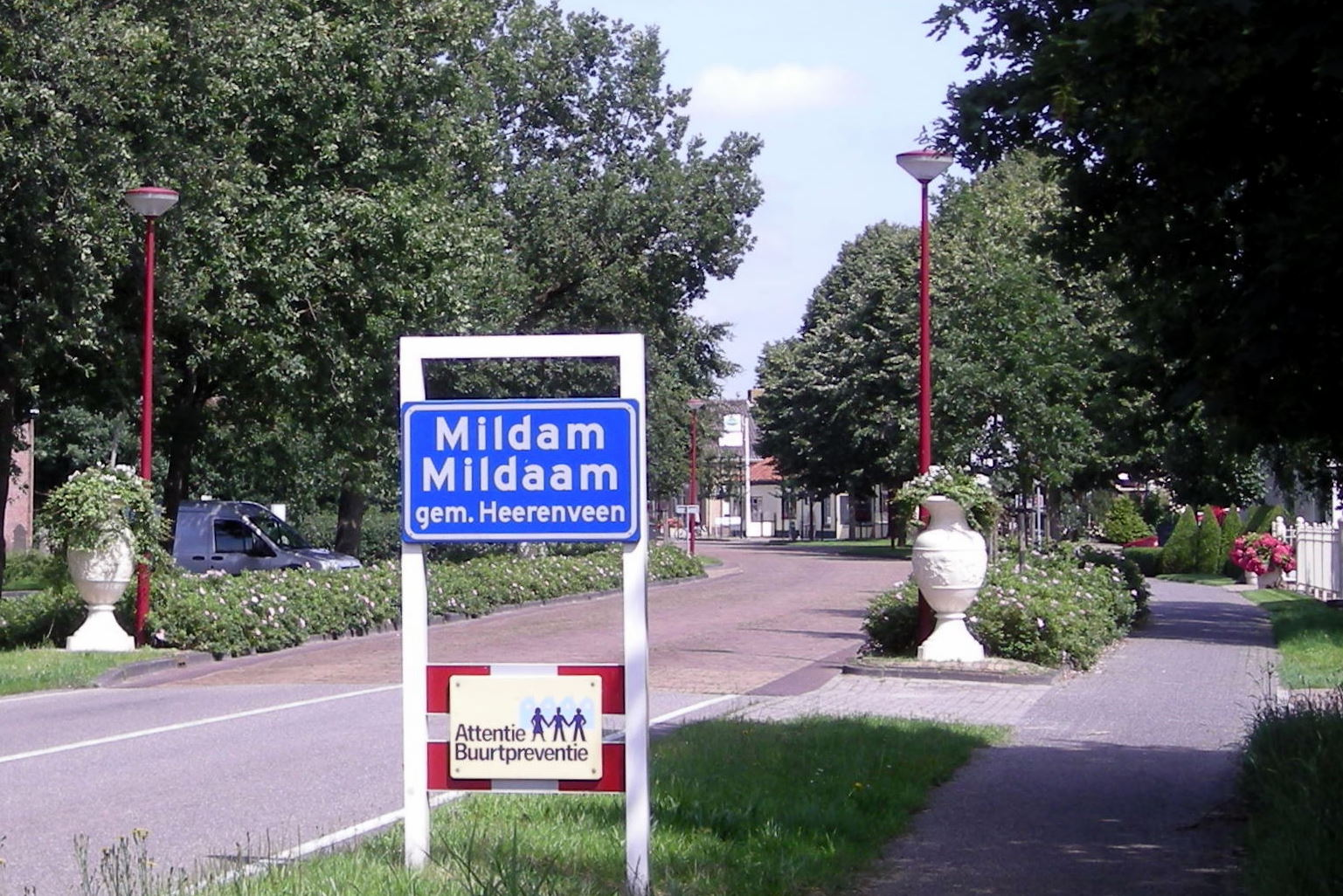
Welcome to Mildam

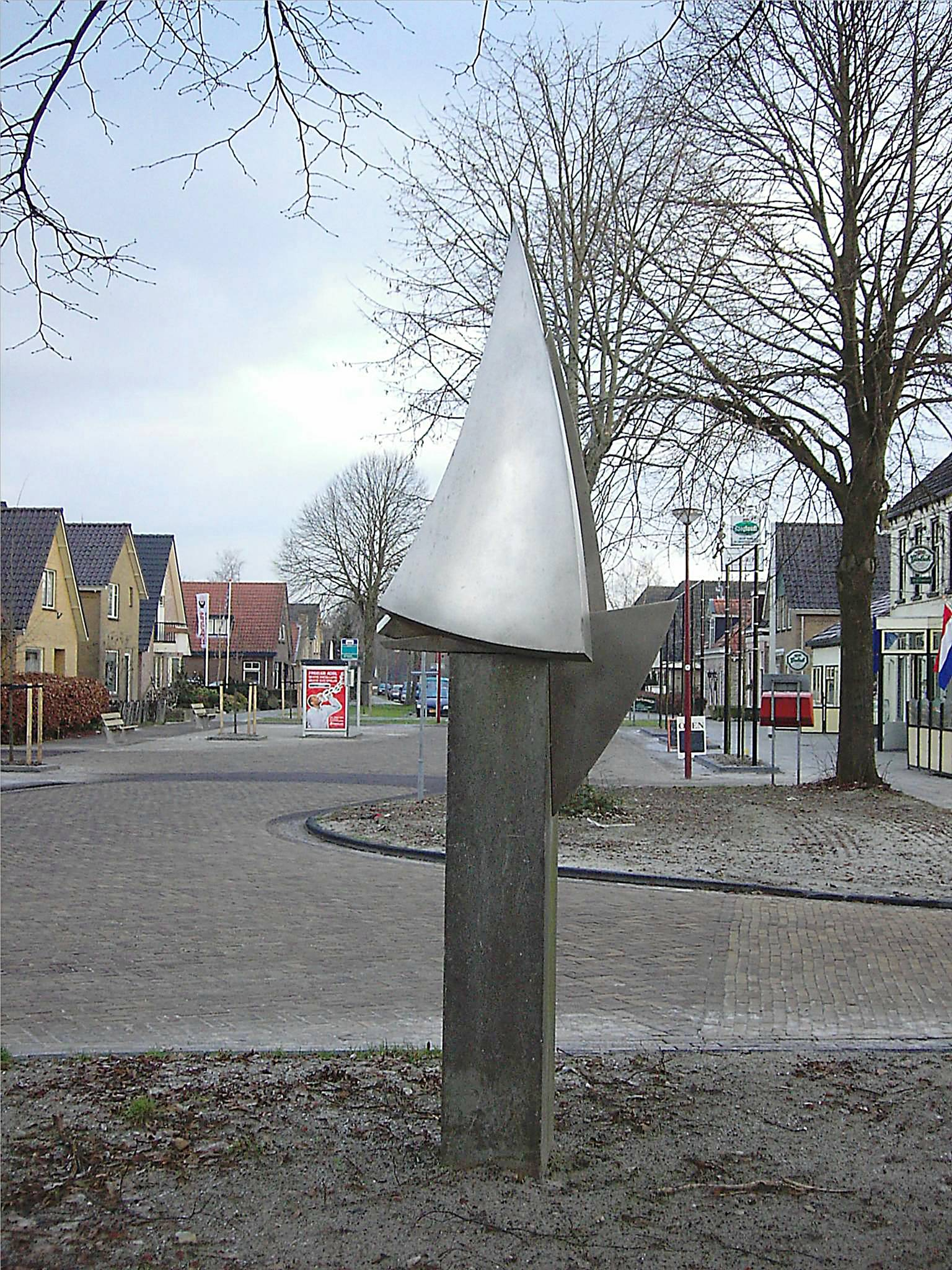
Sailing boat statue

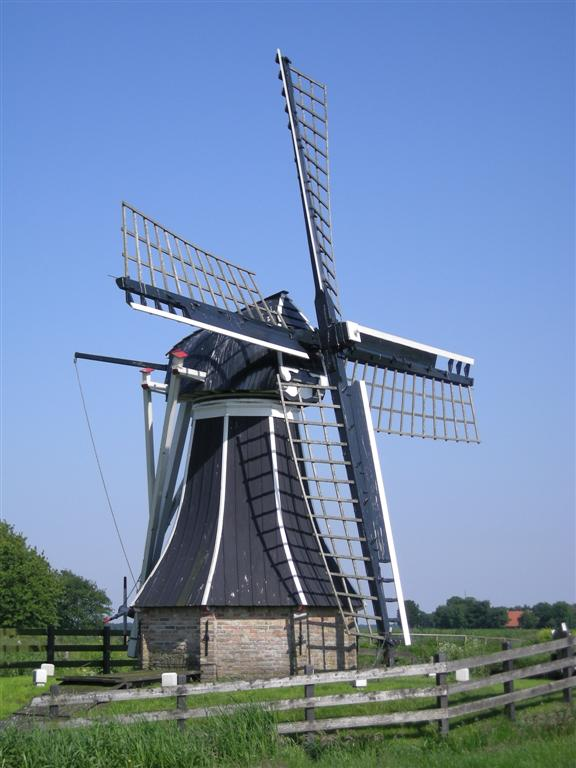
Windmill De Tjongermolen
