= Nijelamer =

- Village
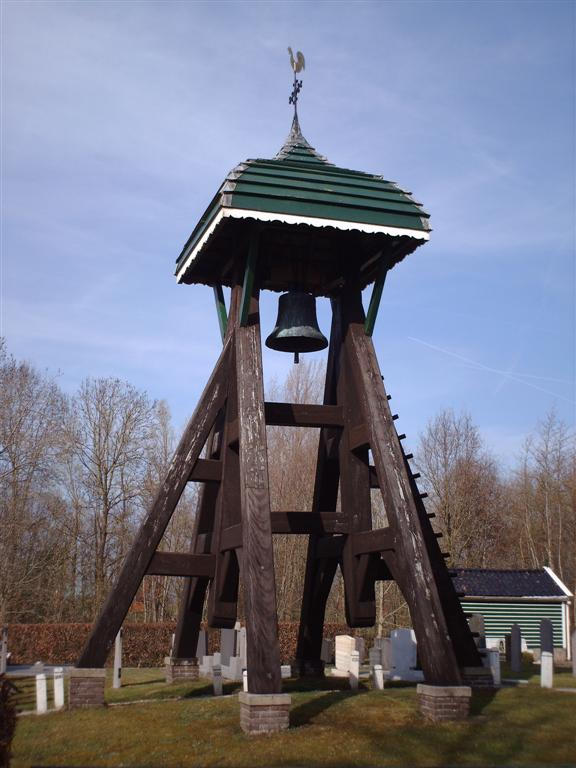
- Nijelamer Clock Tower

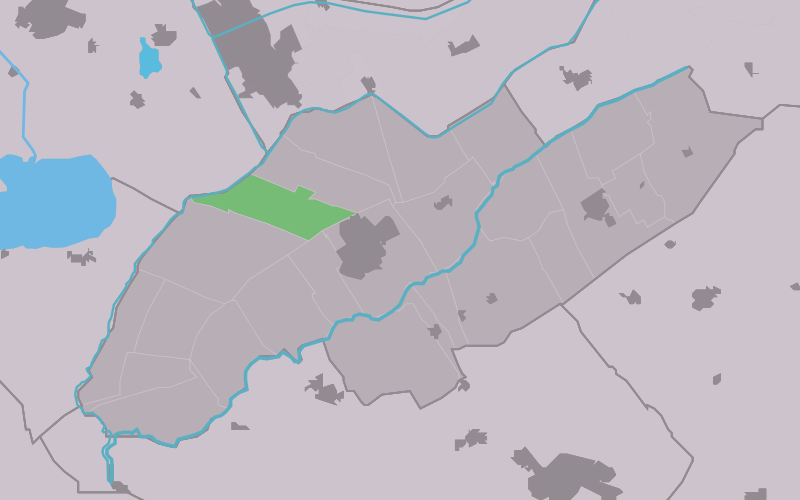
- Location in Weststellingwerf municipality

- Location in the Netherlands Nijelamer (Netherlands)
- Country: Netherlands
- Province: Friesland
- Municipality: Weststellingwerf

Area
  - Total: 8.49 km^{2} (3.28 sq mi)
- Elevation: −0.4 m (−1.3 ft)

Population (2021)
  - Total: 140
  - Density: 16/km^{2} (43/sq mi)
- Time zone: UTC+1 (CET)
  - Summer (DST): UTC+2 (CEST)
- Postal code: 8487
- Dialing code: 0561

Nijelamer (West Frisian: Nijlemmer) is a village in Weststellingwerf in the province of Friesland, the Netherlands. It had a population of around 153 in 2017.

The village was first mentioned in 1320 as Nienlameren. The etymology is unclear. It uses Nije (new) to distinguish from Oldelamer. Nijelamer has no church, but only a bell tower. The tower was restored in 1795.

Nijelamer was home to 257 people in 1840.

== Gallery ==
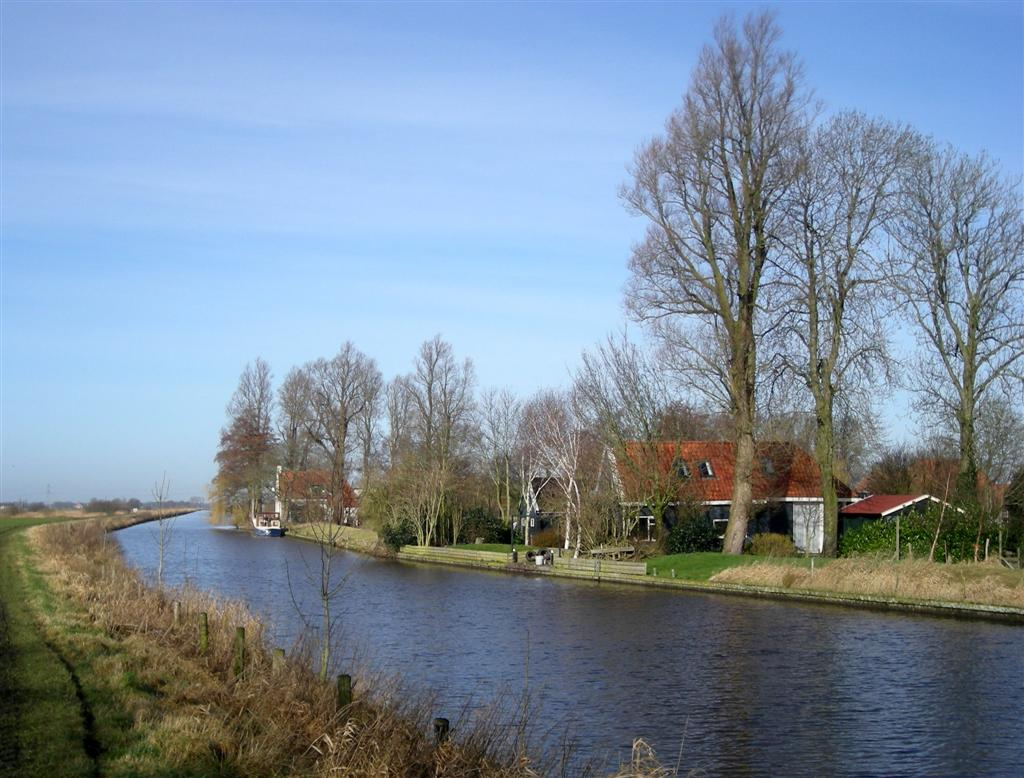
Canal view in Nijelamer

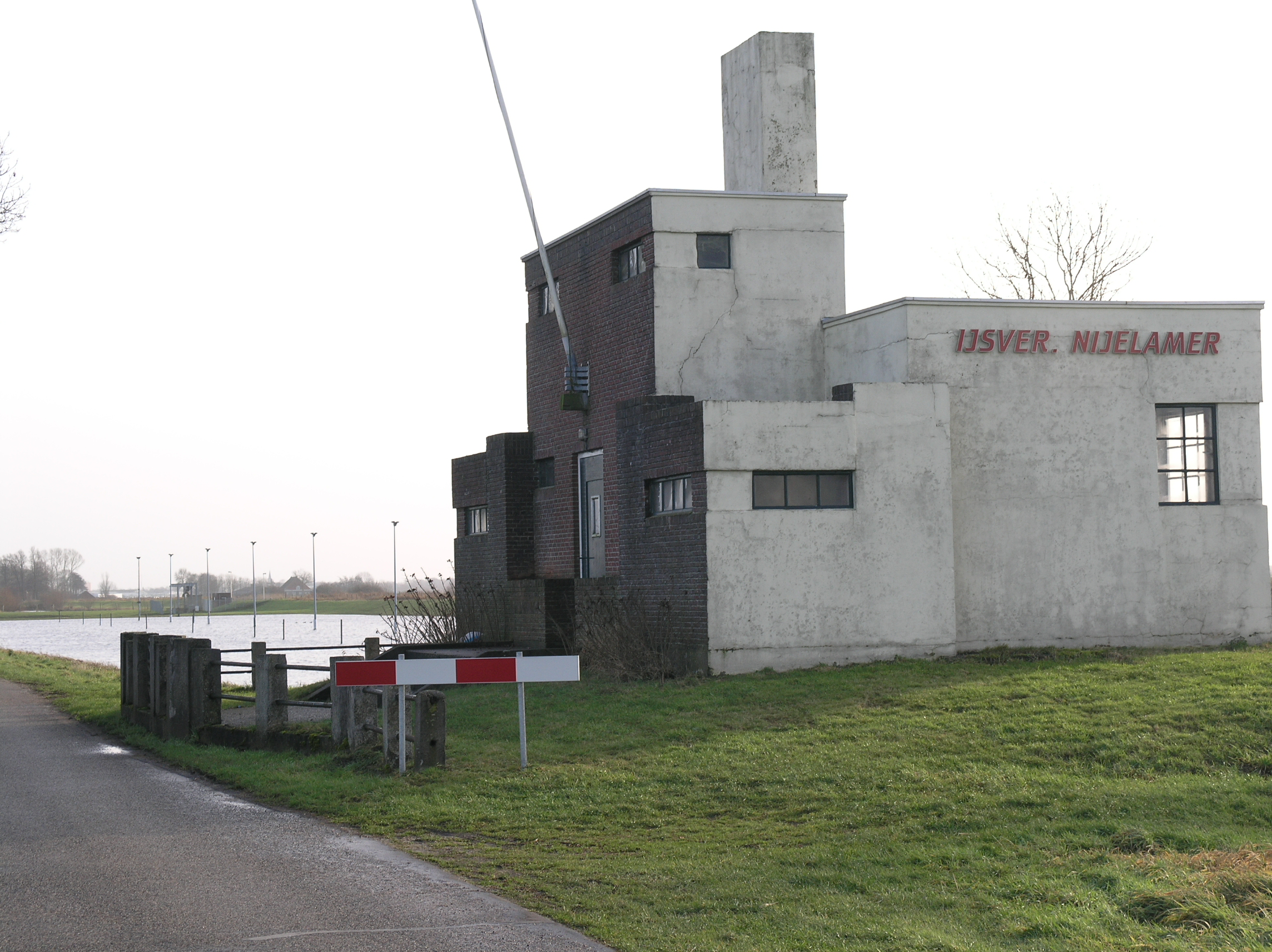
Former pumping used by the ice skating club
