= Oldelamer =

- Village
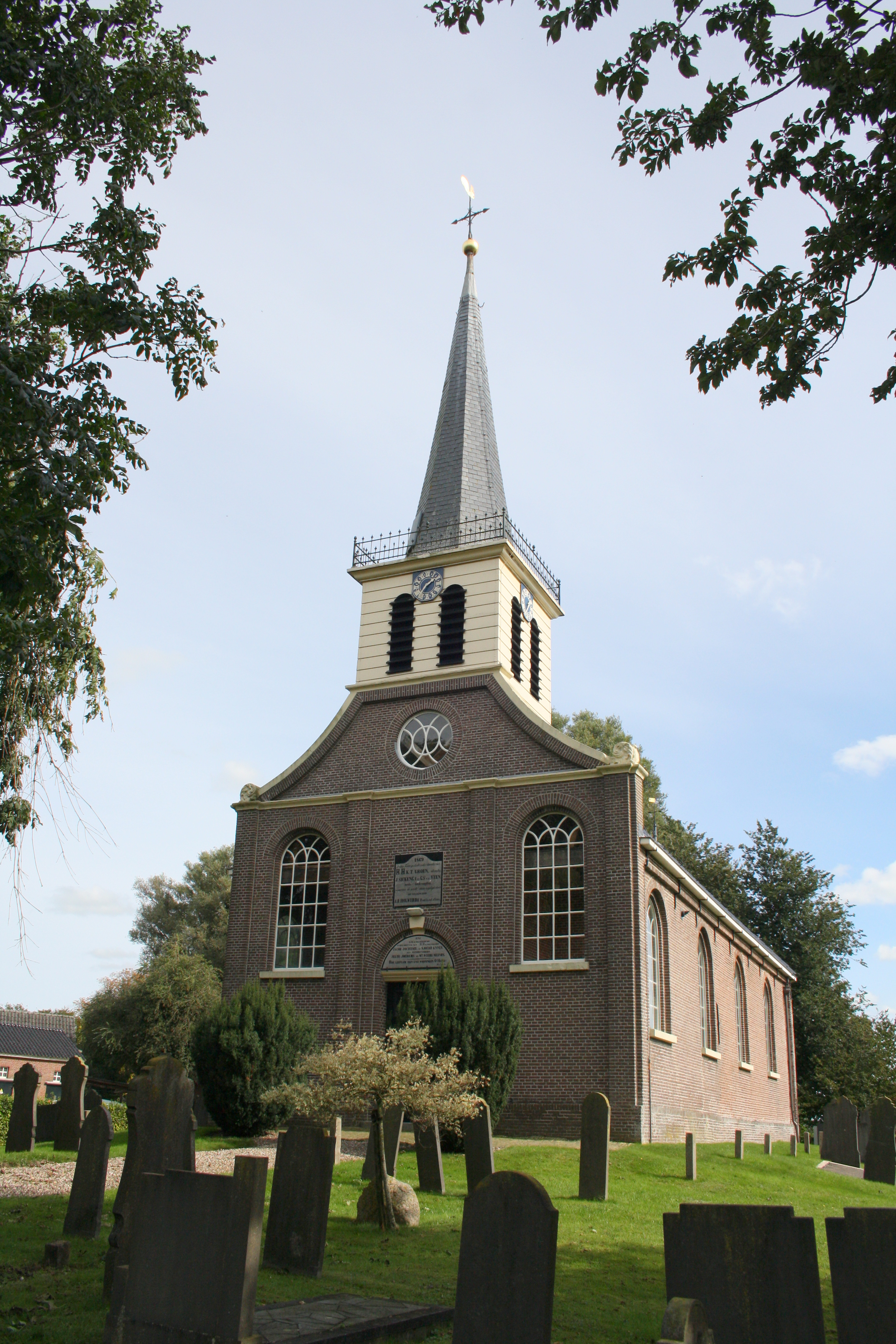
- Oldelamer Church

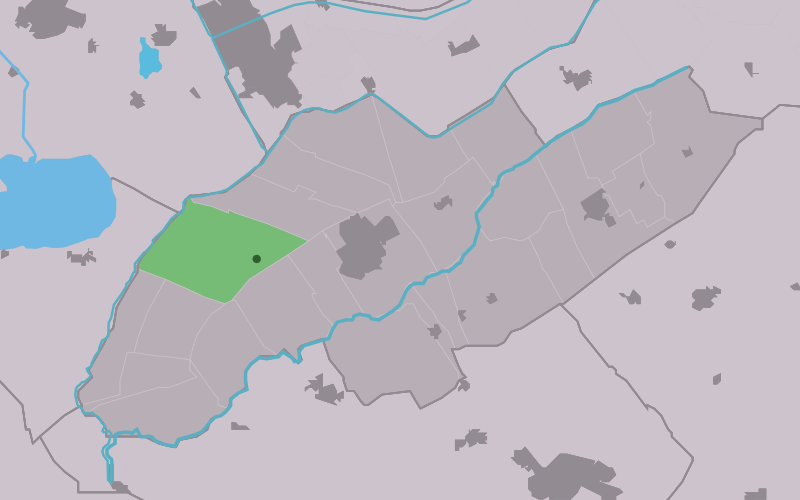
- Location in Weststellingwerf municipality

- Location in the Netherlands Oldelamer (Netherlands)
- Country: Netherlands
- Province: Friesland
- Municipality: Weststellingwerf

Area
  - Total: 17.20 km^{2} (6.64 sq mi)
- Elevation: −0.3 m (−0.98 ft)

Population (2021)
  - Total: 235
  - Density: 13.7/km^{2} (35.4/sq mi)
- Time zone: UTC+1 (CET)
  - Summer (DST): UTC+2 (CEST)
- Postal code: 8486
- Dialing code: 0561

Oldelamer (West Frisian: Aldlemmer) is a village in Weststellingwerf in the province of Friesland, the Netherlands. It had a population of around 230 in 2017.

The village was first mentioned in 1320 as Oldenlameren. The etymology is unclear. Olde (old) has been added to distinguish from Nijelamer. The Dutch Reformed church dates from 1784. The little tower was added in 1869. On 14 September 2017, the spire broke in a storm, but was quickly repaired.

Oldelamer was home to 315 people in 1840.
